= Governor General's Award for French to English translation =

Canadian literary award

This is a list of recipients of the Governor General's Award for French-to-English translation.

== Winners and nominees ==
=== 1980s ===
Year	Author	Title	Translated work
1987	Patricia Claxton	Enchantment and Sorrow: The Autobiography of Gabrielle Roy	Gabrielle Roy, La Détresse et l'enchantement
1987	Sheila Fischman	Heartbreaks Along the Road	Roch Carrier, De l'amour dans la ferraille
1987	Anthony Martin-Sperry	Languages and Their Territories	J. A. Laponce, Langue et territoire
1987	Patricia Sillers	The Dragon and Other Laurentian Tales	Claude Jasmin, Les contes du Sommet-Bleu
1988	Philip Stratford	Second Chance	Diane Hébert, Un Second souffle
1988	Arnold Bennett	The History of the Labour Movement in Quebec	Michel Doré, Louise Fournier, [title unknown]
1988	Jane Brierley	A Man of Sentiment: The Memoirs of Philippe-Joseph Aubert de Gaspé	Philippe-Joseph Aubert de Gaspé, Mémoires
1988	David Homel	How to Make Love to a Negro	Dany Laferrière, Comment faire l'amour avec un nègre sans se fatiguer
1989	Wayne Grady	On the Eighth Day	Antonine Maillet, Le Huitième jour
1989	Arlette Francière	Kaleidoscope	Michel Beaulieu, Kaléidoscope, ou les aléas du corps grave
1989	Donald Winkler	Rose and Thorn	Roland Giguère, selected poetry

=== 1990s ===
Year	Author	Title	Translated work
1990	Jane Brierley	Yellow-Wolf and Other Tales of the Saint Lawrence	Philippe-Joseph Aubert de Gaspé, Divers
1990	Patricia Claxton	Letters to Bernadette	Gabrielle Roy, Ma chère petite sœur : Lettres à Bernadette 1943–1970
1990	Sheila Fischman	Benito	François Gravel, Benito
1990	Anthony Martin-Sperry	Charlevoix: Two Centuries at Murray Bay	Philippe Dubé, Deux cents ans villégiature dans Charlevoix
1990	Susan Usher	Community Care and Participatory Research	Jacques Alary, Solidarités: Pratiques de recherche-action et de prise en charge par le milieu
1991	Albert W. Halsall	A Dictionary of Literary Devices: Gradus, A-Z	Bernard Dupriez, Gradus : Les procédés littéraires
1991	Linda Gaboriau	Lilies, or the Revival of a Romantic Drama	Michel Marc Bouchard, Les feluettes
1991	Peter Keating	Physics and the Rise of Scientific Research in Canada	Yves Gingras, Les origines de la recherche scientifique au Canada : le cas des physiciens
1991	Patricia Smart, Dorothy Howard	The Diary of André Laurendeau	André Laurendeau, Journal tenu pendant la Commission royale d’enquête sur le bilinguisme et le biculturalisme
1992	Fred A. Reed	Imagining the Middle East	Thierry Hentsch, L'Orient imaginaire
1992	Neil B. Bishop	Death of the Spider	Michèle Mailhot, La mort de l'araignée
1992	Sheila Fischman	Felicity's Fool	François Gravel, Bonheur fou
1992	Luise von Flotow	Deathly Delights	Anne Dandurand, L'Assassin de l'intérieur / Diables d'espoir
1992	Agnes Whitfield	Divine Diva	Daniel Gagnon, Venite a cantare
1993	D. G. Jones	Categorics One, Two and Three	Normand de Bellefeuille, Catégoriques un deux et trois
1993	Jane Brierley	The Maerlande Chronicles	Elisabeth Vonarburg, Les chroniques du pays des Mères
1993	Sheila Fischman	Following the Summer	Lise Bissonnette, Marie suivait l'été
1993	Linda Gaboriau	The Eye Is an Eagle	Pierre Morency, L'Œil américain
1993	Käthe Roth	The Last Cod Fish	Pol Chantraine, La Dernière queue de morue
1994	Donald Winkler	The Lyric Generation: The Life and Times of the Baby Boomers	François Ricard, La Génération lyrique
1994	Patricia Claxton	Tchipayuk or The Way of the Wolf	Ronald Lavallée, Tchipayuk
1994	Sheila Fischman	The Sound of Living Things	Élise Turcotte, Le bruit des choses vivantes
1994	David Homel	An Aroma of Coffee	Dany Laferrière, L'odeur du café
1994	Shelley Tepperman	Playing Bare	Dominic Champagne, La Répétition
1995	David Homel	Why Must a Black Writer Write About Sex?	Dany Laferrière, Cette grenade dans la main du jeune nègre est-elle une arme ou un fruit?
1995	Paul Leduc Browne, Dream Michelle Weinroth	Trudeau and the End of a Canadian Dream	Guy Laforest, Trudeau et la fin du rêve canadien
1995	Sheila Fischman	No Song, But Silence	Hélène Le Beau, La Chute du corps
1995	Wayne Grady	Black Squirrel	Daniel Poliquin, L'écureuil noir
1995	Susan Ouriou	The Road to Chlifa	Michèle Marineau, La Route de Chlifa
1996	Linda Gaboriau	Stone and Ashes	Daniel Danis, Cendres de cailloux
1996	Sheila Fischman	Ostend	François Gravel, Ostende
1996	D. G. Jones	For Orchestra and Solo Poet	Émile Martel, Pour orchestre et poète seul
1996	Shelley Tepperman	In Vitro	Yvan Bienvenue, In vitro
1997	Howard Scott	The Euguelion	Louky Bersianik, L'Euguélionne
1997	Jane Brierley	Canadians of Old	Philippe-Joseph Aubert de Gaspé, Les Anciens canadiens
1997	Patricia Claxton	Baroque at Dawn	Nicole Brossard, Baroque d'aube
1997	David Homel	A Drifting Year	Dany Laferrière, Chronique de la dérive douce
1997	Nancy Huston	The Goldberg Variations	Nancy Huston, Les variations Goldberg
1998	Sheila Fischman	Bambi and Me	Michel Tremblay, Les vues animés
1998	Arnold Bennett	Voltaire's Man in America	Jean-Paul de Lagrave, L'Époque de Voltaire au Canada
1998	David Homel	The Second Fiddle	Yves Beauchemin, Le Second violon
1998	Daniel Sloate	Aknos and Other Poems	Fulvio Caccia, selected poetry
1999	Patricia Claxton	Gabrielle Roy: A Life	François Ricard, Gabrielle roy, une vie
1999	David Homel	Olivo Oliva	Philippe Poloni, Olivo, Oliva
1999	Nancy Huston	The Mark of the Angel	Nancy Huston, L'Empreinte de l'ange
1999	Lazer Lederhendler	The Sparrow Has Cut the Day in Half	Claire Dé, Bonheur, Oiseau rare
1999	Donald Winkler	The World of the Gift	Jacques Godbout, Alain Caillé, L'Esprit du don

=== 2000s ===
Year	Author	Title	Translated work
2000	Robert Majzels	Just Fine	France Daigle, Pas pire
2000	Sheila Fischman	Terra Firma	Christiane Frenette, La Terre ferme
2000	Linda Gaboriau	Down Dangerous Passes Road	Michel Marc Bouchard, Le chemin des Passes-dangereuses
2000	Bobby Theodore	15 Seconds	François Archambault, 15 secondes
2001	Fred A. Reed, David Homel	Fairy Ring	Martine Desjardins, Le Cercle de Clara
2001	Sheila Fischman	The Little Girl Who Was Too Fond of Matches	Gaétan Soucy, La petite fille qui aimait trop les allumettes
2001	Gail Scott	The Sailor's Disquiet	Michael Delisle, Le Désarroi du matelot
2002	Nigel Spencer	Thunder and Light	Marie-Claire Blais, Dans la foudre et la lumière
2002	Sheila Fischman	Twelve Opening Acts	Michel Tremblay, Douze coups de théâtre
2002	Linda Gaboriau	Impromptu on Nun's Island	Michel Tremblay, L'État des lieux
2002	Liedewy Hawke	The Milky Way	Louise Dupré, La Voie lactée
2002	Lazer Lederhendler	Larry Volt	Pierre Tourangeau, Larry Volt
2003	Jane Brierley	Memoirs of a Less Travelled Road: A Historian’s Life	Marcel Trudel, Mémoire d'un autre siècle
2003	Patricia Claxton	A Sunday at the Pool in Kigali	Gil Courtemanche, Un dimanche à la piscine à Kigali
2003	Jo-Anne Elder	Tales from Dog Island: St. Pierre et Miquelon	Françoise Enguehard, L’Île aux Chiens
2003	David Homel, Fred A. Reed	The Heart Is an Involuntary Muscle	Monique Proulx, Le Cœur est un muscle involontaire
2003	Susan Ouriou	Necessary Betrayals	Guillaume Vigneault, Chercher le vent
2004	Judith Cowan	Mirabel	Pierre Nepveu, Lignes aériennes
2004	Sheila Fischman	The Alien House	Élise Turcotte, La maison étrangère
2004	Liedewy Hawke	The Iguana	Denis Thériault, L'Iguane
2005	Fred A. Reed	Truth or Death: The Quest for Immortality in the Western Narrative Tradition	Thierry Hentsch, Raconter et mourir : aux sources narratives de l’imaginaire occidental
2005	Jane Brierley	America: The Lewis and Clark Expedition and the Dawn of a New Power	Denis Vaugeois, America, 1803–1853 : l’expédition de Lewis & Clark et la naissance d’une nouvelle puissance
2005	Susanne de Lotbinière-Harwood	Yesterday, at the Hotel Clarendon	Nicole Brossard, Hier
2005	Wayne Grady	Return from Africa	Francine D'Amour, Le Retour d’Afrique
2005	Fred A. Reed, David Homel	All that Glitters	Martine Desjardins, L'Élu du hasard
2006	Hugh Hazelton	Vetiver	Joël Des Rosiers, Vétiver
2006	Sheila Fischman	The Bicycle Eater	Larry Tremblay, Le Mangeur de bicyclette
2006	Linda Gaboriau	Assorted Candies	Michel Tremblay, Bonbons assortis
2006	Lazer Lederhendler	The Immaculate Conception	Gaetan Soucy, L’Immaculée Conception
2006	Fred A. Reed	A Threat from Within: A Century of Jewish Opposition to Zionism	Yakov M. Rabkin, Au nom de la Torah : une histoire de l’opposition juive au sionisme
2007	Nigel Spencer	Augustino and the Choir of Destruction	Marie-Claire Blais, Augustino et le chœur de la déstruction
2007	Sheila Fischman	My Sister's Blue Eyes	Jacques Poulin, Les Yeux bleus de Mistassini
2007	Robert Majzels, Erín Moure	Notebook of Roses and Civilization	Nicole Brossard, Cahier de roses et de civilisation
2007	Rhonda Mullins	The Decline of the Hollywood Empire	Hervé Fischer, Le déclin de l’empire hollywoodien
2007	John Murrell	Two Plays: John and Beatrice; Helen's Necklace	Carole Fréchette, Jean et Béatrice and Le collier d’Hélène
2008	Lazer Lederhendler	Nikolski	Nicolas Dickner, Nikolski
2008	Paul Leduc Browne, Michelle Weinroth	The Making of the Nations and Cultures of the New World	Gérard Bouchard, Genèse des nations et cultures du Nouveau Monde
2008	Jo-Anne Elder	Beatitudes	Herménégilde Chiasson, Béatitudes
2008	Liedewy Hawke	The Postman's Round	Denis Thériault, Le facteur émotif
2008	Fred A. Reed	Orfeo	Hans-Jürgen Greif, Orfeo
2009	Susan Ouriou	Pieces of Me	Charlotte Gingras, La liberté? Connais pasa
2009	Phyllis Aronoff, Howard Scott	A Slight Case of Fatigue	Stéphane Bourguignon, Un peu de fatigue
2009	Jo-Anne Elder	One	Serge Patrice Thibodeau, Seul on est
2009	David Homel, Fred A. Reed	Wildlives	Monique Proulx, Champagne
2009	Fred A. Reed	Empire of Desire: The Abolition of Time	Thierry Hentsch, Le temps aboli: l'Occident et ses grands recits

=== 2010s ===
Year	Author	Title	Translated work
2010	Linda Gaboriau	Forests	Wajdi Mouawad, Forêts
2010	Sheila Fischman	The Blue Notebook	Michel Tremblay, Le Cahier bleu
2010	Sheila Fischman	On the Proper Use of Stars	Dominique Fortier, Du bon usage des étoiles
2010	Liedewy Hawke	High-Wire Summer	Louise Dupré, L'été funambule
2010	Lazer Lederhendler	The Breakwater House	Pascale Quiviger, La maison des temps rompus
2011	Donald Winkler	Partita for Glenn Gould	Georges Leroux, Partita pour Glenn Gould
2011	Judith Cowan	Meridian Line	Paul Bélanger, Origine des méridiens
2011	David Scott Hamilton	Exit	Nelly Arcan, Paradis, clef en main
2011	Lazer Lederhendler	Apocalypse for Beginners	Nicolas Dickner, Tarmac
2011	Lazer Lederhendler	Dirty Feet	Edem Awumey, Les pieds sales
2012	Nigel Spencer	Mai at the Predators’ Ball	Marie-Claire Blais, Mai au bal des prédateurs
2012	Sheila Fischman	Ru	Kim Thúy, Ru
2012	Michael Gilson	Mafia Inc.: The Long, Bloody Reign of Canada’s Sicilian Clan	André Cédilot, André Noël, Mafia Inc. : Grandeur et misère du clan sicilien au Québec
2012	John Murrell	The Small Room at the Top of the Stairs and Thinking of Yu	Carole Fréchette, La Petite pièce en haut de l’escalier and Je pense à Yu
2012	Shelley Tepperman	The List	Jennifer Tremblay, La liste
2013	Donald Winkler	The Major Verbs	Pierre Nepveu, Les verbes majeurs
2013	Robert Majzels	For Sure	France Daigle, Pour sûr
2013	Rhonda Mullins	And the Birds Rained Down	Jocelyne Saucier, Il pleuvait des oiseaux
2013	George Tombs	Canada's Forgotten Slaves: Two Hundred Years of Bondage	Marcel Trudel, Deux siècles d’esclavage au Québec
2013	Luise von Flotow	The Stalinist's Wife	France Théoret, La femme du stalinien
2014	Peter Feldstein	Paul-Émile Borduas: A Critical Biography	François-Marc Gagnon, Paul-Émile Borduas (1905–1960) : biographie critique et analyse de l'œuvre
2014	Sheila Fischman	Wonder	Dominique Fortier, Les larmes de saint Laurent
2014	Linda Gaboriau	Christina, The Girl King	Michel Marc Bouchard, Christine, la reine-garçon
2014	Maureen Labonté	And Slowly Beauty	Michel Nadeau, Lentement la beauté
2014	Rhonda Mullins	Guyana	Élise Turcotte, Guyana
2015	Rhonda Mullins	Twenty-One Cardinals	Jocelyne Saucier, Les Héritiers de la mine
2015	David Scott Hamilton	Captive	Claudine Dumont, Anabiose
2015	Lazer Lederhendler	The Lake	Perrine Leblanc, Malabourg
2015	Susan Ouriou, Christelle Morelli	Stolen Sisters: The Story of Two Missing Girls, Their Families and How Canada Has Failed Indigenous Women	Emmanuelle Walter, Sœurs volées: Enquête sur un féminicide au Canada
2015	Donald Winkler	Arvida	Samuel Archibald, Arvida
2016	Lazer Lederhendler	The Party Wall	Catherine Leroux, Le mur mitoyen
2016	Rhonda Mullins	Guano	Louis Carmain, Guano
2016	Neil Smith	The Goddess of Fireflies	Geneviève Pettersen, La déesse des mouches à feu
2017	Oana Avasilichioaei	Readopolis	Bertrand Laverdure, Lectodôme
2017	Katia Grubisic	Brothers	David Clerson, Frères
2017	Howard Scott	Social Myths and Collective Imaginaries	Gérard Bouchard, Raison et déraison du mythe
2017	Pablo Strauss	The Longest Year	Daniel Grenier, L'année la plus longue
2017	W. Donald Wilson	In Search of New Babylon	Dominique Scali, À la recherche de New Babylon
2018	Phyllis Aronoff, Howard Scott	Descent Into Night	Edem Awumey, Explication de la nuit
2018	Vivian Felsen	Jacob Isaac Segal: A Montreal Yiddish Poet and His Milieu	Pierre Anctil, Jacob-Isaac Segal (1896–1954) : un poète yiddish de Montréal et son milieu
2018	Aleshia Jensen	Explosions: Michael Bay and the Pyrotechnics of the Imagination	Mathieu Poulin, Des explosions
2018	Peter McCambridge	Songs for the Cold of Heart	Éric Dupont, La fiancée américaine
2018	Rhonda Mullins	Little Beast	Julie Demers, Barbe
2019	Linda Gaboriau	Birds of a Kind	Wajdi Mouawad, Tous des oiseaux
2019	Louisa Blair	887	Robert Lepage, 887
2019	Sheila Fischman	Vi	Kim Thúy, Vi
2019	Rhonda Mullins	The Embalmer	Anne-Renée Caillé, L'embaumeur
2019	Pablo Strauss	Synapses	Simon Brousseau, Synapses

=== 2020s ===
Year	Author	Title	Translated work	Ref
2020	Lazer Lederhendler	If You Hear Me	Pascale Quiviger, Si tu m'entends	
2020	Oana Avasilichioaei	The Neptune Room	Bertrand Laverdure, La chambre neptune	
2020	Alexis Diamond	Amaryllis & Little Witch	Pascal Brullemans, Vipérine and Petit sorcière	
2020	Pablo Strauss	The Country Will Bring Us No Peace	Matthieu Simard, Ici, ailleurs	
2020	J. C. Sutcliffe	Back Roads	Andrée A. Michaud, Routes secondaires	
2021	Erín Moure	This Radiant Life	Chantal Neveu, La vie radieuse	
2021	Helge Dascher, Rob Aspinall	Paul at Home	Michel Rabagliati, Paul à la maison	
2021	Peter Feldstein	People, State, and War Under the French Regime in Canada	Louise Dechêne, Le Peuple, lʼÉtat et la Guerre au Canada sous le Régime français	
2021	Katia Grubisic	A Cemetery for Bees	Alina Dumitrescu, Le cimetière des abeilles	
2021	Susan Ouriou	The Lover, the Lake	Virginia Pésémapéo Bordeleau, L'amant du lac	
2022	Judith Weisz Woodsworth	History of the Jews in Quebec	Pierre Anctil, Histoire des juifs au Québec	
2022	Aleshia Jensen	Remnants	Céline Huyghebaert, Le drap blanc	
2022	Aleshia Jensen, Bronwyn Haslam	This Is How I Disappear	Mirion Malle, Cʼest comme ça que je disparais	
2022	Susan Ouriou	White Resin	Audrée Wilhelmy, Blanc Résine	
2022	Ben Vrignon	They Called Us Savages: A Hereditary Chiefʼs Quest for Truth and Harmony	Dominique Rankin, Marie-Josée Tardif, On nous appelait les Sauvages : souvenirs et espoirs dʼun chef héréditaire algonquin	
2023	Peter McCambridge	Rosa's Very Own Personal Revolution	Éric Dupont, La Logeuse	
2023	Arielle Aaronson	Alone: The Journeys of Three Young Refugees	Paul Tom, Seuls	
2023	D. M. Bradford	House Within a House	Nicholas Dawson, Désormais, ma demeure	
2023	Émilie Monnet	Okinum	Émilie Monnet, Okinum	
2023	Susan Ouriou	Kukum	Michel Jean, Kukum	
2024	Katia Grubisic	Nights Too Short to Dance	Marie-Claire Blais, Un cœur habité de mille voix	
2024	Melissa Bull	Morel	Maxime Raymond Bock, Morel	
2024	Aleshia Jensen	So Long Sad Love	Mirion Malle, Adieu triste amour	
2024	Lazer Lederhendler	The Hollow Beast	Christophe Bernard, La bête creuse	
2024	Aimee Wall	Sadie X	Clara Dupuis-Morency, Sadie X	
2025	Jessica Moore	Uiesh/Somewhere	Joséphine Bacon, Uiesh/Quelque part	
2025	Phyllis Aronoff, Howard Scott	Farida	Monia Mazigh, Farida	
2025	Helge Dascher, Rob Aspinall	Muybridge	Guy Delisle, Muybridge	
2025	Catherine Khordoc	Baldwin, Styron and Me	Mélikah Abdelmoumen, Baldwin, Styron et moi	
2025	Donald Winkler	May Our Joy Endure	Kev Lambert, Que notre joie demeure	
2026	Katia Grubisic	Together By the Sea	Marie-Claire Blais, Une réunion près de la mer	
2026	Jonathan Kaplansky	The Origin of the Future	Francis Catalano, L'Origine du futur	
2026	Jonathan Kaplansky	The Love of Man	Hélène Rioux, L'Amour des hommes	
2026	Rhonda Mullins	When Water Became Blue	Anaïs Barbeau-Lavalette, Femme fleuve	
2026	Neil Smith	All Kidding Aside	Jean-Christophe Réhel, La Blague du siècle	
