= 2004 Governor General's Awards =

Canadian literary award

The 2004 Governor General's Awards for Literary Merit: Finalists in 14 categories (68 books) were announced October 26, the four children's literature winners announced and presented November 15, other winners announced and presented November 16. The prize for writers and illustrators was $15,000 and "a specially crafted copy of the winning book bound by master bookbinder Pierre Ouvrard".

As introduced in 2003, the four children's literature awards were announced and presented separately from the others. The event at Rideau Hall, the Governor General's residence in Ottawa, was scheduled to begin at 10:00 on a Monday morning. "Children from across the National Capital Region will be invited to attend the event, which will also include readings and workshops related to children's literature.

== English ==
Category	Winner	Nominated
Fiction	Miriam Toews, A Complicated Kindness	David Bezmozgis, Natasha and Other Stories; Trevor Cole, Norman Bray, In the Performance of His Life; Colin McAdam, Some Great Thing; Alice Munro, Runaway
Non-fiction	Roméo Dallaire, Shake Hands With the Devil: The Failure of Humanity in Rwanda	Anne Coleman, I'll Tell You a Secret: A Memory of Seven Summers; Christopher Dewdney, Acquainted With the Night: Excursions Through the World After Dark; Jane Jacobs, Dark Age Ahead; Jan Zwicky, Wisdom & Metaphor
Poetry	Roo Borson, Short Journey Upriver Toward Oishida	Tim Bowling, The Memory Orchard; David Manicom, The Burning Eaves; John Terpstra, Disarmament; Jan Zwicky, Robinson's Crossing
Drama	Morris Panych, Girl in the Goldfish Bowl	Robert Chafe, Butler's Marsh and Tempting Providence; Michael Healey, Rune Arlidge; Karen Hines, The Pochsy Plays; Mieko Ouchi, The Red Priest (Eight Ways to Say Goodbye)
Children's literature	Kenneth Oppel, Airborn	Martine Leavitt, Heck Superhero; Sharon MacKay, Esther; Judd Palmer, The Wolf King; Ange Zhang, Red Land, Yellow River: A Story from the Cultural Revolution
Children's illustration	Stéphane Jorisch, Jabberwocky	Nicolas Debon, Dawn Watch; Marie-Louise Gay, Stella, Princess of the Sky; Kim LaFave, A Very Unusual Dog; Barbara Reid, Peg and the Yeti
French to English translation	Judith Cowan, Mirabel (Pierre Nepveu, Lignes aériennes)	Sheila Fischman, The Alien House (Élise Turcotte); Liedewy Hawke, The Iguana (Denis Thériault)

== French ==
Category	Winner	Nominated
Fiction	Pascale Quiviger, Le cercle parfait	Marguerite Andersen, Parallèles; Katerine Caron, Vous devez être heureuse; Sergio Kokis, Les amants d'Alfama; Didier Leclair, Ce pays qui est le mien
Non-fiction	Jean-Jacques Simard, La Réduction: l'Autochtone inventé et les Amérindiens d'aujourd'hui	Jean-Marie Fecteau, La liberté du pauvre : crime et pauvreté au XIXe siècle québécois; Brian T. Fitch, Le langage de la pensée et l'écriture : Humboldt, Valéry, Beckett; Yvan Lamonde, Histoire sociale des idées au Québec (1896–1929); Roseline Tremblay, L'écrivain imaginaire: essai sur le roman québécois, 1960–1995
Poetry	André Brochu, Les jours à vif	Paul Bélanger, Les jours de l'éclipse; Mario Brassard, Choix d'apocalypses; Louise Dupré, Une écharde sous ton ongle; Pierre Ouellet, Zone franche: liber asylum
Drama	Emma Haché, L'intimité	Franco Catanzariti, Sahel; Alexis Martin, Bureaux; Jean-Frédéric Messier, Au moment de sa disparition; Reynald Robinson, La salle des loisirs
Children's literature	Nicole Leroux, L'Hiver de Léo Polatouche	Édith Bourget, Autour de Gabrielle; Charlotte Gingras, La boîte à bonheur; Marie-Francine Hébert, Le ciel tombe à côté; Nancy Montour, Le coeur au vent
Children's illustration	Janice Nadeau, Nul poisson où aller	Francine Bouchard (Fanny), Le grand rêve de Passepoil; Pascale Constantin, Turlututu, rien ne va plus!; Samuel Parent (Sampar), Savais-tu? Les Hyènes; Alain Reno, Comment l'ours blanc perdit sa queue
English to French translation	Ivan Steenhout, Les Indes accidentelles (Robert Finley, The Accidental Indies)	Claire Dé, Le cahier d'Hellman (Robert Majzels); Carole Noël, Ce qu'il nous reste (Aislinn Hunter); Lori Saint-Martin and Paul Gagné, Le Pas de l'ourse (Douglas Glover, Elle); Claudine Vivier, La Rivière disparue (Brian Doyle, Mary Ann Alice)
