= 2008 Governor General's Awards =

Canadian literary award

The 2008 Governor General's Awards for Literary Merit: Finalists in 14 categories (73 books) were announced October 21, winners announced November 18. The prize for writers and illustrators was $25,000 and "a specially bound copy of the winning book".

== Controversy ==
The Canada Council for the Arts, the award program's administrator, faced some criticism around its nomination of the graphic novel Skim in the Children's Literature category. The nomination was credited to Mariko Tamaki, who wrote the graphic novel's text, but not to her cousin and co-creator Jillian Tamaki, who drew the illustrations.

Two prominent Canadian graphic novelists, Chester Brown and Seth, circulated an open letter to the Canada Council asking them to revise the nomination, arguing that unlike a more traditional illustrated book, a graphic novel's text and illustration are inseparable parts of the work's narrative, and that both women should accordingly be credited as equal co-authors. Their letter was also endorsed by other prominent Canadian and American graphic novelists, including Lynda Barry, Dan Clowes, Art Spiegelman, Chris Ware and Julie Doucet, as well as by Chris Oliveros of Canadian comic and graphic novel publisher Drawn & Quarterly and Peter Birkemore of Toronto comic store The Beguiling.

Melanie Rutledge, a spokesperson for the Canada Council, responded that it was too late to revise the nominations for the 2008 awards, but that the council would take the feedback into account in the future.

The Canada Council later faced controversy over its selection of Jacob Scheier's More to Keep Us Warm as the winner in the poetry category. Di Brandt, one of the poetry award's jurors, was credited by Scheier as a friend and mentor in the book's creation, resulting in debate over whether Brandt should have recused herself from the judging panel.

== English ==
Category	Winner	Nominated
Fiction	Nino Ricci, The Origin of Species	Rivka Galchen, Atmospheric Disturbances; Rawi Hage, Cockroach; David Adams Richards, The Lost Highway; Fred Stenson, The Great Karoo
Non-fiction	Christie Blatchford, Fifteen Days: Stories of Bravery, Friendship, Life and Death from Inside the New Canadian Army	Douglas Hunter, God's Mercies: Rivalry, Betrayal and the Dream of Discovery; Sid Marty, The Black Grizzly of Whiskey Creek; James Orbinski, An Imperfect Offering: Humanitarian Action in the Twenty-first Century; Chris Turner, The Geography of Hope: A Tour of the World We Need
Poetry	Jacob Scheier, More to Keep Us Warm	Weyman Chan, Noise from the Laundry; A. F. Moritz, The Sentinel; Sachiko Murakami, The Invisibility Exhibit; Ruth Roach Pierson, Aide-Mémoire
Drama	Catherine Banks, Bone Cage	Ronnie Burkett, 10 Days on Earth; Paul Ciufo, Reverend Jonah; Marie Clements, Copper Thunderbird; Judith Thompson, Palace of the End
Children's literature	John Ibbitson, The Landing	Alma Fullerton, Libertad; Dianne Linden, Shimmerdogs; Shenaaz Nanji, Child of Dandelions; Mariko Tamaki, Skim
Children's illustration	Stéphane Jorisch, The Owl and the Pussycat (Edward Lear)	Isabelle Arseneault, My Letter to the World and Other Poems (Emily Dickinson); Josée Bisaillon, The Emperor's Second Hand Clothes (Anne Millyard); Matt James, Yellow Moon, Apple Moon (Pamela Porter); Kim LaFave, Shin-chi's Canoe (Nicola Campbell)
French to English translation	Lazer Lederhendler, Nikolski (Nikolski, Nicolas Dickner)	Jo-Anne Elder, Beatitudes (Béatitudes, Herménégilde Chiasson); Liedewy Hawke, The Postman's Round (Le facteur émotif, Denis Thériault); Paul Leduc Browne and Michelle Weinroth, The Making of the Nations and Cultures of the New World (Genèse des nations et cultures du Nouveau Monde, Gérard Bouchard); Fred A. Reed, Orfeo (Orfeo, Hans-Jürgen Greif)

== French ==
Category	Winner	Nominated
Fiction	Marie-Claire Blais, Naissance de Rebecca à l'ère des tourments	Jean-François Beauchemin, Ceci est mon corps; Guillaume Corbeil, L'Art de la fugue; Monique Proulx, Champagne; Jean-Pierre Trépanier, Colomia
Non-fiction	Pierre Ouellet, Hors-temps: poétique de la posthistoire	Adèle Lauzon, Pas si tranquille; Georges Leroux, Partita pour Glenn Gould: musique et forme de vie; André Major, L'esprit vagabond; Louise Warren, La forme et le deuil: archives du lac
Poetry	Michel Pleau, La lenteur du monde	Steve Auger, Le rosier incendiaire; François Charron, Nous aurons tout vécu; Henri Chassé, Morceaux de tempête; Michel A. Thérien, Du vertige et de l'espoir: Carnets africains
Drama	Jennifer Tremblay, La liste	Yvan Bienvenue, La vie continue; Carole Fréchette, Serial Killer et autres pièces courtes; Catherine Mavrikakis, Omaha Beach; Wajdi Mouawad, Le soleil ni la mort ne peuvent se regarder en face
Children's literature	Sylvie Desrosiers, Les trois lieues	Camille Bouchard, Trente-neuf; Charlotte Gingras, Ophélie; François Gravel, Sales crapauds; Carole Tremblay, Fred Poulet enquête sur une chaussette
Children's illustration	Janice Nadeau, Ma meilleure amie (Gilles Tibo)	Philippe Béha, Les pays inventés (Henriette Major); Stéphane Jorisch, Un cadeau pour Sophie (Gilles Vigneault); Marie Lafrance, Le sorcier amoureux (Mireille Levert); Caroline Merola, Quand le chat est parti (Caroline Merola)
English to French translation	Claire Chabalier and Louise Chabalier, Tracey en mille morceaux (The Tracey Fragments, Maureen Medved)	Dominique Bouchard, Les grands lacs: histoire naturelle d'une région en perpétuelle mutation (The Great Lakes: The Natural History of a Changing Region, Wayne Grady); Jean-Marc Dalpé, Roc & rail: Trains fantômes suivi de Slague: l'histoire d'un mineur (Roc'n Rail: Ghost Trains and Spitting Slag, Mansel Robinson); Lori Saint-Martin and Paul Gagné, Big Bang (Bang Crunch, Neil Smith); Sophie Voillot, Logogryphe (The Logogryph, Thomas Wharton)
