= 2014 Governor General's Awards =

Canadian literary award

The shortlisted nominees for the 2014 Governor General's Awards for Literary Merit were announced on October 7, 2014, and the winners were announced on November 18. Each winner was awarded $25,000 from the Canada Council for the Arts.

== English ==
Category	Winner	Nominated
Fiction	Thomas King, The Back of the Turtle	Michael Crummey, Sweetland; Bill Gaston, Juliet Was a Surprise; Claire Holden Rothman, My October; Joan Thomas, The Opening Sky
Non-fiction	Michael Harris, The End of Absence: Reclaiming What We've Lost in a World of Constant Connection	Arno Kopecky, The Oil Man and the Sea: Navigating the Northern Gateway; Edmund Metatawabin and Alexandra Shimo, Up Ghost River: A Chief's Journey Through the Turbulent Waters of Native History; Maria Mutch, Know the Night: A Memoir of Survival in the Small Hours
Poetry	Arleen Paré, Lake of Two Mountains	Christopher Levenson, Night Vision; Garth Martens, Prologue for the Age of Consequence; Sadiqa de Meijer, Leaving Howe Island; Julie Joosten, Light Light
Drama	Jordan Tannahill, Age of Minority: Three Solo Plays	Rick Chafe, The Secret Mask; Sean Dixon, A God in Need of Help; Janet Munsil, That Elusive Spark
Children's literature	Raziel Reid, When Everything Feels Like the Movies	Jonathan Auxier, The Night Gardener; Lesley Choyce, Jeremy Stone; Rachel Qitsualik-Tinsley and Sean Qitsualik-Tinsley, Skraelings; Mariko Tamaki, This One Summer
Children's illustration	Jillian Tamaki, This One Summer	Marie-Louise Gay, Any Questions?; Qin Leng, Hana Hashimoto, Sixth Violin; Renata Liwska, Once Upon a Memory; Julie Morstad, Julia, Child
French to English translation	Peter Feldstein, Paul-Émile Borduas: A Critical Biography (François-Marc Gagnon, Paul-Émile Borduas (1905-1960) : biographie critique et analyse de l'œuvre)	Sheila Fischman, Wonder (Dominique Fortier, Les larmes de saint Laurent); Linda Gaboriau, Christina, The Girl King (Michel Marc Bouchard, Christine, la reine-garçon); Maureen Labonté, And Slowly Beauty (Michel Nadeau, Lentement la beauté); Rhonda Mullins, Guyana (Élise Turcotte, Guyana)

== French ==
Category	Winner	Nominated
Fiction	Andrée A. Michaud, Bondrée	Michael Delisle, Le Feu de mon père; Alain Farah, Pourquoi Bologne; Robert Lalonde, C'est le cœur qui meurt en dernier; Larry Tremblay, L'orangeraie
Non-fiction	Gabriel Nadeau-Dubois, Tenir tête	Catherine Ferland and Dave Corriveau, La Corriveau: De l'histoire à la légende; Bertrand Gervais, Un défaut de fabrication; Nicolas Lévesque and Catherine Mavrikakis, Ce que dit l'écorce; Jean-Jacques Pelletier, Questions d'écriture: Réponses à des lecteurs
Poetry	José Acquelin, Anarchie de la lumière	Joséphine Bacon, Un thé dans la toundra/Nipishapui nete mushuat; Paul Chanel Malenfant, Toujours jamais; Georgette LeBlanc, Prudent; Julie Stanton, Mémorial pour Geneviève et autres tombeaux
Drama	Carole Fréchette, Small Talk	François Archambault, Tu te souviendras de moi; Simon Boudreault, As is (tel quel); Olivier Kemeid, Moi, dans les ruines rouges du siècle; Étienne Lepage, Histoires pour faire des cauchemars
Children's literature	Linda Amyot, Le jardin d'Amsterdam	India Desjardins, Le Noël de Marguerite; Patrick Isabelle, Eux; Jean-François Sénéchal, Feu; Mélanie Tellier, Fiona
Children's illustration	Marianne Dubuc, Le lion et l'oiseau	Pascal Blanchet, Le Noël de Marguerite; Manon Gauthier, Grand-mère, elle et moi...; Isabelle Malenfant, Pablo trouve un trésor; Pierre Pratt, Gustave
English to French translation	Daniel Poliquin, L'Indien malcommode: un portrait inattendu des Autochtones d'Amérique du Nord (Thomas King, The Inconvenient Indian: A Curious Account of Native People in North America)	Éric Fontaine, Les Blondes (Emily Schultz, The Blondes); Hervé Juste, Poisson d'avril (Josip Novakovich, April Fool's Day); Lori Saint-Martin and Paul Gagné, La femme Hokusai (Katherine Govier, The Ghost Brush); Lori Saint-Martin and Paul Gagné, Une brève histoire des Indiens au Canada (Thomas King, A Short History of Indians in Canada)
