= 2003 Governor General's Awards =

Canadian literary award

The 2003 Governor General's Awards for Literary Merit: Finalists in 14 categories (70 books) were announced October 20, the four children's literature winners announced and presented November 10, other winners announced and presented November 12. Each winner received a cheque for $15,000.

The separate announcement and presentation of children's literature awards – four, recognizing text and illustration in English- and French-language books – was a novelty in 2003 (continued for at least a few years). The event at Rideau Hall, the Governor General's residence in Ottawa, was scheduled to begin at 10:00 on a Monday morning. "Children from across the National Capital Region will be invited to attend the event, which will also include readings and workshops related to children's literature."

== English ==
Category	Winner	Nominated
Fiction	Douglas Glover, Elle	Margaret Atwood, Oryx and Crake; Elizabeth Hay, Garbo Laughs; Jean McNeil, Private View; Edeet Ravel, Ten Thousand Lovers
Non-fiction	Margaret MacMillan, Paris 1919: Six Months That Changed the World	Andrew Clark, A Keen Soldier: The Execution of Second World War Private Harold Pringle; Andrew Cohen, While Canada Slept: How We Lost Our Place in the World; Maggie de Vries, Vancouver, for Missing Sarah: A Vancouver Woman Remembers Her Vanished Sister; Ross King, Michelangelo and the Pope's Ceiling
Poetry	Tim Lilburn, Kill-site	Tim Bowling, The Witness Ghost; Evan Jones, Nothing Fell Today But Rain; Anne Simpson, Loop; Tom Wayman, My Father's Cup
Drama	Vern Thiessen, Einstein's Gift	Marie Clements, Burning Vision; Brian Drader, Prok; Sunil Kuruvilla, Rice Boy; Michael MacLennan, Last Romantics
Children's literature	Glen Huser, Stitches	Sarah Ellis, The Several Lives of Orphan Jack; Barbara Haworth-Attard, Theories of Relativity; Kevin Major, Ann and Seamus; Judd Palmer, The Maestro
Children's illustration	Allen Sapp, The Song Within My Heart	Nicolas Debon, Four Pictures by Emily Carr; Rob Gonsalves, Imagine a Night; Barbara Reid, The Subway Mouse; Ludmila Zeman, Sindbad's Secret: From the Tales of the Thousand and One Nights
French to English translation	Jane Brierley, Memoirs of a Less Travelled Road: A Historian's Life	Patricia Claxton, A Sunday at the Pool in Kigali; Jo-Anne Elder, Tales from Dog Island: St. Pierre et Miquelon; David Homel and Fred A. Reed, The Heart Is an Involuntary Muscle; Susan Ouriou, Necessary Betrayals

== French ==
Category	Winner	Nominated
Fiction	Élise Turcotte, La maison étrangère	Jean-François Chassay, L'Angle mort; Marie Gagnier, Console-moi; Gaétan Soucy, Music-Hall!; Larry Tremblay, Le Mangeur de bicyclette
Non-fiction	Thierry Hentsch, Raconter et mourir : aux sources narratives de l'imaginaire occidental	Michel Morin, Vertige! et autres essais a-politiques; Louise Prescott, Le complexe d'Ulysse : signifiance et micropolitique dans la pratique de l'art; François Ricard, Le dernier après-midi d'Agnès: essai sur l'oeuvre de Milan Kundera; Régine Robin, La mémoire saturée
Poetry	Pierre Nepveu, Lignes aériennes	Nicole Brossard, Cahier de roses & de civilisation; Carle Coppens, Le grand livre des entorses; Benoît Jutras, Nous serons sans voix; Louis-Jean Thibault, Géographie des lointains
Drama	Jean-Rock Gaudreault, Deux pas vers les étoiles	François Archambault, La société des loisirs; François Létourneau, Cheech; Wajdi Mouawad, Incendies; Jean-Pierre Ronfard, Écriture pour le théâtre, tome III
Children's literature	Danielle Simard, J'ai vendu ma soeur	Mélissa Anctil, Gigi; Roger Des Roches, Marie Quatdoigts; Laurent Grimon, Le chevalier des Arbres; Paul Chanel Malenfant, Si tu allais quelque part
Children's illustration	Virginie Egger, Recette d'éléphant à la sauce vieux pneu	Geneviève Côté, Le Premier Printemps du monde; Gérard DuBois, Le piano muet; Stéphane Jorisch, Thésée et le Minotaure; Stéphane Poulin, Annabel et la Bête
English to French translation	Agnès Guitard, Un amour de Salomé	Yolande Amzallag, Le canari éthique: science, société et esprit humain; Paule Noyart, L'Or bleu: l'eau, nouvel enjeu stratégique et commercial; Hélène Paré, L'histoire spectacle: le cas du tricentenaire de Québec; Lori Saint-Martin and Paul Gagné, L'analyste
