= 2013 Governor General's Awards =

Canadian literary award

The shortlisted nominees for the 2013 Governor General's Awards for Literary Merit were announced on October 2, and the winners were announced on November 13. Each winner will be awarded $25,000 from the Canada Council for the Arts.

== English ==
Category	Winner	Nominated
Fiction	Eleanor Catton, The Luminaries	Kenneth Bonert, The Lion Seeker; Joseph Boyden, The Orenda; Colin McAdam, A Beautiful Truth; Shyam Selvadurai, The Hungry Ghosts
Non-fiction	Sandra Djwa, A Journey with No Maps: A Life of P. K. Page	Carolyn Abraham, The Juggler's Children: A Journey into Family, Legend and the Genes that Bind Us; Nina Munk, The Idealist: Jeffrey Sachs and the Quest to End Poverty; Allen Smutylo, The Memory of Water; Priscila Uppal, Projection: Encounters with My Runaway Mother
Poetry	Katherena Vermette, North End Love Songs	Austin Clarke, Where the Sun Shines Best; Adam Dickinson, The Polymers; Don Domanski, Bite Down Little Whisper; Russell Thornton, Birds, Metal, Stones & Rain
Drama	Nicolas Billon, Fault Lines: Three Plays	Meg Braem, Blood: A Scientific Romance; Kate Hewlett, The Swearing Jar; Lawrence Jeffery, Frenchtown; Joseph Jomo Pierre, Shakespeare's Nigga
Children's literature	Teresa Toten, The Unlikely Hero of Room 13B	Beverley Brenna, The White Bicycle; Shane Peacock, Becoming Holmes; Jean E. Pendziwol, Once Upon a Northern Night; Valerie Sherrard, Counting Back from Nine
Children's illustration	Matt James, Northwest Passage	Rachel Berman, Miss Mousie's Blind Date; Gary Clement, Oy, Feh, So?; Jon Klassen, The Dark; Julie Morstad, How To
French to English translation	Donald Winkler, The Major Verbs (Pierre Nepveu, Les verbes majeurs)	Robert Majzels, For Sure (France Daigle, Pour sûr); Rhonda Mullins, And the Birds Rained Down (Jocelyne Saucier, Il pleuvait des oiseaux); George Tombs, Canada's Forgotten Slaves: Two Hundred Years of Bondage (Marcel Trudel, Deux siècles d'esclavage au Québec); Luise von Flotow, The Stalinist's Wife (France Théoret, La femme du stalinien)

== French ==
Category	Winner	Nominated
Fiction	Stéphanie Pelletier, Quand les guêpes se taisent	Sergio Kokis, Culs-de-sac; Roger Magini, Ilitch, mort ou vif; Marc Séguin, Hollywood; Gérald Tougas, Le deuxième train de la nuit
Non-fiction	Yvon Rivard, Aimer, enseigner	Alain Deneault, Gouvernance: le management totalitaire; Jean-Jacques Pelletier, La fabrique de l'extrême : les pratiques ordinaires de l'excès; Dominique Perron, L'Alberta autophage : identités, mythes et discours du pétrole dans l'Ouest canadien; Joseph Yvon Thériault, Évangéline : contes d'Amérique
Poetry	René Lapierre, Pour les désespérés seulement	Mario Brassard, Le livre clarière; Marie-Andrée Gill, Béante; Diane Régimbald, L'insensée rayonne; Rodney Saint-Éloi, Jacques Roche, je t'écris cette lettre
Drama	Fanny Britt, Bienveillance	Michel Marc Bouchard, Christine, la reine-garçon; Olivier Choinière, Nom de domaine; Véronique Côté, Tout ce qui tombe; Érika Tremblay-Roy, Petite vérité inventée
Children's literature	Geneviève Mativat, À l'ombre de la grande maison	Camille Bouchard, D'or et de poussière; Fanny Britt, Jane, le renard et moi; Emmanuelle Caron, Gladys et Vova; Lili Chartrand, Le monde fabuleux de Monsieur Fred
Children's illustration	Isabelle Arsenault, Jane, le renard et moi	Jacinthe Chevalier, Aujourd'hui, le ciel; Marianne Dubuc, Au carnaval des animaux; Stéphane Jorisch, Quand je serai grand; Rogé, Mingan, mon village
English to French translation	Sophie Voillot, L'enfant du jeudi (Alison Pick, Far to Go)	Rachel Martinez, Les maux d'Ambroise Bukowski (Susin Nielsen, Word Nerd); Daniel Poliquin, Du village à la ville: comment les migrants changent le monde (Doug Saunders, Arrival City: The Final Migration and Our Next World); Hélène Rioux, Le cousin (John Calabro, The Cousin); Lori Saint-Martin and Paul Gagné, Jamais je ne t'oublierai (Miriam Toews, Swing Low: A Life)
