= 2002 Governor General's Awards =

Canadian literary award

The 2002 Governor General's Awards for Literary Merit were presented by Adrienne Clarkson, Governor General of Canada, at a ceremony at Rideau Hall on Tuesday, November 19. Each winner received a cheque for $15,000.

== English ==
Category	Winner	Nominated
Fiction	Gloria Sawai, A Song for Nettie Johnson	David Bergen, The Case of Lena S.; Ann Ireland, Exile; Wayne Johnston, The Navigator of New York; Carol Shields, Unless
Non-fiction	Andrew Nikiforuk, Saboteurs: Wiebo Ludwig's War Against Big Oil	Carolyn Abraham, Possessing Genius: The Bizarre Odyssey of Einstein's Brain; Jill Frayne, Starting Out in the Afternoon: A Mid-Life Journey into Wild Land; Stephen Henighan, When Words Deny the World: The Reshaping of Canadian Writing; Don McKay, Vis à Vis: Field Notes on Poetry & Wilderness
Poetry	Roy Miki, Surrender	Tammy Armstrong, Bogman's Music; Colin Browne, Ground Water; Kathy Mac, Nail Builders Plan for Strength and Growth; Erín Moure, O Cidadán
Drama	Kevin Kerr, Unity (1918)	Claudia Dey, The Gwendolyn Poems; Lorena Gale, Je me souviens; Michael MacLennan, The Shooting Stage
Children's literature	Martha Brooks, True Confessions of a Heartless Girl	Alan Cumyn, The Secret Life of Owen Skye; Deborah Ellis, Parvana's Journey; John Lekich, The Losers' Club; Karen Levine, Hana's Suitcase
Children's illustration	Wallace Edwards, Alphabeasts	Brian Deines, Dragonfly Kites/pimihákanisa; Marie-Louise Gay, Stella, Fairy of the Forest; Rogé, When Pigs Fly; Janie Jaehyun Park, The Tiger and the Dried Persimmon
French to English translation	Nigel Spencer, Thunder and Light	Sheila Fischman, Twelve Opening Acts; Linda Gaboriau, Impromptu on Nun's Island; Liedewy Hawke, The Milky Way; Lazer Lederhendler, Larry Volt

== French ==
Category	Winner	Nominated
Fiction	Monique LaRue, La Gloire de Cassiodore	Guy Demers, L'Intime; Monique Proulx, Le Cœur est un muscle involontaire; Hélène Vachon, La tête ailleurs; Pierre Yergeau, La désertion
Non-fiction	Judith Lavoie, Mark Twain et la parole noire	Claude Lévesque, Par-delà le masculin et le féminin; Lucie K. Morriset, La mémoire du paysage — Histoire de la forme urbain d'un centre-ville: Saint-Roch, Québec; Élisabeth Nardout-Lafarge, Réjean Ducharme: Une poétique du débris; Émile Ollivier, Repérages
Poetry	Robert Dickson, Humains paysages en temps de paix relative	Anne-Marie Alonzo, ...et la nuit; René Lapierre, Piano; Paul-Marie Lapointe, Espèces fragiles; Louise Warren, La lumière, l'arbre, le trait
Drama	Daniel Danis, Le Langue-à-Langue des chiens de roche	Carole Fréchette, Jean et Béatrice; Wajdi Mouawad, Rêves; Reynald Robinson, L'Hôtel des Horizons; Pierre-Michel Tremblay, Le rire de la mer
Children's literature	Hélène Vachon, L'oiseau de passage	Dominique Demers, Ta voix dans la nuit; François Gravel, David et la maison de la sorcière; Sylvain Meunier, Le seul ami; Pierre Roy, Une tonne de patates!
Children's illustration	Luc Melanson, Le grand voyage de Monsieur	Philippe Béha, La reine rouge; Jean-Marie Benoit, Le voyage à l'envers; Guy England, L'ami perdu; Mylène Pratt, Décroche-moi la lune
English to French translation	Paule Noyart, Histoire universelle de la chasteté et du célibat	Florence Bernard, F. R. Scott: une vie; Jean Paré, La révolution des droits; Carole Sadelain, La nature des économies
