= 1997 Governor General's Awards =

The winners of the 1997 Governor General's Literary Awards were announced on November 18 by Donna Scott, Chairman of the Canada Council for the Arts. Each winner received a cheque for $10,000.

== English ==
Category	Winner	Nominated
Fiction	Jane Urquhart, The Underpainter	Sandra Birdsell, The Two-Headed Calf; Matt Cohen, Last Seen; Elizabeth Hay, Small Change; Eric McCormack, First Blast of the Trumpet Against the Monstrous Regiment of Women
Non-fiction	Rachel Manley, Drumblair – Memories of a Jamaican Childhood	Wade Davis, One River: Explorations and Discoveries in the Amazon Rain Forest; Catherine Dunphy, Morgentaler: A Difficult Hero; Terry Glavin, This Ragged Place – Travels Across the Landscape; Blair Stonechild and Bill Waiser, Loyal till Death – Indians and the North-West Rebellion
Poetry	Dionne Brand, Land to Light On	Marilyn Bowering, Autobiography; Patrick Friesen, A Broken Bowl; Carole Glasser Langille, In Cannon Cave; Don McKay, Apparatus
Drama	Ian Ross, FareWel	Maureen Hunter, Atlantis; Lee MacDougall, High Life; Jason Sherman, Reading Hebron; Judith Thompson, Sled
Children's literature	Kit Pearson, Awake and Dreaming	Cheryl Foggo, One Thing That's True; James Heneghan, Wish Me Luck; Teddy Jam, The Fishing Summer; Barbara Nichol, Dippers
Children's illustration	Barbara Reid, The Party	Blair Drawson, Flying Dimitri; Marie-Louise Gay, Rumpelstiltskin; Robin Muller, The Angel Tree; Ludmila Zeman, The First Red Maple Leaf
French to English translation	Howard Scott, The Euguelion	Jane Brierley, Canadians of Old; Patricia Claxton, Baroque at Dawn; David Homel, A Drifting Year; Nancy Huston, The Goldberg Variations

== French ==
Category	Winner	Nominated
Fiction	Aude, Cet imperceptible mouvement	Bernard Assiniwi, La Saga des Béothuks; Lise Bissonnette, Quittes et Doubles – Scènes de réciprocité; Pierre Morency, La Vie entière – Histoires naturelles du Nouveau Monde; Pierre Ouellet, Légende dorée
Non-fiction	Roland Viau, Enfants du néant et mangeurs d'âmes – Guerre, culture et société en Iroquoisie ancienne	Fernand Dumont, Une foi partagée; Yolande Geadah, Femmes voilées, intégrismes démasqués; Alain Bernard Marchand, Tintin au pays de la ferveur; François Ricard, Gabrielle Roy – Une vie
Poetry	Pierre Nepveu, Romans-fleuves	Nicole Brossard, Vertige de l'avant-scène; Serge Legagneur, Poèmes choisis, 1961–1997; Paul Chanel Malenfant, Fleuves; Hélène Monette, Plaisirs et Paysages kitsch
Drama	Yvan Bienvenue, Dits et Inédits	Jasmine Dubé, La Bonne Femme; Marie-Line Laplante, Une tache sur la lune; Robert Marinier, L'Insomnie; Larry Tremblay, Ogre – Cornemuse
Children's literature	Michel Noël, Pien	Dominique Demers, Maïna, tomes 1 et 2; Agathe Génois, Sarah, je suis là!; Jacques Godbout, Une leçon de chasse; Maryse Pelletier, Une vie en éclats
Children's illustration	Stéphane Poulin, Poil de serpent, dent d'araignée	Leanne Franson, L'Ourson qui voulait une Juliette; Stéphane Jorisch, Casse-Noisette; Gilles Tibo, Simon et le petit cirque
English to French translation	Marie José Thériault, Arracher les montagnes	François Barcelo, La Face cachée des pierres; Nicole Côté, Verre de tempête; Pierrot Lambert, L'Insight: Étude de la compréhension humaine
