= 2009 Governor General's Awards =

Canadian literary award

The shortlisted nominees for the 2009 Governor General's Awards for Literary Merit were announced on October 14, and winning titles were announced on November 17 (see 2009 in poetry). Each winner will receive a cheque for $25,000 and a copy of their book bound by Montreal bookbinder Lise Dubois.

== English ==
Category	Winner	Nominated
Fiction	Kate Pullinger, The Mistress of Nothing	Michael Crummey, Galore; Annabel Lyon, The Golden Mean; Alice Munro, Too Much Happiness; Deborah Willis, Vanishing and Other Stories
Non-fiction	M. G. Vassanji, A Place Within: Rediscovering India	Randall Hansen, Fire and Fury: The Allied Bombing of Germany, 1942-45; Trevor Herriot, Grass, Sky, Song: Promise and Peril in the World of Grassland Birds; Eric Margolis, American Raj: Liberation or Domination? (Resolving the Conflict Between the West and the Muslim World); Eric Siblin, The Cello Suites: J.S. Bach, Pablo Casals, and the Search for a Baroque Masterpiece
Poetry	David Zieroth, The Fly in Autumn	David McFadden, Be Calm, Honey; Philip Kevin Paul, Little Hunger; Sina Queyras, Expressway; Carmine Starnino, This Way Out
Drama	Kevin Loring, Where the Blood Mixes	Beverley Cooper, Innocence Lost: A Play about Steven Truscott; Joan MacLeod, Another Home Invasion; Hannah Moscovitch, East of Berlin; Michael Nathanson, Talk
Children's literature	Caroline Pignat, Greener Grass: The Famine Years	Shelley Hrdlitschka, Sister Wife; Sharon Jennings, Home Free; Robin Stevenson, A Thousand Shades of Blue; Tim Wynne-Jones, The Uninvited
Children's illustration	Jirina Marton, Bella's Tree	Rachel Berman, Bradley McGogg, the Very Fine Frog; Irene Luxbacher, The Imaginary Garden; Luc Melanson, My Great Big Mamma; Ningeokuluk Teevee, Alego
French to English translation	Susan Ouriou, Pieces of Me (La liberte? Connais pasa, Charlotte Gingras)	Phyllis Aronoff and Howard Scott, A Slight Case of Fatigue (Un peu de fatigue, Stéphane Bourguignon); Jo-Anne Elder, One (Seul on est, Serge Patrice Thibodeau); David Homel and Fred A. Reed, Wildlives (Champagne, Monique Proulx); Fred A. Reed, Empire of Desire: The Abolition of Time (Le temps aboli: l'Occident et ses grands recits, Thierry Hentsch)

== French ==
Category	Winner	Nominated
Fiction	Julie Mazzieri, Le discours sur la tombe de l'idiot	Jean-François Beauchemin, Cette année s'envole ma jeunesse; Nadine Bismuth, Êtes-vous mariée à un psychopathe?; Dominique Fortier, Du bon usage des étoiles; Aki Shimazaki, Zakuro
Non-fiction	Nicole V. Champeau, Pointe Maligne: l'infiniment oubliée	Djemila Benhabib, Ma vie à contre-Coran: une femme témoigne sur les islamistes; Claude Fournier, À force de vivre: mémoires; Céline Lafontaine, La société postmortelle: la mort, l'individu et le lien social à l'ère des communications; Charles Le Blanc, Le complexe d'Hermès: regards philosophiques sur la traduction
Poetry	Hélène Monette, Thérèse pour joie et orchestre	Normand de Bellefeuille, Mon nom; René Lapierre, Traité de physique; Philippe More, Brouillons pour un siècle abstrait; André Roy, Les espions de Dieu
Drama	Suzanne Lebeau, Le bruit des os qui craquent	Évelyne de la Chenelière, Les pieds des anges; François Godin, Je suis d'un would be pays; Olivier Kemeid, L'Énéide; Louis-Dominique Lavigne, Glouglou
Children's literature	Hervé Bouchard, Harvey	Jocelyn Boisvert, Mort et déterré; Pierre Chartray and Sylvie Rancourt, Simon et le chasseur de dragons; Michèle Laframboise, La quête de Chaaas, tome 2 – Les vents de Tammerlan; Matthieu Simard, Pavel, épisode 1 – Plus vivant que toutes les pornstars réunies
Children's illustration	Janice Nadeau, Harvey	Philippe Béha, Ulysse et Pénélope; Gérard DuBois, Henri au jardin d'enfants; Pierre Pratt, L'étoile de Sarajevo; Rogé, La vraie histoire de Léo Pointu
English to French translation	Paule Noyart, Le miel d'Harar (Sweetness in the Belly, Camilla Gibb)	Sylvie Nicolas, Lundi sans faute (Right Away Monday, Joel Thomas Hynes); Hélène Rioux, Certitudes (Certainty, Madeleine Thien); Lori Saint-Martin and Paul Gagné, Cartes postales de l'enfer (The Soul of All Great Designs, Neil Bissoondath); Lori Saint-Martin and Paul Gagné, La veuve (The Outlander, Gil Adamson)
