= Rhonda Mullins =

Canadian literary translator (born 1966)

- Born: 1966 (age 59–60)
- Occupation: translator
- Writing career
- Period: 2010s–present
- Notable works: Twenty-One Cardinals, Guano

Rhonda Mullins (born 1966) is a Canadian literary translator, who won the Governor General's Award for French to English translation at the 2015 Governor General's Awards for Twenty-One Cardinals, her translation of Jocelyne Saucier's Les Héritiers de la mine.

She has been a shortlisted nominee for the award on four other occasions: at the 2007 Governor General's Awards for The Decline of the Hollywood Empire (Hervé Fischer, Le déclin de l’empire hollywoodien); at the 2013 Governor General's Awards for And the Birds Rained Down (Jocelyne Saucier, Il pleuvait des oiseaux); at the 2014 Governor General's Awards for Guyana (Élise Turcotte); and at the 2016 Governor General's Awards for Guano (Louis Carmain).

She is an alumna of Concordia University and the University of Ottawa.
