= Liedewy Hawke =

Dutch-Canadian literary translator

- Born: Liedewij Hawke; De Bilt, Netherlands
- Occupation: translator
- Writing career
- Period: 1980s-present

Liedewij Hawke, usually credited as Liedewy Hawke in English, is a Dutch/Canadian literary translator.

== Biography ==
Originally from De Bilt, Netherlands, she was educated at the University of Utrecht and moved to Canada in 1963 to study at the University of Toronto.

She worked for several years at CJBC, the Toronto station of Radio-Canada's talk radio network.

Hawke translates both Dutch language and French language literature into English.

== Awards and honours ==
In 1987, Hawke won the John Glassco Translation Prize and the Canada Council Translation Prize for Hopes and Dreams, The Diary of Henriette Dessaulles 1874-1881, her translation of the diaries of Henriette Dessaulles. She is also a four-time nominee for the Governor General's Award for French to English translation, garnering nominations at the 2002 Governor General's Awards for The Milky Way (Louise Dupré, La Voie lactée), at the 2004 Governor General's Awards for The Iguana (Denis Thériault, L'Iguane), at the 2008 Governor General's Awards for The Postman's Round (Denis Thériault, Le Facteur émotif) and at the 2010 Governor General's Awards for High-Wire Summer (Louise Dupré, L'été funambule).
