= Peter Feldstein (translator) =

Canadian literary translator

- Born: 1962 (age 63–64)
- Occupation: translator
- Writing career
- Notable work: Paul-Émile Borduas: A Critical Biography

Peter Feldstein (born 1962) is a Canadian literary translator, who won the Governor General's Award for French to English translation at the 2014 Governor General's Awards for Paul-Émile Borduas: A Critical Biography, his translation of François-Marc Gagnon's Paul-Émile Borduas (1905-1960) : biographie critique et analyse de l'œuvre, a biography of painter Paul-Émile Borduas.

A resident of Montreal, Quebec, he specializes in non-fiction literature, including biography and social science texts.

== Works ==
- Quebec Identity (Jocelyn Maclure, Récits identitaires) - 2003
- Rent Boys: The World of Male Sex Trade Workers (Michel Dorais, Travailleurs du sexe) - 2005
- Hummocks: Journeys and Inquiries Among the Canadian Inuit (Jean Malaurie, Hummocks) — 2007
- African American Pioneers of Sociology (Pierre Saint-Arnaud, L'invention de la sociologie noire aux États-Unis d'Amérique) - 2009
- Gangs and Girls (Michel Dorais and Patrice Corriveau, Jeunes filles sous influence) - 2009
- Paul-Émile Borduas: A Critical Biography (François-Marc Gagnon, Paul-Émile Borduas (1905-1960) : biographie critique et analyse de l'œuvre) - 2014
- The Idea of Liberty in Canada During the Age of Atlantic Revolutions, 1776-1838 (Michel Ducharme, Le Concept de liberté au Canada à l’époque des Révolutions atlantiques 1776-1838) — 2014
