= Thierry Hentsch =

Swiss-Canadian philosopher and political scientist (1944 – 2005)

Thierry Hentsch (August 7, 1944 – July 7, 2005) was a Swiss-Canadian philosopher and political scientist. He is most noted for his books Raconter et mourir : aux sources narratives de l’imaginaire occidental, which won the Governor General's Award for French-language non-fiction at the 2003 Governor General's Awards, and Le temps aboli: l’Occident et ses grands récits, which was a nominee in the same category at the 2006 Governor General's Awards.

Translator Fred A. Reed was also a two-time winner of the Governor General's Award for French to English translation for his English translations of Hentsch's works, winning at the 1992 Governor General's Awards for Imagining the Middle East (L'Orient imaginaire) and at the 2005 Governor General's Awards for Truth or Death: The Quest for Immortality in the Western Narrative Tradition (Raconter et mourir), and was a shortlisted finalist at the 2009 Governor General's Awards for Empire of Desire: The Abolition of Time (Le temps aboli).

Born in Lausanne, Switzerland, Hentsch was educated at the University of Lausanne and the University of Geneva's Graduate Institute of International Studies. He worked for the International Committee of the Red Cross and the University of Geneva before moving to Canada in 1975 to accept an academic position with the Université du Québec à Montréal. He was the head of the university's political science department from 1998 to 2001.

Hentsch died of pancreatic cancer in 2005, just days before the publication of Le temps aboli.
