= Michael John Harris =

Canadian author and journalist

Michael Harris
- Born: 1980 (age 45–46)
- Occupations: non-fiction, journalism, young adult literature
- Writing career
- Period: 2010s–present
- Notable work: The End of Absence: Reclaiming What We’ve Lost in a World of Constant Connection (2014) Solitude: In Pursuit of A Singular Life in a Crowded World (2017)

Michael Harris is a Canadian author and journalist. His first book, The End of Absence: Reclaiming What We’ve Lost in a World of Constant Connection won the Governor General's Award for English-language non-fiction at the 2014 Governor General's Awards. It was also long-listed for both the RBC Charles Taylor Prize and the B.C. National Nonfiction Award. The End of Absence is a reported memoir about living through a "Gutenberg Moment." It is a portrait of the last generation in history to remember life before the Internet. By describing the constant connectivity of contemporary life, Harris explores the idea that lack and absence are actually human virtues being stripped from us.

Harris's argument about online life was extended in his second work, Solitude: In Pursuit of a Singular Life in a Crowded World. In it, he argues that solitude should be thought of as a resource that has been exploited and monetized by devices and platform technologies.

In 2021, Harris published a third book, All We Want: Building the Life We Cannot Buy, which describes the emergence of consumer culture and proposes a paradigm shift in the way we measure our lives as a climate emergency forces radical change.

Harris worked as an editor for Vancouver Magazine and Western Living, and his essays have appeared in Esquire, Wired, Salon, Huffington Post, The Globe and Mail, and The Walrus. His journalism has been nominated for both the Western Magazine Awards and the National Magazine Awards.

In 2012, he also published the young adult novel Homo, about a gay teenager struggling with coming out in high school.
