= Shelley Tepperman =

Canadian filmmaker, writer and translator

- Born: Toronto, Ontario
- Occupation: Filmmaker
- Website: shelleytepperman.com

Shelley Tepperman is a Quebec-based Canadian filmmaker, writer and translator. She has been nominated for the Governor General's Award for French to English translation multiple times.

== Early life and education ==
Tepperman was born in Toronto. She has a BA in Canadian Studies from the University of Toronto and an MA from the Université du Québec à Montréal in Art Dramatique.

== Works ==
Translations:

- La Repetition - originally by Dominic Champagne
- In Vitro – originally written by Yvan Bienvenue
- Wedding Day At The Cro-Magnons – originally written by Wajdi Mouawad
- The Tale Of Joan Avark – originally written by Louise Bombardier
- Unsettling Accounts – originally written by Yvan Bienvenue
- The Winners – originally written by Francois Archambault
- Alphonse – originally written by Wajdi Mouawad
- Tideline – originally written by Wajdi Mouawad
- Moliere – originally written by Sabina Berman
- Life Savers – originally written by Serge Boucher
- Between Pancho Villa and a Naked Woman – originally written by Sabina Berman
- Pacamambo – originally written by Wajdi Mouawad
- The List – originally written by Jennifer Tremblay
- The Carousel – originally written by Jennifer Tremblay
- In My Paper House – originally written by Philippe Dorin
- The Deliverance – originally written by Jennifer Tremblay

Films:

- 2026: Il Paese: The Village - self-produced

== Awards ==
Year	Award	Category	Work	Result	Ref.
1994	Governor General's Award	French to English translation	La Repetition (originally by Dominic Champagne)	Nominated	
1996	Governor General's Award	French to English translation	In Vitro (originally by Yvan Bienvenue)	Nominated	
2012	Governor General's Award	French to English translation	The List (originally by Jennifer Tremblay)	Nominated	
