= Peter McCambridge =

Canadian literary translator

Peter McCambridge is a Canadian literary translator. He is most noted as winner the Governor General's Award for French to English translation at the 2023 Governor General's Awards for Rosa's Very Own Personal Revolution, his translation of Éric Dupont's novel La Logeuse.

He was previously nominated in the same category at the 2018 Governor General's Awards for Songs for the Cold of Heart, his translation of Dupont's novel La fiancée américaine, which was also shortlisted for the 2018 Giller Prize.

Born and raised in Ireland, McCambridge was educated at Cambridge University and has been based in Quebec City since 2003. He is the fiction editor of QC Fiction, an imprint of Baraka Books which specializes in English translations of Quebec literature.
