= Jocelyne Saucier =

Canadian novelist and journalist

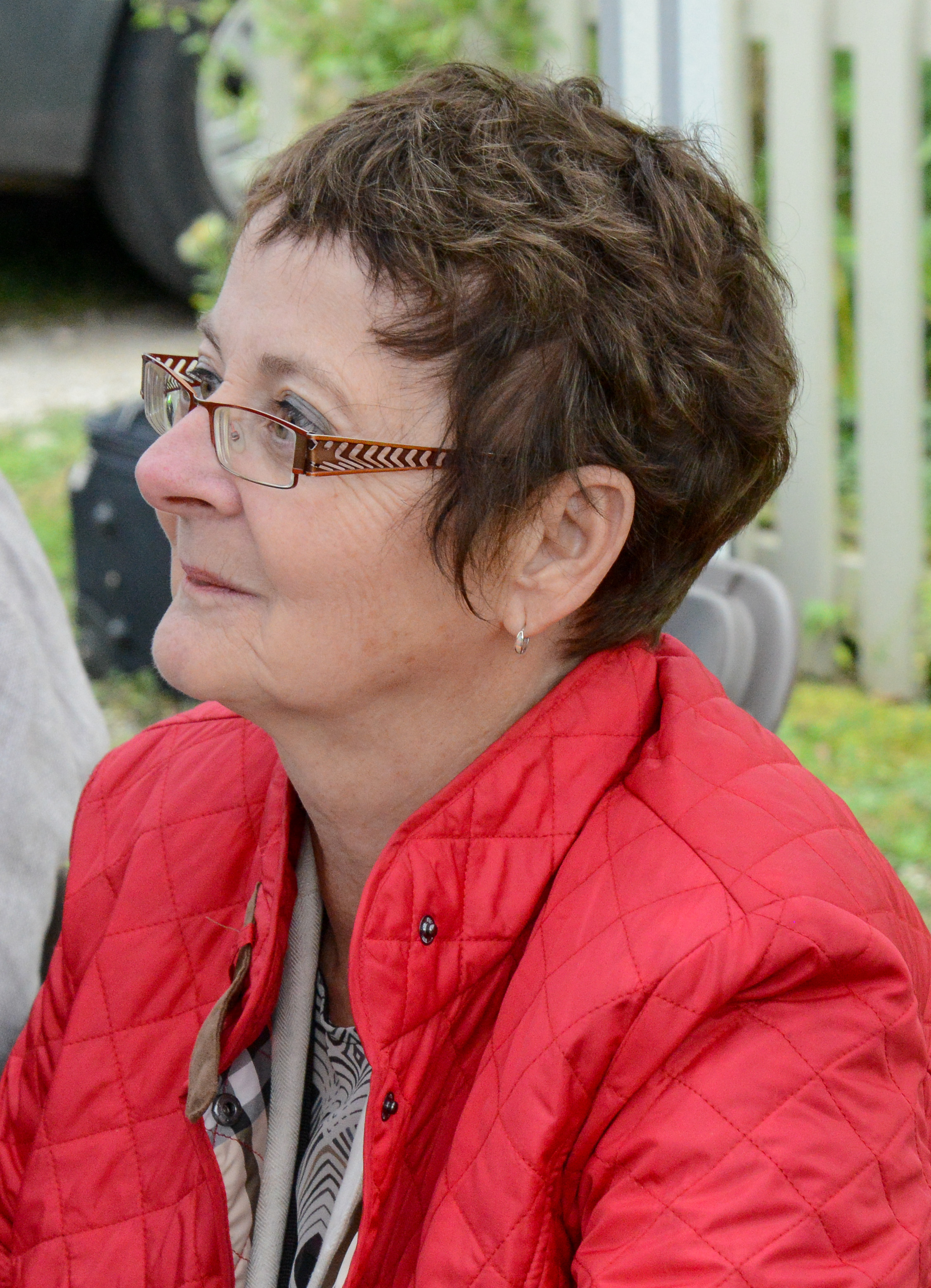
- Saucier at the Eden Mills Writers' Festival in 2015
- Born: May 27, 1948 (age 78); Clair, New Brunswick, Canada
- Education: Université Laval
- Occupations: novelist, journalist
- Writing career
- Language: French
- Period: 1990s–present
- Genre: fiction
- Notable work: Il pleuvait des oiseaux
- Notable awards: Prix Ringuet, Prix France-Québec, Prix des cinq continents de la francophonie

Jocelyne Saucier (born May 27, 1948 in Clair, New Brunswick) is a Canadian novelist and journalist based in Quebec.

== Career ==
Educated in political science at the Université Laval, Saucier worked as a journalist in the Abitibi-Témiscamingue region of Quebec before publishing her debut novel, La Vie comme une image, in 1996. That book was a finalist for the Governor General's Award for French-language fiction at the 1996 Governor General's Awards. Her second novel, Les Héritiers de la mine, was a finalist for the Prix France-Québec in 2001, and her third novel, Jeanne sur les routes, was a finalist at the 2006 Governor General's Awards. Her fourth novel, Il pleuvait des oiseaux, won the Prix France-Québec, the Prix Ringuet, the Prix des cinq continents de la francophonie, the Prix des lecteurs de Radio-Canada and the Prix littéraire des collégiens, while And the Birds Rained Down, its English translation by Rhonda Mullins, was a finalist for the Governor General's Award for French to English translation at the 2013 Governor General's Awards.

Il pleuvait des oiseaux was selected for the 2013 edition of Le Combat des livres, where it was championed by dancer and broadcaster Geneviève Guérard. And the Birds Rained Down was defended by Martha Wainwright in the 2015 edition of Canada Reads.

A film adaptation of Il pleuvait des oiseaux by director Louise Archambault was released to theatres in 2019.

== Works ==
- La Vie comme une image (1996, ISBN 2-89261-152-0)
  - English translation House of Sighs (2001)
- Les Héritiers de la mine (2000, ISBN 2-89261-285-3)
  - English translation Twenty-One Cardinals (2015)
- Jeanne sur les routes (2006, ISBN 2-89261-449-X)
  - English translation Jeanne's Road (2010)
- Il pleuvait des oiseaux. XYZ, Montréal 2011, ISBN 978-2-89261-604-0; Gallimard, Paris 2015 ISBN 207045875X
  - English translation And the Birds Rained Down by Rhonda Mullins. Coach House, Toronto 2012 ISBN 1552452689; Coach House, London 2015 ISBN 1552452689
- À train perdu (2020)
  - English translation And Miles To Go Before I Sleep (2022)
