= Louis Carmain =

Canadian writer

- Born: 1983 (age 42–43); Quebec City
- Occupation: novelist
- Writing career
- Period: 2010s–present
- Notable work: Guano

Louis Carmain is a Canadian writer. His debut novel Guano, published in 2013, won the 2014 Prix littéraire des collégiens, and its English translation by Rhonda Mullins was a shortlisted finalist for the Governor General's Award for French to English translation at the 2016 Governor General's Awards.

His second novel, Bunyip, was published in 2014.

His third novel, Les offrandes, was published in 2019. It was a finalist in the 2020 edition of the Prix litteraire des collégiens.
