= Stéphanie Pelletier =

Canadian writer from Quebec (born 1980)

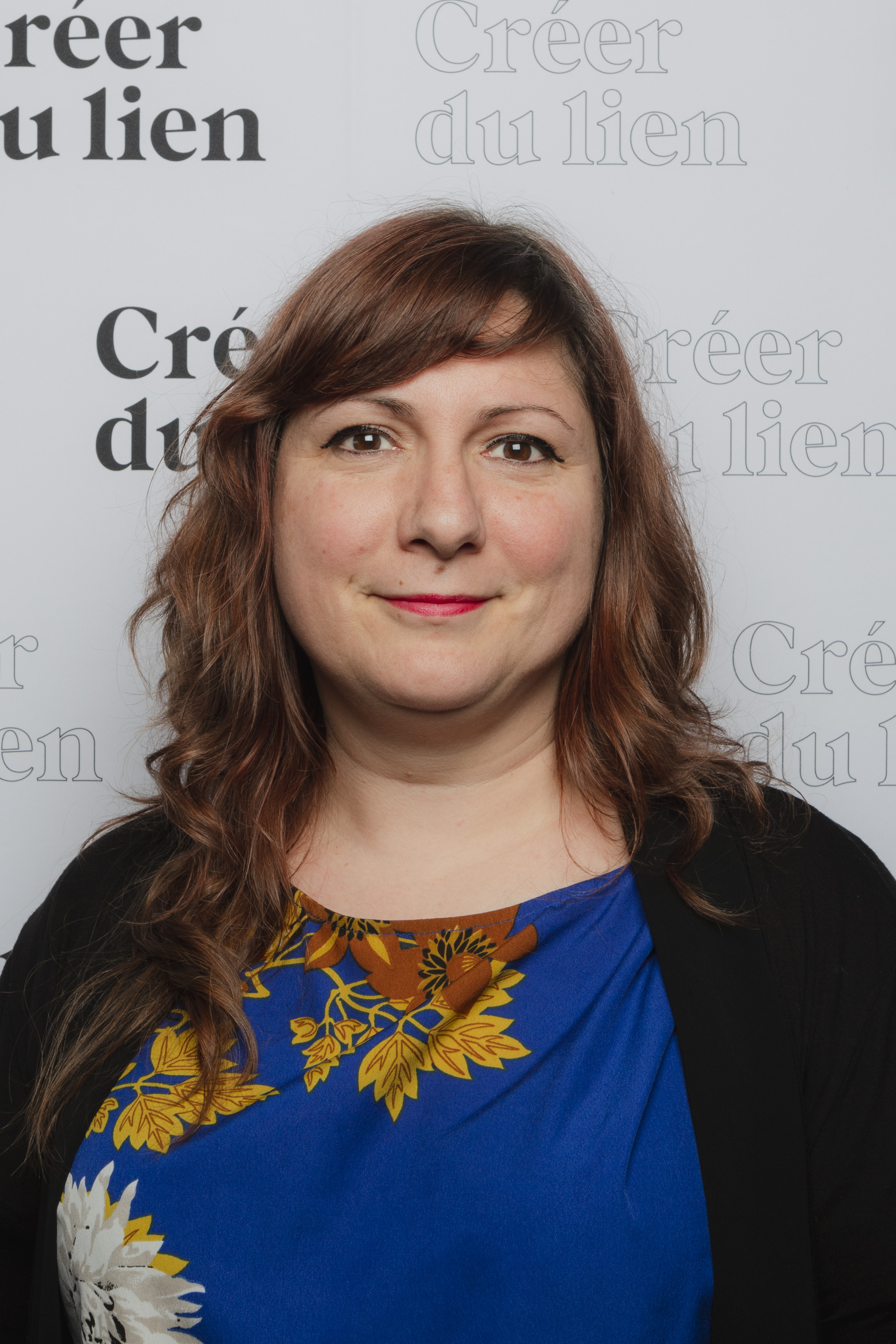
- Stéphanie Pelletier, november 2022.
- Born: c. 1980
- Occupations: novelist, short story writer
- Writing career
- Period: 2010s-present
- Notable work: Quand les guêpes se taisent
- Notable awards: Governor General's Award for French-language fiction (2013)

Stéphanie Pelletier is a Canadian writer from Quebec, whose short story collection Quand les guêpes se taisent won the Governor General's Award for French-language fiction at the 2013 Governor General's Awards.

She followed up with Dagaz, her debut novel, in 2014.
