= Éric Dupont (writer) =

Canadian writer (born 1970)

Éric Dupont (born June 16, 1970) is a Canadian writer from Quebec. His 2006 novel La Logeuse was the winner of the 2008 edition of Le Combat des livres, and his 2012 novel La fiancée américaine was a competing title in the 2013 edition of the program; the latter novel's English translation, Songs for the Cold of Heart, was shortlisted for the 2018 Scotiabank Giller Prize.

Dupont was born and raised in Amqui, Quebec, and studied at Carleton University, the Free University of Berlin, the Université de Montréal, and the University of Toronto. In addition to his writing career, he teaches English to French translation and continuing education courses at McGill University.

== Writing career ==
His debut novel, Voleurs de sucre, was published in 2005, and won the Prix Senghor and the Prix Jovette-Bernier. Its English translation, Sugar Thieves, was issued in 2012.

La Logeuse, his second novel, was published in 2006. It was championed by journalist Nicolas Langelier in the 2008 edition of Ici Radio-Canada Première's battle of the books Le Combat des livres, winning the competition. An English translation, Rosa's Very Own Revolution, was published in 2023.

His third novel, Bestiaire, followed in 2008. Its English translation, Life in the Court of Matane, appeared in 2016 as the first title ever published by QC Fiction, a publishing house which specializes in English translations of Québécois literature. La fiancée américaine followed in 2012, with its English translation Songs for the Cold of Heart being published in 2018.

His novel La route du lilas was published in 2018. La ricaneuse came out in 2024 and was translated as The Colour of Time, Or, The Incredible Story of Mary Gallagher, released in 2026.

Peter McCambridge has received two nominations for the Governor General's Award for French to English translation for his translations of Dupont's work, at the 2018 Governor General's Awards for Songs for the Cold of Heart and at the 2023 Governor General's Awards for Rosa's Very Own Personal Revolution.

== Bibliography ==
- Voleurs de sucre, 2005 (Sugar Thieves, 2012)
- La Logeuse, 2006 (Rosa's Very Own Personal Revolution, 2023)
- Bestiaire, 2008 (Life in the Court of Matane, 2016)
- La fiancée américaine, 2012 (Songs for the Cold of Heart, 2018)
- La route du lilas, 2018
- La ricaneuse, 2024 (The Colour of Time, Or, The Incredible Story of Mary Gallagher, 2026)
