= Jean-François Beauchemin =

Canadian writer (born 1960)

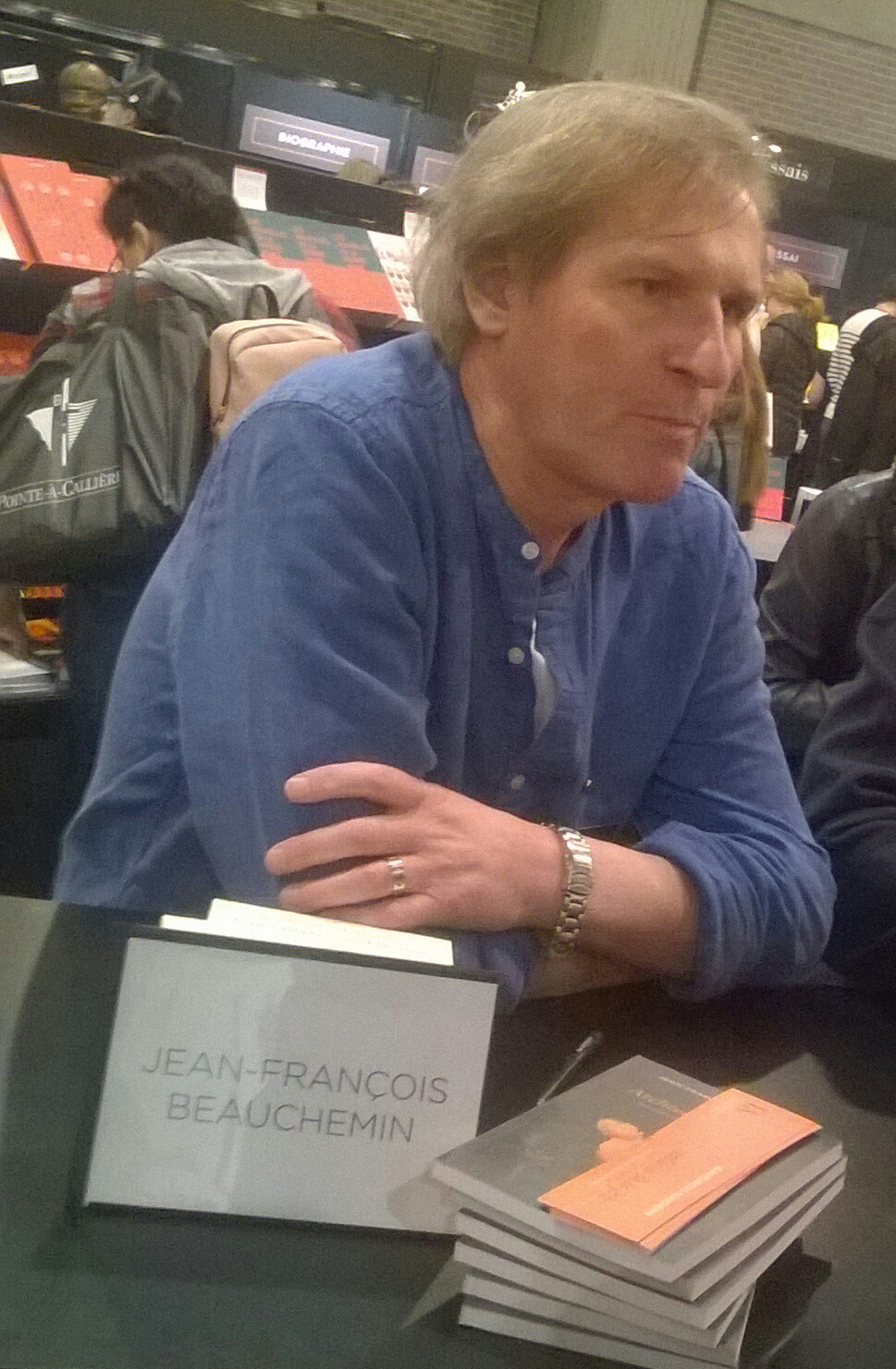
- Born: 1960 (age 65–66); Drummondville, Quebec
- Occupation: writer
- Writing career
- Period: 1990s-present
- Notable works: Le Jour des corneilles, La fabrication de l'aube, Ceci est mon corps
- Notable awards: Prix Jean-Hamelin, Prix des libraires du Québec

Jean-François Beauchemin (born 1960 in Drummondville, Quebec) is a Canadian writer from Quebec. He is most noted as a two-time nominee for the Governor General's Award for French-language fiction, receiving nominations at the 2008 Governor General's Awards for Ceci est mon corps and at the 2009 Governor General's Awards for Cette année s'envole ma jeunesse.

A graduate of the Université de Montréal, Beauchemin worked as a host and producer for Société Radio-Canada for many years. He published his first novel, Comme enfant je suis cuit, in 1998, and first attracted wider attention when his 2004 novel Le Jour des corneilles won the Prix Jean-Hamelin. However, around this time he suffered a serious illness which nearly killed him; he subsequently left Radio-Canada to recover and devote himself to full-time writing. La fabrication de l'aube, a philosophical novel about a man confronting his mortality, was published in 2006, and won the Prix des libraires du Québec in 2007.

La fabrication de l'aube was selected for the 2009 edition of Le Combat des livres, in which it was defended by actor Emmanuel Bilodeau. Le Jour des corneilles was adapted as an animated film, which was released in 2012.

== Works ==
=== Fiction ===
- Comme enfant je suis cuit, 1998
- Garage Molinari, 1999
- Les Choses terrestres, 2001
- Le Petit Pont de la Louve, 2002
- Le Jour des corneilles, 2004
- Turkana Boy, 2004
- La Fabrication de l'aube, 2006
- Ceci est mon corps, 2008
- Cette année s'envole ma jeunesse, 2009
- Le Temps qui m'est donné, 2010
- Le Hasard et la Volonté, 2012
- Quelques pas dans l'éternité, 2013
- Une enfance mal fermée, 2014
- Objets trouvés dans la mémoire, 2015
- Le projet Éternité, 2016
- J'attends Joséphine, 2017
- Archives de la joie, 2018
- Sale temps pour les émotifs, 2019

=== Children's literature ===
- Mon père est une chaise, 2001

=== Poetry ===
- Voici nos pas sur la terre, 2006
- Quand les pierres se mirent à rêver, 2007
- Fardeaux de mésanges, 2013

=== Non-fiction ===
- Ici Radio-Canada: 50 ans de télévision française, 2002
