= Edem Awumey =

Togolese-Canadian writer

- Born: 1975 (age 50–51); Lomé, Togo
- Occupation: novelist
- Writing career
- Period: 2000s–present
- Notable works: Port-Mélo, Les Pieds sales

Edem Awumey (born 1975 in Lomé, Togo) is a Togolese-Canadian writer. Born in Togo and educated in France, he has lived in Gatineau, Quebec since 2005.

His debut novel Port-Mélo won the Grand prix littéraire d'Afrique noire in 2006, and his second novel Les Pied sales was a shortlisted nominee for the Prix Goncourt in 2009. Dirty Feet, an English translation of Les Pieds sales by Lazer Lederhendler, was also a shortlisted nominee for the 2011 Governor General's Award for French to English translation and the 2012 ReLit Award for fiction.

His third novel, Rose déluge, was published in 2011, and his fourth, Explication de la nuit, was published in 2013. He is also the author of Tierno Monénembo: le roman de l'exil, a critical study of the work of Tierno Monénembo.

At the 2018 Governor General's Awards, Phyllis Aronoff and Howard Scott won the Governor General's Award for French to English translation for Descent Into Night, the English translation of Explication de la nuit.

His most recent novel, Mina parmi les ombres, was published in fall 2018. It was shortlisted for the Governor General's Award for French-language fiction at the 2019 Governor General's Awards.
