= Jean-Jacques Simard =

- Born: 1945 (age 79–80); Canada
- Occupation: Writer
- Known for: sociologist and professor

Jean-Jacques Simard (born 1945) is a Québécois professor and sociologist.

He has been professor of sociology at Université Laval since 1976.

He began the first project into modern autonomous Inuit government in Canada. A critic of hydroelectric development in Baie-James, he left public function to become a counsellor for Inuit dissidents in the famous James Bay and Northern Quebec Agreement.

The Bélanger-Campeau Commission called him to give evidence in the aboriginal question.

From 1988 to 1989, he edited Recherches sociographiques, a journal published by the Département de sociologie, Faculté des sciences sociales of Université Laval, Quebec City.

== Works ==
- La longue marche des technocrates, 1979.. sur le site Les Classiques des sciences sociales.
- Tendances nordiques – Les changements sociaux, 1970–1990, chez les Cris et Inuits du Québec, 1995
- La Réduction: l’Autochtone inventé et les Amérindiens d’aujourd’hui, 2004

== Honours ==
- 2004 – Governor General's Awards, La Réduction: l’Autochtone inventé et les Amérindiens d’aujourd’hui
