= Shenaaz Nanji =

Canadian writer (born 1954)

- Born: 8 October 1954 (age 71) Mombasa, Kenya
- Occupation: Author
- Genre: Children's and young adult literature

Website
- www.shenaaznanji.com/home

Shenaaz Nanji (born 8 October 1954) is an Indian Canadian children's and young adult author from Calgary, Alberta.

== Writing ==
Nanji holds an M.F.A. in writing for children and young adults from Vermont College.

Nanji's novel Child of Dandelions, about the expulsion of Indians in Uganda, was a shortlisted nominee for the 2008 Governor General's Awards in the English-language children's literature category.

Her other children's books include Indian Tales, An Alien in my House!, Treasures for Lunch, The Old Fisherman of Lamu, Teeny Weeny Penny, Grandma's Heart and Alina in a Pinch.
