= Rima Elkouri =

Canadian journalist and writer

Rima Elkouri is a Canadian journalist and writer. She is most noted for her novel Manam, which was a shortlisted finalist for the Atwood Gibson Writers' Trust Fiction Prize in 2022.

A journalist and columnist for La Presse, she first published Manam in French in 2019. with the English translation by Phyllis Aronoff and Howard Scott following in fall 2021.
