= Howard Scott (translator) =

Canadian literary translator

Howard Scott is a Canadian literary translator. He is most noted as co-winner with Phyllis Aronoff of the Governor General's Award for French to English translation at the 2018 Governor General's Awards for Descent Into Night, their translation of Edem Awumey's novel Explication de la nuit.

They were previously nominated in the same category at the 2009 Governor General's Awards for A Slight Case of Fatigue, their translation of Stéphane Bourguignon's Un peu de fatigue.

They won the Cole Foundation Prize for Translation at the 2001 Quebec Writers' Federation Awards for The Great Peace of Montreal of 1701: French-Native Diplomacy in the Seventeenth Century (Gilles Havard, La Grand Paix de Montréal de 1701: les voies de la diplomatie franco-amérindienne), and were nominated in 2007 for My Name Is Bosnia (Madeleine Gagnon, Je m'appelle Bosnia) and in 2015 for As Always (Madeleine Gagnon, Depuis toujours).

In 2022, their translation of Rima Elkouri's novel Manam was shortlisted for the Atwood Gibson Writers' Trust Fiction Prize.

Scott is a native of Plattsville, Ontario, and was educated at McGill University and Concordia University. He began his career by translating Louky Bersianik's Eugélionne as his master's project at Concordia, for which he won the Governor General's Award for translation at the 1997 Governor General's Awards.
