= Julie Mazzieri =

Canadian novelist and translator (born 1975)

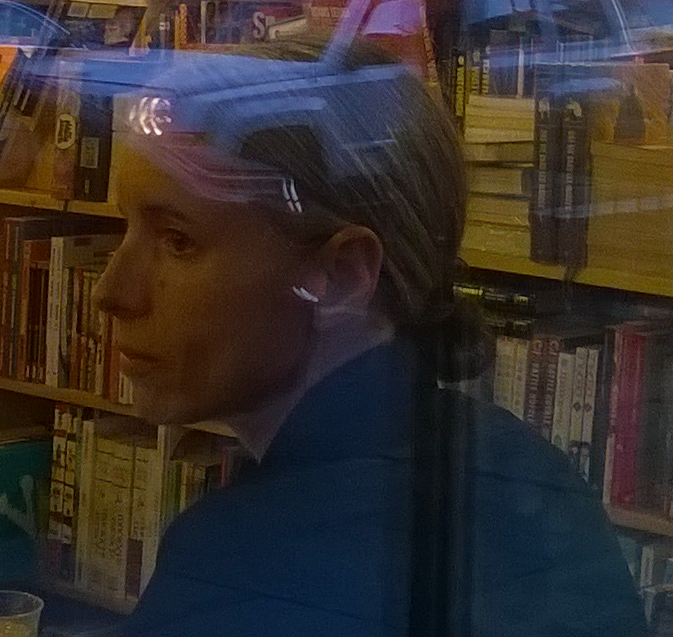
Julie Mazzieri in 2017

Julie Mazzieri (born 1975 in Saint-Paul-de-Chester, Quebec) is a Canadian novelist and translator who currently lives in Corsica. She is most noted for her novel Le discours sur la tombe de l'idiot, which won the Governor General's Award for French-language fiction at the 2009 Governor General's Awards. The novel was also a finalist for the Prix Orange du livre and the Prix littéraire des collégiens.

In 2010, she published a French translation of Gail Scott's novel My Paris.

Mazzieri's second novel, La Bosco, was published in 2017. It was a finalist for the Prix Wepler in France.
