= Judith Cowan =

Canadian academic (1943–2025)

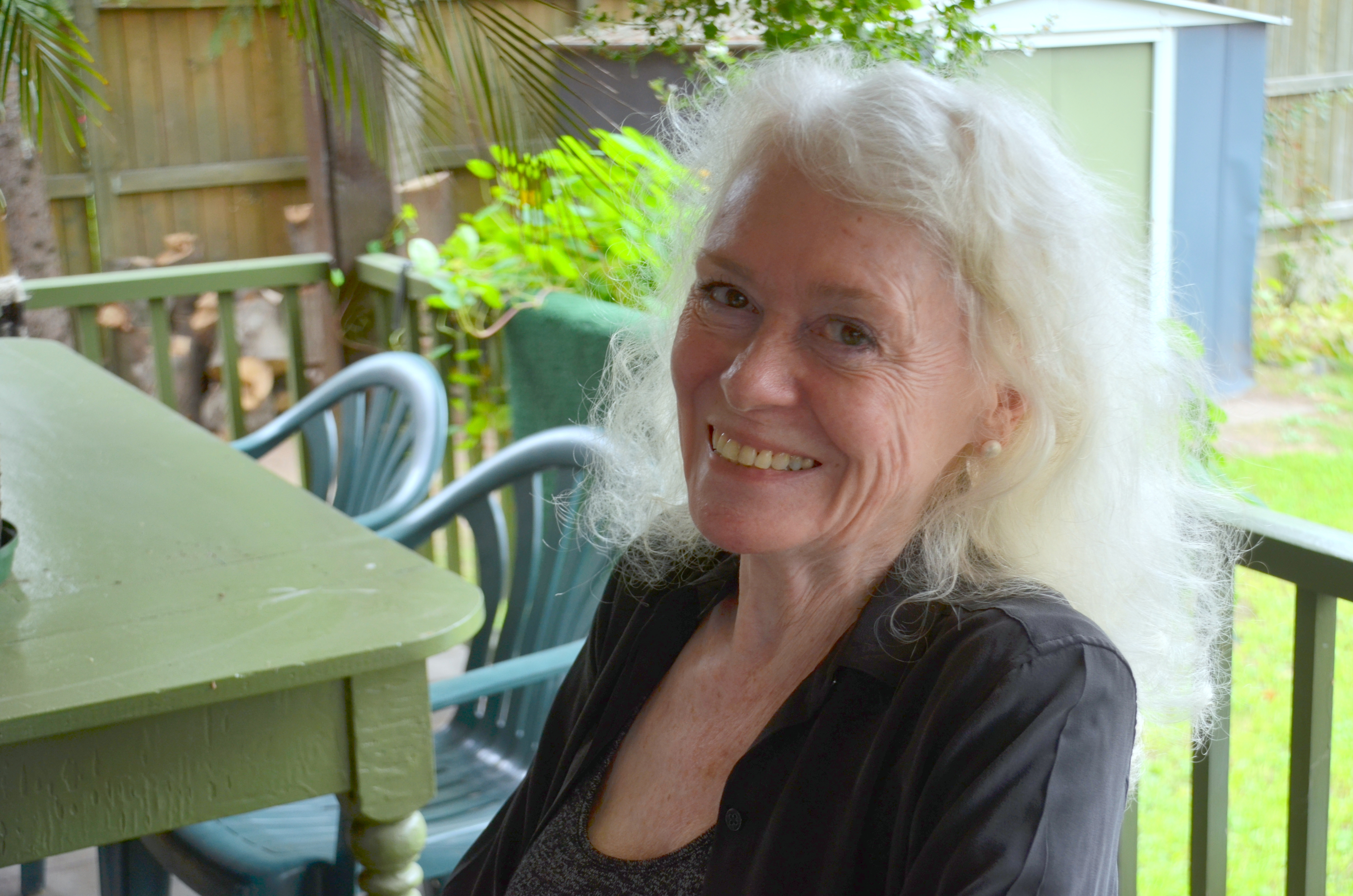
- Cowan c. 2015
- Born: Judith Elaine Cowan; September 21, 1943; Sydney, Nova Scotia, Canada
- Died: January 14, 2025 (aged 81); Trois-Rivières, Quebec, Canada
- Awards: Prix de littérature Gérald-Godin (2000); Prix de littérature Clément-Morin (2003); Governor General's Award (2004)

Judith Elaine Cowan (September 21, 1943 – January 14, 2025) was a Canadian academic, translator, and writer.

Judith Elaine Cowan was born in Sydney, Nova Scotia, and grew up in Toronto. She attended West Hill Collegiate Institute before studying at the University of Toronto, at York University and at the Université de Sherbrooke. She taught English language literature at the Université du Québec à Trois-Rivières.

Cowan has translated poetry written by Quebec authors into English for the magazine Ellipse as well as translating other works by French authors. Her short stories have appeared in literary magazines such as Quarry, Queen's Quarterly, The Malahat Review, The Fiddlehead and The Antigonish Review and, in translation, in the magazines L'Atelier du roman, Liberté and XYZ.

Cowan died in Trois-Rivières, Quebec on January 14, 2025.

== Selected works ==
- Quartz and Mica, translated from Quartz et mica by Yolande Villemaire (1987), finalist for the John Glassco Translation Prize
- This Desert Now, translated from Le désert maintenant by Yves Préfontaine (1993)
- More Than Life Itself, short stories (1997), translated into French as Plus que la vie même (2000), received the Prix de littérature Gérald-Godin
- Gambler's Fallacy, short stories (2001), translated into French as La loi des grands nombres (2003), received the Prix de littérature Clément-Morin
- Mirabel translated from Lignes aériennes by Pierre Nepveu (2004), received the Governor General's Award for French to English translation
- Meridian Line, translated from Origine des méridiens by Paul Bélanger (2011), finalist for the Governor General's Award for Translation
