= Donna Scott =

Canadian business person

Donna Scott is a Canadian business person best known as the founder of the fashion magazine Flare.

Scott retired from Flare and went on to chair the Canada Council for the Arts from 1994 to 1998. She also worked as the executive director of the Ontario Arts Council. She was named an Officer of the Order of Canada in 2000.
