= Marcel Trudel =

Canadian historian, university professor and author (1917–2011)

Marcel Trudel CC GOQ
- Born: May 29, 1917; Saint-Narcisse-de-Champlain, Quebec, Canada
- Died: January 11, 2011 (aged 93); Longueuil, Quebec, Canada
- Occupation: Historian
- Known for: Critical review of the history of New France
- Spouse(s): (1) Anne Chrétien (1942) (2) Micheline D'Allaire (1970)
- Children: 3
- Awards: Order of Canada; National Order of Quebec; Governor General's Literary Award for French Non-Fiction, 1966

Academic background
- Education: Université Laval (doctorate, 1945); Harvard University (post-doctoral studies)

Academic work
- Discipline: Historian
- Sub-discipline: History of New France
- Institutions: Université Laval; Carleton University; University of Ottawa
- Main interests: History of New France
- Notable works: Histoire de la Nouvelle-France (six of seven volumes); Deux siècles d'esclavage au Canada (published in English as Canada's Forgotten Slaves: Two Hundred Years of Bondage)

Marcel Trudel CC GOQ (May 29, 1917 – January 11, 2011) was a Canadian historian, university professor (1947–1982) and author who published more than 40 books on the history of New France. He brought academic rigour to an area that had been marked by nationalistic and religious biases. His work was part of the marked changes to Quebec society during the Quiet Revolution. Trudel's work has been honoured with major awards, including the Governor General's Literary Award for French Non-Fiction in 1966, and a second nomination for the award in 1987.

== Early life and education ==
Marcel Trudel was born in Saint-Narcisse-de-Champlain, Quebec, northeast of Trois-Rivières, the son of Hermyle Trudel and Antoinette Cossette, the ninth of eleven children. Orphaned at the age of five, he was adopted by a local couple in his extended family, Théodore Baril and Mary Trépanier.

He showed great academic progress and spent some months at a seminary at Trois-Rivières, but concluded that the priesthood was not for him. Rather, he had a particular interest in literature and hoped to make his living as a writer. He earned a licence ès lettres (cum laude) in 1941 and a Doctorat ès lettres (magna cum laude) in 1945, both from Université Laval. He then had two years of post-doctoral studies at Harvard University before returning to Laval to teach history.

== Career ==
In 1947, Trudel was the first professor of history in Laval's newly founded Institute of History. He went on to become head of the History department. From 1955 to 1960, he published on many subjects that the Catholic hierarchy controlling the university found scandalous, such as: "Chiniquy" (the first French Catholic priest who became a Presbyterian minister), "The Canadian Catholic Church under the English Military Government, in 1759-1764", and "The Slaves in New France" (most of them being Amerindian and belonging even to the Catholic Church masters). As of 1962, Trudel was also president of the For Laïcité Movement in Quebec City. It was too much: in 1962, under pressure from the Roman Catholic Church, Laval University demoted him from his position as head of the History department.

In 1961, Laval University Press joined with the University of Toronto Press in establishing the Dictionary of Canadian Biography (DCB). Trudel served as the Associate General Editor from 1961 to 1965, working with the General Editor, George Williams Brown, a historian at the University of Toronto. They collaborated both in organizing the over-all project, which has published 15 print volumes and is on-going, and in editing the first volume, which covered the period from 1000 to 1700 and was published in 1966. The DCB is published simultaneously in English and French and has been widely recognized as one of the most important scholarly undertakings in Canada.

Beginning in the 1960s, Marcel Trudel publicly expressed his opposition to Quebec nationalism and the Quebec sovereignty movement, seeing these ideas as a break with the other French-speaking communities in Canada, a fragmentation of these communities on the North American continent and a denial of the historical French and English duality that has shaped Canada. He maintained these opinions throughout his life.

In 1965, Trudel left Laval University and Quebec City to live near Ottawa and taught at Carleton University. The next year, he began teaching at the University of Ottawa after the Ontario government took over the university from the Catholic Oblate Fathers. Having reached age 65 in 1982, he was relieved of his lecturing duties, but he continued to write from his home near Montreal until the year he died; half of his books were published in retirement. In 1993, he also began lecturing at a university to seniors' groups.

Trudel's life's work was the history of New France, in particular his monumental and authoritative Histoire de la Nouvelle-France. Planned to be ten volumes in collaboration with another Quebec historian, Guy Frégault, Trudel wrote six volumes in the series, published between 1963 and 1999. Trudel meticulously reviewed the primary sources and criticized previous accounts in his effort to tell the colony's story without what he viewed as pious or nationalist bias.

== Family and death ==
In 1942, Trudel married Anne Chrétien, with whom he had three children. He married again in 1970, to Micheline D'Allaire, who was also a professor of history at the University of Ottawa.

Trudel died at the age of 93 on January 11, 2011, of generalized cancer. He left his three children, plus six grandchildren and six great-grandchildren.

== Selected Honours ==
- 1964: J.B. Tyrrell Historical Medal by the Royal Society of Canada
- 1966: Governor General's Literary Award for French Non-Fiction
- 1966: Ludger-Duvernay Prize by the Saint-Jean-Baptiste Society
- 1971: Officer of the Order of Canada
- 1984: Sir John A. Macdonald Prize by the Canadian Historical Association / Société historique du Canada
- 1985: Knight of the National Order of Quebec
- 2001: Prix Léon-Gérin
- 2004: Grand Officer of the National Order of Quebec
- 2008: Companion of the Order of Canada

== Works and publications ==
Trudel was a prolific author. He worked primarily in French, but some of his works also appeared in English, via translation.

=== Works in French ===
==== 1946-1949 ====
- 1945: L'influence de Voltaire au Canada, Montréal, Fides
- 1946: Vézine : a novel, Montréal, Fides
- 1948: Collection de cartes anciennes et modernes pour servir à l'étude de l’histoire de l’Amérique et du Canada, Québec, Institut d'histoire et de géographie de l'Université Laval
- 1949: Louis XVI, le Congrès américain et le Canada, 1774-1789, Québec, Éditions du Quartier Latin

==== 1950-1959 ====
- 1950: Lettres du Bas-Canada, Montréal, L'Immaculée-Conception
- 1952: Le Canada et la révolution américaine 1774-1789, Québec, Presses Universitaires Laval
- 1952: Histoire du Canada par les textes (with Guy Frégault and Michel Brunet), Montréal; Paris, Fides
- 1952: Le régime militaire dans le gouvernement des Trois-Rivières, 1760-1764, Trois-Rivières, Éditions du bien public
- 1953: L'Affaire Jumonville, Québec, Presses Universitaires Laval
- 1954: Le Séminaire de Québec sous le régime militaire, 1759-1764, Québec : [s.n.]
- 1955: Chiniquy, Trois-Rivières Éditions du Bien public
- 1956: Champlain, Montréal, Fides, collection « Classiques canadiens », revised edition, 1968
- 1956: Les communautés de femmes sous le régime militaire, 1759-1764, Montréal, Institut d'histoire de l'Amérique française, collection Les études
- 1956: Le régime seigneurial / The Seigneurial Regime, Ottawa, Société historique du Canada / Canadian Historical Association (published bilingually), revised edition, 1971
- 1956-1957: L'Église canadienne sous le Régime militaire, 1759-1764, Montréal, Institut d'histoire de l'Amérique française, collection Les études, Volume I : Les problèmes, 1956; Volume II : Les institutions, 1957

==== 1960-1969 ====
- 1960: L'esclavage au Canada français; histoire et conditions de l'esclavage, Québec, Presses universitaires Laval
- 1960: L'esclavage au Canada français, Montréal, Éditions de l'Horizon (abridged edition)
- 1961: Atlas historique du Canada français des origines à 1867, Québec, Presses de l'Université Laval
- 1963 to 1999: Histoire de la Nouvelle-France, Montréal, Fides :
  - Volume I : Les Vaines Tentatives, 1524-1603, 1963
  - Volume II : Le Comptoir, 1604-1627, 1966 (Winner of Governor General's Literary Award for French Non-Fiction, 1966)
  - Volume III : La seigneurie des Cent-Associés, 1627-1663 :
    - Book I : Les évènements, 1979
    - Book II : La société, 1983 (Winner of Sir John A. Macdonald Prize, 1984)
  - Volume X : Le régime militaire et la disparition de la Nouvelle-France, 1759-1764, Montréal, Fides, 1999
- 1965: Histoire du Canada par les textes (with Guy Frégault and Michel Brunet) : tome 1 : (1534-1854), Montréal, Fides
- 1966: Dictionnaire biographique du Canada. Volume premier, de l'an 1000 à 1700 (Associate General Editor), Québec, Presses de l'Université Laval
- 1968: Jacques Cartier, Montréal, Fides
- 1969: L'histoire du Canada; enquête sur les manuels (with Genevieve Jain), within Studies of the Royal Commission on Bilingualism and Biculturalism, Queen's Printer for Canada, 150 pages

==== 1970-1979 ====
- 1971: Initiation à la Nouvelle-France : histoire et institutions, Montréal, Éditions HRW
- 1972: Le Québec de 1663, Québec, Société historique de Québec
- 1973: Atlas de la Nouvelle-France, Québec, Presses de l'Université Laval
- 1973: La Population du Canada en 1663, Montréal, Fides
- 1973: Le Terrier du Saint-Laurent en 1663, Ottawa, Éditions de l'Université d'Ottawa
- 1974: Les débuts du régime seigneurial au Canada, Montréal, Fides
- 1976: La Révolution américaine : pourquoi la France refuse le Canada, 1775-1783, Sillery, Boréal Express, 292 pages ISBN 978-0-8850-3054-5
- 1976: Montréal : la formation d'une société, 1642-1663, Montréal, Fides
- 1978: La carte de Champlain en 1632 : ses sources et son originalité, [s.l.s.n.]

==== 1980-1989 ====
- 1983: Catalogue des immigrants, 1632-1662, Montréal, Hurtubise HMH, 570 pages ISBN 978-2-8904-5579-5
- Mémoires d'un autre siècle, Montréal, Boréal, 320 pages ISBN 978-2-8905-2207-7 (nominated for the 1987 Governor General's Literary Award, French Non-fiction)

==== 1990-1993 ====
- 1994: Dictionnaire des esclaves et de leurs propriétaires au Canada français, LaSalle, Hurtubise HMH, collection Cahiers du Québec : Histoire, 1994, 520 pages ISBN 978-2-8904-5833-8
- 1995: La Population du Canada en 1666 : recensement reconstitué, Sillery, Septentrion
- 1995: La Présence des noirs dans la société québécoise d'hier et d’aujourd'hui, Montréal Ministère des affaires internationales, de l'immigration et des communautés culturelles
- 1997: La Seigneurie de la Compagnie des Indes occidentales, 1663-1674, Saint-Laurent, Fides
- 1998: Le Terrier du Saint-Laurent en 1674, Montréal, Éditions du Méridien
- 1999: Les écolières des Ursulines de Québec, 1639-1686 : Amérindiennes et Canadiennes, Montréal, Hurtubise-HMH, collection Cahiers du Québec : Histoire, 440 pages ISBN 978-2-8942-8355-4

==== 2000-2005 ====
- 2001: Chiniquy : prêtre catholique, ministre presbytérien, Montréal, Lidec
- 2001: Saint-Narcisse-de-Champlain : au pays de la Batiscan, Saint-Narcisse, Mairie de Saint-Narcisse
- 2001-2003: Les mythes et la réalité de notre histoire du Québec, Saint-Laurent, Éditions du Club Québec loisirs
- 2001-2010: Mythes et réalités dans l'histoire du Québec, Montréal, Hurtubise HMH, collection Cahiers du Québec : Histoire :
  - Book I : 2001, 312 p., 14,61 x 22,86 cm ISBN 978-2-8942-8527-5
  - Book II : 2004, 264 p. ISBN 978-2-8942-8758-3
  - Book III : 2006, 208 p. ISBN 978-2-8942-8942-6
  - Book IV : 2009, 192 p. ISBN 978-2-8964-7177-5
  - Book V : 2010, 200 p. ISBN 978-2-8964-7323-6
- 2003: La Nouvelle-France par les textes : les cadres de vie, Montréal, Hurtubise HMH, collection Cahiers du Québec : Histoire, 440 pages ISBN 978-2-8942-8633-3
- 2004: Deux siècles d'esclavage au Québec, Montréal, Hurtubise HMH, 408 pages ISBN 978-2-8942-8742-2; updated 2009, by Micheline D'Allaire, including Dictionnaire des esclaves on CD-ROM, Bibliothèque québécoise
- 2005: Connaître pour le plaisir de connaître : entretien avec l'historien Marcel Trudel sur la science historique et le métier d'historien au Québec (with Mathieu d'Avignon), Québec, Presses de l'Université Laval ISBN 2763782299, 9782763782294

=== Works in English ===
- 1954: "The Jumonville Affair", Pennsylvania History Quarterly Journal (1953), vol. 21, no. 4, 34 pages (originally published in French)
- 1956: The Seigneurial Regime / Le régime seigneurial, Ottawa, Canadian Historical Association / Société historique du Canada (published bilingually), revised edition, 1971
- 1967: Canada: Unity and Diversity (with P.G. Cornell, J. Hamelin, F. Ouellet), Holt, Rinehart and Winston, Toronto, 530 pages.
- 1968: Introduction to New France, Holt, Rinehart and Winston of Canada, 300 pages (condensed from the first volumes of Histoire de la Nouvelle-France)
- 1970: Canadian History Textbooks - A Comparative Study (with Genevieve Jain), within Studies of the Royal Commission on Bilingualism and Biculturalism, Queen's Printer for Canada, 150 pages
- 1973: The Beginnings of New France 1524-1663 (translated by Patricia Claxton), McClelland & Stewart, Toronto, 324 pages, ISBN 0-7710-8610-5 (Volume II of the Canadian Centenary Series)
- 2002: Memoirs of a Less Travelled Road: A Historian's Life, translation by Jane Brierley of his autobiography Mémoire d'un autre siècle, Véhicule Press, 248 pages ISBN 1-55065-156-0 (winner of the 2003 Governor General's Awards for French-to-English translation)
- 2013: Canada's Forgotten Slaves: Two Hundred Years of Bondage, translation by George Tombs of Deux siècles d'esclavage au Québec, Véhicule Press, ISBN 978-1550653274

== See also ==
Marcel Trudel - French language article on Wikipédia français
