= Evan Jones (Canadian poet) =

Canadian poet and critic (born 1973)

Evan Jones (born 1973 in Weston, York, Ontario) is a Canadian poet and critic. He completed his secondary education at Lawrence Park Collegiate Institute in Toronto. In 2003, he was a finalist for the Governor General's Literary Awards for Poetry. He is currently a creative writing teacher at the University of Bolton, where he resides full-time.

== Works ==
=== Poetry ===
- Nothing Fell Today But Rain. Fitzhenry & Whiteside. 2003.
- Paralogues. Carcanet Press. 2012.
- The Drawing, the Ship, the Afternoon. Anstruther Press. 2018.
- Later Emperors. Carcanet Press. 2020.

=== Anthologies ===
- Introductions: Poets Present Poets. Fitzhenry & Whiteside. 2001.
- Modern Canadian Poets: an anthology. Carcanet Press. 2010. (with Todd Swift)
- Earth and Heaven: An Anthology of Myth Poetry. Fitzhenry & Whiteside. 2015. (with Amanda Jernigan)

== Awards ==
- 2003 Finalist, Governor General's Award for Poetry

== Reviews ==
The words ‘exciting’ and ‘necessary’ are too often bandied about when a new(-ish) writer surfaces, but this book is both of these things. Jones reintroduces surrealism back into the mainstream of British poetry, but he also does something new. He shows that surrealism can deal with identity in a way which is contemporary and responsive to the internationalised lives which are lead {sic} in the twenty-first century.

Paralogues is a remarkable second collection: other Canadian poets use Europe as a kind of arena for their lyric experiments - Don Coles’ Sweden, or the classical world as re-interpreted by Anne Carson or Norm Sibum – but Jones’s poems are much more tangled and materially dense than the work of his older compatriots. .
