= Michel Nadeau =

Canadian administrator and journalist (1946–2021)

- Born: 8 November 1946; Quebec, Canada
- Died: 19 October 2021 (aged 73–74)
- Occupations: Administrator; Journalist
- Spouse: Lydie Olga Ntap (m. 2000-2021)
- Children: Jessica Manga, Karen Manga, Christian Zidouemba, Maeva Nadeau

Michel Nadeau (8 November 1946 – 19 October 2021) was a Canadian administrator and journalist. He served as Director-General of the Institute for Governance of Private and Public Organizations.

== Biography ==
From 1974 to 1984, Nadeau was a columnist and financial editor for Le Devoir. He then held several senior management positions at the Caisse de dépôt et placement du Québec for 18 years. He was chairman of CDP Capital, which held over $125 billion in assets. For several years, he sat on the corporate governance committee of the Pension Investment Association of Canada. He served on the boards of directors of several corporations and non-profit organizations, such as the Montreal World Film Festival.

Michel Nadeau died on 19 October 2021 at the age of 75.
