= Institute for Governance of Private and Public Organizations =

Canadian think tank

Established in September 2005, the Institute for Governance of Private and Public Organizations (IGOPP) is a Canadian think tank and joint initiative of HEC Montréal and Concordia University (The John Molson School of Business) and the Jarislowsky Foundation. The Institute is committed to promoting strong corporate governance practices among organizations in Quebec and the rest of Canada.

== Activity ==
Its operations focus primarily on key management activities, namely defining the corporate mission, evaluating strategic management and financial performance, recruiting and compensating officers and managing risk. It achieves this through:

- Policy papers: The Institute supports academic research, takes part in public debates on governance issues, reinforces governance related skills;
- Research: the aim is to stimulate debate on key issues of governance by providing rigorous research work;
- Training: IGOPP organizes conferences and training seminars
- Dissemination of information: The Institute promotes partnership and knowledge transfer.

== Books ==
Yvan Allaire and IGOPP's books deal with the financial market, mining royalties, executive compensation, "good governance" in the public or private sector, takeovers of listed companies, regulation of financial markets, Davos, the presence of women on boards and many other themes relevant to governance. These books are constantly looking to provide a measured opinion, sensitive to others', by formulating policy proposals that respect the rights of the parties. Their authors' are concerned about the perverse and unexpected effects of good intentions.

- On becoming an activist board... In the age of activist shareholders
- A Capitalism of Owners : How Financial Markets Destroy Companies and Societies and What to Do About It
- Black Markets and Business Blues : The Man-Made Crisis of 2007-2009 and the Road to a New Capitalism. Silver medal, Category : Current Events I (Political/Economic/Legal/Media) of the 2010 Independent Publisher Book Awards.
- Beyond Monks and Minow: From Fiduciary to Value Creating Governance

== Members of the board of directors ==
Chaired by Dr. Yvan Allaire, the board of directors of the institute is made up of 15 individuals from various fields: senior executives of large and small businesses, institutional investors, heads of public-sector organizations, university researchers and regulatory experts: Mary-Ann Bell, Isabelle Courville, Hélène Desmarais, Paule Doré, Robert Greenhill, Stephen Jarislowsky, Michel Magnan, Claudine Mangen, Andrew T. Molson, Louis Morisset, Michel Nadeau, Robert Parizeau, Guylaine Saucier and Sebastian Van Berkom.
