= Nigel Spencer =

Writer, translator, and professor of English

Nigel Spencer is a writer, translator, and professor of English living in Montreal, Quebec, Canada. He has thrice received the Canadian Governor General's Literary Award for translation, in 2002, 2007, and 2012. He was also awarded a 'Proclamation of Recognition' by President Lansana Conté of the Republic of Guinea.

== Education ==
He was born in postwar England to a Holocaust survivor and a Blitz survivor, then raised in London and Montreal, Canada. He received a B.A. (Honours in English) from McGill University and an M.A. in English from the University of Toronto, as well as pursuing doctoral studies in drama at the University of Toronto). He also took courses in teacher training at Concordia University and the Université de Sherbrooke. He received a McGill University Entrance Scholarship, a Canada Council Graduate Fellowship, a University College (Toronto) Teaching Fellowship, and a Residency at Banff International Literary Translation Centre.

== Career ==
As Advisor to the Minister of Education of the Republic of Guinea, he was responsible for researching and re-instituting the teaching of English at the high school and university levels from 1985 to 1987. He was given a Proclamation of Recognition by President Lansana Conté (Republic of Guinea, West Africa) in 1987.

Most of his career has been spent as a professor of English including: the State University of New York at Plattsburgh 2005; Champlain Regional College 1974–2006 (Co-ordinator of the first-year programme 1976–78, 1988–89). Université de Sherbrooke (first known bilingual Comparative Canadian Dramaturgy course) 1976; Teaching Fellow, University College, University of Toronto 1968–71; Since 1997, he has worked increasingly as a translator of stories, poems, plays, songs and journalism:

- Thunder and Light (novel) by Marie-Claire Blais (winner of Governor General's Literary Award for Translation, 2002)
- Augustino and the Choir of Destruction (novel) by Marie-Claire Blais (winner of Governor General's Literary Award for Translation, 2007)
- Mai at the Predators’ Ball (novel) by Marie-Claire Blais (winner of Governor General's Literary Award for Translation, 2012: Finalist - Cole Prize, 2013)
- Wintersleep (plays), The Exile and the Sacred Travellers (stories),"Rebecca: Born in the Maëlstrom" (novel-nominated for the Dublin Impac Award-2011), "Nothing for You Here, Young Man" (novel), and "Collected Plays" by Marie-Claire Blais
- "Tightrope" & "Haunted Childhoods" (poems, stories and songs) by Canadian Poet Laureate Pauline Michel
- "Feet of the Angels" & "Darwin in a Day" (plays) by Évelyne de la Chenelière
- "Freeze-frame" (stories) by Lise Gauvin
- "Evolution: The View From the Cottage" by Jean-Pierre Rogel (Runner-up, Green Books Award-2011)
- "Elvis & Dolores" (play) by André Pronovost.
- "Is This Who We Are? Fourteen Questions about Québec Alain Dubuc
- "The Kashmir Trap Mario Bolduc
- "Who Are You and Why Are You Here? Tales of International Co-operation Jacques Claessens
- "A Twilight Celebration" Marie-Claire Blais
- He has also translated for Time Magazine-Canada.

He has written the subtitles for numerous films including "A Season in the Life of Emmanuel", "Raoul Wallenberg:The Angel of Budapest", "Illuminations: Marie-Claire Blais" (in which he also appears), various documentaries for Bravo! Channel, The Other Side of Mount Royal (with script collaboration), and educational films (with accompanying material).

He has appeared as an actor at the University of Toronto, the St. Lawrence Centre, the Old Firehall and other venues in Toronto. He has performed with the Touring Players Foundation (in both French and English), the Lindsay Festival, the Piggery in North Hatley, the Lennoxville Players and the Pointe-Saint-Charles Community Theatre.

A selection of Spencer's poems, titled After-Images, was published in "Rampike Magazine" in 1998.

He has also been a journalist, a presenter at the Governor General's Lit. Awards, a jury member and chairman for various literary prizes, an organizer and speaker at numerous conferences and seminars, a teachers' union president, a director, plus co-founder of a theatre company and a literary magazine.

He is currently translator for the Montreal Symphony Orchestra.

== Timeline of career ==
- 1962-3: Recipient, McGill Entrance Scholarship
- 1966: McGill University B.A.(Hons.)
- 1967: University of Toronto M.A.
- 1968–70: University of Toronto
- 1968–71: Canada Council Fellowship
- 1968–71: University College (Toronto) Teaching Fellowship
- 1974–2006: Champlain Regional College, Lennoxville, Quebec
- 1976–78: 1st-year Co-ordinator, English Department, Champlain College
- 1976: Université de Sherbrooke
- 1981–3; Président of the Syndicat des enseignants du College Champlain de Lennoxville
- 1985–87: Advisor to the Minister of Education, Republic of Guinea
- 1988–89: 1st-year Co-ordinator, English Department, Champlain College
- 1989: Concordia University (Quebec)
- 1993-5: Université de Sherbrooke
- 2000-4: Provincial Co-ordinating C'ttee for the Teaching of English (Québec College network)
- 2002: Governor General's Literary Award
- 2005: State University of New York (Plattsburgh)
- 2007: Governor General's Literary Award
- 2012: Governor General's Literary Award
- 1972 to date: Journalist
- 1967–85: Actor & director
- 2011 to date: translator for the Montreal Symphony Orchestra,

Évelyne de la Chenelière, Marie-Claire Blais, Alain Dubuc, Mario Bolduc, Time Magazine, Jacques Claessens, Pauline Michel, Jean-Pierre Rogel.
