= Lazer Lederhendler =

Canadian literary translator and academic

Lazer Lederhendler is a Canadian literary translator and academic.

A multiple nominee for the Governor General's Award for French to English translation, he won the award in 2008 for his translation of Nicolas Dickner's novel Nikolski. He has also been nominated for his translations of works by Claire Dé (The Sparrow Has Cut the Day in Half), Pierre Tourangeau (Larry Volt), Edem Awumey (Dirty Feet), Gaétan Soucy (The Immaculate Conception) and Christophe Bernard (The Hollow Beast).

His translation of The Immaculate Conception was also a nominee for the 2006 Scotiabank Giller Prize, and won the French-to-English Translation Prize from the Quebec Writers' Federation Awards. His translation of The Party Wall by Catherine Leroux won the 2016 Governor General's Literary Award and was shortlisted for the 2016 Scotiabank Giller Prize.

Lederhendler teaches English and film at the Collège international des Marcellines in Montreal, Quebec. He went to a Bundist camp, Camp Hemshekh.
