= Jane Brierley =

Canadian translator

Jane Brierley (born 1935) is a Canadian translator, translating from French to English.

She received a B.A. from Bishop's University in 1956. During the early 1960s, while her husband was completing a degree at the University of Paris, Brierley moved to Paris where she worked at an ad agency. On her return to Quebec, she earned a M.A. from McGill University in 1982 based on translating works by Philippe-Joseph Aubert de Gaspé into English. Brierley also worked for the Montreal bureau of The Globe and Mail as an editorial translator. She has served as president of the Literary Translators' Association of Canada.

Brierley has translated books on philosophy, history and biography, children's literature and science fiction. She has won the Governor General's Award for French to English translation twice as well as appearing on the short list several more times.

== Selected works ==
- White Desert (1986), translated from Le Désert blanc by Jean Éthier-Blais, received the Félix-Antoine Savard Award from the translation centre of Columbia University
- Yellow-Wolf & Other Tales of the Saint Lawrence (1990), translation of Aubert de Gaspé, received the Governor General's Award for Translation
- The Maerlande Chronicles (1992), translation of Les chroniques du pays des Mères by Elisabeth Vonarburg, shortlisted for the Philip K. Dick Award
- Canadians of Old (1996), translation of Les Anciens Canadiens by Aubert de Gaspé
- Memoirs of a Less Travelled Road: A Historian's Life (2002), translation of Mémoire d'un autre siècle by Marcel Trudel, received the Governor General's Award for Translation
