= Luise von Flotow =

German-Canadian translator, author and academic

- Occupations: Translator, author and academic

Academic background
- Education: B.A. French and German Literature; M.A. French Literature; Ph.D. French Literature
- Alma mater: University of London; University of Windsor; University of Michigan
- Thesis: Quebec feminist writing: Integrating the avant-garde and the political in the works of Nicole Brossard and France Theoret (1991)

Academic work
- Institutions: University of Ottawa

Luise von Flotow is a German-Canadian translator, author, and academic. She is a Full Professor of Translation Studies at the University of Ottawa (uOttawa).

Flotow's research in translation studies focuses on ideologies in translation. She has published on feminism and translation, gender issues in translation, and government and cultural policies related to translation as well as audiovisual translation. Her academic books include Translation and Gender: Translating in the Era of Feminism, The Routledge Handbook on Translation, Feminism and Gender, Translating Women: Different Voices, and New Horizons, The Third Shore: Women's Fiction from East Central Europe, and Translation Effects: The Making of Contemporary Canadian Culture and Translation. She is a literary translator who has produced translations from French and German to English, such as Christa Wolf's They Divided the Sky (2013), political columns by Ulrike Meinhof in Everybody Talks about the Weather We Don't (2009), Thomas Melle's The World at my Back (2023) and Rinny Gremaud's All the World's a Mall (2023). She has won translation awards from the House of Literature in Greece and other RECIT translation centres, and her work on The Stalinist’s Wife was shortlisted for the Governor General's Award in Literary Translation in 2013.

Flotow is a Founder of Freiburger Frauenstudien (1995) now called Freiburger Zeitschrift für GeschlechterStudien a journal of feminist and gender studies and has been a guest editor for Mutatis Mutandis: Revista Latinoamericana de Traducción and other academic journals.

== Education ==
Flotow completed her B.A. in French and German at the University of London in 1974 and received a Post-Graduate Certificate of Education in 1975. She completed her M.A. in French at the University of Windsor in 1985 and her PhD in French Literature at the University of Michigan (U-M) in 1991. Her doctoral work was funded with a SSHRC Doctoral Fellowship to study Quebec literature from 1986 to 1989 and teaching assistantships at UM.

== Career ==
During her doctoral education, Flotow served as a lecturer in English at Phillips-University (1987–1988), and after completing the doctorate she worked at Freiburg University in Germany (1991–1995) and taught at University of Strasbourg as a maître de conférence from 1993 to 1995. She started her academic career at University of Ottawa as a Postdoctoral Fellow and Lecturer becoming an assistant professor of Translation Studies in 1996, before advancing to the role of associate professor which she held until 2005. During her tenure, she led the Graduate Committee at the School of Translation and Interpretation and assumed the role of Interim Director and then Director at the School of Translation.

Since 1996, Flotow has been a member of the School of Graduate Studies and Research at uOttawa, concurrently serving on the Library Committee for the Faculty of Arts. She also sat on the Faculty of Arts Programs Committee and has held the title of Full Professor of Translation Studies since 2006.

== Scholarship ==
Flotow has focused her research on a broad spectrum within Arts, Literature, and Society, with a particular focus on Feminist Theory, Translation Pedagogy, Language and Translation Policy, Audiovisual Translation, and Translation as Cultural Diplomacy.

Flotow has published on feminist translation studies, offering insights into the political aspects of translation that shape and are shaped by social factors, such as gender identity politics. In her book, Translation and Gender, she delved into the intersection of translation practices and the women's movement, highlighting the influence of feminist ideologies on translation methodologies. Eva C. Karpinski, in her review of the book, noted how "von Flotow manages to unfold a complex argument about the revolutionary impact of gender on translation practice, history, and theory over the last thirty years". In related research, her 1991 essay presented an examination of a translation issue from "La Nef des sorcières", highlighting the context, practices, and theories of feminist translation and its rising significance in Canada. Building on these works, she further emphasized the integration of feminist theory into translation studies in Translating Women advocating for a more nuanced and inclusive approach to revitalize the exploration of gender dynamics in translation.

In the publication Translating Women: Different Voices and New Horizons, co-edited with Farzaneh Farahzad, Flotow explored the intersection of women and translation across diverse global cultures. The book was praised by Hua Tan and Bing Xiong as "a well-organized collection of 13 essays dealing with gender-related issues in the field of translation studies." Further advancing her exploration of these themes, she examined gender complexities in translation studies, focusing on women as pivotal figures in understanding sexual difference and discussed the potential usefulness of intersectionality and metramorphics in this context. In addition, academics Hongzheng Li and Ruojin Wang from Beijing Institute of Technology called her co-edited work, The Routledge Handbook of Translation, Feminism, and Gender, a "well-structured handbook that provides a comprehensive and full landscape on translation and ethics studies from various perspectives and inspires critical ideas". She then emphasized the need for further research at the intersection of gender studies and audiovisual translation (AVT), underscoring the importance of exploring diverse approaches to gender in dubbing, subtitling, and broadcasting of translated audiovisual content.

Flotow edited The Politics of Translation in the Middle Ages and the Renaissance, alongside Renate Blumenfeld-Kosinski and Daniel Russell, examining the relationship between politics and translation during the Middle Ages and emphasizing how socio-political contexts shape translation practices. In Translating Canada, she collaborated with Reingard M. Nischik to explore the role of translation in projecting Canadian culture abroad, particularly in Germany, highlighting the motivations of translators, editors and funders as well as the reception of Canadian literary works. Expanding on this theme, her book Translation Effects: The Shaping of Modern Canadian Culture, co-edited with Kathy Mezei and Sherry Simon, provides an exploration of translation's impact on various facets of Canadian cultural life, from literature and politics to everyday interactions. Anna Bogic from the Institute of Feminist and Gender Studies praised the book, stating, "The book is driven by the objective to contribute to an alternative history of translation in Canada and to move beyond the well-established institution of official bilingualism."

Flotow's French translations include Naomi Fontaine's Manikanetish (Anansi, 2021), Rinny Gremaud's Le monde en toc (All the World's A Mall, UAlberta Press, 2023), and several works by France Théoret: Une belle éducation (Such a Good Education, Cormorant Press, 2010), La femme du stalinien (The Stalinist’s Wife, Guernica Editions, 2013), and L'hôtel des quatre chemins (Four Roads Hotel, Guernica Editions, 2017). In German translations, she worked on political columns by Ulrike Meinhof in Everyone Talks About the Weather We Don’t (Seven Stories Press, 2008) and did a re-translation of Christa Wolf's Der geteilte Himmel (They Divided the Sky, UOttawa Press, 2013), also translating Thomas Melle's Die Welt im Rücken (The World on Your Back, Biblioasis Canada, 2023).

== Bibliography ==
=== Selected books ===
- Translation and Gender: Translating in the Era of Feminism (1997) ISBN 978-0776604480
- The Politics of Translation in the Middle Ages and the Renaissance (2001) ISBN 978-0776619743
- The Third Shore: Women's Fiction from East Central Europe (2006) ISBN 978-0863223624
- Translating Canada (2007) ISBN 978-0776617855
- Translating Women (2011) ISBN 978-0776607276
- Translation Effects: The Shaping of Modern Canadian Culture (2014) ISBN 978-0773543164
- Translating Women: Different Voices and New Horizons (2016) ISBN 978-1138651562
- The Routledge Handbook of Translation, Feminism and Gender (2020) ISBN 978-1138066946

=== Selected translations ===
- They Divided the Sky by Christa Wolf (1963) ISBN 978-0776620343
- The Man Who Painted Stalin by France Théoret (1989) ISBN 978-0920544839
- Deathly Delights by Anne Dandurand (1991) ISBN 978-1550650228
- Life Is a Caravanserai by Emine Sevgi Özdamar (1992) ISBN 978-1898253341
- Maude by Suzanne Jacob (1997) ISBN 978-1550710496
- Obsessed with Language: A Sociolinguistic History of Quebec by Chantal Bouchard (1999) ISBN 978-1550712933
- Girls Closed In by France Théoret (2005) ISBN 978-1550712063
- Such a Good Education by France Théoret (2006) ISBN 978-1897151488
- Everybody Talks About the Weather We Don't by Ulrike Marie Meinhof (2008) ISBN 978-1609800468
- Manikanetish by Naomi Fontaine (2011) ISBN 978-1487008147
- The Stalinist's Wife by France Théoret (2013) ISBN 978-1550716320
- The World at My Back by Thomas Melle (2016) ISBN 978-1771964517
- The Four Roads Hotel by France Théoret (2017) ISBN 978-1771832106
- All the World's a Mall by Rinny Gremaud (2023) ISBN 978-1772127201

=== Selected articles ===
- Flotow, L. von. (1991). Feminist translation: contexts, practices and theories. TTR: traduction, terminologie, rédaction, 4(2), 69–84.
- Flotow, L. von. (2000). Translation effects: How Beauvoir talks sex in English. Hawthorne, Melanie (ed.), 13–33.
- Flotow, L. von. (2009). Contested gender in translation: Intersectionality and metramorphics. Palimpsestes. Revue de traduction, (22), 245–256.
- Flotow, L. von. (2012). Translating Women: from recent histories and re-translations to «Queerying» translation, and metramorphosis. Quaderns: revista de traducció, 127–139.
- Flotow, L. von. & Hernández, D. E. J. (2018). Gender in audiovisual translation studies: Advocating for gender awareness. In The Routledge handbook of audiovisual translation (pp. 296–311). Routledge.
