= Pierre Nepveu =

French Canadian poet, novelist and essayist

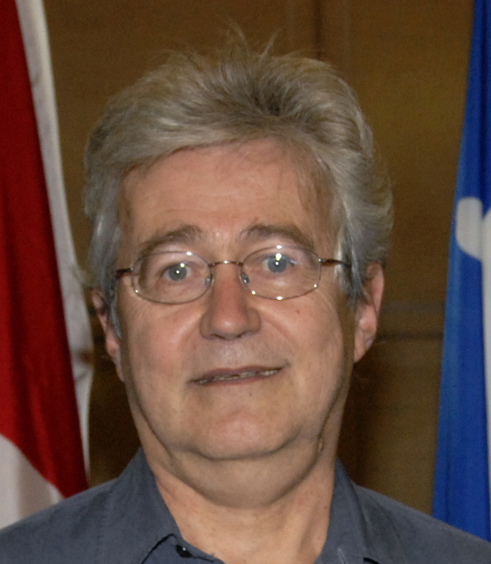
Pierre Nepveu

Pierre Nepveu CM OQ (born 16 September 1946 in Montreal, Quebec) is a French Canadian poet, novelist and essayist. As a scholar, he specializes in modern Quebec poetry, in particular the work of Gaston Miron. He taught at the French Studies Department of Université de Montréal from 1979 until his retirement in 2009.

== Awards and recognition ==
- 1979: non-fiction finalist, Governor General's Awards, Les mots à l'écoute
- 1986: fiction finalist, Governor General's Awards, L'hiver de Mira Christophe
- 1997: poetry winner, Governor General's Awards, Romans-fleuves
- 1998: nonfiction winner, Governor General's Awards, Intérieurs du Nouveau Monde : Essais sur les littératures du Québec et des Amériques
- 2003: poetry winner, Governor General's Awards, Lignes aériennes
- 2005: winner, Prix Athanase-David
- 2011: Member of the Order of Canada
- 2018: Officer of the National Order of Quebec

== Bibliography ==
- 1977: Épisodes (L'Hexagone)
- 1979: Les mots à l'écoute: poésie et silence chez Fernand Ouellette, Gaston Miron et Paul-Marie Lapointe (Presses de l'Université Laval) ISBN 0-7746-6857-1
- 1980–1981: with Laurent Mailhot, La Poésie québécoise, des origines à nos jours, anthology (Presses de l'Université du Québec) ISBN 2-7605-0284-8
  - 1996: reissue (Typo) ISBN 2-89295-006-6
- 1986: L'hiver de Mira Christophe, novel (Boréal) ISBN 2-89052-164-8
- 1986: co-compiler with Laurent Mailhot, La Poésie québécoise: des origines à nos jours (Hexagone) ISBN 2-89295-006-6
- 1992: Des mondes peu habités, novel (Boréal) ISBN 2-89052-489-2
  - 1997: English translation by Judith Weisz Woodsworth, Still lives (Nuage Editions) ISBN 0-921833-54-7
- 1992: with Gilles Marcotte, Montréal imaginaire: ville et littérature (Fides) ISBN 2-7621-1615-5
- 1997: Romans-fleuves (Éditions du Noroît) ISBN 2-89018-382-3
  - 1998: English translation by Donald Winkler, Romans-fleuves (Exile Editions) ISBN 1-55096-232-9
- 1998: Intérieurs du Nouveau Monde: essais sur les littératures du Québec et des Amériques (Boreal) ISBN 2-89052-881-2
- 1999: L'écologie du réel: mort et naissance de la littérature québécoise contemporaine (Boréal) ISBN 2-89052-962-2
- 2002: Lignes aériennes (Éditions du Noroît) ISBN 2-89018-500-1
  - 2004: English translation by Judith Cowan, Mirabel (Signal Editions) ISBN 1-55096-232-9
- 2004: editor with Marie-Andrée Beaudet, Un long chemin: proses, 1953-1996, compilation of works by Gaston Miron (L'Hexagone) ISBN 2-89006-695-9
