= François-Marc Gagnon =

Franco-Canadian art historian and professor (1935–2019)

- Born: June 18, 1935; Paris
- Died: March 28, 2019 (aged 83)
- Citizenship: France, Canada

Academic work
- Discipline: Art History

François-Marc Gagnon CM FRSC was a Canadian art historian and professor at Concordia University in Montreal. He was a Fellow of the Royal Society of Canada and a member of the Order of Canada. Professor Gagnon became famous when a student using an online course which Gagnon developed before his death tried to contact him and realized that he had died in 2019.

He authored three books published by the Art Canada Institute: Paul-Émile Borduas: Life & Work (2014); Louis Nicolas: Life & Work (2017); and Jean Paul Riopelle: Life & Work (2019).
