= Fred A. Reed =

Journalist, author and translator (1939–2024)

- Born: 1939; Los Angeles, California, U.S.
- Died: February 14, 2024 (aged 84–85); Agadir, Morocco
- Occupations: Journalist, translator, author
- Writing career
- Genre: Journalism

Fred A. Reed (1939 – February 14, 2024) was an American journalist, author and translator born in the United States who has published and translated several books. He is a three-time winner of the Governor General's Award for French to English translation, for his translations of works by Thierry Hentsch and Martine Desjardins, and received six further shortlisted nominations.

He became Muslim in 2002, and died in Agadir, Morocco on February 14, 2024, at the age of 84–85. He is buried there.

== Books ==
- Persian postcards: Iran after Khomemi. Talonbooks. 1994. ISBN 0-88922-443-9
- Salonica terminus:Travels into the Balkan Nightmare Talonbooks, 1996. ISBN 0-88922-368-8
- Anatolia junction: A journey into hidden Turkey. Talonbooks. 1999. ISBN 0-88922-426-9
- Massoumeh Ebtekar and Fred A. Reed Takeover in Tehran: the inside story of the 1979 U.S. Embassy capture Talonbooks. 2000. ISBN 0-88922-443-9
- Shattered images: the rise of militant iconoclasm in Syria. Talonbooks. 2003. ISBN 0-88922-485-4
- Jean-Daniel Lafond, and Fred A. Reed Conversations in Tehran Talonbooks, 2006. ISBN 0-88922-550-8

=== Translations ===
- Martine Desjardins, translated from French by Fred A. Reed and David Homel. Fairy Ring Talonbooks. 2001
- Martine Desjardins, translated from French by Fred A. Reed and David Homel. All That Glitters. Talonbooks. 2005.
- Martine Desjardins, translated from French by Fred A. Reed and David Homel. A Covenant of Salt. Talonbooks. 2007.
- Thierry Hentsch, translated from French by Fred A. Reed. Empire of Desire: The Abolition of Time. Talonbooks. 2009.
- Martine Desjardins, translated from French by Fred A. Reed and David Homel. Maleficium. Talonbooks. 2012.
- Pavlos Matesis, translated from Greek by Fred A. Reed. The Daughter: a novel Arcadia Books. 2002.
