= Denis Thériault =

Canadian author, playwright and screenwriter

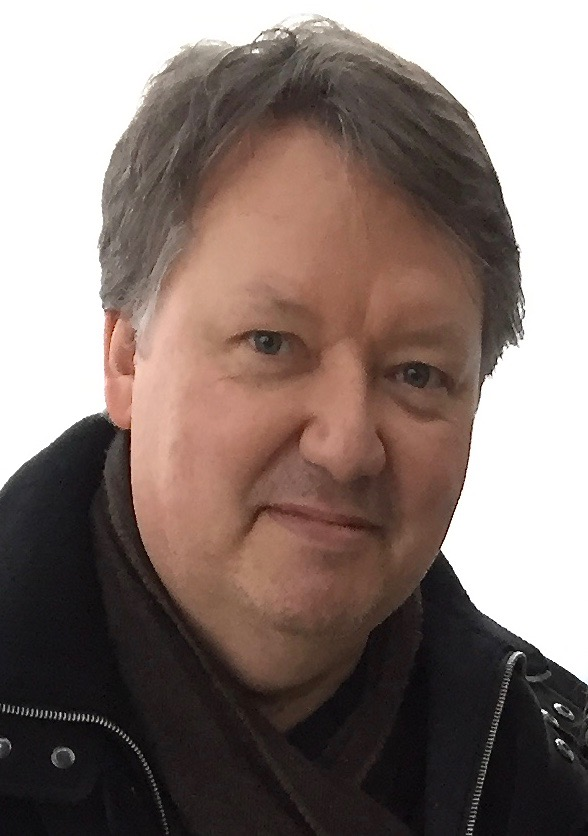
Denis Thériault (2017)

Denis Thériault (born August 24, 1959) is a Canadian author, playwright, and screenwriter of French-Canadian descent.

He graduated in psychology from the University of Ottawa (1981).

Thériault is the author of several plays including La prophétie (1980), Les cloches (1989), and Les Mordus (1990). After winning the Télé-Québec Scenarios Competition twice with Aïrenem (1983), and then Victor le vampire (1984), he began a career as a screenwriter.

Thériault contributed in the writing of several television series including La maison Deschênes (1987–88), Macaroni tout garni (2001 to 2005), Kaboum (2006 to 2010), Les argonautes (2011 to 2013). His film scripts include Frisson des Collines (2011).

Thériault published his first novel in 2001, L'iguane (The Boy Who Belonged to the Sea), which won four literary awards. He has since published Le facteur émotif (Canada-Japan Prize), La fille qui n’existait pas, La fiancée du facteur, and Manucure. His novels are translated into many languages, including Russian and Chinese.

== Honors and awards ==
- 2001 - France-Quebec Literary Prize - L’iguane (English title: The Boy Who Belonged to the Sea)
- 2002 - Anne-Hébert Prize - L’iguane
- 2002 - Odyssée Prize - L’iguane
- 2006 - Canada-Japan Literary Prize - Le facteur émotif (The Peculiar Life of a Lonely Postman)
- 2007 - L’iguane, winner of the Combat des livres de Radio-Canada
- 2014 - The Peculiar Life of a Lonely Postman (English translation of Le facteur émotif) selected by the BBC Radio Book Club
- 2016 - Hervé-Foulon Prize for L’iguane

== Books ==
- L'Iguane, Montréal, (Québec), Canada, Les Éditions XYZ, 2001, 177 p. (ISBN 2-89261-313-2) / English translation : The Boy Who Belonged to the Sea
- Le Facteur émotif, Montréal, (Québec), Canada, Les Éditions XYZ, 2005 116 p. (ISBN 978-2-89261-483-1) / English translation : The Peculiar Life of a Lonely Postman
- La fille qui n’existait pas, Montréal, (Québec), Canada, Les Éditions XYZ, 2012, 224 p. (ISBN 978-2-89261-703-0) /
- La Fiancée du facteur, Montréal, (Québec), Canada, Les Éditions XYZ, 2016, 174 p. (ISBN 978-2-89261-979-9) / English translation : The Postman’s Fiancée
- Manucure, Montréal, (Québec), Canada, Leméac Éditeur, 2019, 247p. (ISBN 978-2-7609-4800-6) / English translation : The Manicurist
- "Le samouraï à l'oeillet rouge", Montréal, (Québec), Canada, Leméac Éditeur, 2022, (ISBN 978-2-7609-4868-6) / English translation: "The Samurai of the Red Carnation", London, U.K., Pushkin Press, 2024.
