= Élise Turcotte =

Canadian writer (born 1957)

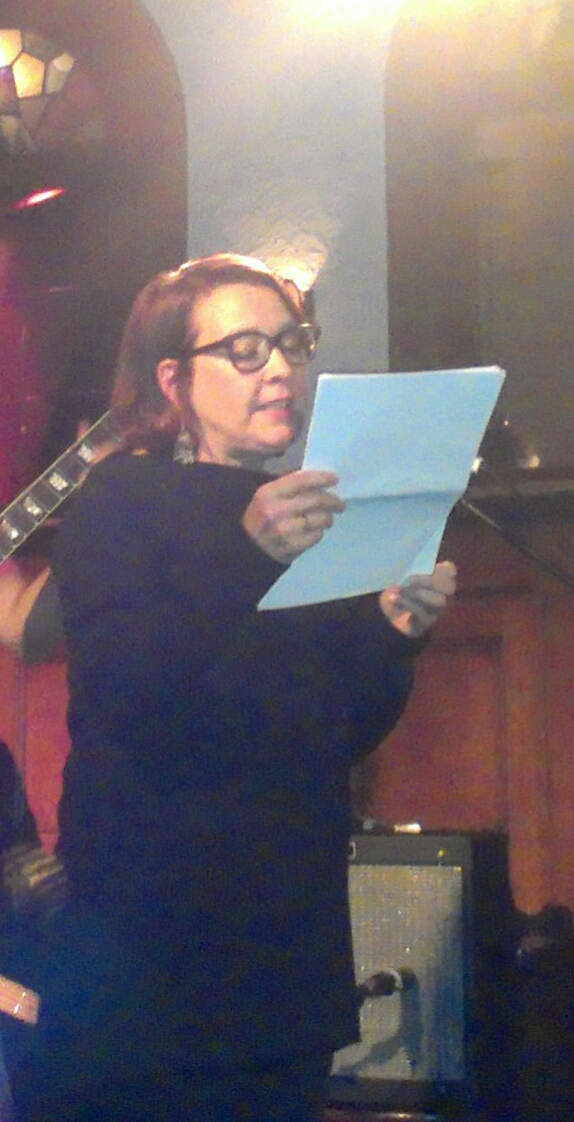
Élise Turcotte

Élise Turcotte (born 26 June 1957) is a Canadian writer. She completed her BA and MA in literary studies at the University of Quebec and later received her doctorate at the Université de Sherbrooke. She now teaches literature at a CEGEP in Montreal, where she currently resides. Her writing has won much praise, and among other things she has won the Grand Prix de Poésie, as well as the 2003 Governor General's Award for her novel La Maison étrangère and the Prix Émile-Nelligan for La voix de Carla in 1987 and for La terre est ici in 1989.

== Works ==
=== Novels ===
- Le Bruit des choses vivantes, Leméac, Montréal / Actes sud, Arles, 1991
- L'Île de la Merci, Leméac, Montréal, 1997
- La Maison étrangère, Leméac, Montréal, 2002
- Pourquoi faire une maison avec ses morts, Leméac, Montréal, 2007
- Guyana, Leméac, Montréal, 2011
- Le Parfum de la tubéreuse, Éditions Alto, Québec, 2015
- L'Apparition du chevreuil, Éditions Alto, Québec, 2019
- Autoportrait d'une autre, Éditions Alto, Québec, 2023

=== Short story collections ===
- Caravane, Bibliothèque québécoise, Montréal, 1994

=== Poetry ===
- Dans le delta de la nuit, Les Écrits des forges, Trois-Rivières, 1982
- Navires de guerre, Les Écrits des forges, Trois-Rivières, 1984
- La Catastrophe, avec Louise Desjardins, NBJ, Montréal, 1985
- La Voix de Carla, VLB, Montréal, 1987
- Sombre Ménagerie, éditions du Noroît, Montréal, 2002
- La terre est ici, VLB, Montréal, 2003
- Piano mélancolique, éditions du Noroît, Montréal, 2005
- Ce qu'elle voit, éditions du Noroît, Montréal, 2010
- La forme du jour, éditions du Noroît, Montréal, 2016
- À mon retour, éditions du Noroît, Montréal, 2022

=== Essays ===
- Autobiographie de l'esprit, La Mèche, Montréal, 2013

=== Children's literature ===
==== Novels ====
- Les Cahiers d'Annette, La courte échelle, Montréal, 1998
- La Leçon d'Annette, La courte échelle, Montréal, 1999
- Annette et le vol de nuit, La courte échelle, Montréal, 2000
- Le Meilleur Ennemi d'Annette, La courte échelle, Montréal, 2006

==== Poetry ====
- Voyages autour de mon lit, La courte échelle, Montréal, 2002
- Rose : derrière le rideau de la folie, La courte échelle, Montréal, 2009

== Awards and honours ==
- 1987: Prix Émile-Nelligan for La voix de Carla
- 1989: Prix Émile-Nelligan for La Terre est ici
- 1992: Prix Louis-Hémon for Le Bruit des choses vivantes
- 2002: Grand Prix du Festival international de la poésie
- 2003: Governor General's Award for French-language fiction for La Maison étrangère
- 2010: Governor General's Award for French-language children's literature for Rose : derrière le rideau de la folie
- 2011: Grand Prix du livre de Montréal for Guyana
- 2021: Prix Ringuet for L'apparition du chevreuil
- 2024: Prix Athanase-David
