= Quebec Writers' Federation Awards =

Canadian literary awards

The Quebec Writers' Federation Awards are a series of Canadian literary awards, presented annually by the Quebec Writers' Federation to the best works of literature in English by writers from Quebec. They were known from 1988 to 1998 as the QSPELL Awards.

== Categories ==
They are currently presented in seven literary categories:

- Paragraphe Hugh MacLennan Prize for Fiction
- Mavis Gallant Prize for Non-Fiction
- A. M. Klein Prize for Poetry
- Concordia University First Book Prize
- QWF Prize for Children's & Young Adult Literature
- Cole Foundation Prize for Translation (French and English, with target language alternating each year)
- 3Macs Carte Blanche Prize for the best work published in the QWF's online literary journal Carte Blanche.

A Community Award is also frequently presented to a person who has played a significant role in building and supporting Quebec's anglophone writing community.

The awards have been presented annually since 1988.

== Winners ==
=== Janet Savage Blachford Prize for Children's and Young Adult Literature ===
The Janet Savage Blachford Prize, established in 2008, is presented annually for children's and young adult books. Picture books with text and books intended for beginner readers are eligible in even-numbered years, whereas books intended for middle grade or young adult readers are eligible in odd-numbered years. The award was established in 2008, was sponsored by sponsored by Janet and John Blachford beginning in 2014, and has been sponsored in the memory of Janet Savage Blachford since 2018.

Janet Savage Blachford Prize for Children's and Young Adult Literature winners
Year	Author	Title	Result	Ref.
2008	Raquel Rivera	Orphan Ahwak	Winner	
2009	Monique Polak	What World Is Left	Winner	
2009	Jane Barclay	Proud as a Peacock, Brave as a Lion	Shortlist	
2009	Marie-Louise Gay	When Stella Was Very, Very Small	Shortlist	
2010	Caryl Cude Mullin	Rough Magic	Winner	
2010	Catherine Austen	Walking Backward	Shortlist	
2010	Monique Polak	The Middle of Everywhere	Shortlist	
2011	Alan Silberberg	Milo	Winner	
2011	Geneviève Coté	Without You	Shortlist	
2011	Alex Epstein	The Circle Cast: The Lost Years of Morgan LeFay	Shortlist	
2012	Catherine Austen	26 Tips for Surviving Grade 6	Winner	
2012	Monique Polak	Pyro	Shortlist	
2012	Lori Weber	Yellow Mini	Shortlist	
2013	Paul Blackwell	Undercurrent	Winner	
2013	Melinda Cochrane	Desperate Freedom	Shortlist	
2013	Anne Renaud	The Extraordinary Life of Anna Swan	Shortlist	
2014	Monique Polak	Hate Mail	Winner	
2014	Marie-Louise Gay	Any Questions?	Shortlist	
2014	Monique Polak	Straight Punch	Shortlist	
2015	No award was presented in 2015			
2016	Bonnie Farmer, illus. by Marie Lafrance	Oscar Lives Next Door	Winner	
2016	Sara O'Leary, illus. by Julie Morstad	This Is Sadie	Shortlist	
2016	Mélanie Watt	Bug in a Vacuum	Shortlist	
2017	Karen Nesbitt	Subject to Change	Winner	
2017	Kate Lavut	Chico	Shortlist	
2017	Lori Weber	Lightning Lou	Shortlist	
2018	Anne Renaud	Mr. Crum's Potato Predicament	Winner	
2018	Bunmi Laditan, illus. by Tom Knight	The Big Bed	Shortlist	
2018	Andrée Poulin, illus. by Félix Girard	That`s Not Hockey	Shortlist	
2019	Raquel Rivera	Yipee's Gold Mountain	Winner	
2019	Louise Carson	In Which	Shortlist	
2019	Monique Polak	I Am a Feminist: Claiming the F-Word in Turbulent Times	Shortlist	
2020	Marie-Louise Gay	The Three Brothers	Winner	
2020	Matthew Forsythe	Pokko and the Drum	Shortlist	
2020	Marie-Louise Gay	Fern and Horn	Shortlist	
2021	Monique Polak	Room for One More	Winner	
2021	Dani Jansen	The Year Shakespeare Ruined My Life	Shortlist	
2021	Nadine Neema	Journal of a Travelling Girl	Shortlist	
2021	Su J. Sokol	Zee	Shortlist	
2022	Matthew Forsythe	Mina	Winner	
2022	Marie-Louise Gay	I'm Not Sydney	Shortlist	
2022	Elise Gravel	Pink, Blue, and You	Shortlist	
2022	Gillian Sze	You Are My Favorite Color	Shortlist	
2023	Edeet Ravel	A Boy Is Not a Ghost	Winner	
2023	Sophie Escabasse	Witches of Brooklyn: S'More Magic	Shortlist	
2023	Jennifer A. Irwin	Captain Skidmark Dances with Destiny	Shortlist	
2024	Marie-Louise Gay	Hopscotch	Winner	
2024	Marie-Louise Gay	Walking Trees	Shortlist	
2024	Etua Snowball and Emma Crossland	The Wolf Pup	Shortlist	
2024	Yayo	SOS Water	Shortlist	
2025	Cassandra Calin	The New Girl	Winner	
2025	Lea Beddia	Outta Here	Shortlist	
2025	Elizabeth Blanchard and Nancy King Schofield	The Bearing	Shortlist	
2025	Monique Polak and Valéry Goulet	Remember This: The Fascinating World of Memory	Shortlist	
2025	Edeet Ravel	Miss Matty	Shortlist	
2026	Sandra Dumais	The Mountain That Wouldn’t Move	Winner	
2026	Isabelle Arseneault	Tom's Wild Ride	Shortlist	
2026	Anne Renaud and Ohara Hale	Mr. Kuroki's Garden	Shortlist	
2026	Todd Stewart	Little Moments in a Big Universe	Shortlist	

=== carte blanche Prize ===
The carte blanche Prize, established in 2008, is awarded annual "in recognition of an outstanding submission to QWF's online literary journal, carte blanche, by a Quebec writer, artist, or translator. Winners receive a cash prize and a unique trophy—'The Lori'—created by Montreal artist Glen LeMesurier."

Carte Blanche Prize winners
Year	Author	Title	Result	Ref.
2008	J. R. Carpenter	"Wyoming Is Haunted"	Winner	
2009	Julie Mahfood	"Changing Winter Tires"	Winner	
2010	Mark Paterson	"Something Important and Delicate"	Winner	
2010	Sarah Gilbert	"Picnic"	Second	
2010	Finn Clarke	"Letters Out"	Third	
2011	Gillian Sze	"Like This Together"	Winner	
2011	Daniel Ha	"A Sunset"	Second	
2011	Rodica Draghincescu, trans. by Howard Scott	"EX(o)ilium"	Third	
2012	Heather Davis	"Aria"	Winner	
2012	Chris Chew	"The Warmth of Steel and Snow"	Second	
2012	Ian McGillis	"William and Robbie"	Third	
2013	Juliet Waters	"Bluefooted"	Winner	
2013	Lindsay Foran	"Finding Snow in Wyoming"	Second	
2013	Caitlin Stall Paquet	"Death in the Midden"	Third	
2014	Elaine Kennedy and Sheryl Curtis (trans.)	"It's Late, Doctor Schweitzer" by Didier Leclair	Winner	
2014	Larissa Andrusyshyn	"Dung Beetle"	Second	
2014	Mark Paterson	"The Dad Was Drinking"	Third	
2015	Deborah Van Slet	"Self-Serve"	Winner	
2015	Cathon	"Old Shit I Still Feel Guilty About"	Second	
2015	Deborah Ostrovsky	"Holy Treasures"	Third	
2016	Lesley Trites	"Rabbits with Red Eyes"	Winner	
2016	Larissa Andrusyshyn	"The Radium Girls"	Second	
2016	André Simoneau	"Bridges We Build"	Third	
2017	Domenico Martinello	"Ferrante in the Cellar: A Vulgar Appreciation"	Winner	
2017	Kasia Juno	"The House On Carbonate"	Second	
2017	Lauren Turner	"Self-Trolling"	Third	
2018	Alisha Dukelow	"loss of (her)self"	Winner	
2018	Oana Avasilichioaei	"Tracking Animal"	Second	
2018	Kaie Kellough	"Bow"	Third	
2019	Eliza Robertson	"Aquanauts"	Winner	
2019	Maria Camila Arias	"On killing a spider"	Second	
2019	Alexei Perry Cox	"My (Your) Home Movie"	Third	
2020	Alexei Perry Cox	"It's a Slow Ride"	Winner	
2020	Kelly Norah Drukker	"Thin"	Second	
2020	Wang Tong	"Emote: A Time Capsule"	Third	
2021	Noa Padawer-Blatt	"Tricks"	Winner	
2021	M-X Marin	"Sickness in Limbo"	Second	
2021	Helen Chau Bradley	"The Queue"	Third	
2022	Meryem Yildiz	"Some Kind of Light"	Winner	
2022	Neil Smith	"The Salad Spinner"	Second	
2022	Simon Brown	"Gardens of Dirty Laundry"	Third	
2023	H. Felix Chau Bradley	"Disorientations"	Winner	
2023	Katia Grubisic	"Relieved"	Shortlist	
2023	Laura Mota-Juang	"The Cows Are Benevolent and Full of Flies"	Shortlist	
2024	Lena Palacios	"Playtime in Carmella's Room"	Winner	
2024	Deborah Ostrovsky	"Zoologies"	Shortlist	
2024	Erin Robinsong	"Bone-Eating Snot Flower"	Shortlist	
2025	Madi Haab	"heart made of bees"	Winner	
2025	Anthony Portulese	"The Stars of Saint-Léonard"	Shortlist	
2025	Nat Kishchuk	"Trulie, Toronto, and the Southwest Swale"	Shortlist	
2026	Silas James	"raccoon-sized or bigger"	Winner	
2026	Katie Grubisic	"Sinking"	Shortlist	
2026	Emma Moss Brender	"Black Lines"	Shortlist	

=== The Cole Foundation Prize for Translation ===
The Cole Foundation Prize for Translation, also known as Le Prix de traduction de la Fondation Cole and established in 1998, is awarded annually to books written by an English-language Quebec writer or an English-language Quebec translator of a book by a French author. English-language Quebec writers are eligible in even-numbered years, whereas English-language Quebec translators are eligible in odd-numbered years.

The Cole Foundation Prize for Translation winners
Year	Translator	Author	Title		Ref.
1998	Hélène Rioux	Yann Martel	Self	Winner	
1999	Sheila Fischman	Marie-Claire Blais	These Festive Nights	Winner	
1999	Patricia Claxton	François Girard	Gabrielle Roy: A Life / Gabrielle Roy: Une Vie	Shortlist	
1999	Donald Winkler	Pierre Nepveu	Romans-fleuves	Shortlist	
2000	Claire Dé	Robert Majzels	Montréal barbare / City of Forgetting	Winner	
2000	Marie Évangeline Arsenault	Carolyn Marie Souaid	Fille au bord de l'eau / Swimming Into the Light	Shortlist	
2000	Ivan Steenhout	Trevor Ferguson	Le Kinkajou /The Kinkajou	Shortlist	
2001	Phyllis Aronoff and Howard Scott	Gilles Havard	The Great Peace of Montreal of 1701: French-Native Diplomacy in the Seventeenth Century / La Grand Paix de Montréal de 1701: les voies de la diplomatie franco-amérindienne	Winner	
2001	Linda Leith	Louis Gauthier	Travels with an Umbrella: An Irish Journey / Voyage en Irelande avec un parapluie	Shortlist	
2001	Fred A. Reed	Aki Shimazaki	Tsubaki	Shortlist	
2002	Pan Bouyoucas	Sheila Arnopoulos	Dans l'ombre de Maggie / Jackrabbit Moon	Winner	
2002	Michel Saint-Germain	Mary Soderstrom	L'autre ennemi / Finding the Enemy	Shortlist	
2002	Ivan Steenhout	Elyse Gasco	Bye-Bye, bébé / Can You Wave Bye Bye, Baby?	Shortlist	
2003	Fred A. Reed and David Homel	Monique Proulx	The Heart is an Involuntary Muscle / Le Coeur est un muscle involuntaire	Winner	
2003	Robert Majzels	France Daigle	A Fine Passage / Un fin passage	Shortlist	
2003	Gail Scott	Michael Delisle	Helen with a Secret / Helen avec un secret	Shortlist	
2004	Lori Saint-Martin and Paul Gagné	Neil Bissoondath	Un baume pour le cœur / Doing the Heart Good	Winner	
2004	Nicole and Émile Martel	Yann Martel	L'histoire de Pi / Life of Pi	Shortlist	
2004	Lori Saint-Martin and Paul Gagné	David Homel	L'analyste / The Speaking Cure	Shortlist	
2005	Fred A. Reed	Thierry Hentsch	Truth or Death: The Quest for Immortality in the Western Narrative Tradition / Raconter et mourir	Winner	
2005	Fred A. Reed and David Homel	Martine Desjardins	ll That Glitters / L'élu du hazard	Shortlist	
2005	Daniel Sloate	Hélène Dorion	No End to the World / Sans bord, sans bout du monde	Shortlist	
2006	Lori Saint-Martin and Paul Gagné	Neil Bissoondath	La Clameur des ténèbres / The Unyielding Clamour of the Night	Winner	
2006	Paule Champoux	Louisa Blair	Les Anglos: La face cachée de Québec, Tome 1, 1608–1850 / The Anglos: The Hidden Face of Quebec City (Volume 1)	Shortlist	
2006	Dominique Fortier	Mark Abley	Parlez-vous Boro? /Spoken Here	Shortlist	
2007	Lazer Lederhendler	Gaétan Soucy	The Immaculate Conception / L'immaculée conception	Winner	
2007	Phyllis Aronoff and Howard Scott	Madeleine Gagnon	My Name Is Bosnia / Je m'appelle Bosnia	Shortlist	
2007	Robert Majzels and Erín Moure	Nicole Brossard	Notebook of Roses and Civilization / Cahier de roses & de civilisation	Shortlist	
2008	Lori Saint-Martin and Paul Gagné	Neil Smith	Big Bang / Bang Crunch	Winner	
2008	Hélène Rioux	Jeffrey Moore	Les artistes de la mémoire / The Memory Artists	Shortlist	
2008	Sophie Voillot	Rawi Hage	Parfum de poussière / De Niro's Game	Shortlist	
2009	Lazer Lederhendler	Nicolas Dickner	Nikolski	Winner	
2009	Susanne de Lotbinière-Harwood	Nicole Brossard	Fences in Breathing / La Capture du sombre	Shortlist	
2009	David Homel and Fred A. Reed	Monique Proulx	Wildlives / Champagne	Shortlist	
2010	Paule Champoux	David Mendel	Québec, ville du patrimoine mondial / Quebec, World Heritage City	Winner	
2010	Hélène Rioux	Taras Grescoe	Notre Mer Nourricière / Bottomfeeder	Shortlist	
2010	Michelle Tisseyre	Byron Rempel	Sans limites: la vie exceptionelle des jumelles Rhona et Rhoda Wurtele, olympiennes et pionnières du ski au Canada / No Limits: The Amazing Life Story of Rhona and Rhoda Wurtele–Canada's Olympian Skiing Pioneers	Shortlist	
2011	Lazer Lederhendler	Nicolas Dickner	Apocalypse for Beginners / Tarmac	Winner	
2011	Judith Cowan	Paul Bélanger	Meridian Line / Origine des méridiens	Shortlist	
2011	Donald Winkler	Georges Leroux	Partita for Glenn Gould / Partita pour Glenn Gould	Shortlist	
2012	Éric Fontaine	Doug Harris	T'es con, point /YOU Comma Idiot	Winner	
2012	Marie Frankland	David Solway	Passage de Franklin / Franklin's Passage	Shortlist	
2012	Lori Saint-Martin and Paul Gagné	Colin McAdam	Fall	Shortlist	
2013	Donald Winkler	Pierre Nepveu	The Major Verbs / Les Verbes majeurs	Winner	
2013	Linda Gaboriau	Lise Tremblay	Judith's Sister / La Soeur de Judith	Shortlist	
2013	Nigel Spencer	Marie-Claire Blais	Mai at the Predators' Ball / Mai au bal des prédateurs	Shortlist	
2014	No award was presented in 2014				
2015	Debbie Blythe	Laure Marchand and Guillaume Perrier	Turkey and the Armenian Ghost: On the Trail of the Genocide / La Turquie et le fantôme arménien: sur les traces du genocide	Winner	
2015	Phyllis Aronoff and Howard Scott	Madeleine Gagnon	As Always / Depuis Toujours	Shortlist	
2015	Sheila Fischman	Kim Thúy	Mãn	Shortlist	
2016	Lori Saint-Martin and Paul Gagné	Mordecai Richler	Solomon Gursky / Solomon Gursky Was Here	Winner	
2016	Daniel Canty	Erín Moure	Petits Théâtres / Little Theatres	Shortlist	
2016	Lori Saint-Martin and Paul Gagné	Mordecai Richler	Joshua / Joshua Then and Now	Shortlist	
2017	Peter Feldstein	Jean-Marie Fecteau	The Pauper's Freedom: Crime and Poverty in Nineteenth-Century Quebec / La liberté pauvre	Winner	
2017	Karen Ocana	Louise Dupre	Rooms / Chambres	Shortlist	
2017	Claire Holden Rothman	David Bouchet	Sun of a Distant Land / Soleil	Shortlist	
2017	Donald Winkler	Josephine Bacon	A Tea in the Tundra: Nipishapui Nete Mushuat / Un the dans la toundra: Nipishapui Nete Mushuat	Shortlist	
2018	Dominique Fortier	Heather O'Neill	Hôtel Lonely Hearts / The Hotel Lonely Hearts	Winner	
2018	Rachel Martinez	Peter Kirby	Vague d'effroi / The Dead of Winter	Shortlist	
2018	Lori Saint-Martin and Paul Gagné	Kelly Norah Drukker	Petits feux / Small Fires	Shortlist	
2018	Lori Saint-Martin and Paul Gagné	Louise Penny	Un Outrage Mortel / A Great Reckoning	Shortlist	
2019	Oana Avasilichioaei	Catherine Lalonde	The Faerie Devouring / La dévoration des fées	Winner	
2019	Helge Dascher and Aleshia Jensen	Julie Delporte	This Woman's Work / Moi aussi je voulais l'emporter	Shortlist	
2019	Aleshia Jensen	Mathieu Poulin	Explosions / Des explosions	Shortlist	
2020	Benoît Laflamme	Melissa Bull	Éclipse électrique / The Knockoff Eclipse	Winner	
2020	Catherine Ego	Robyn Maynard	NoirEs sous surveillance. Esclavage, répression et violence d'État au Canada / Policing Black Lives: State Violence in Canada from Slavery to the Present	Shortlist	
2020	Catherine Ego	Paige Cooper	Zolitude	Shortlist	
2021	Sarah Henzi	An Antane-Kapesh	I Am a Damn Savage; What Have You Done to My Country? / Je suis une maudite sauvagesse/Eukuan nin matshimanitu innu-iskueu and Tante nana etutamin mitassi? / Qu'as-tu fait de mon pays?)	Winner	
2021	Sheila Fischman	Kim Thúy	Em	Shortlist	
2021	Donald Winkler	Frédérick Lavoie	Orwell in Cuba: How 1984 Came to Be Published in Castro's Twilight / Avant l'Après	Shortlist	
2022	Nicolas Calvé	Samir Shaheen-Hussain	Plus aucun enfant autochtone arraché / Fighting for a Hand to Hold: Confronting medical Colonialism Against Indigenous Children in Canada	Winner	
2022	Jonathan Lamy	Rachel McCrum	Le premier coup de clairon pour réveiller les femmes immorales / The First Blast to Awaken Women Degenerate	Shortlist	
2022	Lori Saint-Martin and Paul Gagné	Mordecai Richler	Fils d'un tout petit héros / Son of a Smaller Hero	Shortlist	
2023	Katia Grubisic	David Clerson	To See Out the Night (Dormir sans tête)	Winner	
2023	Aleshia Jensen, Bronwyn Haslam	Mirion Malle	This Is How I Disappear (C'est comme ça que je disparais)	Shortlist	
2023	Alex Manley	Daphné B.	Made-Up: A True Story of Beauty Culture under Late Capitalism (Maquillée)	Shortlist	
2023	Peter McCambridge	Éric Dupont	Rosa's Very Own Personal Revolution (La Logueuse)	Shortlist	
2024	Stéphane Martelly	Kaie Kellough	Équateur magnétique (Magnetic Equator)	Winner	
2024	Paul Gagné	Ann-Marie MacDonald	Fayne: L'histoire fantastique de C. Bell (Fayne)	Shortlist	
2024	Émilie Laramée	Su J. Sokol	Les lignes invisibles (Cycling to Asylum)	Shortlist	
2024	Luba Markovskaia	Gillian Sze	Peler les ramboutans (Peeling Rambutan)	Shortlist	
2024	Sophie Voillot	Sean Michaels	Te souviens-tu de ta naissance? (Do You Remember Being Born?)	Shortlist	
2025	Shira Abramovich and Lénaïg Cariou	Laura Vazquez	The Hand of the Hand (Le Main de la main)	Winner	
2025	Natalia Hero	Chris Bergeron	Valid (Valide)	Shortlist	
2025	Lazer Lederhendler	Christophe Bernard	The Hollow Beast (La bête creuse)	Shortlist	
2025	Aimee Wall	Clara Dupuis-Morency	Sadie X (Sadie X)	Shortlist	
2026	Olivia Tapeiro	Eli Tareq El Bechelany-Lynch	Arabes comme il faut (The Good Arabs)	Winner	
2026	Vicky Bernard	Liz Howard	Le trou dans le ciel (Letters in a Bruised Cosmos)	Shortlist	
2026	Catherine Leroux	Sarah Bernstein	Étude pour l'obéissance (Study for Obedience)	Shortlist	
2026	Marie C. Scholl-Dimanche	Katsi’tsakwas Ellen Gabriel and Sean Carleton	Quand tombent les aiguilles de pin : Une histoire de résistance Autochtone (When the Pine Needles Fall: Indigenous Acts of Resistance)	Shortlist	

=== Concordia University First Book Prize ===
The Concordia University First Book Prize, established in 1996 and sponsored by Concordia University, is awarded annually to the first book of an English-language Quebec writer. The award has been known as the First Book Award (1996–1998), McAuslan First Book Prize (1999–2009), the QWF First Book Prize (2010), and the Concordia University First Book Prize (2011–present).

Concordia University First Book Prize winners
Year	Author	Title	Result	Ref.
1996	Blema Steinberg	Shame and Humiliation: Presidential Decision Making on Vietnam	Winner	
1997	Irene Burstyn	Picking Up Pearls	Winner	
1997	Ashok Chandwani	Buntys and Pinkies: Chronicles of a New Canadian	Shortlist	
1997	Maurice Podbrey and R. Bruce Henry	Half Man, Half Beast: Making a Life in Canadian Theatre	Shortlist	
1998	Matthew Friedman	Fuzzy Logic: Dispatches from the Information Revolution	Winner	
1998	Judith Cowan	More Than Life Itself	Shortlist	
1998	Tess Fragoulis	Stories to Hide From Your Mother	Shortlist	
1999	Elyse Gasco	Can You Wave Bye-Bye, Baby?	Winner	
1999	Jeffrey Moore	Prisoner in a Red-Rose Chain	Shortlist	
1999	Jori Smith	Charlevoix County, 1930	Shortlist	
2000	Taras Grescoe	Sacré Blues: An Unsentimental Journey Through Quebec	Winner	
2000	Andrew Steinmetz	Wardlife, the Apprenticeship of a Young Writer as a Hospital Clerk	Shortlist	
2000	Janine Stingel	Social Discredit, Anti-Semitism, Social Credit and the Jewish Response	Shortlist	
2001	Jack Todd	A Taste of Metal: A Deserter's Story	Winner	
2001	Michael Blair	If Looks Could Kill	Shortlist	
2001	Monika Kin Gagnon	Other Conundrums: Race, Culture and Canadian Art	Shortlist	
2002	Nalini Warriar	Blues from the Malabar Coast	Winner	
2002	Derek Grout	Empress of Ireland: The Story of an Edwardian Liner	Shortlist	
2002	Morton Weinfeld	Like Everyone Else…But Different: The Paradoxical Success of Canadian Jews	Shortlist	
2003	Neale McDevitt	One Day Even Trevi Will Crumble	Winner	
2003	Ian McGillis	A Tourist's Guide to Glengarry	Shortlist	
2003	Corey Frost	My Own Devices	Shortlist	
2004	Jaspreet Singh	Seventeen Tomatoes: Tales from Kashmir	Winner	
2004	Clayton Bailey	The Expedition	Shortlist	
2004	Lt. Gen. Roméo Dallaire	Shake Hands With the Devil: The Failure of Humanity in Rwanda	Shortlist	
2005	Marci Denesiuk	The Far Away Home	Winner	
2005	Dimitri Nasrallah	Blackbodying	Winner	
2005	Matthew Fox	Cities of Weather	Shortlist	
2006	Rawi Hage	De Niro's Game	Winner	
2006	Susan Elmslie	I, Nadja, and Other Poems	Shortlist	
2006	Melissa A. Thompson	Dreadful Paris	Shortlist	
2007	Neil Smith	Bang Crunch	Winner	
2007	Angela Carr	Ropewalk	Shortlist	
2007	Nairne Holtz	The Skin Beneath	Shortlist	
2008	Adam Leith Gollner	The Fruit Hunters: A Story of Nature, Adventure, Commerce and Obsession	Winner	
2008	Liane Keightley	Seven Openings of the Head	Shortlist	
2008	Saleema Nawaz	Mother Superior	Shortlist	
2009	Eric Siblin	The Cello Suites	Winner	
2009	Gillian Sze	Fish Bones	Shortlist	
2009	Alice Zorn	Ruins and Relics	Shortlist	
2010	Sean Mills	The Empire Within: Postcolonial Thought and Political Activism in Sixties Montreal	Winner	
2010	Larissa Andrusyshyn	Mammoth	Shortlist	
2010	Doug Harris	YOU Comma Idiot	Shortlist	
2011	Ann Scowcroft	The Truth of Houses	Winner	
2011	Gabe Foreman	A Complete Encyclopedia of Different Types of People	Shortlist	
2011	Ed Macdonald	Spat the Dummy	Shortlist	
2012	Alice Petersen	All The Voices Cry	Winner	
2012	Tom Abray	Pollen	Shortlist	
2012	Michael Lithgow	Waking in the Tree House	Shortlist	
2013	Andrew Szymanski	The Barista and I	Winner	
2013	Connie Guzzo-McParland	The Girls of Piazza d'Amore	Shortlist	
2013	Shelagh Plunkett	The Water Here is Never Blue	Shortlist	
2014	Anna Leventhal	Sweet Affliction	Winner	
2014	Sean Michaels	Us Conductors	Shortlist	
2014	Caroline Vu	Palawan Story	Shortlist	
2015	Anita Anand	Swing in the House and Other Stories	Winner	
2015	Mike Steeves	Giving Up	Shortlist	
2015	Joel Wapnick	The View North from Liberal Cemetery	Shortlist	
2016	Kelly Norah Drukker	Small Fires	Winner	
2016	Sylvain Neuvel	Sleeping Giants	Shortlist	
2016	Chelsea Vowel	Indigenous Writes	Shortlist	
2017	Jocelyn Parr	Uncertain Weights and Measures	Winner	
2017	Ariela Freedman	Arabic for Beginners	Shortlist	
2017	J. Jacob Potashnik	The Golem of Hampstead and Other Stories	Shortlist	
2018	Paige Cooper	Zolitude	Winner	
2018	Robyn Maynard	Policing Black Lives: State Violence in Canada from Slavery to the Present	Shortlist	
2018	John Emil Vincent	Excitement Tax	Shortlist	
2019	Lindsay Nixon	nîtisânak	Winner	
2019	Ann Lambert	The Birds That Stay	Shortlist	
2019	Rita Pomade	Seeker: A Sea Odyssey	Shortlist	
2019	Ken Victor	We Were Like Everyone Else	Shortlist	
2020	Madelaine Caritas Longman	The Danger Model	Winner	
2020	Kama La Mackerel	ZOM-FAM	Shortlist	
2020	Yusuf Saadi	Pluviophile	Shortlist	
2021	Samir Shaheen-Hussain	Fighting for a Hand to Hold	Winner	
2021	Eli Tareq El Bechelany-Lynch	Knot Body	Shortlist	
2021	Balfour M. Mount	Ten Thousand Crossroads: The Path As I Remember It	Shortlist	
2021	Aimee Wall	We, Jane	Shortlist	
2022	Trynne Delaney	the half-drowned	Winner	
2022	Baharan Baniahmadi	Prophetess	Shortlist	
2022	D. M. Bradford	Dream of No One But Myself	Shortlist	
2022	Kasia Van Schaik	We Have Never Lived on Earth	Shortlist	
2023	Andrew Stobo Sniderman, Douglas Sanderson	Valley of the Birdtail	Winner	
2023	Sheima Benembarek	Halal Sex: The Intimate Lives of Muslim Women in North America	Shortlist	
2023	Tanya Standish McIntyre	The House You Were Born In	Shortlist	
2023	Michelle Syba	End Times	Shortlist	
2024	Sabrina Reeves	Little Crosses	Winner	
2024	Marjorie Silverman	(Un)spoken	Shortlist	
2024	Sivan Slapak	Here Is Still Here	Shortlist	
2025	Eric Andrew-Gee	The Mind Mappers: Friendship, Betrayal and the Obsessive Quest to Chart the Brain	Winner	
2025	Fred Anderson	Eyes Have Seen: From Mississippi to Montreal	Shortlist	
2025	Jessica Bebenek	No One Knows Us There	Shortlist	
2025	Amal Elsana Alh'jooj	Hope Is a Woman’s Name: My Journey as a Bedouin Palestinian Activist in Israel	Shortlist	
2026	Arizona O'Neill	Opioids and Organs	Winner	
2026	Michael Eddy	Koh-i-Noor	Shortlist	
2026	Chanel Sutherland	Layaway Child	Shortlist	

=== Mavis Gallant Prize for Non-Fiction ===
The Mavis Gallant Prize for Non-Fiction, established in 1988, is awarded annually to an English-language non-fiction book written by a Quebec author. The award was original named the Non-fiction Prize, though it changed in 1999.

Mavis Gallant Prize for Non-Fiction winners
Year	Author	Title	Result	Ref.
1988	Witold Rybczynski	Home: A Short History of an Idea	Winner	
1989	Witold Rybczynski	The Most Beautiful House in the World	Winner	
1989	Louise Abbott	The Coast Way: A Portrait of the English on the Lower North Shore of the St. Lawrence	Shortlist	
1989	Dominique Clift	The Secret Kingdom: Interpretations of the Canadian Character	Shortlist	
1990	David Solway	Education Lost: Reflections on Contemporary Pedogogical Practice	Winner	
1990	Marc Raboy	Missed Opportunities: The Story of Canada's Broadcasting Policy	Shortlist	
1990	Charles Taylor	Sources of the Self: The Making of Modern Identity	Shortlist	
1991	Donald MacKay	Flight from Famine	Winner	
1991	Reid Scowen	A Different Vision: The English in Quebec in the 90s	Shortlist	
1991	Margaret Westley	Remembrance of Grandeur: The Anglo-Protestant Elite of Montreal	Shortlist	
1992	Mary Meigs	In the Company of Strangers	Winner	
1992	Charles Foran	Sketches in Winter	Shortlist	
1992	Charles Taylor	The Malaise of Modernity	Shortlist	
1993	Zhimei Zhang	Foxspirit: A Woman in Mao's China	Winner	
1993	John Laffey	Civilization and its Discontented	Shortlist	
1993	Ruth Wisse	If I Am Not for Myself: The Liberal Betrayal of the Jews	Shortlist	
1994	Laura S. Groening	E.K. Brown: A Study in Conflict	Winner	
1994	Ghitta Caiserman-Roth and Rhoda Cohen	Insights, Discoveries, Surprises	Shortlist	
1994	Laura Smith Groening	E. K. Brown: A Study in Conflict	Shortlist	
1995	Charles Foran	The Last House of Ulster: A Family in Belfast	Winner	
1995	Sharon Batt	Patient No More: The Politics of Breast Cancer	Shortlist	
1995	Michael Malus	Before the End of the Day: Stories from a Doctor's Journal	Shortlist	
1996	T. F. Rigelhof	A Blue Boy in a Black Dress: A Memoir	Winner	
1996	Ann Charney	Defiance in Their Eyes	Shortlist	
1996	André Picard	The Gift of Death	Shortlist	
1997	William Weintraub	City Unique: Montreal Days and Nights in the 40s and 50s	Winner	
1997	Joe Fiorito	Tango on the Main	Shortlist	
1997	Elaine Kalman Naves	Journey to Vaja	Shortlist	
1998	David Manicom	Progeny of Ghosts: Travels in Russia and the Old Empire	Winner	
1998	Alan Hustak	Saint Patrick's of Montreal: The Biography of a Basilica	Shortlist	
1998	W. Gillies Ross	This Distant and Unsurveyed Country	Shortlist	
1999	Elaine Kalman Naves	Putting Down Roots	Winner	
1999	Robert Hill	Voice of the Vanishing Minority	Shortlist	
1999	Jori Smith	Charlevoix County, 1930	Shortlist	
2000	Taras Grescoe	Sacré Blues: An Unsentimental Journey Through Quebec	Winner	
2000	Nicholas Regush	The Virus Within, A Coming Epidemic	Shortlist	
2000	Andrew Steinmetz	Wardlife, the Apprenticeship of a Young Writer as a Hospital Clerk	Shortlist	
2001	Jack Todd	A Taste of Metal: A Deserter's Story	Winner	
2001	Phil Jenkins	River Song: Sailing the History of the St. Lawrence	Shortlist	
2001	William Weintraub	Getting Started: A Memoir of the 1950s	Shortlist	
2002	Henry T. Aubin	The Rescue of Jerusalem	Winner	
2002	Tod Hoffman	LeCarré's Landscape	Shortlist	
2002	Margaret Lock	Twice Dead: Organ Transplants and the Re-invention of Death	Shortlist	
2003	Elaine Kalman Naves	Shoshanna's Story	Winner	
2003	Tod Adams	A Love of Reading: The Second Collection	Shortlist	
2003	Taras Grescoe	The End of Elsewhere	Shortlist	
2004	Joel Yanofsky	Mordecai and Me: An Appreciation of a Kind	Winner	
2004	Lt. Gen. Roméo Dallaire	Shake Hands With the Devil: The Failure of Humanity in Rwanda	Shortlist	
2004	Julian Sher and William Marsden	The Road to Hell: How the Biker Gangs Are Conquering Canada	Shortlist	
2005	Fred Bruemmer	Survival: A Refugee Life	Winner	
2005	Alan Hustak	Sir William Hingston (1829–1907): Montreal Mayor, Surgeon and Banker	Shortlist	
2005	Carmine Starnino	A Lover's Quarrel	Shortlist	
2006	Sherry Simon	Translating Montreal: Episodes in the Life of a Divided City	Winner	
2006	William Marsden and Julian Sher	Angels of Death	Shortlist	
2006	Byron Rempel	Truth Is Naked, All Others Pay Cash	Shortlist	
2007	Julie Barlow and Jean-Benoît Nadeau	The Story of French	Winner	
2007	Margaret Somerville	The Ethical Imagination	Shortlist	
2007	Vikki Stark	My Sister, My Self: Understanding the Relationship That Shapes Our Lives, Our Loves, and Ourselves	Shortlist	
2008	Taras Grescoe	Bottomfeeder: How to Eat Ethically in a World of Vanishing Seafood	Winner	
2008	Adam Gollner	The Fruit Hunters: A Story of Nature, Adventure, Commerce and Obsession	Shortlist	
2008	Byron Rempel	No Limits: The Amazing Life Story of Rhona and Rhoda Wurtele, Canada's Olympian Skiing Pioneers	Shortlist	
2009	Eric Siblin	The Cello Suites	Winner	
2009	Yves Engler	The Black Book of Canadian	Shortlist	
2009	Patrick McDonagh	Idiocy: A Cultural History	Shortlist	
2010	Cleo Paskal	Global Warring: How Environmental, Economic, and Political Crises Will Redraw the World Map	Winner	
2010	Avi Friedman	A Place in Mind: the Search for Authenticity	Shortlist	
2010	Frank Mackey	Done with Slavery	Shortlist	
2011	Joel Yanofsky	Bad Animals: A Father's Accidental Education in Autism	Winner	
2011	Lt. Gen. Roméo Dallaire	They Fight Like Soldiers, They Die Like Children	Shortlist	
2011	Merrily Weisbord	The Love Queen of Malabar: Memoir of a Friendship with Kamala Das	Shortlist	
2012	Taras Grescoe	Straphanger: Saving Our Cities and Ourselves from the Automobile	Winner	
2012	William Marsden	Fools Rule: Inside the Failed Politics of Climate Change	Shortlist	
2012	Julija Šukys	Epistolophilia: Writing the Life of Ona Šimaitė	Shortlist	
2013	Adam Leith Gollner	The Book of Immortality	Winner	
2013	Maximilian Forte	Slouching Towards Sirte	Shortlist	
2013	Shelagh Plunkett	The Water Here is Never Blue	Shortlist	
2014	Chantal Hébert	The Morning After: The 1995 Quebec Referendum and the Day that Almost Was	Winner	
2014	Issa J. Boullata	The Bells of Memory	Shortlist	
2014	Margaret Lock	The Alzheimer Conundrum: Entanglements of Dementia and Aging	Shortlist	
2015	Carlos Fraenkel	Teaching Plato in Palestine: Philosophy in a Divided World	Winner	
2015	Judith Cowan	The Permanent Nature of Everything: A Memoir	Shortlist	
2015	Kathleen Winter	Boundless	Shortlist	
2016	Daniel J. Levitin	A Field Guide to Lies: Critical Thinking in the Information Age	Winner	
2016	Taras Grescoe	Shanghai Grand	Shortlist	
2016	Chelsea Vowel	Indigenous Writes	Shortlist	
2017	Sandra Perron	Out Standing in the Field: A Memoir by Canada's First Female Infantry Officer	Winner	
2017	E. A. Heaman	Tax, Order, and Good Government: A New Political History of Canada, 1867–1917	Shortlist	
2017	Laila Parsons	The Commander: Fawzi al-Qawuqji and the Fight for Arab Independence, 1914–1948	Shortlist	
2018	Judi Rever	In Praise of Blood: The Crimes of the Rwandan Patriotic Front	Winner	
2018	Robyn Maynard	Policing Black Lives: State Violence in Canada from Slavery to the Present	Shortlist	
2018	Erín Moure	Sitting Shiva on Minto Avenue, by 'Toots'	Shortlist	
2019	Susan Doherty	The Ghost Garden	Winner	
2019	Mark Abley	The Organist	Shortlist	
2019	Jas M. Morgan	nîtisânak	Shortlist	
2020	Taras Grescoe	Possess the Air: Love, Heroism, and the Battle for the Soul of Mussolini's Rome	Winner	
2020	Danielle Bobker	The Closet: The Eighteenth-Century Architecture of Intimacy	Shortlist	
2020	M. Max Hamon	The Audacity of His Enterprise: Louis Riel and the Métis Nation That Canada Never Was, 1840–1875	Shortlist	
2021	Samir Shaheen-Hussain	Fighting for a Hand to Hold	Winner	
2021	Tanya Bellehumeur-Allatt	Peacekeeper's Daughter: A Middle-East Memoir	Shortlist	
2021	Karen Messing	Bent Out of Shape	Shortlist	
2021	André Picard	Neglected No More: The Urgent Need to Improve the Lives of Canada's Elders in the Wake of a Pandemic	Shortlist	
2021	Robyn Sarah	Music, Late and Soon	Shortlist	
2022	Taras Raboy	Looking for Alicia: The Unfinished Life of an Argentinian Rebel	Winner	
2022	Nora Loreto	Spin Doctors: How Media and Politicians Misdiagnosed the COVID-19 Pandemic	Shortlist	
2022	Christopher Neal	The Rebel Scribe: Carleton Beals and the Progressive Challenge to U.S. Policy in Latin America	Shortlist	
2022	Sina Queyras	Rooms: Women, Writing, Woolf	Shortlist	
2023	Andrew Stobo Sniderman, Douglas Sanderson	Valley of the Birdtail	Winner	
2023	Alex Manley	The New Masculinity: A Roadmap for a 21st-Century Definition of Manhood	Shortlist	
2023	Julian Sher	The North Star: Canada and the Civil War Plots Against Lincoln	Shortlist	
2023	Debra Thompson	The Long Road Home: On Blackness and Belonging	Shortlist	
2024	Gail Scott	Furniture Music	Winner	
2024	Judith Adamson	Ghost Stories: On Writing Biography	Shortlist	
2024	Taras Grescoe	The Lost Supper: Searching for the Future of Food in the Tastes of the Past	Shortlist	
2024	Don Weekes	Picturing the Game: An Illustrated Story of Hockey	Shortlist	
2025	Haley Mlotek	No Fault: A Memoir of Romance and Divorce	Winner	
2025	Amal Elsana Alh'jooj	Hope Is a Woman’s Name: My Journey as a Bedouin Palestinian Activist in Israel	Shortlist	
2025	Eric Andrew-Gee	The Mind Mappers: Friendship, Betrayal and the Obsessive Quest to Chart the Brain	Shortlist	
2026	Natalie Doonan	Eating the Urban Wild: Food and Foraging in Montreal	Winner	
2026	Kathryn Jezer-Morton	The Story of Your Life: How Social Media Shapes the Way We Experience Everything	Shortlist	
2026	Anita Slominska	Other Endings: Organ Transplantation and the Burdens of Hope	Shortlist	
2026	Mary Soderstrom	Before We Forget: How Remembering Will Get Us Through the Next 75 Years	Shortlist	

=== Judy Mappin Community Award ===
The Judy Mappin Community Award, established in 1995 and first awarded to Judith Mappin, is awarded annually "to a member of the extended literary community who has made a significant and longstanding contribution to the development and/or dissemination of English-language literature in Quebec."

Judy Mappin Community Award winners
Year	Author	Description	Ref.
1995	Judith Mappin	Her role in founding QSPELL and its prizes, her tireless work as a bookseller who promoted local authors, and her visionary role in the creation of a genuine Canadian literature in both the French and English languages	
1996	Bryan Demchinsky	His work promoting local authors as Books editor of the Montreal Gazette	
1997	Shelley Pomerance	Her work promoting literature and writers at CBC Radio	
1998	Simon Dardick and Nancy Marrelli	Their work at Véhicule Press	
1999	Mireille Goulet	The commitment and professionalism she displayed in her work for the Electronic Rights Defence Committee	
2000	Patricia Pleszcynska	Her work at CBC Radio	
2001	Germain Lefebvre	His work as Cultural Advisor of CACUM: Conseil des Arts de la CUM	
2002	Linda Shohet	Her work as the Director of The Centre of Literacy of Quebec	
2003	Linda Leith	Her work as the Founder and artistic director of the Blue Metropolis Montreal International Literary Festival and as a teacher, author, literary translator, editor, and community activist	
2004	Margaret Goldik and Ian McGillis	The professionalism and judgment they brought to their work as co-editors of the Montreal Review of Books	
2005	Guy Rodgers	His role in the founding and flourishing of many major arts organizations, including the Federation of English-language Writers of Quebec, the Quebec Drama Federation, the Quebec Writers' Federation, and the English-Language Arts Network	
2006	Julie Keith	Her good judgment, graciousness, and unwavering commitment to advancing the cause of English-language literature in Quebec	
2007	André Vanasse	The inclusiveness and power of his vision of Quebec literature	
2008	Mary Soderstrom	Her indefatigable service to the writing community as an organizer, writer, and advocate	
2009	Luci and Adrian King-Edwards	Their work at The Word bookstore, Montreal	
2010	Ilona Martonfi	Her tireless work promoting writers through The Yellow Door and the Visual Arts Centre reading series	
2011	Endre Farkas	His work as a producer, editor, and publisher, and for the inclusiveness and power of his vision for Quebec literature	
2012	Steve Luxton	His invaluable contributions as a teacher, mentor, editor, publisher, and writer	
2013	No award was presented in 2013		
2014	Elizabeth Macdonnell	Her longstanding dedication to fostering a love of learning, literacy, and the English language during her work with the Montreal Children's Library	
2015	Maya Munro Byers	The invaluable care and advice she has given to book lovers and writers, and for her role in instilling a love of literature in throngs of children	
2016	Rana Bose	The unflagging focus, determination, and modesty with which he built and maintained Serai and Montreal Serai	
2017	Philip Lanthier	His work with Matrix and the Knowlton Literary Association	
2018	Lynn Verge	Her work with Atwater Library and Computer Centre	
2019	Louis Rastelli	His work championing underground publishing and dedicated service to Montreal's independent writing community	
2020	Jan Jorgensen	Her hard work, leadership, and longstanding personal commitment to community in all its forms	
2021	H. Nigel Thomas	Offering advice and opportunity to scores of students and writers, always with generosity, humility, and good humour	
2021	Richard King	Dedicating almost 50 years of his life to serving readers, promoting books, and supporting the English-language writing community	
2022	Ian Ferrier	His lifelong commitment to leading, supporting, and inspiring writers and artists in Montreal and beyond.	
2023	Elise Moser	Contribution and dedication to literary arts in Quebec	
2024	Christopher DiRaddo	His enduring commitment to nurturing the literary arts and literary communities in Quebec	
2025	Jan Draper	Her unwavering dedication to expanding inclusive literary spaces and her commitment to nurturing new voices in the Eastern Townships and beyond	
2026	Rahul Varma	His tenacity, vision, and tireless work to diversify and decolonize theatre and create opportunities for marginalized voices in Canadian theatre and society	

=== A. M. Klein Prize for Poetry ===
The A. M. Klein Prize for Poetry, established in 1988, is awarded annually to a book of English-language poetry written by a Quebec poet. The prize was known as the Poetry Prize from 1988 to 1922. From 2011 to 2015, the prize was sponsored by Richard Pound, in memory of his brother Robert, and in 2022, it was sponsored by Byron Rempel.

A. M. Klein Prize for Poetry
Year	Author	Title	Result	Ref.
1988	David Solway	Modern Marriage	Winner	
1989	D. G. Jones	Balthazar and Other Poems	Winner	
1989	Mark Abley	Blue Sand, Blue Moon	Shortlist	
1989	Louis Dudek	Infinite Worlds: The Poetry of Louis Dudek	Shortlist	
1990	Bruce Taylor	Cold Rubber Feet	Winner	
1990	Erín Moure	WSW (West South West)	Winner	
1991	Eric Ormsby	Bavarian Shrine and Other Poems	Winner	
1991	Charlotte Hussey	Rue Sainte Famille	Shortlist	
1991	Paddy Webb	Woman Listening	Shortlist	
1992	Naomi Guttman	Reasons for Winter	Winner	
1992	Louis Dudek	Small Perfect Things	Shortlist	
1992	Sharon Nelson	The Work of Our Hands	Shortlist	
1993	Ralph Gustafson	Configurations at Midnight	Winner	
1993	Anne Carson	Short Talks	Shortlist	
1993	Eric Ormsby	Coastlines	Shortlist	
1994	Julie Bruck	The Woman Downstairs	Winner	
1994	Raymond Filip	Flowers in Magnetic Fields	Winner	
1994	Erín Moure	Sheepish Beauty, Civilian Love	Shortlist	
1994	Ruth Taylor	The Dragon Papers	Shortlist	
1995	D. G. Jones	The Floating Garden	Winner	
1995	Mark Abley	Glasburyon	Shortlist	
1996	Anne Carson	Glass, Irony and God	Winner	
1996	Erín Moure	Search Procedures	Shortlist	
1996	Carolyn Marie Souaid	Swimming into the Light	Shortlist	
1997	Ralph Gustafson	Visions Fugitive	Winner	
1997	Stephen Schecter	David and Jonathan	Shortlist	
1997	Carmine Starnino	The New World	Shortlist	
1998	Anne Carson	Autobiography of Red	Winner	
1998	Mary di Michele	Debriefing the Rose	Shortlist	
1998	David Manicom	The Older Graces	Shortlist	
1999	Bruce Taylor	Facts	Winner	
1999	D. G. Jones	Grounding Sight	Shortlist	
1999	Erín Moure	A Frame of the Book	Shortlist	
2000	Rachel Rose	Giving My Body to Science	Winner	
2000	Faizal Deen	Land Without Chocolate	Shortlist	
2000	Carolyn Marie Souaid	October	Shortlist	
2001	Anne Carson	The Beauty of the Husband	Winner	
2001	Jason Camlot	The Animal Library	Shortlist	
2001	Andrew Steinmetz	Histories	Shortlist	
2002	Norm Sibum	Girls and Handsome Dogs	Winner	
2002	Portlin Cochise	A Bulldog's Guide to Small Engine Repair	Shortlist	
2002	Erín Moure	O'Cidadán	Shortlist	
2003	Susan Gillis	Volta	Winner	
2003	Carolyn Marie Souaid	Snow Formations	Shortlist	
2003	Carolyn Zonailo	The Goddess in the Garden	Shortlist	
2004	Carmine Starnino	With English Subtitles	Winner	
2004	Robyn Sarah	A Day's Grace: Poems 1997–2002	Shortlist	
2004	David Solway	Franklin's Passage	Shortlist	
2005	Erín Moure	Little Theatres	Winner	
2005	Mark Abley	The Silver Palace Restaurant	Shortlist	
2005	Sherwin Tjia	The World is a Heartbreaker	Shortlist	
2006	Susan Elmslie	I, Nadja and Other Poems	Winner	
2006	Jon Paul Fiorentino	The Theory of the Loser Class	Shortlist	
2006	Lazar Sarna	He Claims He Is the Direct Heir	Shortlist	
2007	Erín Moure	O Cadoiro	Winner	
2007	David Solway	Reaching for Clear: The Poetry of Rhys Savarin	Shortlist	
2007	David McGimpsey	Sitcom	Shortlist	
2008	Peter Richardson	Sympathy for the Couriers	Winner	
2008	Joshua Auerbach	Radius of Light	Shortlist	
2008	Katia Grubisic	What if red ran out	Shortlist	
2009	Carmine Starnino	This Way Out	Winner	
2009	Norm Sibum	The Pangborn Defence	Shortlist	
2009	Mike Spry	Jack	Shortlist	
2010	Kate Hall	The Certainty Dream	Winner	
2010	Michael Harris	Circus	Shortlist	
2010	Erín Moure	O Resplandor	Shortlist	
2011	Gabe Foreman	A Complete Encyclopedia of Different Types of People	Winner	
2011	Asa Boxer	Skullduggery	Shortlist	
2011	Jack Hannan	Some Frames	Shortlist	
2012	Oana Avasilichioaei	We, Beasts	Winner	
2012	Mary di Michele	The Flower of Youth	Shortlist	
2012	Susan Gillis	The Rapids	Shortlist	
2013	Ken Howe	The Civic-Mindedness of Trees	Winner	
2013	Mia Anderson	The Sunrise Liturgy: A Poem Sequence	Shortlist	
2013	Peter Dubé	Conjure	Shortlist	
2014	Sina Queyras	MxT	Winner	
2014	Angela Carr	Here in There	Shortlist	
2014	Jon Paul Fiorentino	Needs Improvement	Shortlist	
2014	Gillian Sze	Peeling Rambutan	Shortlist	
2015	David McGimpsey	Asbestos Heights	Winner	
2015	Catherine Kidd	Hyena Subpoena	Shortlist	
2015	Erín Moure	Kapusta	Shortlist	
2016	Kelly Norah Drukker	Small Fires	Winner	
2016	Sarah Burgoyne	Saint Twin	Shortlist	
2016	Alison Strumberger and Gillian Sze	Redrafting Winter	Shortlist	
2017	Erin Robinsong	Rag Cosmology	Winner	
2017	Linda Besner	Feel Happier in Nine Seconds	Shortlist	
2017	Rebecca Papucaru	The Panic Room	Shortlist	
2018	Sina Queyras	My Ariel	Winner	
2018	Susan Elmslie	Museum of Kindness	Shortlist	
2018	Gillian Sze	Panicle	Shortlist	
2019	T. Liem	Obits	Winner	
2019	Kaie Kellough	Magnetic Equator	Shortlist	
2019	Shannon Webb-Campbell	I am a Body of Land	Shortlist	
2020	Sarah Wolfson	A Common Name for Everything	Winner	
2020	Oana Avasilichioaei	Eight Track	Shortlist	
2020	Simina Banu	POP	Shortlist	
2020	Peter Dubé	The Headless Man	Shortlist	
2020	stephanie roberts	rushes from the river disappointment	Shortlist	
2021	Sarah Venart	I Am the Big Heart	Winner	
2021	Sarah Burgoyne	Because the Sun	Shortlist	
2021	Klara du Plessis	Hell Light Flesh	Shortlist	
2021	Jessie Jones	The Fool	Shortlist	
2022	D. M. Bradford	Dream of No One But Myself	Winner	
2022	Avery Lake	Horrible Dance	Shortlist	
2022	Prathna Lor	Emanations	Shortlist	
2022	Gillian Sze	Quiet Night Think	Shortlist	
2023	Erin Robinsong	Wet Dream	Winner	
2023	River Halen	Dream Rooms	Shortlist	
2023	T. Liem	Slows: Twice	Shortlist	
2024	Derek Webster	National Animal	Winner	
2024	D. M. Bradford	Bottom Rail on Top	Shortlist	
2024	Mary Dean Lee	Tidal	Shortlist	
2024	Jay Ritchie	Listening in Many Publics	Shortlist	
2025	Gillian Sze	An Orange, A Syllable	Winner	
2025	Jessica Bebenek	No One Knows Us There	Shortlist	
2025	Klara du Plessis	Post-Mortem of the Event	Shortlist	
2025	Todd Meyers	Gone Gone	Shortlist	
2025	stephanie roberts	UNMET	Shortlist	
2026	Misha Solomon	My Great-Grandfather Danced Ballet	Winner	
2026	Gwen Aube	Missed Connections with Tall Girls	Shortlist	
2026	Kaie Kellough	Interposition	Shortlist	

=== Paragraphe Hugh MacLennan Prize for Fiction ===
The Paragraphe Hugh MacLennan Prize for Fiction, established in 1988, is presented annually to an English-language Quebec writer of fiction.

Paragraphe Hugh MacLennan Prize for Fiction winners
Year	Author	Title	Result	Ref.
1988	Hugh Hood	The Motor Boys in Ottawa	Winner	
1989	Kenneth Radu	Distant Relations	Winner	
1989	Roma Gelblum Bross	To Samerkand and Back	Shortlist	
1989	David Homel	Electrical Storms	Shortlist	
1990	Mordecai Richler	Solomon Gursky Was Here	Winner	
1990	Ludmilla Beresko	The Parcel from Chicken Street	Shortlist	
1990	Nino Ricci	Lives of the Saints	Shortlist	
1991	Kenneth Radu	A Private Performance	Winner	
1991	Keith Harrison	Eyemouth	Shortlist	
1991	Claudia Morrison	From the Foot of the Mountain	Shortlist	
1992	Ray Smith	A Night at the Opera	Winner	
1992	Dennis Denisoff	Dog Years	Shortlist	
1992	Yeshim Ternar	Orphaned by Halley's Comet	Shortlist	
1993	P. Scott Lawrence	Missing Fred Astaire	Winner	
1993	T. F. Rigelhof	Je t'aime Cowboy	Shortlist	
1993	Gail Scott	Main Brides	Shortlist	
1994	Ann Diamond	Evil Eye	Winner	
1994	Jean-Guy Carrier	The End of War	Shortlist	
1994	H. Nigel Thomas	Spirits in the Dark	Shortlist	
1995	George Szanto	Friends & Marriages	Winner	
1995	Akhtar Naraghi	The Big Green House	Shortlist	
1995	Mary Soderstrom	Endangered Species	Shortlist	
1996	Trevor Ferguson	The Time Keeper	Winner	
1996	Benet Davetian	The Seventh Circle	Shortlist	
1996	Yeshim Ternar	True Romance with a Sailor	Shortlist	
1997	Charles Foran	Butterfly Lovers	Winner	
1997	Connie Barnes Rose	Getting Out of Town	Shortlist	
1997	Mary Soderstrom	Finding the Enemy	Shortlist	
1998	Mordecai Richler	Barney's Version	Winner	
1998	Robert Majzels	City of Forgetting	Shortlist	
1998	Robyn Sarah	Promise of Shelter	Shortlist	
1999	Elyse Gasco	Can You Wave Bye-Bye, Baby?	Winner	
1999	Neil Bissoondath	The Worlds Within Her	Shortlist	
1999	John Farrow	City of Ice	Shortlist	
2000	Julie Keith	The Devil Out There	Winner	
2000	Will Aitken	Realia	Shortlist	
2000	John Lavery	Very Good Butter	Shortlist	
2001	Yann Martel	Life of Pi	Winner	
2001	John Farrow	Ice Lake	Shortlist	
2001	Kate Sterns	Down There By the Train	Shortlist	
2002	Neil Bissoondath	Doing the Heart Good	Winner	
2002	John Brooke	All Pure Souls	Shortlist	
2002	Steven Manners	Wound Ballistics	Shortlist	
2003	David Homel	The Speaking Cure	Winner	
2003	Edeet Ravel	Ten Thousand Lovers	Shortlist	
2003	Ian McGillis	A Tourist's Guide to Glengarry	Shortlist	
2004	Edeet Ravel	Look for Me	Winner	
2004	Jeffrey Moore	The Memory Artists	Shortlist	
2004	Gordon Sheppard	Ha! A Self-Murder Mystery	Shortlist	
2005	Neil Bissoondath	The Unyielding Clamour of the Night	Winner	
2005	Denise Roig	Any Day Now	Shortlist	
2005	William Weintraub	Crazy About Lily	Shortlist	
2006	Rawi Hage	De Niro's Game	Winner	
2006	Anita Rau Badami	Can You Hear the Nightbird Call?	Shortlist	
2006	Barry Webster	The Sound of All Flesh	Shortlist	
2007	Heather O'Neill	Lullabies for Little Criminals	Winner	
2007	Liam Durcan	Garcìa's Heart	Shortlist	
2007	Neil Smith	Bang Crunch	Shortlist	
2008	Rawi Hage	Cockroach	Winner	
2008	Andrew Hood	Pardon Our Monsters	Shortlist	
2008	Jaspreet Singh	Chef	Shortlist	
2009	Colin McAdam	Fall	Winner	
2009	Jon Paul Fiorentino	Stripmalling	Shortlist	
2009	Harold Hoefle	The Mountain Clinic	Shortlist	
2010	Miguel Syjuco	Illustrado	Winner	
2010	Jeffrey Moore	The Extinction Club	Shortlist	
2010	Doug Harris	YOU Comma Idiot	Shortlist	
2011	Dimitri Nasrallah	Niko	Winner	
2011	David Homel	Midway	Shortlist	
2011	Madeleine Thien	Dogs at the Perimeter	Shortlist	
2012	Rawi Hage	Carnival	Winner	
2012	Tom Abray	Pollen	Shortlist	
2012	Anita Rau Badami	Tell It to the Trees	Shortlist	
2013	Saleema Nawaz	Bone and Bread	Winner	
2013	Jocelyne Dubois	World of Glass	Shortlist	
2013	Lorne Elliott	Beach Reading	Shortlist	
2014	Sean Michaels	Us Conductors	Winner	
2014	Jon Paul Fiorentino	I'm Not Scared of You or Anything	Shortlist	
2014	Guillaume Morissette	New Tab	Shortlist	
2015	Neil Smith	Boo	Winner	
2015	Heather O'Neill	Daydreams of Angels	Shortlist	
2015	H. Nigel Thomas	No Safeguards	Shortlist	
2016	Liam Durcan	The Measure of Darkness	Winner	
2016	Jack Hannan	The Poet is a Radio	Shortlist	
2016	Madeleine Thien	Do Not Say We Have Nothing	Shortlist	
2016	Jacob Wren	Rich and Poor	Shortlist	
2017	Heather O'Neill	The Lonely Hearts Hotel	Winner	
2017	Cora Sire	Behold Things Beautiful	Shortlist	
2017	Kathleen Winter	Lost in September	Shortlist	
2018	Eliza Robertson	Demi-Gods	Winner	
2018	Paige Cooper	Zolitude	Shortlist	
2018	Rawi Hage	Beirut Hellfire Society	Shortlist	
2019	David Homel	The Teardown	Winner	
2019	Michael Carin	Churchill at Munich	Shortlist	
2019	Ariela Freedman	A Joy To Be Hidden	Shortlist	
2019	Catherine McKenzie	I'll Never Tell	Shortlist	
2020	Kaie Kellough	Dominoes at the Crossroads	Winner	
2020	Endre Farkas	Home Game	Shortlist	
2020	Sean Michaels	The Wagers	Shortlist	
2020	Ceilidh Michelle	Butterflies, Zebras, Moonbeams	Shortlist	
2021	Mikhail Iossel	Love Like Water, Love Like Fire	Winner	
2021	Saleema Nawaz	Songs for the End of the World	Shortlist	
2021	Aimee Wall	We, Jane	Shortlist	
2021	Kathleen Winter	Undersong	Shortlist	
2022	Baharan Baniahmadi	Prophetess	Winner	
2022	Anita Anand	A Convergence of Solitudes	Shortlist	
2022	Rawi Hage	Stray Dogs	Shortlist	
2022	Neil Smith	Jones	Shortlist	
2023	Ann-Marie MacDonald	Fayne	Winner	
2023	David C. C. Bourgeois	Full Fadom Five	Shortlist	
2023	Sean Michaels	Do You Remember Being Born?	Shortlist	
2023	Vanessa R. Sasson	The Gathering	Shortlist	
2023	Caroline Vu	Catinat Boulevard	Shortlist	
2024	Sabrina Reeves	Little Crosses	Winner	
2024	Susan Doherty	Monday Rent Boy	Shortlist	
2024	Irena Karafilly	Arrested Song	Shortlist	
2024	Heather O'Neill	The Capital of Dreams	Shortlist	
2024	Jacob Wren	Dry Your Tears to Perfect Your Aim	Shortlist	
2025	Madeleine Thien	The Book of Records	Winner	
2025	Arjun Basu	The Reeds	Shortlist	
2025	Lee Lai	Cannon	Shortlist	
2025	Leila Marshy	My Thievery of the People	Shortlist	
2025	Heather O'Neill and Arizona O'Neill	Valentine in Montreal	Shortlist	
2025	Zeenat Nagree	My Summer Vacation	Winner	
2025	Michael Carin	Edisson and Jeremiah	Shortlist	
2025	Brenda Hartwell	No Wrong Seasons	Shortlist	
2025	Kevin Jagernauth	The Longest Death	Shortlist	
2025	Chanel Sutherland	Layaway Child	Shortlist	

=== QWF Playwriting Prize ===
The QWF Playwriting Prize, established in 2018, is award every other year in even-numbered years. Typically, plays published "published or produced during the two previous years" are eligible. However, due to the COVID-19 pandemic's impact on theatre, plays have been eligible for the award if they have been published or produced since 2018, "provided that the play was not already submitted for the 2020 prize."

The QWF Playwriting Prize winner received a $3,000 prize, as well as "a reading as part of Infinithéâtre's Pipeline Reading Series."

QWF Playwriting Prize
Year	Author	Title	Result	Ref.
2018	Erin Shields	Paradise Lost	Winner	
2018	Stephen Orlov	"Sperm Count" (in Double Exposure: Plays of the Jewish and Palestinian Diasporas)	Shortlist	
2018	Paul Van Dyck	When Memories Have Us (Based on the original script co-written by Paul Van Dyck and Caitlin Murphy)	Shortlist	
2018	Rahul Varma	Truth and Treason	Shortlist	
2020	Mishka Lavigne	Albumen	Winner	
2020	Alexandria Haber	Alice and the World We Live In	Shortlist	
2020	Mona'a Malik	Sania the Destroyer	Shortlist	
2020	Erin Shields	Instant	Shortlist	
2022	Erin Shields	The Millennial Malcontent	Winner	
2022	Alexandria Haber and Ned Cox	The Silent Woman	Shortlist	
2022	Arthur Holden	Beloved	Shortlist	
2022	Erin Shields	Beautiful Man	Shortlist	
2024	Leanna Brodie, Jovanni Sy	Salesman in China	Winner	
2024	Jessica B. Hill	The Dark Lady	Shortlist	
2024	Mishka Lavigne	Shorelines	Shortlist	
2024	Julie Tamiko Manning	Mizushōbai (The Water Trade)	Shortlist	
2024	Rachel Mutombo	Vierge	Shortlist	
2026	Rachel McCrum and Amélie Prévost	La Belle-mère / The Stepmother	Winner	
2026	Shahrzad Arshadi and Anna Chatterton	Children of Fire	Shortlist	
2026	Marie Barlizo	The Healing	Shortlist	
2026	Gillian Clark	Adventures	Shortlist	
2026	Jovanni Sy	The Tao of the World	Shortlist	

=== Ian Ferrier Spoken Word Prize ===
The Ian Ferrier Spoken Word Prize, established in 2022 as the QWF Spoken Word Prize and renamed in 2023 in honor of Ian Ferrier, "is open to Quebec-based spoken word artists, storytelling artists, and literary performance artists working primarily in English in any form of performative writing."

Ian Ferrier Spoken Word Prize
Year	Author	Title	Result	Ref
2022	Lucia De Luca	"Not in the Bike Commercial"	Winner	
2022	Roen Higgins	"Free Your Mind"	Winner	
2022	Erín Moure	"Odiama"	Winner	
2023	Deb Vanslet	"Laughter in the Rain"	Winner	
2023	Caitlin Murphy	"All the Screams"	Winner	
2023	BeWyrd	"Survival Mechanisms"	Winner	
2023	Lucia De Luca	"Stalling"	Shortlist	
2023	nic lachance	"when the shame smokes"	Shortlist	
2023	Alexis O'Hara	"Ouff – The Land"	Shortlist	
2023	Raïssa Simone	"Buying History"	Shortlist	
2023	Svens Telemaque	"Out of Space"	Shortlist	
2024	Moe Clark	"committing a dream / pâwakan Palestine"	Winner	
2024	Lucia De Luca	"Congratulations"	Winner	
2024	Mac van den Hoeven	"Memory Justice"	Winner	
2024	Roger Sinha	"Hater’s n Baiters: The Culture Collision"	Shortlist	
2024	Fortner Anderson	"Excerpts from 'Reiterations'"	Shortlist	
2024	Emilia Malpica-Iruegas	"twenty-one"	Shortlist	
2024	Simon Brown	"Please Don't Tell Me"	Shortlist	
2025	Svens Telemaque	"If Hatian Blood Were Oil"	Winner	
2025	Romel Sylne Jr	"Math"	Winner	
2025	Octavie Doherty-Haigh	"The Itch"	Winner	
2025	Rusty	"Innocence"	Shortlist	
2025	Claire Sherwood	"Before He Was a Park"	Shortlist	
2025	Liana Cusmano	"Snails"	Shortlist	
2025	Kym Dominique-Ferguson	"I Need to Write"	Shortlist	
2025	Rachel McCrum	"The Stepmother (excerpt)"	Shortlist	
2026	Silas James	"Space Is a Vacuum"	Winner	
2026	Deb Vanslet	"Fancy Man"	Winner	
2026	BarbedWire	"Our Desire, Our Resistance"	Shortlist	
2026	Emma Beko	"Promise / I bark at the moon so the sun knows I've held on"	Shortlist	
2026	B. Lovingkin	"Finality Looms in the Air..."	Shortlist	
2026	Caitlin Murphy	Terrible Fish (excerpt)	Shortlist	
2026	Tracey Steer	"Hot"	Shortlist	
2026	Romel Sylne	"From The Top"	Shortlist	
