= Andrew Steinmetz =

Canadian writer, editor and musician (born c. 1965)

Andrew Steinmetz is a Canadian writer, editor and musician.

He was born in Montreal, Quebec in 1965. Steinmetz formed the band Weather Permitting in 1985. In the 1990s, he was a member of the Montreal alt-country band Good Cookies.

Steinmetz is the author of five books, including a memoir, Wardlife: The Apprenticeship of a Young Writer as a Hospital Clerk (1999), two collections of poetry, and a novel, Eva's Threepenny Theatre, which tells the story of his great-aunt Eva who performed in one of the first touring productions of Bertolt Brecht's masterpiece The Threepenny Opera. His novelistic memoir of his mother, Eva's Threepenny Theatre, won the 2009 City of Ottawa Book Award and was a finalist for the 2009 Rogers Writers' Trust Fiction Prize.

His book This Great Escape: The Case of Michael Paryla (Biblioasis, 2013), is a biography of his cousin, who escaped Nazi Germany but later had a small role as a Nazi guard in the film The Great Escape. Paryla was a struggling bit-part actor who eventually died in suspicious circumstances back in Germany. It was a finalist for the 2013 Hilary Weston Writers' Trust Prize for Nonfiction.

He is the founding editor of Esplanade Books, the fiction imprint at Véhicule Press, where he edited works by Christopher Willard, Liam Durcan, Andrew Hood, Jaspreet Singh, David Manicom, Don LePan, Lolette Kuby, Missy Marston, among others.

== Works ==
=== Prose ===
- Wardlife: The Apprenticeship of a Young Writer as a Hospital Clerk. Véhicule Press. 1999.
- Eva's Threepenny Theatre. Gaspereau Press. 2008.
- This Great Escape. Biblioasis. 2013.

=== Poetry ===
- Histories. Véhicule Press, 2000.
- Hurt Thyself. McGill-Queen's University Press, 2005.

=== Music ===
- Into the Ground, with Weather Permitting, on VOT Records. 1987
- Code of Life, with Weather Permitting, on AMOK Records. 1989
- Port Bou, with Good Cookies, on Eat 'Em Alive Records. 1990
- Bois Bwa Buoa, with Good Cookies, on Eat 'Em Alive Records. 1991
- Have You Fire?, with Good Cookies, on Derivative Records. 1993
