= Bruce Taylor =

Bruce Taylor may refer to:

- Bruce Taylor (Australian cricketer) (1924–1984), Australian cricketer
- Bruce Taylor (New Zealand cricketer) (1943–2021), New Zealand cricketer
- Bruce Taylor (American football) (born 1948), American football player
- Bruce Taylor (poet) (born 1960), Canadian poet
- Bruce Taylor (baseball) (born 1953), former Major League Baseball pitcher
- Bruce Taylor, American businessman, founder and CEO of Taylor Farms
