= Gwen Aube =

Canadian poet

Gwen Aube is a Canadian poet, originally from Windsor, Ontario, and currently based in Montreal, Quebec.

After graduating from high school, Aube participated in Windsor's arts scene as an open mic poet, and published the poetry chapbook Pulp Necrosis (2025, above/ground press). At a poetry reading at Windsor's Phog Lounge, she was discovered by Casey Plett, who published Aube's debut poetry collection, Missed Connections with Tall Girls, in 2026 through her publishing house LittlePuss Press.

The book was shortlisted for the 2026 Dayne Ogilvie Prize for debut books by LGBTQ writers, and the 2026 A.M. Klein Prize for Poetry for the best verse collection by a Montreal writer.

In Montreal, Aube also became co-editor of Maybe Mag with Simina Banu, and an editor-at-large with Discordia Review Press.
