= Susan Gillis =

Canadian poet and editor

Susan Gillis is a Canadian poet and editor.

Her collections of poetry include Swimming Among the Ruins, shortlisted for the Pat Lowther Memorial Award and the ReLit Award; Volta, winner of the Quebec Writers' Federation A.M. Klein Prize for Poetry; The Rapids, a finalist for the Quebec Writers' Federation A.M. Klein Prize for Poetry, and Yellow Crane, a Jury Selection in the Grand prix du livre de Montreal and a finalist for the ASLE Creative Writing Book Award.

Arc Poetry Magazine has called Gillis "a formidable poet." In her review of Yellow Crane, Laura Ritland writes that "Gillis's poetry stands between the making of meaning (its "construction") and the unravelling or uncertainty of stable meaning (its "debris")."

Gillis is a founding member of the collaborative renku poetry collective Yoko's Dogs, with poets Jan Conn, Mary di Michele and Jane Munro. As host/curator of Concrete & River, she has interviewed and published the work of poets Gjertrud Schnackenberg, Mary Jo Salter, Sue Goyette, Sadiqa de Meijer, Sarah Venart, and many others. With di Michele, Gillis curates the online micro-poetry journal HALIBUT. She taught in the Department of English at John Abbott College in Sainte-Anne-de-Bellevue, Quebec, from 2002 until 2019. She continues to work as a freelance editor and mentor.

Born in Halifax, Nova Scotia, Gillis lived in Victoria, British Columbia until 2019. Then she divided her time between Montreal, Quebec and (until 2006) Corner Brook, NL and (from 2007) the country near Perth, Ontario, where she lives with her husband, the poet and novelist John Steffler.

== Bibliography ==
- Swimming Among the Ruins (Signature Editions, 2000)
- Volta (Signature Editions, 2002)
- Twenty Views of the Lachine Rapids(Gaspereau Press, 2012)
- The Rapids (Brick Books, 2012)
- Obelisk (Gaspereau Press, 2017)
- Yellow Crane (Brick Books, 2018)
- Whisk (with Yoko's Dogs; Pedlar Press, 2013)
- Rhinoceros(with Yoko's Dogs; Gaspereau Press, 2016)
