= Misha Solomon =

Canadian poet

Misha Solomon is a Canadian poet from Montreal, Quebec, whose debut poetry collection My Great-Grandfather Danced Ballet was published in 2026.

The book was the winner of the 2026 Dayne Ogilvie Prize for debut books by LGBTQ2S+ writers and the 2026 A. M. Klein Prize for Poetry, as well as a Jury Selection for the 2026 Grand Prix du livre de Montréal.
