= Milo: Sticky Notes and Brain Freeze =

2011 novel by Alan Silberberg

- Author: Alan Silberberg
- Language: English
- Publication date: July 26, 2011
- Media type: Print
- Awards: QWFA for Children's and Young Adult Literature; Sid Fleischman Humor Award

Milo: Sticky Notes and Brain Freeze is a children's novel written by Alan Silberberg, released on July 26, 2011. It won the 2011 QWF Literary Award for Children's and Young Adult Literature and the 2011 Sid Fleischman Humor Award, which is overseen by the Society of Children's Book Writers and Illustrators.

== Plot ==
Milo Cruikshank, a 13-year-old boy who has been struggling ever since his mother died, moves in a new home and meets many new people. He also falls in love with a girl named Summer Goodman and befriends Marshall Hickler, Hillary Alpert, and Sylvia Poole.

== Characters ==
- Milo Cruikshank, The main character.
- Hillary Alpert, One of Milo's friends.
- Marshall Hickler "The One-Eyed Jack" , Another one of Milo's friends.
- Summer Goodman, The girl that Milo has a crush on.
- Milo's Dad, Milo's father, he suffers from depression since his wife died.
- Milo's Sister, The sibling of Milo.
- Milo's Mom, Milo's late mother who died of a [brain tumor].
- Dabney St. Claire, a character Milo created that guides him.
- Sylvia Poole, an old woman.
- Paul Poole Sylvia's husband that died. ( The book does not state why, exactly )
