= Jason Camlot =

Canadian poet, scholar and songwriter

Jason Camlot (born 1967) is a Canadian poet, scholar and songwriter. His first collection of poems, The Animal Library was nominated for the 2000 A. M. Klein Prize for Poetry, and his co-edited collection of essays, Language Acts: Anglo-Québec Poetry, 1976 to the 21st Century was nominated for the 2007 Gabrielle Roy Prize. He teaches literature in the Department of English at Concordia University, Montreal, Quebec, and edits the Punchy Writers poetry imprint for DC Books. His scholarly research has focused on the history of literary style, and on spoken and literary sound recordings.

== Publications ==
=== Poetry ===
The Animal Library (Livres DC Books, 2000)
Attention All Typewriters (Livres DC Books, 2005)
The Debaucher (Insomniac Press, 2008)
What The World Said (Mansfield Press, 2013)
Vlarf (McGill-Queen's University Press, 2021)

=== Chapbooks ===
Lines Crossed Out [with artwork by Betty Goodwin] (Delirium Press, 2005)
The Fruit Man and Other Poems [with artwork by J.R. Carpenter (WithWords Press, 2008)
Rules for Sadness ([Vallum Chapbook Series], 2012)

=== Criticism ===
Language Acts: Anglo-Québec Poetry, 1976 to the 21st Century [edited with Todd Swift] (Véhicule Press, 2007)
Style and the Nineteenth-Century British Critic: Sincere Mannerisms (Ashgate Publishing, 2008)
Phonopoetics: The Making of Early Literary Recordings (Stanford University Press, 2019)
CanLit Across Media: Unarchiving the Literary Event [co-edited with Katherine McLeod] (McGill-Queens University Press, 2019)
Unpacking the Personal Library: The Public and Private Life of Books [co-edited with Jeffrey Weingarten] (Wilfrid Laurier University Press, 2022)
Collection Thinking: Within and Without Libraries, Archives and Museums [co-edited with Martha Lanford and Linda M. Morra] (Routledge, 2022)

=== Recordings ===
O Glee (Urban Myth Recordings)
Mr. Fedora (Urban Myth Recordings)
JC SPED (Independent)
Instantaneous Personal Magnetism (Independent)
Songs For Adam (Independent)
