= Edeet Ravel =

Israeli-Canadian novelist

Edeet Ravel is a Canadian novelist who lives in Montreal, Quebec, Canada.

== Bibliography ==
- 2003 Ten Thousand Lovers
- 2004 Look for Me
- 2005 A Wall of Light
- 2007 The Thrilling Life of Pauline de Lammermoor
- 2007 The Mysterious Adventures of Pauline Bovary
- 2007 The Secret Journey of Pauline Siddhartha
- 2008 The Saver
- 2008 Your Sad Eyes and Unforgettable Mouth
- 2011 Held
- 2011 The Last Rain
- 2012 The Cat
- 2017 A Boy Is Not a Bird
- 2020 A Boy Is Not a Ghost

== Awards ==
- Norma Epstein National Fiction Award (Lovers A Midrash)
- Governor General's Award Finalist (Ten Thousand Lovers)
- Koret Jewish Book Award Finalist (Ten Thousand Lovers)
- Quebec Writers Federation Award Finalist (Ten Thousand Lovers)
- Hugh MacLennan Prize for Fiction (Look For Me)
- Scotiabank Giller Prize Finalist (A Wall of Light)
- Canada & The Caribbean Commonwealth Writers' Prize Finalist (A Wall of Light)
- Canadian Jewish Book Award (A Wall of Light)
- J.I. Segal Award (A Wall of Light)
- Canadian Children's Bookclub Choice (Pauline Series, The Saver)
- 2012 Popular Paperback for Young Adults, ALA (Held)
- Best Bets List, Ontario Library Association (Held)
- YA Top Forty Fiction Titles, Pennsylvania School Librarians Association (Held)
- Best Books for Kids & Teens 2012, Canadian Children's Book Centre (Held)
- Next Generation Indie Book Award finalist (Held)
- Young Adult Book of the Year finalist, Canadian Library Association (Held)
- Arthur Ellis Award finalist (Held)
- John Spray Mystery Award finalist (Held)
- Snow Willow Award 2012 (Held)
- Evergreen Award nominee 2014 (The Cat)
- Canadian Jewish Literary Award (A Boy Is Not a Bird)
- Silver Birch Award finalist (A Boy Is Not a Bird)
- Vine Award for Canadian Jewish Literature finalist (A Boy Is Not a Bird)
- Junior Library Guild Book Club Selection (A Boy Is Not a Bird)
- AJL Sydney Taylor Book Award Notable Book (A Boy Is Not a Ghost)
- Governor General's Award Finalist (A Boy Is Not a Ghost)
