= Elaine Kalman Naves =

Hungarian-born Canadian writer, journalist, editor and lecturer

- Born: 1947 (age 78–79); Hungary
- Occupations: Writer, journalist, editor and lecturer
- Writing career
- Language: English

Elaine Kalman Naves (born 1947) is a Hungarian-born Canadian writer, journalist, editor and lecturer from Quebec.

She has twice won the Quebec Writers' Federation Awards Mavis Gallant Prize for Non-Fiction, in 1999 for Putting Down Roots and in 2003 for Shoshanna's Story. Her 2015 novel The Book of Faith was on the long list in 2016 for The Leacock Award.

== Biography ==
Naves was born in Hungary in 1947, though her family moved to England in the wake of the Revolution of 1956. They eventually immigrated to Canada.

Naves attended McGill University, where she studied history, as well as Bishop's University, where she studied education. Following graduation from each, she taught English and History at the secondary level, then served as a historian for the Centre d’Étude du Québec of Sir George Williams University.

== Awards and honours ==
Montreal Gazette named Shoshanna's Story one of the best books of 2003.

Awards for Naves's writing
Year	Title	Award	Result	Ref.
1997	Journey to Vaja	Mavis Gallant Prize for Non-Fiction	Shortlist	
1998	Journey to Vaja	Elie Wiesel Prize for Holocaust Literature	Winner	
1999	Putting Down Roots	Mavis Gallant Prize for Non-Fiction	Winner	
2003	Shoshanna's Story	Mavis Gallant Prize for Non-Fiction	Winner	
2005	Shoshanna's Story	Yad Vashem Prize	Winner	

== Publications ==
- Journey to Vaja: Reconstructing the World of a Hungarian-Jewish Family (1996, McGill-Queen's University Press, ISBN 9780773515345)
- Putting Down Roots, Montreal's Immigrant Writers (1998, Véhicule Press, ISBN 9781550651034)
- Storied Streets: Montreal in the Literary Imagination, with Bryan Demchinsky (2000, Macfarlane Walter & Ross, ISBN 9781551990446)
- Shoshanna's Story: A Mother, Daughter, and the Shadows of History (2003, McClelland & Stewart, ISBN 9780771067907)
- Robert Weaver: Godfather of Canadian Literature (2008, Véhicule Press, ISBN 9781550652338)
- Portrait of a Scandal: The Trial of Robert Notman (2014, Véhicule Press, ISBN 9781550653571)
- The Book of Faith (2015, Linda Leith Publishing, ISBN 1927535743)
- "Shoshanna. Mère et fille dans les ténèbres de l'histoire", traduit par Chantal Ringuet, Éditions Alias, Groupe Nota Bene, 2017.
