= T. F. Rigelhof =

Canadian writer and academic (born 1944)

Terrence Frederick "Terry" (T. F.) Rigelhof (born April 24, 1944) is a Canadian writer and academic. He is best known for A Blue Boy in a Black Dress, his memoir of his time studying at a Roman Catholic seminary school prior to abandoning the priesthood; the book was a shortlisted finalist for the Governor General's Award for English-language non-fiction at the 1996 Governor General's Awards, and won the Mavis Gallant Prize for Non-Fiction at the Quebec Writers' Federation Awards.

Originally from Regina, Saskatchewan, Rigelhof joined the seminary in the 1960s. He left those studies after a crisis of faith which left him suicidal, but retained an academic interest in the history and sociology of religion, becoming a longtime instructor at Montreal's Dawson College. He published the novel The Education of J.J. Pass (1983) and the short story collection Je t'aime, Cowboy (1993) prior to writing A Blue Boy in a Black Dress; he published one further novel, Badass on a Softail, in 1997 before concentrating on non-fiction writing thereafter. In addition to his books, he was a regular literary critic for The Globe and Mail and other publications.

His later non-fiction works included the Canadian literature studies This Is Our Writing (2000) and Hooked on Canadian Books: The Good, the Better, and the Best Canadian Novels Since 1984 (2010); the George Grant biography George Grant: Redefining Canada (2001); and a second memoir, Nothing Sacred: A Journey Beyond Belief (2004).
