= Carolyn Marie Souaid =

Canadian poet, educator, publisher and editor

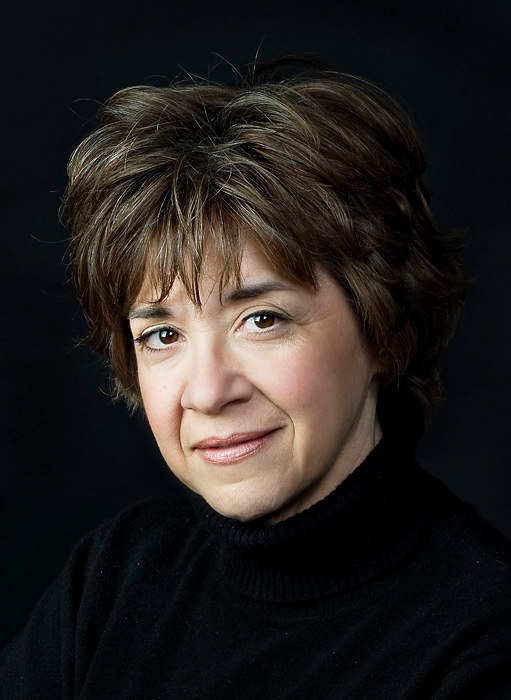
- Photograph taken in 2010 by Monique Dykstra
- Born: August 1, 1959; Montreal, Quebec, Canada
- Education: McGill University, Concordia University
- Occupations: Writer, editor, educator
- Writing career
- Language: English, French
- Genre: poetry

Carolyn Marie Souaid (born 1 August 1959) is a Canadian poet, educator, publisher and editor.

== Biography ==
Born and raised in Montreal, Quebec, she studied at McGill University, where she received a Bachelor of Arts degree in English Literature (1981) and a diploma in Education (1983), and at Concordia University, where she earned a Master of Arts in Creative Writing (1995). Her first poetry collection, Swimming into the Light, won the David McKeen Award for Poetry in 1996. Her books have been nominated for a number of literary awards in Canada, including the A.M. Klein Prize for Poetry and the Pat Lowther Award.

Souaid's work focuses on pivotal moments in Québécois history and on the difficult bridging of worlds (English/French; native/non-native). In 2010, she and longtime poetic collaborator Endre Farkas produced Blood is Blood, a controversial video-poem dealing with the ongoing conflict in the Middle East.

Well known for her activism on the Montreal literary scene, Souaid co-produced Poetry in Motion in 2004 (which brought poems to Montreal buses) and Circus of Words / Cirque des mots, a multidisciplinary, multilingual cabaret showcasing the "theatre" of poetry. In 2009, she co-founded Poetry Quebec, an online review dedicated to the English language poetry and poets of Quebec. From 2008 to 2011, she served as poetry editor for Signature Editions, one of Canada's top publishers of poetry.

Souaid has lived most of her life in Montreal, except for three years spent teaching in Inuit villages along Quebec's Hudson-Ungava coast in the early 1980s.

== Selected works ==
=== Poetry ===
- Swimming into the Light. Nuage Editions, 1995. ISBN 0-921833-43-1
- October. Nuage Editions, 1999. ISBN 0-921833-67-9
- Snow Formations. Signature Editions, 2002. ISBN 0-921833-85-7
- Satie’s Sad Piano. Signature Editions, 2005. ISBN 1-897109-01-6
- Flight. Rubicon Press, 2007. ISBN 978-0-9781616-4-4
- Paper Oranges. Signature Editions, 2008. ISBN 1-897109-31-8
- Blood is Blood. Signature Editions, 2010. ISBN 1-897109-46-6
- This World We Invented. Brick Books, 2015. ISBN 1771313544
- The Eleventh Hour. Ekstasis Editions, 2020. ISBN 9781771714006
- This Side of Light: Selected Poems (1995-2020). Signature Editions, 2022. ISBN 9781773241173

=== Fiction ===
- Yasmeen Haddad Loves Joanasi Maqaittik. Baraka Books, 2017. ISBN 978-1-77186-124-3
- Looking for Her. Baraka Books, 2024. ISBN 978-1-77186-348-3

=== Editor (selected publications) ===
- Freedom: Anthology of Canadian Poets for Turkish Resistance. Poetas.com, 2006. ISBN 1-894879-12-0
- Quotidian Fever: New and Selected Poems of Endre Farkas 1974-2004. The Muses’ Company, 2007. ISBN 1-897289-21-9
- Language Matters: Interviews With 22 Quebec Poets. Signature Editions, 2013. ISBN 978-1927426-19-7

== Critical reception ==
Carolyn Marie Souaid's fourth collection of poetry, Satie's Sad Piano… is a fine achievement in attempting to explain the importance of Pierre Elliott Trudeau - and his passing, five years ago - for the national imagination. … This long poem is perhaps the first serious effort to encompass the nation since Dennie Lee's problematically Ontario centric/Torontonian Civil Elegies appeared in 1868 and 1972

— George Elliott Clarke, The Chronicle Herald
