= Kenneth Radu =

Canadian writer (born 1945)

- Born: 1945 (age 80–81); Windsor, Ontario, Canada
- Occupations: novelist, poet, short story writer
- Writing career
- Period: 1980s-2000s
- Notable works: The Cost of Living, Distant Relations, A Private Performance

Kenneth Radu is a Canadian writer. He was a shortlisted nominee for the Governor General's Award for English-language fiction at the 1988 Governor General's Awards for his short story collection The Cost of Living.

Originally from Windsor, Ontario, he resided in Quebec as an adult, where he taught at John Abbott College in Montreal.

He was a shortlisted nominee for the Books in Canada First Novel Award in 1989 for Distant Relations, and has won the Hugh Maclennan Prize for Fiction in 1989 for Distant Relations and in 1991 for A Private Performance.

He has also served as co-editor of Matrix, a literary magazine devoted to English-language writing in Montreal. He wrote the afterword for the New Canadian Library edition of Yves Beauchemin's novel The Alley Cat.

== Works ==
=== Novels ===
- Distant Relations (1989)
- Home Fires (1992)
- Strange and Familiar Places (1999)
- Flesh and Blood (2001)
- Purest of Human Pleasures (2004)

=== Short stories ===
- The Cost of Living (1987)
- A Private Performance (1990)
- Snow Over Judaea (1994)
- Sex in Russia (2010)
- net worth (2018)

=== Poetry ===
- Letter to a Distant Father (1987)
- Treading Water (1992)
- Romanian Suite (1996)

=== Memoir ===
- The Devil Is Clever: A Memoir of My Romanian Mother (2004)
