= Robyn Sarah =

Canadian poet and short story writer (born 1949)

- Born: 1949 (age 76–77); New York City, New York, United States
- Occupation: writer
- Writing career
- Genres: poetry, short stories

Robyn Sarah (born 1949, in New York City) is a Canadian poet and short story writer.

Raised in Montreal, Quebec, she was educated at McGill University and the Conservatoire de musique du Québec. She has published several volumes of poetry and short stories, and one book of essays. In addition to her writing, she has taught English literature at Champlain Regional College, and has served as a poetry editor for Cormorant Books and Porcupine's Quill.

She won a CBC Literary Award for poetry in 1990, and a National Magazine Award in 1994 for her short story "Accept My Story". Her short story collection Promise of Shelter was a shortlisted nominee for the Quebec Writers' Federation Awards in 1998, and her poetry collection My Shoes Are Killing Me won the Governor General's Award for English-language poetry in 2015.

== Works ==
=== Poetry ===
- The Space Between Sleep and Waking (1981)
- Anyone Skating on That Middle Ground (1984)
- Becoming Light (1987), ISBN 9780920953228
- The Touchstone: Poems New and Selected (1992), ISBN 9780887845284
- Questions about the Stars (1998)
- A Day's Grace (2003), ISBN 978-0-88984-233-5
- Pause for Breath (2009), ISBN 978-1-926845-82-1
- My Shoes Are Killing Me (2015), ISBN 978-1-77196-014-4

=== Short stories ===
- A Nice Gazebo (1992)
- Promise of Shelter (1997)

=== Essays ===
- Little Eurekas: A Decade's Thoughts on Poetry (2007)
