= Susan Elmslie =

Canadian poet living in Montreal, Quebec

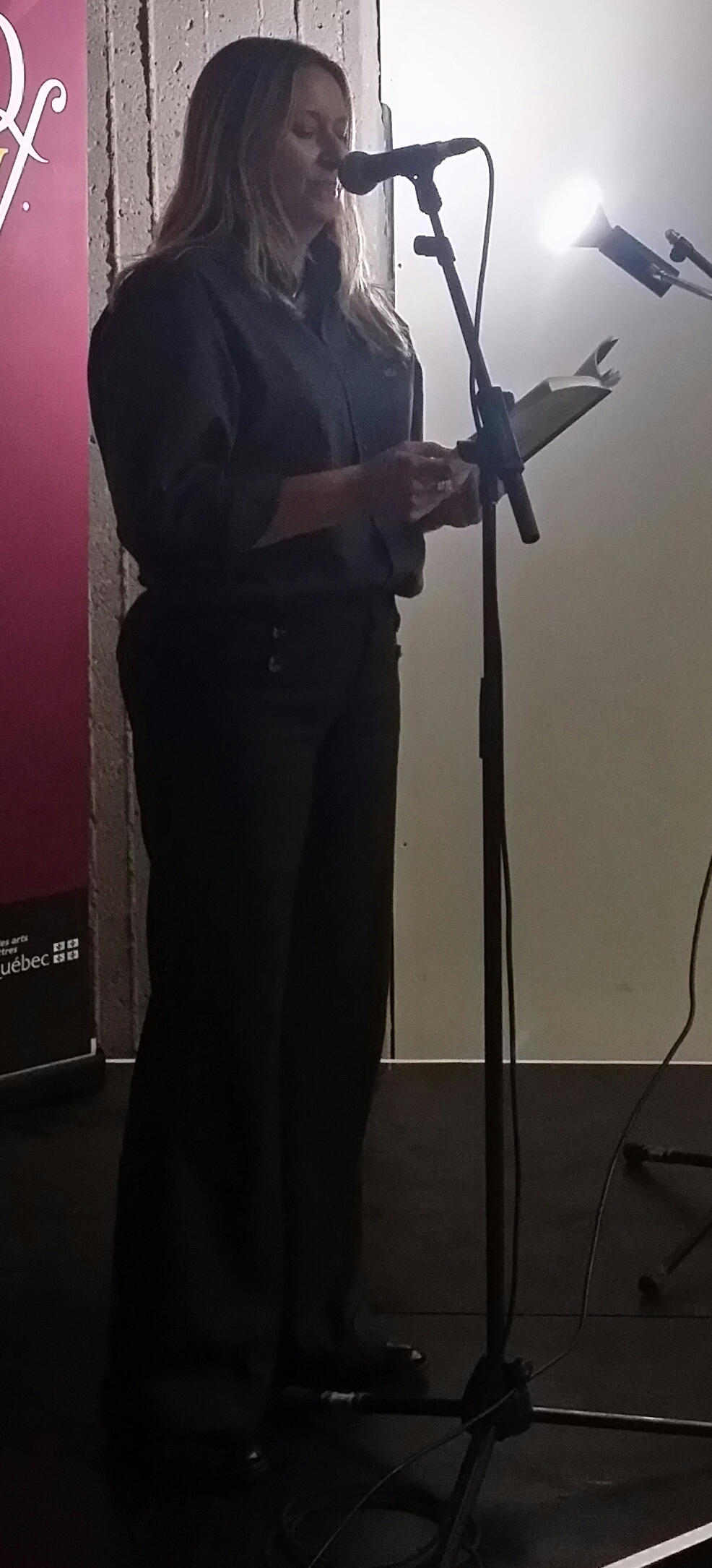
Susan Elsmlie photographed photographed in Montréal, Québec, Canada at the Salon su livre de Montréal 2018.

Susan Elmslie is a Canadian poet and English professor at Dawson College in Montreal, Quebec.

== Education ==
She holds a B.A. (Hon) in English and French Language and Literature (1991; Alumni Gold Medal) as well as an M.A. in Canadian Literature (1993) from the University of Western Ontario and a PhD in English with specialization in Canadian literature and a minor in American literature from McGill University (2000).

== Career ==
In 2006, Elmslie's poetry collection I, Nadja, and Other Poems was a finalist for the Pat Lowther Memorial Award, for the Quebec Writers' Federation McAuslan First Book Prize, and was the winner of the A.M. Klein Prize for Poetry. The Klein Prize jurors praised Elmslie's poems for their sonorous quality, for her skillful use of "rhythm, off-rhyme, rhyme," and called her poems "rich in texture, dense in imagery, dazzling in diction and direction." Elmslie was also a finalist for the 2007 ReLit Award for poetry. An essay in which Elmslie chronicles her inspiration and process for writing the Nadja poems that form the centre of her collection was commissioned by rob mclennan, who first published a small above/ground press chapbook of Elmslie's poems about Nadja for National Poetry Month in 2000. "Trailing Nadja: On Writing I Nadja, and Other Poems" was published online in the third issue of Poetics.ca and is now archived at the ottawater.com website.

Elmslie's poem "Box" was selected in 2008 as the first-prize winner of the Arc Poetry Magazine Poem of the Year contest. The contest's judge, Canadian Parliamentary Poet Laureate John Steffler, "was impressed by the poem's theatrical motif and describe[d] the poem as 'risky and complex, both in its insights and in composition'."

Elmslie's poetry collection Museum of Kindness (Brick Books, 2017), which is opened by "Box," was a finalist for the 2018 Quebec Writers' Federation A.M. Klein Prize for Poetry and was shortlisted for the 2018 League of Canadian Poets’ Pat Lowther Memorial Award. On December 7, 2017, Museum of Kindness was featured on Michael Dennis's Today's Book of Poetry Blog, where Dennis called the collection "a landmark title for Elmslie," "very, very good [...] stratified and rare air stuff." Museum of Kindness was the subject of a feature review by Abby Paige in the Spring 2018 issue of the Montreal Review of Books. Rob Mclennan's interview with the poet, "Some Poems Sing Through Us: An Interview with Susan Elmslie" appears in the Ploughshares Blog.

Elmslie has had poems appear in a number of anthologies including in Alongside We Travel: Contemporary Poets on Autism (New York Quarterly Books, 2019), Veils, Halos, and Shackles: International Poetry on the Oppression and Empowerment of Women (Kasva Press, Israel), Desperately Seeking Susans (Oolican, 2012), The Bright Well: Contemporary Canadian Poems about Facing Cancer (Leaf Press, 2011), The Shape of Content: Creative Writing in Mathematics and Science (A. K. Peters, 2008), In Fine Form: The Canadian Book of Form Poetry (Raincoast, 2005), Evergreen: Six New Poets (Black Moss, 2002), You & Your Bright Ideas: New Montreal Writing (Véhicule, 2001), Best Canadian Poetry (2008, 2015) and The Best of the Best Canadian Poetry in English, Tenth Anniversary Edition (2017).

Elmslie has been invited to read at a number of Canadian and American literary and poetry festivals and events, including the Poetry Earth Reading Series (Victoria, BC), the Massachusetts Poetry Festival (Salem, MA), the gritLit Literary Festival (Hamilton, ON), Bookfest Windsor, the Burlington Book Festival (Burlington, VT), and twice at the Trois Rivières International Poetry Festival (2007, 2020). Her reading for the Burlington Book Festival was recorded, televised and archived at the Regional Educational Television Network (RETN). Elmslie was invited to give two gala performances of her poems translated into French (by Christine Balta) for Guy Cloutier's curated series Les Poètes de l'Amérique Française, and to read as part of the Writers' Series at the Morrin Centre in Quebec City.

Elmslie has been a Hawthornden Poetry Fellow at Hawthornden Castle in Midlothian Scotland. In 2020, she served as a juror for the Montreal International Poetry Prize.

== Published works ==
- When Your Body Takes to Trembling (Cranberry Tree, Windsor, 1997) (chapbook)
- I, Nadja, and Other Poems (Brick Books, 2006)
- Museum of Kindness (Brick Books, 2017)
