= Susan Doherty =

Canadian writer

- Born: October 1957 (age 68–69); Montreal, Quebec
- Education: Concordia University (BSc); Toronto Metropolitan University; University of Toronto; Humber Polytechnic (GCert)
- Occupations: Writer, speaker, educator, novelist

Susan Doherty (born 1957) is a Canadian author, speaker, and educator known for her work in fiction and creative non-fiction. She has written three books that explore themes of trauma, resilience, and mental illness. Her work has been featured in The Montreal Review of Books, The Globe and Mail, Toronto Sun, Calgary Herald, and Maclean's.

== Early career ==
Educated at Concordia University and the University of Toronto, Susan Doherty worked at Maclean's and Atex France before running her own advertising production company for 20 years.

== Work ==
Doherty's debut novel, A Secret Music was published by Cormorant Books in 2015 and won the 2016 Word Guild Grace Irwin Prize, Canada's largest literary award for Christian writers. Set in Depression-era Montreal, the novel tells the story of a young pianist grappling with family expectations and personal challenges.

Her second book, The Ghost Garden: Inside the Lives of Schizophrenia’s Feared and Forgotten, was published by Penguin Random House Canada in 2019 and won the Quebec Writers’ Federation’s 2019 Mavis Gallant Prize for Non-Fiction. The book was praised in Maclean's, Toronto Sun, and The Globe and Mail for its insights into the lives of adults living with schizophrenia.

Doherty's third book, Monday Rent Boy, was published in 2024 by Penguin Random House Canada and was a finalist for the 2024 Paragraphe Hugh MacLennan Prize for Fiction. The novel explores the lives of two young men dealing with the aftermath of trauma and abuse.

== Other work ==
In addition to her writing, Doherty has been a volunteer at the Douglas Mental Health University Institute, the psychiatric teaching hospital affiliated with McGill University. She has taught creative writing to patients both at the hospital and in supervised group homes.

== Bibliography ==
- A Secret Music (Cormorant Books, 2015)
- The Ghost Garden: Inside the Lives of Schizophrenia's Feared and Forgotten (Penguin Random House Canada, 2019)
- Monday Rent Boy (Penguin Random House Canada, 2024)

== Awards ==
- Winner, 2016 Word Guild Grace Irwin Prize for A Secret Music
- Winner, 2019 Mavis Gallant Prize for Non-Fiction for The Ghost Garden: Inside the Lives of Schizophrenia’s Feared and Forgotten
