= Kate Sterns =

Canadian writer

Kate Sterns is a Canadian writer.

== Biography ==
Born in Toronto, Ontario, she now lives in Montreal, Quebec. She credits Grace Paley and Anton Chekhov as early influences.

Her first novel, Thinking About Magritte, has been described as a "pool of brightly tinted cartoon images," and centred on Midnight Cowboy, who lives in Limestone, and whose fantasies about his dead mother bring her back to life. Her second novel, Down There By The Train, featured a hero named Levon Hawke recovering from the tragic death of his younger sister. It was a finalist for the Quebec Writers' Federation Hugh MacLennan Prize for Fiction in 2001.

Her radio plays The Bagel Philosopher and Once in a Blue Moon were broadcast on BBC Radio 4.

She is an assistant professor of Creative Writing at Concordia University.
