= Monique Polak =

Canadian writer

- Born: May 20, 1960 (age 66)
- Occupation: writer
- Spouses: Chaim Melamed (1979–1985); Michael Shenker (1996– 2014); Guy Rouleau (2024-present)
- Children: Alicia
- Writing career
- Notable awards: Janet Savage Blachford Prize (2009, 2014, 2020)

Monique Polak (born May 20, 1960) is a writer from Montreal, Quebec. She has won the Janet Savage Blachford Prize, formally known as the Quebec Writer's Foundation Prize for Children's and Young Adult Literature, three times: What World is Left (2009), Hate Mail (2014), and Room for One More (2020).

== Personal life and education ==
Polak was born May 20, 1960, in Montreal to Maximilien, a criminal court judge, and Celina, a homemaker, Polak. Celina survived the Holocaust, as did her two brothers and both parents. Maximilien survived the Holocaust because he was a painter in Holland and was forced to do propaganda art for the Nazis. Polak also has a sister named Carolyn.

She married Chaim Melamed December 16, 1979, and the couple have a daughter named Alicia. They divorced in 1985. She married Michael Shenker, a journalist, on June 2, 1996.

Polak received a Bachelor of Arts in English literature from McGill University in 1981, and a Master of Arts in English literature from Concordia University.

Polak is Jewish.

== Career ==
In 1987, Polak began teaching in English and humanities at Marianopolis College, where she has worked since.

She is also a freelance journalist. Her articles appear regularly in The Montreal Gazette and other Postmedia newspapers across the country. Several of her feature stories have also been published in Maclean's Magazine.

In 2015, Polak was named the inaugural CBC/QWF Montreal writer-in-residence.

== Awards and honours ==
Awards for Polak's writing
Year	Title	Award	Result	Ref.
2007	All In	Arthur Ellis Award	Winner	
2008	What World Is Left	Booklist Editors' Choice: Books for Youth	Selection	
2009	What World is Left	QWF Prize for Children's and Young Adult Literature	Winner	
2010	The Middle of Everywhere	Janet Savage Blachford Prize	Shortlist	
2012	Pyro	Janet Savage Blachford Prize	Shortlist	
2014	Hate Mail	Janet Savage Blachford Prize	Winner	
2014	Straight Punch	Janet Savage Blachford Prize	Shortlist	
2019	I Am a Feminist: Claiming the F-Word in Turbulent Times	Janet Savage Blachford Prize	Shortlist	
2019	Planet Grief	Ruth and Sylvia Schwartz Children’s Book Award	Shortlist	
2020	Room for One More	Geoffrey Bilson Award for Historical Fiction for Young People	Shortlist	
2020	Room for One More	Janet Savage Blachford Prize	Winner	

== Publications ==
=== Novels ===
- Flip Turn (James Lorimer, 2004)
- No More Pranks (Orca, 2004)
- On the Game (James Lorimer, 2005)
- Home Invasion (Orca, 2005)
- All In (James Lorimer, 2006)
- Finding Elmo (Orca, 2007)
- Scarred (James Lorimer, 2007)
- 121 Express (Orca, 2008)
- What World Is Left (Orca, 2008)
- The Middle of Everywhere (Orca, 2009)
- Junkyard Dog (Orca, 2009)
- Miracleville (Orca, 2011)
- Pyro (Orca, 2012)
- So Much It Hurts (Orca, 2013)
- Straight Punch (Orca, 2014)
- Hate Mail (Orca, 2014)
- Learning the Ropes (Orca, 2015)
- Forensics Squad Unleashed (Orca, 2016)
- Leggings Revolt (Orca 2016)
- Bullies Rule Orca, 2017)
- Princess Angelica, Camp Catastrophe, illustrated by Jane Heinrichs (Orca, 2018)
- Planet Grief (Orca, 2018)
- Princess Angelica, Part-Time Lion Trainer, illustrated by Jane Heinrichs (Orca, 2019)
- The Taste of Rain (Orca, 2019)
- Room for One More (Kar-Ben, 2019)
- Princess Angelica, Junior Reporter, illustrated by Jane Heinrich (Orca, 2020)
- For the Record (Owlkids, 2022)
- Open Science: Knowledge For Everyone (Orca, 2023)

=== Nonfiction ===
- Passover: Festival of Freedom (Orca, 2016)
- I Am a Feminist: Claiming the F-Word in Turbulent Times (Orca, 2019)
- Why Humans Work: How Jobs Shape Our Lives and Our World, illustrated by Suharu Ogawa (Orca, 2022)
- Passover Family (Orca, 2018)
- The Brass Charm, illustrated by Marie Lafrance (Scholastic, 2022)
