= Gillian Sze =

Canadian writer

- Occupation: writer
- Writing career
- Genres: poetry, picture books
- Notable awards: carte blanche Prize (2011), Pat Lowther Award (2023)
- Website: www.gilliansze.com

Gillian Sze is a Canadian writer. She has won one Quebec Writers' Federation Award and been a finalist seven times across four different categories.

== Biography ==
Sze's parents are Chinese immigrants, and she grew up speaking Hokkien at home. She was raised in Winnipeg.

After graduating from high school, Sze studied at the University of Winnipeg for one year to study medicine, after which she transferred to Concordia University to study creative writing. She later received a Master of Arts in creative writing from Concordia University, as well as a Ph.D. in English Studies from the Université de Montréal.

Sze presently lives in Montreal where she teaches in the English Department at Concordia University.

== Awards and honours ==
My Love for You is Always received a starred review from Kirkus Reviews.

The Night is Deep and Wide received a starred review from Publishers Weekly. The book was also named one of the best children's books of the year by New York Public Library (2021) and Carnegie Library of Pittsburgh (2022).

The Globe and Mail included Quiet Night Think: Poems & Essays in their list of the best 100 books of 2022. CBC Books also included in on their "Best Canadian Poetry of 2022" list.

Awards for Sze's writing
Year	Title	Award	Result	Ref.
2009	Fish Bones	McAuslan First Book Prize	Shortlist	
2011	"Like This Together"	carte blanche Prize	Winner	
2014	Peeling Rambutan	A. M. Klein Prize for Poetry	Shortlist	
2016	Redrafting Winter	A. M. Klein Prize for Poetry	Shortlist	
2018	Panicle	A. M. Klein Prize for Poetry	Shortlist	
2022	Quiet Night Think	A. M. Klein Prize for Poetry	Shortlist	
2022	You Are My Favorite Color	Janet Savage Blachford Prize	Shortlist	
2023	Quiet Night Think	Pat Lowther Award	Winner	
2026	An Orange, a Syllable	Purdy Poetry Prize	Longlist	
2026	An Orange, a Syllable	Governor General's Award for English-language poetry	Winner	

== Publications ==
=== Children's books ===
- My Love for You Is Always, illustrated by Michelle Lee (2021, Philomel, ISBN 9780593203071)
- The Night Is Deep and Wide, illustrated by Sue Todd (2021, Orca Books, ISBN 9781459824812)
- You Are My Favorite Color, illustrated by Niña Mata (2022, Philomel, ISBN 9780593203101)
- When Sunlight Tiptoes, illustrated by Soyeon Kim (2023, Orca Book Publishers, ISBN 9781459834507)
- The Little Green Envelope, illustrated by Claudine Crangle (2023, Groundwood)
- I Drew a Heart, illustrated by Naoko Stoop (2023, Little, Brown Books for Young Readers)

=== Poetry ===
- Fish Bones (2009, DC Books, ISBN 9781897190494)
- The Anatomy of Clay (2011, ECW Press, ISBN 9781770410145)
- Peeling Rambutan (2014, Gaspereau Press, ISBN 9781554471331)
- Fricatives (2015, Gaspereau Press, ISBN 9781554471539)
- Redrafting Winter, with Alison Strumberger (2015, BuschekBooks, ISBN 9781894543859)
- Panicle (2017, Misfit Book, ISBN 9781770414051)
- Quiet Night Think: Poems & Essays (2022, Misfit Book, ISBN 9781770416253)
- An Orange, a Syllable (2025)
