= Dimitri Nasrallah =

Lebanese Canadian writer and academic

- Born: 1977 (age 48–49); Lebanon
- Occupations: writer and academic

Dimitri Nasrallah (born 1977) is a Lebanese Canadian writer and academic. He is most noted for his 2022 novel Hotline, which was longlisted for the 2022 Giller Prize.

Born in Lebanon in the early years of the Lebanese Civil War, Nasrallah's family took refuge in Cyprus and Greece before immigrating to Montreal in 1988.

His debut novel, Blackbodying, was published in 2004, and was the winner of the McAuslan First Book Prize from the Quebec Writers' Federation Awards in 2005. His second novel, Niko, was published in 2011, and his third novel, The Bleeds, followed in 2018. His latest book, Hotline, published in 2022, was selected for the 2023 edition of Canada Reads, where it was championed by Gurdeep Pandher.

Nasrallah is also a professor of creative writing at Concordia University, and the chief editor for Esplanade Books, the fiction imprint of Véhicule Press.

== Awards and honours ==
Awards for Nasrallah's writing
Year	Title	Award	Result	Ref.
2005	Blackbodying	McAuslan First Book Prize	Winner	
2005	Blackbodying	Grand Prix du Livre de Montréal	Finalist	
2011	Niko	Paragraphe Hugh MacLennan Prize for Fiction	Winner	
2022	Hotline	CBC Canada Reads	Nominee	
2022	Hotline	Scotiabank Giller Prize	Longlist	
2023	Hotline	ReLit Award for Fiction	Finalist	

== Publications ==
=== As author ===
- Blackbodying (2004, DC Books)
- Niko (2011, Esplanade Books)
- The Bleeds (2018, Véhicule Press)
- Hotline (2022, Esplanade Books)

=== As translator ===
- Hungary-Hollywood Express by Éric Plamondon (2017, Esplanade Books)
- Mayonnaise by Éric Plamondon (2018, Esplanade Books)
