= Kasia Van Schaik =

Canadian writer

Kasia Van Schaik (/ˈkɑːʃə væn ˈskaɪk/) is a Canadian writer, whose debut short story collection We Have Never Lived on Earth was longlisted for the 2023 Giller Prize and the 2023 ReLit Award for short fiction. The book was also a shortlisted finalist for the Concordia University First Book Prize at the 2022 Quebec Writers' Federation Awards.

Van Schaik received a PhD in English literature from McGill University in 2023. Her dissertation, Small dislocations: narrative acts beyond the home in North American women’s fiction post 1945, examined domesticity and the idea of the good life in women's literature of the mid-twentieth century.

Her debut book of cultural criticism and memoir, Women Among Monuments, was published in February 2026. Women Among Monuments explores 20th century histories of female genius, asking what, beyond a room of one’s own, are the necessary conditions for artmaking.

As of 2024, Van Schaik is an assistant professor of English and co-director of the Creative Writing Program at the University of New Brunswick.
