= Byron Rempel =

Canadian writer

- Born: 1962 (age 63–64); Steinbach, Manitoba
- Occupation: novelist
- Writing career
- Period: 1990s–present

Byron Rempel (born 1962) is a Quebec-based writer of Dutch Mennonite-descent born in Steinbach, Manitoba. He has written fiction and non-fiction, including his autobiography Truth is Naked in 2005, which was selected by The Globe and Mail among its 2006 Book of the Year selections. He was a finalist for the Quebec Writers' Federation Awards Mavis Gallant Prize twice, for Truth is Naked in 2006 and No Limits in 2008.

== Bibliography ==
- True Detective (1997)
- Truth is Naked: All Others Pay Cash (2005)
- No Limits (2007)
- Sons and Mothers: Stories From Mennonite Men (2015)
- The Bodice Ripper (2017)
