= Ian McGillis =

Canadian writer and journalist

- Born: March 27, 1962 (age 64); Hull, Quebec
- Occupations: writer, journalist
- Writing career
- Language: English

Ian McGillis (born March 27, 1962, in Hull, Quebec) is a Canadian writer and journalist. He regularly contributes to the Montreal Gazette and previously co-edited the Montreal Review of Books. His works have been shortlisted three times for Quebec Writers' Federation Awards.

== Biography ==
McGillis was born March 27, 1962, in Hull, Quebec. He "grew up in Edmonton, and now lives in Montreal."

McGillis regularly contributes to the Montreal Gazette, as well as other news outlets. Together with Margaret Goldik, he used to co-edit the Montreal Review of Books. His novel A Tourist's Guide to Glengarry concerns a boy's recollections of his last day in the neighborhood of Glengarry, Edmonton before moving away.

== Awards and honours ==
In 2004, McGillis and Margaret Goldik received the Judy Mappin Community Award from the Quebec Writers' Federation "for the professionalism and judgment they brought to their work as co-editors of the Montreal Review of Books."

Awards for McGillis's writing
Year	Title	Award	Result	Ref.
2003	A Tourist’s Guide to Glengarry	McAuslan First Book Prize	Shortlist	
2003	A Tourist’s Guide to Glengarry	Paragraphe Hugh MacLennan Prize for Fiction	Shortlist	
2003	A Tourist’s Guide to Glengarry	Stephen Leacock Memorial Medal for Humour	Shortlist	
2012	"William and Robbie"	carte blanche Prize	Third place	

== Publications ==
- Tourist's Guide to Glengarry (2002, The Porcupine's Quill, ISBN 9780889842465)
- Higher Ground: One Person's Lifelong Relationship with Soul, Reggae and Rap (2015, Biblioasis, ISBN 9781771960489)
