= Elyse Gasco =

Canadian fiction writer (born 1967)

- Born: 1967 (age 58–59); Montreal, Quebec, Canada
- Education: Concordia University; New York University
- Occupation: writer
- Children: two daughters
- Writing career
- Language: English
- Notable awards: Journey Prize

Elyse Gasco (born 1967) is a Canadian fiction writer. She is a recipient of the Journey Prize, QSPELL Hugh MacLennan Prize for Fiction, and the QSPELL/FEWQ First Book Award,

== Biography ==
Born in Montreal, Quebec, Gasco studied Creative Writing first at Concordia University where she received a Bachelor of Arts degree in 1988, then at New York University to earn a Master of Arts degree.

The title story of her 1999 debut collection, Can You Wave Bye Bye, Baby? (1999), won the 1996 Journey Prize. The book won the QSPELL Hugh MacLennan Prize for Fiction, the QSPELL/FEWQ First Book Award, and was shortlisted for a 1999 Governor General's Award, the Rogers Writers' Trust Fiction Prize, the Danuta Gleed Literary Award, and the Pearson Canada Reader's Choice Award. It was also a designated a New York Times Notable Book in 1999.

The collection has since been translated into French by Ivan Steenhout as Bye-bye, bébé (2001). Gasco has also adapted the stories for the stage as Bye Bye Baby.

Gasco's work has appeared in American and Canadian literary magazines, including The Little Magazine, Western Humanities Review, Canadian Fiction Magazine, PRISM international, Grain, and The Malahat Review.

Gasco is married with two daughters and lives in Westmount.

== Selected works ==
- Can You Wave Bye Bye, Baby?. Toronto: McClelland and Stewart, 1999. ISBN 0-7710-3297-8 (translated as Bye-bye, bébé. Montreal: L'Instant même. ISBN 2-89502-143-0)
