= Gillian Clark =

Gillian Clark may refer to:

- Gillian Clark (aid worker) (1956–2003), Canadian aid worker who was killed in the Canal Hotel bombing in Iraq
- Gillian Clark (badminton) (born 1961), English female badminton player
- Gillian Clark (historian), a professor on classics and ancient history

== See also ==
- Gillian Clarke (born 1937), poet
