= Jon Paul Fiorentino =

Canadian writer, editor, and professor

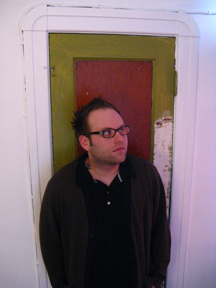

Jon Paul Fiorentino is a Canadian poet, novelist, short story writer, editor, and professor.

Fiorentino was born and raised in the Transcona area of Winnipeg, Manitoba. In his book of poems, Resume Drowning, he wrote that because he has resided in Transcona, Winnipeg, and Montreal, he considers all three to be home. He started writing in Winnipeg and moved to Montreal to pursue a life in writing in 1999.

Fiorentino taught at Concordia University. He was editor-in-chief of Matrix magazine, was poetry editor of Joyland magazine and founded Snare Books, a Canadian publishing company.

== Education ==
Fiorentino studied at the University of Winnipeg until 1998. He then moved to Montreal, Quebec for further studies at Concordia University where he received his Bachelor of Arts in English and Creative Writing (with Honours and Distinction) in 2000. He received his Master of Arts in English Literature and Creative Writing in 2003 at Concordia University.

== Literary contributions ==
"Post-prairie poet" is a termed coined by Fiorentino who, with Robert Kroetsch, edited the collection Post-Prairie: An Anthology of New Poetry (2005). In Faustus Salvador's interview with Fiorentino about his book The Theory of the Loser Class, Salvador asks Fiorentino about the genesis of his book titles. Fiorentino explains, "I always come up with the titles first. It seems to me that more people pay attention to the title than to the actual writing. That may sound cynical, but titles are key to me. I collect the writing with the title and the mandate it suggests in mind."

=== Articles ===
Fiorentino published a number of articles on Huffington Post, National Post, and The Barnstormer. On June 19, 2012, he wrote and published the article "Waiting for Morris Lukowich" in The Barnstormer. Fiorentino has also written a couple of articles for the National Post. On June 19, 2013, Fiorentino wrote "The Rhetoric and Reality of Suicide", and on December 4, 2013, he wrote "The Case for Fixed Book Pricing in Canada".

Fiorentino contributed a number of articles in the Huffington Post. He wrote "You Don't Have to be Adam Lanza's Mother to Make a Statement" on December 18, 2012. His article "Will More Male Athletes Come Out in 2013?" was published on December 26, 2012. On February 18, 2013, he wrote the article "A Film Festival First For Montreal". He wrote "Why Morrissey Still Matters" on March 7, 2013. Fiorentino also wrote "Sexism and Silence in the Literary Community" on May 1, 2013. ON July 17, 2013, he wrote the article "The Case for the Head Case: If You Were the Class Daydreamer, You're Probably a Writer".

=== Stripmalling screenplay ===
Stripmalling is Fiorentino's first graphic novel, which was published in 2009. It is a semi-autobiographical, metafictional novel about an aspiring graphic novelist (named Jonny) who works at a gasoline station and his journey in writing his novel titled Stripmalling. The story is set in Transcona, Winnipeg. Fiorentino wrote the script with Katrina Best. The screenplay was optioned by Farpoint Films but as of March, 2018, Farpoint was no longer listing it among its current projects.

== Teaching ==
Fiorentino taught at Concordia University in Montreal. From 2010 to 2012, he was an Assistant Professor (limited-term appointment) of Poetry, Prose, and Screenwriting within the English Department for Creative Writing from 2010 to 2012. Fiorentino was a part-time faculty member in the Concordia University faculty directory but no longer appeared on the Department of English's faculty member page as of January 2018.

== Investigation for sexual misconduct ==
From 2017 to 2019, Fiorentino was under investigation by the university for sexual misconduct in connection to allegations of widespread sexual misconduct and abuse of power in Concordia's creative writing program. As of October 2019, Fiorentino is no longer employed at Concordia. The University confirms that the investigation is complete and refuses to release details to CBC due to privacy laws.

== Bibliography ==
- Transcona Fragments (Cyclops Press/Signature Editions, 2002)
- Resume Drowning (Broken Jaw Press, 2002)
- Hello Serotonin (Coach House Books, 2004)
- Post-Prairie: An Anthology of New Poetry (Talonbooks, 2005) (edited with Robert Kroetsch)
- Asthmatica (Insomniac Press, 2005)
- The Theory of the Loser Class (Coach House Books, 2006)
- Blues and Bliss: The Poetry of George Elliott Clarke (WLU Press, 2008)
- Stripmalling: a novel (ECW Press, 2009)
- Indexical Elegies (Coach House Books, 2010)
- Needs Improvement (Coach House Books, 2013)
- I'm Not Scared Of You Or Anything (Anvil Press, 2014)
- Leaving Mile End (Anvil Press, 2017)
