= Endre Farkas =

Montreal-based poet

Endre Farkas (born 1948) is a Montreal-based poet, editor and playwright born in Hajdúnánás Hungary in 1948. After the Hungarian Revolution of 1956, he fled to Canada with his parents, who were Holocaust survivors. When he first arrived, his given name Endre was Quebecized to André. During his undergraduate degree at Concordia University he participated in the Sir George Williams affair as an occupant. He then took a few years off to live at an artist commune called Meatball Creek Farm in the Quebec Eastern Townships.

Since the 1970s, he taught literature at John Abbott College in Sainte-Anne-de-Bellevue, Quebec. He retired in 2008. His work has been published in six different languages: French, Spanish, Hungarian, Italian, Slovenian and Turkish. He was a part of the Montreal experimental writing collective, The Vehicule Poets and was a founding editor of Véhicule Press. He later founded the publishing press, The Muses’ Company. He won the Quebec Writers' Federation Community Award in 2011 "for the inclusiveness and power of his vision for Quebec literature," according to QWF spokeswoman Gina Roitman.

He participated in Dial-A-Poem Montreal 1985-1987.

== Publications ==
=== Poetry ===
- Szerbusz. Montreal, QC: DaVinci Press, 1974.
- Murders in the Welcome Café. Montreal QC: Véhicule Press, 1977.
- Romantic at Heart & Other Faults.Montreal, QC: Cross Country Press, 1979.
- From Here to Here, Montreal, Qc: The Muses' Company, 1980.
- Face Off, Ste. Anne de Bellevue, QC: The Muses' Company, 1980
- How To, Dorion, QC: Muses’ Company, 1988.
- Howl Too, Eh? And Other Satires. By Endre Farkas and Ken Norris. Montreal, QC: Nuage Editions, 1991.
- Surviving Words, Ste. Anne de Bellevue, QC: The Muses’ Company, 1994.
- In the Worshipful Company of Skinners. Winnipeg, MB: Muses’ Company, 2003.
- Quotidian Fever: New and Selected Poems, 1974-2007. Winnipeg, MB: Muses’ Company, 2007.
- Blood Is Blood, By Endre Farkas and Carolyn Marie Souaid. Winnipeg, MB: Signature Editions, 2010.

=== Prose ===
- Never, Again, Winnipeg, MB: Signature Editions, 2016.
- Home Game, Winnipeg, MB: Signature Editions, 2019

=== Drama ===
- Surviving Wor(l)ds. Winnipeg, MB: Scirocco Drama, 1999.
- Voices. Dorian, QC: CD Poetry, 2002.

=== Edited ===
- Montreal English Poetry of the Seventies, Endre Farkas and Ken Norris eds. Montreal, QC: Vhicule Press, 1977.
- The Other Language: English Poetry of Montreal, Endre Farkas ed. Dorion, QC: Muses’ Company, 1989.
- Quebec Suite: Poems for and about Quebec, Endre Farkas ed. Ste. Anne de Bellevue, QC: Muses’ Company, 1995.
- The Collected Books of Artie Gold, Endre Farkas and Ken Norris eds. Vancouver, BC: Talonbooks, 2010.
- Language Matters: Interviews with 22 Quebec Poets, Endre Farkas and Carolyn Marie Souaid eds. Winnipeg, MB: Signature Editions, 2013.
