= Mary Soderstrom =

Novelist, short story and nonfiction writer

Mary Soderstrom (born 1942) is a novelist, short story and nonfiction writer, based in Montreal.

== Career ==
Her novel, The Violets of Usambara (Cormorant Books, March 2008), was supported by a grant from the Conseil des arts et des lettres du Québec which allowed her to do research in East Africa. That experience also shows up in her book Green City: People, Nature and Urban Places (Véhicule Press). Tanga, Tanzania, the gateway to the East Usambara Mountains, is one of the eleven cities she uses in Green City as points of departure for discussing the way people have brought nature into cities over history. This travel, as well as what she did for her non-fiction book The Walkable City: From Haussmann's Boulevards to Jane Jacobs' Streets and Beyond (Véhicule Press, 2008) prompted her to consider the role of the Portuguese over the last 700 years in the European exploration of the world. Their story lies at the heart of Making Waves: The Continuing Portuguese Adventure (Véhicule Press, Fall 2010).

The University of Regina Press published her non-fiction chronicle entitled Frenemy Nations: Love and Hate between Neighbo(u)ring States in October 2019. The book was her sixteenth book, and sixth non-fiction work. Four years previously, Cormorant Books published her sixth novel River Music in May 2015. Her third short story collection, Desire Lines: Stories of Love and Geography, was published by Oberon Press in November 2013. It received a starred review in the January–February 2014 Quill and Quire: This collection is not to be missed," writes reviewer Joy Parks.

In 2020, the University of Regina Press published Concrete: From Ancient Origins to a Problematic Future. In 2023, Dundurn Press published a follow-up to Concrete, Against the Seas: Saving Civilizations from Rising Waters. This was followed by Before We Forget: How Remembering Will Get Us Through the Next 75 Years in 2026.

== Bibliography ==
- The Descent of Andrew McPherson, McGraw Hill-Ryerson Press, 1976
- Maybe Tomorrow I'll Have a Good Time, Human Sciences Press, 1982
- Endangered Species, Oberon Press, 1995.
- Finding the Enemy, Oberon Press, 1997.
- The Words on the Wall; Robert Nelson and the Rebellion of 1837, Oberon Press, 1998.
- The Truth Is, Oberon Press, 2000.
- Re-creating Eden: A Natural History of Botanical Gardens, Véhicule Press, 2001.
- After Surfing Ocean Beach, Dundurn, 2004
- Green City: People, Nature and Urban Places, Véhicule Press, 2006
- The Violets of Usambara, Cormorant Books, 2008
- The Walkable City: From Haussmann's Boulevards to Jane Jacob's Streets and Beyond, Véhicule Press, 2008
- Making Waves: The Continuing Portuguese Adventure, Véhicule Press, 2010
- Desire Lines: Stories of Love and Geography, Oberon Press, 2013
- River Music, Cormorant Books, 2013
- Road through Time: The Story of Humanity on the Move, University of Regina Press, 2017
- Frenemy Nations: Love and Hate between Neighbo(u)ring States, University of Regina Press, 2019
- Concrete: From Ancient Origins to a Problematic Future, University of Regina Press, 2020
- Against the Seas: Saving Civilizations from Rising Waters, Dundurn Press, 2023
- Before We Forget: How Remembering Will Get Us Through the Next 75 Years, Dundurn Press, 2026
