= Peter Dubé =

Canadian writer

- Born: Montreal
- Education: Concordia University
- Occupation: writer
- Website: www.peterdube.com

Peter Dubé is a Canadian writer, who has published novels, short stories and essays. Originally from Montreal, he earned an MA from Concordia University's Creative Writing Program.

In addition to his own published work, Dubé has also edited several anthologies of gay male literature.

His 2020 poetry collection The Headless Man was shortlisted for the ReLit Award for poetry in 2021.

== Works ==
- Hovering World ISBN 0-91968-861-6
- At the Bottom of the Sky ISBN 1-89719-019-0
- Subtle Bodies: A Fantasia on Voice, History and Rene Crevel ISBN 1-59021-330-0
- The City's Gates ISBN 1-77086-094-0
- Madder Love: Queer Men and the Precincts of Surrealism (editor) ISBN 0-97908-382-6
- Best Gay Stories 2011 (editor) ISBN 1-59021-227-4
- Best Gay Stories 2012 (editor) ISBN 1-59021-386-6
