= Alexandria Haber =

Canadian playwright and actor

Alexandria Haber is a Canadian playwright and actor. Her plays include Life Here After (winner of the 2009 write-on-Q playwriting competition), I Don’t like Mondays, Four Minutes if You Bleed, Housekeeping & Homewrecking, Ordinary Times, Birthmarks, A Christmas Carol, and Tom Waits. She has written radio plays for CBC Radio including The Very Little Girl (winner of the CBC Radio New Voices Competition) and Washing Day (winner of the CBC Radio Sound FX contest).

== Biography ==
Haber was born in Hamilton, Ontario and moved to Montreal, Quebec at age five. She studied Theatre Performance at Concordia University.

== Selected works ==
=== Plays ===
- Alice and The World We Live In (Second place winner, Write on Q! Playwriting Competition 2016)
- Water Wars
- Mouth to Mouth
- It’s a Wonderful Life
- On This Day
- Game Changers
- Closed for Urgent and Extraordinary Work
- Cross My Heart
- Tom Waits
- Life Here After (Winner of the 2009 Infinithéâtre's Write-on- Q! Playwriting Competition)
- I Don’t Like Mondays
- A Christmas Carol (adapted from the novel by Charles Dickens)
- Housekeeping & Homewrecking (MECCA winner for Best Ensemble Production 2007)
- Ordinary Times
- Dying To See You Again
- The Full Molly (Short listed for the Just for Laughs Best Comedy)
- Housekeeping (Monologue)
- The Farm
- Birthmarks

=== Radio plays ===
- A Grown Girl's Guide to Gladness (CBC Radio)
- The Very Little Girl (CBC Radio)
- Washing Day (CBC Radio)

=== Short stories ===
- Loved
- New Year's Day
- Housekeeping

== Filmography ==
- 19-2 (TV series, 2 episodes)
- Jackie Bouvier Kennedy Onassis (TV mini series)
- Silent Trigger
