= Aimee Wall =

Canadian writer and translator

Aimee Wall is a Canadian writer and translator from Grand Falls-Windsor, Newfoundland and Labrador, whose debut novel We, Jane was longlisted for the 2021 Giller Prize and the 2022 Amazon.ca First Novel Award. We, Jane was translated by Geneviève Robichaud and Danielle LeBlanc and published in French under the title Nous, Jane in October 2024.

She has translated works by Vickie Gendreau, Jean-Philippe Baril Guérard, Maude Veilleux and Alexie Morin. She received a Governor General's Award nomination for French to English translation at the 2024 Governor General's Awards for her translation of Clara Dupuis-Morency's Sadie X.
