= Paige Cooper =

Canadian writer

Paige Cooper is a Canadian writer, originally from Canmore, Alberta and currently based in Montreal, Quebec. Her debut short story collection Zolitude was named as a longlisted nominee for the 2018 Scotiabank Giller Prize, a shortlisted finalist for the Governor General's Award for English-language fiction, a shortlisted finalist for the Paragraphe Hugh MacLennan Prize for Fiction in 2018, and a runner-up for the Danuta Gleed Literary Award. Zolitude won the 2018 Concordia University First Book Prize. A French translation of Zolitude was published by Éditions du Boréal in 2019. The French translation was shortlisted for Le Prix de Traduction de la Fondation Cole in 2020.

The collection derives its title from Zolitūde, an apartment block in Riga, Latvia where a major shopping centre underwent a roof collapse in 2013. The book's stories have been described as speculative fiction.

Her short stories have also appeared in The Fiddlehead, West Branch, Michigan Quarterly Review, Gulf Coast Online, Canadian Notes & Queries, The New Quarterly and the Journey Prize anthology.

In 2019, Paige was voted 3rd best living author in Montreal.

In 2020, she edited a collection of short stories, Best Canadian Stories 2020.

== Bibliography ==
- Zolitude (2018)
- Best Canadian Stories, Editor (2020)
