= Elizabeth Blanchard =

Elizabeth Blanchard may refer to:

- Elizabeth Blanchard (actress) (1799–1849), British-born American stage actress
- Elizabeth Blanchard (educator) (1834–1891), American educator
- Elizabeth Blanchard (New Hampshire politician), American Democratic politician
