= Robyn Maynard =

Canadian writer and academic

Robyn Maynard is a Canadian writer focusing on race and gender-based state violence.

She is most noted for her 2017 book Policing Black Lives: State Violence in Canada from Slavery to the Present, which received praise in some Canadian publications and achieved several awards and nominations. Alongside Leanne Betasamosake Simpson, Maynard also co-authored the 2022 book Rehearsals for Living, which was shortlisted in the 2022 Governor General's Awards. She has also produced scholarly publications on the topic of race and police abolition.

In 2020, she was shortlisted for the Dayne Ogilvie Prize for emerging LGBTQ writers.

== 2025 Publications ==
In October 2025, Feminist Press released several new titles. These included a collaborative anthology between Black Women Radicals and the Asian American Feminist Collective, featuring essays, interviews, and poetry by queer, trans, and people of colour artists. This anthology addresses intersectionality within feminism. Other releases included a revised edition of Policing Black Lives by Robyn Maynard, which explores state violence against Black women in Canada, and We Gon’ Be Alright by Stephanie M. Crumpton, focusing on resistance within queer Black movement spaces. These publications collectively amplify marginalised voices in feminist literature, with a particular emphasis on healing and community activism.
