= Bruce Taylor (poet) =

Canadian poet (born 1960)

Bruce Taylor (born 1960) is a Canadian poet. A graduate of McGill University and the University of Toronto, he lives in Wakefield, Quebec with his family.

== Published works ==
- Getting on with the Era (Villeneuve, 1987)
- Cold Rubber Feet (Cormorant, 1989)

Shortlisted for the 1990 Gerald Lampert Award

- Next Door (Taylor, Bruce. 1998. Next Door kalliope: a Journal of women’s literature and art. http://purl.flvc.org/fscj/fd/Kalliope1998_01. 20(1). Pages (34))

Awards: A. M. Klein Prize for Poetry; Opening poem winner of the E. J. Pratt Medal and Prize for excellence from the University of Toronto.

- Facts (Signal/Vehicle, 1998)

Award: A. M. Klein Prize for Poetry

- No End in Strangeness: New and Selected Poems (Cormorant Books, 2011)
