= Jack Hannan =

Canadian novelist and poet

Jack Hannan is a Canadian novelist and poet living in Montreal, Quebec. He has published two novels, three books of poetry, and four chapbooks. He also edited the M.B.M. Monograph Series (published by Mansfield Book Mart). His work has been circulating in Canadian literary magazines since the 1970s and he participated in Dial-A-Poem Montreal 1985–1987. He stopped writing entirely from 1984 to 2004.[1] Published in 2011, Some Frames was a finalist for the Quebec Writers' Federation’s A.M. Klein Award for poetry. In 2016, his first novel, The Poet is a Radio, was a finalist for the Quebec Writers' Federation’s Hugh MacLennan Award for fiction.

== Publications ==
=== Poetry ===
- Some Frames. Toronto, ON: Cormorant Books, 2011.
- A Rhythm to Stand Beside. Toronto, ON: Cormorant Books, 2013.
- Points North of A. Montreal, QC: Villeneuve Publications, 1980.
- Peeling Oranges in the Shade. Sutton, ON: Paget Press, 1978.

=== Prose ===
- I am the Earth the Plants Grow Through: A Novel. Montreal, QC: Linda Leith Publishing. 2021.
- The Poet Is a Radio: A Novel. Montreal, QC: Linda Leith Publishing. 2016.
