= Klara du Plessis =

South African-Canadian poet

Klara du Plessis is a South African-Canadian poet, who writes in both English and Afrikaans. Her debut poetry collection Ekke won the Pat Lowther Award, and was shortlisted for the Gerald Lampert Award, in 2019. Her second collection, Hell Light Flesh, was released in 2020, shortlisted for the Raymond Souster Award and A.M. Klein Poetry Prize. Other poetry books include: G, published in collaboration with Khashayar "Kess" Mohammadi in 2023, Post-Mortem of the Event, 2024, and a book of literary essays, I'mpossible Collab, 2023.

Du Plessis was born in Montreal, but raised predominantly in Bloemfontein, South Africa. She graduated with a PhD from Montreal's Concordia University. Since 2018, she has been developing Deep Curation, a practice of poetry reading organization that places poets' works in deliberate thematic and conceptual dialogue in performance.
