= Friction-maxxing =

Practice of intentionally choosing less convenient options

Friction-maxxing is the practice of intentionally choosing less convenient options in daily life to build tolerance for discomfort, resist technology-driven ease, and preserve what proponents describe as meaningful human experiences. The term, which utilizes the incelosphere-related suffix "-maxx", was coined by columnist Kathryn Jezer-Morton in a January 2026 essay for The Cut.

== Background ==
Jezer-Morton introduced the term in a piece titled "In 2026, We Are Friction-Maxxing," arguing that technology companies have conditioned people to treat ordinary experiences like boredom, social awkwardness, and effortful thinking as problems to be eliminated. She defined friction-maxxing not as simply reducing screen time but as "building up tolerance for 'inconvenience' (which is usually not inconvenience at all but just the vagaries of being a person living with other people in spaces that are impossible to completely control)." She has said the concept of "friction" stayed with her after a 2025 conversation with journalist Karen Hao, and that the "-maxxing" suffix, derived from incelosphere-slang originating in mid-2010s online communities, came to her while writing.

The essay drew on earlier critiques of convenience culture. Legal scholar Tim Wu argued in a 2018 New York Times essay that society should resist the "tyranny of convenience," characterizing difficulty as a basic feature of human experience. German sociologist Hartmut Rosa's work on "uncontrollability," the idea that meaningful connection with life requires environments partially beyond one's control, has also been cited as an influence.

== Spread and adoption ==
Person taking notes by hand

The concept was picked up across a range of publications within weeks of Jezer-Morton's essay. The Financial Times reported on workers reintroducing friction into professional settings: favoring in-person meetings, reading full documents instead of AI summaries, and writing notes by hand. Gianpiero Petriglieri, a professor of organisational behaviour at INSEAD, told the paper that his students worry convenience will stop them developing judgment: "A little bit like a controlling parent, it makes life easier for you, then you don't know how to manage life on your own." Kester Brewin of the Institute for the Future of Work noted that frictionless job applications had created "a frenetic situation that doesn't serve firms or applicants well."

Raconteur applied the concept to corporate leadership, citing research by the Institute of Labor Economics on automation reducing worker autonomy, and a Microsoft/Carnegie Mellon University study that found workers who trusted generative AI tools exercised less independent critical thinking. The publication also invoked the "IKEA effect," a psychological phenomenon in which people value products more when they have helped create them, as evidence that effort increases engagement.

Harper's Bazaar fashion director Chloe King connected the concept to fashion, arguing that algorithmic recommendations and one-tap purchasing had produced "expansive and numbing sameness" in personal style. She cited Rei Kawakubo and Miuccia Prada as designers whose deliberately challenging work resists easy consumption. Architectural Digest similarly drew parallels with the "slow decorating" movement in interior design.

In Forbes, Kevin Kruse framed friction-maxxing as a form of emotional intelligence training, arguing that the discomfort involved requires the same skills of self-awareness and self-management central to EQ frameworks.

== Criticism ==
The Guardian characterised friction-maxxing as a rebranding of "character-building" and questioned the arbitrariness of drawing a line at current technologies, noting that society has continuously adopted convenience-enhancing inventions for centuries.

André Spicer, executive dean of Bayes Business School, raised equity concerns, telling the Financial Times that friction-maxxing may be available mainly to high-status workers: "We often find people use friction as a way of increasing the difficulty and inconvenience of a task, to create status around it." The paper also noted that a return to in-person, people-powered recruitment could favor privileged applicants and reinforce "who you know" hiring.

== See also ==
- Slow movement (culture)
- Digital detox
- Delayed gratification
- IKEA effect
