= T. Liem =

Canadian poet

Tess Liem is a Canadian poet from Montreal, Quebec, who published their debut poetry collection Obits in 2018. The book was named one of the year's best Canadian poetry collections by CBC Arts, and won the Gerald Lampert Award from the League of Canadian Poets in 2019.

The book was also nominated for a Lambda Literary Award for Lesbian Poetry at the 31st Lambda Literary Awards, and was longlisted for the Pat Lowther Award.

Liem's second collection, Slows: Twice, was published in 2023 by Coach House Books. Reviewing the collection for Montreal Review of Books, Salena Wiener called Slows: Twice "chock-full of versions, inversions, and revisions of the self." The collection as its central image the mirror, which is replicated formally by the second half of the collection being a mirror image of the first. Sylee Gore, for Poetry, praised the book's formal inventiveness as well as its "poised and raw" tone.
