= D. M. Bradford =

Canadian poet

Darby Minott Bradford is a Canadian poet based in Montreal, Quebec, whose debut poetry collection Dream of No One But Myself was published in 2021.

== Biography ==
Bradford completed a BA at Concordia University followed by an MFA at the University of Guelph, where Bradford was mentored by Dionne Brand. Bradford previously published the chapbooks Nell Zink is Damn Free (2017) and The Plot (2018) and was a founding editor of the poetry publisher House House Press.

== Awards ==
Dream of No One But Myself was shortlisted for the 2022 Griffin Poetry Prize, the 2022 Gerald Lampert Award, and the Governor General's Award for English-language poetry at the 2022 Governor General's Awards.

At the 2023 Governor General's Awards, Bradford was nominated for French to English translation for House Within a House, the English translation of Nicholas Dawson's Désormais, ma demeure.
