= Mary di Michele =

Italian-Canadian poet and author (born 1949)

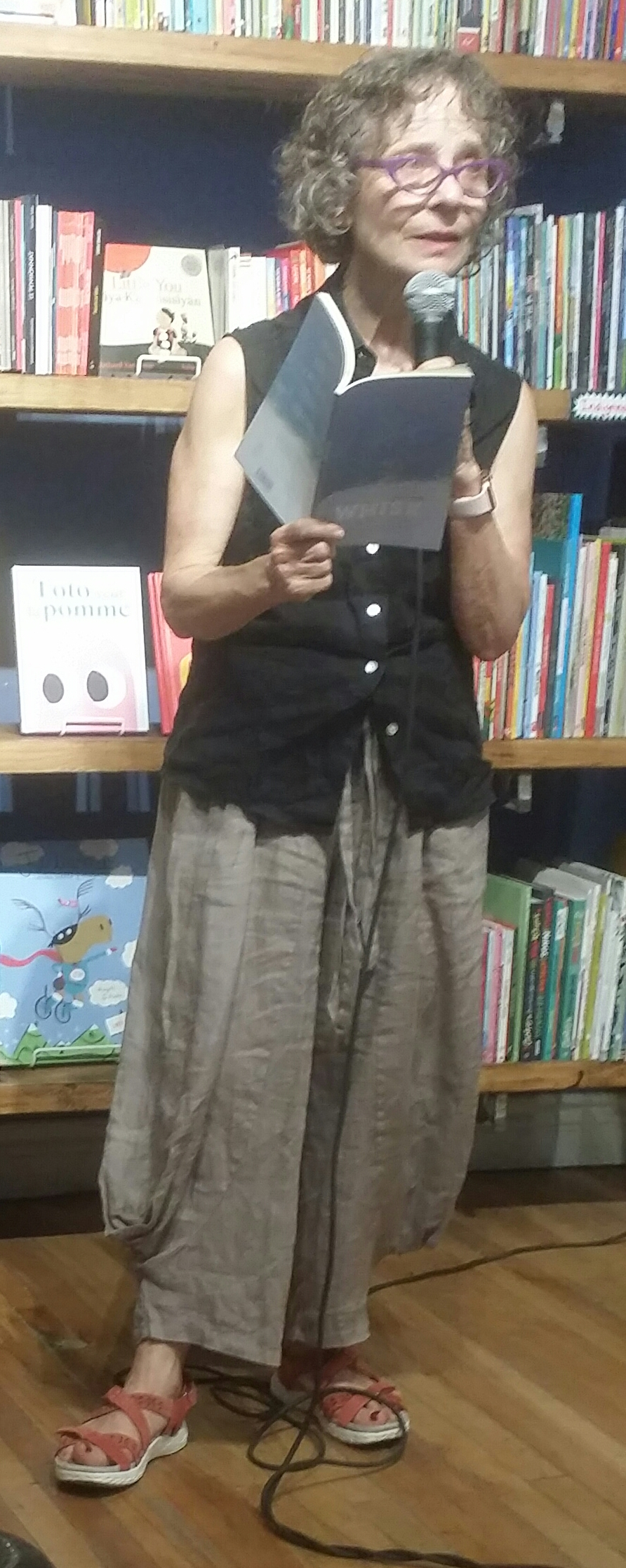
- Born: 6 August 1949 (age 77); Lanciano, Abruzzo, Italy
- Education: University of Toronto (BA); University of Windsor (MA)
- Occupations: Poet; author
- Website: hayne.net/dimichele/

Mary di Michele (born 6 August 1949) is an Italian-Canadian poet and author. She was a professor at Concordia University in Montreal, Quebec, where she taught creative writing until 2015.

== Early life and education ==
di Michele was born in Lanciano, Italy. She immigrated to Toronto, Ontario with her family in 1955. She obtained an Honours B.A. in English Literature at the University of Toronto in 1972. Later, she completed an M.A. in English and creative writing at the University of Windsor in 1974.

== Career ==
di Michele published her first book of poetry, Tree of August, in 1978. She traveled to Chile in 1987 as part of a literary cultural exchange. In 1990, she became a professor of English at Concordia University.

By 1995, di Michele had written six volumes of poetry. That year she published her first novel, Under My Skin. She continued to write and publish poetry, and in 2005 released a second novel, Tenor of Love.

In 2011, di Michele released The Flower of Youth: Pier Paolo Pasolini Poems which returns to the terror of WWII in Italy and the experiences of her family before she was born. It anticipates her next book of poetry on the post-war years, Bicycle Thieves in 2017.

In 2007, Guernica Editions published Mary di Michele: Essays on Her Works, edited by Joseph Pivato, which includes studies by ten literary critics and indicates the high regard for her literary production. In 2024, her works are held in more than 1,400 libraries.

== Works ==
- Tree of August – 1978
- Bread and Chocolate – 1980
- Mimosa and Other Poems – 1981
- Necessary Sugar – 1984
- Anything is Possible: A Selection of Eleven Women Poets (editor) – 1984
- Immune to Gravity – 1986
- Under My Skin (novel) – 1994
- Luminous Emergencies – 1990
- Stranger in You: Selected Poems and New – 1995
- Debriefing the Rose – 1998
- Tenor of Love (novel) – 2005
- The Flower of Youth: Pier Paolo Pasolini Poems – 2011
- Bicycle Thieves poems – 2017
- Montreal Book of the Dead poetry chapbook – 2020

== See also ==
- List of Canadian poets
