= David Manicom =

Canadian diplomat, civil servant, poet, and novelist

- Born: David Alton Manicom; July 19, 1960; Ingersoll, Ontario, Canada
- Education: University of Toronto; McGill University
- Occupations: Civil servant, diplomat, poet, novelist
- Writing career
- Language: English
- Notable awards: Quebec Writer’s Federation’s non-fiction prize

David Alton Manicom (born July 19, 1960) is a Canadian diplomat, civil servant, poet and novelist.

== Biography ==
Manicom was born in Ingersoll, Ontario, and lived there until he attended the University of Toronto and McGill University in Montreal. He has also lived in Aylmer, Quebec, Moscow, Islamabad, Beijing, Geneva and New Delhi.

He has contributed to numerous publications, including Rubicon, AWOL, Words Apart and Quarry. Manicom's The Burning Eaves (2003) was a finalist for the 2004 Governor General's Awards for English Language Poetry, while Progeny of Ghosts (1998) won the Quebec Writer's Federation prize for non-fiction and was short-listed for the National Writer's Trust Viacom award for non-fiction.

He is currently the associate assistant deputy minister of the Department of Immigration, Refugees and Citizenship.

== Bibliography ==
- Sense of Season (Victoria, B.C.: Porcepic, 1988)
- Theology of Swallows (Lantzville, B.C.: Oolichan, 1991)
- The Older Graces (Lantzville, B.C.: Oolichan, 1997)
- Ice in Dark Water (Lantzville, B.C.: Oolichan, 1997)
- Progeny of Ghosts: Travels in Russia and the Old Empire (Lantzville, B.C.: Oolichan, 1998)
- The Burning Eaves (Lantzville, B.C.: Oolichan, 2003)
- The School at Chartres (Lantzville, B.C.: Oolichan, 2005)
- Anna's Shadow (Montreal: Véhicule Press, 2008)
- Desert Rose, Butterfly Storm (Lantzville, B.C.: Oolichan, 2009)
