= Simina Banu =

Canadian poet

Simina Banu is a Canadian poet, whose debut poetry collection Pop won the ReLit Award for Poetry in 2021.

Her work has previously been published in the literary journals filling Station, untethered, In/Words Magazine and The Feathertale Review, and the chapbooks where art (2015) and Tomorrow, adagio (2019).
