= Andrew Hood (author) =

Canadian author

Andrew Hood is a Canadian author. He has written two books of short stories, Pardon Our Monsters (Véhicule Press) and The Cloaca (Invisible Publishing). His most recent book, Jim Guthrie: Who Needs What, is a work of nonfiction published as part of Invisible Publishing's Bibliophonic Series.

Hood's works have won him multiple accolades, including the Danuta Gleed Literary Award for Pardon Our Monsters. His writings has appeared in Maisonneuve, PRISM International, The New Quarterly, and in Joyland magazine.

Hood lives in Guelph, Ontario.

== Bibliography ==
- Pardon Our Monsters (2007)
- The Cloaca (2012)
- Jim Guthrie: Who Needs What (2015)
