= Liam Durcan =

Canadian neurologist

Liam Durcan is a Canadian neurologist at the Montreal Neurological Hospital and an Assistant Professor at McGill University. He has published two novels and a collection of short stories: A Short Journey by Car (Véhicule Press 2004), Garcia's Heart (McClelland & Stewart 2008), and The Measure of Darkness (Bellevue Literary Press 2016). Born in Winnipeg, Durcan lived in Detroit briefly as a child, and has been at the Montreal Neurological Institute since 1994.

== Writing ==
Durcan's first novel, Garcia’s Heart (McClelland & Stewart 2008) is set in Montreal. Through an act of graffiti tagging its protagonist Patrick, an entrepreneur in the medical industry who grew up in Montreal, crosses paths with Hernan Garcia, who runs a corner store or dépanneur. As the story unfolds, we find that Garcia was a doctor in Central America prior to arriving in Montreal. Garcia did work for a Central American government that has him on trial at the International Court of Justice at The Hague. Patrick attends Garcia's trial trying to sort out his feelings for his former mentor in light of the new evidence. His endeavour is further complicated when Garcia's daughter - Patrick's first girlfriend - appears. Garcia's Heart won the 2008 Arthur Ellis Award for best first novel.

The Measure of Darkness (Bellevue Literary Press 2016) is Durcan's second novel, and describes the life of an architect, Martin, who has suffered neglect and a severe brain injury as a result of a car accident. Martin cannot remember events from the days leading up to his accident. Relations within Martin's family reflect neglect: he's twice divorced and estranged from his two daughters, though one is an architect at the firm he founded. Martin's brother, who he hasn't seen in decades, comes to help him during his convalescence. While recovering, Martin recalls researching Konstantin Melnikov, a Russian architect during the Soviet era, during his undergraduate days. Martin and his supervising professor visited Melnikov in Moscow. Thoughts of Melnikov help pull Martin through his recovery. Of the novel, Durcan said "there was a story that I needed to tell, perhaps just for myself."

The short story collection A Short Journey by Car (Véhicule Press 2004) was chosen as one of The Globe and Mail's Top 100 books of 2004.Quill & Quire says of Durcan, "even when he’s falling flat, Durcan is a smooth and confident writer. Some hit-and-miss is inevitable in a collection of this breadth, and Short Journey’s good stuff bodes well for the author’s future work."

Durcan's short fiction has been published in The Fiddlehead, Zoetrope, The Antigonish Review, and Maisonneuve.

== Awards ==
Durcan won the 2004 QWF/CBC Quebec short story competition for Kick (published in A Short Journey by Car), has been nominated for the Journey Prize, and was long-listed for the 2009 Dublin IMPAC prize for his debut novel, Garcia’s Heart.
