= Governor General's Award for English to French translation =

Canadian literary award

This is a list of recipients of the Governor General's Award for English-to-French translation awarded by the Governor-General of Canada.

== Winners and nominees ==
=== 1980s ===
Year	Author	Title	Translated work
1987	Ivan Steenhout, Christiane Teasdale	L'Homme qui se croyait aimé	Heather Robertson, Willie: A Romance
1987	Jean-Pierre Fournier	Jacob Deux-Deux et le dinosaure	Mordecai Richler, Jacob Two-Two and the Dinosaur
1987	Ivan Steenhout	La couleur du sang	Brian Moore, The Colour of Blood
1987	Claudine Vivier	La Dialectique de la reproduction	Mary O'Brien, The Politics of Reproduction
1988	Didier Holtzwarth	Nucléus	Robert Bothwell, Nucleus: A History of Atomic Energy of Canada Limited
1988	Gérard Boulad	Profession: Religieuse	Marta Danylewycz, Taking the Veil
1988	Jean Lévesque, Michèle Venet	Le Rêve d'une génération	Merrily Weisbord, The Strangest Dream: Canadian Communists, the Spy Trials and the Cold War
1988	Michel Saint-Germain	Flagrant Délice	James Burke, Arnold Manweiler, If It Weren't for Sex, I'd Have to Get a Job
1989	Jean Antonin Billard	Les Âges de l'amour	Dorothy Livesay, The Phases of Love
1989	Ronald Guévremont	Comme un vent chaud de Chine	Kent Stetson, Warm Wind in China
1989	Christine Klein-Lataud	Un Oiseau dans la maison	Margaret Laurence, A Bird in the House

=== 1990s ===
Year	Author	Title	Translated work
1990	Charlotte Melançon, Robert Melançon	Le Second rouleau	A. M. Klein, The Second Scroll
1990	Claire Dupond	Lettres à un ami québécois	Philip Resnick, Letters to a Québécois Friend
1990	Ivan Steenhout	Onyx John	Trevor Ferguson, Onyx John
1991	Jean-Paul Sainte-Marie, Brigitte Chabert Hacikyan	Les Enfants d'Aataentsic: l'histoire du peuple huron	Bruce Trigger, The Children of Aataentsic: A History of the Huron People to 1660
1991	Jean Antonin Billard, Christine Le Boeuf	Orages électriques	David Homel, Electrical Storms
1991	Brigitte Chabert Hacikyan	Le Canada au temps des aventuriers	Robert McGhee, Canada Rediscovered
1991	Michèle Marineau	Sur le rivage	Lucy Maud Montgomery, Along the Shore
1991	Colette Tonge	Un heureux canular	Robertson Davies, Leaven of Malice
1992	Jean Papineau	La mémoire postmoderne	Mark A. Cheetham, Remembering Postmodernism: Trends in Recent Canadian Art
1992	Marie-Luce Constant	Les princes marchands	Peter C. Newman, Company of Adventurers
1992	Hervé Juste	Le Canada aux enchères	Linda McQuaig, The Quick and the Dead
1992	Michèle Marineau	Le monde merveilleux de Marigold	Lucy Maud Montgomery, Magic for Marigold
1993	Marie José Thériault	L'Oeuvre du Gallois	Robert Walshe, Wales' Work
1993	Hervé Juste	Histoire de la sécurité sociale au Canada	Dennis Guest, The Emergence of Social Security in Canada
1993	Charlotte Melançon	Grandeur et misère de la modernité	Charles Taylor, The Malaise of Modernity
1994	Jude Des Chênes	Le mythe du sauvage	Olive Dickason, Myth of the Savage
1994	Claire Dupond, Hervé Juste	Les spécialistes des sciences sociales et la politique au Canada	Stephen Brooks, Alain Gagnon, Social Scientists and Politics in Canada: Between Clerisy and Vanguard
1994	Michèle Marineau	Au-delà des ténèbres	Lucy Maud Montgomery, Among the Shadows
1994	Normand Paiement, Hervé Juste	Les Géants des ordures	Harold Crooks, Giants of Garbage
1994	Daniel Poliquin	Le récit de voyage en Nouvelle–France de l'abbé peintre Hugues Pommier	Douglas Glover, A Guide to Animal Behaviour
1995	Hervé Juste	Entre l'ordre et la liberté	Gérald Bernier, Daniel Salée, The Shaping of Quebec Politics and Society: Colonialism, Power and the Transition of Capitalism in the 19th Century
1995	Michèle Causse	Loyale à la chasse	Dôre Michelut, Loyalty to the Hunt
1995	Hervé Juste	Trudeau : l'illusion héroïque	Christina McCall, Stephen Clarkson, Trudeau and Our Times, Volume 2: The Heroic Delusion
1995	Anne Malena	La Maraude	Kristjana Gunnars, The Prowler
1995	Marie José Thériault	À l'aube de lendemains précaires	Neil Bissoondath, On the Eve of Uncertain Tomorrows
1996	Christiane Teasdale	Systèmes de survie: Dialogue sur les fondements moraux du commerce et de la politique	Jane Jacobs, Systems of Survival
1996	Pierre DesRuisseaux	Contre-taille – Poèmes choisis de vingt-cinq auteurs canadiens-anglais	Anthology of selected poetry by 25 English Canadian poets
1996	Hélène Le Beau	Les Dangers de la pensée critique	Stephen Schecter, The Dangers of Critical Thought
1997	Marie José Thériault	Arracher les montagnes	Neil Bissoondath, Digging the Mountains
1997	François Barcelo	La Face cachée des pierres	George Szanto, The Underside of Stones
1997	Nicole Côté	Verre de tempête	Jane Urquhart, Storm Glass
1997	Pierrot Lambert	L'Insight: Étude de la compréhension humaine	Bernard Lonergan, Insight: A Study of Human Understanding
1998	Charlotte Melançon	Les Sources du moi: La Formation de l'identité moderne	Charles Taylor, Sources of the Self
1998	Paule Noyart	Leonard Cohen : Le Canadien errant	Ira Nadel, Leonard Cohen
1998	Hélène Rioux	Self	Yann Martel, Self
1999	Jacques Brault	Transfiguration	E. D. Blodgett, Transfiguration
1999	Charlotte Melançon	Réflexions d'un frère siamois	John Ralston Saul, Reflections of a Siamese Twin: Canada at the End of the Twentieth Century
1999	Marie José Thériault	Ours	Marian Engel, Bear

=== 2000s ===
Year	Author	Title	Translated work
2000	Lori Saint-Martin, Paul Gagné	Un parfum de cèdre	Ann-Marie MacDonald, Fall on Your Knees
2000	Jude Des Chênes	L'honneur du guerrier	Michael Ignatieff, Warrior's Honour: Ethnic War and the Modern Conscience
2000	Dominique Issenhuth	Amants	Charles Foran, Butterfly Lovers
2001	Michel Saint-Germain	No Logo: La Tyrannie des marques	Naomi Klein, No Logo
2001	Agnès Guitard	Les hauturiers: ils précédèrent les Vikings en Amérique	Farley Mowat, The Farfarers: Before the Norse
2001	Maryse Warda	Motel de passage	George F. Walker, Suburban Motel
2002	Paule Noyart	Histoire universelle de la chasteté et du célibat	Elizabeth Abbott, A History of Celibacy
2002	Florence Bernard	F. R. Scott: une vie	Sandra Djwa, F.R. Scott: The Politics of the Imagination
2002	Jean Paré	La révolution des droits	Michael Ignatieff, The Rights Revolution
2002	Carole Sadelain	La nature des économies	Jane Jacobs, The Nature of Economies
2003	Agnès Guitard	Un amour de Salomé	Linda Leith, The Tragedy Queen
2003	Yolande Amzallag	Le canari éthique: science, société et esprit humain	Margaret Somerville, The Ethical Canary: Science, Society, and the Human Spirit
2003	Paule Noyart	L’Or bleu: l’eau, nouvel enjeu stratégique et commercial	Maude Barlow, Tony Clarke, Blue Gold: The Battle Against Corporate Theft of the World’s Water
2003	Hélène Paré	L’histoire spectacle: le cas du tricentenaire de Québec	H. V. Nelles, The Art of Nation Building: Pageantry and Spectacle at Quebec's Tercentenary
2003	Lori Saint-Martin, Paul Gagné	L’analyste	David Homel, The Speaking Cure
2004	Ivan Steenhout	Les Indes accidentelles	Robert Finley, The Accidental Indies
2004	Claire Dé	Le cahier d'Hellman	Robert Majzels, Hellman's Scrapbook
2004	Carole Noël	Ce qu'il nous reste	Aislinn Hunter, What's Left Us
2004	Lori Saint-Martin, Paul Gagné	Le Pas de l'ourse	Douglas Glover, Elle
2004	Claudine Vivier	La Rivière disparue	Brian Doyle, Mary Ann Alice
2005	Rachel Martinez	Glenn Gould: une vie	Kevin Bazzana, Wondrous Strange: The Life and Art of Glenn Gould
2005	Benoit Léger	Miracles en série	Carol Shields, Various Miracles
2005	Lori Saint-Martin, Paul Gagné	Drôle de tendresse	Miriam Toews, A Complicated Kindness
2005	Lori Saint-Martin, Paul Gagné	La fille du Kamikaze	Kerri Sakamoto, One Hundred Million Hearts
2005	Lori Saint-Martin, Paul Gagné	Le Vol du corbeau	Ann-Marie MacDonald, The Way the Crow Flies
2006	Sophie Voillot	Un jardin de papier	Thomas Wharton, Salamander
2006	Dominique Fortier	Parlez-vous boro: voyage aux pays des langues menacées	Mark Abley, Spoken Here: Travels Among Threatened Languages
2006	Dominique Fortier	L’Arbre: une vie	David Suzuki, Wayne Grady, Tree: A Life Story
2006	Daniel Poliquin	L’homme qui voulait boire la mer	Pan Bouyoucas, The Man Who Wanted to Drink Up the Sea
2006	Lori Saint-Martin, Paul Gagné	L’Odyssée de Pénélope	Margaret Atwood, The Penelopiad
2007	Lori Saint-Martin, Paul Gagné	Dernières notes	Tamas Dobozy, Last Notes and Other Stories
2007	Suzanne Anfossi	Trudeau: Citoyen du monde, tome 1: 1919-1968	John English, Citizen of the World: The Life of Pierre Elliott Trudeau, Volume One: 1919-1968
2007	Marie Frankland	La chaise berçante	A. M. Klein, The Rocking Chair
2007	Claudine Vivier	Pas l’ombre d’une trace	Norah McClintock, Not a Trace
2007	Sophie Voillot	La fin de l’alphabet	C. S. Richardson, The End of the Alphabet
2008	Claire Chabalier, Louise Chabalier	Tracey en mille morceaux	Maureen Medved, The Tracey Fragments
2008	Dominique Bouchard	Les grands lacs: histoire naturelle d’une région en perpétuelle mutation	Wayne Grady, The Great Lakes: The Natural History of a Changing Region
2008	Jean-Marc Dalpé	Roc & rail: Trains fantômes suivi de Slague: l’histoire d’un mineur	Mansel Robinson, Rock ’n Rail: Ghost Trains and Spitting Slag
2008	Lori Saint-Martin, Paul Gagné	Big Bang	Neil Smith, Bang Crunch
2008	Sophie Voillot	Logogryphe	Thomas Wharton, The Logogryph
2009	Paule Noyart	Le miel d'Harar	Camilla Gibb, Sweetness in the Belly
2009	Sylvie Nicolas	Lundi sans faute	Joel Thomas Hynes, Right Away Monday
2009	Hélène Rioux	Certitudes	Madeleine Thien, Certainty
2009	Lori Saint-Martin, Paul Gagné	Cartes postales de l'enfer	Neil Bissoondath, The Soul of All Great Designs
2009	Lori Saint-Martin, Paul Gagné	La veuve	Gil Adamson, The Outlander

=== 2010s ===
Year	Author	Title	Translated work
2010	Sophie Voillot	Le cafard	Rawi Hage, Cockroach
2010	Geneviève Letarte, Alison L. Strayer	Rencontres fortuites	Mavis Gallant, A Fairly Good Time
2010	Lori Saint-Martin, Paul Gagné	Sale argent : petit traité d’économie à l’intention des détracteurs du capitalisme	Joseph Heath, Filthy Lucre: Economics for People Who Hate Capitalism
2010	Lori Saint-Martin, Paul Gagné	Les Troutman volants	Miriam Toews, The Flying Troutmans
2010	Claudine Vivier	L'exode des loups	Sharon Stewart, Wolf Rider
2011	Maryse Warda	Toxique ou L’incident dans l’autobus	Greg MacArthur, The Toxic Bus Incident
2011	Geneviève Letarte	Le week-end en Bourgogne	Mavis Gallant, Going Ashore
2011	Sophie Voillot	Le droit chemin	David Homel, Mid Way
2012	Alain Roy	Glenn Gould	Mark Kingwell, Glenn Gould
2012	Sophie Cardinal-Corriveau	Un adieu à la musique	Charles Foran, Carolan's Farewell
2012	Dominique Fortier	Une maison dans les nuages	Margaret Laurence, The Prophet's Camel Bell
2012	Lori Saint-Martin, Paul Gagné	Irma Voth	Miriam Toews, Irma Voth
2012	Lori Saint-Martin, Paul Gagné	La petite cousine de Freud	Ann Charney, Distantly Related to Freud
2013	Sophie Voillot	L'enfant du jeudi	Alison Pick, Far to Go
2013	Rachel Martinez	Les maux d'Ambroise Bukowski	Susin Nielsen, Word Nerd
2013	Daniel Poliquin	Du village à la ville: comment les migrants changent le monde	Doug Saunders, Arrival City: The Final Migration and Our Next World
2013	Hélène Rioux	Le cousin	John Calabro, The Cousin
2013	Lori Saint-Martin, Paul Gagné	Jamais je ne t'oublierai	Miriam Toews, Swing Low: A Life
2014	Daniel Poliquin	L’Indien malcommode: un portrait inattendu des Autochtones d’Amérique du Nord	Thomas King, The Inconvenient Indian: A Curious Account of Native People in North America
2014	Éric Fontaine	Les Blondes	Emily Schultz, The Blondes
2014	Hervé Juste	Poisson d’avril	Josip Novakovich, April Fool's Day
2014	Lori Saint-Martin, Paul Gagné	La femme Hokusai	Katherine Govier, The Ghost Brush
2014	Lori Saint-Martin, Paul Gagné	Une brève histoire des Indiens au Canada	Thomas King, A Short History of Indians in Canada
2015	Lori Saint-Martin, Paul Gagné	Solomon Gursky	Mordecai Richler, Solomon Gursky Was Here
2015	Christiane Duchesne	Élisabeth dans le pétrin	Susan Glickman, Bernadette in the Doghouse
2015	Catherine Ego	Voisins et ennemis. La Guerre de sécession et l'invention du Canada	John Boyko, Blood and Daring : How Canada Fought the American Civil War and Forged a Nation
2015	Marie Frankland	MxT	Sina Queyras, MxT
2015	Rachel Martinez	Ma vie (racontée malgré moi) par Henry K. Larsen	Susin Nielsen, The Reluctant Journal of Henry K. Larsen
2016	Catherine Ego	La destruction des Indiens des Plaines : maladies, famines organisées, disparition du mode de vie autochtone	James Daschuk, Clearing the Plains
2016	Christophe Bernard	Les hautes montagnes du Portugal	Yann Martel, The High Mountains of Portugal
2016	Daniel Poliquin	Le grand retour : le réveil autochtone	John Ralston Saul, The Comeback
2016	Lori Saint-Martin, Paul Gagné	Joshua	Mordecai Richler, Joshua Then and Now
2016	Madeleine Stratford	Elle nage	Marianne Apostolides, Swim
2017	Daniel Poliquin	Un barbare en Chine nouvelle	Alexandre Trudeau, Barbarian Lost: Travels in the New China
2017	Carole Noël, Marianne Noël-Allen	Le Sans-papiers	Lawrence Hill, The Illegal
2017	Paule Noyart	La disparition d'Heinrich Schlögel	Martha Baillie, The Search for Heinrich Schlögel
2017	Lori Saint-Martin, Paul Gagné	Premières lueurs : mon combat contre le trouble de stress post-traumatique	Roméo Dallaire, Waiting for First Light: My Ongoing Battle with PTSD
2017	Sophie Voillot	Le sous-majordome	Patrick deWitt, Undermajordomo Minor
2018	Lori Saint-Martin, Paul Gagné	Le monde selon Barney	Mordecai Richler, Barney's Version
2018	Éric Fontaine	Sweetland	Michael Crummey, Sweetland
2018	Daniel Grenier, William S. Messier	De l’utilité de l’ennui : textes de balle	Andrew Forbes, The Utility of Boredom: Baseball Essays
2018	Laurence Gough	Naissances	Kate Cayley, How You Were Born
2018	Catherine Leroux	Le saint patron des merveilles	Mark Frutkin, Fabrizio's Return
2019	Catherine Leroux	Nous qui n'étions rien	Madeleine Thien, Do Not Say We Have Nothing
2019	Nicolas Calvé	L'animal langage : la compétence linguistique humaine	Charles Taylor, The Language Animal
2019	Lori Saint-Martin, Paul Gagné	Le Yiddish à l'usage des pirates	Gary Barwin, Yiddish for Pirates
2019	Madeleine Stratford	Pilleurs de rêves	Cherie Dimaline, The Marrow Thieves
2019	Sophie Voillot	Onze jours en septembre	Kathleen Winter, Lost in September

=== 2020s ===
Year	Author	Title	Translated work	Ref
2020	Georgette LeBlanc	Océan	Susan Goyette, Ocean	
2020	Arianne Des Rochers	Jonny Appleseed	Joshua Whitehead, Jonny Appleseed	
2020	Daniel Grenier	On pleure pas au bingo	Dawn Dumont, Nobody Cries at Bingo	
2020	Sonya Malaborza	L'Accoucheuse de Scots Bay	Ami McKay, The Birth House	
2020	Sophie Voillot	La Société du feu de l’enfer	Rawi Hage, Beirut Hellfire Society	
2021	Marie Frankland	Poèmes 1938-1984	Elizabeth Smart, The Collected Poems	
2021	Dominique Fortier	La ballade de Baby suivi de Sagesse de l'absurde	Heather O'Neill, Lullabies for Little Criminals and Wisdom in Nonsense	
2021	Daniel Grenier	La Course de Rose	Dawn Dumont, Rose's Run	
2021	Colette St-Hilaire	Toots fait la Shiva, avenue Minto	Erín Moure, Sitting Shiva on Minto Avenue, by Toots	
2021	Madeleine Stratford	Petits marronnages	Kaie Kellough, Dominoes at the Crossroads	
2022	Mélissa Verreault	Partie de chasse au petit gibier entre lâches au club de tir du coin	Megan Gail Coles, Small Game Hunting at the Local Coward Gun Club	
2022	Sylvie Bérard, Suzanne Grenier	Le fruit de la puanteur	Larissa Lai, Salt Fish Girl	
2022	Éric Fontaine	Le malenchantement de sainte Lucy	Zsuzsi Gartner, The Beguiling	
2022	Benoit Laflamme	Dans la lugubre forêt nos corps seront suspendus	Ava Farmehri, Through the Sad Wood Our Corpses Will Hang	
2022	Catherine Leroux	Les coups de dés	Sean Michaels, The Wagers	
2023	Catherine Ego	Dans lʼombre du soleil: Réflexions sur la race et les récits	Esi Edugyan, Out of the Sun: On Race and Storytelling	
2023	Dominique Fortier	Nʼayons pas peur du ciel	Emma Hooper, We Should Not Be Afraid of the Sky	
2023	Marie Frankland	Tout est bien	Mona Awad, All's Well	
2023	Luba Markovskaia	Père fictif	Joe Ollmann, Fictional Father	
2023	Madeleine Stratford	soufrelangue	Rebecca Salazar, sulphurtongue	
2024	Éric Fontaine	Ristigouche : Le long cours de la rivière sauvage	Philip Lee, Restigouche: The Long Run of the Wild River	
2024	Alexandre Fontaine Rousseau	Mourir pour la cause : Révolution dans le Québec des années 1960	Chris Oliveros, Are You Willing to Die for the Cause? Revolution in 1960s Quebec	
2024	Daniel Grenier	Charlie Muskrat	Harold R. Johnson, Charlie Muskrat	
2024	Madeleine Stratford	Cours vers le danger	Sarah Polley, Run Towards the Danger: Confrontations with a Body of Memory	
2024	Sophie Voillot	La messagère	Thomas Wharton, The Book of Rain	
2025	Sylvie Bérard, Suzanne Grenier	Les soeurs de la Muée	Larissa Lai, The Tiger Flu	
2025	Marie Frankland	Rouge	Mona Awad, Rouge	
2025	Annie Goulet	Créatures obscures du 21e siècle	Kim Fu, Lesser Known Monsters of the 21st Century	
2025	Catherine Leroux	Étude pour l’obéissance	Sarah Bernstein, Study for Obedience	
2025	Geneviève Robichaud, Danielle LeBlanc	Nous, Jane	Aimee Wall, We, Jane	
2026	Catherine Ego	La saignée. Enquête sur l’endométriose et la misogynie médicale ordinaire	Tracey Lindeman, Bleed: Destroying Myths and Misogyny in Endometriosis Care	
2026	Vicky Bernard	Le trou dans le ciel	Liz Howard, Letters in a Bruised Cosmos	
2026	Jeannot Clair	Jungle	Eugene Marten, Jungle	
2026	Daniel Grenier	La lune des feuilles rouges	Waubgeshig Rice, The Moon of the Turning Leaves	
2026	Sophie Voillot	Seule la peur est bleue	Martha Baillie, There Is No Blue	
