= 2016 Governor General's Awards =

Canadian literary award

The shortlisted nominees for the 2016 Governor General's Awards for Literary Merit were announced on October 4, 2016, and the winners were announced on October 25.

== English ==
Category	Winner	Nominated
Fiction	Madeleine Thien, Do Not Say We Have Nothing	Gary Barwin, Yiddish for Pirates; Anosh Irani, The Parcel; Kerry Lee Powell, Willem de Kooning's Paintbrush; Katherena Vermette, The Break
Non-fiction	Bill Waiser, A World We Have Lost: Saskatchewan Before 1905	Kamal Al-Solaylee, Brown: What Being Brown in the World Today Means (To Everyone); Teva Harrison, In-Between Days: A Memoir about Living with Cancer; Harold R. Johnson, Firewater: How Alcohol is Killing My People (and Yours); Marc Raboy, Marconi: The Man Who Networked the World
Poetry	Steven Heighton, The Waking Comes Late	Joe Denham, Regeneration Machine; Susan Holbrook, Throaty Wipes; Garry Thomas Morse, Prairie Harbour; Rachel Rose, Marry & Burn
Drama	Colleen Murphy, Pig Girl	Brad Fraser, Kill Me Now; Donna-Michelle St. Bernard, A Man A Fish; Jordan Tannahill, Concord Floral; Mary Vingoe, Refuge
Children's literature	Martine Leavitt, Calvin	Mikaela Everett, The Unquiet; E. K. Johnston, A Thousand Nights; Trilby Kent, Once, in a Town Called Moth; Tim Wynne-Jones, The Emperor of Any Place
Children's illustration	Jon-Erik Lappano and Kellen Hatanaka, Tokyo Digs a Garden	Jo Ellen Bogart and Sydney Smith, The White Cat and the Monk; Lucy Ruth Cummins, A Hungry Lion or a Dwindling Assortment of Animals; Mireille Messier and Pierre Pratt, The Branch; Esmé Shapiro, Ooko
French to English translation	Lazer Lederhendler, The Party Wall (Catherine Leroux, Le mur mitoyen)	Rhonda Mullins, Guano (Louis Carmain, Guano); Neil Smith, The Goddess of Fireflies (Geneviève Pettersen, La déesse des mouches à feu)

== French ==
Category	Winner	Nominated
Fiction	Dominique Fortier, Au péril de la mer	Anaïs Barbeau-Lavalette, La femme qui fuit; Hugues Corriveau, Les Enfants de Liverpool; Martine Delvaux, Blanc dehors; Daniel Grenier, L'Année la plus longue
Non-fiction	Roland Viau, Amerindia : essais d'ethnohistoire autochtone	André Habib, La main gauche de Jean-Pierre Léaud; Michel Morin, Être et ne pas être; Yvon Rivard, Exercices d'amitié; Louise Warren, La vie flottante
Poetry	Normand de Bellefeuille, Le poème est une maison de bord de mer	Louise Bouchard, Personne et le soleil; Antoine Dumas, Au monde inventaire; Pierre Nepveu, La dureté des matières et de l'eau; Rodney Saint-Éloi, Je suis la fille du baobab brûlé
Drama	Wajdi Mouawad, Inflammation du verbe vivre	Hervé Bouchard, Le faux pas de l'actrice dans sa traîne; Michel Marc Bouchard, La divine illusion; Sébastien David, Les haut-parleurs; Olivier Kemeid, Five Kings : l'histoire de notre chute
Children's literature	François Gilbert, Hare Krishna	Camille Bouchard, Nouvelle-Orléans; Mario Brassard, Quand hurle la nuit; Amélie Dumoulin, Fé M Fé; Patrick Isabelle, Camille
Children's illustration	Stéphanie Lapointe and Rogé, Grand-père et la lune	Jules Asselin and Ninon Pelletier, Le mystère des billes d'or; Simon Boulerice and Delphie Côté-Lacroix, Florence et Léon; Andrée Poulin and Marie Lafrance, Deux garçons et un secret; Yayo, Pikiq
English to French translation	Catherine Ego, La destruction des Indiens des Plaines : maladies, famines organisées, disparition du mode de vie autochtone (James Daschuk, Clearing the Plains)	Christophe Bernard, Les hautes montagnes du Portugal (Yann Martel, The High Mountains of Portugal); Daniel Poliquin, Le grand retour : le réveil autochtone (John Ralston Saul, The Comeback); Lori Saint-Martin and Paul Gagné, Joshua (Mordecai Richler, Joshua Then and Now); Madeleine Stratford, Elle nage (Marianne Apostolides, Swim)
