= 2010 Governor General's Awards =

Canadian literary award

The shortlisted nominees for the 2010 Governor General's Awards for Literary Merit were announced on October 13, and winning titles were announced on November 16. Each winner will receive a cheque for $25,000 and a leatherbound copy of their book.

== English ==
Category	Winner	Nominated
Fiction	Dianne Warren, Cool Water	Sandra Birdsell, Waiting for Joe; Emma Donoghue, Room; Drew Hayden Taylor, Motorcycles & Sweetgrass; Kathleen Winter, Annabel
Non-fiction	Allan Casey, Lakeland: Journeys into the Soul of Canada	Elizabeth Abbott, A History of Marriage; Ian Brown, The Boy in the Moon: A Father's Search for His Disabled Son; Karen Connelly, Burmese Lessons: A Love Story; John English, Just Watch Me: The Life of Pierre Elliott Trudeau, 1968-2000
Poetry	Richard Greene, Boxing the Compass	Michael Harris, Circus; Daryl Hine, &: A Serial Poem; Sandy Pool, Exploding into Night; Melanie Siebert, Deepwater Vee
Drama	Robert Chafe, Afterimage	Charlotte Corbeil-Coleman, Scratch; Michael Healey, Courageous; Judith Thompson, Such Creatures; David Yee, lady in the red dress
Children's literature	Wendy Phillips, Fishtailing	K. L. Denman, Me, Myself and Ike; Lesley Fairfield, Tyranny; Gina McMurchy-Barber, Free as a Bird; Cheryl Rainfield, Scars
Children's illustration	Jon Klassen, Cat's Night Out	Kristin Bridgeman, Uirapuru; Julie Flett, Owls See Clearly at Night; Matt James, I Know Here; Renata Liwska, The Quiet Book
French to English translation	Linda Gaboriau, Forests (Wajdi Mouawad, Forêts)	Sheila Fischman, The Blue Notebook (Michel Tremblay, Le Cahier bleu); Sheila Fischman, On the Proper Use of Stars (Dominique Fortier, Du bon usage des étoiles); Liedewy Hawke, High-Wire Summer (Louise Dupré, L'été funambule); Lazer Lederhendler, The Breakwater House (Pascale Quiviger, La maison des temps rompus)

== French ==
Category	Winner	Nominated
Fiction	Kim Thúy, Ru	Marie-Claire Blais, Mai au bal des prédateurs; Martine Desjardins, Maleficium; Agnès Gruda, Onze petites trahisons; Dany Laferrière, L'énigme du retour
Non-fiction	Michel Lavoie, C'est ma seigneurie que je réclame : la lutte des Hurons de Lorette pour la seigneurie de Sillery, 1650-1900	René-Daniel Dubois, Morceaux : entretiens sur l'écho du monde, l'imaginaire et l'écriture; Marie McAndrew, Les majorités fragiles et l'éducation : Belgique, Catalogne, Irlande du Nord, Québec; Pierre Ouellet, Où suis-je ? Paroles des égarés; Yvon Rivard, Une idée simple
Poetry	Danielle Fournier, effleurés de lumière	Francis Catalano, qu'une lueur des lieux; Marie-Josée Charest, Rien que la guerre, c'est tout; Carole David, Manuel de poétique à l'intention des jeunes filles; Pierre Nepveu, Les verbes majeurs
Drama	David Paquet, Porc-épic	Geneviève Billette, Les ours dorment enfin; Évelyne de la Chenelière, L'imposture; Emma Haché, Trafiquée; Gilles Poulin-Denis, Rearview
Children's literature	Élise Turcotte, Rose : derrière le rideau de la folie	Michel Noël, Nishka; Patrice Robitaille, Le Chenil; Yves Steinmetz, La Chamane de bois-rouge; Alain Ulysse Tremblay, Le dernier été
Children's illustration	Daniel Sylvestre, Rose : derrière le rideau de la folie	Josée Bisaillon, Le funambule; Virginie Egger, Mon premier amour; Manon Gauthier, Triste sort; Melinda Josie, Le géranium
English to French translation	Sophie Voillot, Le cafard (Rawi Hage, Cockroach)	Geneviève Letarte and Alison L. Strayer, Rencontres fortuites (Mavis Gallant, A Fairly Good Time); Lori Saint-Martin and Paul Gagné, Sale argent : petit traité d'économie à l'intention des détracteurs du capitalisme (Joseph Heath, Filthy Lucre: Economics for People Who Hate Capitalism); Lori Saint-Martin and Paul Gagné, Les Troutman volants (Miriam Toews, The Flying Troutmans); Claudine Vivier, L'exode des loups (Sharon Stewart, Wolf Rider)
