= Dominique Fortier =

Canadian novelist and translator

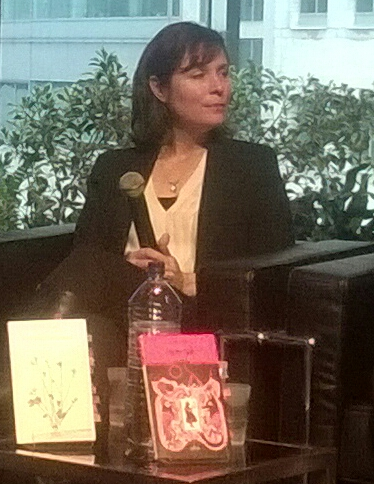
- In Montreal, Quebec, Canada at the 2018 Montreal Book Fair (Salon du Livre).
- Born: 1972 (age 53–54); Quebec City, Quebec, Canada
- Occupations: novelist, translator
- Writing career
- Period: 2000s-present
- Notable works: Au péril de la mer (2015); Les villes de papier (2018)
- Notable awards: Governor General's Award for French-language fiction (2016)

Dominique Fortier (born 1972) is a Canadian novelist and translator from Quebec, who won the Governor General's Award for French-language fiction at the 2016 Governor General's Awards for her novel Au péril de la mer.

A graduate of McGill University, she published her debut novel Du bon usage des étoiles in 2008. That book was a shortlisted Governor General's Award finalist at the 2009 Governor General's Awards, and its English translation by Sheila Fischman, On the Proper Use of Stars, was a finalist for the Governor General's Award for French to English translation at the 2010 Governor General's Awards. Her second novel Les Larmes de Saint-Laurent was published in 2010, and its English translation by Fischman, Wonder, was a finalist for the translation award at the 2014 Governor General's Awards.

In 2014, Fortier and Nicolas Dickner published Révolutions, a collaborative project for which they each wrote a short piece each day for a year based on a word chosen from the French Republican Calendar.

Fortier is also a three-time nominee for the Governor General's Award for English to French translation, garnering two nominations at the 2006 Governor General's Awards for her translations of Mark Abley's Spoken Here: Travels Among Threatened Languages and David Suzuki and Wayne Grady's Tree: A Life Story, and at the 2012 Governor General's Awards for her translation of Margaret Laurence's The Prophet's Camel Bell.

In 2020 she received the Prix Renaudot essay for Les villes de papier.

== Works ==
- Du bon usage des étoiles, 2008 (On the Proper Use of Stars, McClelland & Stewart, 2009)
- Les Larmes de saint Laurent, 2010 (Wonder, McClelland & Stewart, 2014)
- La porte du ciel, 2011
- Révolutions, co-published with Nicolas Dickner, 2014
- Au péril de la mer, 2015 (The Island of Books, Coach House Books, 2015)
- Les villes de papier : une vie d'Emily Dickinson, 2018 (Paper Houses, Coach House Books, 2019)
- Pour mémoire : petits miracles et cailloux blancs, co-published with Rafaële Germain, 2019
- Les ombres blanches, 2022 (Pale Shadows, Coach House Books, 2024)
- Quand viendra l'aube, 2022

== Awards and honors ==
- 2011: Prix Gens de mer du Festival Étonnants voyageurs (for Du bon usage des étoiles)
- 2016: Governor General's Award for French-language fiction (for Au péril de la mer)
- 2018: Prix de traduction de la fondation Cole (for Hôtel Lonely Hearts)
- 2019: Prix littéraire des lycéens AIEQ (for Les villes de papier)
- 2020: Prix Renaudot (Essay) (for Les villes de papier)
- 2023: Prix Malesherbes, le Libraire du roi (for Les ombres blanches)
- 2025: Longlisted for the International Dublin Literary Award (for Pale Shadows)
