= Marianne Apostolides =

Canadian novelist and memoirist

- Occupations: novelist, memoirist
- Writing career
- Period: 1990s-present
- Notable works: Swim, Voluptuous Pleasure

Marianne Apostolides is a Canadian novelist and memoirist. She is best known for her 2009 novel Swim, whose French-language translation by Madeleine Stratford was shortlisted for the Governor General's Award for English to French translation at the 2016 Governor General's Awards, and her 2012 memoir Voluptuous Pleasure: The Truth About the Writing Life, which was named one of the 100 best books of the year by The Globe and Mail.

== Works ==
- Inner Hunger: A Young Woman's Struggle Through Anorexia and Bulimia (1998)
- Swim (2009)
- The Lucky Child (2010)
- Voluptuous Pleasure: The Truth About the Writing Life (2012)
- Sophrosyne (2014)
- Deep Salt Water (2017)
- I Can't Get You Out of My Mind (2020)
