= Merilyn Simonds =

Canadian writer (born 1949)

Merilyn Simonds (born 1949) is a Canadian writer.

== Biography ==
Merilyn Simonds was born in 1949 in Winnipeg, Manitoba. She spent her childhood in Brazil, returning to Canada as a teenager, where she was educated at the University of Western Ontario. She subsequently worked as a freelance writer and was an editor of Harrowsmith. Throughout the 1980s and 1990s, Simonds frequently published lifestyle and nature journalism for magazines such as Canadian Geographic, Saturday Night and Equinox.

In that time, she wrote nine books of nonfiction, a children's book about water and, in 1991, co-wrote, with Merrily Weisbord, the book accompaniment to the controversial CBC Television documentary The Valour and the Horror.

In 1996, she published her first literary work, The Convict Lover, a finalist for the 1996 Governor General's Awards. The book is based on a cache of letters Simonds found in her attic, written in 1919 by an inmate of Kingston Penitentiary to a young woman who lived on the edge of the quarry where the prisoner did hard time. Simonds pieced together the story from the 79 letters, some written on toilet paper and scraps of calendar, and including four from the young women. The Convict Lover reproduces the letters interspersed with the story of incarceration inside Canada's most notorious prison and the struggle for human connection. Now considered a classic in Canadian creative nonfiction, The Convict Lover was chosen as one of the top ten nonfiction books of 1996 by the Globe and Mail, Quill & Quire Magazine, Elm Street Magazine, and Maclean's. It was translated into Chinese, Japanese, and German and, in 1997, was adapted for the stage by the Kingston Summer Theatre Festival, premiering at Theatre Passe Muraille in Toronto in the fall of 1998.

The Lion in the Room Next Door, Simonds's collection of linked, autobiographical stories, was published in 1999 and became a national bestseller. The following year, it was released by Bloomsbury in England, G.P. Putnam's Sons in the United States and btb Verlag in Germany.

In 2004, she published her first novel, The Holding, which was selected a New York Times Book Review Editors' Choice. This was followed by a travel memoir, Breakfast at the Exit Café: Travels in America, cowritten with her husband, Wayne Grady and selected a Globe 100 best book of 2010.

In the spring of 2009, Simonds launched a weekly personal essay on her website frugalistagardener.com. These were collected in 2011 and published as A New Leaf: Growing with my Garden. In August 2012, she published a collection of flash fiction, The Paradise Project in a limited edition book with uncut pages, hand-set and printed on a hand-operated 19th century printing press, with endpapers made by paper artist Emily Cook, using plant material from Simonds's garden.

Simonds has served as Writer in Residence in Whistler (2012) and at Green College, University of British Columbia (2009). She currently teaches creative writing in the MFA Optional Residency Creative Writing program at the University of British Columbia and privately mentors writers working in both fiction and creative nonfiction. She writes a monthly column, AboutBooks, in the Kingston Whig Standard and was Artistic Director of Kingston WritersFest.

Simonds lives with writer and translator Wayne Grady outside Kingston, Ontario.

== Works ==
Merilyn Simonds talks about A New Leaf on Bookbits radio.

=== Nonfiction ===
- The Art of Soapmaking (Camden House Publishing, 1979)
- Canoecraft (Camden House Publishing, 1983)
- Sunwings (Camden House Publishing, 1985)
- Home Playgrounds (Camden House Publishing, 1987)
- A Chronicle of Our House (Camden House Publishing, 1988)
- The Valour and the Horror (HarperCollins, 1991)
- The Harrowsmith Salad Garden (Camden House, 1992)
- Fit to Drink (Groundwood Books, 1995)
- The Convict Lover (Macfarlane Walter & Ross, 1996)
- Breakfast at the Exit Café (Greystone Books, 2010)
- A New Leaf: Growing With My Garden (Doubleday Canada, 2011)
- Gutenberg's Fingerprint: Paper, Pixels & the Lasting Impressions of Books (ECW Press, 2017)
- Woman, Watching: Louise de Kiriline Lawrence and the Songbirds of Pimisi Bay (ECW Press, 2022)

=== Fiction ===
- The Lion in the Room Next Door (McClelland and Stewart, 1999)
- The Holding (McClelland and Stewart, 2004)
- The Paradise Project (Thee Hellbox Press, 2012)
- Refuge (ECW Press, 2018)

=== As anthologist ===
- Gardens: A Literary Companion (Greystone Books, 2008)
- Night: A Literary Companion (Greystone Books, 2009)
