= Richard Greene (writer) =

Canadian poet

- Born: Richard Thomas Greene; July 17, 1961 (age 65); St. John's, Newfoundland and Labrador, Canada
- Education: University of Toronto
- Occupations: Poet; biographer; critic
- Writing career
- Period: 1984–present
- Notable works: Boxing the Compass, Selected Letters of Edith Sitwell
- Notable awards: Governor General's Award
- Movement: New Formalism

Richard Greene (born July 17, 1961) is a Canadian poet and professor at the University of Toronto Mississauga. His book Boxing the Compass won the Governor General's Award for English language poetry at the 2010 Governor General's Awards.

A resident of Toronto, Ontario, Greene graduated from Erindale College (now the Mississauga campus) of the University of Toronto.

He is the author of Edith Sitwell: Avant Garde Poet, English Genius., Virago (2012), and most recently (2020) The Unquiet Englishman: A Life of Graham Greene.
