= Agnès Gruda =

Canadian journalist

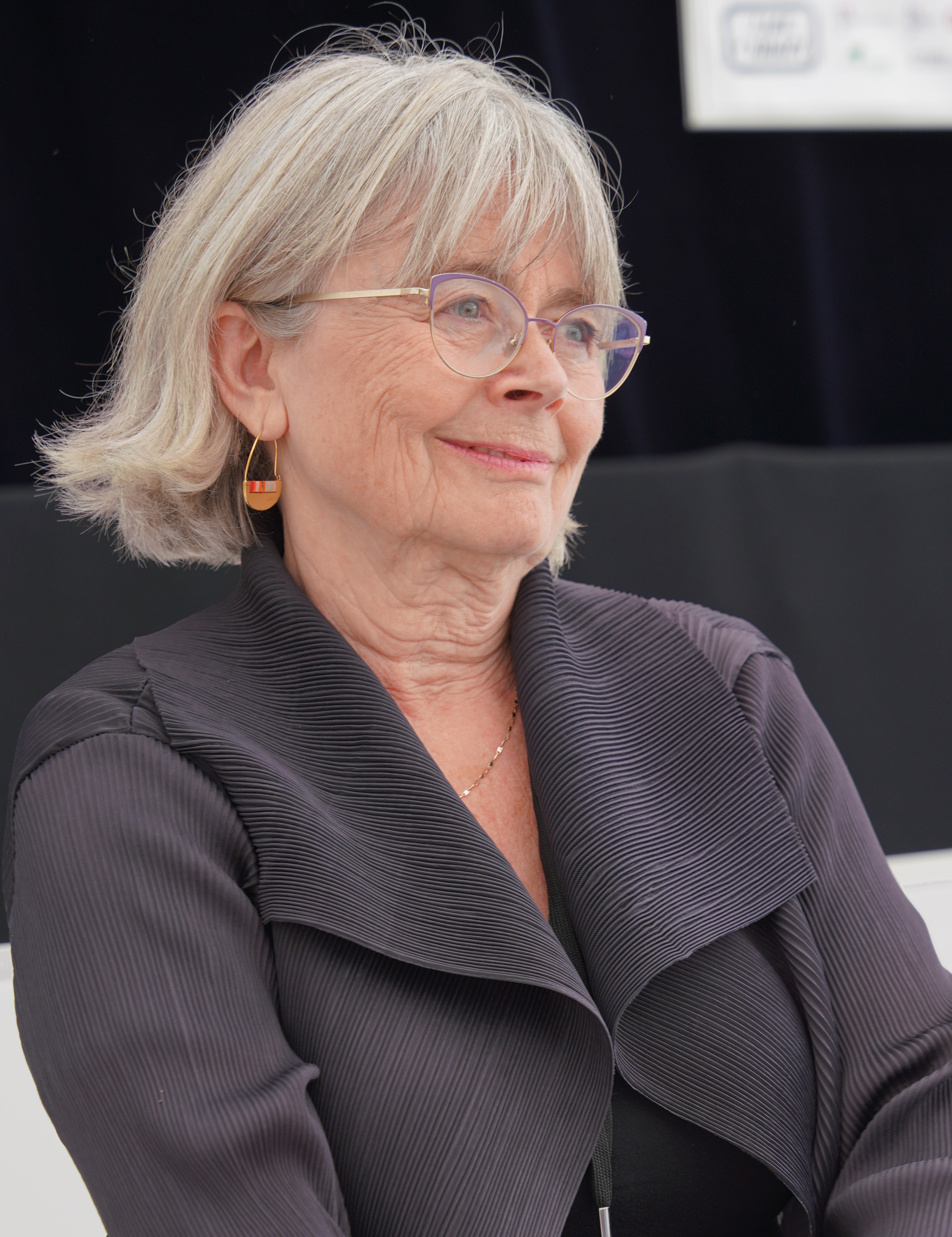
Agnès Gruda photographed in 2025.

Agnès Gruda is a Polish-born Canadian journalist and fiction writer. A foreign correspondent for La Presse, she won a National Newspaper Award in 2014 for her reporting on the Salafi movement.

Her debut short story collection Onze petites trahisons was a shortlisted finalist for the Governor General's Award for French-language fiction at the 2010 Governor General's Awards, and won Quebec's Prix Adrienne-Choquette. Her second short fiction collection, Mourir, mais pas trop, was published in 2016.

She is the sister of writer Joanna Gruda and journalist Alexandra Szacka.
