= Dawn Dumont =

Canadian writer

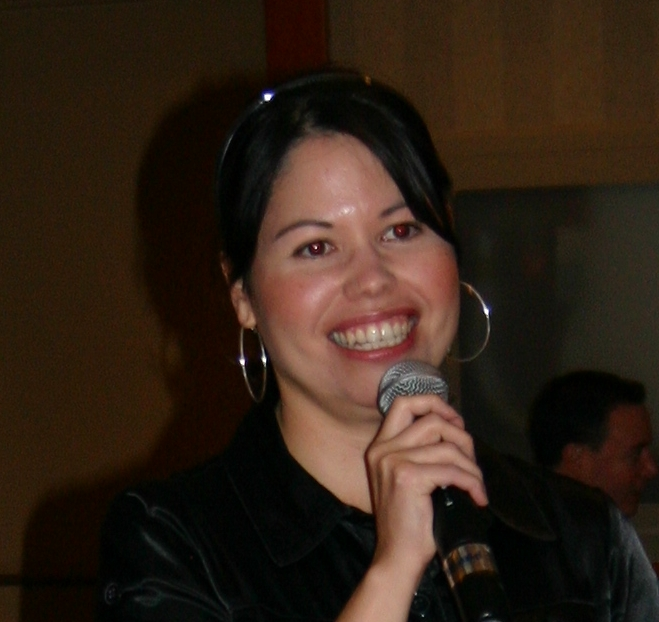
- Dawn Dumont in 2007
- Born: Dawn Marie Walker; 1973 or 1974 (age 52–53); Okanese First Nation
- Education: University of Saskatchewan (B.A.); Queen’s University (law)
- Writing career
- Pen name: Dawn Dumont; Dawn Dumont Walker

Dawn Marie Walker, better known by her pen name Dawn Dumont, is a Plains Cree writer, former lawyer, comedian, former CEO and journalist from the Okanese First Nation in Saskatchewan, Canada.

In 2022, she became the subject of nationwide attention when she was the subject of multiple criminal investigations across the United States and Canada after kidnapping her seven-year-old son and faking their death and disappearances. Walker became further mired in controversy as her heavy involvement in the FSIN's election fraud scandal came to light.

== Career ==
=== Writing ===
Her first book, Nobody Cries at Bingo (2011), is a fictionalized, humorous account of her own life growing up on a reserve. Dumont says that the book was inspired by the writing of David Sedaris. In 2012 it was shortlisted for an Alberta Readers' Choice Award and a Robert Kroetsch City of Edmonton Award, and selected for the Canadian Children's Book Centre's Best Books for Kids and Teens. In 2021, the French translation of the book (On pleure pas au bingo, translated by Daniel Grenier) was nominated for the Governor General's Award for English to French translation at the 2020 Governor General's Awards.

She followed up with Rose's Run (2014), the story of Rose Okanese, a single mother, who enters a marathon in an effort to boost her self-esteem. Writing in Pacific Rim Review of Books, Chuck Barker described the novel as "integral Canadian literature" and praised Dumont's "self-depreciating, honest, comprehensive, and confidential" sense of humour. This book won the 2015 Saskatchewan Book Award for Fiction.

In 2017 she changed formats, publishing a collection of short stories titled Glass Beads. In more than twenty stories, Dumont explores the relationships between four First Nations characters over a period of two decades. Shannon Webb-Campbell, reviewing the book in The Malahat Review, notes that "much like beadwork, each strand or story stands on its own, but can only be fully formed in relation to others." Glass Beads was shortlisted for four Saskatchewan Book Awards, including the Book of the Year Award and the Indigenous Peoples' Writing Award. It won the Fiction Award.

In 2022, her book, The Prairie Chicken Dance Tour, was shortlisted for the Stephen Leacock Memorial Medal for Humour. The announcement of the shortlist was made while Dumont was still considered a missing person. The award ultimately went to Rick Mercer.

Dumont teased a new book, Love Stories for the End of the World, during a livestream in February 2023. She finished writing the book while awaiting the outcome of her criminal charges.

In addition to her books, Dumont has performed as a stand-up comic and performed at the Comic Strip in New York. She was a story editor for the animated APTN program, By the Rapids, and she wrote regular columns in Eagle Feather News and the Saskatoon StarPhoenix hired Dumont as a twice monthly columnist in 2015.

== Federation of Sovereign Indigenous Nations ==
Dumont served as the Executive Operating Officer of the Federation of Sovereign Indigenous Nations, beginning in 2016 and was the longest-serving CEO in the organization's history.

=== Election fraud allegations ===
Myrna O'Soup, an election official hired by FSIN to run their 2021 elections, reported election fraud to authorities. She claims voting credentials were not protected and multiple votes were submitted through the same IP address. O'Soup also discovered that Walker could see every voter's ballot choices, contrary to the confidentiality FSIN's members expected. When O'Soup raised these concerns she claimed Dawn Walker threatened her. As of 2025, the court case is still ongoing and the FSIN sued O'Soup, claiming defamation.

== Personal life ==
Dumont was born and raised on the Okanese First Nation. She earned a Bachelor of Arts degree in English from the University of Saskatchewan in 1995. She holds a law degree from Queen's University.

She has one son.

=== Political candidate ===
In 2021, Dumont, as Dawn Dumont Walker, ran as a candidate for the federal Liberal Party in Saskatoon's Saskatoon-University riding. She lost but received ten percent of the vote.

2021 Canadian federal election: Saskatoon—University
Party	Candidate	Votes	%	±%	Expenditures
Conservative	Corey Tochor	20,389	48.0	-4.13	$49,119.86
New Democratic	Claire Card	15,042	35.4	+5.64	$64,131.11
Liberal	Dawn Dumont Walker	4,608	10.8	-2.27	$28,794.80
People's	Guto Penteado	1,778	4.2	+2.78	$7,791.19
Green	North-Marie Hunter	405	1.0	-1.98	$200.47
Christian Heritage	Carl A. Wesolowski	195	0.5	-0.15	$4,979.31
Communist	Jeremy Fisher	100	0.2	–	$0.00
Total valid votes/expense limit		42,517	99.31	–	$103,229.52
Total rejected ballots		294	0.69	+0.12	
Turnout		42,811	69.17	-7.1	
Eligible voters		61,894			
Conservative hold		Swing		-4.89	
Source: Elections Canada

=== Disappearance and criminal charges ===
On July 24, 2022, Dumont and her seven-year-old son were reported missing after Dumont's vehicle and personal items were found empty near Saskatoon's Chief Whitecap Park. Dumont's friends were especially concerned as she had two pets that had been locked inside for days. Several investigations were launched, including by the RCMP. The Federation of Sovereign Indigenous Nations issued an amber alert for the child on social media.

During the investigation, Dumont's friends and family heavily implied foul play. FSIN Vice Chief Heather Bear alleged that Dumont had previously been a victim of domestic violence. However, Bear did not make any formal allegations. Eleanore Sunchild, a friend of Dumont, also noted that Dumont had reported allegations of violence in her previous relationship to the police, who she claims did nothing. Sunchild is quoted saying Dumont's disappearance was "totally out of character".

While Dumont was considered missing, a rally and a candlelight vigil were held in Saskatchewan to grieve and support the community. Dumont had been an advocate for missing and murdered Indigenous women and girls and her disappearance was linked with that particular human rights crisis. The Jansen family set up a GoFundMe campaign to help with search costs. After Dumont and her son were found, donations were capped; all unused funds were donated to help support other families of missing children.

On August 5, 2022, following a joint investigation by Saskatoon Police Service and Homeland Security, Dumont and her son were found at a "rental unit" in Oregon City, Oregon after allegedly illegally crossing the Canada-US border. Court documents filed in Oregon alleged that Dumont faked her death and that of her son in what they describe as an elaborate scheme to illegally enter the country.

The U.S. Department of Homeland Security has charged her with the felony offence of knowingly producing a passport of another person and a misdemeanour charge of possessing identification that was stolen or produced illegally. She was also charged with aggravated identity theft. In Canada, she is charged with parental abduction and public mischief. If the American authorities were to drop identity theft charges, Dumont could then face that charge in Canada, where the alleged identity theft occurred.

Dumont's friends and family have urged compassion, claiming the situation is complex and requires patience. Idle No More launched a GoFundMe campaign to help fund Dumont's legal expenses. While detained in the US, Dumont made a statement claiming that she left because she feared for her and her son's safety. She also cited previous domestic abuse allegations against her ex, which she claims were not taken seriously by Saskatchewan police. Police, in turn, said they had investigated the abuse claims but found no evidence to corroborate her allegations. Critics of Dumont state Jansen had never been charged with abuse and note she tried to move away from Jansen three times in the four years since their relationship ended, and also claim she made domestic abuse allegations only to gain advantage in her custody battle. Jansen later told the court that he feared for his safety and believed he had to move during the ordeal.

Dumont appeared in court in Oregon on September 7, 2022. Following hearings in the United States, an informal agreement was reached that would have American authorities transfer Dumont to Canadian authorities without a formal extradition process. Her son is with his father in Canada.

On August 29, 2022, Dumont made her first appearance in court in Saskatchewan where she was represented by prominent criminal defence lawyer, Marie Henein. At an FSIN news conference that day, several women spoke in favor of Dumont and critiqued the legal system, restating claims that Dumont is a survivor of domestic violence. The women who spoke asserted that Dumont should be released from custody. A support rally was held prior to that hearing outside of the courthouse. Supporters reiterated their wishes that Dumont be released from custody, though the Crown maintains their opposition to her release. She was granted bail in September 2022. Her US court appearance has been postponed in light of her charges in Canada.

Dumont was released into house arrest on September 2, 2022, following her bail hearing. On November 15 she was arrested on new charges in relation to identity theft, fraud and forgery. Dumont elected to proceed with a trial by judge and waived her right to a preliminary hearing. She pleaded not guilty to all charges (public mischief, parental abduction and identity fraud) in January 2023.

In March 2023, Dumont's defense counsel filed an application to seek third-party records that they claim would help show Walker's rights were violated, under the Canadian Charter of Rights and Freedoms, enough to warrant a stay of proceedings. Her legal team claimed Walker was subject to human rights violations both as an individual and systemically as an Indigenous woman. In hearings in August, Judge Bruce Bauer ruled that some, but not all, of the records were relevant to the defense and should be released. The court also heard that the resources to search for Dumont and her son cost upwards of $100,000.

On November 2, 2023, Dumont pleaded guilty to three of the charges against her. She was sentenced to a one-year conditional sentence in the community and 18 months' probation. She will not have unsupervised visits with her son.

== Works ==
- Nobody Cries at Bingo. Thistledown Press. 2011. ISBN 9781897235843.
  - On pleure pas au bingo (in French). Translated by Grenier, Daniel. Éditions Hannenorak. 2019. ISBN 9782923926407.
- Rose's Run. Thistledown Press. 2014. ISBN 9781927068816.
  - La course de Rose (in French). Translated by Grenier, Daniel. Éditions Hannenorak. 2020. ISBN 9782923926513.
- Glass Beads. Thistledown Press. 2017. ISBN 9781771871273.
  - Perles de verre (in French). Translated by Grenier, Daniel. Éditions Hannenorak. 2021. ISBN 9782923926803.
- The Prairie Chicken Dance Tour. Freehand Books. 2021. ISBN 9781988298870.
  - Les poules des prairies partent en tournée (in French). Translated by Grenier, Daniel. Éditions Hannenorak. 2022. ISBN 9782925118121.

== See also ==
- List of solved missing person cases (2020s)
