= Gideon Byamugisha =

Ugandan activist, Anglican priest

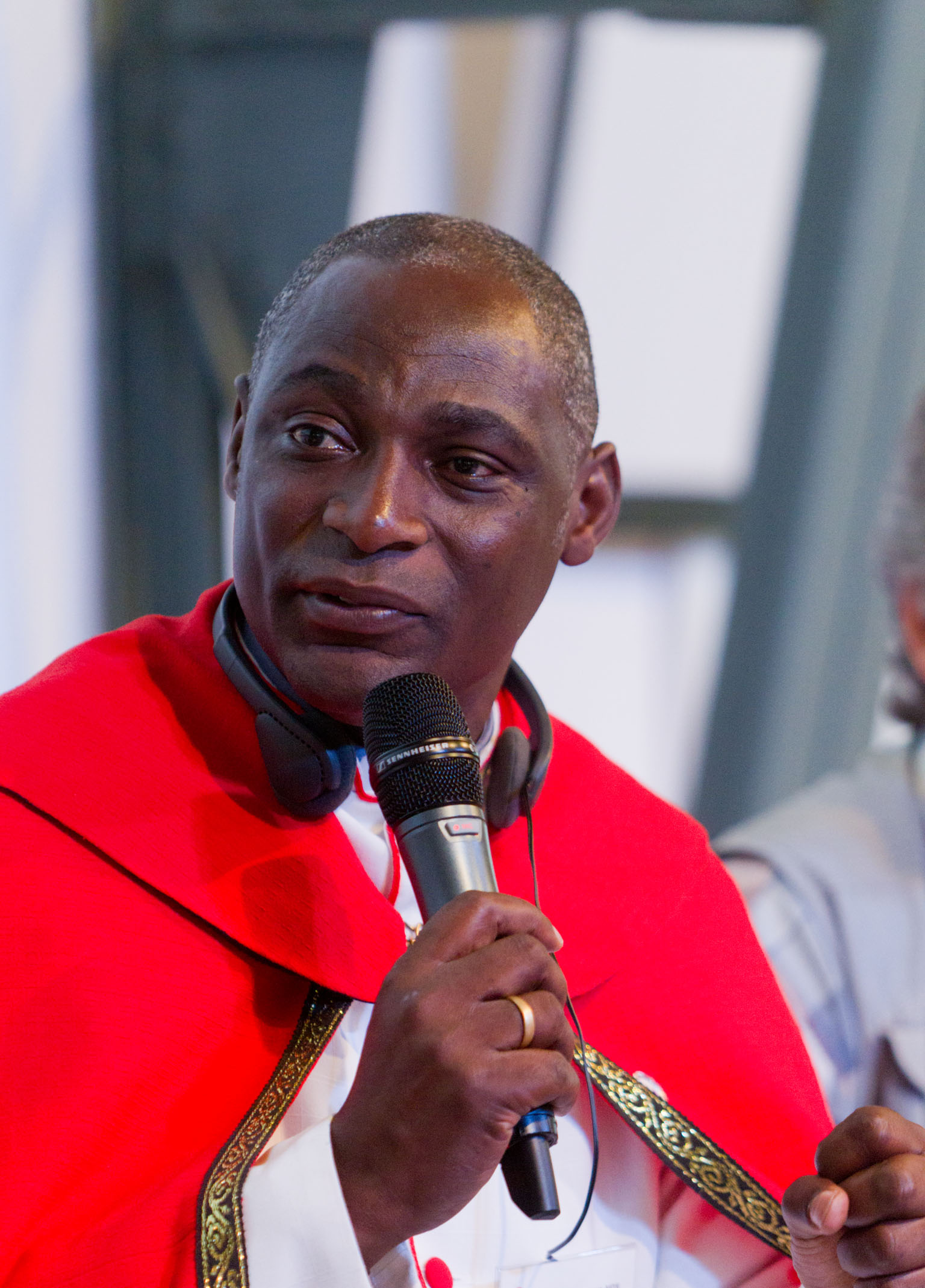
image added

Reverend Canon Gideon Byamugisha (born 1959) is an Anglican priest in Uganda with a parish outside of Kampala. In 1992, he became the first religious leader in Africa to publicly announce that he was HIV positive. In 2009, Byamugisha received the 26th annual Niwano Peace Prize "in recognition of his work to uphold the dignity and human rights of people living with HIV/AIDS".

Byamugisha co-founded the African Network of Religious Leaders Living with and Personally Affected HIV and Aids (ANERELA+) in February 2002, and in 2006 started a shelter for orphans whose parents died from AIDS. He lives with his wife and three HIV negative children.

== Early life ==
Byamugisha is from Kigezi, near the Ugandan border with Rwanda, the eldest of fourteen children. He was a history and geography teacher, as well as a deputy headmaster, before beginning his theology studies in his twenties. He was most interested in the philosophy of religion.

In 1990, Byamugisha's first wife Kellen gave birth to his daughter, Patience, and both parents had been accepted to study at graduate programs in Britain. These plans changed when Kellen developed chest pains in April 1991, dying a week later. Six months later, Byamugisha learned that his wife had died of AIDS.

Byamugisha does not know where he contracted the virus. He and his wife were not tested before their marriage, and in 1988 he had been in a serious bicycling accident which required injections and a blood transfusion at a time when medical supplies and blood were not routinely screened for HIV.

== Coping with HIV ==
Although there was a possibility that he would lose his job because of the stigma associated with AIDS, Byamugisha decided to tell the principal of the college he worked at and other staff members about his condition. Although they were supportive of him, they asked him not to tell others. He began telling his students, and then other members of his church. He considers this to have been a risky choice, as community members were often worried that this would harm the image of the church.

Byamugisha claims that he never felt guilty about his status. "The only regret I have is that I lacked information. I have all this education—two degrees, one first class—but I failed a HIV test." However, in 1996 he fell ill and lost 40 pounds because he had no access to antiretroviral drugs (ARVs). Told that he would only live 6 months without ARVs, the bishop of Kampala used the church network to find two donors (an American and a Singaporean) who began sending him the drugs in 1997.

== ANERELA+ ==
As he started to travel and speak about his condition, Byamugisha began encountering other religious leaders who were HIV infected, or personally affected by the death and illness of family members, but were not ready to publicly discuss their conditions. At the time, there was much misinformation about AIDS and HIV in Africa, and because of the promises and edicts from Christian, Muslim and Hindu groups on the continent, to have a religious leader infected or even affected personally was unthinkable.

In 1998, Byamugisha began to feel the need to organise the religious community with personal ties to HIV/AIDS. In 2002, he secured funds to host a meeting of the religious leaders who had come to him privately in the past, and 42 leaders met with him in the Collins Hotel, in Nyanga Hills, some 300 km outside Harare. Eight of the participants were HIV+, and this group later became the African Network of Religious Leaders Living with and Personally Affected HIV and Aids (ANERELA+), and grew to more than 2000 members in 39 countries by the end of 2006.

== Other HIV/AIDS advocacy ==
Byamugisha has become prominent in the international HIV/AIDS community. He has worked as an advisor to World Vision and has travelled internationally to speak about HIV/AIDS, including to a conference at the US White House in December 2002. Byamugisha advocates the view that HIV related issues reveal problems in other areas of society, such as poverty, literacy rates, social inequality, gender relations, trade, and government policy. Fixing these issues, he claims, will have a significant effect on the AIDS epidemic in Africa.

Major issues Byamugisha sees in charity organisations include their insistence on policies that match the domestic agendas of donor agencies rather than accept the realities of society in Africa. While the Catholic Church and other religious communities had softened their stance on condom usage and AIDS education in Africa, organisations such as the President's Emergency Plan for AIDS Relief (PEPFAR), the biggest donor in Uganda, continued to insist on education about abstinence or delay of sexual debut for young people, and on fidelity or partner reduction for most adults, two interventions Byamugisha has been critical of as "stigmatizing" to those who cannot or will not abstain or be faithful to one partner. He also criticised PEPFAR's use of non-generic HIV drugs. In the first year of operation, PEPFAR insisted that only brand-name HIV drugs be used, though they are five times more expensive than the generic brands, and, Byamugisha pointed out, can only be used to treat five times fewer people. Byamugisha blamed the private agendas of the US pharmaceutical industry and the US evangelical Christian lobby for such policies which do not resonate with the realities of Africa.

Byamugisha also collaborated in 2003 with photographer Gideon Mendel on the book A Broken Landscape: HIV & AIDS in Africa.

== Family ==
Byamugisha lives with his HIV positive wife Pamela (who runs a hardware store), with one HIV negative daughter from his previous marriage, Patience, and two HIV negative daughters, Love and Gift, whom he had with Pamela. The couple decided to have Love and Gift after drugs to prevent transmission of the virus from mother to child became available in 2000.

== See also ==
- 28: Stories of AIDS in Africa – A book containing Byamugisha's story
- HIV/AIDS in Uganda
