= Melanie Siebert =

Canadian poet

Melanie Siebert is a Canadian poet. Her first book Deepwater Vee was a shortlisted nominee for the Governor General's Award for English language poetry at the 2010 Governor General's Awards. Siebert is well known as a backcountry guide in Northern Canada and has been awarded the prestigious Berton House Residency, located in Pierre Berton's childhood home in Dawson City, Yukon.

Siebert has an MFA from the University of Victoria.
