= Harold R. Johnson =

Canadian lawyer and writer (1954–2022)

- Born: August 30, 1954; Prince Albert, Saskatchewan, Canada
- Died: February 9, 2022 (aged 67); Mount Forest, Ontario
- Occupations: Lawyer, writer
- Writing career
- Notable works: Firewater: How Alcohol Is Killing My People (And Yours) (2016); Peace and Good Order: The Case for Indigenous Justice in Canada (2019); The Power of Story: On Truth, the Trickster, and New Fictions for a New Era (2022)

Harold R. Johnson (August 30, 1954 – February 9, 2022) was a Canadian indigenous lawyer and writer, whose book Firewater: How Alcohol Is Killing My People (And Yours) was a shortlisted nominee for the Governor General's Award for English-language non-fiction at the 2016 Governor General's Awards. The book, an examination of the problem with alcohol consumption among Canadian First Nations, draws on Johnson's work as a Crown prosecutor in northern Saskatchewan.

Johnson told CBC Radio interviewer Shelagh Rogers in 2016 that his father was a Swedish immigrant and his mother a Cree woman in Saskatchewan, where he was born. He enlisted in the Royal Canadian Navy and worked as a logger, trapper and miner before going to university as an adult, completing his education in law with an MA at Harvard. He was a member of the Montreal Lake Cree Nation.

After being diagnosed with stage IV lung cancer, Johnson died on February 9, 2022, at the age of 67. His twelfth and final book, The Power of Story was released posthumously in October 2022.

Daniel Grenier received a Governor General's Award nomination for English to French translation at the 2024 Governor General's Awards, for his translation of Johnson's Charlie Muskrat.

== Bibliography ==
=== Fiction ===
- Billy Tinker, Saskatoon, Sask.: Thistledown Press, 2001.
- Back Track, Saskatoon, Sask.: Thistledown Press, 2005.
- Charlie Muskrat, Saskatoon, Sask.: Thistledown Press, 2008.
- The Cast Stone, Saskatoon, Sask.: Thistledown Press, 2011.
- Corvus, Saskatoon, Sask.: Thistledown Press, 2015.
- The Björkan Sagas, Toronto: Anansi, 2021.

=== Nonfiction ===
- Two Families: Treaties and Government, Saskatoon, Sask.: Purich Publishing, 2007.
- Firewater: How Alcohol is Killing My People (and Yours), Regina, Sask.: Univ of Regina Press, 2016.
- Clifford: a Memoir, a Fiction, a Fantasy, a Thought Experiment, Toronto: Anansi, 2018.
- Peace and Good Order: The Case for Indigenous Justice in Canada, Toronto: McClelland & Stewart, 2019.
- Cry Wolf: Inquest into the True Nature of a Predator, Regina, Sask.: Univ of Regina Press, 2020.
- The Power of Story: On Truth, the Trickster, and New Fictions for a New Era, Windsor, Ont.: Biblioasis, 2022.
