= Daniel Grenier =

Canadian writer from Quebec (born 1980)

- Born: 1980 (age 45–46); Brossard, Quebec
- Occupations: novelist, translator
- Writing career
- Period: 2010s-present
- Notable work: L’année la plus longue

Daniel Grenier (born 1980) is a Canadian writer from Quebec, who was a shortlisted nominee for the Governor General's Award for French-language fiction at the 2016 Governor General's Awards for his debut novel, L’année la plus longue.

A graduate of the Université du Québec à Montréal, he published the short story collection Malgré tout on rit à Saint-Henri in 2012. In 2014, he published Douce détresse, a French translation of Anna Leventhal's short story collection Sweet Affliction.

His non-fiction book La solitude de l'écrivain de fond was shortlisted for the Governor General's Award for French-language non-fiction at the 2017 Governor General's Awards. He is also a four-time nominee for the Governor General's Award for English to French translation, receiving nods at the 2018 Governor General's Awards for his translation of Andrew Forbes's The Utility of Boredom: Baseball Essays, at the 2020 Governor General's Awards for his translation of Dawn Dumont's Nobody Cries at Bingo, at the 2021 Governor General's Awards for his translation of Dumont's Rose's Run, and at the 2024 Governor General's Awards for his translation of Harold R. Johnson's Charlie Muskrat.

Originally from Brossard, he currently resides in Quebec City.

== Works ==
- Malgré tout on rit à Saint-Henri (2012)
- L’année la plus longue (2015)
- La solitude de l'écrivain de fond. Notes sur Wright Morris. Le Quartanier, 2017 (Shortlisted 2017 Governor General's Awards, non-fiction)
- On pleure pas au bingo (2019) Translator. Éditions Hannenorak. (Shortlisted 2020 Governor General's Awards, English to French translation)
