= Michael Harris (poet) =

Canadian poet and translator (born 1944)

Michael Harris (born 1944 in Glasgow, Scotland) is a Canadian poet and translator. His book Circus was a shortlisted nominee for the Governor General's Award for English language poetry at the 2010 Governor General's Awards.

He has taught at McGill University, Concordia University and Dawson College.

== Works ==
=== Poetry ===
- Poems from Ritual (1967)
- Text for Nausikaa (1970)
- Sparks (1976)
- Grace (1978)
- Miss Emily et la Mort (1985)
- In Transit (1985)
- New and Selected Poems (1992)
- Circus (2010)
- The Gamekeeper : Selected Poems 1976-2011 (2017)

=== Anthologies ===
- Ten Montreal Poets (1975)
- The Signal Anthology of Contemporary Canadian Poetry (1993)

=== Translations ===
- Veiled Countries/Lives: Poetry of Marie-Claire Blais (1984)
