= Alexandra Szacka =

Canadian television journalist

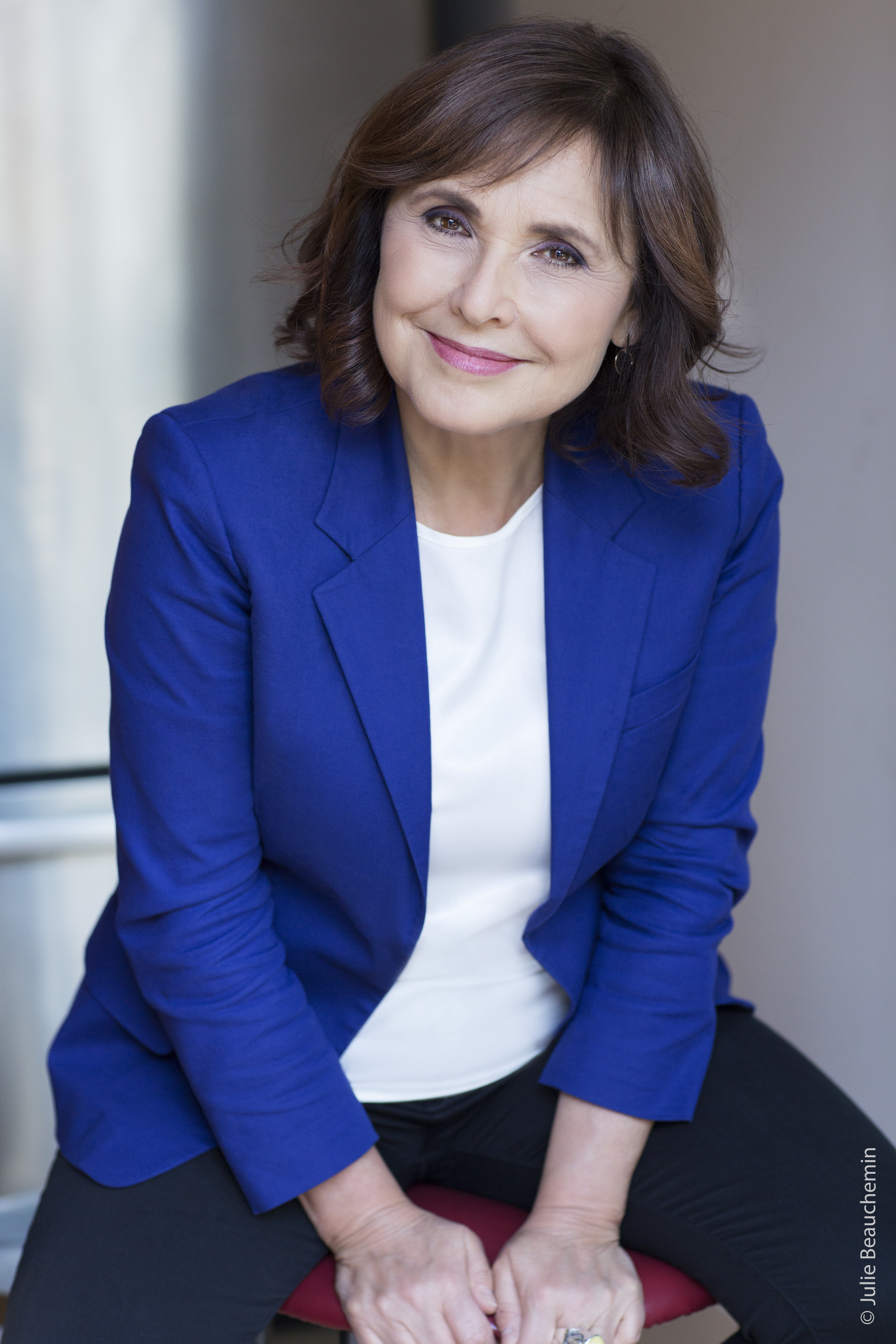
- Occupation: television journalist

Alexandra Szacka is a Canadian television journalist, who has been a foreign correspondent for CBC News in both the English and French divisions. She has been the network's correspondent in New York City, Moscow and Paris.

Szacka's career began at Radio-Québec and has earned her numerous awards, including the Prix Judith-Jasmin and a Prix Gémeaux. She earned a master's degree in anthropology from Université Laval and is fluent in five languages: English, French, Spanish, Polish and Russian.

Born in Poland, she is the sister of writer Joanna Gruda and journalist Agnès Gruda.
