= Kamal Al-Solaylee =

Canadian journalist (born 1964)

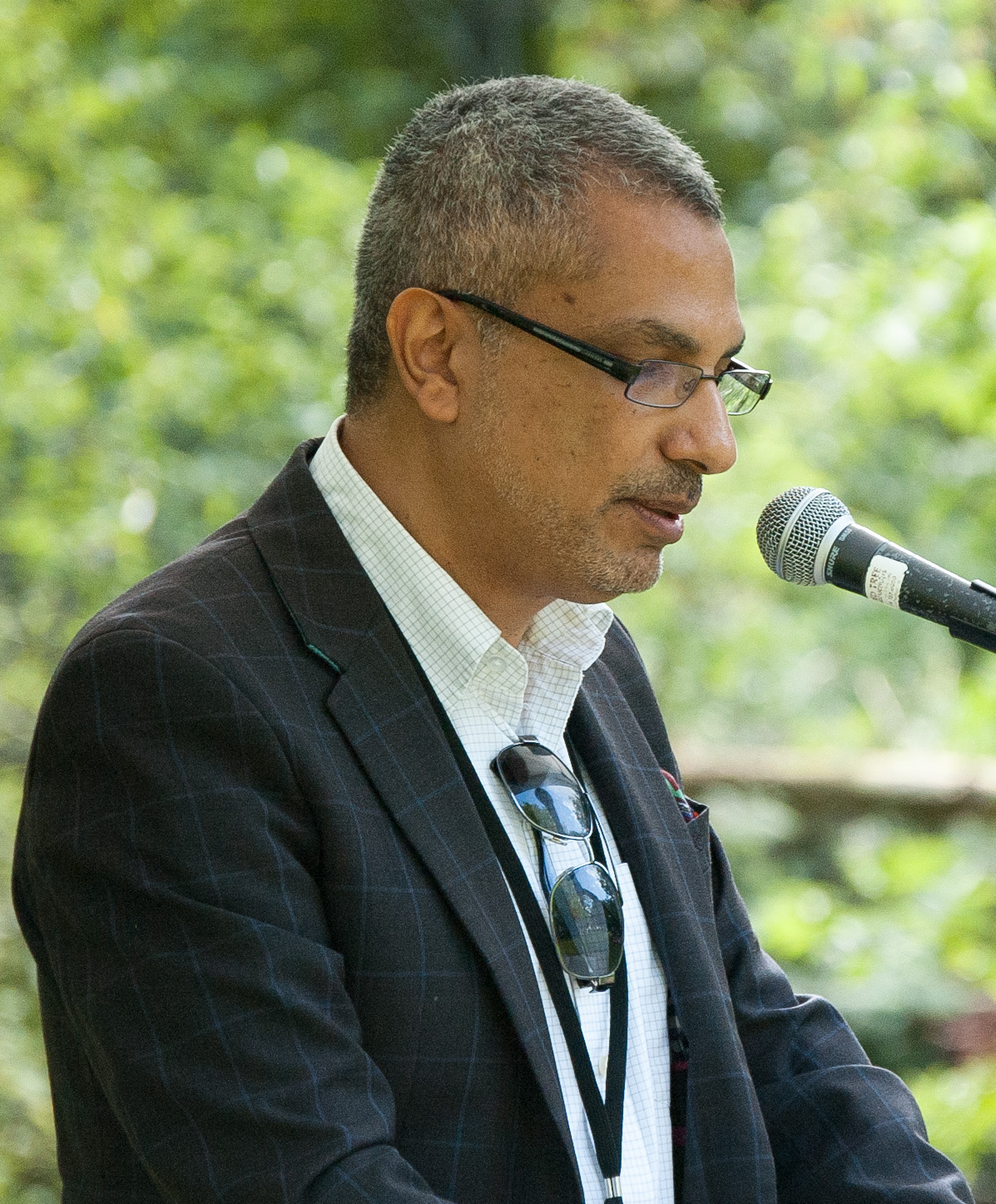
- Al-Solaylee at the Eden Mills Writers' Festival in 2016
- Born: Aden, Yemen
- Occupations: Writer, journalist
- Writing career
- Period: 2000s-present
- Notable work: Intolerable: A Memoir of Extremes

Kamal Al-Solaylee (born 1964) is a Canadian journalist, who published his debut book, Intolerable: A Memoir of Extremes, in 2012. He is currently director of the School of Journalism, Writing, and Media at Canada's University of British Columbia.

Born in Aden, his family went into exile in Beirut and Cairo following the British decolonization of Yemen in 1967. Following a brief return to Yemen in his 20s, Al-Solaylee moved to London to complete his PhD in English, before moving to Canada.

He has worked extensively as a journalist in Canada, including work for The Globe and Mail, Report on Business, the Toronto Star, the National Post, The Walrus, Xtra! and Toronto Life.

His book Intolerable: A Memoir of Extremes is a memoir of his experience as a gay man growing up in the Middle East. The book was a shortlisted nominee for the 2012 Hilary Weston Writers' Trust Prize for Nonfiction, the 2013 Lambda Literary Award in the Gay Memoir/Biography category, and the 2013 Toronto Book Award.

He served on the jury of the 2012 Dayne Ogilvie Prize, a literary award for emerging LGBT writers in Canada, selecting Amber Dawn as that year's winner. He is on the jury for the 2018 Scotiabank Giller Prize.

Intolerable was selected for the 2015 edition of Canada Reads, where it was defended by actress Kristin Kreuk.

His second book, Brown: What Being Brown in the World Today Means (To Everyone), was published in 2016. The book was a shortlisted nominee for the Governor General's Award for English-language non-fiction at the 2016 Governor General's Awards, and won the 2017 Shaughnessy Cohen Prize for Political Writing.

In his third book Return: Why We Go Back to Where We Come From, published in 2021, Al-Solaylee, describes his yearning to go back to Yemen, interviewing dozens of people who also wish to return to their country of origin.
