= Geneviève Pettersen =

Canadian writer from Quebec (born 1982)

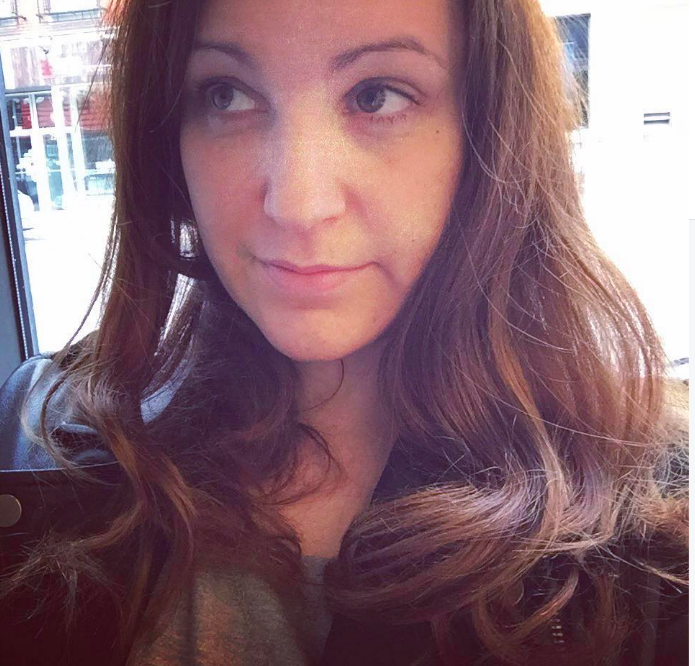
- Geneviève Pettersen in 2016
- Born: 1982 (age 43–44); Wendake, Quebec, Canada
- Occupation: writer
- Writing career
- Period: 2010s-present
- Notable work: La déesse des mouches à feu
- Notable awards: 2015 Grand Prix littéraire Archambault

Geneviève Pettersen (born 1982) is a Canadian writer from Quebec. Her debut novel, La déesse des mouches à feu (2014), was awarded the Grand Prix littéraire Archambault.

== Biography ==
Pettersen was born in Wendake, Quebec, 1982.

She wrote "Madame Chose", a lifestyle and food blog and column for La Presse. In 2014, she published Vie et mort du couple : du dating au divorce, de Madame Chose, a collection of her Madame Chose writing about relationships.

Her debut novel La déesse des mouches à feu was published in 2014. The novel won the Grand Prix littéraire Archambault in 2015, and its English translation by Neil Smith, The Goddess of Fireflies, was a shortlisted nominee for the Governor General's Award for French to English translation at the 2016 Governor General's Awards. La déesse des mouches à feu was adapted by film director Anaïs Barbeau-Lavalette for the 2020 film Goddess of the Fireflies.

Pettersen also wrote for Le Journal de Montréal and hosted radio shows for Cogeco Media and Quebecor's QUB.

She was the Coalition Avenir Québec candidate for L'Assomption in the 2026 Quebec general election.

Pettersen was formerly married to writer Samuel Archibald.
