= Sandy Pool =

Canadian poet, editor and professor

Sandy Pool is a Canadian poet, editor and professor of creative writing. She is the author of two full-length poetry collections and a chapbook published by Vallum Editions. Her first collection, Exploding Into Night (Guernica Editions) was a shortlisted nominee for the Governor General's Award for English language poetry at the 2010 Governor General's Awards.

Her second full-length collection, Undark: An Oratorio (Nightwood Editions) was nominated for a Trillium Book Award for the best book of poetry in the province of Ontario, an Alberta Book Award and the Toronto Emerging Artist award administered by the Toronto Arts Foundation. A selection from Undark: An Oratorio was also printed in The Best Canadian Poems 2011, published by Tightrope Books. Sandy also writes for the screen and the stage. Her most recent project, a series of librettos were performed by Tapestry New Opera Works in Toronto, and featured on NPR radio.

Her writing has been translated into French, Spanish and Japanese, and appears in more than 50 magazines, journals and anthologies in the United States, Canada, Australia and Japan. Some of these publications include The Cordite Poetry Review, Ploughshares, The Fiddlehead, Grain, Arc Magazine, and The Capilano Review.

Her writing has been honored with residencies at The Corporation of Yaddo, The Banff Center For Arts and Creativity, and the Sage Hill Writing Experience. She has also held writer-in-residence fellowships at the Berton House Writer's Retreat, The Saskatchewan Writer's Guild, The Atlantic Center for the Arts and numerous other institutions. Her other honors include a Whiting Foundation Fellowship, three grants from the Canada Council For the Arts, 20 Ontario Arts Council grants, a Killam Scholarship in Poetics, a SSHRC doctoral scholarship, a Queen Elizabeth II Doctoral fellowship, the Emeritus Professors of English Award, the Sharon Drummond Scholarship in Creative Writing, The Constance Rooke Scholarship in Creative Writing, and The Arthur Lindsey Fernie Scholarship in Drama.

She has taught English and Creative Writing at a variety of post-secondary institutions in Canada and the United States including St. Bonaventure University, The University of Toronto, The University of Calgary, Sheridan College, Humber College and at The Writer's Guild of Alberta, University of Calgary, and New College of Florida, and as and an online instructor in Creative Writing at the University of Toronto. She was the visiting Writer in Residence at New College of Florida and a postdoctoral scholar in Creative Writing at Brown University in Rhode Island.

Currently, she is a professor of Creative Writing at the University of East Anglia, England.

== See also ==
- Canadian literature
- Canadian poetry
- List of Canadian poets
