= Neil Smith (writer) =

Canadian writer and translator

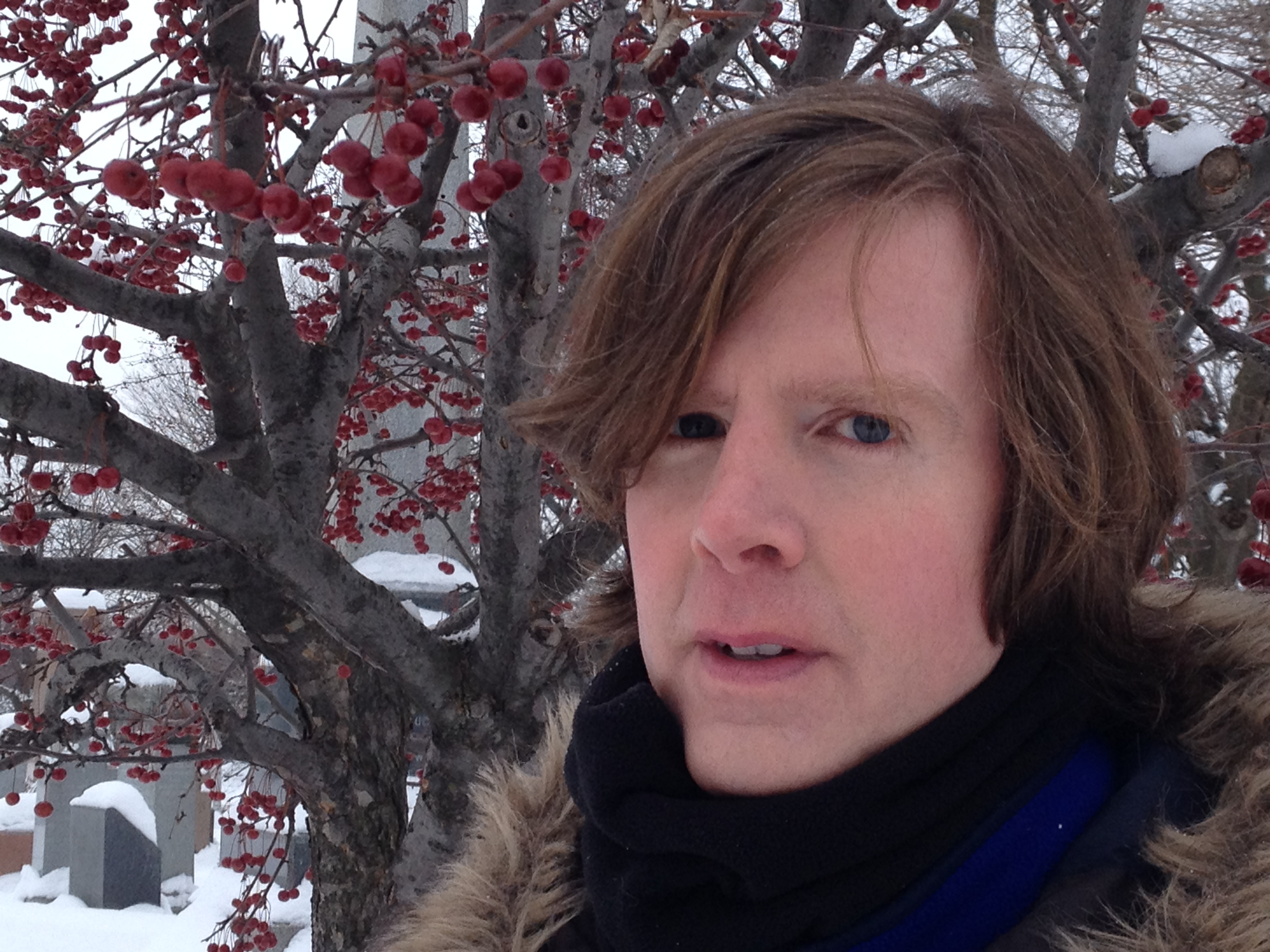
- Born: 1964 (age 61–62); Montreal, Quebec
- Occupation: writer
- Writing career
- Period: 2000s-present
- Notable works: Bang Crunch, Boo, Jones
- Notable awards: Hugh MacLennan Prize for Fiction

Neil Smith (born 1964) is a Canadian writer and translator from Montreal, Quebec. His novel Boo, published in 2015, won the Hugh MacLennan Prize for Fiction. Boo was also nominated for a Sunburst Award and the Canadian Library Association Young Adult Book Award, and was longlisted for the Prix des libraires du Québec.

Smith published his debut book, the short story collection Bang Crunch, in 2007. It was chosen as a best book of the year by the Washington Post and The Globe and Mail, won the McAuslan First Book Prize from the Quebec Writers' Federation, and was a finalist for the Hugh MacLennan Prize for Fiction. Three stories in the book were also nominated for the Journey Prize.

Smith also has a degree in translation and translates from French to English. The Goddess of Fireflies, his translation of Geneviève Pettersen's novel La déesse des mouches à feu, was nominated for the Governor General's Award for French to English translation at the 2016 Governor General's Awards.

His newest book of fiction, the novel Jones, was released in August 2022. It is the harrowing story of a pair of siblings attempting to survive the horror show of their family. It, too, was nominated for the Hugh MacLennan Prize for Fiction.

== Literary translations ==
- Geneviève Pettersen, The Goddess of Fireflies, Véhicule Press, 2016.
- Jean-Philippe Baril Guérard, You Crushed It, Book*hug, 2025.
- Jean-Christophe Réhel, All Kidding Aside, QC Fiction, 2025.
