= Paul Gagné (translator) =

Canadian literary translator (born 1961)

- Occupation: Literary translator

Paul Gagné (born 1961) is a Canadian literary translator currently working in Montreal, Quebec, Canada. With his wife Lori Saint-Martin, he has translated over seventy English language books into French, including the works of authors such as Maya Angelou, Margaret Atwood and Naomi Klein. He holds a master's degree in French literature from Laval University.

== Works ==
Before turning to the world of literary translation, Gagné worked as a translator for several years in Toronto and Montréal. He is a member of the Literary Translators' Association of Canada and of the Association of Translators and Interpreters of Ontario. Below is a list of selected works that he has translated in collaboration with Lori Saint-Martin:

- 2008 - Tant que je serai noire (Maya Angelou, The Heart of a Woman)
- 2008 - La Stratégie du choc (Naomi Klein, The Shock Doctrine)
- 2008 - 28 (Stephanie Nolen, 28)
- 2006 - Contre-la-montre : combattre le sida en Afrique (Stephen Lewis, Race Against Time: Searching for Hope in AIDS-Ravaged Africa)
- 2006 - Cibles mouvantes : essais 1971-2004 (Margaret Atwood, Moving Targets: Writing with Intent, 1982–2004)
- 2005 - L’Odyssée de Pénéloppe (Margaret Atwood, The Penelopiad)
- 2001 - La Perte et le fracas (Alistair MacLeod, No Great Mischief)

== Awards and recognition ==
Paul Gagné and Lori Saint-Martin have been jointly awarded several translation prizes throughout their career. These include the John Glassco Translation Prize in 1993, the QWF Translation Prize in 2004, 2006 and 2008 and the Governor General's Award in 2000, 2007 and 2015. They have also been shortlisted for a Governor General's Award an additional twelve times.
