= Tree: A Life Story =

2004 book by David Suzuki

- Author: David Suzuki & Wayne Grady
- Illustrator: Robert Bateman
- Language: English
- Subject: Nature
- Genre: Non-fiction
- Publisher: Greystone Books
- Publication date: September 2004
- Publication place: Canada
- Media type: Print (hard and paperback)
- Pages: 192
- ISBN: 978-1-55365-016-4
- OCLC: 55682161
- Dewey Decimal: 582.16 22
- LC Class: QK494.5.P66 S89 2004

Tree: A Life Story (or Tree: A Biography in Australia) is a Canadian non-fiction book written by David Suzuki and Wayne Grady, and illustrated by Robert Bateman. The book profiles the life of a Douglas-fir tree, from seed to maturity to death. The story provides ecological context by describing interactions with other lifeforms in the forest and historical context through parallels with world events that occur during the tree's 700 years of life. Digressions from the biographical narrative, scattered throughout the book, provide background into related topics, such as the history of botany.

Suzuki was inspired to write a biography of a tree when he noticed a Douglas-fir with an uncharacteristic curve in its trunk and speculated what caused it to grow into that shape. Suzuki studied the topic with the help of a research assistant and solicited Grady to help write the book. Vancouver publishers Greystone Books released the book in September 2004. In the Canadian market, it peaked at number three in the Maclean's and the National Post's non-fiction best seller lists and was nominated for several awards. In February 2005 it was published in Australia by Allen & Unwin. The premise and writing were well received by critics. While several reviewers found that the authors succeeded in using accessible language, others found it too technical.

== Background ==
Inspiration for the book came from a Douglas-fir tree with a curve in its trunk. While sitting by the tree, at his home on Quadra Island, near Vancouver, David Suzuki realized that even though his family had played on it for years, he did not know how old it was or how its uncharacteristic curve had developed. Suzuki, a science writer and broadcaster, and former zoologist, speculated that the soil might have slid when the tree was young or that another plant might have blocked the sunlight. He thought that the tree must have endured much hardship throughout its life and made a connection between biographies of people and the story of this tree's life. It also reminded him of an idea he had for a children's book about interconnectivity of life, especially within plants. Along with a research assistant, he studied the topic. Suzuki started to write a draft but a busy schedule interfered so he sought a collaborator. Science writer and former Harrowsmith editor Wayne Grady agreed to participate. Suzuki provided the research, framework, and some original writing and Grady did most of the writing. Together, Grady in Ontario and Suzuki in Vancouver, went through five drafts. Wildlife artist Robert Bateman was brought into the project through social connections between the wives of Bateman and Suzuki. In creating the book, their intention was to illustrate the complexity and interconnectivity of this ecosystem by focusing on one tree's role over time.

== Synopsis ==
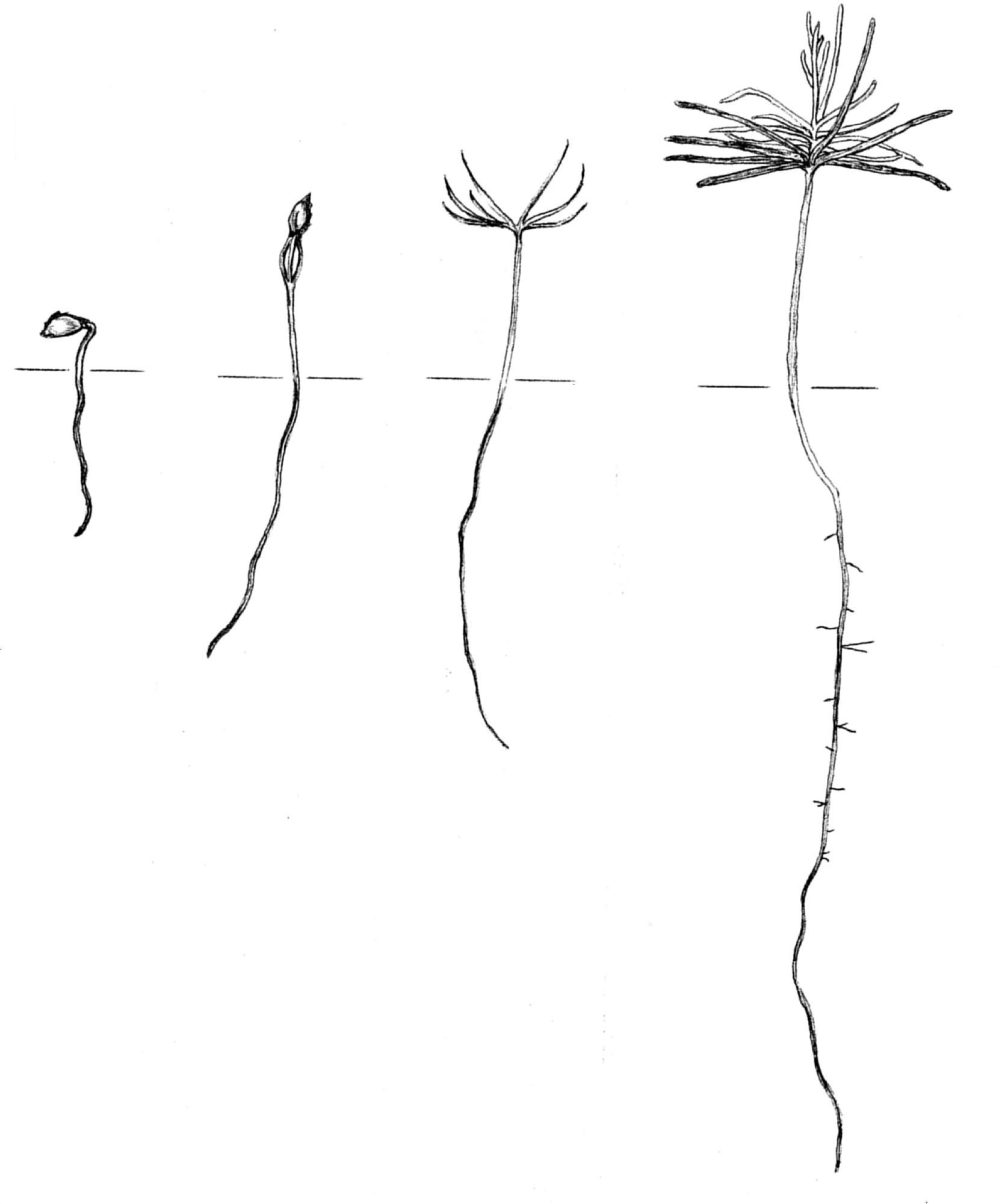
Douglas-fir seedling

The book consists of five chapters: "Birth", "Taking Root", "Growth", "Maturity", and "Death". The book opens with acknowledgments and an introduction, and closes with selected references and an index. In the introduction, Suzuki describes the tree at his home and the series of ideas and events that led to the writing of the book. Along with the narrative of the tree's life, the book includes digressions into related topics, such as the history of botany and animal life in the forest. The tree written about in the book is not any specific Douglas-fir, but rather a generic one.

The first chapter, "Birth", begins with lightning starting a forest fire. The heat dries the Douglas-fir cones enough for their scales to spread and release winged seeds. Rain water transports one seed to a sunlit area with well-drained soil. Rodents and insectivores, whose food stashes were destroyed in the fire, eat truffles, which survived underground, and leave feces containing nitrogen-fixing bacteria in the soil. Following one dormant winter stage, the seed begins to germinate.

In the second chapter, "Taking Root", the embryonic root emerges through a small opening in the seed coat and through cell division, aided by plant hormones, it grows downward. Water and nutrients enter the root by osmosis and are transported to the seedling. A symbiotic relationship develops between the roots and the truffles. The roots give its extra sugars to the truffles, which it uses for energy, and the truffles assist the roots' uptake of water and nutrients. From excess starches and nutrients gathered by the root, a stem similar to the root but surrounded with thin, grayish bark, grows upwards. As the starch reserves are exhausted, its first needles sprout and photosynthesis begins. The tree anchors itself with a deep taproot and a web of roots begin to grow laterally. Some roots develop symbiotic relationships with near-by red alders which excel at nitrogen-fixation but lack the storage capacity that the Douglas-fir can offer. In early April of every year, a new layer grows between the bark and wood. As this new layer takes over transportation of fluids throughout the tree, last year's layer of cells die and form a ring in the wood.

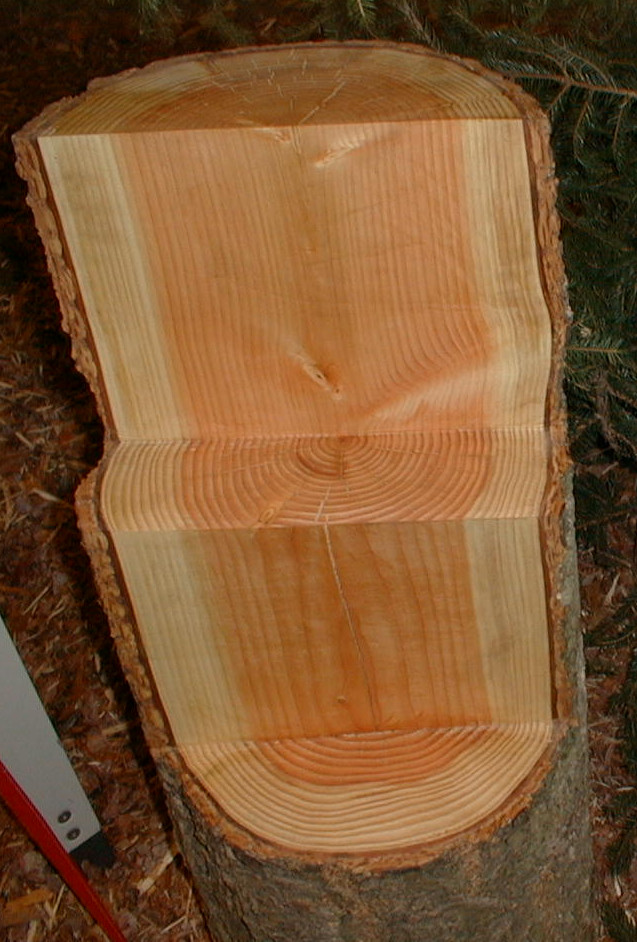
Cross-section of a Douglas-fir

After about 20 years, the tree begins to develop fertile cones. Buds form where auxins accumulate; these become either new needles or cones. The buds remain undifferentiated until July and continue to develop throughout the fall and winter. The next year, some buds will open in mid-May exposing a new set of needles. The cone buds on the lower end of the tree while other buds burst open in April releasing a mist of pollen. The cones at the top of the tree open their scales for wind-borne pollen to enter. Within the cone, the pollen fertilizes a seed which is released in September. The quantity and quality of seed production varies year-to-year but a particularly effective crop is produced about every 10 years. Less than 0.1% of seeds survive Douglas squirrels, dark-eyed juncos, and other seed-eating animals.

Over the centuries, the tree grows thicker and taller as successive rings develop around its trunk and new buds grow on the branches. The tree becomes part of an old growth forest with a shaded and damp understory of broadleaf trees, shrubs, and ferns. In the canopy, a mat of dead needles and lichen accumulate on the wide upper branches. Exposed to light, air, and rain, the needles decompose and the mat becomes colonized by insects, fungus, and new plants.

In the opening of the final chapter, "Death", the tree is 550 years old and stands 80 meters (260 feet) tall. Under the weight of too much snow accumulating on the canopy mat, a branch breaks off. Stresses from a long winter with a dry summer weaken the tree's immune system. The exposed area where the branch broke becomes infected with insects and fungus. Insect larvae eat the buds and the fungus spreads into the middle of the tree and down to the roots. With its vascular tissue system compromised, the tree diverts nutrients elsewhere, resulting in needles turning orange on the abandoned branches. Death takes years to occur as successive parts are slowly starved of nutrients. As a snag, it becomes home to a succession of animals, like woodpeckers, owls, squirrels, and bats. Eventually the roots rot enough that a rainstorm blows it down. Mosses and fungi grow on the deadfall, followed by colonies of termites, ants, and mites, which all help decompose the remaining wood.

== Genre and style ==
Tree is a popular science book, intended to profile the life of single tree using terminology targeted at a general audience. The narrative provides ecological context, describing animals and plants that interact with the tree, as well as historical context. Parallels to the tree's age are made with historical events, like the tree taking root as empirical science was taking root in Europe during the life of 13th century philosopher Roger Bacon. The book is most commonly described, and marketed, as a "biography". One reviewer grouped it with the 2005 book The Golden Spruce as part of a new genre: an "arbobiography".

The book is written in the third person, omniscient, style. Grady's writing moderates Suzuki's characteristic rhetoric to create writing that is accessible, with a tone described as "a breezy casualness that welcomes the reader". According to Suzuki, making the book accessible required telling the story from a human perspective, including some anthropomorphism of biological processes.

== Publication ==
The book was published by Greystone Books, an imprint of Douglas & McIntyre based in Vancouver that specializes in nature, travel, and sports topics. They published the hardcover version of Tree in September 2004. The book is small, measuring only 19×14 cm (7.6×5.4 inches) with 190 pages. Suzuki and Grady promoted it through media interviews and book signing events across Canada. In February 2005, Allen & Unwin published it in Australia as Tree: A Biography. The Recording for the Blind & Dyslexic released the audio book in April 2006. Greystone Books published the trade paperback in February 2007.

== Reception ==
In the Canadian market, the hardcover edition peaked at number three in the Maclean's and the National Post's non-fiction best seller lists. The magazine Science & Spirit published an excerpt in the January–February 2005 edition. It was nominated for the 2004 Canadian Science Writers' Association's Science in Society Journalism Award for 'General Audience Book', the 2005 B.C. Booksellers' Choice Award and the 2006 Council on Botanical and Horticultural Libraries' Annual Litereature Award for best 'General Interest' book. The French translation by Dominique Fortier was nominated for the 2006 Governor General's Awards for best English to French translation.

The premise of a biography for a tree was well received. The writing was called engaging, lyrical, and compelling. Robert Wiersema wrote, "Tree is science writing at its finest. It's sweeping but focused, keenly aware of both the minutiae and the big picture. ... Although some of the concepts are complex, the writing is always accessible ... Scientific matters are explained in layman's terms, and the text never bogs down or bottlenecks." However, some reviewers found the language too technical. In the Montreal Gazette, Bronwyn Chester wrote that the scientific language "dilut[es] our feeling and concern for this tree through too much information". Robert Bateman's black and white illustrations, while skilled, were said to add little to the narrative.
