= 28 Stories of AIDS in Africa =

Non-fiction book about AIDS epidemic in Africa

- Cover of the Knoft edition, cover photo by Yashido Fumoto
- Author: Stephanie Nolen
- Subject: HIV/AIDS in Africa
- Published: 1 May 2007
- Publisher: Walker & Company, Alfred A. Knopf Canada
- Publication place: Canada
- Pages: 384
- Awards: 2007 PEN “Courage” Award winner
- ISBN: 978-0802715982

28 Stories of AIDS in Africa is a 2007 non-fiction book by Canadian journalist and author Stephanie Nolen. It tells 28 stories of people who have worked tackling HIV/AIDS in healthcare, as advocates, and people who have been diagnosed as HIV positive and their family members.

The book has been met with widespread critical acclaim from academics, humanitarians, and book reviewers.

It was a national best selling book in Canada.

== Background ==
In 2003, Nolen, an award-winning Canadian journalist, persuaded her superiors at The Globe and Mail to let her investigate and report on the AIDS pandemic in Africa. She relocated to Johannesburg where she spent four years researching every aspect of the pandemic.

== Book summary ==
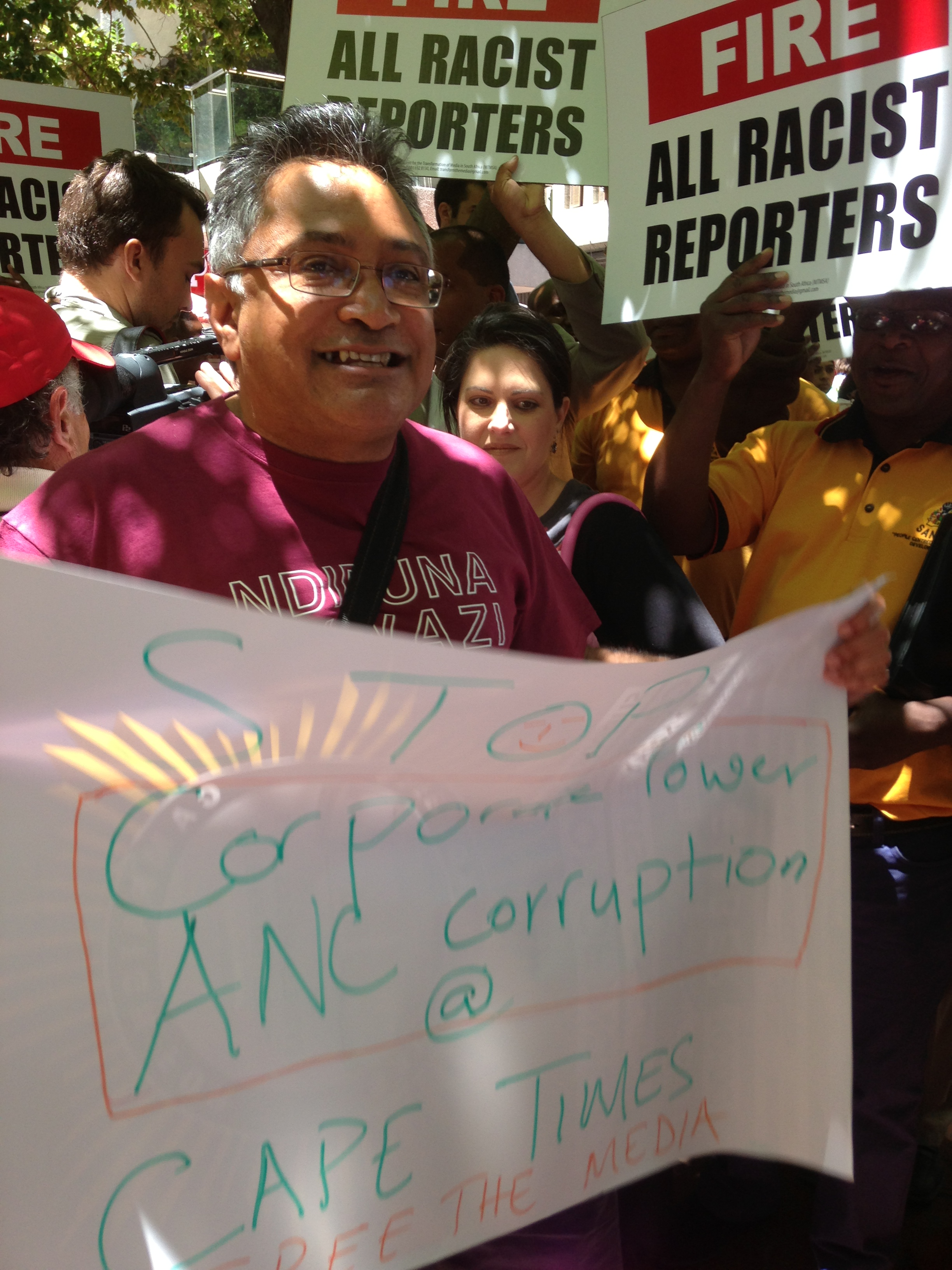
Zackie Achmat, in 2013

The book profiles 28 Africans who have HIV/AIDS, who have worked in healthcare or advocacy, or have otherwise been affected by the pandemic in sub-Saharan Africa, noting that 70% of global HIV cases are in sub-Saharan Africa.

The book opens with background material about the work of Nolen, an explanation of HIV/AIDS in lay terms, and notes that 28 stories have been chosen because 28 million people had been infected with HIV/AIDS.

Each of the 28 stories opens with a photograph of the person that is the subject of the chapter.

- Chapter 1 Siphiwe Hlophe who cares for orphans in Swaziland.
- Chapter 2 Tigist Haile Michael, an Ethiopian school girl orphaned by AIDS
- Chapter 3 Mohammed Ali a Kenyan truck driver
- Chapter 4 Prisca Mhlolo from Zimbabwe who was assaulted by her own family when she told them her positive HIV status
- Chapter 5 Regine Mamba, a grandmother
- Chapter 6 Lydia Mungherera, a Ugandan doctor
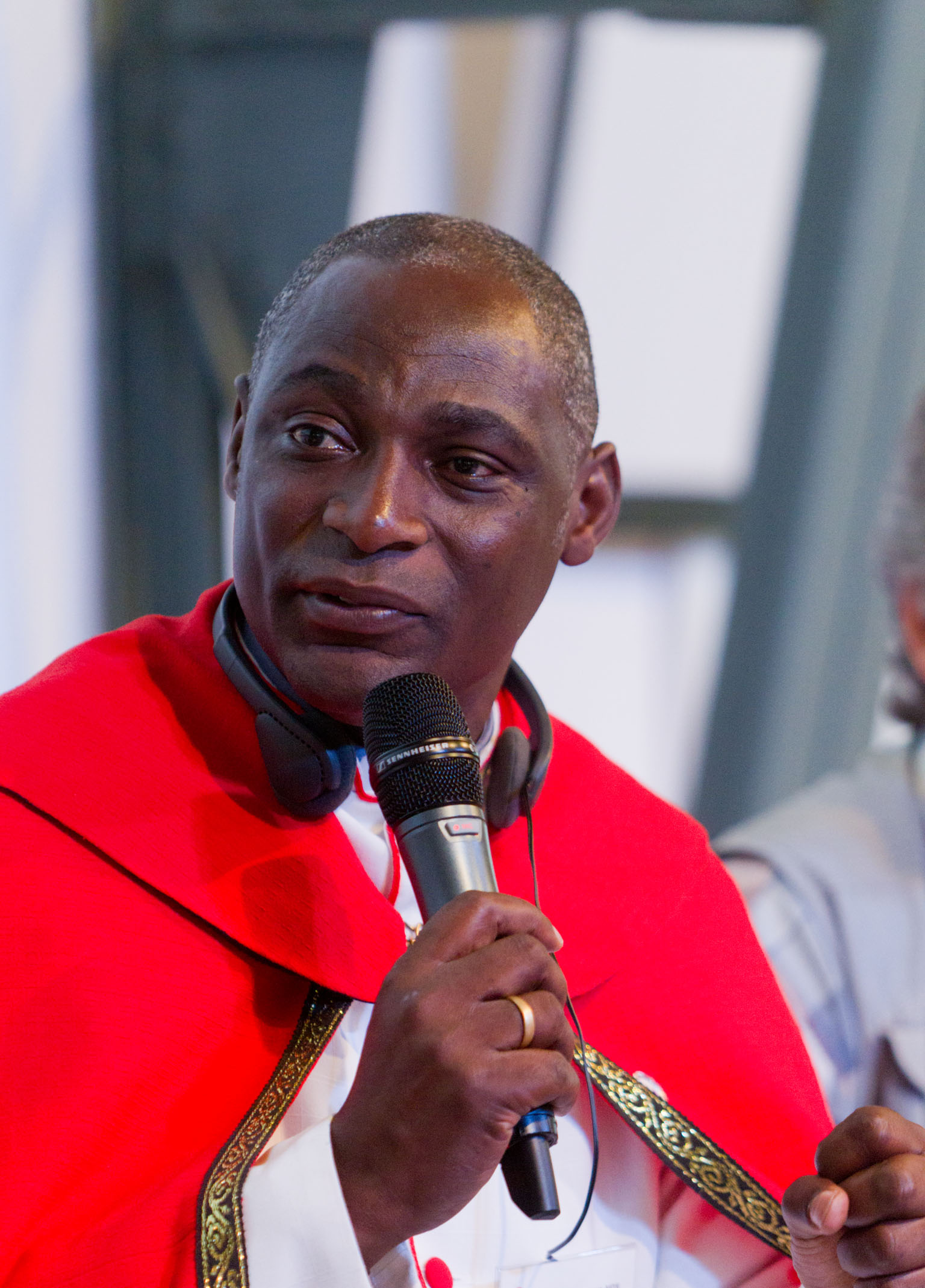
  Gideon Byamugisha, in 2012
- Chapter 7 Noé Sebisaba, a blood donor who was surprised to find himself with an HIV diagnosis
- Chapter 8 Christine Amisi a Médecins Sans Frontières nurse
- Chapter 9 Manuel Cossa, a migrant gold miner from Mozambique who worked in South Africa
- Chapter 10 Cynthia Leshomo of Botswana who worked to reduce stigma
- Chapter 11 Mfanimpela Thlabatse a farmer in Swaziland who lost his wife and children to HIV/AIDS just months before the treatments became available to his community
- Chapter 12 Andualem Ayalew an Ethiopian soldier who lost his job and who was denied the opportunity to study abroad because of his HIV status
- Chapter 13 Alice Kadzanja, a nurse in Zomba
- Chapter 14 Zackie Achmat the famous South African HIV activist
- Chapter 15 Lefa Khoele from Lesotho who struggled with HIV until he was given medication at age 12
- Chapter 16 Pontiano Kaleebu a Ugandan doctor working on an HIV/AIDS vaccine
- Chapter 17 Winstone Zulu the AIDS activist
- Chapter 18 Agnes Munyiva a Kenyan sex workers who avoided AIDS despite over 2,000 sexual encounters
- Chapter 19 Mpho Segomela a South African child who died of AIDS
- Chapter 20 Anne Mumbi, a sex worker who avoided AIDS despite the odds
- Chapter 21 Gideon Byamugisha the Ugandan priest who speaks about the good things he has done, and his failings
- Chapter 22 Ida Mukuka an AIDS counselor from Lusaka
- Chapter 23 Anita Manhiça a Mozambique housewife who was infected by her husband, but who was accused of infecting him
- Chapter 24 Morolake Odetoyinbo who is struggling to live with the virus in Nigeria
- Chapter 25 Moleen Mudimu who stopped being able to afford the medicine that help keep her alive once the Zimbabwean economy collapsed
- Chapter 26 Ibrahim Umoru a Nigerian activist
- Chapter 27 Nelson Mandela whose son died of AIDS
- Chapter 28 Thokozani Mthiyane a South African who manages his HIV thanks to USAID subsidized medications

The book ends with a chapter about how readers can help.

== Critical reception ==
Stephen Lewis described the book as "the best book ever written about AIDS, certainly the best I've ever read".

The Guardian praised the book for focusing on the stories of people in Africa, rather than USA, and also credited Nolen for linking the stories to culture, society and politics.

The Canadian Broadcasting Corporation described the book as "timely, transformative, thoroughly accessible" and described how Nolen writes with "power, understanding and simplicity."

Bono called the book a "formidable book of record."

Laretta Benjamin, an AIDS researcher, described the book as one of the best she has read, complimented Nolan for putting a human face on the statistics.

The New Times of Rwanda described the book as probably the best written account of the history of HIV/AIDS.

James Orbinski said of the book "Read. Weep. Rage. And above all else - like those people described in this book - find the courage to do."

== Awards ==
- 2007 PEN Canada Paul Kidd Courage Prize (awarded to Nolen for her coverage of the AIDS crisis in Africa)
- 2007 Governor General's Award for English-language non-fiction, shortlisted

== Editions ==
The book has been published in seven languages in eleven countries, including:

- Hardcover, Random House, 2007, ISBN 978-0-8027-1598-2.
- Hardcover, Knopf Canada, 2007, ISBN 978-0-676-97822-3.
