= Philip Resnick =

Canadian political scientist

Academic background
- Education: University of Toronto (PhD), McGill University (BA, MA)

Academic work
- Discipline: political science
- Institutions: University of British Columbia
- Main interests: Canadian politics

Philip Resnick is a Canadian political scientist and poet who is Professor Emeritus at the University of British Columbia. He is known for his works on Canadian politics.

== Books ==
- Letters to a Québécois Friend
- The Masks of Proteus: Canadian Reflections on the State
- Toward a Canada-Quebec Union
- Thinking English Canada
- Twenty-First Century Democracy
- The Politics of Resentment: B.C. Regionalism and Canadian Unity
- The European Roots of Canadian Identity
- The Labyrinth of North American Identities
- Itineraries: An Intellectual Odyssey
- Footsteps of the Past
- Passageways
