= Winstone Zulu =

HIV and tuberculosis activist

- Born: January 7, 1964; Lusaka, Zambia
- Died: October 12, 2011 (aged 47); Lusaka, Zambia
- Known for: HIV/AIDS and tuberculosis activism

Winstone Zulu (January 7, 1964 – October 12, 2011) was a Zambian HIV and tuberculosis activist. Zulu, who became the first Zambian to publicly acknowledge his HIV status in 1990, was considered one of the world's leading HIV and AIDS activists. At the time, people diagnosed with HIV/AIDS faced widespread discrimination in Zambia.

== Biography ==
Zulu was born in Lusaka, Zambia, in 1964, and was the sixth of his parents' thirteen children.

In 1990, Zulu made headlines by becoming the first person to announce his HIV status in the country. He became one of the first Africans to become involved in the AIDS crisis on a worldwide level.

Zulu was further diagnosed with tuberculosis in 1997. He lost four of his brothers to tuberculosis during his lifetime due to little access to anti-TB drugs, widely available in other countries. The deaths of his brothers and his own diagnosis led Zulu to focus his advocacy on behalf of tuberculosis patients and efforts to curb the disease. He explained in the late 1990s, "TB treatment gives patients more time. If my brothers had survived TB they might have lived long enough to access HIV drugs like me. They shouldn’t have died."

Zulu noted the link between HIV/AIDS status of patients and a diagnosis with tuberculosis. From 1997 to 2011, Zulu called for increased financial investments to fight the spread of tuberculosis, as well as TB cases directly related to HIV and AIDS. Former South African President Nelson Mandela spoke of Zulu saying, "There have been so few TB survivors who have stepped forward to share their stories. We need more advocates like Winstone to tell the world about TB and the effect it has on so many millions of people."

Zulu was taken to University Teaching Hospital (UTH) in Lusaka on October 11, 2011. He died from complications of AIDS at the hospital during the early morning hours of October 12, 2011.

In 2011 during the World AIDS day celebration on December 1 a statue of Winstone Zulu was unveiled by his widow. The statue of Anti Retroviral Man in front of the Lusaka National Museum is made out of old hospice beds on which thousands of people have died of AIDS. The statue is modelled after Winstone Zulu by art4art (Art for Anti Retroviral Treatment), a Zambian NGO.
