= Lori Saint-Martin =

Canadian author and translator (c. 1959 – 2022)

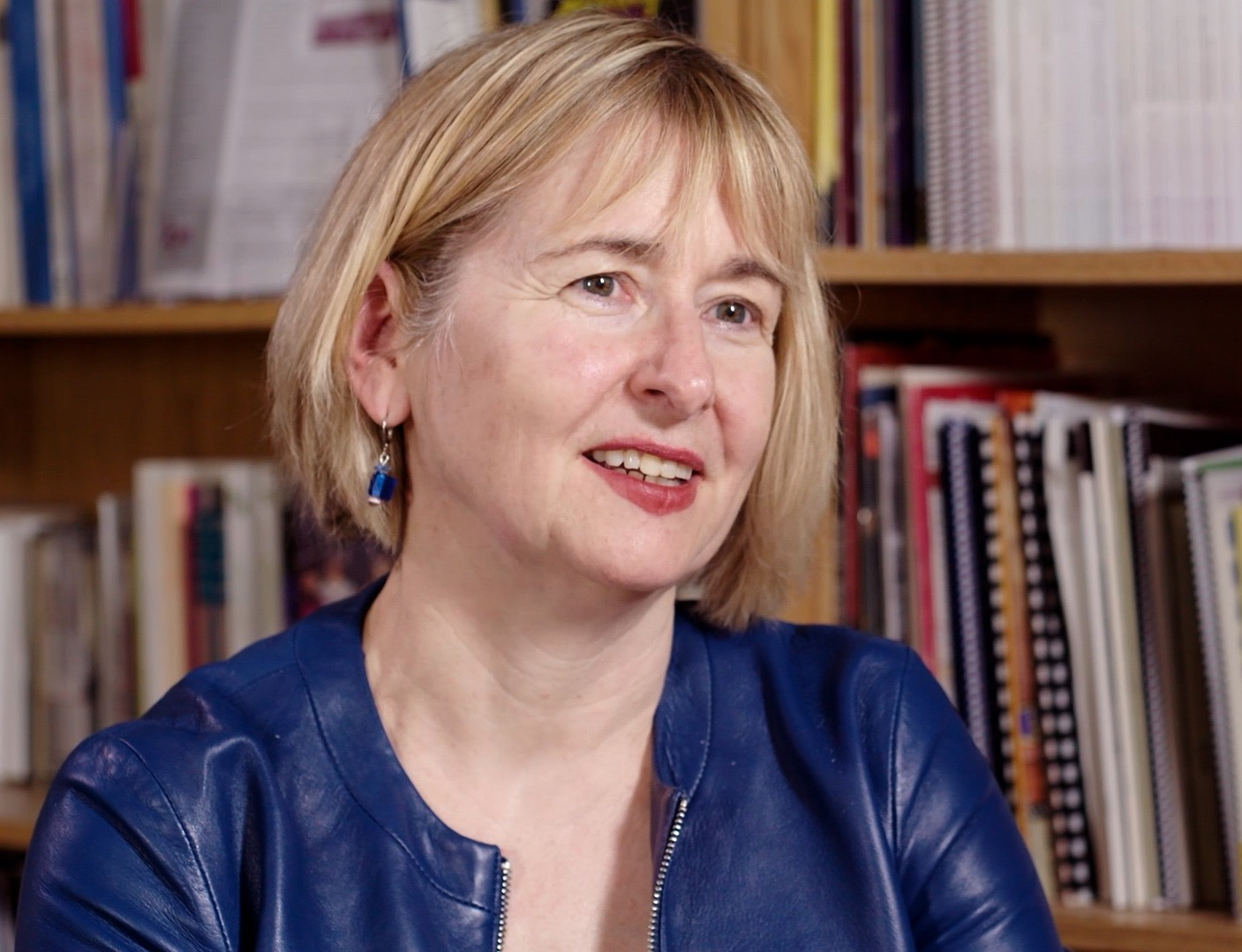
- Born: 20 November 1959; Kitchener, Ontario, Canada
- Died: 22 October 2022 (aged 62); Paris, France
- Occupations: Author, literary translator
- Spouse: Paul Gagné
- Awards: Acfas Andre-Laurendeau Award (2013); Governor General's Literary Awards (2000); Governor General's Award for English to French translation (2018)

Lori Saint-Martin (c. 1959 – 22 October 2022) was a Canadian author and literary translator. Her first novel, Les Portes closes, came out in 2013. Working with her husband Paul Gagné, she translated over seventy English language books into French, including the works of such authors as Maya Angelou, Margaret Atwood, and Naomi Klein.

Saint-Martin died on 22 October 2022, at the age of 62.

== Education ==
Saint-Martin attended the University of Waterloo for her undergraduate education where she graduated with her Bachelor of Arts in 1980 and received the Alumni Gold Medal. She graduated from Université Laval with her doctorate in 1988 on Québecois women's literature, entitled Malaise et révolte des femmes dans la littérature québécoise depuis 1945.

== Works ==
Saint-Martin taught literature at the Université du Québec à Montréal (UQÀM). As a specialist of women's studies and Quebec literature, she published several scholarly works on these subjects. As an author, she has published three short story collections and a novel.

Fiction:

- 2014 – Mathématiques intimes (short stories)
- 2013 – Les Portes closes (novel)
- 1999 – Mon père, la nuit (short stories)
- 1991 – Lettre imaginaire à la femme de mon amant (short stories)

Non-fiction:

- 2011 – Postures viriles : ce que dit la presse masculine (Éditions du remue-ménage)
- 2010 – Au-delà du nom : la question du père dans la littérature québécoise actuelle (Presses de l'Université de Montréal)
- 2002 – La voyageuse et la prisonnière : Gabrielle Roy et la question des femmes (Boréal)
- 1999 – Le nom de la mere : meres, filles et ecriture dans la litterature Quebecoise au feminin (Édition Nota bene)
- 1997 – Contre-voix : essais de critique au féminin (Nuit blanche)
- 1992–1994 – L'autre lecture : La critique au féminin et les textes québécois (XYZ)

Selected translations (with Paul Gagné):

- 2008 – Tant que je serai noire (Maya Angelou, The Heart of a Woman)
- 2008 – La Stratégie du choc (Naomi Klein, The Shock Doctrine)
- 2008 – 28 (Stephanie Nolen, 28)
- 2006 – Contre-la-montre : combattre le sida en Afrique (Stephen Lewis, Race Against Time: Searching for Hope in AIDS-Ravaged Africa)
- 2006 – Cibles mouvantes : essais 1971–2004 (Margaret Atwood, Moving Targets: Writing with Intent, 1982–2004)
- 2005 – L'Odyssée de Pénéloppe (Margaret Atwood, The Penelopiad)
- 2001 – La Perte et le fracas (Alistair MacLeod, No Great Mischief)

== Awards and recognition ==
Lori Saint-Martin and Paul Gagné have been jointly awarded several translation prizes throughout their career. These include the John Glassco Translation Prize in 1993, the QWF Translation Prize in 2004, 2006 and 2008 and the Governor General's Literary Award in 2000, 2007 and 2015. They have also been shortlisted for the Governor General's Literary Award an additional twelve times.
