= Wayne Grady (author) =

Canadian writer, editor, and translator (born 1948)

- Born: 1948 (age 77–78); Windsor, Ontario
- Occupations: translator, science writer, novelist
- Spouse: Merilyn Simonds
- Writing career
- Period: 1990s-present
- Notable works: Emancipation Day, Tree: A Life Story

Wayne Grady (born 1948 in Windsor, Ontario) is a Canadian writer, editor, and translator. He is the author of fourteen books of nonfiction, the translator of more than a dozen novels from the French, and the editor of many literary anthologies of fiction and nonfiction. He currently teaches creative writing in the MFA program at the University of British Columbia.

As a translator, Grady has won the 1989 Governor General's Award for French to English translation for On the Eighth Day, his translation of Antonine Maillet's novel Le Huitième jour, and the John Glassco Translation Prize for Christopher Cartier of Hazelnut, his translation of Maillet's Christophe Cartier de la Noisette dit Nounours. As a writer, he won the 2008 National Outdoor Book Award (Nature and the Environment category) for The Great Lakes: The Natural History of a Changing Region.

His book Bringing Back the Dodo (2006) is a collection of intuitive and humbling essays on our history with the natural world, extinction, and our effects on the planet.

His first novel, Emancipation Day, deals with the marriage, during the Second World War, of a black man who is passing for white, and a white woman who knows nothing of her husband's past; the novel was inspired by Grady's discovery, while doing genealogical research, that his own great-grandfather was an African American emigrant from the United States. Emancipation Day was named a longlisted nominee for the 2013 Scotiabank Giller Prize. October 1970, his English translation of Louis Hamelin's 2010 novel La Constellation du Lynx, was also a longlisted nominee for the Giller in the same year. On April 29, 2014, Emancipation Day was named the winner of the 2013 Amazon.ca First Novel Award.

Grady is married to writer Merilyn Simonds.

== Works ==
- The Dinosaur Project: The Story of the Greatest Dinosaur Expedition Ever Mounted (1993)
- Toronto the Wild: Field Notes of an Urban Naturalist (1995)
- Vulture: Nature's Ghastly Gourmet (1997)
- The Quiet Limit of the World: A Journey to the North Pole to Investigate Global Warming (1997)
- Chasing the Chinook: On the Trail of Canadian Words and Culture (1998)
- Tree: A Life Story (2004, co-authored with David Suzuki)
- Bringing Back the Dodo (2006)
- The Great Lakes: A Natural History of a Changing Region (2007)
- Breakfast at the Exit Cafe: A Journey Through America (2010, co-authored with Merilyn Simonds)
- Emancipation Day (2013)
