= Stephanie Nolen =

Canadian journalist and writer (born 1971)

- Born: September 3, 1971 (age 55); Montreal, Quebec, Canada
- Education: University of King's College; London School of Economics
- Occupation: Journalist
- Employer: The New York Times

Stephanie Nolen OC (born September 3, 1971, in Montreal, Quebec) is a Canadian journalist and writer. She is currently the Global Health Reporter for The New York Times. From 2013 to 2019, she was the Latin America bureau chief for The Globe and Mail. From 2008 to 2013, she was the Globe's South Asia Bureau Chief, based in New Delhi. From 2003 to 2008, she was the Globe's Africa bureau chief, and she has reported from more than 60 countries around the world. She is a seven-time National Newspaper Awards winner for her work in Africa and India. She is tied for the most NNA wins in the history of the awards. Nolen is a four-time recipient of the Amnesty International Award for Human Rights Reporting. Her book on Africa's AIDS pandemic, 28: Stories of AIDS in Africa, was nominated for the 2007 Governor General's Literary Award and has been published in 15 countries. She is the co-founder of the Museum of AIDS in Africa.

== Early life and education ==
Nolen was raised in Montreal and Ottawa. She earned a degree in journalism from the University of King's College in Halifax, Nova Scotia, then earned a master's degree in economic development from the London School of Economics. She speaks French, Portuguese, Arabic and Spanish.

== Journalism career ==
Nolen was a freelance journalist based in Jerusalem from 1994–97 and an investigative reporter at Maclean's from 1997–98. She has been a freelance contributor to Newsweek, The Independent, Ms. and other publications.

Her career at The Globe and Mail began in 1993. She was an Arts and Focus Reporter from 1998–2000 and a National Reporter from 2000–2003. She served as its correspondent covering the United States invasion of Afghanistan, the fall of the Taliban and the 2003 invasion of Iraq.

In 2003, Nolen became the Globe's Africa Bureau Chief (2003–08). Her dispatches concerned the consequences of war and political instability in a variety of places within Africa, particularly Rwanda, the Democratic Republic of the Congo, Sudan, Zimbabwe and Uganda (specifically the Lord's Resistance Army). The most recurring theme in her coverage was the health, social and political consequences of the AIDS epidemic in Africa.

In five years as South Asia Bureau Chief at the Globe, Nolen reported on the Sri Lankan civil war, the Pakistani government's struggle with islamic militants and war crimes in Bangladesh, but is best known for her work on gender and caste issues in India. Her "Prerna Project", on a school for Dalit girls in Bihar, won accolades including a National Newspaper Award, an Online News Award and an honorable mention for a Webby Award.

== Awards ==
Atkinson Foundation

- 2020 - Atkinson Fellowship in Public Policy awarded at the Canadian Journalism Foundation's virtual awards show June 11, 2020

National Newspaper Awards

- 2012 – Arts and Entertainment, for a story of a Canadian adult entertainment star's success in Bollywood.
- 2011 – International Reporting for a series of stories, videos and interactive maps, profiling girls at the bottom of India's caste system attending a groundbreaking school.
- 2011 – Arts and Entertainment, Nolen gained access to the secretive set of Midnight's Children in Sri Lanka, where director Deepa Mehta – whose films have outraged Hindu fundamentalists in India – adapted the most celebrated work of Salman Rushdie.
- 2009 – Explanatory Work, for a piece on the paradox of newly prosperous India's malnourished children.
- 2007 – Explanatory Work, for her story on how inexpensive vaccinations, mosquito nets and vitamins are saving the lives of children in the developing world.
- 2004 – International Reporting, for her story about Rwanda 10 years after the country was ripped apart by genocidal warfare.
- 2003 – International Reporting, profile of Stephen Lewis and his dogged campaign to help Africa with its AIDS crisis.

Amnesty International Media Award, National Print category

- 2018 "Colombia's new season of fear" illustrating the turmoil in Colombia as groups battle to fill the power vacuum created by the peace deal, and the deadly implications for the country’s most vulnerable communities, The Globe and Mail, June 18, 2018.
- 2015 "'If I send him, he may die. But if I keep him here, he will die'" an account of a mother's repeated efforts to help her teenage boy escape El Salvador's gang violence, The Globe and Mail, August 29, 2015.
- 2011 "From purdah to power – by many tiny steps" The Globe and Mail, March 22, 2011.
- 2006 "From the bush, a harsh homecoming" about the children's war in northern Uganda, The Globe and Mail, July 8, 2006.
- 2004 “The Next Rwanda? Sudan’s Neglected Nightmare” The Globe and Mail, June 5, 2004.
- 2003 "Uganda's Child Soldiers" The Globe and Mail, January 25, 2003.

National Magazine Awards

- 2014 "High and Dry", Gold in business category. Published in the May 2015 RoB Magazine.
- 2011 "Where Asbestos is Just a Fact of Life,” written by John Gray and Stephanie Nolen with photographs by Louie Palu. Gold in the business category. Published in the December 2011 RoB Magazine. It was the most highly recognized single article of the NMAs, nominated for a record five awards. It also took silver in politics and public interest and honourable mentions in investigative reporting, health and medicine and science, technology and the environment.

PEN Canada Paul Kidd Courage Prize

- 2007 – For her coverage of the AIDS crisis in Africa.

Honorary degrees

- University of King's College
- University of Guelph
- University of Victoria

== Personal life ==
Nolen in November 2020 was living in Halifax, Canada.

In 2026, she was named as an Officer of the Order of Canada. She lives in Halifax, Nova Scotia.

== Publications ==
- "The Road." The Globe and Mail, January 26, 2018, Highway of riches, road to ruin: Inside the Amazon's deforestation crisis
- "Brazil's Colour Bind," The Globe and Mail, July 31, 2015, Brazil’s colour bind: How one of the world's most diverse countries is just starting to talk about race
- "Breaking Caste." The Globe and Mail, December 2, 2011, Stephanie Nolen: The goal is to see how far a Mushahar girls can go, armed with dreams and hope
- Shakespeare's Face: Unraveling the Legend and History of Shakespeare's Mysterious Portrait, 2002. ISBN 978-0-307-36651-1.
- Promised the Moon: The Untold Story of the First Women in the Space Race, 2004, Thunder's Mouth Press, ISBN 978-1-56858-319-8.
- 28 Stories of AIDS in Africa:
  - Edition by Random House, 2007, ISBN 978-0-8027-1598-2.
  - Edition by Knopf Canada, 2007, ISBN 978-0-676-97822-3.
- Out of India, Globe and Mail Ebooks, August 2013
