= Governor General's Award for French-language young people's literature - illustrated books =

Canadian literary award

The Governor General's Award for French-language young people's literature - illustrated books is a Canadian literary award presented annually to a Canadian writer and illustrator, or an individual serving as both, for an illustrated book in French. It is one of four awards recognizing English- and French-language writing and illustration in young people's literature. The Governor General's Awards program is administered by the Canada Council.

In name, this award is part of the Governor General's Award program only from 1987 but the four children's literature awards were established in 1975 under a Canada Council name. In the event, the "Canada Council" and "Governor General's" awards have recognized children's book illustration in a French-language children's book every year from 1977. The category was known as "Children's Literature - Illustration" until 2015. In 2016, it became part of the Young People's Literature categories, under the name "Young People's Literature - Illustrated Books".

== Canada Council Children's Literature Prize ==
In 1975 the Canada Council established four annual prizes of $5000 for the year's best English- and French-language children's books by Canadian writers and illustrators. Those "Canada Council Children's Literature Prizes" were continued under the "Governor General's Awards" rubric from 1987, and continue today. Among them the French-language illustration prize was awarded every year from 1977.

- 1977: Claude Lafortune, L'évangile en papier, written by Henriette Major
- 1978: Ginette Anfousse, La varicelle
- 1979: Roger Paré, Une fenêtre dans ma tête, by Raymond Plante
- 1980: Miyuki Tanobi, Les gens de mon pays, by Gilles Vigneault
- 1981: Joanne Ouellet, Les Papinacois, by Michel Noël
- 1982: Darcia Labrosse, Agnès et le singulier bestiare, by Marie José Thériault
- 1983: Philippe Béha, Petit ours (Grand-maman, Où est ma tétine?, Mon bébé-soeur, Quand ça va mal), by Sylvie Assathiany and Louise Pelletier
- 1984: Marie-Louise Gay, Drôle d'école (Rond comme ton visage, Blanc comme neige, Petit et grand, Un Léopard dans mon placard)
- 1985: Roger Paré, L'alphabet
- 1986: Stéphane Poulin, Album de famille and As-tu vu Joséphine?

== 1980s ==
Year	Nominee	Title
1987	Darcia Labrosse	Venir au monde
1987	Hélène Desputeaux	Bonne fête Madeleine
1987	Stéphane Poulin	Les animaux en hiver
1987	Gilles Tibo	Annabel Lee
1988	Philippe Béha	Les Jeux de Pic-Mots
1988	Sylvie Daigle	Le Mot de passe
1988	Pierre Pratt	Peut-il, peut-elle?
1988	Gilles Tibo	Simon et les flocons de neige
1989	Stéphane Poulin	Benjamin et la saga des oreillers
1989	Frédéric Back	L'Homme qui plantait des arbres
1989	Philippe Béha	Mais que font les fées avec toutes ces dents?

== 1990s ==
Year	Author	Title
1990	Pierre Pratt	Les Fantaisies de l'oncle Henri
1990	Mireille Levert	Jérémie et Mme Ming
1990	Stéphane Poulin	Les Amours de ma mère
1991	Sheldon Cohen	Un champion
1991	Stéphane Poulin	Un voyage pour deux : contes et mensonges de mon enfance
1992	Gilles Tibo	Simon et la ville de carton
1992	Honey Fox	Le bébé de Lulu
1992	Pierre Pratt	Léon sans son chapeau
1992	Daniel Sylvestre	Mais qui va trouver le trésor?
1993	Stéphane Jorisch	Le Monde selon Jean de ...
1993	Francis Back	Des crayons qui trichent
1993	Michel Bisson	Thomas et la nuit
1993	Sheldon Cohen	Le Plus Long Circuit
1993	François Vaillancourt	Le Premier Voyage de Monsieur Patapoum
1994	Pierre Pratt	Mon chien est un éléphant
1994	Sylvie Deronzier	Tartarin et le lion
1994	Stéphane Poulin	Le parc aux sortilèges
1994	Rémy Simard	Monsieur noir et blanc
1994	Gilles Tibo	Simon et la plume perdue
1995	Annouchka Gravel Galouchko	Sho et les dragons d'eau
1995	Marie-Louise Gay	Berthold et Lucrèce
1995	Stéphane Jorisch	Le Baiser maléfique
1995	Pierre Pratt	La Bottine magique de Pipo
1995	Rémy Simard	Le père Noël a une crevaison
1996	No award presented	
1997	Stéphane Poulin	Poil de serpent, dent d'araignée
1997	Leanne Franson	L'Ourson qui voulait une Juliette
1997	Stéphane Jorisch	Casse-Noisette
1997	Gilles Tibo	Simon et le petit cirque
1998	Pierre Pratt	Monsieur Ilétaitunefois
1998	Stéphane Poulin	Petit zizi
1998	Alain Reno	Un tartare pour le bonhomme Sept Heures
1998	Yayo	Le Chasseur d'arc-en-ciel
1999	Stéphane Jorisch	Charlotte et l'île du destin
1999	Nicole Lafond	Contes pour enfants
1999	Michèle Lemieux	Nuit d'orage
1999	Luc Melanson	La Petite Kim
1999	Pierre Pratt	La Vie exemplaire de Martha et Paul

== 2000s ==
Year	Author	Title
2000	Anne Villeneuve	L'Écharpe rouge
2000	Marie-Louise Gay	Sur mon île
2000	Pascale Constantin	Gloups!, Bébé-vampire
2000	Geneviève Côté	La grande aventure d'un petit mouton noir
2000	Gérard DuBois	Riquet à la Houppe
2001	Bruce Roberts	Fidèles éléphants
2001	Marjolaine Bonenfant	L'abécédaire des animots
2001	Pascale Constantin	Alexis, chevalier des nuits
2001	Stéphane Poulin	Vieux Thomas et la petite fée
2001	Mylène Pratt	Le dimanche de Madame B
2002	Luc Melanson	Le grand voyage de Monsieur
2002	Philippe Béha	La reine rouge
2002	Jean-Marie Benoit	Le voyage à l'envers
2002	Guy England	L'ami perdu
2002	Mylène Pratt	Décroche-moi la lune
2003	Virginie Egger	Recette d’éléphant à la sauce vieux pneu
2003	Geneviève Côté	Le Premier Printemps du monde
2003	Gérard DuBois	Le piano muet
2003	Stéphane Jorisch	Thésée et le Minotaure
2003	Stéphane Poulin	Annabel et la Bête
2004	Janice Nadeau	Nul poisson où aller
2004	Francine Bouchard (Fanny)	Le grand rêve de Passepoil
2004	Pascale Constantin	Turlututu, rien ne va plus!
2004	Samuel Parent (Sampar)	Savais-tu? Les Hyènes
2004	Alain Reno	Comment l’ours blanc perdit sa queue
2005	Isabelle Arsenault	Le cœur de monsieur Gauguin
2005	Pascale Constantin	La vie comptée de Raoul Lecompte
2005	Luc Melanson	Les compositeurs
2005	Stéphane Poulin	Un chant de Noël
2005	Pierre Pratt	Le jour où Zoé zozota
2006	Rogé	Le gros monstre qui aimait trop lire
2006	Steve Adams	Le trésor de Jacob
2006	Marie Lafrance	Le petit chien de laine
2006	Lino	Les cendres de maman
2006	Frédéric Normandin	Je suis fou de Vava
2007	Geneviève Côté	La petite rapporteuse de mots
2007	Stéphane-Yves Barroux	Superbricoleur: Le roi de la clef à molette
2007	Manon Gauthier	Ma maman du photomaton
2007	Caroline Merola	Une nuit en ville
2007	Daniel Sylvestre	Ma vie de reptile
2008	Janice Nadeau	Ma meilleure amie
2008	Philippe Béha	Les pays inventés
2008	Stéphane Jorisch	Un cadeau pour Sophie
2008	Marie Lafrance	Le sorcier amoureux
2008	Caroline Merola	Quand le chat est parti
2009	Janice Nadeau	Harvey
2009	Philippe Béha	Ulysse et Pénélope
2009	Gérard DuBois	Henri au jardin d'enfants
2009	Pierre Pratt	L'étoile de Sarajevo
2009	Rogé	La vraie histoire de Léo Pointu

== 2010s ==
Year	Nominee	Title
2010	Daniel Sylvestre	Rose : derrière le rideau de la folie
2010	Josée Bisaillon	Le funambule
2010	Virginie Egger	Mon premier amour
2010	Manon Gauthier	Triste sort
2010	Melinda Josie	Le géranium
2011	Caroline Merola	Lili et les poilus
2011	Sophie Casson	Quelle pagaille!
2011	Shea Chang	Tarentelle
2011	Élisabeth Eudes-Pascal	Bill Chocottes, le héros qui avait peur
2011	Rogé	Haïti, mon pays
2012	Élise Gravel	La clé à molette
2012	Marion Arbona	Lapin-Chagrin et les jours d'Elko
2012	Manon Gauthier	Giroflée Pois-Cassé
2012	Émilie Leduc	La ronde des mois
2012	Katty Maurey	Quand j'étais chien
2013	Isabelle Arsenault	Jane, le renard et moi
2013	Jacinthe Chevalier	Aujourd'hui, le ciel
2013	Marianne Dubuc	Au carnaval des animaux
2013	Stéphane Jorisch	Quand je serai grand
2013	Rogé	Mingan, mon village
2014	Marianne Dubuc	Le lion et l’oiseau
2014	Pascal Blanchet	Le Noël de Marguerite
2014	Manon Gauthier	Grand-mère, elle et moi…
2014	Isabelle Malenfant	Pablo trouve un trésor
2014	Pierre Pratt	Gustave
2015	André Marois, Patrick Doyon	Le voleur de sandwichs
2015	Jacques Goldstyn	L'arbragan
2015	Mireille Levert	Quand j'écris avec mon cœur
2015	Mélanie Perreault, Marion Arbona	Rosalie entre chien et chat
2015	Renée Robitaille, Philippe Béha	Douze oiseaux
2016	Stéphanie Lapointe, Rogé	Grand-père et la lune
2016	Jules Asselin, Ninon Pelletier	Le mystère des billes d'or
2016	Simon Boulerice, Delphie Côté-Lacroix	Florence et Léon
2016	Andrée Poulin, Marie Lafrance	Deux garçons et un secret
2016	Yayo	Pikiq
2017	Jacques Goldstyn	Azadah
2017	Pascal Blanchet	En voiture! L'Amérique en chemin de fer
2017	Fanny Britt, Isabelle Arsenault	Louis parmi les spectres
2017	Christiane Duchesne, Marion Arbona	Fred Petitchatminou
2017	Renée Robitaille, Slavka Kolesar	La légende de Carcajou
2018	Marianne Dubuc	Le chemin de la montagne
2018	Marianne Ferrer, India Desjardins	Une histoire de cancer qui finit bien
2018	Gabriella Gendreau, Nahid Kazemi	Les mots d'Eunice
2018	Jacques Goldstyn	Jules et Jim : frères d’armes
2018	Nicole Testa, Annie Boulanger	Lili Macaroni : je suis comme je suis!
2019	Stéphanie Lapointe, Delphie Côté-Lacroix	Jack et le temps perdu
2019	Simon Boulerice, Josée Bisaillon	Le pelleteur de nuages
2019	Stéphanie Deslauriers, Geneviève Després	Laurent, c'est moi!
2019	Mélanie Leclerc	Contacts
2019	Lucie Papineau, Lucie Crovatto	L'escapade de Paolo

== 2020s ==
Year	Author	Title	Ref
2020	Katia Canciani, Guillaume Perreault	Pet et Répète: la véritable histoire	
2020	Cathon	Mimose & Sam : Mission hibernation	
2020	Valérie Fontaine, Nathalie Dion	Le grand méchant loup dans ma maison	
2020	Mireille Levert	Le pays aux mille soleils	
2020	Kim Nunès, Marie-Chantal Perron, Tammy Verge, Amélie Dubois	copine et Copine	
2021	Mario Brassard, Gérard DuBois	À qui appartiennent les nuages ?	
2021	Jacques Goldstyn	Le Tricot	
2021	François Gravel, Laurent Pinabel	La langue au chat et autres poèmes pas bêtes	
2021	Catherine Lepage	Bouées : dérives identitaires, amours imaginaires et détours capillaires	
2021	Vigg	Ma maison-tête	
2022	Nadine Robert, Qin Leng	Trèfle	
2022	Fanny Britt, Isabelle Arsenault	Truffe	
2022	Pierrette Dubé and Enzo	Un rhume de cheval	
2022	Orbie	La fin des poux?	
2022	Paul Tom, Mélanie Baillairgé	Seuls	
2023	Samuel Larochelle, Ève Patenaude	Le plus petit sauveur du monde	
2023	Geneviève Bigué	Parfois les lacs brûlent	
2023	Iris Boudreau	Gervais et Conrad	
2023	Boucar Diouf, François Thisdale	Le Bourlingueur de Matungoua	
2023	Maude Nepveu-Villeneuve, Agathe Bray-Bourret	Je t'écris de mon lit	
2024	Ovila Fontaine, Charlotte Parent	Le premier arbre de Noël	
2024	Marie-Andrée Arsenault, Dominique Leroux	Le fil d'Alphée	
2024	Iris Boudreau, Richard Écrapou	Margot veut une moustache	
2024	Marianne Ferrer	Jour d’orage	
2024	Caroline Merola	Histoires fantastiques (et peut-être vraies)	
2025	Stéphane Laporte, Jacques Goldstyn	Un cadeau de Noël en novembre	
2025	Jocelyn Boisvert, Enzo	Le livre aspirateur	
2025	Annick Lefebvre, Vincent Partel-Valette	En crise	
2025	Charlotte Parent	Murielle et le mystère	
2025	Catherine Trudeau, Qin Leng	Le tasse de Gilles	
2026	Orbie	À l'enVERRE	
2026	Éric Dupont, Mathilde Cinq-Mars	Nos poissons	
2026	Alizée Goulet, Laurence Goulet-Tremblay	Minuit sonne et farandole	
2026	Eve Patenaude	Fleurs de verre	
2026	Erika Soucy, Geneviève Bigué	La maison cachette	

== See also ==
- Governor General's Award for French-language young people's literature - text
- Governor General's Award for English-language young people's literature - illustrated books
- Governor General's Award for English-language young people's literature - text
