= 1989 Governor General's Awards =

Canadian literary award

Each winner of the 1989 Governor General's Awards for Literary Merit received $5000 and a medal from the Governor General of Canada. The winners and nominees were selected by a panel of judges administered by the Canada Council for the Arts.

== English ==
Category	Winner	Nominated
Fiction	Paul Quarrington, Whale Music	Ann Copeland, The Golden Thread; Helen Weinzweig, A View from the Roof
Non-fiction	Robert Calder, Willie: The Life of W. Somerset Maugham	Janice Boddy, Wombs and Alien Spirits; Robert MacNeil, Wordstruck; Dale A. Russell, An Odyssey in Time: The Dinosaurs of North America
Poetry	Heather Spears, The Word for Sand	Tim Lilburn, Tourist to Ecstasy; Stephen Scobie, Dunino
Drama	Judith Thompson, The Other Side of the Dark	Tomson Highway, Dry Lips Oughta Move to Kapuskasing; John Krizanc, Tamara
Children's literature	Diana Wieler, Bad Boy	Kit Pearson, The Sky is Falling; Eliane Corbeil Roe, Circle of Light
Children's illustration	Robin Muller, The Magic Paintbrush	Michèle Lemieux, A Gift from Saint Francis; Jan Thornhill, The Wildlife 123
French to English translation	Wayne Grady, On the Eighth Day	Arlette Francière, Kaleidoscope; Donald Winkler, Rose and Thorn

== French ==
Category	Winner	Nominated
Fiction	Louis Hamelin, La Rage	Robert Lalonde, Le Diable en personne; Jacques Poulin, Le Vieux Chagrin
Non-fiction	Lise Noël, L'Intolérance : une problématique générale	Jean Éthier-Blais, Fragments d'une enfance; Pierre Morency, L'Oeil américain
Poetry	Pierre DesRuisseaux, Monème	Christiane Frenette, Cérémonie mémoire; Élise Turcotte, La Terre est ici
Drama	Michel Garneau, Mademoiselle Rouge	Michel Marc Bouchard, Les Muses orphelines; Robert Claing, La Femme d'intérieur
Children's literature	Charles Montpetit, Temps mort	Jacques Lazure, Le Domaine des Sans Yeux; Joceline Sanschagrin, La Fille aux cheveux rouges
Children's illustration	Stéphane Poulin, Benjamin et la saga des oreillers	Frédéric Back, L'Homme qui plantait des arbres; Philippe Béha, Mais que font les fées avec toutes ces dents?
English to French translation	Jean Antonin Billard, Les Âges de l'amour	Ronald Guévremont, Comme un vent chaud de Chine; Christine Klein-Lataud, Un Oiseau dans la maison
