= Gérard DuBois =

French illustrator

- Born: 1968 (age 57–58); Argenteuil, France
- Known for: illustration
- Awards: Hamilton King Award, 2017; Multiple Society of Illustrators medal-winner

Gérard DuBois (born 1968) is a French illustrator. In 2017, he received the Hamilton King Award. DuBois works in a variety of styles, which have been described as a consistent and remarkable blend of beauty, passion, and intelligence.

== Early life and education ==
DuBois, an only child, grew up in Argenteuil, a suburban town north of Paris. No member of his family was artistic. The idea of art as a career option was introduced to DuBois at the age of fourteen, when the headmistress of his public school, having become aware of his drawings in notebooks, encouraged him to apply for advanced study at an art school in Paris. DuBois passed the aptitude tests required for admission and entered the school, a century-old institute in St. Germain des Prés, known to most as Rue Madame. Upon completion of his studies at Rue Madame, he enrolled for an advanced degree at École Supérieure des Arts Estienne, also in Paris. After completing his studies at École Estienne, and obliged to serve France for two years, in 1989 he arrived in the Maritime provinces of Canada to serve as a graphic designer for the French Ministry of Cooperation where he worked at various magazines in Petit Rocher, New Brunswick, Yarmouth, Nova Scotia, Caraquet, New Brunswick and Summerside, Prince Edward Island.

== Illustration career ==
DuBois would receive his first freelance illustration assignment after moving to Montreal in 1991 at the age of 23. The assignment would come from Jocelyne Fournel at Montreal Magazine. Fournel would go on to hire DuBois at other publications such as L'Actualité.

Although primarily noted for his extensive work as a book illustrator, his work has also appeared in The New York Times, The Wall Street Journal, Time magazine, GQ, Rolling Stone, The New Yorker, The Washington Post, Le Monde, The Guardian, Playboy, Newsweek, Entertainment Weekly, Harper's, The Atlantic and others. DuBois also illustrated an ongoing column for Time magazine by the editor Nancy Gibbs. as well as a weekly column called Gray Matter, a weekly opinion column for The New York Times Sunday Review by Mark R. Rank and Thomas A. Hirschl.

In April 2018, Canada Post released the Gérard DuBois stamp as one of five in the Great Canadian Illustrators series. The illustration selected for the stamp was titled It's Not a Stream of Consciousness and was originally published by The New York Times, in a Gray Matter opinion column under the same title by Gregory Hickok, May 8, 2015.

== Bibliography ==
=== Written and illustrated by the artist ===
- Enfantillages, published by Rouergue, 2015
- Henri au jardin d’enfants (Henri in kindergarten), published by Seuil, 2008

=== Illustrated by the artist ===
- Jamais l'un.e sans l'autre: Les célèbres duos de la littérature (Never one without the other: famous duets of literature), by Sophie Bliman, published by ACTES SUD, 2020
- RAGE by Orianne Charpentier, published by Gallimard Jeunesse, 2020
- J'aimerais by Stéphanie Demasse-Pottier, 2019
- Italian Folktales, (two volumes) The Folio Society,2019
- The Amazing Collection of Joey Cornell, by Candace Fleming, published by Penguin Random House,2018
- Frankenstein, by Mary Shelley, published by Gallimard Jeunesse, 2018
- Voici Colin (Here is Colin) with Christiane Duchesne, published by Lievredema 2018
- Renard Sans le Corbeau by Pascale Petit, published by Notari, 2018
- La Petite Ecuyère, by Charlotte Gingras, published by Les Editions Grasset, 2018
- La case de l'oncle Tom (Uncle Tom's Cabin) by Harriet Beecher-Stowe, published by Gallimard Jeunesse, 2017
- On aurait dit (Let's Pretend) by André Marois, published by Seuil Jeunesse, 2016
- Dorothea's Eyes: Dorothea Lange Photographs the Truth by Barb Rosenstock, published by Calkins Creek, 2016
- Au-delà de la forêt (Beyond The Forest) by Nadine Robert, published by COMMEGÉANT, 2016
- Un verger dans le ventre (an orchard in the belly) by Simon Boulerice, published by La courte échelle, 2013
- Révélations photographiques by Louise Bombardier, published by Les éditions du passage, 2013
- Arlequin, Charlot, Guignol & cie, by Bénédicte Riviere, published by ACTESSUD 2013
- Monsieur Marceau: Actor Without Words by Leda Schubert, published by Flash Point, 2012
- Vivre à Deux (Two's Company) by Jonathan Franzen, published by Alto, 2011
- Petits Fantômes Mélancoliques by Louise Bombardier published by Les 400 coups, 2008
- Darwin, by Elisabeth Laureau-Daull, published by Seuil Jeunesse, 2007
- Les aventures illustrées de Minette Accentiévitch (The Illustrated Adventures of Minette Accentiévitch) by Vladan Matijevic, published by Les Allusifs, 2007
- Stories for Young People: Edgar Allan Poe, edited by Andrew Delbanco, published by Sterling Publishing, 2006
- Le piano muet (The Silent Piano) by Gilles Vigneault, published by Les Editions Fides, 2002
- Riquet à la Houppe (Riquet with the Tuft) by André Marois, adapted by Charles Perrault, published by Les 400 coups, 2000

== As an educator ==
DuBois teaches at the Université du Québec à Montréal (UQAM).

== Awards ==
=== For illustration ===
In 2017 DuBois would win the Hamilton King Award from The Society of Illustrators, for Constructing the Modern Mind, art directed by Patricia Nemoto and Bernard Lee, at Scientific American

- Silver Medal for What Would You Do? published by Brown Alumni Magazine, Case Circle of Excellence award, 2018
- Gold Medal, for A sex life for priests?, art directed by Jocelyne Fournel at L'actualité, National Magazine Awards, 2017
- Gold Medal for Giant milk brick, art directed by Mélanie Baillairgé at BBDO Montreal, Society of Illustrators, 2012
- Gold Medal for Sacred Space, art directed by Emily Crawford and Andree Kahlmorgan at Time magazine, Society of Illustrators, 2011
- Silver Medal for Digging For Dollars, art directed by Ted Keller at GreenSource Magazine, Society of Publication Designers, 2011
- Gold Medal for NetworkerCover, art directed by Caren Rosenblatt, Society of Illustrators, 2009
- Silver Medal, Society of Illustrators, 2006
- Gold Medal, Society of Illustrators, 2005
- Silver Medal, Society of Illustrators, 2004
- 2021 Governor General's Award for French-language children's illustration - A qui appartiennent les nuages? (with Mario Brassard)

=== For books ===
- The Amelia Bloomer Book List, for Dorothea’s Eyes with Barbara Rosenstock, American Library Association, 2017
- Special Mention, Bologna Ragazzi Award for Enfantillages, 2016
- Norman A. Sugarman Children’s Biography Award for Monsieur Marceau with Leda Schubert, 2014
- Orbis Pictus Award for Monsieur Marceau with Leda Schubert, 2013

== Personal life ==
DuBois lives in Montreal with his wife Stephanie. The couple have had two children, Thomas and Nathan.
