= This Is the Year (novel) =

2025 novel by Gloria Muñoz

- First edition cover
- Author: Gloria Muñoz
- Publisher: Holiday House
- Publication date: January 7, 2025
- ISBN: 978-0-823-45836-3

This is The Year is a young adult novel by Gloria Muñoz, originally published on January 7, 2025, by Holiday House.

== Inspiration ==
Muñoz said that she was influenced by the increasing impacts of climate change on her home state of Florida, marine pollution, and exploitation of immigrant labor in the United States.

== Plot ==
In a near-future Florida ravaged by the climate crisis, seventeen-year-old Julieta "Juli" Villarreal is barely holding on. A self-proclaimed goth and aspiring writer, Juli lost her twin sister Ofe in a hit and run accident, and the grief has left her feeling hollow. She shuts out her friends, dodges her therapist, and keeps her worried mother at arm's length.

When a flashy corporate space program called Cometa shows up at her high school, Juli sees a way out. The program, run by tech giant StarCrest, wants to send fifteen teenagers to the Moon for five years to build humanity's first off-world colony. For Juli, it sounds like the perfect escape - a chance to leave behind a dying planet and her painful memories.

She throws herself into the training, convinced this is her future. But senior year has other plans. Juli makes unexpected friends, falls in love for the first time, and discovers a passion for roller skating. Her volunteer beach cleanups, once just a way to fill time, start to feel like they actually matter. Slowly, through these small acts of environmentalism and the people around her, she begins to find reasons to hope again.

As Florida continues to crumble under floods and extreme weather, Juli faces an impossible choice: leave everything behind for the stars, or stay and fight for her community alongside the people who love her.

== Reception ==
Kirkus Reviews called the novel a "worthy and special read", praising its prose and "post-apocalyptic setting". Mariah Smitala of School Library Journal praised the novel's poetry as "beautifully written", but said that the novel felt disjointed. Publishers Weekly called it a "thoughtful read".
