= Margaret Ferguson Books =

Margaret Ferguson Books is a publishing imprint that has been located at:

- Farrar, Straus and Giroux (2011-2017)
- Holiday House (2017-present)
