= 2024 Governor General's Awards =

Canadian literary award

The shortlisted nominees for the 2024 Governor General's Awards for Literary Merit were announced on October 8, 2024, and the winners were announced on November 13.

== English ==
Category	Winner	Nominated
Fiction	Jordan Abel, Empty Spaces	Paola Ferrante, Her Body Among Animals; Oonya Kempadoo, Naniki; Canisia Lubrin, Code Noir; Kent Monkman and Gisèle Gordon, The Memoirs of Miss Chief Eagle Testickle: Vol. 1: A True and Exact Accounting of the History of Turtle Island
Non-fiction	Niigaan Sinclair, Wînipêk: Visions of Canada from an Indigenous Centre	Helen Knott, Becoming a Matriarch; Petra Molnar, The Walls Have Eyes: Surviving Migration in the Age of Artificial Intelligence; Danny Ramadan, Crooked Teeth: A Queer Syrian Refugee Memoir; Astra Taylor, The Age of Insecurity: Coming Together as Things Fall Apart
Poetry	Chimwemwe Undi, Scientific Marvel	Brandi Bird, The All + Flesh; Bradley Peters, Sonnets from a Cell; Bren Simmers, The Work; Barbara Tran, Precedented Parenting
Drama	Caleigh Crow, There Is Violence and There Is Righteous Violence and There Is Death, or the Born-Again Crow	Makram Ayache, The Green Line; Scott Jones and Robert Chafe, I Forgive You; Mishka Lavigne, Shorelines; Pamela Mala Sinha, New
Children's literature	Li Charmaine Anne, Crash Landing	Cherie Dimaline, Into the Bright Open: A Secret Garden Remix; Shari Green, Song of Freedom, Song of Dreams; June Hur, A Crane Among Wolves; Kristy Jackson, Mortified
Children's illustration	Jean E. Pendziwol and Todd Stewart, Skating Wild on an Inland Sea	Danielle Daniel and Matt James, I'm Afraid, Said the Leaf; Adam de Souza, The Gulf; Thao Lam, One Giant Leap; Sydney Smith, Do You Remember?
French to English translation	Katia Grubisic, Nights Too Short to Dance (Marie-Claire Blais, Un cœur habité de mille voix)	Melissa Bull, Morel (Maxime Raymond Bock, Morel); Aleshia Jensen, So Long Sad Love (Mirion Malle, Adieu triste amour); Lazer Lederhendler, The Hollow Beast (Christophe Bernard, La bête creuse); Aimee Wall, Sadie X (Clara Dupuis-Morency, Sadie X)

== French ==
Category	Winner	Nominated
Fiction	Steve Poutré, Lait cru	Pascale Beauregard, Muette; Louis-Daniel Godin, Le Compte est bon; Emmanuelle Pierrot, La version qui n’intéresse personne; Mathieu Rolland, De grandes personnes
Non-fiction	Florence-Agathe Dubé-Moreau, Hors jeu : Chronique culturelle et féministe sur l’industrie du sport professionnel	Geneviève Boudreau, Une abeille suffit : Carnet d’observation d’un jardin urbain; Léa Clermont-Dion, Porter plainte; Jérôme Cotte, Oser l’humour éthique : De Socrate à Virginie Fortin; Stanley Péan, Noir satin
Poetry	Névé Dumas, poème dégénéré	Jonas Fortier, L'Air fou; Annie Landreville, Les couteaux dans ma gorge ne sont pas des fruits de mer; Olivier Leroux-Picard, Soleil sans heures; Emmanuel Simard, Lettres au ciel blanc
Drama	Sarah Berthiaume, Wollstonecraft	Olivier Choinière, La dernière cassette : Un portrait d’André Brassard; Isabelle Hubert, Rose; Geneviève Labelle and Mélodie Noël Rousseau, Ciseaux; Johanne Parent, Ornithorynques
Children's literature	Stéfani Meunier, Une bulle en dehors du temps	Moira-Uashteskun Bacon, Envole-toi, Mikun; Dominique Chicoine, Les quatre vérités; Marc-André Dufour-Labbé, Carreauté Kid; Jean-Guy Forget and Mélodie Bujold-Henri, Déménager au ciel
Children's illustration	Ovila Fontaine and Charlotte Parent, Le premier arbre de Noël	Marie-Andrée Arsenault and Dominique Leroux, Le fil d'Alphée; Iris Boudreau and Richard Écrapou, Margot veut une moustache; Marianne Ferrer, Jour d’orage; Caroline Merola, Histoires fantastiques (et peut-être vraies)
English to French translation	Éric Fontaine, Ristigouche : Le long cours de la rivière sauvage (Philip Lee, Restigouche: The Long Run of the Wild River)	Alexandre Fontaine Rousseau, Mourir pour la cause : Révolution dans le Québec des années 1960 (Chris Oliveros, Are You Willing to Die for the Cause? Revolution in 1960s Quebec); Daniel Grenier, Charlie Muskrat (Harold R. Johnson, Charlie Muskrat); Madeleine Stratford, Cours vers le danger (Sarah Polley, Run Towards the Danger: Confrontations with a Body of Memory); Sophie Voillot, La messagère (Thomas Wharton, The Book of Rain)
