= Sanschagrin =

Sanschagrin is a surname. Notable people with the surname include:

- Albert Sanschagrin (1911–2009), Canadian Roman Catholic bishop
- Joceline Sanschagrin (born 1950), Canadian writer
