= Matt Cohen (writer) =

Canadian writer

- Born: Matthew Cohen; December 30, 1942; Montreal, Quebec, Canada
- Died: December 2, 1999 (aged 56); Toronto, Ontario, Canada
- Occupations: Novelist, Children's writer
- Writing career
- Period: 1960s–1990s
- Notable works: Emotional Arithmetic, Elizabeth and After

Matthew Cohen (30 December 1942 – 2 December 1999) was a Canadian writer who published both mainstream literature under his own name and children's literature under the pseudonym Teddy Jam.

== History ==
Matt Cohen was born in Montreal, son of Morris Cohen and Beatrice Sohn, and was raised in Kingston and Ottawa. He studied political economy at the University of Toronto and taught political philosophy and religion at McMaster University in the late 1960s before publishing his first novel Korsoniloff in 1969.

His fiction was translated into German, Dutch, French, Greek, Spanish and Portuguese. The Spanish Doctor, his biggest international success, continues to sell well in the French and Spanish markets.

His greatest critical success as a writer was his final novel Elizabeth and After which won the 1999 Governor General's Award for English-language Fiction only a few weeks before his death. He had been nominated twice previously, but had not won, in 1979 for The Sweet Second Summer of Kitty Malone and in 1997 for Last Seen.

A founding member of the Writers' Union of Canada, he served on the executive board for many years and as president in 1986. During his presidency, the Writer's Union was finally able to persuade the government of Canada to form a commission and establish a Public Lending Right program. He also served on the Toronto Arts Council as chair of the Literary Division and was able to obtain increased funding for writers. In recognition of this work, he was awarded a Toronto Arts Award and the Harbourfront Prize.

He also published a number of children's books under the pseudonym Teddy Jam. Cohen's authorship of the Teddy Jam books was not revealed until after his death. Dr. Kiss, illustrated by Joanne Fitzgerald won the Governor General's Award in 1991 and Fishing Summer was also nominated for a Governor General's Award for children's literature in 1997, making Cohen one of the few writers ever to be nominated for Governor General's Awards in two different categories in the same year.

He was married three times; first to Arden Ford, next to Susan Bricker and then to Patsy Aldana.

Cohen died of lung cancer at home in Toronto. His final book of short stories, Getting Lucky, and his final Teddy Jam title, The Kid's Line, were posthumously published in 2001. A Canadian literary award, the Matt Cohen Award, is presented in Cohen's memory by the Writers' Trust of Canada.

A film adaptation of his 1990 novel Emotional Arithmetic has been produced by Triptych films starring Max von Sydow, Christopher Plummer, Gabriel Byrne and Susan Sarandon. It was the closing gala at the 2007 Toronto International Film Festival.

== Bibliography ==
Years link to corresponding year in literature or, for poetry, to year in poetry.

=== Novels ===
- Korsoniloff (1969)
- Johnny Crackle Sings (1971)
- The Disinherited (1974)
- Wooden Hunters (1975)
- The Colours of War (1977)
- The Sweet Second Summer of Kitty Malone (1979)
- Flowers of Darkness (1981)
- The Spanish Doctor (1984)
- Nadine (1987)
- Emotional Arithmetic (1990)
- Freud: The Paris Notebooks (1991)
- The Bookseller (1993)
- Last Seen (1997)
- Elizabeth and After (1999)

=== Short stories ===
- Columbus and the Fat Lady (1972)
- Too Bad Galahad (1972)
- Night Flights (1978)
- The Leaves of Louise (1978)
- The Expatriate (1982)
- Café le Dog (1983)
- Life on This Planet (1985)
- Living on Water (1988)
- Racial Memories (1990)
- Lives of the Mind Slaves (1994)
- Getting Lucky (2001)

=== Poetry ===
- Peach Melba (1974)
- In Search of Leonardo (1985)

=== Non-fiction ===
- Typing: A Life in 26 Keys (2000)

=== Children's literature (as "Teddy Jam") ===
- Night Cars (1987) illustrated by Eric Beddows
- Doctor Kiss Says Yes (1991) illustrated by Joanne Fitzgerald
- The Year of Fire (1993) illustrated by Ian Wallace
- The Charlotte Stories (1994)
- Jacob's Best Sisters (1996) illustrated by Joanne Fitzgerald
- The Fishing Summer (1997) illustrated by Ange Zhang
- This New Baby (1998)
- The Stoneboat (1999) illustrated by Ange Zhang
- ttuM (1999)
- The Kid Line (2001) illustrated by Ange Zhang

== See also ==
- Canadian literature
- Canadian poetry
- List of Canadian poets
- List of Canadian writers
