= Joanne Fitzgerald =

Canadian artist, illustrator and writer

- Born: 16 February 1956; Montreal, Quebec, Canada
- Died: 14 August 2011 (aged 55); Toronto, Ontario, Canada
- Occupations: Illustrator, writer
- Writing career
- Language: English
- Genres: Picture book artist, children's literature artist and writer

Joanne Fitzgerald was a Canadian artist, illustrator and writer. Twice-shortlisted for the Canadian Governor General's Award for Children's Illustration, her book Dr. Kiss Says Yes won the award in 1991.

== Early life and education ==
Fitzgerald was born in Montreal, Quebec, showing promise as an artist from an early age. She studied fine art at Mount Allison University, graduating with a Baccalaureate in Fine Arts in 1977.

== Career ==
Early in her career, Fitzgerald was a staff illustrator at the Royal Ontario Museum. Her subsequent work as a magazine illustrator brought her a following among children's magazine publishers, and drew her into children's textbook illustrations. In turn, she began to illustrate and then write children's books.

Later in life, she returned to fine art, studying and painting at the Art Students League of New York. She was also an early organizer of the Lymphedema Association of Ontario, and served as president and spokesperson in establishing the organization in 2002–2004.

== Works ==
=== Illustrated children's books ===
- Plain Noodles (also published as Baby Boat) (1989); story by Betty Waterton
- Emily's House (1990); story by Niko Scharer
- Doctor Kiss Says Yes (1991; re-issued 2012); story by Teddy Jam a.k.a. Matt Cohen
- Ten Small Tales (1993); story by Celia Barker Lottridge
- Jacob's Best Sisters (1996); story by Teddy Jam a.k.a. Matt Cohen
- The Little Rooster and the Diamond Button (2001); story by Celia Barker Lottridge
- When You Get A Baby (2002); story by Sharon Jennings
- Circus Play (2002); story by Anne Laurel Carter
- This is Me and Where I Am (2004); story by Joanne Fitzgerald
- The Blue Hippopotamus (2007); story by Phoebe Gilman
- Yum! Yum! (2008); story by Joanne Fitzgerald

== Awards and recognition ==
- Dr. Kiss Says Yes (1991) – Governor General's Award for English Language Children's Illustration
- Ten Small Tales (1993) – IODE Jean Throop Award
- The Little Rooster and the Diamond Button (2001) – Mr. Christie's Book Awards Diamond Pin
- The Blue Hippopotamus (2007) – Finalist: Governor General's Award for English Language Children's Illustration

== Joanne Fitzgerald Illustrator in Residence Award and Program ==
The Joanne Fitzgerald Illustrator in Residence Program was established in 2013 to honour Joanne Fitzgerald and her contributions to children's literature. The award and program are a joint project of the Canadian chapter of the International Board on Books for Young People (IBBY Canada), the Canadian Urban Libraries Council and participating libraries which have included the Toronto Public Library and the Edmonton Public Library.

The program awards a jury-selected, published Canadian children's book illustrator with a residency at a Canadian urban library each October. The winning Illustrator in Residence leads a program which explains and promotes children's book illustration. Activities include art activities for classes of children, presentations for adults, presentations at nearby high schools and colleges, portfolio reviews for aspiring illustrators, interviews with the press and the display of the illustrator's work in the library. Past winners join experts from the participating library and IBBY Canada as jurists for the following year.

Due to the global COVID-19 pandemic, the 2020 program was cancelled, with no winner chosen. Returning in 2021, the program now leverages emergent technology to provide an online, interactive experience between the illustrator and the adult and children audiences, extending the program's geographic availability.

=== Winners ===
Year	Winner	Participating Library & Residency Location
2013	Martha Newbigging	Toronto Public Libraries – Northern District Branch
2014	Patricia Storms	Toronto Public Libraries – Northern District Branch
2015	John Martz	Toronto Public Libraries – Northern District Branch
2016	Dianna Bonder	Edmonton Public Library – Stanley A Milner Branch
2017	Ashley Barron	Toronto Public Libraries – Northern District Branch
2018	Nahid Kazemi	Toronto Public Libraries – Northern District Branch
2019	Diego Herrera	Toronto Public Libraries – North York Central Branch
2020		2020 Program cancelled due to COVID
2021	Soyeon Kim	Toronto Public Libraries – In-branch & Virtual
2022	Sandra Dumais	Toronto Public Libraries – In-branch & Virtual
2023	Carey Sookocheff	Toronto Public Libraries – In-branch & Virtual
2024	Chelsea O'Byrne	Toronto Public Libraries – In-branch & Virtual
2025	Todd Stewart	Toronto Public Libraries – North York Central Branch
