= Prix Québec-Wallonie-Bruxelles de littérature de jeunesse =

The Prix Québec-Wallonie-Bruxelles de littérature de jeunesse is a literary award given out every two years for French language children's literature.

The award is given to writers and illustrators from Quebec and the French-speaking community of Belgium. Since 2005, one Quebec winner and one Belgian winner have been chosen. It is intended to encourage the development of children's literature in French and also to promote trade between Québec and Belgium.

== Winners ==
Year	Award recipient
1981	Françoise Souply-Clabots - illustration
1982	Raymond Plante - Monsieur Genou
1984	René Hausman - Le Grand Bestiaire, animaux d'Europe et d'Amérique du Nord
1985	Bertrand Gauthier (author), Daniel Sylvestre (illustrator) - Zunik
1987	Marie-José Sacré - Bon appétit, Monsieur Logre; Le Fantôme à tiques; Ballon, le Génie
1988	Ginette Anfousse - Les catastrophes de Rosalie
1989	Frédéric Dubus - Léonie dévore les livres
1990	Stéphane Poulin - Album de famille
1991	Lillo Canta - Magritte
1992	Jacques Lazure - Le Domaine des sans yeux
1994	Dominique Demers - Les Grands sapins ne meurent pas
1996	Christiane Duchesne - La Bergère de chevaux
1997	Rascal (author), Louis Joos (illustrator) - Le voyage d'Oregon
1998	Louise Leblanc - Deux amis dans la nuit
1999	Caroline Grégoire - Tonton René et tante Gilberte
2000	Anne Villeneuve - L'écharpe rouge
2001	Mario Ramos - Le Roi est occupé
2002	Michèle Marineau - Marion et le Nouveau monde
2003	Anne-Catherine De Boel - Koulkoul & Molokoloch
2005	Henriette Major (author), Philippe Béha (illustrator) - Les Devinettes d'Henriette
2005	Catherine Pineur - Plouf plouf ! Achille hésite
2007	Pierrette Dubé (author), Caroline Hamel (illustrator) - Maman s'est perdue
2007	David Merveille - Le Jacquot de Monsieur Hulot
2009	Dominique Demers - L'Élu: la grande quête de Jacob Jobin
2009	Jean-Marie Desfossez - Envol pour le paradis
2011	Claire Vigneault - Le chasseur de loups-marins
2011	Béa Deru-Bernard - Toute seule loin de Samarcande
2013	Gilles Tibo (author), Geneviève Després (illustrator)- Le petit chevalier qui n'aimait pas la pluie
2013	Françoise Rogier - C'est pour mieux te manger!
2015	Alain M. Bergeron (author), Pierre-Yves Cezard (illustrator) - Le géant qui sentait les petits pieds
2015	Mélanie Rutten - L'ombre de chacun
