= Paola Ferrante =

Canadian writer

Paola Ferrante is a Canadian writer from Toronto, Ontario, whose debut short story collection Her Body Among Animals was shortlisted for the Governor General's Award for English fiction at the 2024 Governor General's Awards.

She was previously shortlisted for the Gerald Lampert Award in 2020 for her poetry collection What to Wear While Surviving a Lion Attack, and for the Danuta Gleed Literary Award in 2024 for Her Body Among Animals.
