= Celia Barker Lottridge =

Canadian children's writer (born 1936)

Celia Barker Lottridge (born 1936) is a Canadian children's writer.

Lottridge was born in Iowa City, Iowa. She received a BA in modern European history from Stanford University, a MLS from Columbia University and a BEd from the University of Toronto. Lottridge worked as a librarian in San Diego, New York City and Rhode Island. She was a teacher and librarian for the Toronto School Board. From 1977 to 1990, she was a book buyer for a children's book store in Toronto.

== Books ==
- Gerasim and the Lion, illustrated by Joanne Page (Erin, ON: Bright Star Bookstores, 1979)
- The Juggler (Richmond Hill, ON: North Winds Press, 1985), Lottridge and Ariadna Ochrymovych
- Prairie Dogs (Toronto: Grolier, 1985), Lottridge and Susan Horner; bound with Bighorn Sheep by Bill Ivy; reprinted 1999, Grolier
- Mice (Grolier, 1986), Lottridge and Horner
- One Watermelon Seed), illus. Karen Patkau (Toronto: Stoddart Books, 1986), picture book
- The Name of the Tree: a Bantu Tale, illus. Ian Wallace, (Groundwood Books, 1989), reteller; U.S. edition 1990, Margaret K. McElderry Books
- Ten Small Tales, illus. Joanne Fitzgerald (McElderry, 1990), reteller; reprinted 2005, Groundwood
- The American Children's Treasury (Key Porter Books, 1991), editor
- Ticket to Curlew, illus. Wendy Wolsak-Frith (Groundwood, 1992), novel; published 1996 as Ticket to Canada, Silver Burdett; received the Geoffrey Bilson Award and the Canadian Library Association Book of the Year for Children Award
- Something Might Be Hiding, illus. Paul Zwolak, (Groundwood, 1994), picture book
- Music for the Tsar of the Sea: a Russian Wonder Tale, illus. Harvey Chan (Groundwood, 1995), reteller
- The Wind Wagon, illus. Daniel Clifford (Silver Burdett Press, 1995), novel
- Letters to the Wind: Classic Stories and Poems for Children (Key Porter, 1995), compiler; published 2001 as American Stories and Poems for Children
- Wings to Fly, illus. Mary Jane Gerber (Groundwood, 1997), novel
- Bounce Me, Tickle Me, Hug Me: Lap Rhymes and Play Rhymes from around the World, compiled by Sandra Carpenter-Davis (Toronto: Parent-Child Mother Goose Program, 1997), adaptor
- The Little Rooster and the Diamond Button: a Hungarian Folktale, illus. Joanne Fitzgerald (Groundwood, 2001), reteller; received Mr. Christie's Book Award
- Berta, a Remarkable Dog, illus. Elsa Myotte (Groundwood, 2002), novel
- Stories from the Life of Jesus: Stories from the Bible, illus. Linda Wolfsgruber (Groundwood, 2004), reteller
- Stories from Adam to Ezekiel; Retold from the Bible, illus. Gary Clement (Groundwood, 2004), reteller

== Sources ==
- Ten Small Tales
- Ten Small Tales: Stories from Around the World
- Home is Beyond the Mountains
- THE NAME OF THE TREE: A Bantu Folktale
