= Jabberwocky (book) =

Book by Lewis Carroll and Stéphane Jorisch

- Hardcover 1st edition (2004)
- Author: Lewis Carroll
- Illustrator: Stéphane Jorisch
- Language: English
- Series: Visions in Poetry
- Genres: Children; Fiction; Picture; Poetry
- Published: August 1, 2004
- Publisher: Kids Can Press
- Publication place: Canada
- Media type: Print: Hardcover, Paperback; Digital: Audiobook, Kindle Edition
- Pages: 40
- Award: Governor General’s Literary Award
- ISBN: 9781553370796

Jabberwocky is an illustrated version of Lewis Carroll's poem of the same name. The book is illustrated by Canadian artist Stéphane Jorisch. It was published in 2004 by Kids Can Press and won the 2004 Governor General’s Literary Award for English-language children's illustration.

== Synopsis ==
Jabberwocky is a nonsense poem written by English poet Lewis Carroll in 1871 and first published in his 1872 novel Through the Looking Glass and What Alice Found There. The poem, about a boy and his encounter with a creature called the Jabberwock, was originally written backwards, and Alice used a looking glass to decode it. In this iteration, Jorisch illustrates the poem with original artwork, giving Carroll's work a new and unexpected dimension.

== Awards ==
Jabberwocky won the 2004 Governor General's Award for English-language children's literature. The award is granted by the Canada Council for the Arts and was presented by Governor General Adrienne Clarkson at a ceremony held at Rideau Hall.

== Reception ==
The book was generally well received. Author Kenneth Oppel writes in the magazine Quill and Quire, "Jorisch has radically reinterpreted Carroll’s mock heroic ballad as a subversive commentary on totalitarianism and thought control." He goes on to say, "This is thought-provoking and sophisticated stuff, appropriate for teen readers possibly, but certainly not the audience for whom Carroll intended his poem." In CM Reviews, writer and artist Lorraine Douglas believes, "Teachers could use this book to spark discussion on its themes and also for creative writing." In addition, Douglas also finds that "Lewis Carroll's strange word juxtapositions are perfectly matched by Jorisch's visual surrealism."

== See also ==
- Jabberwocky
