= Yayo (illustrator) =

Canadian writer and illustrator (born 1961)

- Born: 1961 (age 64–65); Colombia

Diego Herrera, known as Yayo, (born 1961) is a Colombian-born Canadian writer and illustrator living in Montreal.

== Life ==
Born in Mesitas del colegio, he studied advertising art and fine arts, and came to Quebec in 1987. Yayo writes and illustrates children's books and also produces cartoons for Canadian and American newspapers and magazines. He has provided editorial cartoons for the magazine L'Actualité for a number of years. Yayo received the Charles Biddle Award in 2011, the prize from the 2012 Concours Lux for his illustrations for the book À bord de la grande roue and the Golden Smile from the First International Biennial of Caricature in Belgrade.

== Selected works ==
=== Books ===
- Au lit, au lit, princesse Émilie, text by Pierrette Dubé, received a Mr. Christie's Book Award in 1996
- Le chasseur d'arc-en-ciel, finalist for the Governor General's Literary Awards in 1998

=== Cartoon collections ===
- Le carton de Yayo
- Zoo-illogique
- Rêveries
