= Charlotte Parent =

Canadian illustrator

Charlotte Parent is a Canadian book illustrator from Quebec, who was co-winner with Ovila Fontaine of the Governor General's Award for French-language children's illustration at the 2024 Governor General's Awards for their book Le premier arbre de Noël.
