= Caroline Merola =

Canadian illustrator and author

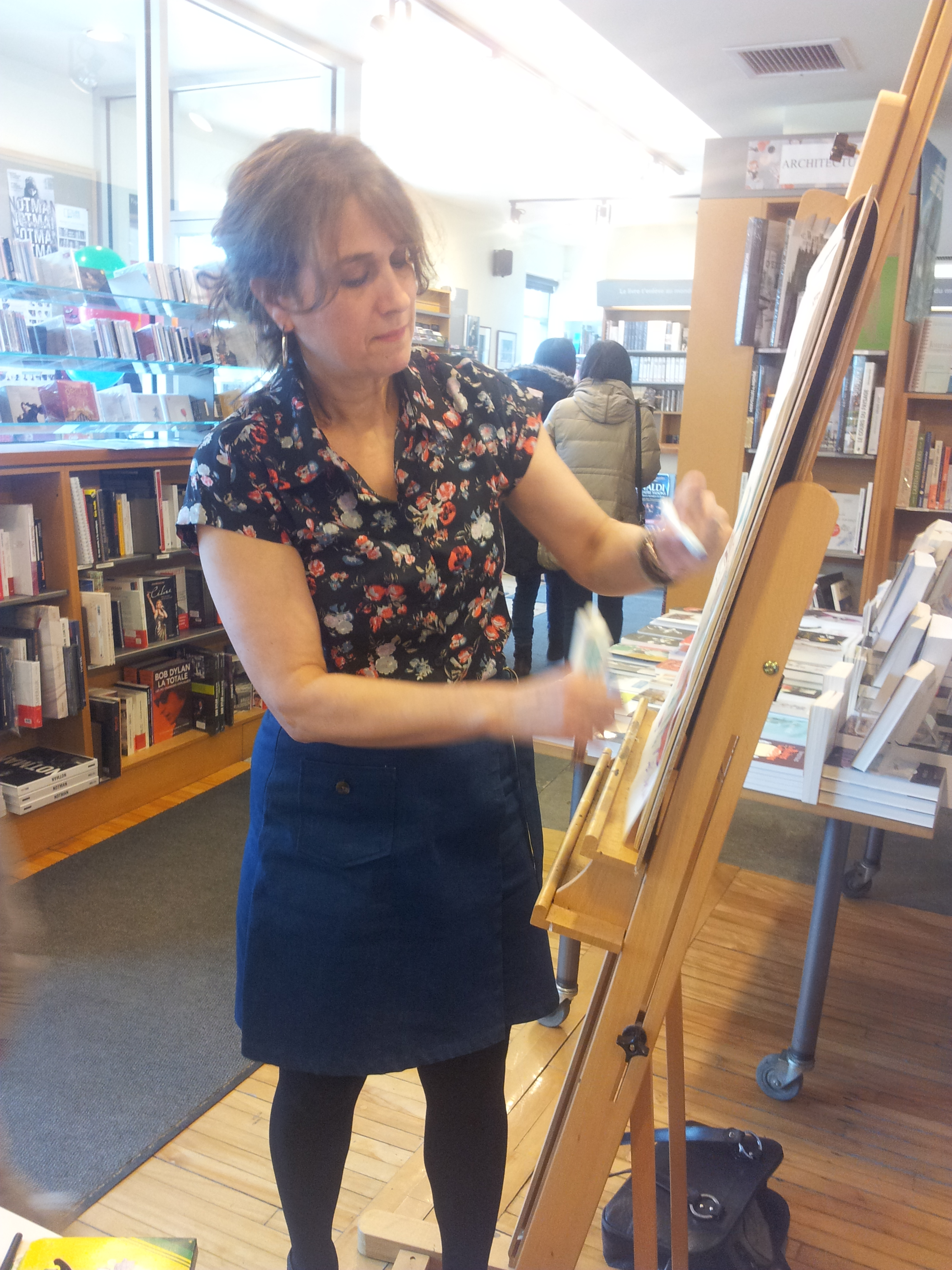
- Born: 1962 (age 63–64); Montreal, Quebec
- Writing career
- Genres: comic book, children's book

Caroline Merola (born 1962) is a Canadian illustrator and author living in Quebec.

== Life ==
Merola was born in Montreal, Quebec and received a college-level diploma in plastic arts from the Collège Jean-de-Brébeuf and a bachelor's degree in fine art from Concordia University.

Her children's books have been translated into English, Czech and Arabic.

She was host for the Télé-Métropole program Plexi-Mag and she contributed to the magazine Titanic.

In 1990, Merola received the Prix Onésime for Ma Meteor bleue. In 1999, her Le rêve du collectionneur received the Prix Coup de Coeur at the Festival de la bande dessinée francophone de Québec.

== Selected works ==
- Cent Dangers, comic book (1986)
- La maison truquée, comic book (1994)
- Le Rêve du collectionneur, comic book (1994)
- Le roi des loups, children's book (1998)
- N'aie pas peur, Nic, children's book (2001), finalist for a Mr. Christie's Book Award
- L'Amateur, comic book (2003)
- La vache qui lit, children's book (2004)
- Une nuit en ville, children's book (2007)
- Lili et les poilus, children's book (2011), received a Governor General's Award for French-language children's illustration
- La périlleuse aventure de la petite bestiole (2019)
