= Guillaume Perreault =

Canadian writer, illustrator and comic book author (born 1985)

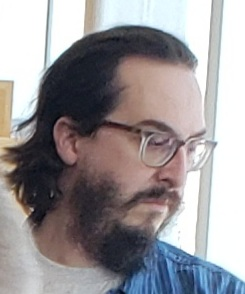
- Born: 1985 (age 40–41); Rimouski, Quebec, Canada
- Occupations: Writer, illustrator
- Notable work: Pet et Répète
- Awards: Governor General's Literary Award
- Website: guillaumeperreault.com

Guillaume Perreault (born in 1985) is a Canadian writer, illustrator, and comic book author originally from Rimouski, Quebec. He was awarded the Governor General's Award for French-language children's illustration for the novel Pet et Répète: La véritable histoire at the 2020 Governor General's Awards. He has also written and illustrated a children's comic series entitled The Postman from Space.

== Works ==
=== Comics ===
- Cumulus (Mécanique Générale, 2004)
- The Postman from Space series (La Pastèque)
1. Volume 1 (2016)
2. Volume 2: Les pilleurs à moteur (2019)
3. Volume 3: La faim du monde (2022)

=== Children's books ===
- Pet et Répète: La véritable histoire (with Katia Canciani, Fonfon, 2019)

== Awards ==
- 2020: Governor General Award for French-language young people's literature – Illustrated Books for Pet et Répète: la véritable histoire
- 2022: Librairie du Québec prize in the Québec youth category for La soupe aux allumettes, with Patrice Michaud
