= Marie-Francine Hébert =

Canadian author from Quebec (born 1943)

Marie-Francine Hébert (born March 24, 1943) is a Canadian author from Quebec.

Born in Montreal, she writes mainly for younger audiences. In a poll by Communication-Jeunesse, she was one of the five best-loved authors in Quebec. Besides books, Hébert also writes for the stage and for television.

In 2015, she was chosen by the Centre québécois de ressources en littérature pour la jeunesse of the Bibliothèque et Archives nationales du Québec as a candidate for the Astrid Lindgren Memorial Award.

== Selected works ==
=== Youth literature ===
- Venir au monde (1987), received the Prix Alvine-Bélisle, translated into English, German, Italian, Spanish
- Le cœur en bataille (1990)
- Je t'aime, je te hais (1991)
- Sauve qui peut l'amour (1992)
- Décroche-moi la lune (2001), received the Mr. Christie's Book Award
- Mon rayon de soleil (2002), received the Mr. Christie's Book Award and the Prix Alvine-Bélisle
- Nul poisson où aller (2002), received the Prix Alvine-Bélisle and the Prix Marcel-Couture
- Le ciel tombe à côté (2003), received the Mr. Christie's Book Award

=== Theatre ===
- Cé tellement cute des enfants (1980)
- Oui ou Non (1988), was a finalist for a Governor General's Awards for Literary Merit in 1988

=== Television ===
- Iniminimagimo
- Klimbo
- Les quatre saisons dans la vie de Ludovic
