= Mathieu Rolland =

Canadian writer (born 1989)

Mathieu Rolland (born 1989) is a Canadian writer from Montreal, Quebec, whose debut novel Souvenir de Night was published in 2020.

Prior to launching his career as a writer, Rolland studied translation at Concordia University, and directed several short films before launching a career in advertising.

His second novel, De grandes personnes, was published in 2023. The book received a Governor General's Award nomination for French-language fiction at the 2024 Governor General's Awards.
