= Danielle Marcotte =

Canadian writer living in Quebec (born 1950)

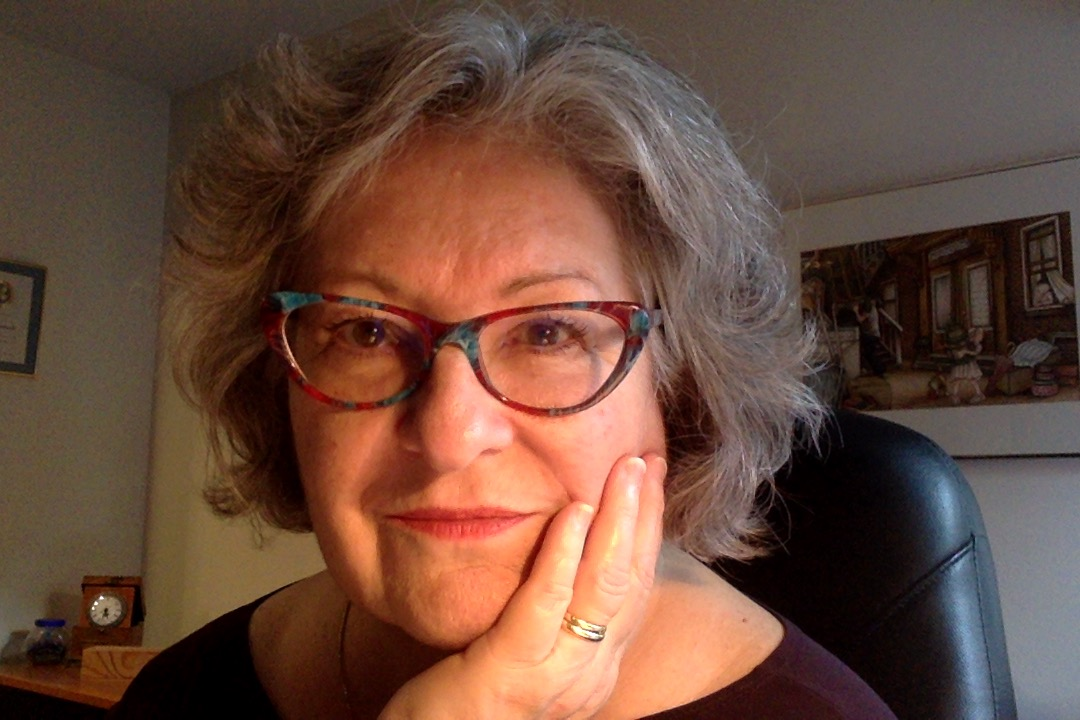
- Born: April 1950 (age 76); Montreal, Quebec
- Writing career
- Genre: Children's books

Danielle Marcotte (born April 1950) is a Canadian writer living in Quebec.

She was born in Montreal and received a bachelor's degree in literature and a master's degree in adult education. Marcotte has worked in media relations, journalism, teaching, editing and communications. From 2004 to 2009, she was responsible for promoting reading for the Department of Education in the Swiss Canton of Jura.

Marcotte married the Swiss politician Pierre-Alain Gentil, who died in 2008. She returned to Quebec in autumn 2009.

== Selected works ==
- Poil de serpent, dent d'araignée (1996), received a Mr. Christie's Book Award
- La légende de Jos Montferrand (2001)
- Les Sabots rouges (2004), nominated for a Governor General's Literary Award
- Au lit, Moka! (2010), awarded second place in the category children's book at the Alcuin Society Awards
