= Lucie Papineau (writer) =

Canadian writer

Lucie Papineau (born April 26, 1962) is a writer living in Quebec, Canada who mainly writes children's books.

== Biography ==
She was born in Longueuil, Quebec and received a bachelor's degree in communications from the Université du Québec à Montréal. From 1987 to 1989, she wrote for Petit Devoir, a weekly insert in Le Devoir for children 6 to 12 years old. Since 1990, she has been a regular contributor to Magazine Enfants Québec, writing a column about children's books. Papineau is director for baby books and picture books for the publisher Dominique et compagnie.

Her first novel La Dompteuse de perruche, published in 1990, received an award from the Association canadienne d'éducation de langue française. Her 1991 novel La Dompteuse de rêves received the prize "Livres 92" awarded by the Association des consommateurs du Québec. In 1998, she published Pas de taches pour une girafe, illustrated by Marisol Sarrazin, which received a Mr. Christie's Book Award.

Several of her books include CDs where the author reads or sings the stories for young listeners. Many of her books have been translated into English.

== Selected works ==
- Des bleuets dans mes lunettes (1992)
- Casse-Noisette (1996), nominated for a Governor General's Literary Award
- Les boutons du pirate (1997)
- Un chant de Noel (2004), based on Charles Dickens' A Christmas Carol, illustrated by Stephane Poulin, received a Governor General's Literary Award for illustration
- Les amis de Gilda la girafe (2007)
- Mon pyjama à moi (2007)
- Patatras la panthère (2008)
- Mon premier amour (2009), illustrated by Virginie Egger, nominated for a Governor General's Literary Award for illustration
- Méchant Coco - le journal secret de Jojo Sapino (2010)
- Les schmoucks (2011)
