= Steve Poutré =

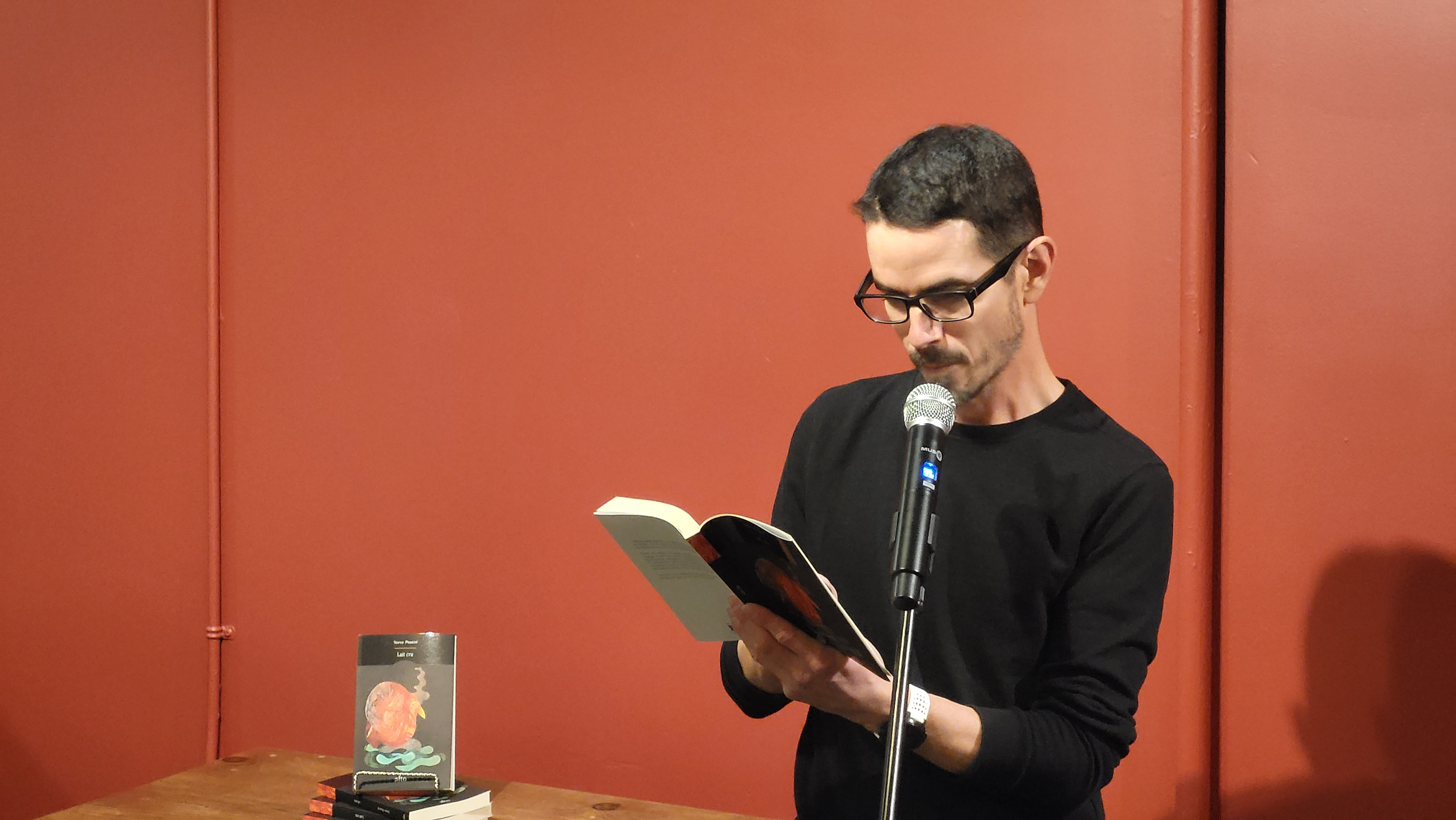
Image of Steve Poutré

Steve Poutré (born 1979) is a Canadian writer from Quebec, whose novel Lait cru won the Governor General's Award for French-language fiction at the 2024 Governor General's Awards.

Poutré, who grew up on a dairy farm in Saint-Ignace-de-Stanbridge, Quebec, worked as a graphic designer before writing Lait cru.
