= Louise Leblanc =

Canadian writer living in Quebec (born 1942)

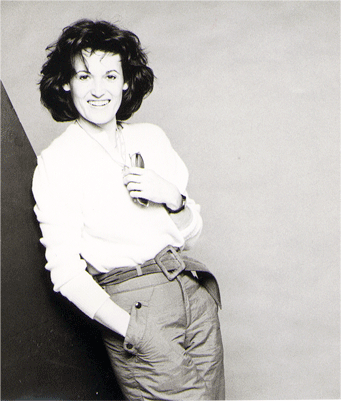
Louise Leblanc

Louise Leblanc (born June 10, 1942) is a Canadian writer living in Quebec.

She was born in Montreal and studied education at the Université de Montréal. Leblanc taught French and history and later worked as a researcher for television, as a freelance journalist for various magazines and as an advertising copywriter. In 1980, she published a collection of humorous observations 'l'Homme objet; that was followed by a novel 37½ AA in 1983 which won the Prix Robert-Cliche. In 1985, Leblanc wrote the script for the Radio-Canada television film Archimède. She has continued to write for television, including the series Les Enquêtes de Chlorophylle and several episodes for the series Watatatow. Leblanc has also published a number of short stories.

== Selected works ==
- Pop Corn, novel (1986)
- Le sang de l'or, novel (1989)
- Ça suffit Sophie!, juvenile fiction (1990)
- Sophie lance et compte!, juvenile fiction (1996)
- Deux amis dans la nuit, juvenile fiction (1996), received the Prix Québec-Wallonie-Bruxelles
