= Pet et Répète =

Novel by Katia Canciani

- Hardcover first edition
- Author: Katia Canciani
- Illustrator: Guillaume Perreault
- Language: French
- Genres: Children; fiction
- Published: 2019
- Publisher: Fonfon
- Publication place: Canada
- Media type: Print: Hardcover; Digital: ebook
- Pages: 32
- Award: Governor General's Literary Award
- ISBN: 9782924984123

Pet et Répète: La véritable histoire is a French novel written by Canadian author Katia Canciani, illustrated by Guillaume Perreault, and published in 2019 by Fonfon. It won the 2020 Governor General's Literary Award for French-language children's illustration.

== Synopsis ==
Pet et Répète: La véritable histoire is the real story of a couple of jokers, who are twin brothers. One has gas and the other is hard of hearing, hence why their mother had the sense to name one Pet and the other Répète. The story is of Pete (Pet) and Repeat (Répète) who are off on a boat. Pete falls off the boat and Repeat stays on it.

== Awards ==
Pet et Répète: La véritable histoire won the 2020 Governor General's Award for French-language children's illustration at the 2020 Governor General's Awards, and was chosen by students across Canada for the 2021 Forest of Reading Award winners.

== Reception ==
The novel has been generally well received in Canada. Marie Fradette wrote in Le Devoir: "This mischievous fable with great possibilities certainly deserves to be discovered, re-read and repeated loud and clear". In the French-language news magazine L'actualité, Christian Lalonde characterized Canciani's writing as having "sensitivity, and humanist values".
