= The Postman from Space =

Comic series by Guillaume Perreault

Publication information
- Publisher: Holiday House
- Format: Ongoing series
- Genre: Children's comics
- Publication date: 2016
- No. of issues: 1

Creative team
- Written by: Guillaume Perreault

The Postman from Space is a children's comics series written and illustrated by Guillaume Perreault from Quebec, Canada, and published by La Pastèque. It has also been adapted into a children's animated series in French, produced by La Pastèque and Urbania, and a French podcast series produced by La Pastèque in collaboration with La puce à l'oreille. Publishers Weekly recommended the comics for children ages seven and older. The comics were translated into English by Françoise Bui. The English translation of the comics were published by Holiday House.

== Synopsis ==
Bob is an intergalactic mail carrier who loves his job. His daily duty is to deliver letters and parcels throughout the galaxy filled with disparate and bizarre planets, odd extraterrestrials and strange spatial surprises. Bob is determined to achieve his mission to make sure every delivery reaches its destination in the galaxy.

== Main characters ==
- Bob - postman: Driven, dedicated and sweet-natured, Bob has a tendency to lose his temper when his daily routine is disrupted. He loves his job and he does it well, driven by his motto: "The mail is sacred".
- Odile - postal worker, mechanical division: Handy, optimistic and adventurous (but also impulsive and easily distracted), Odile loves company and is a lot of fun. She is the best co-pilot anyone could ask for.
- Gunther - postman: Jealous, mischievous, and conceited, Gunther feels misunderstood and wants the world to see and appreciate his true worth. In his efforts to stand out, he somehow always ends up causing trouble. He lives in the vain hope of being crowned Employee of the Month, when he should really be focusing his energy on learning to accept himself for who he is.

== The Postman from Space in other media ==
=== TV series ===
An animated television series adaptation of the comic was released in 2022 and consists of 9 five-minute episodes. The series was produced by La Pastèque and URBANIA.

=== Podcast ===
The podcast The Postman from Space comprises 6 episodes of 20 minutes aimed at children aged 6-9 years old. Each episode is accompanied by an educational sheet for use in the classroom.

=== Game ===
An interactive web game based on the comic was released as a tie-in to the animated series. In this game, a package has slipped by mistake into the ship of Gontrand, a colleague of Bob and Odile. They have to catch up with Gontrand and intercept the delivery of this package, but Gontrand has no intention of being caught easily. In addition to avoiding collisions with planets, asteroids and intergalactic debris, the player must pick up packages and thrusters that will give him speed in order to catch Gontrand.

== Reception ==
The Postman from Space is well received in the field of children's books. In 2016, the French original version won awards at Salon du livre et de la presse jeunesse de Montreuil and 3x3 Illustration Annual No. 13. In 2017, it also got the award Tamarac Express and made the finalists lists of Prix Bédélys as well as Prix jeunesse des libraires du Québec.
