= Elizabeth and After =

1999 novel by Matt Cohen

- Author: Matt Cohen
- Publisher: Picador USA
- Publication date: August 1, 2000
- ISBN: 978-0-312-26151-1

Elizabeth and After is a novel by Matt Cohen, first published in 1999 by Knopf Canada. His final novel, it won the Governor General's Award for English-language fiction just a few weeks before Cohen's death.

== Plot summary ==
The story is about the lives of a few people living in a small town north of Kingston, Ontario. Carl McKelvey, a "white trash male" as he describes himself, returns to the town after a three-year absence in the hope that he can live with his daughter again, and maybe even renew his relationship with his ex-wife, Chrissy. He carries deep in his heart his guilt of having driven his car into a tree, killing his mother, Elizabeth, many years earlier.

Elizabeth's sudden death ended not only an unhappy marriage she had with William McKelvey, a failed farmer, but also a secret relationship she had with Adam Goldsmith, Carl's real father. Elizabeth might have felt that the uncultured McKelvey ruined her life, or she might be too frightened to ruin her life herself by leaving him. In either case, her life has affected McKelvey, Adam and Carl so deeply that her influence is still felt eleven years later.

When Carl is attacked by Fred (Chrissy's boyfriend), Adam, even though reserved and gentle-natured, decides to do something for his son. Adam takes Fred in his car and drives him into the same tree that Elizabeth's car crashed into eleven years earlier. Both Adam and Fred are killed instantly. Carl learns about his relationship with Adam in a letter Adam left for him.

== Reception ==
Elizabeth and After received positive reviews. Kirkus Reviews described the novel as "An extremely satisfying work, finding new depth in old themes, and offering a fitting memorial to a talented, deeply humane writer." Publishers Weekly wrote that Cohen's "empathy and compassion, and his delicate depiction of loss and longing in a closely knit community, haunt his narrative."

Booklist also reviewed the novel.
