= Mr. Christie's Book Awards =

Annual literary award

The Mr. Christie's Book Awards (French: Prix du livre M. Christie) was a Canadian literary prize awarded by Christie, Brown & Company, a division of Nabisco. The awards were discontinued in 2004. The awards were generally considered to be the "Giller Prize for children's authors".

== History ==
The awards were established to promote excellence in Canadian children's literature. The recipients were required to be Canadian citizens or permanent residents. The prize was first awarded in 1990. Initially, awards were given for text and illustrations in English and French language books, a total of four categories. In 1993, the categories for text were divided based on age: one for ages 8 or less and one for ages 9 to 14. In 1994, it was decided that text and illustrations would no longer be judged separately and the number of age categories was increased to three: age 7 and under, ages 8 to 11 and ages 12 to 16.

== Winners ==
=== English-language winners ===
Mr. Christie's Book Award winners
Year	Category	Contributor(s)	Title	Ref.
1990	Illustration	Ian Wallace, written by Celia Barker Lottridge	The Name of the Tree	
1990	Text	Kit Pearson	The Sky Is Falling	
1991	Illustration	Kady MacDonald Denton, written by Betty Gibson	The Story of Little Quack	
1991	Text	Brian Doyle	Covered Bridge	
1992	Illustration	Barbara Reid	Zoe series	
1992	Text	Dennis Lee	The Ice Cream Store	
1993	Illustration	Jo Bannatyne-Cugnet, illus. by Yvette Moore	A Prairie Alphabet	
1993	Text, 8 and under	Sheree Fitch	There Were Monkeys in My Kitchen	
1993	Text, 9 to 14	Janet Lunn and Christopher Moore	The Story of Canada	
1994	7 and under	Berny Lucas, illus. by Russ Willms	Brewster Rooster	
1994	8 to 11	Leo Yerxa	Last Leaf First Snowflake To Fall	
1994	8 to 11	Song Nan Zhang	A Little Tiger in the Chinese Night	
1994	12 and up	Diana Wieler	RanVan the Defender	
1995	7 and under	W. D. Valgardson, illus. by Ange Zhang	Thor	
1995	8 to 11	Barbara Greenwood, illus. by Heather Collins	A Pioneer Story: The Daily Life of a Canadian Family in 1840	
1995	12 and up	Sarah Ellis	Out of the Blue	
1996	7 and under	Nan Gregory, illus. by Ron Lightburn	How Smudge Came	
1996	8 to 11	Mordecai Richler, illus. by Norman Eyolfson	Jacob Two-Two’s First Spy Case	
1996	12 and up	Joan Clark	The Dream Carvers	
1997	7 and under	Don Gillmor, illus. by Marie-Louise Gay	The Fabulous Song	
1997	8 to 11	Shelley Tanaka, illus. by Laurie McGaw	Discovering the Iceman	
1997	12 and up	Brian Doyle	Uncle Ronald	
1998	7 and under	Barbara Nichol, illus. by Philippe Béha	Biscuits in the Cupboard	
1998	8 to 11	Kevin Major with Imelda George (wood carvings) and Ned Pratt (photography)	The House of the Wooden Santas	
1998	12 and up	Kenneth Oppel	Silverwing	
1999	7 and under	Marilyn Helmer, illus. by Paul Mombourquette	Fog Cat	
1999	8 to 11	Richard Scrimger	The Nose From Jupiter	
1999	12 and up	William Bell	Zack	
2000	7 and under	Maxine Trottier and Rajka Kupesic	Claire’s Gift	
2000	8 to 11	Kenneth Oppel	Sunwing	
2000	12 and up	Martha Brooks	Being with Henry	
2001	7 and under	Stephanie McLellan, illus. by Sean Cassidy	The Chicken Cat	
2001	8 to 11	Jean Little	Willow & Twig	
2001	12 and up	Janet McNaughton	The Secret Under My Skin	
2002	7 and under	Celia Barker Lottridge, illus. by Joanne Fitzgerald	The Little Rooster and the Diamond Button	
2002	8 to 11	Polly Horvath	Everything on a Waffle	
2002	12 and up	Arthur Slade	Dust	
2003	7 and under	Anne Laurel Carter, illus. by Alan and Lea Daniel	Under a Prairie Sky	
2003	8 to 11	Alan Cumyn	The Secret Life of Owen Skye	
2003	12 and up	Joan Clark	The Word for Home	
2004	7 and under	Jean Little, illus. by Werner Zimmermann	Pippin the Christmas Pig	
2004	8 to 11	Sarah Ellis, illus. by Bruno St-Aubin	The Several Lives of Orphan Jack	
2004	12 and up	Martine Leavitt	Tom Finder	

=== French-language winners ===
Prix du livre M. Christie winners
Year	Category	Contributor(s)	Title
1990	Illustration	Philippe Béha, written by Michel Luppens	Mais que font les fées avec toutes ces dents?
1990	Text	Ginette Anfousse	Rosalie s'en va-t-en guerre
1991	Illustration	Pierre Pratt, written by Bénédict Froissart	Les fantasies de l'oncle Henri
1991	Text	François Gravel	Zamboni
1992	Illustration	Stéphane Poulin	Un voyage pour deux
1992	Text	Christiane Duchesne	Bibitsa, ou, l'étrange voyage de Clara Vic
1993	Illustration	Dominique Jolin	C'est pas juste!
1993	Text, 8 and under	Gilles Gauthier	Le gros problème du petite Marcus
1993	Text, 9 to 14	Dominique Demers	Un hiver de tourmente
1994	7 and under	Joceline Sanschagrin, illus. by Hélène Desputeaux	Caillou: La petite soeurCaillou: Le petit pot
1994	8 to 11	Christiane Duchesne	La 42e soeur de Bébert
1994	12 and up	Dominique Demers	Les grands sapins ne meurent pas
1995	7 and under	Rémy Simard, illus. by Pierre Pratt	Mon chien est un éléphant
1995	8 to 11	Denis Côté	Le Parc aux sortilèges
1995	12 and up	Raymond Plante	L'Étoile a pleuré rouge
1996	7 and under	Pierrette Dubé, illus. by Yayo	Au lit, au lit, princesse Émilie
1996	8 to 11	Christiane Duchesne	La Bergère de chevaux
1996	12 and up	Jean Lemieux, illus. by Anie Massey	Le Trésor de Brion
1997	7 and under	Danielle Marcotte, illus. by Stéphane Poulin	Poil de serpent dent d’araignée
1997	8 to 11	Robert Davidts, illus. by Francis Back	Jean-Baptiste, coureur des bois
1997	12 and up	Jacques Lazure	Le Rêve couleur d’orange
1998	7 and under	Lucie Papineau, illus. by Marisol Sarrazin	Pas de taches pour un girafe
1998	8 to 11	Dominique Demers	La Mystérieuse Bibliothecaire
1998	12 and up	Robert Soulières	Un cadavre de classe
1999	7 and under	Robert Soulières, illus. by Anne Villeneuve	Une gardienne pour Étienne
1999	8 to 11	Gilles Tibo	Rouge timide
1999	12 and up	Jean-Michel Schembré	Les citadel les du vertige
2000	7 and under	Marie-Louise Gay	Stella étoile de la mer
2000	8 to 11	Gilles Tibo and Jean Berneche	Les yeux noirs
2000	12 and up	Stanley Péan	Le temps s’enfuit
2001	7 and under	Dominique Demers, illus. by Stéphane Poulin	Vieux Thomas et la petite fée
2001	8 to 11	François Gravel, illus. by Pierre Pratt	David et le Fantôme
2001	12 and up	Michèle Marineau	Rouge poison
2002	7 and under	Marie-Francine Hébert, illus. by Mylène Pratt	Décroche-moi la lune
2002	8 to 11	Hélène Vachon, illus. by Yayo	L’oiseau de passage
2002	12 and up	Jacques Lazure	Llddz
2003	7 and under	Marie-Francine Hébert, illus. by Steve Adams	Mon rayon de soleil
2003	8 to 11	Sylvain Trudel, illus. by Suzane Langlois	Pourquoi le monde est comme il est?
2003	12 and up	Denis Côté	L’Empire couleur sang
2004	7 and under	Dominique Demers, illus. by Stéphane Poulin	L'oiseau des sables
2004	8 to 11	Charlotte Gingras, illus. by Stéphane Jorisch	La boîte à bonheur
2004	12 and up	Marie-Francine Hébert	Le ciel tombe à côté
