= The Shepherd's Granddaughter =

2008 children's novel by Anne Laurel Carter

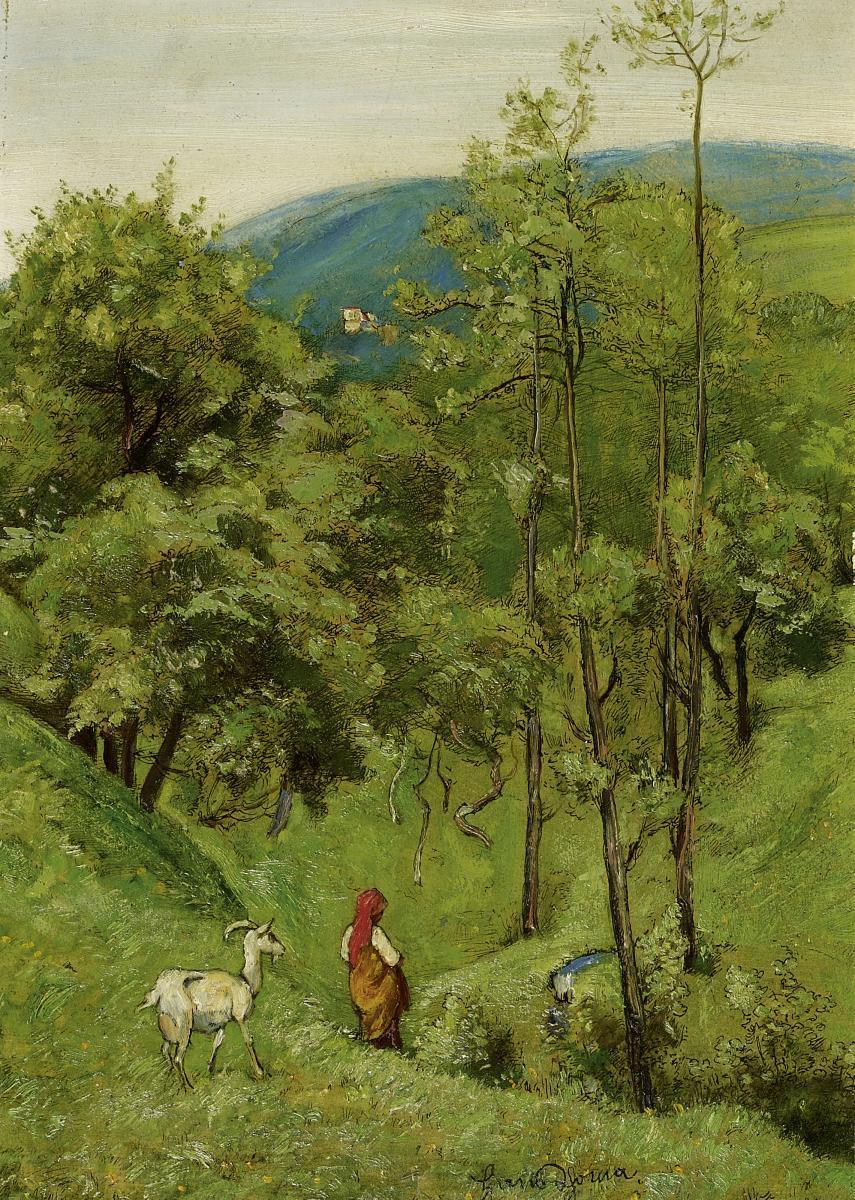
- Shepherd Girl with a goat in the meadow of rolling hills, oil painting by Hans Thoma (1839–1924)
- Author: Anne Laurel Carter
- Cover artist: Sophie Elbaz/Sygma/Corbis (photographer)
- Genre: Juvenile fiction (11+)
- Published: December 2008
- Publisher: Groundwood Books
- Publication place: Canada
- Pages: 221 pp.

The Shepherd's Granddaughter is a children's novel by Anne Laurel Carter published in 2008. It provides a fictional account of the complex situation between the Jewish and Muslim communities in Palestine, which is seen through the eyes of Amani, a Palestinian girl six years old when the story begins, who sees the land of her ancestors stolen from her family. The issues behind the conflict are too complex for Amani's naïve understanding, but her way of expressing the situation is moving. Carter was inspired to write the novel by her meeting with Palestinians who were living through similar situations that she writes about in the book.

The Shepherd's Granddaughter is a story of courage and determination where family unity overcomes all else. It portrays a duality between ancestral ways of living and modern times in the contemporary Palestinian conflict setting. The role of women in society is also a major theme throughout the novel. The author manages to adapt mature subject matter for a young audience in an accomplished way. "The Shepherd's Granddaughter is a well-intentioned, very earnest narrative that aims to foster international harmony by educating young readers. A portion of the book's royalties are donated to the Children in Crisis Fund portion of the International Board on Books for Young People."

== Plot summary ==
Amani is a young Palestinian girl. Her family have a long tradition of tending sheep above the olive groves of the family homestead in the valley near Hebron. Amani is inspired by the life and stories of Seedo, her grandfather and she dreams to follow in his footsteps. The parents of the young girl would like her to go to school in the village and learn to be a good Muslim and wife. Seedo, on the contrary, believes that Amani should learn to tend sheep and ensure that the family traditions are passed down. Amani is learning to be a good shepherd through Seedo's teaching. The old man also tells her stories about a secret meadow called Firdoos.

When Amani's home and pasture land are being threatened by the encroaching Jewish settlement, her family's land used to graze sheep is becoming threatened. As she pushes her way higher on the mountain she discovers what seems to be Firdoos, the mythical pasture of Seedo's story. There, she meets a boy named Jonathan, the son of a Jewish settler. The thought of her livelihood being destroyed by the settlers encourages Amani to go to school. There she can learn English, and perhaps be able to argue with the settlers. At school, she meets several girls who are faced with the same tragedy. Not only is Amani's home being destroyed but her family is also dispersed. Her mom, who went to Canada to visit her dying mother, finds herself incapable of returning to Palestine. Her father and uncle are imprisoned for opposing Israeli actions. With the surprising help of a rabbi, a woman lawyer and a Christian Peacemaker Team the family are able to reunite at last and rebuilt what has been destroyed.

== Main themes ==
The novel deals with the conflict between Palestinians and Israelis in a non-violence context. Another theme is the conflict between old and modern society and ways of living.

== Literary awards ==
Since being published in 2008, Anne Carter's novel has been honored in eight award programs including the Canadian Library Association Book of the Year for Children Award, the Society of School Librarians International Best Book Award and Jane Addams Children's Book Award Honor Book.

== Characters in order of appearance ==
Amani: Palestinian girl. Her name means "Wish" but she is nicknamed "the sheep girl". Amani is the protagonist of the story.

Seedo: Amani's grandfather, the shepherd.

Mama (Rose): Amani's mother

Sitti: Amani's grandmother

Nasty: The ram

Omar: Amani's 10-year-old brother

Amma Fatima: Ammo Hani's wife, Amani's aunt

Wardeh: Amani's older cousin, the oldest of a family of five girls

Ammo Hani: Seedo's oldest son. He becomes a prisoner of the Settlers

Aref: Amani's cousin, he teaches Amani how to read and write in the evening so she can shepherd during the day

Nahla: Amani's cousin who married Al Khalil

Miss Aboushi: School teacher

The vet : Gives advice to Amani on how to care for the sheep

Romania: a sheep given to Amani by the vet. She is of a rare breed

Mudher: Seedo's only living brother who comes to help during olive-harvesting

Black face: Romania's lamb

Sahem: The family dog

Musical Sitti: Amani's grandmother on her mother's side. She lives in Toronto and is dying of cancer so Rose travels see her.

The Rabbi: A friend of Baba's from Jerusalem. He helps the family in their attempt to negotiate with the settlers who are building a highway on their land.

Raja: A friend of Wardeh from school

Jonathan ("The boy"): A Jewish boy from New York, he came to Palestine to visit his father who is working on the settler highway.

Souad, Alia, Dana and Hania: Amani's schoolmates who are also affected by the construction of the highway

Islan: Amani's uncle who lives in the village

Lawyer: Woman from Tel Aviv who works on Human Rights issues.

Abu Nader: Shepherd and friend of Seedo

== The author ==
Anne Laurel Carter was born and raised in Don Mills, Ontario. She started traveling when she was seventeen years old. Her adventures took her to Scotland and Israel where she studied Hebrew. She met her first husband, an American man on Kibbutz. They moved to Los Angeles and were married. Anne Laurel then decided to get education to work with children. She has a master's degree in Education and taught immigrants in Toronto who shared their stories and later inspired her. The experience was an eye opener for the author-to-be. Anne Laurel Carter, also taught in remote communities in Canada and enjoyed the experience. She did not consider becoming a writer until she became a mother with her second husband. Her four young children triggered her imagination and put her on the writer's path.

== Critique ==
Despite its success, the novel generated controversy among the Jewish advocacy group B'nai B'rith whose advocate, in a letter to the Ontario provincial ministry of education and the Toronto Board of Education, requested that the book be removed from the recommended-reading list arguing that it is 'anti-Israeli propaganda'. The book is not part of the Toronto School Board curriculum but is recommended by the Ontario Library Association.

== Awards and nominations ==
2010 Red Maple Award Nominee

2009 CLA Book of the Year Award for Children

2009 Honor Book for the Jane Addams Book Award for peace

2009 IRA Notable Book for a Global Society

2009 USBBY Outstanding International Book

== Other works by Anne Laurel Carter ==
Anne Laurel Carter has published a series of picture books, young adult books and adult books.

Her young adult books include The Shepherd's Grand-Daughter (Groundwood, 2008), Last Chance Bay (Penguin, 2004), In the Clear (Orca, 2001), the trilogy Our Canadian Girl (Penguin, 2002-2005-2006) and No Missing Parts Short: Stories About Real Princesses (Red Deer Press, Fall 2002).
