= Song Nan Zhang =

Song Nan Zhang is a Canadian-Chinese artist, illustrator and author of children's books. (Zhang is his family name)

== Education ==
Zhang was born in Shanghai in 1942. He has undergraduate (1964) and postgraduate degrees (1980) from the Central Institute of Fine Arts (Beijing), and attended the École des Beaux-Arts in Paris (1984–85).

== Career ==
After graduating from the Central Institute of Fine Arts, Zhang became a staff member there: art professor (1980–88), deputy director (1985–87), and dean of the mural department (1985–88). Zhang moved to Canada in 1988.

Zhang's paintings have been exhibited at the Montreal Museum of Fine Arts; throughout China; Hong Kong; Tokyo; Paris; and Seoul.

== Awards and honors ==
- 1993 - Mr. Christie's Book Awards - for A Little Tiger in the Chinese Night: An Autobiography in Art
- 1994 - Children's Literature Roundtables of Canada honor book - for A Little Tiger in the Chinese Night: An Autobiography in Art
- 1997 - Red Cedar Book Award - for The Children of China: An Artist's Journey

== Publications ==
As author-illustrator

- 1993 - A Little Tiger in the Chinese Night: An Autobiography in Art, Tundra Books (Plattsburgh, NY)
- 1994 - Five Heavenly Emperors: Chinese Myths of Creation, Tundra Books (Plattsburgh, NY)
- 1995 - The Children of China: An Artist's Journey, Tundra Books (Plattsburgh, NY)
- 1997 - Cowboy on the Steppes, Tundra Books (Plattsburgh, NY)
- 1998 - The Ballad of Mulan, Pan Asian Publications (Union City, CA) - retelling old story
- 2000 - (With son, Hao Yu Zhang) A Time of Golden Dragons, Tundra Books (Plattsburgh, NY)
- 2005 - (With Hou Yu Zhang) The Great Voyages of Zheng He, Pan Asian Publications (Union City, CA)

Works by Zhang have been translated into Spanish, Vietnamese, and Chinese.

As illustrator

- 1998 - Linda Granfield, reteller, The Legend of the Panda, Tundra Books (Plattsburgh, NY)
- 1999 - The Man Who Made Parks: The Story of Parkbuilder Frederick Law Olmsted, Tundra Books (Plattsburgh, NY)
- 2000 - Jo Bannatyne-Cugnet, From Far and Wide: A Canadian Citizenship Scrapbook, Tundra Books (Plattsburgh, NY)
- 2001 - Aaron Shepard, reteller, Lady White Snake: A Tale from Chinese Opera, Pan Asian Publications (Union City, CA)
- 2003 - Deborah Hodge, Emma's Story, Tundra Books (Plattsburgh, NY)
- 2004 - Arlene Chan, Awakening the Dragon, Tundra Books (Plattsburgh, NY)
