= Virginie Egger =

Canadian artist and illustrator (b. 1966)

Virginie Egger (born 1966) is a Swiss-born Canadian artist and illustrator living in Quebec.

Egger was born in Geneva and received a diploma from the ’École des arts décoratifs (later the Centre de Formation Professionnelle Arts Genève) there. She moved to Quebec in 1988. After working for eight years on animated films, she began working as an illustrator for magazines and youth literature.

Egger directed the National Film Board of Canada animated film Un pas, which was presented at the World Festival of Animated Film Zagreb.

Egger's first picture book Recette d’éléphant à la sauce vieux pneu (text by Carole Tremblay) received the Governor General's Award for French-language children's illustration. Her illustrations for the book were also shown at the Biennial of Illustration Bratislava. She also received the Grand Prix Grafika in the categories editorial illustration and children's books.

== Selected works ==
- Débile toi-même!et autres poèmes tordus (2007) text by François Gravel, was a finalist for the Prix du livre jeunesse des bibliothèques de Montréal
- Le journal secret de Lulu Papino - Mon premier amour (2009) text by Lucie Papineau, nominated for a Governor General's Award for illustration
