= Ann Copeland =

American and Canadian writer (1932–2024)

- Born: Virginia Walsh; December 16, 1932; Hartford, Connecticut, U.S.
- Died: January 1, 2024 (aged 91)
- Occupation: Short story writer
- Writing career
- Period: 1970s–1990s
- Notable work: The Golden Thread

Virginia Walsh Furtwangler (December 16, 1932 – January 1, 2024), better known by the pen name Ann Copeland, was an American and Canadian writer. She was a shortlisted nominee for the Governor General's Award for English-language fiction at the 1989 Governor General's Awards for her short story collection The Golden Thread.

== Life and career ==
Born in Hartford, Connecticut on December 16, 1932, she was educated at the Catholic University of America and Cornell University. In 1968, she married Albert Furtwangler and moved to Sackville, New Brunswick, where Albert taught at Mount Allison University.

Copeland published five short story collections and an instructional guide to writing fiction.

She returned to the United States in 1996, and was later a professor emeritus at Willamette University in Salem, Oregon. Copeland died on January 1, 2024, at the age of 91.

== Selected works ==
- At Peace (1978)
- The Back Room (1979)
- Earthen Vessels (1984)
- The Golden Thread (1989)
- Strange Bodies on a Stranger Shore (1994)
- The ABCs of Writing Fiction (1996)
- Season of Apples (1996)

== Awards and honours ==
- Shortlisted nominee for the Governor General's Award for English-language fiction at the 1989 Governor General's Awards
