= Henriette Major =

Canadian writer (1933-2006)

Henriette Major (January 6, 1933 – November 17, 2006) was a Canadian writer living in Quebec.

She was born in Montreal and studied at the Institut pédagogique de Montréal. However, she soon discovered that she did not want to be a teacher. After becoming a mother, she began writing down stories that she told to her children so that she would remember them. She tried other occupations, including working as a researcher for radio and television, but finally decided to make a career of writing. Major wrote scripts for several television series, including La Boîte à surprise and L'Évangile en papier and two plays for Théâtre sans fil: Jeux de rêves and La couronne du destin. She published almost a thousand articles for various magazines, including Châtelaine and Maclean's, and about a hundred children's books in Quebec and France. In 1978, her television series Les boucaniers d'eau douce received the Prix des émissions éducatives. From 1976 to 1990, she was director for the Pour lire series for Les Éditions Héritage. Major also published several collections of songs: Chansons et rondes pour s'amuser, Chansons drôles, chansons folles, Chansons douces, chansons tendres and Le Tour du monde en chansons).

She died suddenly at home in Montreal at the age of 73.

The Prix littéraire Henriette-Major was created in her honour by the publishing house Dominique et Compagnie.

== Selected works ==
Sources:

- La surprise de dame Chenille (1970), received a prize from the Canadian Library Association in 1971
- Les contes de Nulle part et d’Ailleurs (1975)
- L'Évangile en papier (1978), received the Prix Alvine-Bélisle
- François d’Assise (1981), about Saint Francis of Assisi
- Marguerite Bourgeoys (1983)
- La machine à rêves (1984)
- Les devinettes d'Henriette (2004), received the Prix Québec-Wallonie-Bruxelles
- Jongleries (2006), illustrations by Philippe Béha
- La Sorcière et la Princesse
