= Janice Boddy =

Canadian anthropologist

Janice Boddy is a Canadian anthropologist. As Professor of Anthropology at the University of Toronto, Boddy specializes in medical anthropology, religion, gender issues, and colonialism in Sudan and the Middle East. She is the author or co-author of Wombs and Alien Spirits (1990), Aman: The Story of a Somali Girl (1995), and Civilizing Women: British Crusades in Colonial Sudan (2007).

In a paper "Womb as oasis: the symbolic context of Pharaonic circumcision in rural Northern Sudan" (American Ethnologist, 1982), Boddy argued for a cultural contextualization of female genital mutilation in Africa by those who wish to see the practice abandoned.

== Education ==
Boddy obtained her BA from McGill University, her MA from the University of Calgary and, in 1982, her PhD from the University of British Columbia.

== Awards ==
Boddy is believed to be the first women from the University of Toronto Scarborough to be selected to the Royal Society of Canada. The second woman, Lisa Jeffrey, was elected in 2007.
