= Joceline Sanschagrin =

Canadian writer living in Quebec (born 1950)

Joceline Sanschagrin (born September 2, 1950) is a Canadian writer living in Quebec.

She was born in Montreal and studied French literature at the Collège Sainte-Marie de Montréal and the Cégep du Vieux Montréal. She went on to earn a bachelor's degree in communications from the Université du Québec à Montréal. Sanschagrin has worked as a freelance journalist, researcher and columnist for Le Journal de Montréal, La Presse, Radio-Québec, Radio-Canada, Télévision Quatre Saisons and Télé-Métropole. For 7 years, she was a daily contributor to the Radio-Canada youth program 275-Allô.

Sanschagrin wrote the text for several books featuring the character Caillou; Caillou, le petit pot and Caillou, la petite soeur, both published in 1993, received a Mr. Christie's Book Award in 1994. Some of her books have been translated into English, Korean, Spanish, Greek, Icelandic, Polish and Chinese.

== Selected works ==
- La fille aux cheveux rouges (1989), was a finalist for the Mr. Christie's Book Awards and for the Governor General's Literary Awards
- La marque du dragon (1999), was a finalist for the Mr. Christie's Book Awards
