= Holiday House =

American children's book publisher

- Parent company: Trustbridge Global Media
- Founded: 1935; 91 years ago
- Country of origin: United States
- Headquarters location: New York City
- Distribution: Penguin Random House Publisher Services
- Publication types: Books
- Fiction genres: Children's books
- Imprints: Neal Porter Books; Margaret Ferguson Books; Pixel+Ink
- Official website: holidayhouse.com

Holiday House, Inc., is a publishing house founded in 1935 in New York City, specializing in children's literature. It is a member of the Children's Book Council. The logo of the Holiday House little boy is by E. H. Shepard from the publisher's original edition of The Reluctant Dragon by Kenneth Grahame.

Notable authors include Yuyi Morales, Polly Horvath, Gail Gibbons, and David A. Adler. The house publishes 120 titles a year. These titles include a number of translations from other languages, such as The Postman from Space, by Guillaume Perreault.

Holiday House's books have been the recipient of awards, including the Caldecott Medal and the Newbery.

Holiday House was acquired by the investment firm Trustbridge Partners in 2016 and is part of Trustbridge Global Media.

In 2020, Trustbridge launched the sister imprint Pixel+Ink.
