= GreenSource Magazine =

American trade magazine

GreenSource Magazine was a bimonthly trade magazine published by McGraw-Hill Construction in New York City which focused on sustainable design. The magazine was printed on 100 percent post-consumer recycled stock with soy ink.

== History and profile ==
GreenSource Magazine was launched in June 2006 as the sister publication of Architectural Record and the member publication of the United States Green Building Council (USGBC). Aimed at the green-design community, it featured articles on projects, design processes, technology, products, and environmental issues in the developing sustainable building industry as well as case studies with technical information, weather charts, plans, illustrations, key project energy performance data, and green products used. GreenSource Magazine ceased publication following the November/December 2013 issue.

The official homepage supported the print publication with social media and community tools as well as daily news, blogs, forums, a video library, and user-generated photo galleries. Monthly featured include "Best Green Houses", "LEED-Platinum Portfolio", and "Solution of the Month". The site also featured a searchable database of all studies published in the magazine.

== Awards ==
The magazine won a number of awards, including the American Business Media “Best Single Issue” Jesse H. Neal 2010 Award for the March/April 2009 issue, the 2011 Ozzie Gold for Best B to B Redesign, the American Business Media "Best Integrated Package" Jesse H. Neal 2011 Award for the November/December "Greenbuild Chicago: Transforming the Metropolis" series, and a Society of Publication Designers Silver Medal for the “Digging for Dollars” illustration from the September/October 2010 issue.

Additionally, Jane Kolleeny, managing editor of GreenSource Magazine, was named 2011 McAllister Editorial Fellow.

== See also ==
- Green building
- Sustainable design
