= Anne Laurel Carter =

Canadian writer

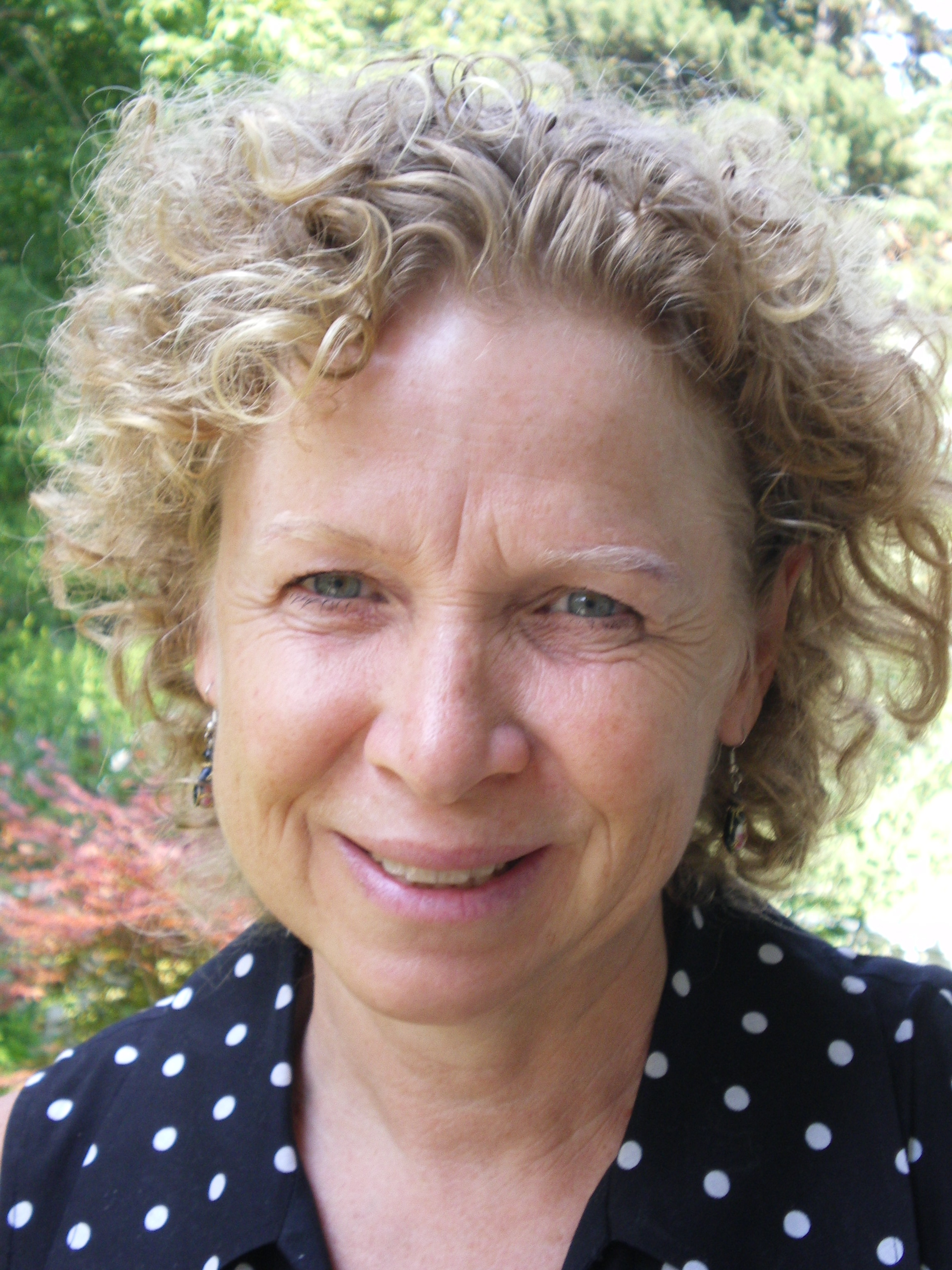
- Carter in 2007
- Born: September 22, 1953 (age 73); Don Mills, Ontario, Canada
- Writing career
- Genres: children's literature, young adult literature
- Website: annelaurelcarter.com

Anne Laurel Carter (born September 22, 1953) is a Canadian author with eighteen published books, mostly for young adults and children.

== Life ==
Born in Don Mills, the youngest of four children, she began a science program at the University of Toronto, intending to study medicine, but left the program in her second year. At the age of 19, she went to Israel where she studied Hebrew, staying for a year and a half during the Yom Kippur War. She met her first husband in Israel; they moved to California and were married. The couple then moved to Toronto, where Carter earned a BA from York University and a BEd from the University of Toronto. She took part in a French immersion program, staying in Trois Pistoles, Saint Pierre and Miquelon, Rivière-du-Loup, Chicoutimi and Grenoble (France). Carter then taught English as a second language at Eastmain, Mistissini and Chisasibi in northern Quebec. In 1984, she completed a MEd in second language learning at the Ontario Institute for Studies in Education. She began teaching in Peterborough. After reconnecting with a male friend from Toronto there, she moved to Bramalea, a neighbourhood of Brampton, Ontario, where she taught school, married and had four children.

Carter began submitting stories for publication. In 1997, her story "No Missing Parts" won second prize in a contest sponsored by the Toronto Star. Her next story "Leaving the Iron Lung" won second prize in the same competition i the following year. A revised version of the story was published and received the Vicky Metcalf Short Story Award. In 1999, she published her first book Tall in the Saddle.

Carter teaches children's book courses privately and also at the University of Toronto School of Continuing Studies.

== Criticism ==
Carter's 2008 book The Shepherd's Granddaughter, about a Palestinian farm girl, has received the Canadian Library Association Book of the Year for Children Award, the Society of School Librarians Best International Book Award, the IRA Notable Book for a Global Society and the Jane Addams Honor Award for peace. It also sparked controversy; it was labelled as "anti-Israel" by B'nai B'rith, who asked that the book be removed from Ontario's recommended reading lists for schools. Groundwood Books publisher Patsy Aldana praised the book, releasing a statement arguing that "No less a figure than James Loney, who was held hostage in Iraq by extremists and who works for Christian Peacemaker Teams, has praised the book for its balance."

== Selected works ==
Her works include:

- From Poppa, children's fiction (1999)
- The Girl on Evangeline Beach, young adult fiction (2000)
- In the Clear, young adult fiction (2001), finalist for the 2002 Ontario Library Association Silver Birch Award Program.
- Under a Prairie Sky, children's fiction (2002), received the Mr. Christie's Book Award
- No Missing Parts And Other Stories About Real Princesses, stories (2002)
- Circus Play, children's fiction (2002)
- Elizabeth: Bless This House, young adult fiction (2002)
- The F Team, children's fiction (2003)
- Last Chance Bay, children's fiction (2004), received the Canadian Library Association Book of the Year for Children Award
- My Wedding Dress, novel (2007)
- Out of the Deeps, children's fiction (2008)
- Night Boy, children's fiction (2012)
