= Stéphane Jorisch =

Canadian artist

Stéphane Jorisch is a Canadian artist and illustrator. He is a two-time winner of the Governor General's Award for French-language children's illustration, winning in 1993 for Le Monde selon Jean de ... and in 1999 for Charlotte et l'île du destin, and a two-time winner of the Governor General's Award for English-language children's illustration, in 2004 for Jabberwocky and in 2008 for The Owl and the Pussycat.

In 2008 he was also cowinner with Gilles Vigneault of the TD Canadian Children's Literature Award in the French division, for Un cadeau pour Sophie.

His daughter Édith Jorisch is a filmmaker. Her documentary film The Heir (L'héritier), about her grandfather's quest to reclaim art lost by the family to the Nazis during World War II, won a Prix Gémeaux in 2017 and the Michael Moskovitz Award for a Film in 2018.
