= Katia Canciani =

Canadian writer (born 1971)

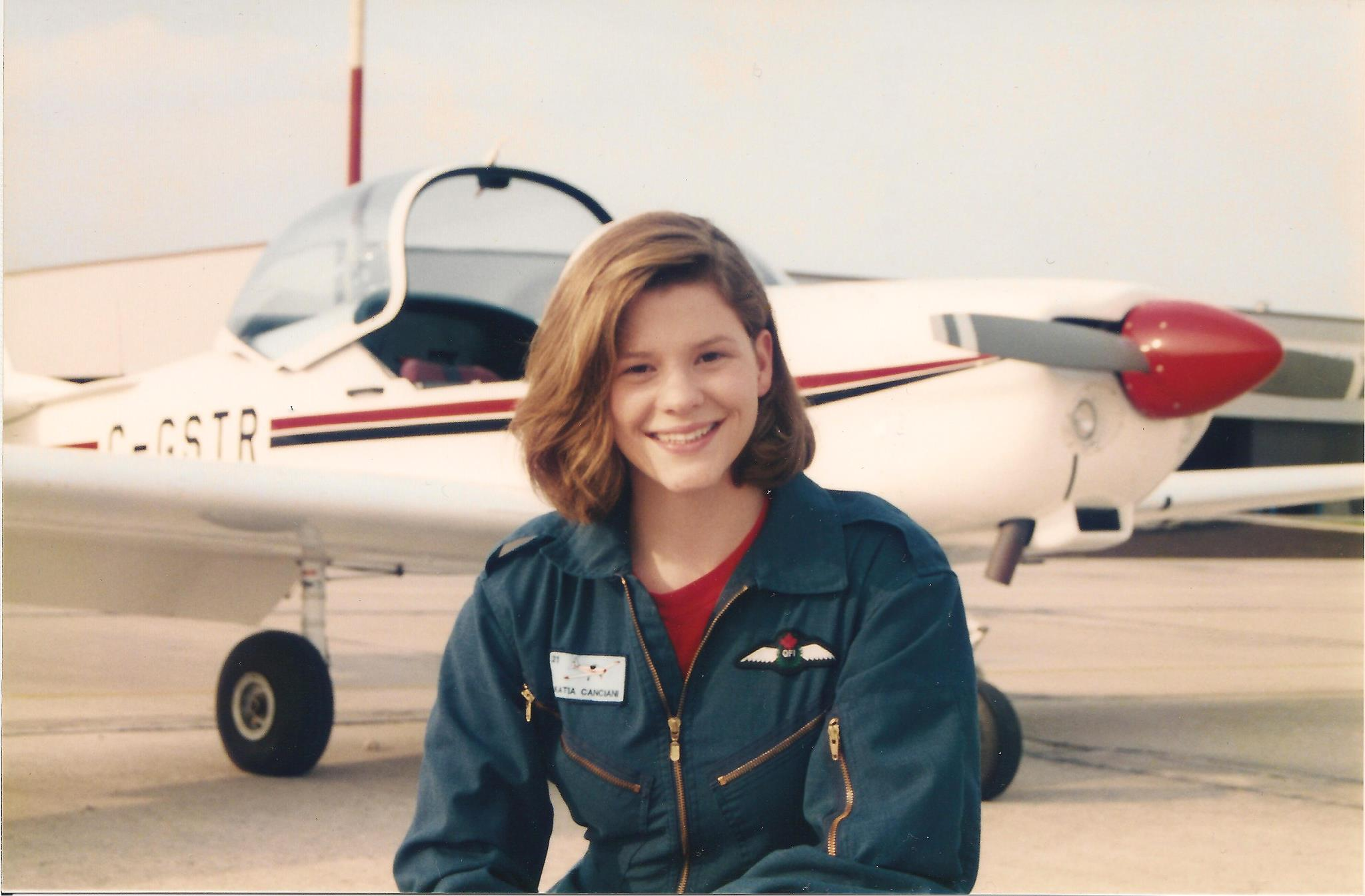
- Canciani at Canadian Aviation Training Centre; Southport, Manitoba (1994)
- Born: February 16, 1971 (age 55); Blainville, Quebec
- Education: Université TÉLUQ (B.A.); Cégep de Chicoutimi; Nav Canada (FSS)
- Occupations: Writer, aviator
- Employer: Transport Canada
- Notable work: Pet et Répète
- Children: 3
- Awards: Governor General’s Literary Award
- Website: katiacanciani.com

Katia Canciani (born February 16, 1971) is a Canadian writer and aviator originally from Blainville, Quebec. She was awarded the Governor General's Award for French-language children's illustration for the novel Pet et Répète: La véritable histoire at the 2020 Governor General's Awards.

== Biography ==
Katia Canciani was born in 1971 to a Breton mother who emigrated to Canada at the age of six, and to a Gascon father who went to Canada to visit Expo 67 in Montreal. She grew up in the city of Blainville, a suburb of Montreal, Quebec. She left home at 17 years old to pursue her studies at the Centre Québécois de Formation Aéronautique du Cégep de Chicoutimi where she obtained her professional pilot's license in 1991. She taught flight and aerobatics in Manitoba until 1995, then in Quebec in the summer of 1997.

Canciani lived in Ottawa, Ontario for several years and worked for Transport Canada’s Civil Aviation’s Contingency and Emergency Planning division. In 2019, she was elected Chair of the NATO Transport Group Civil Aviation (TGCA), for a three-year term. She currently resides in Brussels, Belgium.

== Works ==
Canciani has authored more than 47 novels and children's books. Her first novel, Un jardin en Espagne was published in 2006 and was a finalist for the Prix des lecteurs Radio-Canada. Her novel 178 secondes, was winner of the 2010 Prix littéraire des enseignants du Québec in the novel 15 years and over category. She has also published Lettre à Saint-Exupéry, an epistolary novel in which she recounts her journey as a writer, pilot, and mother.

=== Novels ===
- 2006 – Un jardin en Espagne. Retour au Généralife (David) ISBN 9782895972822
- 2009 – Lettre à Saint-Exupéry (Fides) ISBN 9782762130195
- 2015 – 178 secondes (David) ISBN 9782895974536

=== Children's books ===
- 2007 – Riquili apprend à compter (Bouton D’or Acadie) ISBN 9782923518183
- 2007 – Crinière au vent: Si j’avais un poney... (Hurtubise) ISBN 9782894289723
- 2007 – Samuel la tornade (Bayard) ISBN 9782895791478
- 2008 – Poussièra (Bayard) ISBN 9782895792185
- 2008 – Crinière au vent: Un camp mystère... (Hurtubise) ISBN 9782896471256
- 2008 – Kimmy la lune (Bayard) ISBN 9782895792208
- 2008 – Le château qui puait trop (Bouton D’or Acadie) ISBN 9782923518282
- 2008 – Riquili apprend les voyelles (Bouton D’or Acadie) ISBN 9782923518305
- 2009 – La princesse Pop Corn (Bayard) ISBN 9782895792451
- 2009 – Riquili apprend les consonnes (Bouton D’or Acadie) ISBN 9782923518534
- 2009 – Frédéric le méli-mêlé (Bayard) ISBN 9782895792369
- 2009 – La grande bataille (Bayard) ISBN 9782895798378
- 2010 – Crinière au vent: Poney en cavale (Hurtubise) ISBN 9782896473052
- 2010 – La bataille au sommet (Bayard) ISBN 9782895793090
- 2010 – Rosalie la ronde (Bayard) ISBN 9782895793021
- 2010 – Karim le kaki (Bayard) ISBN 9782895793281
- 2010 – Girofle déménage (ERPI) ISBN 9782761332316
- 2010 – Le secret des diamants (Bayard) ISBN 9782761332316
- 2011 – Les aventures de Sam Chicotte: Les baleines des Îles-de-la-Madeleine (Bayard) ISBN 9782895794059
- 2011 – Les aventures de Sam Chicotte: La potion du Grand Nord (Bayard) ISBN 9782895794066
- 2012 – Un écureuil coquin (ERPI) ISBN 9782761344173
- 2012 – La bataille d’oreillers (Bayard) ISBN 9782895794318
- 2012 – Léon la cible (Bayard) ISBN 9782895794479
- 2012 – Les aventures de Sam Chicotte: Les crapauds de Fort Lennox (Bayard) ISBN 9782895794455
- 2012 – Les aventures de Sam Chicotte: La lumière de New York (Bayard) ISBN 9782895794448
- 2012 – Les aventures de Sam Chicotte: Le talisman du Mexique (Bayard) ISBN 9782895794073
- 2012 – Les aventures de Sam Chicotte: Le trèfle d’Irlande (Bayard) ISBN 9782895794080
- 2013 – La bataille des plaines (Bayard) ISBN 9782895795148
- 2013 – Billy la bulle: Mon meilleur ami (Bayard) ISBN 9782895795438
- 2013 – Pilote en détresse (Magazine "J'aime lire" en France)
- 2014 – L’envolée d’Antoine (l’Isatis) ISBN 9782924309070
- 2014 – Le Dromadaire au nez rouge (Soulières) ISBN 9782896072736
- 2015 – Le voyage en Chine (Bayard) ISBN 9782895796374
- 2015 – Courage, Dafné! (Ma Bulle) ISBN 9782924472057
- 2015 – Mirmaëlle, fée des dents: Une mission sans peur (Bayard) ISBN 9782895796770
- 2015 – Pique la lune (l’Isatis) ISBN 9782924309483
- 2016 – Mirmaëlle, fée des dents: Un Noël surprenant (Bayard) ISBN 9782897700423
- 2017 – Théo, apprenti détective (Bayard) ISBN 9782897700706
- 2018 – L’attaque du Voletor (Magazine "J'aime lire" en France)
- 2018 – L’attaque du Griffetor (Bayard) ISBN 9782897701222
- 2019 – Le multiplicator de Pâques (Bayard) ISBN 9782897702281
- 2019 – La cabane (Bouton d'or Acadie) ISBN 9782897501471
- 2019 – Pet et Répète: La véritable histoire (Fonfon) ISBN 9782924984123
- 2019 – Sonia d’Or, 1. Si j’avais un poney… (Hachette) ISBN 9782017079262
- 2019 – Sofia et le marchand ambulant (Les 400 coups) ISBN 9782895407775
- 2019 – Édouard, chausseurs de monstres: Le multiplicator de Pâques (Bayard) ISBN 9782897702281
- 2020 – Sonia d'Or, 2. Un camp mystère (Hachette) ISBN 9782017164333
- 2020 – The Ice Shack (Breakwater Books) ISBN 9781550818505

== Awards and honours ==
Pet et Répète: La véritable histoire, illustrated by Guillaume Perreault, Fonfon (2019)

- Prix littéraire Mélèze in 2021
- Governor General's Award for French-language children's illustration, laureate in 2020

Sofia et le marchand ambulant, illustrated by Antoine Desprez, Les 400 coups (2019)

- Prix Saint-Exupéry – Volet Jeunesse – Francoponie, recipient in 2020
- Prix littéraire Chronos, finalist in 2021
- Prix littéraire Peuplier, finalist in 2021
- Prix littéraire Tatoulu, finalist in 2021

Théo, apprenti détective, illustrated by Jean Morin, Bayard (2017)

- Prix littéraire Tamarac Express - Forêt de la lecture, finalist in 2018

Pique la lune, illustrations de Félix Girard, l’Isatis (2015)

- Prix littéraire Tamarac Express - Forêt de la lecture, finalist in 2017

Le voyage en Chine illustrated by Félix Girard, l’Isatis (2015)

- Prix littéraire Tamarac Express - Forêt de la lecture, finalist in 2016

Samuel la tornade, illustrated by Christine Battuz, Bayard (2007)

- Prix Communication et société, catégorie jeunesse in 2009

Poussièra, illustrated by Julie Cossette, Bayard (2008)

- Prix littéraire France-Acadie, finalist in 2009
