= Ian Wallace (illustrator) =

Canadian illustrator and writer (born 1950)

Ian Wallace (born 1950) is a Canadian illustrator and writer. He was born in Niagara Falls, Ontario.

Wallace attended the Ontario College of Art.

== Works ==
As writer and illustrator

- The Sleeping Porch (Groundwood Books, Jul 2008)
- The Huron Carol (Groundwood, Aug 2006)
- The Man Who Walked the Earth (Groundwood, Aug 2003)
- The Naked Lady (Roaring Brook, Oct 2002)
- The True Story of Trapper Jack's Left Big Toe (Roaring Brook, Apr 2002)
- Duncan's Way (Dorling Kindersley, Mar 2000)
- Boy of the Deeps (Dorling Kindersley, Mar 1999)
- A Winter's Tale (Groundwood, Aug 1997)
- Mr. Kneebone's New Digs (Douglas & McIntyre, Feb 1991)
- Morgan the Magnificent (Margaret K. McElderry, Jun 1987)
- Chin Chiang and the Dragon's Dance (Groundwood, Nov 1984)

As illustrator

- Sarah and the People of Sand River, by W. D. Valgardson (Groundwood, Aug 1996)
- Hansel and Gretel, (Groundwood, Mar 1996), from the Brothers Grimm tale "Hansel and Gretel" [1812]
- The Mummer's Song, by Bud Davidge (1993)
- The Name of the Tree: A Bantu Tale Retold, by Celia Barker Lottridge (1989)
- Architect of the Moon, by Tim Wynne-Jones (Groundwood, 1988)
- Very Last First Time, by Jan Andrews (1985)
- The Sandwich, with Angela Wood (Kids Can, 1975)
- Canadian Railroad Trilogy, by Gordon Lightfoot (1967)
