= Christiane Duchesne =

Quebec researcher, educator, illustrator, translator and writer

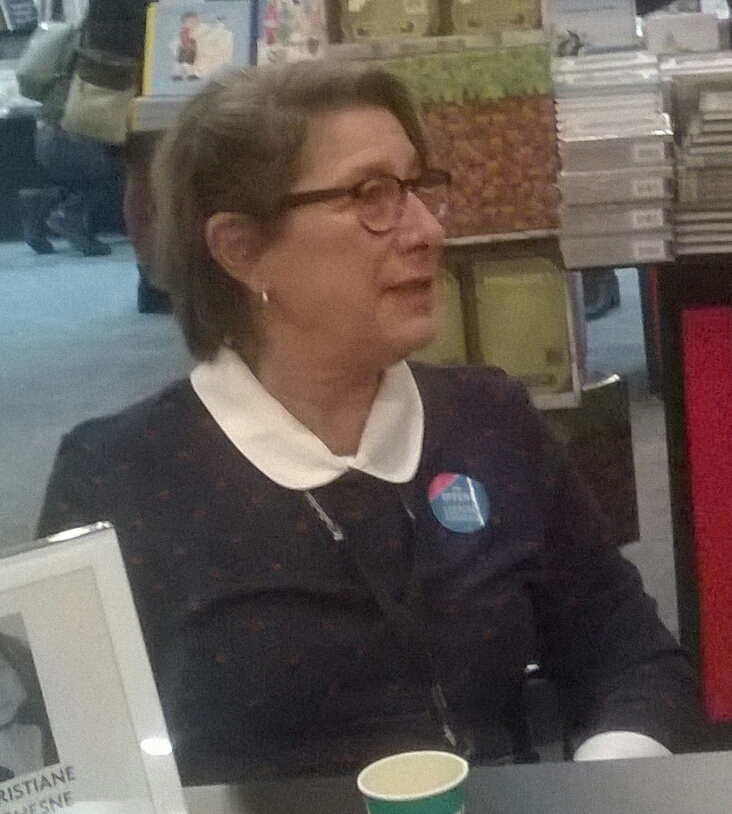
- Christiane Duchesne (2018)
- Born: August 12, 1949 (age 77); Montreal, Quebec
- Education: Collège Jean-de-Brébeuf; Université de Montréal
- Occupations: Researcher, educator, illustrator, translator and writer

Christiane Duchesne (born August 12, 1949) is a Quebec researcher, educator, illustrator, translator and writer.

== Biography ==
She was born in Montreal and was educated at the Collège Jésus-Marie d'Outremont, at the Collège Jean-de-Brébeuf and at the Université de Montréal where she studied industrial design. From 1990 to 1993, she was a researcher for several audio-visual production companies. She also was editor in chief for the magazine Décormag, an associate editor for the Courte Échelle publishing company and director of the Kid Quid collection of the Québec Amérique publishing house. Duchesne has served on the board of directors for the Salon du livre de Montréal.

She wrote a number of scripts for Radio Canada, including an adaptation of Alice au pays des merveilles which received the Slovak Prix Court Métrage in 1998. In 1996, Duchesne was one of the finalists for the International Board on Books for Young People's Hans Christian Andersen Award for her body of work.

== Selected works ==
- La Vraie histoire du chien de Clara Vic, youth novel (1990), received the Governor General's Award for French-language children's literature and the Prix Alvine-Bélisle
- Bibitsa, ou, L'étrange voyage de Clara Vic, youth novel (1991), received the Mr. Christie's Book Award and the Prix d'excellence des Consommateurs
- Victor, youth novel (1992), received the Governor General's Award for French-language children's literature
- La 42e soeur de Bébert, youth novel (1993), received the Mr. Christie's Book Award
- La bergère de chevaux, youth novel (1995), received the Mr. Christie's Book Award and the Prix Québec/Wallonie-Bruxelles
- L'homme des silences, novel (1999), received the Prix France-Québec and the Prix Ringuet from the Académie des lettres du Québec; it was also nominated for the Governor General's Award for French-language fiction
- Jomusch et le troll des cuisines, youth novel (2001), received the Governor General's Award for French-language children's literature
- La vengeance d'Adeline Parot (2009), received the Prix Alvine-Bélisle
