= Stéphane Poulin =

Canadian children's book author and illustrator

- Born: 1961 (age 64–65); Montreal, Quebec
- Education: Collège Ahuntsic
- Occupations: Author and illustrator
- Writing career
- Genre: Children's book
- Notable awards: Governor General's Award for French-language children's illustration (1986); Vicky Metcalf Award for Literature for Young People (1989); Prix Québec-Wallonie-Bruxelles de littérature de jeunesse (1990)

Stéphane Poulin (born 1961) is a Canadian children's book author and illustrator living in Quebec.

He was born in Montreal, Quebec, and studied graphic arts at Collège Ahuntsic. In 1983, Poulin received honourable mention as children's book illustrator in a competition held by Communication-Jeunesse. The following year, he was awarded "Best in Show." In 1985, he published his first book ah belle cité!/a beautiful city: abc; the paintings used to illustrate the book were shown at the Galerie l'Art Français in Montreal. His 1986 books Album de famille and As-tu vu Joséphine? received the Canada Council Children's Literature Prize for illustration. Album de famille also received the Prix Québec-Wallonie-Bruxelles de littérature de jeunesse. In 1989, he received the Vicky Metcalf Award for Literature for Young People.

== Selected works ==
- Peux-tu attraper Joséphine? (1986), won an award in a literary contest run by the Boston Globe; translated as Can You Catch Josephine?, won the Elizabeth Mrazik-Cleaver Canadian Picture Book Award and was named to the International Board on Books for Young People (IBBY) honour list
- Benjamin et la saga des oreillers (1989), received the Canada Council Children's Literature Prize for illustration
- Un voyage pour deux (1991), received a Mr. Christie's Book Award for illustration and was also named to the IBBY honour list
- Poil de serpent, dent d'araignée (1996), received a Mr. Christie's Book Award for illustration
- Petit zizi (1997), received the Prix illustrations jeunesse GLV
- Vieux Thomas et la petite fée (2000), received a Mr. Christie's Book Award for text and illustration and also received the Prix illustrations jeunesse GLV
- Un chant de Noël (2003), received the Elizabeth Mrazik-Cleaver Canadian Picture Book Award
