= Philippe Béha =

French Canadian children's book writer and illustrator

- Born: 1950 (age 75–76)
- Occupations: Writer and illustrator
- Writing career
- Genre: Children's books

Philippe Béha (born 1950) is a French Canadian children's book writer and illustrator living in Quebec.

He was born in Casablanca to french parents, studied at the École supérieure des arts décoratifs de Strasbourg and came to Quebec in 1976. He worked as a freelance visual designer for Radio-Canada before becoming a full-time illustrator. Béha has illustrated more than 180 children's books. In 1982, he was awarded the Prix Communication-Jeunesse for best illustration in the professional illustrator category. He was a finalist for the Prix du livre jeunesse des Bibliothèques de Montréal in 2009, 2010 and 2012.

== Selected works ==
- Seul au monde (1982) text by Robert Soulières, received the Prix d’excellence from Graphisme Québec
- Le Voyage à la recherche du temps (1982) text by Lucie Ledoux, received the Prix Alvine-Bélisle
- Pipi dans le pot; Mes cheveux; J’aime Claire; Dors, petit ours (1983), text by Sylvie Assathiany and Louise Pelletier, received the Prix Alvine-Bélisle
- Grand-maman; Mon bébé-sœur; Où est ma tétine ?; Quand ça va mal (1983), text by Sylvie Assathiany and Louise Pelletier, received the Canada Council Children's Literature Prize for illustration
- Les Jeux de Pic-Mots (1988), received the Canada Council Children's Literature Prize for illustration
- Mais que font les fées avec toutes ces dents ? (1989), text by Michel Luppens, received a Mr. Christie's Book Award
- J'aime les poèmes )2003), text by Henriette Major, received the Prix illustrations jeunesse GLV
- Pas si bête (2005), received the Prix du livre jeunesse des bibliothèques de Montréal
