= List of Canadian playwrights =

Playwrights from Canada include:

== A ==
- Marianne Ackerman
- Kawa Ada
- Evan Adams
- Hoda Adra
- Carmen Aguirre
- André Alexis
- Hrant Alianak
- Martha Allan
- Anne-Marie Alonzo
- Karim Alrawi
- Kanika Ambrose
- Janet Amos
- Debra Anderson
- Hugh Abercrombie Anderson
- John Murray Anderson
- Ben Antao
- Trey Anthony
- Salvatore Antonio
- Leslie Arden
- Anthony Armstrong
- Daniel Arnold
- Lawrence Aronovitch
- Nina Arsenault
- Damien Atkins
- Napoléon Aubin
- Suzanne Aubry
- Barry Avrich
- Makram Ayache
- Caroline Azar

== B ==
- Maxine Bailey
- Catherine Banks
- Keith Barker
- Jean Basile
- Mary Elizabeth Bayer
- Tara Beagan
- Christine Beaulieu
- Victor-Lévy Beaulieu
- Charles William Bell
- Martin Bellemare
- John Bemrose
- Carolyn Bennett
- Janette Bertrand
- Lillian Beynon Thomas
- Yvan Bienvenue
- Geneviève Billette
- Nicolas Billon
- Marthe Blackburn
- Mark Blagrave
- Marie-Claire Blais
- William Rufus Blake
- Seymour Blicker
- Laurie Block
- Peter Blue Cloud
- Columpa Bobb
- Adam Bock
- Carol Bolt
- Louise Bombardier
- Yolanda Bonnell
- Walter Borden
- Gary Botting
- Michel Marc Bouchard
- Denise Boucher
- Pan Bouyoucas
- Gail Bowen
- Leah-Simone Bowen
- Douglas Bowie
- George Boyd
- Diana Braithwaite
- Ken Brand
- Marie Brassard
- Morwyn Brebner
- Baba Brinkman
- Fanny Britt
- Cecil Broadhurst
- Leanna Brodie
- Eve Brodlique
- Daniel Brooks
- Kenneth Brown
- Mark Brownell
- Walter Bruno
- Ronnie Burkett
- Aaron Bushkowsky
- Alec Butler

== C ==
- Chantal Cadieux
- Jason Cadieux
- Morley Callaghan
- George Frederick Cameron
- Silver Donald Cameron
- Normand Canac-Marquis
- Cliff Cardinal
- Dave Carley
- Franco Catanzariti
- Kate Cayley
- Catherine Chabot
- Rick Chafe
- Robert Chafe
- Anna Chatterton
- Normand Chaurette
- Martha Chaves
- Shirley Cheechoo
- Évelyne de la Chenelière
- Leah Cherniak
- Charly Chiarelli
- Herménégilde Chiasson
- Mary-Colin Chisholm
- Anne Chislett
- Ins Choi
- Olivier Choinière
- Sally Clark
- Cheril N. Clarke
- George Elliott Clarke
- Marie Clements
- Fabien Cloutier
- George Clutesi
- Lisa Codrington
- Joy Coghill
- Susan G. Cole
- Megan Gail Coles
- Kathryn Colquhoun
- Germaine Comeau
- Tom Cone
- Darla Contois
- Christopher Cook
- Michael Cook
- Beverley Cooper
- Charlotte Corbeil-Coleman
- Amanda Cordner
- Belinda Cornish
- Michel Côté
- Louise Cotnoir
- John Coulter
- Douglas Coupland
- Gracia Couturier
- Susan Coyne
- Archie Crail (Exile)
- Mark Crawford
- Caleigh Crow
- Seán Cummings
- Peter Cureton
- Colleen Curran
- Sheldon Currie
- Sarah Anne Curzon
- Eliza Lanesford Cushing
- May Cutler
- René Richard Cyr

== D ==
- Jean-Marc Dalpé
- Joseph A. Dandurand
- Daniel Danis
- Jill Daum
- Robertson Davies
- TJ Dawe
- Tracy Dawson
- Claire Dé
- Mazo de la Roche
- Vincent de Tourdonnet
- James DeFelice
- Jeanne-Mance Delisle
- David Demchuk
- Sandra Dempsey
- Merrill Denison
- Charles Dennis
- Denise Desautels
- Peter Desbarats
- Aurore Dessureault-Descôteaux
- Claudia Dey
- David Di Giovanni
- Ned Dickens
- Dick Diespecker
- Dorothy Dittrich
- Sean Dixon
- Emma Donoghue
- Catherine Dorion
- Chris Doty
- Clive Doucet
- Nathalie Doummar
- Bruce Dowbiggin
- Brian Drader
- Claire Drainie Taylor
- Don Druick
- Jasmine Dubé
- Marcel Dubé
- René-Daniel Dubois
- Réjean Ducharme
- Paul Dunn
- Louise Dupré
- Louisette Dussault
- Ted Dykstra

== E ==
- Chris Earle (Radio :30)
- Gwaai Edenshaw
- Mary Susanne Edgar
- Matthew Edison
- Caterina Edwards
- Tom Edwards
- Kris Elgstrand
- Cathy Elliott
- Richard Epp
- Josh Epstein
- Rose-Maïté Erkoreka
- Gloria Escomel
- Izad Etemadi
- Gérard Étienne
- Hubert Evans

== F ==
- Abla Farhoud
- David Fennario (Balconville, Joe Beef)
- Ian Ferguson
- Trevor Ferguson
- Timothy Findley (Elizabeth Rex, The Stillborn Lover)
- Lois Fine
- Larry Fineberg
- Thom Fitzgerald (Cloudburst)
- Diane Flacks
- Waawaate Fobister (Agokwe)
- Cheryl Foggo
- Dennis Foon (The Short Tree and the Bird That Could Not Sing)
- Honor Ford-Smith
- Norm Foster (Sinners, The Affections of May)
- Brian Francis (Box 4901)
- Brad Fraser (Unidentified Human Remains and the True Nature of Love, Poor Super Man)
- Carole Fréchette
- Louis-Honoré Fréchette
- Pauline Fréchette
- David French (Leaving Home, Salt-Water Moon)
- William Fruet
- Robin Fulford (Steel Kiss, Whitewash)
- Janine Fuller

== G ==
- Linda Gaboriau
- Lorena Gale
- Brendan Gall
- Mavis Gallant
- Steve Galluccio
- Ken Garnhum
- Bill Gaston
- C. E. Gatchalian
- Jean-Rock Gaudreault
- Connie Gault
- Gratien Gélinas
- Jean-Claude Germain
- Samuel Gesser
- Melissa James Gibson
- Florence Gibson MacDonald
- Sky Gilbert
- Joanna Glass
- François Godin
- Mathieu Gosselin
- Alexandre Goyette
- Gwethalyn Graham
- Rachel Graton
- Robert Gravel
- Carolyn Gray
- John MacLachlan Gray
- Jeff Green
- Nick Green
- Richard Greenblatt
- Brit Griffin
- Linda Griffiths
- Larry Guno
- David Gurr
- Paul Gury

== H ==
- Alexandria Haber
- Emma Haché
- Brigitte Haentjens
- Abby Hagyard
- Medina Hahn
- Jason Hall
- Jordan Hall
- Marie-Lynn Hammond
- Don Hannah
- Herschel Hardin
- Allana Harkin
- Don Harron
- Kim Senklip Harvey
- Elliott Hayes
- Michael Healey
- Charles Heavysege
- Marie-Francine Hébert
- Terence Heffernan
- David Hein
- Matthew Heiti
- Tom Hendry
- Kate Hennig
- John Herbert
- Catherine Hernandez
- Kate Hewlett
- Tomson Highway
- Brian Hill
- John Stephen Hill (Steve Hill)
- Ernest Hillen
- Karen Hines
- Ho Ka Kei (Jeff Ho)
- Bryce Hodgson
- Susan Holbrook
- Arthur Holden
- Norah M. Holland
- Margaret Hollingsworth
- Michael Hollingsworth
- Hilda Mary Hooke
- Raymond Hull
- J. Timothy Hunt
- Maureen Hunter
- Joel Thomas Hynes

== I ==
- John Ibbitson
- Neamat Imam
- Anosh Irani
- Steve Ivings

== J ==
- Donald Jack
- Ted Johns
- Becky Johnson
- Scott Jones
- Terry Jordan
- Patricia Joudry

== K ==
- Hiro Kanagawa
- Margo Kane
- M. J. Kang
- Greg Kearney
- Jillian Keiley
- Adam Kelly
- M. T. Kelly
- Olivier Kemeid
- Kevin Kerr
- Paul Kimball
- Deborah Kimmett
- Gary Klang
- Robert Knuckle
- Andrew Kooman
- Greg Kramer
- John Krizanc
- Daniel Krolik
- Sunil Kuruvilla
- Andrew Kushnir

== L ==
- Marie Laberge
- Rosa Labordé
- Jonathan Lachlan-Stewart
- Robert Lalonde
- Ann Lambert
- Betty Lambert
- André Langevin
- Gilbert La Rocque
- Rina Lasnier
- Jesse LaVercombe
- Mishka Lavigne
- John Lazarus
- Marie-Christine Lê-Huu
- Walter Learning
- Suzanne Lebeau
- Paul Sun-Hyung Lee
- Catherine Léger
- Mark Leiren-Young
- Anne Legault
- Stewart Lemoine
- Suvendrini Lena
- Robert Lepage
- François Létourneau
- Léo Lévesque
- Raymond Lévesque
- Sharon Lewis
- Georgina Lightning
- Hillar Liitoja
- Wendy Lill
- James Long
- Françoise Loranger
- Kevin Loring
- Otto Lowy
- Kate Lynch

== M ==
- Greg MacArthur
- Andrew MacBean
- Ann-Marie MacDonald
- Bryden MacDonald
- Maggie MacDonald
- Lee MacDougall
- Matthew MacFadzean
- David Macfarlane
- Daniel MacIvor
- Cory Mack
- Isabel Mackay
- Matthew MacKenzie
- Michael Mackenzie
- Michael MacLennan
- Joan MacLeod
- Andrew Macphail
- Michèle Magny
- Gilles Maheu
- Louise Maheux-Forcier
- Antonine Maillet
- André Major
- Kevin Major
- Anita Majumdar
- Robert Majzels
- Ahdri Zhina Mandiela
- Stanley Mann
- Vera Manuel
- Barbara March
- Josephine Marchand
- Jovette Marchessault
- Robert Marinier
- Tanya Marquardt
- Alexis Martin
- Bob Martin
- Paul Nicholas Mason
- Stephen Massicotte
- Catherine Mavrikakis
- Maxim Mazumdar
- Tawiah M'carthy
- Drew McCreadie
- Kathleen McDonnell
- Peter McGehee
- Berend McKenzie
- Ian McLachlan
- Mike McLeod
- Rick McNair
- Mike McPhaden
- Maureen Medved
- Mary Melfi
- Michael Melski
- Billy Merasty
- Robert Merritt
- Claude Meunier
- Andrée A. Michaud
- Pauline Michel
- Marco Micone
- John Mighton
- Jean-Louis Millette
- Michael Mirolla
- Fawzia Mirza
- W. O. Mitchell
- Boonaa Mohammed
- Frank Moher
- Monique Mojica
- Émilie Monnet
- Andrew Moodie
- Ellie Moon
- Fiona Moore
- Mavor Moore
- Robert Moore
- Greg Morrison
- Kim Morrissey
- Hannah Moscovitch
- Daniel David Moses
- Arthur Motyer
- Wajdi Mouawad
- Grace Helen Mowat
- Neil Munro
- Janet Munsil
- Colleen Murphy
- Rory Mullarkey
- John Murrell

== N ==
- Tony Nardi
- Michael Nathanson
- Yvette Naubert
- Dan Needles
- Louis Negin
- James W. Nichol
- Eric Nicol
- Éric Noël
- Francine Noël
- Yvette Nolan
- Alden Nowlan

== O ==
- Darren O'Donnell
- Sean Harris Oliver
- Anne-Marie Olivier
- Leo Orenstein
- Cathy Ostlere
- Mieko Ouchi

== P ==
- André Paiement
- Alisa Palmer
- John Palmer
- Morris Panych
- David Paquet
- Jivesh Parasram
- Amanda Parris
- Evalyn Parry
- Ngozi Paul
- Teresa Pavlinek
- Corey Payette
- Deborah Pearson
- Howard Pechet
- Soraya Peerbaye
- Maryse Pelletier
- Len Peterson
- Pierre Petitclair
- Adam Pettle
- M. NourbeSe Philip
- Marjorie Pickthall
- Joseph Jomo Pierre
- Gordon Pinsent
- Jean-Paul Pinsonneault
- Lorraine Pintal
- Al Pittman
- Richard Pochinko
- Sharon Pollock
- Helen Fogwill Porter
- Paul David Power
- Peter Pringle
- Stefan Psenak

== Q ==
- Joseph Quesnel
- Sina Queyras
- Christine Quintana

== R ==
- Gyllian Raby
- Lara Rae
- Gord Rand
- Karin Randoja
- James Reaney
- Kelly Rebar
- Michael Redhill
- Kim Renders
- Sean Reycraft
- Charlie Rhindress
- Christopher Richards
- Jael Richardson
- Gwen Pharis Ringwood
- Harry Rintoul
- Erika Ritter
- William Harris Lloyd Roberts
- Marie-Colombe Robichaud
- Ajmer Rode
- Jean-Pierre Ronfard
- Michael E. Rose
- Ian Ross
- Vittorio Rossi (Little Blood Brother, Backstreets, The Chain, The Last Adam, Paradise By The River, A Carpenter's Trilogy)
- Anusree Roy
- Matthew J. Royal
- Baņuta Rubess
- Saul Rubinek
- Armand Garnet Ruffo
- Rusty Ryan
- George Ryga

== S ==
- Oren Safdie
- Donna-Michelle St. Bernard
- Rick Salutin (1837, Les Canadiens)
- Jacob Sampson
- Kat Sandler (Mustard)
- Irene Sankoff
- Paolo Santalucia
- Booth Savage
- Marie Savard
- Emmanuel Schwartz
- Munroe Scott
- Djanet Sears (Harlem Duet, The Adventures of a Black Girl in Search of God)
- Adam Seelig
- Lorraine Segato
- Goh Poh Seng
- Sandra Shamas (My Boyfriend's Back and There's Gonna Be Laundry)
- Jason Sherman (The League of Nathans, Reading Hebron)
- Erin Shields (If We Were Birds)
- Tetsuro Shigematsu
- Rick Shiomi
- Reuben Ship
- Alfred Silver
- Beverley Rosen Simons
- Lister Sinclair
- Jaspreet Singh (Speak, Oppenheimer)
- Pamela Mala Sinha (Crash, Happy Place)
- Christine Sioui-Wawanoloath
- Sonja Skarstedt
- Bernard Slade
- Annabel Soutar
- Ron Sparks
- Harry Standjofski
- Kate Sterns
- Kent Stetson (The Harps of God, Warm Wind in China)
- Aurora Stewart de Peña
- Raymond Storey (The Saints and Apostles, The Glorious 12th)
- Allan Stratton (Rexy!, 72 Under the O)
- Cordelia Strube
- Addena Sumter-Freitag
- Jovanni Sy
- Olivier Sylvestre

== T ==
- Mariko Tamaki
- Ian Tamblyn
- Jordan Tannahill
- Drew Hayden Taylor
- Deanne Taylor
- Alex Tétreault
- Bobby Theodore
- Vern Thiessen
- Colin Thomas
- Andy Thompson (Broken Sex Doll, The Birth of Freedom)
- Judith Thompson
- Paul Thompson
- Peggy Thompson
- Scott Thompson
- Kristen Thomson (I, Claudia)
- Shannon Thunderbird
- Charles Tidler
- Sara Tilley
- Farren Timoteo
- Jackie Torrens
- Paul Toupin
- Theresa Tova
- Jennifer Tremblay
- Larry Tremblay (The Dragonfly of Chicoutimi)
- Lise Tremblay
- Michel Tremblay (Les Belles-sœurs, Albertine in Five Times)
- Roland Michel Tremblay
- Terry Tweed

== U ==
- Priscila Uppal
- Geoffrey Ursell

== V ==
- Lise Vaillancourt
- Guy Vanderhaeghe
- R. M. Vaughan
- Royce Vavrek
- Guillermo Verdecchia
- Mary Vingoe
- Padma Viswanathan
- Herman Voaden

== W ==
- Michael Wade
- Colleen Wagner
- Stephen Waldschmidt
- Craig Walker
- George F. Walker
- Tom Walmsley
- Agnes Walsh
- Chris Ward
- Dianne Warren
- David Watmough
- Robert Watson
- Wilfred Watson
- Irene N. Watts
- Alison Wearing
- Jennifer Wynne Webber
- Helen Weinzweig
- Michael Wex
- David Widdicombe
- Gina Wilkinson
- Alan Williams
- Kenneth T. Williams
- Leighton Alexander Williams
- Laakkuluk Williamson Bathory
- Jonathan Wilson
- Lance Woolaver
- Rachel Wyatt
- Betty Jane Wylie

== Y ==
- J. Michael Yates
- David Yee (lady in the red dress)
- Michael Yerxa
- Marcus Youssef
- Jean Yoon
- d'bi young
- David Young
- Josée Yvon

== Z ==
- Zaiba Baig

== See also ==
- Lists of Canadian writers
