= 2012 Governor General's Awards =

Canadian literary award

The shortlisted nominees for the 2012 Governor General's Awards for Literary Merit were announced on October 11, and the winners were announced on November 13.

== English ==
Category	Winner	Nominated
Fiction	Linda Spalding, The Purchase	Tamas Dobozy, Siege 13; Robert Hough, Dr. Brinkley's Tower; Vincent Lam, The Headmaster's Wager; Carrie Snyder, The Juliet Stories
Non-fiction	Ross King, Leonardo and the Last Supper	Nahlah Ayed, A Thousand Farewells: A Reporter's Journey from Refugee Camp to the Arab Spring; Carol Bishop-Gwyn, The Pursuit of Perfection: A Life of Celia Franca; Wade Davis, Into the Silence: The Great War, Mallory, and the Conquest of Everest; Noah Richler, What We Talk About When We Talk About War
Poetry	Julie Bruck, Monkey Ranch	David McGimpsey, Li'l Bastard; A. F. Moritz, The New Measures; Lisa Pasold, Any Bright Horse; James Pollock, Sailing to Babylon
Drama	Catherine Banks, It Is Solved By Walking	Trina Davies, The Romeo Initiative; Karen Hines, Drama: Pilot Episode; Cathy Ostlere and Dennis Garnhum, Lost: A Memoir; Anusree Roy, Brothel #9
Children's literature	Susin Nielsen, The Reluctant Journal of Henry K. Larsen	Rachel Hartman, Seraphina; Deborah Kerbel, Under the Moon; Judd Palmer, The Umbrella; Allan Stratton, The Grave Robber's Apprentice
Children's illustration	Isabelle Arsenault, Virginia Wolf	Renné Benoit, Big City Bees; Jon Klassen, House Held Up by Trees; David Parkins, In the Bag! Margaret Knight Wraps It Up; Barbara Reid, Picture a Tree
French to English translation	Nigel Spencer, Mai at the Predator's Ball (Marie-Claire Blais, Mai au bal des prédateurs)	Sheila Fischman, Ru (Kim Thúy, Ru); Michael Gilson, Mafia Inc.: The Long, Bloody Reign of Canada's Sicilian Clan (André Cédilot and André Noël, Mafia Inc. : Grandeur et misère du clan sicilien au Québec); John Murrell, The Small Room at the Top of the Stairs and Thinking of Yu (Carole Fréchette, La Petite pièce en haut de l'escalier and Je pense à Yu); Shelley Tepperman, The List (Jennifer Tremblay, La liste)

== French ==
Category	Winner	Nominated
Fiction	France Daigle, Pour sûr	Ryad Assani-Razaki, La main d'Iman; Charles Bolduc, Les truites à mains nues; Catherine Mavrikakis, Les derniers jours de Smokey Nelson; Audrée Wilhelmy, Oss
Non-fiction	Normand Chaurette, Comment tuer Shakespeare	Pierre Nepveu, Gaston Miron : La vie d'un homme; Pascal Riendeau, Méditation et vision de l'essai : Roland Barthes, Milan Kundera et Jacques Brault; Yannick Roy, La révélation inachevée : le personnage à l'épreuve de la vérité romanesque
Poetry	Maude Smith Gagnon, Un drap. Une place.	Corinne Chevarier, Anatomie de l'objet; Fredric Gary Comeau, Souffles; Hélène Dorion, Cœurs, comme livres d'amour; Christian Saint-Germain, Tomahawk
Drama	Geneviève Billette, Contre le temps	Simon Boudreault, D pour Dieu?; Fabien Cloutier, Billy (Les jours de hurlement); Évelyne de la Chenelière, La chair et autres fragments de l'amour; Philippe Ducros, Dissidents
Children's literature	Aline Apostolska, Un été d'amour et de cendres	Biz, La chute de Sparte (withdrawn from competition); Louise Bombardier, Quand j'étais chien; Camille Bouchard, Le coup de la giraffe; François Gravel, Hò
Children's illustration	Élise Gravel, La clé à molette	Marion Arbona, Lapin-Chagrin et les jours d'Elko; Manon Gauthier, Giroflée Pois-Cassé; Émilie Leduc, La ronde des mois; Katty Maurey, Quand j'étais chien
English to French translation	Alain Roy, Glenn Gould (Mark Kingwell)	Sophie Cardinal-Corriveau, Un adieu à la musique (Charles Foran, Carolan's Farewell); Dominique Fortier, Une maison dans les nuages (Margaret Laurence, The Prophet's Camel Bell); Lori Saint-Martin and Paul Gagné, Irma Voth (Miriam Toews, Irma Voth); Lori Saint-Martin and Paul Gagné, La petite cousine de Freud (Ann Charney, Distantly Related to Freud)
