= 2005 Governor General's Awards =

Canadian literary award

The 2005 Governor General's Awards for Literary Merit: Finalists in 14 categories (69 books) were announced October 17, winners announced November 16. The four children's literature awards were presented November 22, others presented November 23. The prize for writers and illustrators was $15,000 and "a specially crafted copy of the winning book bound by Montreal bookbinder Lise Dubois".

The winners were announced at the Bibliothèque nationale du Québec in Montreal, rather than at Library and Archives Canada in Ottawa, "[i]n honour of the designation of Montreal as UNESCO World Book Capital for 2005–2006".

As introduced in 2003, the four children's literature awards were announced and presented separately from the others. The event at Rideau Hall, the Governor General's residence in Ottawa, was scheduled to begin at 10:00 on a Tuesday morning. "Children from across the National Capital Region will be invited to attend the event, which will also include readings and workshops by the award winners."

== English ==
Category	Winner	Nominated
Fiction	David Gilmour, A Perfect Night to Go to China	Joseph Boyden, Three Day Road; Golda Fried, Nellcott is My Darling; Charlotte Gill, Ladykiller; Kathy Page, Alphabet
Non-fiction	John Vaillant, The Golden Spruce: A True Story of Myth, Madness and Greed	Ted Bishop, Riding with Rilke: Reflections on Motorcycles and Books; Michael Mitchell, The Molly Fire; Edward Shorter, Written in the Flesh: A History of Desire; Jessica Warner, The Incendiary: The Misadventures of John the Painter, First Modern Terrorist
Poetry	Anne Compton, Processional	Barry Dempster, The Burning Alphabet; Erín Moure, Little Theatres; W. H. New, Underwood Log; Olive Senior, Over the Roofs of the World
Drama	John Mighton, Half Life	Marjorie Chan, China Doll; Don Druick, Through the Eyes; Daniel MacIvor, Cul-de-sac; Richard Sanger, Two Words for Snow
Children's literature	Pamela Porter, The Crazy Man	Francis Chalifour, After; Barbara Nickel, Hannah Waters and the Daughter of Johann Sebastian Bach; Gail Nyoka, Mella and the N'anga: An African Tale; Shyam Selvadurai, Swimming in the Monsoon Sea
Children's illustration	Rob Gonsalves, Imagine a Day (Sarah L. Thomson)	Kyrsten Brooker, City Angel (Eileen Spinelli); Wallace Edwards, Mixed Beasts (Kenyon Cox); Murray Kimber, The Highwayman (Alfred Noyes); Rajka Kupesic, Maria Chapdelaine (Louis Hémon)
French to English translation	Fred A. Reed, Truth or Death: The Quest for Immortality in the Western Narrative Tradition (Thierry Hentsch, Raconter et mourir : aux sources narratives de l'imaginaire occidental)	Jane Brierley, America: The Lewis and Clark Expedition and the Dawn of a New Power (Denis Vaugeois, America, 1803-1853 : l'expédition de Lewis & Clark et la naissance d'une nouvelle puissance); Susanne de Lotbinière-Harwood, Yesterday, at the Hotel Clarendon (Nicole Brossard, Hier); Wayne Grady, Return from Africa (Francine D'Amour, Le Retour d'Afrique); Fred A. Reed and David Homel, All that Glitters (Martine Desjardins, L'Élu du hasard)

== French ==
Category	Winner	Nominated
Fiction	Aki Shimazaki, Hotaru	Marie-Claire Blais, Augustino et le chœur de la destruction; Nicolas Dickner, Nikolski; Christiane Frenette, Après la nuit rouge; Guy Lalancette, Un amour empoulaillé
Non-fiction	Michel Bock, Quand la nation débordait les frontières: les minorités françaises dans la pensée de Lionel Groulx	Paul Bleteau and Mario Poirier, Le vagabond stoïque: Louis Hémon; Gilles Dostaler, Keynes et ses combats; Éric Méchoulan, Le livre avalé: de la littérature entre mémoire et culture (XVIe – XVIIIe siècle); Sébastien Vincent, Laissés dans l'ombre: les Québécois engagés volontaires de 39-45 (ou quatorze Québécois racontent leur participation volontaire à la Seconde Guerre mondiale)
Poetry	Jean-Marc Desgent, Vingtièmes siècles	Marc André Brouillette, M'accompagne; François Dumont, Brisures; Danielle Fournier, Il n'y a rien d'intact dans ma chair; Fernand Ouellette, L'Inoubliable: Chronique I
Drama	Geneviève Billette, Le Pays des genoux	Jean-Rock Gaudreault, Pour ceux qui croient que la Terre est ronde; François Godin, Louisiane Nord; Marie-Christine Lê-Huu, Jouliks
Children's literature	Camille Bouchard, Le Ricanement des hyènes	Alain M. Bergeron, Les Tempêtes ou Les mémoires d'un Beatle raté; Jean-Pierre Davidts, Le Baiser de la sangsue; Danielle Marcotte, Les sabots rouges; Sylvain Meunier, L'homme à la bicyclette
Children's illustration	Isabelle Arsenault, Le cœur de monsieur Gauguin (Marie-Danielle Croteau)	Pascale Constantin, La vie comptée de Raoul Lecompte (Gilles Tibo); Luc Melanson, Les compositeurs (Claudio Ricignuolo); Stéphane Poulin, Un chant de Noël (Lucie Papineau); Pierre Pratt, Le jour où Zoé zozota (Pierre Pratt)
English to French translation	Rachel Martinez, Glenn Gould: une vie (Kevin Bazzana, Wondrous Strange: The Life and Art of Glenn Gould)	Benoit Léger, Miracles en série (Carol Shields, Various Miracles); Lori Saint-Martin and Paul Gagné, Drôle de tendresse (Miriam Toews, A Complicated Kindness); Lori Saint-Martin and Paul Gagné, La fille du Kamikaze (Kerri Sakamoto, One Hundred Million Hearts); Lori Saint-Martin and Paul Gagné, Le Vol du corbeau (Ann-Marie MacDonald, The Way the Crow Flies)
