= Martin Bellemare =

Canadian playwright

Martin Bellemare is a Canadian playwright. He is most noted for his plays Le chant de Georges Boivin, which won the Prix Gratien-Gélinas in 2009, and Cœur minéral, which won the Governor General's Award for French-language drama at the 2020 Governor General's Awards.

A graduate of the National Theatre School of Canada, he was a finalist for the Siminovitch Prize in Theatre in 2020.

== Works ==
- Quelque chose de beau (2005)
- Le bilboquet ou la folie racontée aux enfants (2006)
- Cabaret au bazar, Un cabaret musical pour les petits (2006, collective work with Fabien Cloutier, Louis-Dominique Lavigne, Suzanne Lebeau, Jean-Philippe Lehoux, Étienne Lepage, Marilyn Perreault, Philippe Robert and Lise Vaillancourt)
- Tuer le moustique (2008)
- Un château sur le dos (2008)
- Le chant de Georges Boivin (2009)
- La liberté (2011)
- La chute de l'escargot (2011)
- Des pieds et des mains (2012)
- Contes urbains (2013, collective work with Sébastien David, Rébecca Déraspe, Annick Lefebvre, Julie-Anne Ranger-Beauregard and Olivier Sylvestre)
- Saucisse bacon (2013)
- Nouvelles pratiques commerciales (2013)
- L'Armoire (2013)
- Assistance à personne en danger (2014)
- Barbus au sommet d'une montagne (2015)
- Territoire (2015)
- Le cri de la girafe (2015)
- L'oreille de mer (2016)
- Moule Robert (2016)
- Maître Karim la perdrix (2016)
- Par tes yeux (2017)
- Amours profonds (2017)
- Cœur minéral (2017)
- Le bizarre jour bizarre où (2017)
- L'échelle (2018)
