= François Godin =

François Godin may refer to:

- François Benjamin Godin, a 19th-century Canadian politician
- François Godin, a contemporary Canadian playwright and actor
