= Linda Gaboriau =

Canadian dramaturg and literary translator

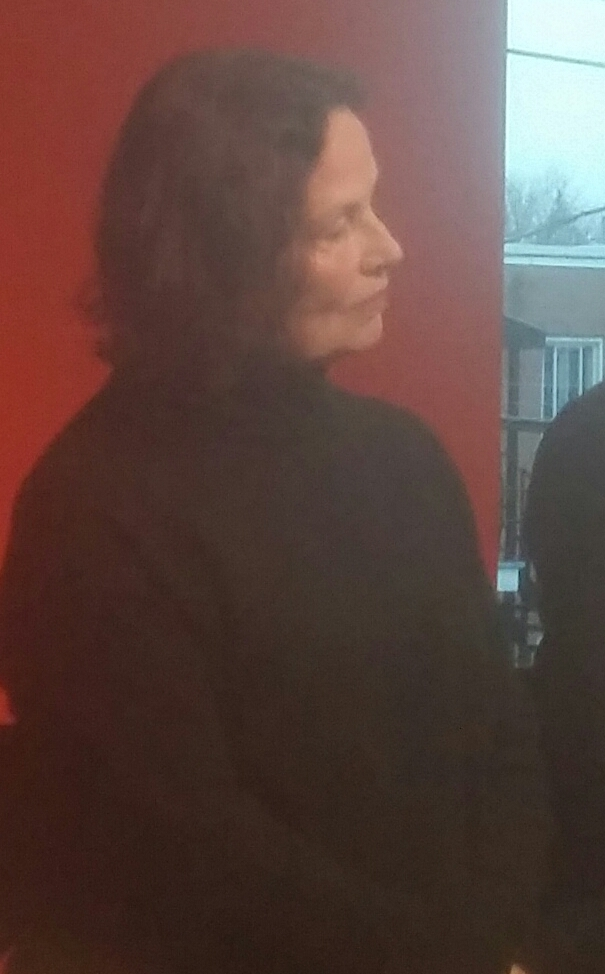
Gaboriau in Montreal, Quebec, inside the Aux Écuries Theatre

Linda Gaboriau (née Johnson) is a Canadian dramaturg and literary translator who has translated some 125 plays and novels by Quebec writers, including many of the Quebec plays best known to English-speaking audiences.

== Background ==
A native of Boston, she moved to Montreal in 1963 to pursue her studies at McGill University where she obtained a B.A. and M.A. in French language and literature. While a student, she was briefly married to a man whose surname was Gaboriau; although the marriage was short-lived, she kept his surname as her professional pen name.

She has worked as a freelance journalist for the Canadian Broadcasting Corporation (CBC), Radio Canada and the Montreal Gazette, pursued a career in Canadian and Quebec theatre and, in the 2000s, served as the founding director of the Banff International Literary Translation Centre.

== Work ==
Her translations have garnered many awards, including three Floyd S. Chalmers Canadian Play Awards for Michel Marc Bouchard's Lilies (Les Feluettes) in 1992, Normand Chaurette's The Queens (Les Reines) in 1993 and Bouchard's The Orphan Muses (Les Muses orphelines) in 1999; the Dora Mavor Moore Award for Outstanding New Play in 1991 for Lilies and in 2000 for Michel Tremblay's For the Pleasure of Seeing Her Again (Encore une fois si vous permettez); three Governor General's Awards for French to English translation in 1996 for Daniel Danis's Stone and Ashes (Cendres de cailloux), in 2010 for Wajdi Mouawad's Forests (Forêts) and in 2019 for Mouawad's Birds of a Kind (Tous des oiseaux); and the 2014 Lambda Literary Award for Drama for Bouchard's Tom at the Farm (Tom à la ferme).

She was named a Member of the Order of Canada in 2015 and Officer of the Ordre National du Québec in 2023.

== Personal life ==
Gaboriau was previously married to Montreal city councillor Nick Auf der Maur, and is the mother of rock musician Melissa Auf der Maur. She and her late partner of 35 years, author and professor Hervé de Fontenay, have one son, architect Yves de Fontenay.

== Works translated ==
A selected list of Gaboriau's translations includes:

- 1983 — Saga of the Wet Hens (Jovette Marchessault, La Saga des poules mouillées)
- 1987 — Being at Home with Claude (René-Daniel Dubois, Being at Home with Claude)
- 1989 — Warriors (Michel Garneau, Les guerriers)
- 1991 — Lilies (Michel Marc Bouchard, Les feluettes)
- 1992 — The Magnificent Voyage of Emily Carr (Jovette Marchessault, Le voyage magnifique d'Emily Carr)
- 1993 — The Eye Is an Eagle (Pierre Morency, L'Œil américain)
- 1993 — The Orphan Muses (Michel Marc Bouchard, Les muses orphelines)
- 1996 — American Notebooks (Marie-Claire Blais, Notes américaines/Parcours d'un écrivain)
- 1996 — Stone and Ashes (Daniel Danis, Cendres de cailloux)
- 1998 — That Woman (Daniel Danis, Celle-là)
- 1998 — The Tale of Teeka (Michel Marc Bouchard, L'histoire de l'oie)
- 1998 — Fragments of a Farewell Letter Read by Geologists (Normand Chaurette, Fragments d'une lettre d'adieu lus par des géologues)
- 1998 — The Queens (Normand Chaurette, Les Reines)
- 1998 — For the Pleasure of Seeing Her Again (Michel Tremblay, Encore une fois, si vous le permettez)
- 1999 — The Coronation Voyage (Michel Marc Bouchard, Le voyage du Couronnement)
- 1999 — Song of the Say-Sayer (Daniel Danis, La chant du Dire-Dire)
- 2000 — Down Dangerous Passes Road (Michel Marc Bouchard, Le chemin des Passes-dangereuses)
- 2000 — All the Verdis of Venice (Normand Chaurette, Je vous écris du Caire)
- 2002 — Impromptu on Nuns' Island (Michel Tremblay, L'État des lieux)
- 2003 — Scattered in a Rising Wind (Jean-Marc Dalpé, Un vent se lève qui éparpille)
- 2004 — Written on Water (Michel Marc Bouchard, Les manuscrits du déluge)
- 2004 — Past Perfect (Michel Tremblay, Le passé antérieur)
- 2005 — Scorched (Wajdi Mouawad, Incendies)
- 2006 — Assorted Candies (Michel Tremblay, Bonbons assortis)
- 2009 — Albertine in Five Times (Michel Tremblay, Albertine, en cinq temps)
- 2010 — Forests (Wajdi Mouawad, Forêts)
- 2013 — Heavens (Wajdi Mouawad, Ciels)
- 2014 — Christina, The Girl King (Michel Marc Bouchard, Christine, la reine-garçon)
- 2015 — Tom at the Farm (Michel Marc Bouchard, Tom à la ferme)
- 2015 — The Divine, A Play for Sarah Bernhardt (Michel Marc Bouchard, La Divine illusion)
- 2015 — Yours Forever, Marie-Lou (Michel Tremblay, À toi, pour toujours, ta Marie-Lou)
- 2017 — Anima (Wajdi Mouawad, Anima)
- 2019 — Birds of a Kind (Wajdi Mouawad, Tous des oiseaux)
- 2019 — Rite of Passage (Michel Tremblay, Le Passage obligé)
- 2022 — Kisses Deep (Michel Marc Bouchard, Embrasse)
- 2022 — Twists of Fate (Michel Tremblay, Au hasard la chance et Les cléfs du Paradise)
