= Billette =

Billette is a surname. Notable people with the surname include:

- Geneviève Billette, Canadian writer and translator
- Stéphane Billette, Canadian politician
