= Governor General's Award for French-language drama =

Canadian literary award

This is a list of recipients of the Governor General's Award for French-language drama. The award was created in 1981 when the Governor General's Award for French language poetry or drama was divided.

Because the award is presented for plays published in print, a play's eligibility for the award can sometimes be several years later than its initial theatrical staging. Titles which compile several works by the playwright into a single volume may also be nominated for or win the award.

== Winners and nominees ==
=== 1980s ===
Year	Author	Title
1981	Marie Laberge	C'était avant la guerre à l'anse à Gilles
1981	Jean-Pierre Ronfard	Vie et mort du Roi Boiteux
1982	Réjean Ducharme	Ha ha! ...
1982	Marie Laberge	Avec l'hiver qui s'en vient
1982	Léo Lévesque	... Quand j'y ai dit ça ... à parti à rire
1982	Jovette Marchessault	La terre est trop courte, Violette Leduc
1983	René Gingras	Syncope
1983	Michelle Allen	La passion de Juliette
1983	René-Daniel Dubois	26 bis, impasse du Colonel Foisy
1984	René-Daniel Dubois	Ne blâmez jamais les Bédouins
1984	Gilbert Dupuis	Les Transporteurs de monde
1984	Marcel Sabourin	Pleurer pour rire
1984	Michel Tremblay	Albertine, en cinq temps
1985	Maryse Pelletier	Duo pour voix obstinées
1985	Michel Marc Bouchard	La poupée de Pélopia
1985	Francine Noël	Chandeleur
1986	Anne Legault	La visite des sauvages
1986	Normand Chaurette	Fragments d'une lettre d'adieu lus par des géologues
1986	Yves Desgagnés, Louise Roy	Les nouilles
1986	Jean-Pierre Ronfard	Le Titanic
1987	Jeanne-Mance Delisle	Un oiseau vivant dans la gueule
1987	Suzanne Aubry	La Nuit des p'tits couteaux
1987	Marie Laberge	Oublier
1987	Michel Tremblay	Le vrai monde?
1988	Jean-Marc Dalpé	Le Chien
1988	Normand Canac-Marquis	Le Syndrome de Cézanne
1988	Marie-Francine Hébert	Oui ou non
1988	Marco Micone	Déjà l'agonie
1988	André Ricard	Le Déversoir des larmes
1989	Michel Garneau	Mademoiselle Rouge
1989	Michel Marc Bouchard	Les Muses orphelines
1989	Robert Claing	La Femme d'intérieur

=== 1990s ===
Year	Author	Title
1990	Jovette Marchessault	Le Voyage magnifique d'Emily Carr
1990	René-Daniel Dubois	Le Troisième fils du professeur Yourolov
1990	Anne Hébert	L'Île de la Demoiselle
1991	Gilbert Dupuis	Mon oncle Marcel qui vague vague près du métro Berri
1991	Victor-Lévy Beaulieu	La maison cassée
1991	Michel Marc Bouchard	L'Histoire de l'oie
1991	Dominic Champagne	La répétition
1991	Suzanne Lebeau	Conte du jour et de la nuit
1992	Louis-Dominique Lavigne	Les petits orteils
1992	Dominic Champagne	La cité interdite
1992	Robert Claing	Anna
1992	Marie Laberge	Pierre ou la consolation
1992	Marthe Mercure	Tu faisais comme un appel
1993	Daniel Danis	Celle-là
1993	Jasmine Dubé	Petit Monstre
1993	Gilbert Dupuis	Kushapatshikan
1994	Michel Ouellette	French Town
1994	Michelle Allen	Morgane
1994	Yvan Bienvenue	Histoires à mourir d'amour
1994	Claude Poissant	Si tu meurs, je te tue
1994	Jean-Pierre Ronfard	Cinq études
1995	Carole Fréchette	Les Quatre Morts de Marie
1995	Jean-Marc Dalpé	Lucky Lady
1995	Suzanne Lebeau	Contes d'enfants réels
1995	Michèle Magny	Marina, le dernier rose aux joues
1996	Normand Chaurette	Le Passage de l'Indiana
1996	Suzanne Lebeau	Salvador – La Montagne, l'Enfant et la Mangue
1996	Wajdi Mouawad	Alphonse
1997	Yvan Bienvenue	Dits et Inédits
1997	Jasmine Dubé	La Bonne Femme
1997	Marie-Line Laplante	Une tache sur la lune
1997	Robert Marinier	L'Insomnie
1997	Larry Tremblay	Ogre – Cornemuse
1998	François Archambault	15 secondes
1998	Serge Boucher	Motel Hélène
1998	Olivier Choinière	Le Bain des raines
1998	Carole Fréchette	La Peau d'Élisa
1998	Suzanne Lebeau	L'Ogrelet
1999	Jean-Marc Dalpé	Il n'y a que l'amour
1999	Carole Fréchette	Les Sept Jours de Simon Labrosse
1999	René Gingras	D'Avila
1999	Michel Tremblay	Encore une fois, si vous permettez

=== 2000s ===
Year	Author	Title
2000	Wajdi Mouawad	Littoral
2000	Geneviève Billette	Crime contre l'humanité
2000	Serge Boucher	24 Poses
2000	Jasmine Dubé	L'Arche de Noémie
2000	Lise Vaillancourt	Le petit dragon and La balade de Fannie et Carcassonne
2001	Normand Chaurette	Le Petit Köchel
2001	François Archambault	Code 99
2001	Réjane Charpentier	Un Autre Monde
2001	Michel Ouellette	Requiem
2002	Daniel Danis	Le Langue-à-Langue des chiens de roche
2002	Carole Fréchette	Jean et Béatrice
2002	Wajdi Mouawad	Rêves
2002	Reynald Robinson	L'Hôtel des Horizons
2002	Pierre-Michel Tremblay	Le rire de la mer
2003	Jean-Rock Gaudreault	Deux pas vers les étoiles
2003	François Archambault	La société des loisirs
2003	François Létourneau	Cheech
2003	Wajdi Mouawad	Incendies
2003	Jean-Pierre Ronfard	Écriture pour le théâtre, tome III
2004	Emma Haché	L'intimité
2004	Franco Catanzariti	Sahel
2004	Alexis Martin	Bureaux
2004	Jean-Frédéric Messier	Au moment de sa disparition
2004	Reynald Robinson	La salle des loisirs
2005	Geneviève Billette	Le Pays des genoux
2005	Jean-Rock Gaudreault	Pour ceux qui croient que la Terre est ronde
2005	François Godin	Louisiane Nord
2005	Marie-Christine Lê-Huu	Jouliks
2006	Évelyne de la Chenelière	Désordre public
2006	Olivier Choinière	Venise-en-Québec
2006	Jean-Marc Dalpé	Août: un repas à la campagne
2006	Reynald Robinson	Blue Bayou, la maison de l’étalon
2007	Daniel Danis	Le chant du Dire-Dire
2007	Sébastien Harrisson	Floes et D’Alaska
2007	Steve Laplante	Le Long de la Principale
2007	Suzanne Lebeau	Souliers de sable
2007	Wajdi Mouawad	Assoiffés
2008	Jennifer Tremblay	La liste
2008	Yvan Bienvenue	La vie continue
2008	Carole Fréchette	Serial Killer et autres pièces courtes
2008	Catherine Mavrikakis	Omaha Beach
2008	Wajdi Mouawad	Le soleil ni la mort ne peuvent se regarder en face
2009	Suzanne Lebeau	Le bruit des os qui craquent
2009	Évelyne de la Chenelière	Les pieds des anges
2009	François Godin	Je suis d'un would be pays
2009	Olivier Kemeid	L'Énéide
2009	Louis-Dominique Lavigne	Glouglou

=== 2010s ===
Year	Author	Title
2010	David Paquet	Porc-épic
2010	Geneviève Billette	Les ours dorment enfin
2010	Évelyne de la Chenelière	L’imposture
2010	Emma Haché	Trafiquée
2010	Gilles Poulin-Denis	Rearview
2011	Normand Chaurette	Ce qui meurt en dernier
2011	Steve Gagnon	La montagne rouge (SANG)
2011	Pierre-Luc Lasalle	Judith aussi
2011	Étienne Lepage	L'enclos de l'éléphant
2011	Wajdi Mouawad	Journée de noces chez les Cromagnons
2012	Geneviève Billette	Contre le temps
2012	Simon Boudreault	D pour Dieu?
2012	Fabien Cloutier	Billy (Les jours de hurlement)
2012	Évelyne de la Chenelière	La chair et autres fragments de l'amour
2012	Philippe Ducros	Dissidents
2013	Fanny Britt	Bienveillance
2013	Michel Marc Bouchard	Christine, la reine-garçon
2013	Olivier Choinière	Nom de domaine
2013	Véronique Côté	Tout ce qui tombe
2013	Érika Tremblay-Roy	Petite vérité inventée
2014	Carole Fréchette	Small Talk
2014	François Archambault	Tu te souviendras de moi
2014	Simon Boudreault	As is (tel quel)
2014	Olivier Kemeid	Moi, dans les ruines rouges du siècle
2014	Étienne Lepage	Histoires pour faire des cauchemars
2015	Fabien Cloutier	Pour réussir un poulet
2015	Simon Boudreault	En cas de pluie, aucun remboursement
2015	Jean-Rock Gaudreault	Jouez, Monsieur Molière!
2015	Annick Lefebvre	J'accuse
2015	Olivier Sylvestre	La beauté du monde
2016	Wajdi Mouawad	Inflammation du verbe vivre
2016	Hervé Bouchard	Le faux pas de l'actrice dans sa traîne
2016	Michel Marc Bouchard	La divine illusion
2016	Sébastien David	Les haut-parleurs
2016	Olivier Kemeid	Five Kings : l'histoire de notre chute
2017	Sébastien David	Dimanche napalm
2017	Nathalie Boisvert	Antigone au printemps
2017	Emma Haché	Exercice de l'oubli
2017	Suzanne Lebeau	Trois petites sœurs
2017	Kevin McCoy	Norge
2018	Anne-Marie Olivier	Venir au monde
2018	Christine Beaulieu	J'aime Hydro
2018	Steve Gagnon	La montagne blanche
2018	Guillaume Lapierre-Desnoyers	Invisibles
2018	Michel Tremblay	Enfant insignifiant!
2019	Mishka Lavigne	Havre
2019	Évelyne de la Chenelière	La vie utile, précédé de Errance et tremblements
2019	Rachel Graton	La nuit du 4 au 5
2019	Lisa L'Heureux	Et si un soir
2019	Annick Lefebvre	ColoniséEs

=== 2020s ===
Year	Author	Title	Ref
2020	Martin Bellemare	Cœur minéral	
2020	Le Collectif Aalaapi (Louisa Naluiyuk, Akinisie Novalinga, Mélodie Duplessis, Audrey Alasuak and Samantha Leclerc)	Aalaapi, faire silence pour entendre quelque chose de beau	
2020	Suzie Bastien	Sucré seize (Huit filles)	
2020	Olivier Choinière	Zoé	
2020	Claude Guilmain	AmericanDream.ca : L'intégrale	
2021	Mishka Lavigne	Copeaux	
2021	Rébecca Déraspe	Combattre le why-why	
2021	Emma Haché	Johnny	
2021	Jean-Philippe Lehoux	Bande de bouffons	
2021	Émilie Monnet	Okinum	
2022	David Paquet	Le poids des fourmis	
2022	Caroline Bélisle	Les remugles, ou La danse nuptiale est une langue morte	
2022	Nadia Girard Eddahia	Disgrâce	
2022	Liliane Gougeon Moisan	L'Art de vivre	
2022	Marie-Claude Verdier	Seeker	
2023	Mathieu Gosselin	Gros gars	
2023	Martin Bellemare	Charlie, du vent derrière le nombril	
2023	Rébecca Déraspe	Les Glaces	
2023	Nathalie Doummar	Mama	
2023	Soleil Launière	Akuteu	
2024	Sarah Berthiaume	Wollstonecraft	
2024	Olivier Choinière	La dernière cassette : Un portrait d’André Brassard	
2024	Isabelle Hubert	Rose	
2024	Geneviève Labelle, Mélodie Noël Rousseau	Ciseaux	
2024	Johanne Parent	Ornithorynques	
2025	Éric Noël	Ces regards amoureux de garçons altérés	
2025	Maxime Brillon	Awards	
2025	Rébecca Déraspe	Fanny	
2025	Olivier Kemeid	La vengeance et l’oubli	
2025	Danièle LeBlanc	Paysages	
2026	Hoda Adra	L’histoire de comment je me suis séparée en deux	
2026	François Édouard Bernier, Dany Boudreault, Maxime Carbonneau, Sébastien David, Christian Fortin, Célia Gouin-Arsenault, Joephillip Lafortune, Matéo Pineault	Corps fantômes	
2026	Stéphanie Labbé	Après t’avoir bordé tendrement, je meurs	
2026	Marie-Christine Lê-Huu	Marie-Christine Lê-Huu, Faon	
2026	Stephie Mazunya	Chronologies	
