= Choinière =

Choinière is a French surname. Notable people with the surname include:

- David Choinière (born 1997), Canadian soccer player
- Mathieu Choinière (born 1999), Canadian soccer player, brother of David
- Olivier Choinière (born 1973), Canadian playwright
