= 2015 Governor General's Awards =

Canadian literary award

The shortlisted nominees for the 2015 Governor General's Awards for Literary Merit were announced on October 7, 2015, and the winners were announced on October 28.

== English ==
Category	Winner	Nominated
Fiction	Guy Vanderhaeghe, Daddy Lenin and Other Stories	Kate Cayley, How You Were Born; Rachel Cusk, Outline; Helen Humphreys, The Evening Chorus; Clifford Jackman, The Winter Family
Non-fiction	Mark L. Winston, Bee Time: Lessons from the Hive	Ted Bishop, The Social Life of Ink: Culture, Wonder, and Our Relationship with the Written Word; David Halton, Dispatches from the Front: Matthew Halton, Canada's Voice at War; Michael Harris, Party of One: Stephen Harper and Canada's Radical Makeover; Armand Garnet Ruffo, Norval Morrisseau: Man Changing into Thunderbird
Poetry	Robyn Sarah, My Shoes Are Killing Me	Kayla Czaga, For Your Safety Please Hold On; Liz Howard, Infinite Citizen of the Shaking Tent; M. Travis Lane, Crossover; Patrick Lane, Washita
Drama	David Yee, carried away on the crest of a wave	Beth Graham, The Gravitational Pull of Bernice Trimble; Tara Grammy and Tom Arthur Davis, Mahmoud; Bryden MacDonald, Odd Ducks; Marcus Youssef and James Long, Winners and Losers
Children's literature	Caroline Pignat, The Gospel Truth	Dan Bar-el, Audrey (cow); Darren Groth, Are You Seeing Me?; Susin Nielsen, We Are All Made of Molecules; Emil Sher, Young Man with Camera
Children's illustration	JonArno Lawson and Sydney Smith, Sidewalk Flowers	Andy Jones and Darka Erdelji, Jack, the King of Ashes; Kyo Maclear and Marion Arbona, The Good Little Book; John Martz, A Cat Named Tim and Other Stories; Mélanie Watt, Bug in a Vacuum
French to English translation	Rhonda Mullins, Twenty-One Cardinals (Jocelyne Saucier, Les Héritiers de la mine)	David Scott Hamilton, Captive (Claudine Dumont, Anabiose); Lazer Lederhendler, The Lake (Perrine Leblanc, Malabourg); Susan Ouriou and Christelle Morelli, Stolen Sisters: The Story of Two Missing Girls, Their Families and How Canada Has Failed Indigenous Women (Emmanuelle Walter, Sœurs volées: Enquête sur un féminicide au Canada); Donald Winkler, Arvida (Samuel Archibald, Arvida)

== French ==
Category	Winner	Nominated
Fiction	Nicolas Dickner, Six degrés de liberté	Françoise de Luca, Sena; Marilyne Fortin, La Fabrica; Catherine Harton, Traité des peaux; Dominique Scali, À la recherche de New Babylon
Non-fiction	Jean-Philippe Warren, Honoré Beaugrand : La plume et l'épée (1848-1906)	Alain Asselin, Jacques Cayouette and Jacques Mathieu, Curieuses histoires de plantes du Canada, tome 1; Ying Chen, La lenteur des montagnes; Chantal Savoie, Les femmes de lettres canadiennes-françaises au tournant du XXe siècle; Patricia Smart, De Marie de l'Incarnation à Nelly Arcan; Se dire, se faire par l'écriture intime
Poetry	Joël Pourbaix, Le mal du pays est un art oublié	Martine Audet, Tête première / Dos / Contre dos; François Baril Pelletier, Les trésors tamisés; Jean-Philippe Dupuis, Langue maternelle; René Lapierre, La carte des feux
Drama	Fabien Cloutier, Pour réussir un poulet	Simon Boudreault, En cas de pluie, aucun remboursement; Jean-Rock Gaudreault, Jouez, Monsieur Molière!; Annick Lefebvre, J'accuse; Olivier Sylvestre, La beauté du monde
Children's literature	Louis-Philippe Hébert, Marie Réparatrice	Camille Bouchard, Les Forces du désordre; Denis Côté, Dessine-moi un martien; Roger Des Roches, Boîtamémoire; Sandra Dussault, Direction Saint-Creux-des-Meuh-Meuh
Children's illustration	André Marois and Patrick Doyon, Le voleur de sandwichs	Jacques Goldstyn, L'arbragan; Mireille Levert, Quand j'écris avec mon cœur; Mélanie Perreault and Marion Arbona, Rosalie entre chien et chat; Renée Robitaille and Philippe Béha, Douze oiseaux
English to French translation	Lori Saint-Martin and Paul Gagné, Solomon Gursky (Mordecai Richler, Solomon Gursky Was Here)	Christiane Duchesne, Élisabeth dans le pétrin (Susan Glickman, Bernadette in the Doghouse); Catherine Ego, Voisins et ennemis. La Guerre de sécession et l'invention du Canada (John Boyko, Blood and Daring : How Canada Fought the American Civil War and Forged a Nation); Marie Frankland, MxT (Sina Queyras, MxT); Rachel Martinez, Ma vie (racontée malgré moi) par Henry K. Larsen (Susin Nielsen, The Reluctant Journal of Henry K. Larsen)
