= Joël Pourbaix =

Canadian poet (born 1958)

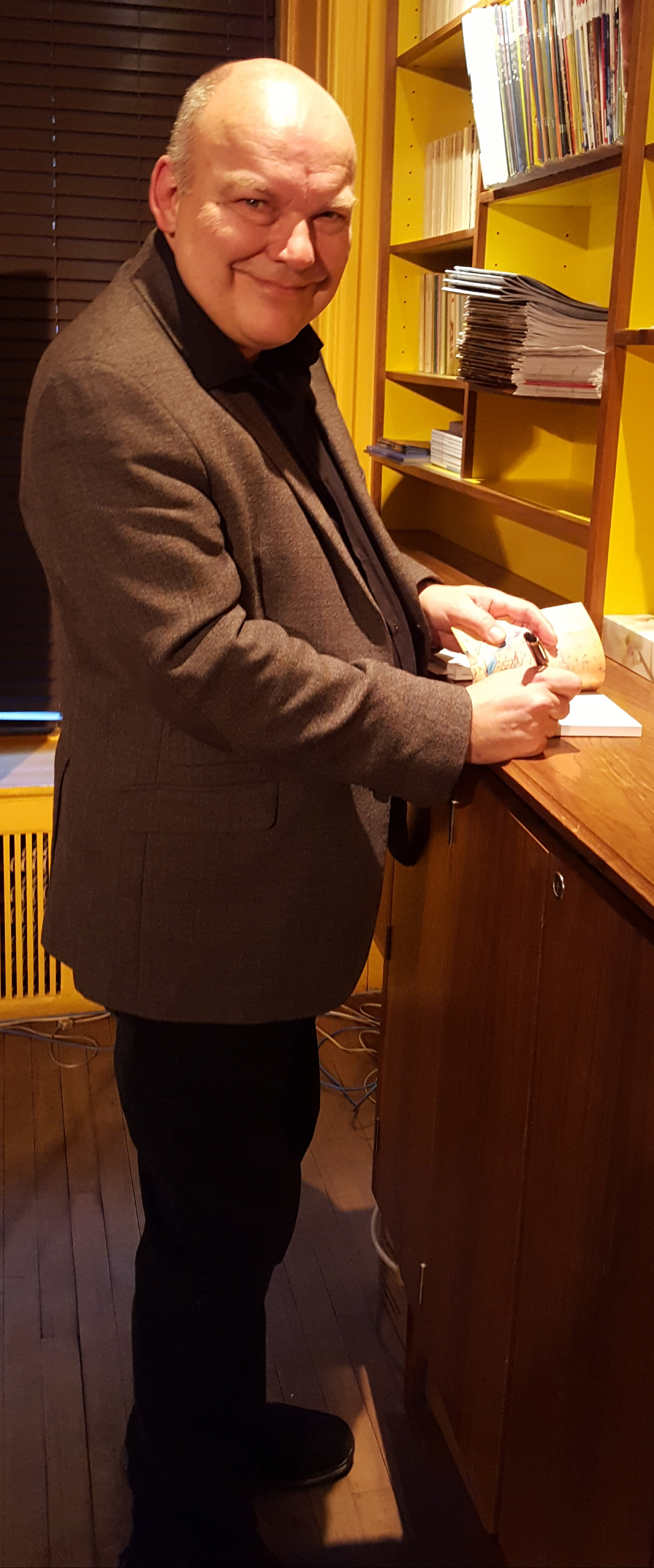
- Joël Pourbaix
- Born: June 2, 1958 (age 68); Montreal, Quebec, Canada
- Occupation: writer
- Writing career
- Genre: poetry
- Notable work: Le mal du pays est un art oublié

Joël Pourbaix (born June 2, 1958) is a Canadian poet. He won the Governor General's Award for French language poetry at the 2015 Governor General's Awards for his collection Le mal du pays est un art oublié.

== Life ==
He has reported for Radio Canada. He lives in Montreal.

== Works ==
- Séquences initiales (1980)
- Sous les débris du réel (1985)
- Vous oublierez de nous séduire (1986)
- Dans les plis de l'écriture (1987)
- Passage mexicain (1989)
- Le Simple geste d'exister (1989)
- Voyages d'un ermite et autres révoltes (1992)
- La survie des éblouissements (1994)
- On ne naît jamais chez soi (1996)
- Les enfants de Mélusine (1999)
- Disparaître n'est pas tout (2001)
- Labyrinthe 5 (2003)
- Les morts de l'infini (2005)
- Dictature de la solitude (2008)
- Le mal du pays est un art oublié (2014)
