= Dora Mavor Moore Award for Best Leading Actor (Musical Theatre) =

The Dora Mavor Moore Award for Outstanding Performance by a Male in a Principal Role - Musical is an annual award celebrating achievements in live Canadian theatre.

== Winners and nominees ==
=== 1980s ===
| Year | Actor | Play | Ref |
|---|---|---|---|
| 1981 | Heath Lamberts | A Funny Thing Happened on the Way to the Forum | |
| 1981 | Brian McKay | The Boyfriend | |
| 1981 | Rudy Webb | We Got Love | |
| 1981 | Elias Zarou | Toronto, Toronto | |
| 1982 | Charles Fletcher | Rock and Roll | |
| 1982 | Derek McGrath | To Mock a Kilogram | |
| 1982 | Ian Wallace | Nion and Company | |
| 1983 | Denis Simpson | Ain't Misbehavin' | |
| 1983 | Brian McKay | March of the Falsettos | |
| 1983 | Morris Panych | Last Call! | |
| 1984 | Brian George | Madeira M'Dear | |
| 1984 | John Hemphill | Waiting for John Doe | |
| 1984 | Blaine Parker | Forbidden Broadway | |
| 1985 | Kimble Hall | The Count of Monte Cristo | |
| 1985 | Paul Dorsey | A Chorus Line | |
| 1985 | Richardo Keens-Douglas | The Obeah Man | |
| 1986 | Victor A. Young | The Desert Song | |
| 1986 | Steven Bush | Bad Apples | |
| 1986 | David Switzer | Half Past the Eighties | |
| 1987 | Eric Donkin | The Mikado | |
| 1987 | Mike Myers | Not Based on Anything by Stephen King | |
| 1987 | Alan Scarfe | The Maske of Comus | |
| 1988 | Neil Foster | Girls in the Gang | |
| 1988 | Dana Andersen | Four Horsemen of the Apocalypse and a Baby | |
| 1988 | Keram Malicki-Sánchez | The Prince and the Pauper | |
| 1989 | Ted Dykstra | Fire | |
| 1989 | Michael Burgess | Les Misérables | |
| 1989 | Michael Riley | Blood Brothers | |

=== 1990s ===
| Year | Actor | Play | Ref |
|---|---|---|---|
| 1990 | Colm Wilkinson | The Phantom of the Opera | |
| 1990 | Jeff Jones | Rigoletto | |
| 1990 | Lonny Price | Durante | |
| 1991 | Gordon Pinsent | Anne of Green Gables | |
| 1991 | Paul Brown | That Scatterbrain Booky | |
| 1991 | Paul Hipp | Buddy: The Buddy Holly Story | |
| 1992 | Richard Greenblatt | God Almighty’s Second-Class Saloon | |
| 1992 | Keith Michell | Aspects of Love | |
| 1992 | Marek Norman | Closer Than Ever | |
| 1993 | Large Theatre | | |
| 1993 | Brent Carver | Kiss of the Spider Woman | |
| 1993 | Benedict Campbell | Ratbag | |
| 1993 | Anthony Crivello | Kiss of the Spider Woman | |
| 1993 | Donny Osmond | Joseph and the Amazing Technicolor Dream Coat | |
| 1993 | Midsize Theatre | | |
| 1993 | Neil Bartram, Paul Castree, John Devorski, Brian Hill | Forever Plaid | |
| 1993 | François Godin | Une soirée avec Jacques Brel | |
| 1993 | Christian Thomas | Une soirée avec Jacques Brel | |
| 1993 | William Vickers | Another Kind of Hero | |
| 1993 | Jonathan Whittaker | Nigredo Hotel | |
| 1994 | Kevin Gray | Miss Saigon | |
| 1994 | Michel Bell | Show Boat | |
| 1994 | Rufus Bonds Jr. | Miss Saigon | |
| 1994 | David Mucci | Crazy for You | |
| 1994 | Jim Walton | Crazy for You | |
| 1995 | Large Theatre | | |
| 1995 | Tyley Ross | Tommy | |
| 1995 | Dan Chameroy | Into the Woods | |
| 1995 | Ted Dykstra | Tommy | |
| 1995 | Frank Moore | Tommy | |
| 1995 | Avery Saltzman | Into the Woods | |
| 1995 | Midsize Theatre | | |
| 1995 | Richard McMillan | Assassins | |
| 1995 | Andrew Currie | Jolly Roger's Cable, or Pirates in Men's Pants | |
| 1995 | Chris Earle | The Old Man's Band | |
| 1995 | Cameron MacDuffee | Assassins | |
| 1995 | Bill Reill | Chess | |
| 1996 | Large Theatre | | |
| 1996 | Dan Chameroy | Beauty and the Beast | |
| 1996 | Juan Chioran | Kiss of the Spider Woman | |
| 1996 | Cliff Saunders | Beauty and the Beast | |
| 1996 | Rex Smith | Sunset Boulevard | |
| 1996 | Chuck Wagner | Beauty and the Beast | |
| 1996 | Midsize Theatre | | |
| 1996 | Jay Turvey | Falsettos | |
| 1996 | John Dolan | Les Fantastiques | |
| 1996 | David Fox | The Barber of Seville | |
| 1996 | Martin Julien | The Barber of Seville | |
| 1997 | Large Theatre | | |
| 1997 | Brian Stokes Mitchell | Ragtime | |
| 1997 | David Cassidy | Blood Brothers | |
| 1997 | Brian Conley | Jolson | |
| 1997 | Anthony Crivello | Jane Eyre | |
| 1997 | Matthew Hargreaves | Don Giovanni | |
| 1997 | Steven Sutcliffe | Ragtime | |
| 1997 | Midsize Theatre | | |
| 1997 | Mark Christmann | The Martha Stewart Projects | |
| 1997 | Diego Matamoros | Still Moon on Fire | |
| 1997 | Jack Mosshammer | Last Tango on Lombard | |
| 1997 | Jack Mosshammer | Tragically OHIP | |
| 1997 | Christopher Peterson | Eyecons | |
| 1998 | Roger Honeywell | The House of Martin Guerre | |
| 1998 | Dean Jones | Show Boat | |
| 1998 | Marcus Nance | Elsewhereless | |
| 1998 | Chad Richardson | Rent | |
| 1998 | Gary Rideout | Hansel & Gretel | |
| 1998 | Michael Schade | Oedpius Rex With Symphony of Psalms | |
| 1999 | Colm Wilkinson | Les Misérables | |
| 1999 | John Blackwood | Sir John, Eh? | |
| 1999 | Russell Braun | The Barber of Seville | |
| 1999 | David Daniels | Xerxes | |
| 1999 | Donato Di Stefano | The Barber of Seville | |
| 1999 | Eugene Fleming | Fosse | |
| 1999 | Richard Margison | Il Trovatore | |

=== 2000s ===
| Year | Actor | Play | Ref |
|---|---|---|---|
| 2000 | Norbert Leo Butz | Cabaret | |
| 2000 | Graham Bickley | The Pajama Game | |
| 2000 | Sylvain Cossette | Notre-Dame de Paris | |
| 2000 | Richard McMillan | The Lion King | |
| 2000 | Gidon Saks | The Flying Dutchman | |
| 2000 | Michael Schade | L'elisir d'amore | |
| 2001 | Russell Braun | Billy Budd | |
| 2001 | Thom Allison | Outrageous! | |
| 2001 | Brent Carver | Larry's Party | |
| 2001 | Stuart Howe | Iron Road | |
| 2001 | Nigel Robson | Billy Budd | |
| 2002 | Damien Atkins | Real Live Girl | |
| 2002 | Graham Abbey | Snow White and the Magnificent Seven | |
| 2002 | Denny Doherty | Dream a Little Dream: The Nearly True Story of the Mamas and the Papas | |
| 2002 | Eddie Glen | Snow White and the Magnificent Seven | |
| 2002 | Tim Howar | Anything That Moves | |
| 2003 | Peter Millard | Little Mercy's First Murder | |
| 2003 | Graham Abbey | Robin Hood | |
| 2003 | Kevin Aichele | A Dixie Gospel | |
| 2003 | George Masswohl | Sweeney Todd | |
| 2003 | Paul McQuillan | Snappy Tales: Short Satirical Musicals | |
| 2004 | Michael Therriault | The Producers | |
| 2004 | Dmitry Chepovetsky | Top Gun! The Musical | |
| 2004 | Réjean Cournoyer | Pélagie | |
| 2004 | Sean Cullen | The Producers | |
| 2004 | Tyley Ross | The Last Five Years | |
| 2004 | Stephen Sparks | Tequila Vampire Matinee | |
| 2005 | David Keeley | Urinetown | |
| 2005 | Jay Brazeau | Hairspray | |
| 2005 | David Lopez | Ain't Misbehavin' | |
| 2005 | Derek McGrath | Aladdin | |
| 2005 | Frank Moore | Urinetown | |
| 2006 | Michael Therriault | Lord of the Rings | |
| 2006 | Richard Binsley | Bunnicula | |
| 2006 | Brent Carver | Lord of the Rings | |
| 2006 | Seán Cullen | Snow White and the Group of Seven | |
| 2006 | Peter Howe | Lord of the Rings | |
| 2007 | Adam Brazier | The Rocky Horror Show | |
| 2007 | Jeffrey Kuhn | The Story of My Life | |
| 2007 | George Masswohl | Seussical | |
| 2007 | Yvan Pedneault | We Will Rock You | |
| 2007 | Ryan Ward | Evil Dead the Musical | |
| 2008 | Ted Dykstra | Fire | |
| 2008 | Keith Cole | Arthouse Cabaret | |
| 2008 | Douglas E. Hughes | A Man of No Importance | |
| 2008 | Ross Petty | Peter Pan | |
| 2008 | Rick Roberts | Fire | |
| 2009 | Jeff Madden | Jersey Boys | |
| 2009 | Jeremy Kushnier | Jersey Boys | |
| 2009 | Richard Lee | The Forbidden Phoenix | |
| 2009 | Michael Lomenda | Jersey Boys | |
| 2009 | Quinn VanAntwerp | Jersey Boys | |

=== 2010s ===
| Year | Actor | Play | Ref |
|---|---|---|---|
| 2010 | Jeff Lillico | The Light in the Piazza | |
| 2010 | Daren A. Herbert | The Toxic Avenger | |
| 2010 | Jeigh Madjus | Altar Boyz | |
| 2010 | Paul McQuillan | Assassins | |
| 2010 | Evan Smith | The Toxic Avenger | |
| 2011 | Tony Sheldon | Priscilla, Queen of the Desert | |
| 2011 | Justin Bott | [title of show] | |
| 2011 | Daren A. Herbert | Parade | |
| 2011 | Allen MacInnis | A Year with Frog and Toad | |
| 2011 | Will Swenson | Priscilla, Queen of the Desert | |
| 2012 | Sterling Jarvis | Caroline, or Change | |
| 2012 | Damien Atkins | Seussical | |
| 2012 | Michael Levinson | Caroline, or Change | |
| 2012 | Jeff Madden | I Love You Because | |
| 2012 | George Masswohl | Seussical | |
| 2013 | Bruce Dow | Of a Monstrous Child | |
| 2013 | Darrin Baker | Falsettos | |
| 2013 | Evan Buliung | Bloodless: The Trial of Burke and Hare | |
| 2013 | Richard Lee | Cinderella | |
| 2013 | Cedric Smith | The Wizard of Oz | |
| 2014 | Damien Atkins | London Road | |
| 2014 | Aiden Glenn | Les Misérables | |
| 2014 | Daren A. Herbert | Once on This Island | |
| 2014 | Ramin Karimloo | Les Misérables | |
| 2014 | Marke Uhre | Les Misérables | |
| 2015 | Daren A. Herbert | The Wild Party | |
| 2015 | Raoul Bhaneja | Life, Death and the Blues | |
| 2015 | Dan Chameroy | The Wild Party | |
| 2015 | Ian Lake | Once | |
| 2015 | Jacob MacInnes | James and the Giant Peach | |
| 2016 | Alan Mingo Jr. | Kinky Boots | |
| 2016 | Graham Scott Fleming | Kinky Boots | |
| 2016 | Jeff Lillico | Grey Gardens | |
| 2016 | Diego Matamoros | Marat/Sade | |
| 2016 | Ron Pederson | One Night Only: The Greatest Musical Never Written | |
| 2017 | Jahlen Barnes | Passing Strange | |
| 2017 | Dan Chameroy | Matilda: The Musical | |
| 2017 | Beau Dixon | Passing Strange | |
| 2017 | Chad Kimball | Come from Away | |
| 2018 | Evan Buliung | Fun Home | |
| 2018 | Dan Chameroy | Life After | |
| 2018 | Jordan Cheng | Mr. Shi and His Lover | |
| 2018 | Josh Epstein | Onegin | |
| 2018 | Derek Kwan | Mr. Shi and His Lover | |
