= Carrie Snyder =

Canadian writer

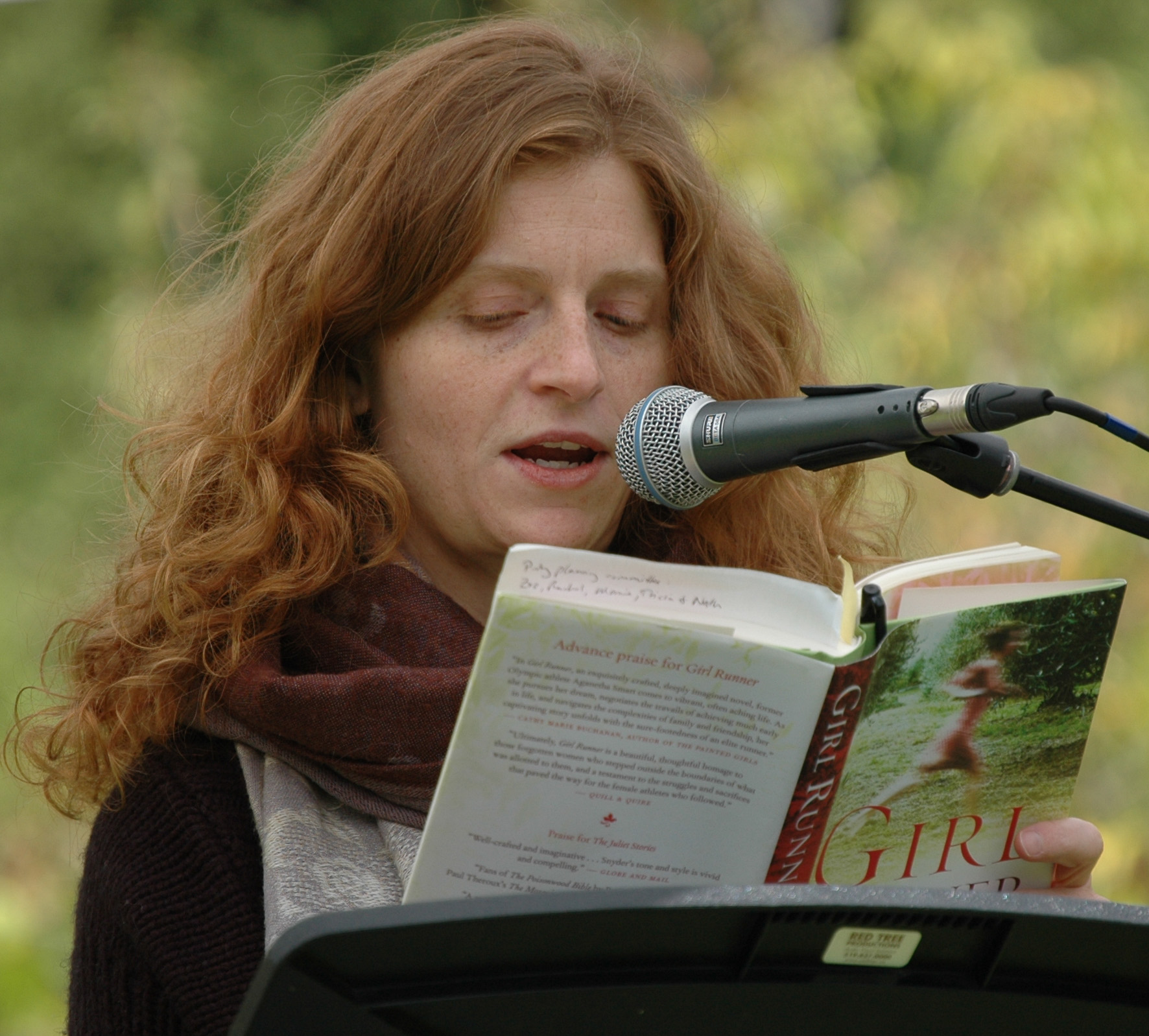
Snyder at the Eden Mills Writers' Festival in 2013

Carrie Snyder is a Canadian writer. Her 2012 short story collection The Juliet Stories was a nominee for the Governor General's Award for English fiction at the 2012 Governor General's Awards. She is also the author of the blog, Obscure Canlit Mama.

In 2014 she published her debut novel Girl Runner. It was inspired by the 1928 Summer Olympics in which women were first allowed to compete in track and field. It was shortlisted for the Rogers Writers' Trust Fiction Prize.

Born in Hamilton, Ontario, she currently lives in Waterloo with her husband, four children and a dog. In 2019 and 2020, along with local art groups, she co-coordinated the X Page storytelling workshop for immigrant and refugee women. She spent part of her childhood living in Nicaragua, which is reflected in The Juliet Stories.

== Works ==
- Hair Hat (2004, ISBN 978-0143015376)
- The Juliet Stories (2012, ISBN 978-1770890022)
- Girl Runner (2014)
- The Candy Conspiracy (2015)
- Jammie Day! (2017)
- Francie's Got a Gun (2022, ISBN 978-0735281912)
