= Portrait-Robot =

French Canadian police drama TV series

- French: Portrait-Robot
- Genre: Thriller; crime fiction; drama
- Created by: Alexis Durand-Brault; Sophie Lorain
- Screenplay by: André Gulluni
- Directed by: Alexis Durand-Brault
- Starring: Rachel Graton; Sophie Lorain; Rémy Girard; Adrien Bélugou
- Country of origin: Canada
- Original languages: French; English
- No. of seasons: 3
- No. of episodes: 10 (list of episodes)

Production
- Producer: Antonello Cozzolino
- Running time: 40–42 mins. (per episode)
- Production companies: ALSO Productions; Quebecor Content

Original release
- Network: Club Illico
- Release: April 15, 2021

Portrait-Robot or The Sketch Artist is a French Canadian television crime drama series, which premiered on Club Illico on April 15, 2021. It was broadcast on Australian network, SBS-TV's streaming service, On Demand, from December 16, 2021. The series was co-created by Sophie Lorain (who also acts) with her spouse, Alexis Durand-Brault (who also directs). The action is set in Montreal, where the titular identikit or forensic sketch artist, Ève Garance (Rachel Graton), profiles both suspects and victims for a police investigation unit. The unit's leader, Maryse Ferron (Lorain) is assisted by veteran detective, Bernard Dupin (Rémy Girard) and rookie crime scene technician, Anthony Kamal (Adrien Bélugou). Major story arcs are generally resolved in two episodes, while background stories continue across more episodes.

In October 2021, Portrait-Robot was renewed for a second season, which aired in January 2023. The third and final season aired in August 2024.

== Premise ==
Ève, a forensic identikit artist, who profiles suspects and victims for a Montreal police unit led by Maryse. Lead detective Bernard also mentors rookie, Anthony, as they analyze crime scenes and question witnesses. Ève submerges herself in people's recollections to create her images. A subtext is the disappearance of Ève's infant son, William, five years ago, coupled with her bipolar condition and the recent return of her ex-husband, James. Meanwhile, Canadian Intelligence hired Bernard to infiltrate the local mafia, which are planning to expand operations. Maryse's brittle bone disease is worsening and her pregnant daughter, Delphine is worried by its inheritability.

== Cast ==
- Rachel Graton as Ève Garance: Montreal forensic sketch artist, diagnosed with bipolar II disorder, which is regulated by medication, her son William disappeared five years ago
- Sophie Lorain as Maryse Ferron: Investigation Unit's leader, wheelchair user with brittle bone disease-like condition
- Rémy Girard as Bernard Dupin: career police officer, unit's lead investigator
- Adrien Bélugou as Anthony "Anto" Kamal (née Ramadés Kamal): recent unit member, crime scene technician, back-up detective
- Brett Donahue as James Healy: Ève's ex-husband, father of William, billionaire businessman who now lives in England, engaged to Laura
- Kathleen Fortin as Elektra Stavros-Poulain: Cyber Crimes investigator, Bernard's casual sex friend.
- Gio Lione as Santo Luciani: Mafia 2nd-in-charge, Bernard's waterfront contact
- Antoine Rivard-Nolin as Xavier Desjardins: uniformed police officer, first-on-scene at William's disappearance, also arrested "Jon-E-Zee"
- Teddy Pluviose as Evans Toussaint: Internal Affairs investigator
- Jean-François Pichette as Patrick Lacenaire: former cyber-security expert and computer programmer, convicted serial killer, born-again Christian
- Martine Francke as Rita Young: Franco-Ontarian widow, Adèle's mother
- Romane Denis as Audrey Sandôme: now 20-year-old pregnant woman, former 12-year-old kidnap and rape victim
- Hubert Proulx as Karl Maublanc: Audrey's father-in-law
- Roch Aubert as Nick Chauvet: retired policeman, suspected pedophile
- Émile Schneider as "Jon-E-Zee"/Jonathan Dareau: YouTuber, fakes his own assault for clickbait
- Irlande Côté as Romane Lever: 10-year-old kidnap victim, rescued by police
- Michel Brouillette as Dr. Pascal Lauzon: gynecologist
- Alex Bisping as Mr Rosenberg: Patrick's lawyer
- Marie Turgeon as Annie Chevalier: former paramedic, later a writer, vlogger
- Rémi Goulet as Gabriel Falco: Patrick's cyber security intern, committed suicide
- Simon Boudreault as Julien Falco: Gabriel's father
- Nazmiye Moutier as Vicky Lacerda: 16-year-old prostitute for Joker, mutilated murder victim
- Lydia Dépeault as Lilou Lacerda: Vicki's 18-year-old sister, fellow prostitute for Joker
- Carla Turcotte as Delphine: Maryse's daughter
- Jean-René Moissan as Philippe Daviau: Belcastel High School counsellor, procures students for Joker's prostitution ring
- Fabrice Yvanoff Sénat as Jean-Christophe Bonnessée or "Joker": local pimp, who brands his prostitutes with Jo/<3® tattoo, 3-5-5 criminal gang leader
- Isabelle Giroux as "Mother of Vicky Lacerda": drug-addled, disinterested mother of Lilou and Vicky
- Camille Felton as Adèle: Rita's daughter, runaway aged 16, joined a cult, Brotherhood of the Dusk
- Robert Lalonde as Michel Lambeau/Robert Hargrave: Robert assumes Michel's identity as an expert on cults and sacred geometry, as Robert he survived when his family completed a cult ritual killing youngsters
- Gaston Lepage as Christophe Marivaux or "Kriss Rambo": sells survival kits and supplies to doomsday preppers and cultists
- Karim Babin as Ziad Nardnashir: towtruck driver, partner of Erika (third shooting victim)
- Anyjeanne Savaria as Cléa Millet: 22-year-old double-homicide victim, shot alongside her boyfriend
- Jules Roy Sicotte as Théo Rivière: 22-year-old double-homicide victim, shot alongside his girlfriend
- Rodger LaRue as Jocelyn Demarais: Ziad's legally blind neighbor
- Antoine Yared as David Brown: James' friend, attended their home on night William disappeared
- Laurent Bélanger as Benjamin Trevor: Cléa's ex-boyfriend, threatened Théo

== Episode guide ==
No. in season	Title	Directed by	Written by	Original release date
1	"Episode 1"	Alexis Durand-Brault	André Gulluni	April 21, 2021
Jon is live-streaming his walk along a lane when he is mugged. Ève talks Jon through his memories, while he describes the attacker. Ève determines that Jon is lying. Anto arrives for his first day with the unit. Upon learning that Romane has been kidnapped, Ève fumbles for her medicine. Maryse details Audrey's kidnapping and escape eight years ago. Ève visits Audrey and Karl's home. Anto and Bernard meet Nick, who bungled Audrey's investigation. Audrey becomes distraught while recalling her kidnapper. When first found, Audrey repeated a word, "carre". Maryse questions Karl to background his relationship with Audrey. Audrey's memories resurfaced when she had a recent ultrasound. Audrey describes her attacker, who sings after raping her. Maryse consoles Ève on William's disappearance anniversary. Anto finds "carre" is a former street name. From street view Anto and Bernard deduce the area where Audrey had been held. At home Ève creates William's annual painting, showing what he could look like. Inside an abandoned building Anto and Bernard find Romane; she is bound but alive.
2	"Episode 2"	Alexis Durand-Brault	André Gulluni	April 28, 2021
Maryse lifts weights to maintain mobility. Bernard phones Maryse that they found Romane. Both Romane and Audrey had been drugged. Audrey sees news footage of the building, she recalls more and shoves Karl out the door. Evidence leads to other possible victims. Ève interviews Romane, who recalls drinking tainted juice in a park, proffered by a man. Audrey is remembering more. Nick was serveilled by Teddy's team and could not have abducted Audrey. Karl's phone records and former work mates provide alibis for the kidnappings. Ève takes Audrey to the room she was held. Audrey remembers more. Ève tells Audrey about William's disappearance. Anto and Bernard ask the building's owner, Yuri about former tenants. Ève interviews both Audrey and Romane, together they recall more about their abductor. Audrey recalls the rapist is her gynecologist, Pascal. Bernard collars Pascal, who is charged with a series of kidnappings and sexual assaults. Anto invites his colleagues to his parents' restaurant. Ève is shocked by James' sudden reappearance inside her flat.
3	"Episode 3"	Alexis Durand-Brault	André Gulluni	May 5, 2021
Bernard did not attend Anto's restaurant. Maryse is displeased by Rosenberg's visit. Patrick wants forgiveness from his 12 victims' families. He confesses to a 13th murder. Maryse is uninterested in Patrick's atonement but starts an investigation for the 13th victim. On behalf of Ève, Bernard finds where James stays. When Patrick was arrested he damaged Maryse's legs, destroying her ability to walk. Anto and Bernard trawl through Patrick's case files. Maryse and Ève visit Patrick in jail, who tries to apologise but Maryse remains silent. Bernard finds Patrick's cellmate, Simon, who relates that the 13th victim, Gabriel, was killed differently. Anto views Annie's vlog; she claims to have survived meeting Patrick. Anto finds images of Annie in case photos. Patrick recalls his 12th victim, he stutters and after a mood shift lunges at Ève. Ève asks if Patrick has verbal apraxia. Patrick claims he has a brain tumour, medulloblastoma. Patrick remembers Gabriel at the 12th victim's murder site and starts describing him. Bernard interviews Annie, who claims to be Patrick's 13th victim. Ève lunches with James, he's in town for his family's investments. Bernard and Anto meet Julien.
4	"Episode 4"	Alexis Durand-Brault	André Gulluni	May 12, 2021
Ève argues with James for abandoning her after William's disappearance. Julien relates how Gabriel had rarely left his room before killing himself using prescription medicine. Patrick phones Maryse, she refuses to forgive him. Anto finds a bible and laptop in Gabriel's effects. Anto deduces Gabriel's laptop has hidden files but he cannot access them. Elektra decrypts Gabriel's stenographic files, which have images of dismembered bodies. Ève is unsure whether Patrick is lying or his tumour is causing memory losses. Maryse asks about James, Ève believes he wants reconciliation. James tells Ève of his engagement. Annie lied about being a victim for book sales. Elektra finds advanced encrypted files on Gabriel's computer. Ève believes Patrick can decrypt them. Gabriel's bible provides the passcode. Patrick was grooming Gabriel to be his accomplice. After Gabriel witnessed Patrick's 12th murder, he ran off. Patrick threatened Gabriel with ruining his family's lives unless Gabriel killed himself. Anto and Bernard tell Julien that they were mistaken about Gabriel's involvement in their investigation. Patrick stabs himself with a crucifix.
5	"Episode 5"	Alexis Durand-Brault	André Gulluni	May 19, 2021
Anto fingerprints a disfigured corpse, Vicky. She has a Jo/<3® tattoo and wears a hearing aid. Maryse's doctor tells her, that she is likely to die within three years. James sees Ève's artworks of William aging each year. Ève asks why was there never a ransom demand for William. Maryse requests Ève's case files. The hearing aid belongs to Philippe. James claims he looked for William after their divorce. Vicky was rammed by a car, while kneeling. Maryse seeks the port's CCTV. Bernard tells Ève William's investigation was done well but thin. Ève views Vicky's corpse to create an image. The pathologist reports the Jo/<3® tattoo on an overdosed prostitute. Philippe says Vicky stole his hearing aid. At a motel, Bernard recognises Lilou, who claims not to know about the murder. Maryse interviews Xavier over William's disappearance. Elektra enhances Ève's software to recompose Vicky's face. Maryse learns Philippe coerced girls to send nudie pics. Maryse warns Anto not to meet near his home; 3-5-5 may find him. Bernard bribes Lilou, she tells him Philippe is Joker's procurer. Ève and James meet for lunch. Bernard meets Santo who tells him all CCTV was deleted. Anto is attacked by two youths.
6	"Episode 6"	Alexis Durand-Brault	André Gulluni	May 26, 2021
Anto describes his assailant to Ève. Elektra gives Ève a contact to find who used her home's security when William disappeared. Bernard arrests Anto's assailant, Olivier, who works for Joker. Ève's software recomposes a workable image of Vicky. Elektra checks traffic CCTV. Vicky's mother tells Bernard that Philippe collected both daughters and gave Vicki her hearing aid. Maryse warns Philippe that his marriage and lifestyle are threatened by Vicky's procurement and death. Bernard lets Ève review his memory of finding Vicky's corpse. He describes the driver, Joker. Joker claims he did not kill Vicky and sends police to Lilou. She was jealous of Vicky who was Joker's current favorite. Vicky wanted to escape but Lilou told Joker where Vicky was hiding. Lilou admits to running Vicky down. Joker drove Lilou away and hid her. Lilou is arrested for murder. Maryse considers stem cell therapy for her condition. Elektra has camera footage from Joker's car, which shows Bernard with Santo. Bernard gives Anto an untraceable gun. Ève receives information from her home's security. Rita, looking for Adèle, knocks on the door of a mansion.
7	"Episode 7"	Alexis Durand-Brault	André Gulluni	June 2, 2021
Rita finds five corpses, hears footsteps and sees someone run past. Ève asks James, why did David arrive when William disappeared? James says he did not know what to do when Ève locked herself in a bedroom. Maryse confronts Bernard about contacting Santo. Bernard fobs her off. Rita asks police to find Adèle. Rita started looking for Adèle, after a frantic phone call. Anto photographs the corpses and surroundings. Ève asks Maryse to see William's case files; she does not trust James. Anto is overcome after seeing a mutilated newborn. Rita remembers the cult's name. Delphine, who is pregnant, wants to know what to expect if her child has Maryse's condition. The corpses downstairs are four men and one young woman but no identities. They died about two weeks earlier. The male baby was sacrificed. Ève notices sacred geometry symbols and Michel's book from Anto's photos. Ève interviews Michel, while Bernard questions Christophe. Christophe claims not to remember the mansion. Michel recognises various symbols and the cult name from a man who wrote to him. He does not recall Robert. Elektra and Bernard share a bottle of ouzo. From its floor plans Anto sees the mansion has another staircase.
8	"Episode 8"	Alexis Durand-Brault	André Gulluni	June 9, 2021
Ève watches footage of herself interviewed after William's disappearance. She chants four colours, grey, azure blue, cherry red and cobalt yellow. Maryse implies to Santo that she knows his relationship to Bernard. Elektra and Bernard have sex. Maryse tells Evans about Bernard's association with Santo. Evans starts an inquiry into Bernard's doings. Anto and Bernard return to the mansion, they find the second staircase. It leads to another corpse; Adèle had died in childbirth. Maryse and Ève talk with cult expert, Carlos. He shows them a 1963 newspaper story about a death cult in Rita's hometown. A boy survivor is Robert. Maryse gives Ève a photo of Robert at 14, Ève uses her computer to age him to 60+. Christophe now claims he saw Adèle picked up by Robert's cultists. While talking to Christophe, Ève recognises Robert was posing as Michel. Robert confesses to kidnapping and letting Adèle die. He then carried out his cult's ritual. Robert escapes justice by poisoning himself. Bernard is suspended as Evans investigates whether he spent any bribe money. A young couple are shot dead by a towtruck driver.
9	"Episode 9"	Alexis Durand-Brault	André Gulluni	June 16, 2021
Bernard tells Ève about re-examining William's case. Bernard concluded that Ève, James and/or David lied. The unit attends the double homicide. Ève tells Evans that Bernard is honest, bribe money not handed in due to corrupt intelligence agents. Bernard leaves his psychologist when she mentions his childhood. Ève tells Bernard that James is returning to London. Erika's murder scene has same bullet casings and same towtruck. Bernard enlists Elektra's help with William's case. Cléa and Théo dated for six months. Anto discovers Benjamin's voicemail kill threat. Erika's partner, Ziad, works for a towing company. Jocelyn tells Ève he heard Ziad's truck arrive before Erika's shooting. A man entered their house and then took their car. Bernard identifies the bullets for Anto. David tells Bernard that James' parents arrived the day after William's disappearance. Benjamin claims the threat was rage but he never acted on it. Anto informs Maryse of fourth victim; news reports a fifth one. Maryse updates Ziad's old photo. James' parents use private jets with no-one checking movements, baggage or accompanies. Maryse asks Evans to reinstate Bernard, they are short staffed. Ziad is found in his car's boot. Bernard confronts James for the truth of William's disappearance.
10	"Episode 10"	Alexis Durand-Brault	André Gulluni	June 13, 2021
Evans tells Bernard to resume regular duties. Xavier tells Anto he should resume using Ramadés. Ziad recalls the driver has a tattoo on his hand and used a Red Pill app. The dead towtruck owner is the sixth victim. Red Pill is used for a dark web hate group. Anto finds kill requests for Ziad, Cléa and Théo. The killer aims to kill a policeman. Benjamin admits to asking to have Cléa and Théo killed but disbelieved it was serious. Xavier is shot dead. Ziad's memory block clears. Ève recognises the image of Youtuber Jon. Xavier had arrested Jon. Elektra says Jon posted that he would kill his ex. Ève goes home for her pills. The unit realizes Jon is pursuing Ève. Bernard stops Ève near her home. Jon points a gun at Bernard and disarms him. Then alternately threatens Bernard and Ève. Anto shoots Jon dead. They fudge the scene to look like suicide. Maryse is dragged off her wheelchair; a shot is fired. Bernard tells Ève had postpartum depression, stopped taking medication, William kept crying. James could no longer cope with her mood swings and was afraid she would harm William. Bernard tells Ève that William is alive.

== Links ==
- IMDB

== See also ==
- Sketch Artist (1992) – TV-movie
- Sketch Artist II: Hands That See (1995)
