= Lisa Pasold =

Canadian poet

Lisa Pasold is a Canadian poet from Montreal. She is most noted for her 2012 poetry collection Any Bright Horse, which was shortlisted for the Governor General's Award for English-language poetry at the 2012 Governor General's Awards.

She has published five books, including her first published poetry collections Weave (2004). Included in that list is A Bad Year for Journalists (2006), which was nominated for an Alberta Book Award and turned into a theatre piece the following year, premiering in Toronto, the novel Rats of Las Vegas (2009), as well as her most recent book The Riparian (2017), from Frontenac House, Calgary.Her writing has appeared in a wide range of newspapers, magazines and anthologies including The Chicago Tribune, The National Post, Billboard, The Los Angeles Review, The Georgia Review, New American Writing, and 100 Poets Against the War (2003).

She is the creator of the podcast Improbable Walks, about story-telling art walks surrounding legends and place memory created to commend festivals and gallery residencies in cities such as New Orleans, Saskatoon, and Paris. She is also the host and co-writer of Discovery World’s TV travel series "Paris Next Stop” (2007-2013).
