= Mishka Lavigne =

Canadian playwright

Mishka Lavigne is a Canadian playwright. She is a two-time winner of the Governor General's Award for French-language drama, for Havre at the 2019 Governor General's Awards and for Copeaux at the 2021 Governor General's Awards.

A graduate of the University of Ottawa, she was the first writer based outside of Quebec to win a GG in the drama category since Emma Haché in 2004.

She was one of the winners, alongside Christophe Bernard, of the Prix Québec-Ontario from the Salon du livre de Toronto in 2017 for her first published play, Cinéma.

Her English-language play Shorelines was shortlisted for the Governor General's Award for English-language drama at the 2024 Governor General's Awards, making her the first person nominated for both the English and French versions of the award.
