= Prix Gratien-Gélinas =

Canadian theatre prize honoring original scripts

The Prix Gratien-Gélinas, originally known as Prime à la création du Fonds Gratien-Gélinas, is a Canadian theatre prize awarded for an original script with the aim of helping bring it to the stage. It was first awarded in 1994. It is presented by the Centre des auteurs dramatiques du Québec with the financial support of Quebecor, Cirque du Soleil and Ici Radio-Canada. Named in honour of Gratien Gélinas, it is considered the most important Canadian award recognizing emerging talent in francophone playwriting.

== Winners ==
- 1994 - Règlement de contes, Yvan Bienvenue & Une tache sur la lune, Marie-Line Laplante (tie)
- 1995 - Motel Hélène, Serge Boucher
- 1997 - Couteau... Sept façons originales de tuer quelqu'un avec, Isabelle Hubert
- 1998 - Dévoilement devant le notaire, Dominick Parenteau-Lebeuf
- 1999 - Floes, Sébastien Harrisson
- 2000 - Ceci n'est pas une pipe, Stéphane Hogue
- 2001 - Le pays des genoux, Geneviève Billette
- 2002 - 2025, l'année du Serpent, Philippe Ducros
- 2003 - L'intimité, Emma Haché
- 2004 - Le doux parfum du vide, Pascal Lafond
- 2005 - Je suis d'un would be pays, François Godin
- 2006 - Voiture américaine, Catherine Léger
- 2007 - Buffet chinois, Nathalie Boisvert
- 2008 - Transmissions, Justin Laramée
- 2009 - Le chant de Georges Boivin, Martin Bellemare
- 2010 - Faire des enfants, Éric Noël
- 2011 - Billy (Les jours de hurlement), Fabien Cloutier
- 2013 - La beauté du monde, Olivier Sylvestre
- 2013 - L'écolière de Tokyo, Jean-Philippe Lehoux
- 2014 - Danserault, Jonathan Bernier
- 2015 - Hamster, Marianne Dansereau
- 2016 - Histoire populaire et sensationnelle, Gabriel Plante
- 2017 - La nuit du 4 au 5, Rachel Graton
- 2018 - Une journée, Gabrielle Chapdelaine
- 2019 - L'art de vivre, Liliane Gougeon Moisan
