= James Long (director) =

Canadian playwright and theatre director

James Long is a Canadian playwright and theatre director, most noted as the artistic co-director of the Theatre Replacement company in Vancouver, British Columbia.

He was co-writer with Marcus Youssef of the play Winners and Losers, which was shortlisted for the Dora Mavor Moore Award for Best Original Play, General Theatre in 2014, and the Governor General's Award for English-language drama at the 2015 Governor General's Awards.

He and Maiko Yamamoto, his partner in Theatre Replacement, jointly won the Siminovitch Prize in Theatre in 2019.
