= Albertine in Five Times =

Albertine in Five Times (French: Albertine, en cinq temps) is a play by Michel Tremblay. First produced by the National Arts Centre in 1984, it has gone on to become one of Tremblay's most widely produced plays in both its original French and translated English versions.

The play centres on Albertine, who appeared as a minor or supporting character in several of Tremblay's other works. In the play, the 70-year-old Albertine interacts with her younger selves at the ages of 30, 40, 50 and 60, dramatizing her interior monologue as she reflects on her life after moving into a retirement home. Apart from the five Albertines, the only other character who appears in the play is her sister Madeleine.

The original production in 1984 starred Huguette Oligny, Gisèle Schmidt, Amulette Garneau, Rita Lafontaine, Muriel Dutil and Paule Marier, and was directed by André Brassard. The play was a shortlisted nominee for the Governor General's Award for French-language drama at the 1984 Governor General's Awards.

The first English production, by Tarragon Theatre in 1985, starred Susan Coyne, Patricia Hamilton, Susan Wright, Clare Coulter, Joy Coghill and Doris Petrie. The original translation was done by Bill Glassco and John Van Burek. This production won a Floyd S. Chalmers Canadian Play Award in 1986.

The first time the play was performed in Montreal in English was also in 1985 at the Centaur Theatre. The cast featured Joan Orenstein, Gwynyth Walsh and Nonnie Griffin, among others.

A 1995 production of the play for Montreal's Théâtre Espace Go starred Monique Mercure as Albertine at 70, Andrée Lachapelle as Albertine at 60, Sophie Clément as Albertine at 50, Élise Guilbault as Albertine at 40, Sylvie Drapeau as Albertine at 30 and Guylaine Tremblay as Madeleine. This production was later filmed as a television film directed by André Melançon, with Macha Limonchik replacing Drapeau as the youngest Albertine but all other roles played by the same actresses. The film aired on the Télévision de Radio-Canada arts anthology series Les Beaux Dimanches in 2000.

A Clyde Unity Theatre production of a translation into contemporary Scots by Bill Findlay and Martin Bowman played at the Tron Theatre in Glasgow in March 1998. The cast of respected Scottish actresses, including Eileen McCallum, Una McLean and Alison Peebles was directed by John Binnie.

A new English translation by Linda Gaboriau was commissioned by the Shaw Festival in 2009.
