= Mathieu Gosselin =

Canadian actor and playwright

Mathieu Gosselin is a Canadian actor and playwright from Quebec. He is most noted for his play Gros gars, which was the winner of the Governor General's Award for French-language drama at the 2023 Governor General's Awards.
