= Addena Sumter-Freitag =

Canadian writer and performer

Addena Sumter-Freitag is a Canadian author, poet, performer and speaker. She grew up in Winnipeg, Manitoba.

Sumter-Freitag has performed her one-woman play Stay Black & Die across Canada and in Australia since 1995. It won Best Production at the Montreal Fringe Festival, and was published by Commodore Books in 2007. In 2009, Wattle and Daub Books published her collection of poems, Back in the Days. Canadian Literature called the latter a "memorably intimate journey, relating her experiences growing up as a black girl in Winnipeg's North End in the 1950s" and noted that "Sumter-Freitag's will undoubtedly become one of the most prominent poetic voices of Canada's Black community."

Sumter-Freitag is a seventh generation African Canadian.

== Bibliography ==
=== Drama ===
- Stay Black & Die (2007)

=== Poetry ===
- Back in the Days (2009)
