= Anne Legault =

Canadian actress, writer and educator

Anne Legault (born July 7, 1958) is a Quebec actor, writer and educator.

She was born in Lachine and studied at the Conservatoire d'art dramatique de Montréal. Legault performed in children's theatre and on television before she began writing in 1984. Between 1984 and 1994, six of her plays were produced in theatres in Montreal. She received the Governor General's Award for French-language drama in 1986 for her play La Visite des sauvages.

English translations of two of her plays O'Neill and Alma and Mrs Woolf : An Imaginary Encounter were produced in New York City.

== Selected works ==
- Les ailes ou La maison cassée (1985)
- Signer (1988), about the people who signed the Refus Global manifesto
- O'Neill (1990), about playwright Eugene O'Neill
- Conte d'hiver '70 (1992), about the October Crisis
- La balance (1996), based on Shakespeare's play Henry V
- La mémoire de Rhéa (1994)
- Une fille pas comme les autres, youth novel (1997), illustrated by Leanne Franson
