= David Paquet =

Canadian playwright (born 1978)

- Born: 1978
- Occupation: playwright
- Writing career
- Period: 2000s-present
- Notable work: Porc-épic

David Paquet is a Canadian playwright, who won the Governor General's Award for French-language drama at the 2010 Governor General's Awards, and the Prix Michel-Tremblay, for his play Porc-épic.

His other plays have included 2h14, Appels entrants illimités, Le brasier and Papiers mâchés.

He is a graduate of the National Theatre School of Canada.

He won a second Governor General's Award for drama at the 2022 Governor General's Awards for Le poids des fourmis.
