= Olivier Kemeid =

Canadian playwright and theatre director

- Born: 1975 (age 50–51); Montreal, Quebec, Canada
- Occupation: playwright
- Writing career
- Period: 2000s-present
- Notable works: L'Éneide, Moi, dans les ruines rouges du siècle, Furieux et désespérés

Olivier Kemeid (born 1975 in Montreal) is a Canadian playwright and theatre director from Quebec. He is a three-time nominee for the Governor General's Award for French-language drama, for L'Éneide at the 2009 Governor General's Awards, for Moi, dans les ruines rouges du siècle at the 2014 Governor General's Awards and for Five Kings : l'histoire de notre chute at the 2016 Governor General's Awards.

Born in Montreal to immigrant parents from Egypt, Kemeid studied political science and philosophy at university before attending the National Theatre School of Canada to study playwrighting. He has been associated with several theatre companies in Quebec, including the Théâtre du Trident in Quebec City, Trois Tristes Tigres and Espace Libre, and has written radio plays for Radio-Canada.

His other plays have included Chroniques de l'insouciance (2001), Barthélémy chez le Très-Bas (2002), Déserteurs (2002), Nous qui ne rêvions plus (2003), L'Homme des derniers instants (2003), Les Mains (2004), Les Murmures (2004), Une ardente patience (2005), Rabelais (Festin) (2005), Tout ce qui est debout se couchera (2006), Bacchanale (2008) and Furieux et désespérés (2013).

In 2016, Kemeid became the artistic director of the Théâtre de Quat'Sous in Montreal.
