= Hoda Adra =

Hoda Adra is a Lebanese Canadian writer, based in Montreal, Quebec. She is most noted for her theatrical monologue L'histoire de comment je me suis séparée en deux, which was the winner of the Governor General's Award for French-language drama at the 2026 Governor General's Awards.
