= Rachel Graton =

Canadian playwright and actress

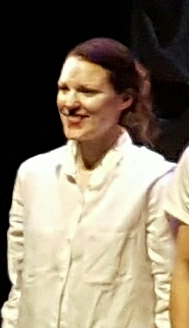
- A picture of Rachel Graton standing on a stage.
- Born: August 29, 1985 (age 40); Canada
- Occupations: Playwright and actress
- Years active: 2011-present
- Known for: Suzanne et Chantal; Coeur vintage; The Sketch Artist (Portrait - Robot)

Rachel Graton (born August 29, 1985) is a Canadian playwright and actress from Quebec. She is most noted for her play La nuit du 4 au 5, which won the Prix Gratien-Gélinas in 2017 and was shortlisted for the Governor General's Award for French-language drama at the 2019 Governor General's Awards.

As an actress, she has appeared in the films Miraculum, It's the Heart That Dies Last (C'est le cœur qui meurt en dernier), Ghost Town Anthology (Répertoire des villes disparues), Tell Me Why These Things Are So Beautiful (Dis-moi pourquoi ces choses sont si belles) and François.e, and the television series Trauma, Karl & Max, Boomerang, Au secours de Béatrice, Les Simone and Portrait-Robot (2021).
