= Jean Basile =

Canadian writer (born 1932)

- Born: 1932; Paris, France
- Died: February 10, 1992 (aged 59–60)
- Occupation: novelist
- Writing career
- Period: 1960s-1980s
- Notable works: La Jument des mongols, Le Grand Khan, Les Voyages d'Irkoutsk

Jean Basile was the pen name of Jean Basile Bezroudnoff (January 5, 1932 – February 10, 1992), a French-born Canadian journalist and novelist from Quebec. A key figure in the underground counterculture of Montreal in the 1960s and 1970s, he is most noted for his "Mongol" trilogy of novels, La Jument des mongols, Le Grand Khan and Les Voyages d'Irkoutsk, and for cofounding the counterculture magazine Mainmise.

Born in Paris, France to a Russian immigrant father and a French mother on January 5, 1932, he moved to Montreal in 1960.

== Career ==
He joined Le Devoir as an arts and literary critic in 1962. He left the paper in 1970, founding Mainmise with Georges Khal and Christian Allègre in 1970, before rejoining Le Devoir in 1973.

La Jument des mongols, the first novel in his Mongol trilogy, was published in 1964. It was followed by Le Grand Khan in 1967 and Les Voyages d'Irkoutsk in 1970. Basile was a gay man, and the novels were noted for being among the first in Quebec literary history to openly address homosexuality. In an early issue of Mainmise, he also called for the creation of a gay liberation movement in Montreal.

Some of his other works, including Coca et cocaine and La Culture du canabis, addressed drug culture. He also wrote Joli Tambour, a historical drama play about the first hangman in New France.

He became director of the Éditions de l'Aurore publishing house in 1976, and later established his own publishing company, Les Éditions Jean Basile, in 1979. He joined La Presse in 1984.

He died in 1992 in Montreal.

== Works ==
- Lorenzo (1963)
- La Jument des mongols (1964)
- Journal poétique, 1964-1965: Élégie pour apprendre à vivre suivie de Pièces brèves (1965)
- Joli Tambour (1966)
- Le Grand Khan (1967)
- Les Voyages d'Irkoutsk (1970)
- L'Écriture radio-télé (1976)
- Coca et cocaine (1977)
- La Culture du canabis (1979)
- Le Piano-trompette (1983)
- Iconostase pour Pier-Paolo Pasolini (1984)
- Adieu... je pars pour Viazma! (1987)
- Keepsake 1 (1992)
