= Yvan Bienvenue =

Canadian writer

Yvan Bienvenue (born August 14, 1962) is a Quebec writer.

The son of Émilia Lemaire and Rolland Bienvenue, he was born in Saint-Hyacinthe and studied play-writing at the National Theatre School of Canada. In 1992, with Stéphane Jacques, he founded the Théâtre Urbi et Orbi. In 1996, with Claude Champagne, Bienvenue founded the publishing house Dramaturges Éditeurs, which specializes in publishing plays by Canadian authors. He has also translated several plays by English playwrights into French.

Bienvenue published his first play Déphase nuit in 1984. His two plays Lettre d'amour pour une amante inavouée and In vitro were published as Histoires à mourir d'amour in 1994; this collection of plays was a finalist for a Governor General's Award. His play Règlement de contes (1995) received the Prix Gratien-Gélinas. His collection of so-called "urban tales" Dits et Inédits received the Governor General's Award for French-language drama in 1997. His play La vie continue appeared on the shortlist for the Governor General's Award in 2008.

In 1996, he organized a five night theatrical event 38, where 38 playwrights under the age of 38 each wrote a monologue based on one of William Shakespeare's plays. The performance was broadcast live on Radio-Canada.

== Selected works ==
- Les Foufs, short play
- Joyeux Noël Julie, short play
- Le lit de mort, play (1999)
- Tout être, poetry (2002)
- Bill 101, play (2004)
