= Jessica Warner =

American historian

Jessica Warner is an American historian, specializing in the social history of Great Britain in the early modern age. Her books include Craze: Gin and Debauchery in an Age of Reason and The Incendiary: The Misadventures of John the Painter, First Modern Terrorist. The latter book has won praise from fellow historians like Simon Schama and Brenda Maddox.

Warner was born and raised in Washington, DC. She is a graduate of Princeton University and Yale University. She currently teaches at the University of Toronto.
