= Anne-Marie Olivier =

Canadian actress and playwright

Anne-Marie Olivier (born 1973) is a Canadian stage actress and playwright from Quebec, who won the Governor General's Award for French-language drama for her play Venir au monde at the 2018 Governor General's Awards.

The artistic director of Théâtre Le Trident, she was named Artist of the Year for 2018 by Le Soleil and the Société Radio-Canada.

== Plays ==
- Boa Constrictor - 2005
- Gros et détail - 2005
- Le Psychomaton - 2007
- Regards-9 (Un jeudi soir à l'espo) - 2008
- 7 péchés, quand le musée parle au Diable! - 2009
- Mon corps deviendra froid - 2011
- Annette - 2012
- S'appartenir(e) - 2015
- Faire l'amour - 2016
- Venir au monde - 2018
