= Jean-Rock Gaudreault =

Canadian playwright (born 1972)

- Born: 1972 (age 53–54); Jonquière, Quebec
- Occupation: writer
- Writing career
- Genre: drama
- Notable work: Deux pas vers les étoiles

Jean-Rock Gaudreault (born 1972 in Jonquière, Quebec) is a Canadian playwright. He won the Governor General's Award for French-language drama at the 2003 Governor General's Awards for Deux pas vers les étoiles, and was a shortlisted nominee at the 2005 Governor General's Awards for Pour ceux qui croient que la Terre est ronde and at the 2015 Governor General's Awards for Jouez, Monsieur Molière!.

His other plays have included La Raccourcie, La Maladie fantastique, Une maison face au nord, Comment parler de Dieu à un enfant pendant que le monde pleure and Mathieu trop court, François trop long.

He is a graduate of the National Theatre School of Canada.
