= Émilie Monnet =

Canadian multidisciplinary artist and playwright

Émilie Monnet is a Canadian multidisciplinary artist and playwright. She is most noted for her theatrical piece Okinum, which won the 2021 Indigenous Voices Award for French Prose, and was shortlisted for the Governor General's Award for French-language drama at the 2021 Governor General's Awards. Monnet was also a nominee for the Governor General's Award for French to English translation at the 2023 Governor General's Awards for her English-language version of Okinum.

She is the older sister of artist and filmmaker Caroline Monnet.
