= Olivier Sylvestre =

Canadian writer from Quebec (born 1982)

- Born: 1982; Laval, Quebec, Canada
- Occupations: author, dramatic adviser, translator
- Writing career
- Language: French
- Notable works: La beauté du monde; La loi de la gravité; Nom fictifs

Olivier Sylvestre (born 1982 in Laval, Quebec) is a Canadian writer from Quebec. He is most noted for his first theatrical play La beauté du monde, which won the Prix Gratien-Gélinas and was a shortlisted finalist for the Governor General's Award for French-language drama at the 2015 Governor General's Awards, and his short story collection, Noms fictifs, which was a shortlisted finalist for the Governor General's Award for French-language fiction at the 2018 Governor General's Awards.

== Biography ==
Sylvestre holds a bachelor's degree in criminology, and a diploma in playwriting from the National Theatre School of Canada. He was translated into English by Leanna Brodie. His monologue Le désert was premiered in January 2018 at Théâtre Prospero in a production by Le Dôme – creations théâtrales, a company Sylvestre co-leads. His play La loi de la gravité, Éditions Passages(s), has won numerous awards in Europe and was translated into English by Bobby Theodore. He has translated several plays by Canadian playwrights, Jesse Stong's You Can Do Whatever You Want and Waawaate Fobister's Agokwe.

His other plays have included Guide d’éducation sexuelle pour le nouveau millénaire.

His play La loi de la gravité was translated into German as Das Gesetz der Schwerkraft by Sonja Finck (Gatineau) and performed at the Theaterfestival Primeur in Saarbrücken in 2016.

== Works ==
- Nom fictifs. Roman. Hamac, Quebec 2017

== Electoral record ==
2026 Quebec general election: Westmount–Saint-Louis
** Preliminary results — Not yet official **
Party	Candidate	Votes	%	±%
Liberal	Jennifer Maccarone	14,532	59.89	
Québec solidaire	Olivier Sylvestre	3,729	15.37	
Conservative	Guy Diotte	2,483	10.23	
Parti Québécois	Victoria Piscina	1,801	7.42	
Coalition Avenir Québec	Karim Abi Haila	816	3.36	
Green	Hailey Roop	432	1.78	
Canadian	Maryam Kamali Nezhad	290	1.20	
Communist	Kaity Zozula	107	0.44	
Parti nul	Marc A. Lefebvre	74	0.30	
Total valid votes				
Total rejected ballots				
Turnout			45.98	
Electors on the lists			–	–
Liberal hold		Swing		
Source: Élections Québec
