= Emma Haché =

Canadian writer of Acadian descent

Emma Haché is a Canadian writer of Acadian descent.

She was born in Lamèque, New Brunswick on November 25, 1979, and studied theatre at the Université de Moncton. She moved to Montreal and continued her studies there at Omnibus, at the École de Mime Corporel and the Centre de création scénique. Her first play Lave tes mains (2002) received the Prix littéraire Antonine-Maillet-Acadie Vie (youth category). She received the Prix Gratien-Gélinas in 2003 for L'intimité, which was also awarded the Governor General's Award for French-language drama. Her play Trafiquée was a finalist for a Governor General's Award in 2010 and received the Prix littéraire Antonine-Maillet-Acadie-Vie.
