= Daniel Danis =

Canadian playwright

David Paquet
- Occupation: playwright
- Writing career
- Period: 2000s–present
- Notable work: Porc-épic

Daniel Danis (born 1962 in Hawkesbury, Ontario) is a Canadian playwright. He is a three-time winner of the Governor General's Award for French-language drama, receiving the award at the 1993 Governor General's Awards for Celle-là, at the 2002 Governor General's Awards for Le Langue-à-Langue des chiens de roche and at the 2007 Governor General's Awards for Le chant du Dire-Dire.

His other plays have included Cendres de cailloux, Les nuages de terre, Le pont de pierres et la peau d'images, Terre océane, Mille anonymes, Sous un ciel de chamaille, Kiwi and Bled.

Although born in Ontario, he grew up primarily in Quebec. He studied theatre at the Conservatoire d'art dramatique in Quebec City.
