= John Murrell (playwright) =

American-born Canadian playwright (1945–2019)

John Murrell, OC, AOE (October 15, 1945 – November 11, 2019) was an American-born Canadian playwright.

== Life and career ==
Born in Lubbock, Texas, Murrell moved to Alberta after graduating from Southwestern University in Georgetown, Texas with a BFA in 1968. He moved to Canada to avoid the draft, studying at the University of Calgary. In 2002, he was made an Officer of the Order of Canada and awarded the Alberta Order of Excellence. In 2008, he received the Governor General's Performing Arts Award for Lifetime Artistic Achievement, Canada's highest honour in the performing arts, for which he was the subject of a National Film Board of Canada animated short by Cam Christiansen entitled The Real Place.

Murrell also translated some Russian and French works.

== Original plays by John Murrell ==
- Haydn's Head (1974)
- Power in the Blood (1975)
- Waiting for the Parade (1977)
- Memoir (1977)
- Farther West (1982)
- New World (1984)
- October (1988)
- Democracy (1991)
- The Faraway Nearby (1994)
- Death in New Orleans (1998)
- Taking Shakespeare (2012)

== Translations/adaptations by John Murrell ==
- Mandragola (after Machiavelli) (1978)
- Uncle Vanya (after Chekhov) (1978)
- Bajazet (after Racine) (1979)
- The Seagull (after Chekhov) (1980)
- Divorcons (after Sardou) (1983)
- The Master Builder (after Ibsen) (1983)
- Oedipus the King (after Sophocles) (1988)
- The Four Lives of Marie (after Carole Frechette) (1996)
- The Cherry Orchard (after Chekhov) (1998)
- The Odyssey (after Homer) (2001)
- The Doll House (after Ibsen) (2001)
- The Human Voice (after Jean Cocteau) (2004)
