= Fabien Cloutier =

Canadian actor and playwright

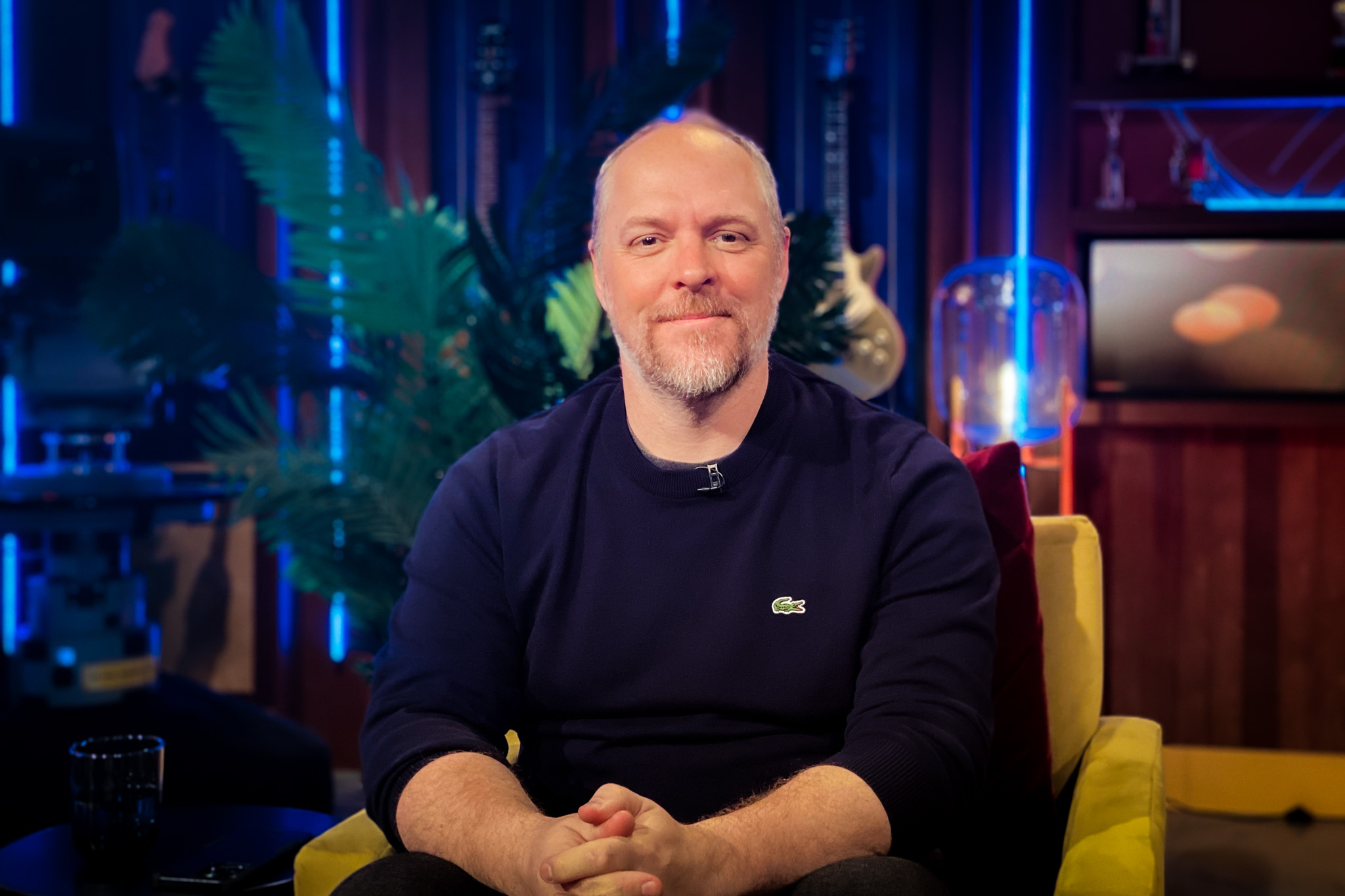
- Born: December 15, 1975 (age 50); Sainte-Marie-de-Beauce, Quebec
- Occupations: writer, actor
- Writing career
- Genre: drama
- Notable works: Pour réussir un poulet, Billy (Les jours de hurlement), Cranbourne, Scotstown
- Website: fabiencloutier.com

Fabien Cloutier is a Canadian actor and playwright from Quebec. He is best known for his play Pour réussir un poulet, which won the Governor General's Award for French language drama at the 2015 Governor General's Awards. He was previously shortlisted for the same award at the 2012 Governor General's Awards, and won the Prix Gratien-Gélinas in 2011, for Billy (Les jours de hurlement).

His other plays include Scotstown, Cranbourne, and La guerre des tuques.

As an actor, he performs primarily on stage, although he had a notable early television role in the series Watatatow, and starred in the 2024 film Vile & Miserable (Vil & Misérable).

== Works ==
- Oùsqu'y é Chabot? [2005].
- Scotstown [2008]. Translated into English by David Laurin, and into German by Frank Weigand.
- Cranbourne [2011].
- Billy (Les jours de hurlement) [2011]. Translated into English by Nadine Desrochers as Billy (The Days of Howling), and into German by Frank Weigand as Billy (brüllende Tage).
- La guerre des tuques [2013].
- Pour réussir un poulet [2014]. Translated into English by Marie-Claude Plourde (How to Bake the Perfect Chicken).
