= Carole Fréchette =

Canadian playwright

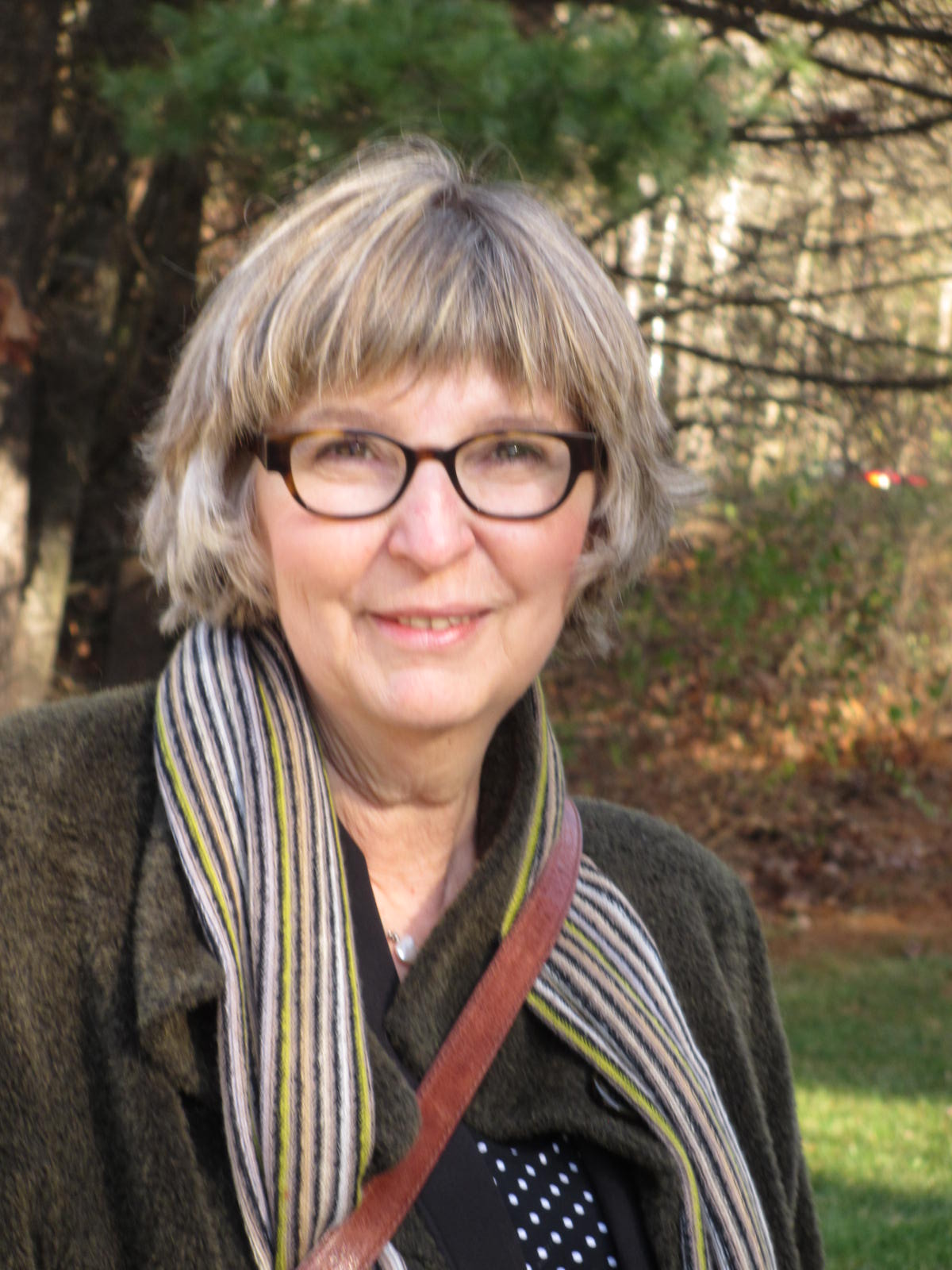
- Born: 1949 (age 76–77); Montreal, Quebec, Canada
- Occupation: Playwright
- Writing career
- Genre: Drama,
- Notable works: Thinking of Yu, Small Talk
- Website: carolefrechette.com

Carole Fréchette (born 1949) is a Canadian playwright. She won the Siminovitch Prize in 2002. To date she has written more than a dozen plays including The Four Lives of Marie, The Seven Days of Simon Labrosse, Helen's Necklace, John and Beatrice, The Little Room at the Top of the Stairs, and most recently: Thinking of Yu.

== Career ==
Fréchette studied acting at the National Theatre School of Canada from 1970 to 1973. She became involved in political and feminist theatre as well as collective writing which was flourishing at that time in Quebec. In 1974, she joined the feminist theatre group called the Theatre des cuisines (Kitchen Theatre Group) and participated in three productions: Nous aurons les enfants que nous voulons, Moman travaille pas, a trop d'ouvrage and As-tu vu ? Les maisons s'emportent! It was in this context that she began writing for the theatre, as part of a group effort by the women involved.

The Kitchen Theatre experiment came to an end in the early 1980s and Fréchette undertook graduate studies in dramatic arts at the Université du Québec à Montréal. It was there that she wrote her first single-authored play:Baby Blues which was staged in 1989 at the Theatre d'Aujourd'hui (principal playhouse for contemporary Quebec writers in Montreal). Her second play, The Four Lives of Marie, translated by John Murrell and published by Playwrights Canada Press, won the Governor General's Award for French-language drama in 1995. This play constituted a turning point in Fréchette's career as a playwright. It was first produced in English in Toronto, Ontario, in 1997 and then in French in Montreal and Paris in 1998. The same year, her third play, Elisa's Skin was staged in Montreal. This was immediately followed by The Seven Days of Simon Labrosse which saw productions in Canada, Belgium and France.

Since then, Fréchette's work has continued unabated (five more full-length plays and numerous short plays). She has been translated into over twenty languages and is presented to audiences the world over. She has also written two novels for young adults Carmen and In the Key of Do, which have also been translated into several languages. Her work has won several prizes, in Canada and abroad. Many of her plays have been broadcast over the radio in France, Belgium, Switzerland and Germany. The Seven Days of Simon Labross and John and Beatrice were adapted for television. Fréchette has also been active in the theatre world in Quebec. From 1994 to 1999, she was president of the "Centre des auteurs dramatiques", a professional association of playwrights devoted to promoting French language Quebec theatre.

== Plays published in English ==
- Fréchette, Carole. (2002). Three Plays. [The Four Lives of Marie, Elisa's Skin, Seven Days in the Life of Simon Labrosse].Translated by John Murrell. Playwrights Canada Press, Toronto. ISBN 9780887546297
- Fréchette, Carole. (2005). Two Plays. [John and Beatrice – Helen's Necklace]. Translated by John Murrell. Playwrights Canada Press, Toronto. ISBN 9780887545016
- Fréchette, Carole. (2010). Earthbound. Translated by John Murrell. In FORSYTH, Louise H., Anthology of Quebec Women's Plays in English Translation Vol. 3, 2004–2008, Playwrights Canada Press, Toronto. ISBN 9780887547850
- Fréchette, Carole. (2012). The Small Room at the Top of the Stairs & Thinking of Yu. Translated by John Murrell. Playwrights Canada Press, Toronto. ISBN 9781770910560

== Publications in original French ==
=== Theatre ===
- Baby Blues, Éditions les Herbes Rouges, Montréal, 1989.
- Les Quatre morts de Marie, Éditions Actes Sud- Papiers, Paris, 1998.
- La peau d'Élisa. Éditions Leméac/ Actes Sud - Papiers, Montréal et Paris, 1998.
- Les sept jours de Simon Labrosse. Éditions Leméac /Actes-Sud Papiers, Montréal et Paris, 1999.
- Le collier d'Hélène. Éditions Lansman, Carnières, 2002.
- Violette sur la terre. Éditions Leméac-Actes-Sud Papiers, Montréal et Paris, 2002.
- Jean et Béatrice. Éditions Leméac- Actes-Sud Papiers, Montréal et Paris, 2002.
- Route 1 (pièce courte), in Fragments d'humanité. Éditions Lansman, Carnières, 2004.
- La Pose (pièce courte), in La Famille. Éditions de L'avant-scène – La Comédie Française, Paris, 2007.
- La petite pièce en haut de l'escalier. Éditions Leméac/Actes-Sud Papiers, Montréal et Paris, 2008.
- Sérial Killer et autres pièces courtes. Éditions Leméac/Actes-Sud Papiers, Montréal et Paris, 2008.
- Entrefilet, Éditions Leméac/Actes-Sud Papiers, Montréal et Paris, 2012.
- Je pense à Yu, Éditions Leméac/Actes-Sud Papiers, Montréal et Paris, 2012

=== Fiction ===
- Portrait de Doris en jeune fille, Nouvelle, in Qui a peur de ?..., VLB Éditeur, Montréal 1987.
- Carmen en fugue mineure. Éditions de la courte échelle, Montréal, 1996 (roman pour la jeunesse)
- Do pour Dolorès. Éditions de la courte échelle, Montréal, 1999 (roman pour la jeunesse)

== Translations in other languages ==
=== Theatre ===
Les quatre morts de Marie

- Spanish translation by Mauricio Garcia Lozano, 1998 (Mexico)
- Romanian translation by Mircea Ivanescu, 1998
- German translation by Andreas Jandl, 2000

La peau d'Élisa

- German translation by Andreas Jandl, 2001
- Arabic translation by Joseph Kodeih
- Spanish translation by Daniela Berlante, Éditions Norte+Sur - Bajo la Luna, Buenos Aires, 2004.
- Russian translation by Nina Khotinskaya, dans Inostrannaya literatura, Moscou, 2008.

Les sept jours de Simon Labrosse

- Romanian translation by Aurel Stefanescu, dans Musele Orfane, dramaturgie québechezã, Teatru de ieri si de azi, seria : Teatru Francofon, Éditura Vittorul Românesc, Bucarest, 2003.
- German translation by Hans Schwarzinger, Felix Bloch Erben Verlag, 2005
- Portuguese translation by João Lourenço et Vera San Payo de Lemos, 2006
- Hungarian translation by Pal Kurucz, 2002

Le collier d'Hélène

- German translation by Andreas Jandl, 2003.
- Portuguese translation by Rodrigo Francisco, 2006.
- Japanese translation by Toyoshi Yoshihara, 2007.
- Lithuanian translation by Rasa Vasinauskaite, 2007.
- Russian translation by Natalie Prosuntsova, 2007.
- Icelandic translation by Hrafnhildur Hagalin Gudmundsdottir, 2007.
- Greek translation by Maria Efstathiadi, 2009.

Violette sur la Terre

- Greek translation by Dimitri Filias, 2011.

Jean et Béatrice

- Spanish translation by Mauricio Garcia Lozano, 2002.
- Italian translation by Julia Serafini, 2001.
- Russian translation by Nina Chotinsky, dans Sovremennaja Dramaturgija nº 2, Moscou, avril-juin 2004.
- German translation by Heinz Schwarzinger. Éditions Felix Bloch Erben Verlag, 2006.
- Lithuanian translation by Aleksandras Robinovas, 2007.
- Armenian translation by Lusine Yernjakyan, 2007.
- Turkish translation by Ece Okay Isildar, 2007.
- Croatian translation by Selma Parisi, 2010.
- Greek translation by Magdalena Zira, 2011.

La Petite pièce en haut de l'escalier

- Spanish translation by Mauricio Garcia Lozano, 2010.
- Greek translation by Nikiforos Papandreou, 2010.
- Slovenian translation by Ana Parne, 2010.
- Albanian translation by Erion Hinaj, 2010.

Je pense à Yu

- German translation by Heinz Schwarzinger, 2011, Felix Bloch Verlag, 2011.
- Catalan translation by Elisabet Ràfols, 2015.

=== Fiction ===
Carmen en do mineur

- Chinese translation. Éditions Hai Tian Publishing house, Bei Jing, 1998
- Spanish translation by Florencia Fernandes Feijoo, Éditions Cantaro, Buenos Aires, 2002.
- English translation by Susan Ouriou, Red Deer Press, Calgary. 2005. ISBN 9780889953222

Do pour Dolorès

- German translation by Rosemarie Griebel-Kruip, Éditions Patmos, Düsseldorf, 1999.
- Italian translation by Luca Scarlini, Buena Vista Editore, Rome, 2001.
- English translation by Susan Ouriou, Red Deer Press, Calgary. 2002. ISBN 0-88995-254-X.
- Chinese translation Éditions Beijing publishing House, Bei Jing, 2002.
- Arabic translation. Éditions Elias, Le Caire, 2005.

== Prizes and honours ==
- 1995: Winner, Governor General's Award for French-language drama, Les Quatre morts de Marie
- 1997: Finalist, Mr. Christie's Book Award for Carmen (translation by John Murrell)
- 1997: Finalist, Dora Mavor Moore Awards for The Four Lives of Marie
- 1998: Finalist, Governor General's Award for La Peau d'Élisa
- 1998: Floyd S. Chalmers Canadian Play Award for The Four Lives of Marie
- 1999: Finalist, Governor General's Award for Les Sept jours de Simon Labrosse
- 2000: White Ravens Selection, International Children's Library, Munich, Do pour Dolorès
- 2002: Finalist, Dora Mavor Moore Awards for Elisa's Skin (translation by John Murrell)
- 2002: Finalist, Governor General's Award for Jean et Béatrice
- 2002: Prix de la Francophonie de la SACD (France)
- 2002: Siminovitch Prize in Theatre
- 2004: Prix Sony Labou Tansi (France) for Le Collier d'Hélène
- 2005: Masque, Best French-Canadian production for Jean et Béatrice, Académie Québécoise du Théâtre
- 2008: Finalist, Governor General's Award for Serial Killer et autres pièces courtes
- 2009: Finalist, Grand Prix de littérature dramatique (France) for La Petite pièce en haut de l'escalier
- 2014: Winner, Governor General's Award for French-language drama, Small Talk
