= Jasmine Dubé =

Canadian actor, writer and director

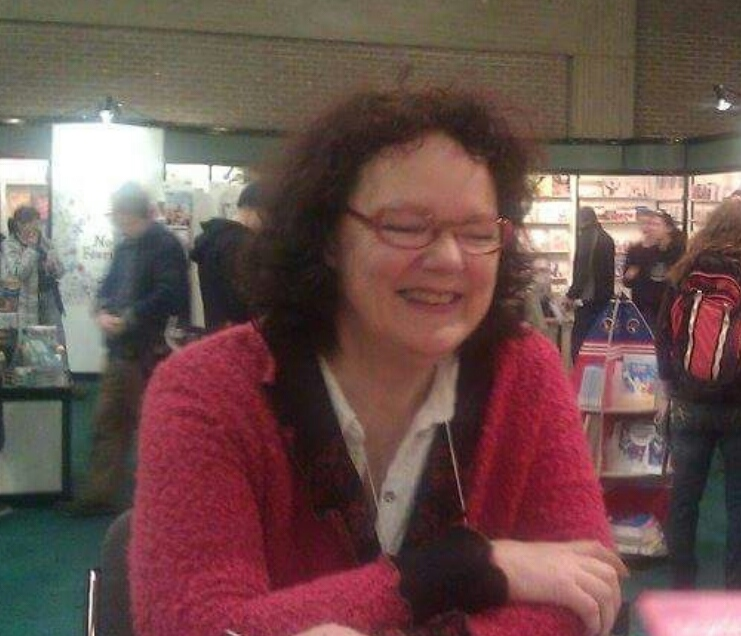
- Jasmine Dubé (SDLM '16)
- Born: April 11, 1957 (age 69)
- Occupations: Actor, writer and director

Jasmine Dubé (born April 11, 1957) is a Canadian actor, writer and director living in Quebec.

She was born in Amqui, studied at the Cégep de Matane and graduated from the National Theatre School of Canada in 1978. She has worked with a number of theatre companies in Quebec, including the Théâtre de la Marmaille and Théâtre PÀP (Petit à Petit) in Montreal. In 1984, she performed in David Lonergan's one-women show Caméléonne. She wrote her first play Bouches décousues in 1992.

She writes scripts for theatre, mainly for young audiences, and for television, as well as fiction for young people. Her work has been translated into English, Portuguese and Italian. She has developed scripts for a number of television series including Passe-Partout, Télé-Pirate and Michou et Pilo.

From 1985 to 1991, she wrote a column on theatre for the literary magazine Lurelu.

Dubé is co-founder and artistic director for Théâtre Bouches Décousues. In 2005, this company received the grand prize of the Conseil des arts de Montréal for its contribution to local theatre.

She has received a number of awards including:

- the Prix Arthur-Buies in 1996 for her work
- the Prix Alvine-Bélisle in 1998 for L'Ourson qui voulait une Juliette

Her works have also been finalists several times for the Governor General's Literary Awards.

Her play Petit monstre received an award for best production from the Association québécoise des critiques de théâtre and was a finalist for a Governor General's Award.
