= Olivier Choinière =

Canadian playwright

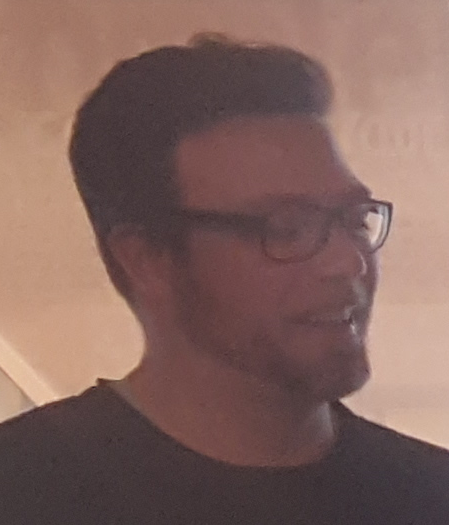
Olivier Choinière

Olivier Choinière (born July 10, 1973) is a Canadian playwright from Granby, Quebec. He is most noted as a three-time nominee for the Governor General's Award for French-language drama, receiving nominations at the 1998 Governor General's Awards for Le Bain des raines, at the 2006 Governor General's Awards for Venise-en-Québec, and at the 2013 Governor General's Awards for Nom de domaine.

A 1996 graduate of the National Theatre School of Canada, he wrote and staged his first theatrical play, Autodafé, in 1997. His subsequent plays have included La légende du Manuel Sacré (1998), Les trains (1999), Soldats de bois (1999), Tsé-Tsé (2000), Agromorphobia (2001), Jocelyne est en dépression (2002), Beauté intérieure (2003), Félicité (2004), Chante avec moi (2010), Ennemi public (2015) and Zoé (2020).

Félicité has been translated into English by Caryl Churchill as Bliss, and Jocelyne est en dépression has been translated by Paula Wing as Jocelyne Is Under a Cloud Today. Choinière has also translated a number of English language plays into French, including Darrell Dennis's Tales of an Urban Indian, Joan MacLeod's The Shape of a Girl, and Mark O'Rowe's Howie the Rookie.

Sometimes described as a "theatre hacker", his conventional plays have been interspersed with experiments in "gonzo theatre", theatrical flash mobs, and podcasted "déambulatoire" plays.

In 2014, he was awarded both the Canada Council's Victor Martyn Lynch-Staunton Award and the Siminovitch Prize in Theatre.
