= Jennifer Tremblay =

Canadian writer (born 1973)

- Born: 1973 (age 52–53); Forestville, Quebec, Canada
- Education: Université du Québec à Montréal
- Occupation: Writer

Jennifer Tremblay (born 1973) is a Canadian writer living in Quebec.

She was born in Forestville. In 1990, she published a collection of poetry Histoires de foudre. She went on to graduate in creative writing at the Université du Québec à Montréal in 1995. Tremblay contributed short stories and articles to various magazines and wrote episodes for the Radio-Canada television series Les Chatouilles and Bouledogue Bazar. In 2004, she published her first novel Tout ce qui brille.

In 2004, she co-founded the publishing house Éditions de la Bagnole, which publishes books for youth. It is now part of Groupe Livre Québecor Média.

== Selected works ==
Sources:

- Un secret pour Matisse, youth literature (2004)
- Miro et les canetons du lac vert, youth literature (2006)
- Sacha et son sushi, youth literature (2008)
- Matisse et les vaches lunaires, youth literature (2009)
- La Liste, play, received the Governor General's Award for French-language drama in 2008 and the Prix Michel-Tremblay in 2010 She also received an award from the Centre national du théâtre in France. Her play was translated into five languages.
- Le Carrousel, play (2011)
- La délivrance, play (2014)
- Blues nègre dans une chambre rose, novel (2015)
