= François Godin (playwright) =

Canadian actor

François Godin is a Canadian actor and playwright from Quebec, most noted as a two-time Governor General's Award nominee for French-language drama.

As an actor, he had early roles in the first touring production of Lilies (Les Feluettes) and the Montreal production of Les Misérables. He appeared in Une soirée avec Jacques Brel for the Théâtre français de Toronto in 1993, for which he received a Dora Mavor Moore Award nomination for Best Leading Actor, Musical Theatre. He wrote various radio dramas before premiering his first theatrical play, Il n’y a nulle part en Amérique, in 1994, and continued to work principally as a musical theatre actor until premiering Louisiane Nord in 2004.

Louisiane Nord was a Governor General's Award nominee at the 2005 Governor General's Awards.

His third play, Je suis d'un would be pays, followed in 2007, and received Godin's second GG nomination at the 2009 Governor General's Awards.

He is a graduate of the Conservatoire d'art dramatique de Montréal.
