= Suzanne Lebeau =

Canadian actor and writer

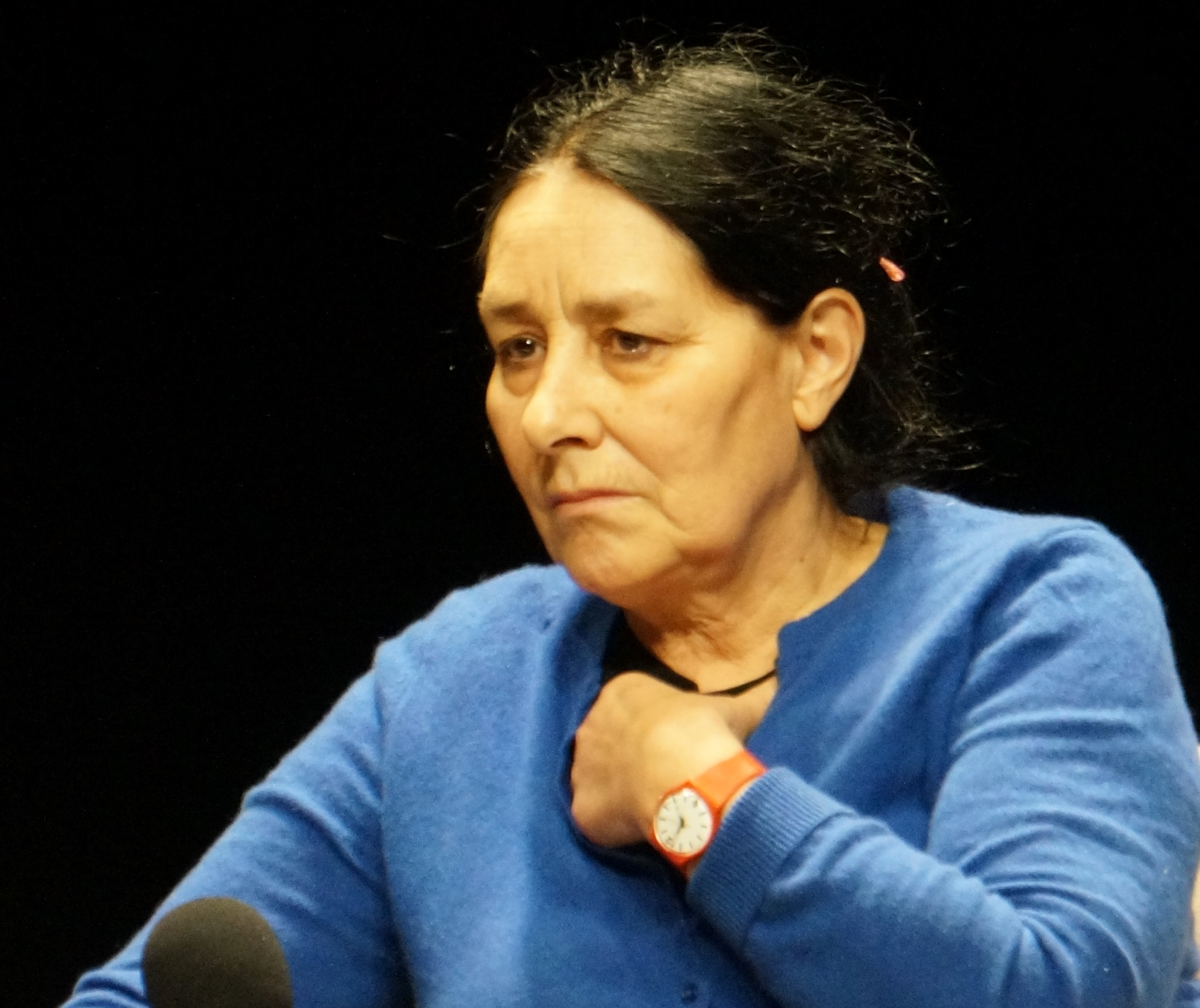
Suzanne Lebeau in 2015

Suzanne Lebeau (born April 28, 1948) is a Canadian (Québécois) actor and writer.

The daughter of Blanche Payette and Paul Lebeau, Lebeau was born in Montreal. Drawn to the theatre, she studied with Jacques Crête and Gilles Maheu and performed in classical and contemporary works. Lebeau went on to study with the mime Étienne Decroux in Paris and then studied pantomime and marionettes in Wrocław, Poland with the Henryk Tomaszewski Pantomime Theatre and Puppet Theatre. She was exposed to children's theatre through a contract with Théâtre La Roulotte in Longueuil. She has taught writing for young audiences, including at the National Theatre School of Canada. In 1975, she founded the Le Carrousel theatre company with Gervais Gaudreault, also serving as co-director. She wrote her first children's play Ti-Jean voudrait ben s'marier, mais.... in 1975, gradually focusing more on writing than on performing.

From November 1993 to February 1994, Lebeau was writer-in-residence at the Chartreuse de Villeneuve-lez-Avignon in France. In 1998, she was named a Chevalier in the French Order of La Pléiade. The Musée de la civilisation in Quebec City asked her to be artistic adviser for its exhibition "Grandir" and to write the text for the exposition "De quel droit ?". Lebeau was a finalist for a Molière Award in 2008. She received the Prix Athanase-David in 2010 and 2013 then being awarded the Prix Rideau Hommage and the Gascon-Thomas Award from the National Theatre School of Canada. In June 2016, Lebeau received a Governor General's Performing Arts Award, Canada's highest honor in the performing arts, for her lifetime contribution to Canadian theatre.

== Selected works ==
- Une lune entre deux maisons (1979)
- Les Petits Pouvoirs (1981)
- Les petits pouvoirs (1983), received the Chalmers Children's Play Award
- Contes d'enfants réels (1990)
- Conte du jour et de la nuit (1991), Grand Prix in the category theatre from the Journal de Montréal
- Salvador (1996), received the Prix Francophonie Jeunesse from Radio France Internationale and the Prix littéraire from the citizens of the Maine-et-Loire department
- L'ogrelet (1997), received a Masque Award for original script from the Académie québécoise du théâtre
- Contes à rebours (1997)
- Petit Pierre (2001)
- Souliers de sable (2005)
- Le Bruit des os qui craquent (2006), received a Governor General's Award for French-language drama
