= Normand Chaurette =

Canadian playwright (1954–2022)

- Born: July 9, 1954; Montreal, Quebec, Canada
- Died: August 31, 2022 (aged 68)
- Occupation: Playwright
- Writing career
- Period: 1980s–2022

Normand Chaurette OC (July 9, 1954 – August 31, 2022) was a Canadian playwright, best known as one of the first prominent writers of LGBT-themed plays in Quebec and Canada.

== Life and career ==
Chaurette's career began in 1976 with Rêve d'une nuit d'hôpital, a radio play broadcast by Radio-Canada and inspired by the life of Émile Nelligan. The play won the international Prix Paul-Gilson for francophone radio drama, and was later presented in a stage format in 1980. His second play, Provincetown Playhouse, juillet 1919, j'avais 19 ans, was staged in 1981.

His 1991 play Les reines became the first theatre piece by a Quebec writer to be staged at the Comédie-Française.

He was a three-time winner of the Governor General's Award for French-language drama, for Le Passage de l'Indiana in 1996, Le Petit Köchel in 2001 and Ce qui meurt en dernier in 2011, and was nominated for Fragments d'une lettre d'adieu lus par des géologues in 1986.

He also published a novel, Scènes d'enfants, which was nominated for the Governor General's Award for French-language fiction in 1988, and a non-fiction book, Comment tuer Shakespeare, which won the Governor General's Award for French-language non-fiction in 2012. He won a Floyd S. Chalmers Canadian Play Award in 1993 for Les reines.

He also translated a number of plays into French, including Friedrich Schiller's Mary Stuart, Henrik Ibsen's Hedda Gabler and works by Shakespeare. As well, his translation of Romeo and Juliet was directed by Yves Desgagné as the 2006 film Roméo et Juliette,

He was named an Officer of the Order of Canada in 2004.

== Works ==
=== Plays ===
- Rêve d'une nuit d'hôpital (1976)
- Provincetown Playhouse, juillet 1919, j'avais 19 ans (1981)
- Les Trois Grâces (1982)
- La Société de Métis (1983)
- Fragments d'une lettre d'adieu lus par les géologues (1986)
- Les Reines (1991)
- Le Passage de l'Indiana (1996)
- Je vous écris du Caire (1996)
- Brève d'ailleurs (1997)
- Stabat Mater I (1997)
- Le Pont du Gard vu de nuit (1998)
- Stabat Mater II (1999)
- Petit navire (1999)
- Le Petit Köchel (2000)
- Ce qui meurt en dernier (2011)

=== Novel ===
- Scènes d'enfants (1988)

=== Non-fiction ===
- Comment tuer Shakespeare (2011)
