= Geneviève Billette =

Canadian writer

Geneviève Billette is a Quebec writer and translator.

She was born in Quebec City and received a BA from the Université de Montréal. Billette went on to study at the National Theatre School of Canada. She has written radio plays for Radio Canada. She was writer in residence for Théâtre Carrousel and at the Festival International des Théâtres Francophones in Limoges, France. Billette has also translated plays by several Mexican playwrights into French. Her work has been performed in France, in Mexico and in Switzerland.

== Selected works ==
- Crime contre l'humanité (1999), shortlisted for the Governor General's Award for French-language drama; translated into English as Crime Against Humanity
- Le Goûteur (2002)
- Le Pays des genoux, received the Governor General's Award for French-language drama, the Prix Paul-Gilson and the Prix Gratien-Gélinas
- Les ours dorment enfin (2010), shortlisted for the Governor General's Award and received the Prix Annick-Lansman
- Contre le temps (2012), received the Governor General's Award
