= Governor General's Award for French-language fiction =

Canadian literary award

The Governor General's Award for French-language fiction is a Canadian literary award that annually recognizes one Canadian writer for a fiction book written in French. It is one of fourteen Governor General's Awards for Literary Merit, seven each for creators of English- and French-language books. The Governor General's Awards program is administered by the Canada Council for the Arts.

The program was created and inaugurated in 1937, for 1936 publications in two categories, conventionally called the 1936 awards. French-language works were first recognized by the 1959 Governor General's Awards. Prior to 1959, the Canada Council did not present any awards for French-language literature, although four works originally published in French — Ringuet's Thirty Acres, Germaine Guèvremont's The Outlander, and Gabrielle Roy's The Tin Flute and Street of Riches — won the Governor General's Award for English-language fiction when a follow-up English translation was published.

The winners alone were announced until 1979, when Canada Council released in advance a shortlist of three nominees. Since then, the advance shortlist has numbered three to six; from 2002, always five.

== Winners and nominees ==
=== 1950s ===
Year	Author	Title
1959	André Giroux	Malgré tout, la joie

=== 1960s ===
Year	Author	Title
1960	No award presented	
1961	Yves Thériault	Ashini
1962	Jacques Ferron	Contes du pays incertain
1963	No award presented	
1964	Jean-Paul Pinsonneault	Les terres sèches
1965	Gérard Bessette	L'incubation
1966	Claire Martin	La joue droite
1967	Jacques Godbout	Salut Galarneau
1968	Hubert Aquin	Trou de mémoire
1968	Marie-Claire Blais	Les Manuscrits de Pauline Archange
1969	Louise Maheux-Forcier	Une forêt pour Zoé

=== 1970s ===
Year	Author	Title
1970	Monique Bosco	La femme de Loth
1971	Gérard Bessette	Le cycle
1972	Antonine Maillet	Don l'Orignal
1973	Réjean Ducharme	L'hiver de force
1974	Victor-Lévy Beaulieu	Don Quichotte de la démanche
1975	Anne Hébert	Les enfants du sabbat
1976	André Major	Les rescapés
1977	Gabrielle Roy	Ces enfants de ma vie
1978	Jacques Poulin	Les grandes marées
1979	Marie-Claire Blais	Le Sourd dans la ville
1979	Suzanne Jacob	La Survie
1979	Suzanne Paradis	Miss Charlie

=== 1980s ===
Year	Author	Title
1980	Pierre Turgeon	La première personne
1980	Gilbert La Rocque	Les masques
1980	Hélène Ouvrard	La noyante
1981	Denys Chabot	La province lunaire
1981	Noël Audet	Ah, l'amour l'amour
1981	Aline Beaudin Beaupré	L'aventure de Blanche Morti
1981	Louis Caron	Le canard de bois
1982	Roger Fournier	Le cercle des arènes
1982	Gaëtan Brulotte	Le surveillant
1982	Louis Caron	Les fils de la liberté II: La corne de brume
1982	Anne Hébert	Les fous de Bassan
1983	Suzanne Jacob	Laura Laur
1983	Victor-Lévy Beaulieu	Discours de Samm
1983	France Ducasse	Du lieu des voyages
1983	Carole Massé	L'Existence
1983	Francine Noël	Maryse
1983	Suzanne Robert	Vulpera
1984	Jacques Brault	Agonie
1984	Madeleine Ouellette-Michalska	La Maison Trestler
1984	Jacques Poulin	Volkswagen Blues
1984	Jacques Savoie	Les Portes tournantes
1984	Marie José Thériault	Les Demoiselles de Numidie
1985	Fernand Ouellette	Lucie ou un midi en novembre
1985	Louise Bouchard	Les Images
1985	Jean-Paul Fugère	Popa moman et le saint homme
1985	Suzanne Paradis	La Ligne bleue
1986	Yvon Rivard	Les silences du corbeau
1986	Pierre Nepveu	L'hiver de Mira Christophe
1986	Sylvain Trudel	Le souffle de l'Harmattan
1987	Gilles Archambault	L'obsédante obèse et autres agressions
1987	André Major	L'Hiver au coeur
1987	Jacques Marchand	Premier mouvement
1987	Francine Noël	Myriam première
1988	Jacques Folch-Ribas	Le Silence ou le Parfait Bonheur
1988	Noël Audet	L'Ombre de l'épervier
1988	Normand Chaurette	Scènes d'enfants
1988	Christian Mistral	Vamp
1989	Louis Hamelin	La Rage
1989	Robert Lalonde	Le Diable en personne
1989	Jacques Poulin	Le Vieux Chagrin

=== 1990s ===
Year	Author	Title
1990	Gérald Tougas	La Mauvaise foi
1990	Louis Lefebvre	Le Collier d'Hurracan
1990	Michèle Mailhot	Le Passé composé
1990	Jean Marcel	Jérôme ou de la traduction
1990	France Vézina	Osther, le chat criblé d'étoiles
1991	André Brochu	La croix du Nord
1991	Flora Balzano	Soigne ta chute
1991	Georges-Hébert Germain	Christophe Colomb: Naufrage sur les côtes du paradis
1991	Hans-Jürgen Greif	L'Autre Pandore
1991	Hélène Rioux	Les Miroirs d'Éléonore
1992	Anne Hébert	L'enfant chargé de songes
1992	Lise Bissonnette	Marie suivait l'été
1992	Louis Lefebvre	Guanahani
1992	Gilles Pellerin	Je reviens avec la nuit
1992	Louise Simard	La très noble demoiselle
1993	Nancy Huston	Cantique des plaines
1993	Esther Croft	Au commencement était le froid
1993	Robert Lalonde	Sept lacs plus au nord
1993	Rober Racine	Le Mal de Vienne
1993	Pierre Yergeau	Tu attends la neige, Léonard?
1994	Robert Lalonde	Le petit aigle à tête blanche
1994	Réjean Ducharme	Va savoir
1994	Daniel Poliquin	L'Écureuil noir
1994	Hélène Rioux	Pense à mon rendez-vous
1994	Sylvain Trudel	Les Prophètes
1995	Nicole Houde	Les Oiseaux de Saint-John Perse
1995	Ying Chen	L'Ingratitude
1995	Louis Hamelin	Betsi Larousse ou l'Ineffable
1995	Louis Jolicoeur	Saisir l'absence
1995	André Major	La Vie provisoire
1996	Marie-Claire Blais	Soifs
1996	Nancy Huston	Instruments des ténèbres
1996	Roger Magini	Un homme défait
1996	Jocelyne Saucier	La vie comme une image
1996	Lise Vaillancourt	L'Été des eiders
1997	Aude	Cet imperceptible mouvement
1997	Bernard Assiniwi	La Saga des Béothuks
1997	Lise Bissonnette	Quittes et Doubles – Scènes de réciprocité
1997	Pierre Morency	La Vie entière – Histoires naturelles du Nouveau Monde
1997	Pierre Ouellet	Légende dorée
1998	Christiane Frenette	La Terre ferme
1998	Marie-Célie Agnant	Le Silence comme le sang
1998	Madeleine Gagnon	Le Deuil du soleil
1998	Nancy Huston	L'Empreinte de l'ange
1998	Pierre Samson	Un garçon de compagnie
1999	Lise Tremblay	La Danse juive
1999	Hugues Corriveau	Le Ramasseur de souffle
1999	Jacques Marchand	Les Vents dominants
1999	Carole Massé	L'Ennemi
1999	Gaétan Soucy	La Petite Fille qui aimait trop les allumettes

=== 2000s ===
Year	Author	Title
2000	Jean-Marc Dalpé	Un vent se lève qui éparpille
2000	Christiane Duchesne	L'Homme des silences
2000	Roger Magini	Styx
2000	Pierre Samson	Il était une fois une ville
2000	Alison Lee Strayer	Jardin et prairie
2001	Andrée A. Michaud	Le ravissement
2001	Marie-Claire Blais	Dans la foudre et la lumière
2001	Rachel Leclerc	Ruelle Océan
2002	Monique LaRue	La Gloire de Cassiodore
2002	Guy Demers	L'Intime
2002	Monique Proulx	Le Cœur est un muscle involontaire
2002	Hélène Vachon	La tête ailleurs
2002	Pierre Yergeau	La désertion
2003	Élise Turcotte	La maison étrangère
2003	Jean-François Chassay	L’Angle mort
2003	Marie Gagnier	Console-moi
2003	Gaétan Soucy	Music-Hall!
2003	Larry Tremblay	Le Mangeur de bicyclette
2004	Pascale Quiviger	Le cercle parfait
2004	Marguerite Andersen	Parallèles
2004	Katerine Caron	Vous devez être heureuse
2004	Sergio Kokis	Les amants d'Alfama
2004	Didier Leclair	Ce pays qui est le mien
2005	Aki Shimazaki	Hotaru
2005	Marie-Claire Blais	Augustino et le chœur de la destruction
2005	Nicolas Dickner	Nikolski
2005	Christiane Frenette	Après la nuit rouge
2005	Guy Lalancette	Un amour empoulaillé
2006	Andrée Laberge	La Rivière du loup
2006	Michael Delisle	Le sort de fille
2006	Louis Hamelin	Sauvages
2006	Jocelyne Saucier	Jeanne sur les routes
2006	Pierre Yergeau	La Cité des vents
2007	Sylvain Trudel	La mer de la tranquillité
2007	Esther Croft	Le reste du temps
2007	Robert Lalonde	Espèces en voie de disparition
2007	Anthony Phelps	La contrainte de l’inachevé
2007	Hélène Rioux	Mercredi soir au Bout du monde
2008	Marie-Claire Blais	Naissance de Rebecca à l’ère des tourments
2008	Jean-François Beauchemin	Ceci est mon corps
2008	Guillaume Corbeil	L'Art de la fugue
2008	Monique Proulx	Champagne
2008	Jean-Pierre Trépanier	Colomia
2009	Julie Mazzieri	Le discours sur la tombe de l'idiot
2009	Jean-François Beauchemin	Cette année s'envole ma jeunesse
2009	Nadine Bismuth	Êtes-vous mariée à un psychopathe?
2009	Dominique Fortier	Du bon usage des étoiles
2009	Aki Shimazaki	Zakuro

=== 2010s ===
Year	Author	Title
2010	Kim Thúy	Ru
2010	Marie-Claire Blais	Mai au bal des prédateurs
2010	Martine Desjardins	Maleficium
2010	Agnès Gruda	Onze petites trahisons
2010	Dany Laferrière	L’énigme du retour
2011	Perrine Leblanc	L’homme blanc
2011	Alain Beaulieu	Le postier Passila
2011	Jean-Simon Desrochers	Les sabliers de solitude
2011	Tassia Trifiatis	Mère-grand
2011	Mélanie Vincelette	Polynie
2012	France Daigle	Pour sûr
2012	Ryad Assani-Razaki	La main d'Iman
2012	Charles Bolduc	Les truites à mains nues
2012	Catherine Mavrikakis	Les derniers jours de Smokey Nelson
2012	Audrée Wilhelmy	Oss
2013	Stéphanie Pelletier	Quand les guêpes se taisent
2013	Sergio Kokis	Culs-de-sac
2013	Roger Magini	Ilitch, mort ou vif
2013	Marc Séguin	Hollywood
2013	Gérald Tougas	Le deuxième train de la nuit
2014	Andrée A. Michaud	Bondrée
2014	Michael Delisle	Le Feu de mon père
2014	Alain Farah	Pourquoi Bologne
2014	Robert Lalonde	C’est le cœur qui meurt en dernier
2014	Larry Tremblay	L’orangeraie
2015	Nicolas Dickner	Six degrés de liberté
2015	Françoise de Luca	Sena
2015	Marilyne Fortin	La Fabrica
2015	Catherine Harton	Traité des peaux
2015	Dominique Scali	À la recherche de New Babylon
2016	Dominique Fortier	Au péril de la mer
2016	Anaïs Barbeau-Lavalette	La femme qui fuit
2016	Hugues Corriveau	Les Enfants de Liverpool
2016	Martine Delvaux	Blanc dehors
2016	Daniel Grenier	L'Année la plus longue
2017	Christian Guay-Poliquin	Le Poids de la neige
2017	Virginie Blanchette-Doucet	117 Nord
2017	Mylène Bouchard	L'Imparfaite Amitié
2017	Michael Delisle	Le Palais de la fatigue
2017	Stéphane Larue	Le Plongeur
2018	Karoline Georges	De synthèse
2018	Christophe Bernard	La bête creuse
2018	Maxime Raymond Bock	Les noyades secondaires
2018	Naomi Fontaine	Manikanetish
2018	Olivier Sylvestre	Noms fictifs
2019	Céline Huyghebaert	Le drap blanc
2019	Edem Awumey	Mina parmi les ombres
2019	Sylvie Drapeau	La terre
2019	Éléonore Goldberg	Maison fauve
2019	Mariève Maréchale	La Minotaure

=== 2020s ===
Year	Author	Title	Ref
2020	Sophie Létourneau	Chasse à l'homme	
2020	Jennifer Bélanger	Menthol	
2020	Naomi Fontaine	Shuni	
2020	Marie-Ève Lacasse	Autobiographie de l'étranger	
2020	Marie-Pier Lafontaine	Chienne	
2021	Fanny Britt	Faire les sucres	
2021	Sébastien Chabot	Noir métal	
2021	Paul Serge Forest	Tout est ori	
2021	Sylvie Laliberté	Jʼai montré toutes mes pattes blanches je nʼen ai plus	
2021	Olivia Tapiero	Rien du tout	
2022	Alain Farah	Mille secrets mille dangers	
2022	Maryse Andraos	Sans refuge	
2022	Charlotte Biron	Jardin radio	
2022	Dominique Fortier	Les ombres blanches	
2022	Larry Tremblay	Tableau final de l'amour	
2023	Marie Hélène Poitras	Galumpf	
2023	David Clerson	Mon fils ne revint que sept jours	
2023	Brigitte Haentjens	Sombre est la nuit	
2023	Carole Labarre	Lʼor des mélèzes	
2023	Stéfani Meunier	Une carte postale de lʼocéan	
2024	Steve Poutré	Lait cru	
2024	Pascale Beauregard	Muette	
2024	Louis-Daniel Godin	Le Compte est bon	
2024	Emmanuelle Pierrot	La version qui n’intéresse personne	
2024	Mathieu Rolland	De grandes personnes	
2025	Katia Belkhodja	Les déterrées	
2025	Alexandra Boilard-Lefebvre	Une histoire silencieuse	
2025	Martina Chumova	Je mets mes rêves sur la table	
2025	Patrice Lessard	Rapines	
2025	Cristina Vanciu	Femmes silencieuses	
2026	Alex Thibodeau	Comme les éclipses	
2026	Virginie Chaloux-Gendron	Tout cela m'appartient	
2026	Charlotte Gosselin	La glace part en morceaux	
2026	Gabriel Marcoux-Chabot	Godpèle	
2026	Sarah McNeil	Pathologique	
