= 2000 Governor General's Awards =

Canadian literary award

The 2000 Governor General's Awards for Literary Merit were presented by Adrienne Clarkson, Governor General of Canada, and Jean-Louis Roux, Chairman of the Canada Council for the Arts, on November 14 at Rideau Hall.

== English ==
Category	Winner	Nominated
Fiction	Michael Ondaatje, Anil's Ghost	Margaret Atwood, The Blind Assassin; Austin Clarke, The Question; David Adams Richards, Mercy Among the Children; Eden Robinson, Monkey Beach
Non-fiction	Nega Mezlekia, Notes from the Hyena's Belly	Robert Bringhurst, A Story as Sharp as a Knife; Trevor Herriot, River in a Dry Land; A. B. McKillop, The Spinster and the Prophet
Poetry	Don McKay, Another Gravity	George Bowering, His Life; A. F. Moritz, Rest on the Flight into Egypt; John Pass, Water Stair; Patricia Young, Ruin and Beauty
Drama	Timothy Findley, Elizabeth Rex	George Boyd, Consecrated Ground; Linda Griffiths, Alien Creature; Daniel MacIvor and Daniel Brooks, Monster; Jason Sherman, It's All True
Children's literature	Deborah Ellis, Looking for X	Martha Brooks, Being with Henry; Sharon E. McKay, Charlie Wilcox; Sheldon Oberman, The Shaman's Nephew; Duncan Thornton, Kalifax
Children's illustration	Marie-Louise Gay, Yuck, A Love Story	Nelly Hofer and Ernst Hofer, The Snow Queen; Marthe Jocelyn, Hannah's Collections; Regolo Ricci, The Market Wedding; Cybèle Young, Pa's Harvest
French to English translation	Robert Majzels, Just Fine (France Daigle, Pas pire)	Sheila Fischman, Terra Firma (Christiane Frenette, La Terre ferme); Linda Gaboriau, Down Dangerous Passes Road (Michel Marc Bouchard, Le chemin des Passes-dangereuses); Bobby Theodore, 15 Seconds (François Archambault, 15 secondes)

== French ==
Category	Winner	Nominated
Fiction	Jean-Marc Dalpé, Un vent se lève qui éparpille	Christiane Duchesne, L'Homme des silences; Roger Magini, Styx; Pierre Samson, Il était une fois une ville; Alison Lee Strayer, Jardin et prairie
Non-fiction	Gérard Bouchard, Genèse des nations et cultures du Nouveau Monde	Brian T. Fitch, À l'ombre de la littérature; Olga Hazan, Le mythe du progrès artistique; Yves Lavertu, Jean-Charles Harvey; Robert Major, Convoyages
Poetry	Normand de Bellefeuille, La Marche de l'aveugle sans son chien	Martine Audet, Orbites; Joël Des Rosiers, Vétiver; Madeleine Gagnon, Rêve de pierre; Claude Paré, Exécuté en chambre
Drama	Wajdi Mouawad, Littoral	Geneviève Billette, Crime contre l'humanité; Serge Boucher, 24 Poses; Jasmine Dubé, L'Arche de Noémie; Lise Vaillancourt, Le petit dragon and La balade de Fannie et Carcassonne
Children's literature	Charlotte Gingras, Un été de Jade	Guy Dessureault, L'homme au chat; François Gravel, L'été de la moustache; Gilles Tibo, La Planète du petit géant; Hélène Vachon, Le délire de Somerset
Children's illustration	Anne Villeneuve, L'Écharpe rouge	Marie-Louise Gay, Sur mon île; Pascale Constantin, Gloups!, Bébé-vampire; Geneviève Côté, La grande aventure d'un petit mouton noir; Gérard DuBois, Riquet à la Houppe
English to French translation	Lori Saint-Martin and Paul Gagné, Un parfum de cèdre	Jude Des Chênes, L'honneur du guerrier; Dominique Issenhuth, Amants
