= 1995 Governor General's Awards =

Canadian literary award

The 1995 Governor General's Literary Awards were presented by Roméo LeBlanc, Governor General of Canada on November 14 at the Winter Garden Theatre in Toronto. Each winner received a cheque for $10,000 and a copy of their books specially bound by master bookbinder Pierre Ouvard.

== English ==
| Category | Winner | Nominated |
|---|---|---|
| Fiction | Greg Hollingshead, The Roaring Girl | Diana Atkinson, Highways and Dancehalls; Barbara Gowdy, Mister Sandman; Julie Keith, The Jaguar Temple; Richard B. Wright, The Age of Longing |
| Non-fiction | Rosemary Sullivan, Shadow Maker: The Life of Gwendolyn MacEwen | Charles Foran, The Last House of Ulster: A Family in Belfast; Linda McQuaig, Shooting the Hippo; Sid Marty, Leaning on the Wind |
| Poetry | Anne Szumigalski, Voice | Roo Borson, Night Walk; Di Brandt, Jerusalem, Beloved; Don Domanski, Stations of the Left Hand; Steven Heighton, The Ecstasy of Skeptics |
| Drama | Jason Sherman, Three in the Back, Two in the Head | Brad Fraser, Poor Super Man; Deborah Kimmett, Miracle Mother; Joan MacLeod, The Hope Slide/Little Sister; Eugene Stickland, Some Assembly Required |
| Children's literature | Tim Wynne-Jones, The Maestro | Beth Goobie, Mission Impossible; Hazel Hutchins, Tess; Welwyn Wilton Katz, Out of the Dark; Diana Wieler, RanVan A Worthy Opponent |
| Children's illustration | Ludmila Zeman, The Last Quest of Gilgamesh | Warabé Aska, Aska's Sea Creatures; Geoff Butler, The Killick: A Newfoundland Story; Gary Clement, Just Stay Put; Frances Tyrrell, Woodland Christmas |
| French to English translation | David Homel, Why Must a Black Writer Write About Sex? (Dany Laferrière, Cette grenade dans la main du jeune nègre est-elle une arme ou un fruit?) | Paul Leduc Browne and Dream Michelle Weinroth, Trudeau and the End of a Canadian Dream; Sheila Fischman, No Song, But Silence; Wayne Grady, Black Squirrel; Susan Ouriou, The Road to Chlifa |

== French ==
| Category | Winner | Nominated |
|---|---|---|
| Fiction | Nicole Houde, Les Oiseaux de Saint-John Perse | Ying Chen, L'Ingratitude; Louis Hamelin, Betsi Larousse ou l'Ineffable; Louis Jolicoeur, Saisir l'absence; André Major, La Vie provisoire |
| Non-fiction | Yvan Lamonde, Louis-Antoine Dessaulles. Un seigneur libéral et anticlérical | Hélène-Andrée Bizier, Le Noir et le Rouge; Jean Boivin, La Classe de Messiaen; Marcel Fournier, Marcel Mauss; Daniel Latouche, Plaidoyer pour le Québec |
| Poetry | Émile Martel, Pour orchestre et poète seul | Louise Desjardins, La 2e Avenue précédé de Petite sensation, La minutie de l'araignée, Le marché de l'amour; Jocelyne Felx, La Pierre et les heures; Gérald Gaudet, La Fiction de l'âme; Andrée Lacelle, Tant de vie s'égare |
| Drama | Carole Fréchette, Les Quatre morts de Marie | Jean-Marc Dalpé, Lucky Lady; Suzanne Lebeau, Contes d'enfants réels; Michèle Magny, Marina, le dernier rose aux joues |
| Children's literature | Sonia Sarfati, Comme une peau de chagrin | Jean-Pierre Davidts, Contes du chat gris; Christiane Duchesne, Berthold et Lucrèce; Annouchka Gravel Galouchko, Sho et les dragons d'eau; Jacques Savoie, Toute la beauté du monde |
| Children's illustration | Annouchka Gravel Galouchko, Sho et les dragons d'eau | Marie-Louise Gay, Berthold et Lucrèce; Stéphane Jorisch, Le Baiser maléfique; Pierre Pratt, La Bottine magique de Pipo; Rémy Simard, Le père Noël a une crevaison |
| English to French translation | Hervé Juste, Entre l'ordre et la liberté | Michèle Causse, Loyale à la chasse; Hervé Juste, Trudeau : l'illusion héroïque; Anne Malena, La Maraude; Marie José Thériault, À l'aube de lendemains précaires |
