= 2007 Governor General's Awards =

Canadian literary award

The 2007 Governor General's Awards for Literary Merit: Finalists in 14 categories (70 books) were announced October 16, winners announced November 27, and awards presented December 13. The prize for writers and illustrators was $25,000 and "a specially crafted copy of the winning book".

The $25,000 cash prize had been "increased from $15,000 in celebration of the Canada Council's 50th anniversary". The publishers of winning books continued to receive $3000, the creators of losing finalists $1000.

== English ==
Category	Winner	Nominated
Fiction	Michael Ondaatje, Divisadero	David Chariandy, Soucouyant; Barbara Gowdy, Helpless; Heather O'Neill, Lullabies for Little Criminals; M. G. Vassanji, The Assassin's Song
Non-fiction	Karolyn Smardz Frost, I've Got a Home in Glory Land: A Lost Tale of the Underground Railroad	Rodrigo Bascunan and Christian Pearce, Enter the Babylon System: Unpacking Gun Culture from Samuel Colt to 50 Cent; John English, Citizen of the World: The Life of Pierre Elliott Trudeau, Volume One: 1919-1968; Stephanie Nolen, 28: Stories of AIDS in Africa; Bridget Stutchbury, Silence of the Songbirds: How We Are Losing the World's Songbirds and What We Can Do to Save Them
Poetry	Don Domanski, All Our Wonder Unavenged	Margaret Atwood, The Door; Brian Henderson, Nerve Language; Dennis Lee, Yesno; Rob Winger, Muybridge's Horse
Drama	Colleen Murphy, The December Man	Salvatore Antonio, In Gabriel's Kitchen; Anosh Irani, The Bombay Plays: The Matka King and Bombay Black; Rosa Labordé, Léo; Morris Panych, What Lies Before Us
Children's literature	Iain Lawrence, Gemini Summer	Hugh Brewster, Carnation, Lily, Lily, Rose: The Story of a Painting; Christopher Paul Curtis, Elijah of Buxton; John Wilson, The Alchemist's Dream; Eva Wiseman, Kanada
Children's illustration	Duncan Weller, The Boy from the Sun	Wallace Edwards, The Painted Circus; Joanne Fitzgerald, The Blue Hippopotamus; Jirina Marton, Marja's Skis; Dusan Petricic, My New Shirt
French to English translation	Nigel Spencer, Augustino and the Choir of Destruction (Marie-Claire Blais, Augustino et le chœur de la déstruction)	Sheila Fischman, My Sister's Blue Eyes (Jacques Poulin, Les Yeux bleus de Mistassini); Robert Majzels and Erín Moure, Notebook of Roses and Civilization (Nicole Brossard, Cahier de roses et de civilisation); Rhonda Mullins, The Decline of the Hollywood Empire (Hervé Fischer, Le déclin de l'empire hollywoodien); John Murrell, Two Plays: John and Beatrice; Helen's Necklace (Carole Fréchette, Jean et Béatrice and Le collier d'Hélène)

== French ==
Category	Winner	Nominated
Fiction	Sylvain Trudel, La mer de la tranquillité	Esther Croft, Le reste du temps; Robert Lalonde, Espèces en voie de disparition; Anthony Phelps, La contrainte de l'inachevé; Hélène Rioux, Mercredi soir au Bout du monde
Non-fiction	Annette Hayward, La querelle du régionalisme au Québec (1904-1931): Vers l'autonomisation de la littérature québécoise	Roland Bourneuf, Pierres de touche; Denise Brassard, Le souffle du passage: Poésie et essai chez Fernand Ouellette; André Cellard, Une toupie sur la tête: Visages de la folie à Saint-Jean-de-Dieu; Michel Cormier, La Russie des illusions: Regard d'un correspondent
Poetry	Serge Patrice Thibodeau, Seul on est	Martine Audet, Les manivelles; Mario Brassard, La somme des vents contraires; Catherine Fortin, Le silence est une voie navigable; Rino Morin Rossignol, Intifada du cœur
Drama	Daniel Danis, Le chant du Dire-Dire	Sébastien Harrisson, Floes et D'Alaska; Steve Laplante, Le Long de la Principale; Suzanne Lebeau, Souliers de sable; Wajdi Mouawad, Assoiffés
Children's literature	François Barcelo, La fatigante et le fainéant	Sophie Gironnay, Philou, architecte et associés; André Leblanc, L'envers de la chanson: Des enfants au travail 1850-1950; Sylvain Meunier, Piercings sanglants; Hélène Vachon, Les saisons vues par Schouster
Children's illustration	Geneviève Côté, La petite rapporteuse de mots	Stéphane-Yves Barroux, Superbricoleur: Le roi de la clef à molette; Manon Gauthier, Ma maman du photomaton; Caroline Merola, Une nuit en ville; Daniel Sylvestre, Ma vie de reptile
English to French translation	Lori Saint-Martin and Paul Gagné, Dernières notes (Tamas Dobozy, Last Notes and Other Stories)	Suzanne Anfossi, Trudeau: Citoyen du monde, tome 1: 1919-1968 (John English, Citizen of the World: The Life of Pierre Elliott Trudeau, Volume One: 1919-1968); Marie Frankland, La chaise berçante (A. M. Klein, The Rocking Chair); Claudine Vivier, Pas l'ombre d'une trace (Norah McClintock, Not a Trace); Sophie Voillot, La fin de l'alphabet (C. S. Richardson, The End of the Alphabet)
