= 1998 Governor General's Awards =

Canadian literary award

The winners of the 1998 Governor General's Literary Awards were announced by Jean-Louis Roux, chairman, and Shirley L. Thomson, Director of the Canada Council for the Arts on November 17 in Ottawa. Each winner received a cheque for $10,000.

== English ==
Category	Winner	Nominated
Fiction	Diane Schoemperlen, Forms of Devotion	Lynn Coady, Strange Heaven; Barbara Gowdy, The White Bone; Wayne Johnston, The Colony of Unrequited Dreams; Kerri Sakamoto, The Electrical Field
Non-fiction	David Adams Richards, Lines on the Water: A Fisherman's Life on the Miramichi	Wayne Grady, The Quiet Limit of the World: A Journey to the North Pole to Investigate Global Warming; Charlotte Gray, Mrs. King: The Life and Times of Isabel Mackenzie King; Judy Schultz, Mamie's Children: Three Generations of Prairie Women; Rudy Wiebe and Yvonne Johnson, Stolen Life: The Journey of a Cree Woman
Poetry	Stephanie Bolster, White Stone: The Alice Poems	Louise Bernice Halfe, Blue Marrow; Michael Ondaatje, Handwriting; Lisa Robertson, Debbie: An Epic; Kathy Shaidle, Lobotomy Magnificat
Drama	Djanet Sears, Harlem Duet	Bruce McManus, Selkirk Avenue; Richard Sanger, Not Spain; Sandra Shamas, Sandra Shamas: A Trilogy of Performances; David Young, Inexpressible Island
Children's literature	Janet Lunn, The Hollow Tree	Gayle Friesen, Janey's Girl; Julie Johnston, The Only Outcast; Janet McNaughton, Make or Break Spring; Sarah Withrow, Bat Summer
Children's illustration	Kady MacDonald Denton, A Child's Treasury of Nursery Rhymes	Victor Bosson, The Fox's Kettle; Harvey Chan, Music for the Tsar of the Sea; Zhong-Yang Huang, The Great Race; Stéphane Jorisch, The Village of a Hundred Smiles and Other Stories
French to English translation	Sheila Fischman, Bambi and Me	Arnold Bennett, Voltaire's Man in America; David Homel, The Second Fiddle; Daniel Sloate, Aknos and Other Poems

== French ==
Category	Winner	Nominated
Fiction	Christiane Frenette, La Terre ferme	Marie-Célie Agnant, Le Silence comme le sang; Madeleine Gagnon, Le Deuil du soleil; Nancy Huston, L'Empreinte de l'ange; Pierre Samson, Un garçon de compagnie
Non-fiction	Pierre Nepveu, Intérieurs du Nouveau Monde : Essais sur les littératures du Québec et des Amériques	Chantal Bouchard, La Langue et le Nombril : Histoire d'une obsession québécoise; Marcel Olscamp, Le Fils du notaire Jacques Ferron 1921-1949 : Genèse intellectuelle d'un écrivain; Régine Robin, Le Golem de l'écriture : De l'autofiction au Cybersoi; Patricia Smart, Les Femmes du Refus global
Poetry	Suzanne Jacob, La Part de feu preceded by Le Deuil de la rancune	Hugues Corriveau, Le Livre du frère; Hélène Dorion, Les Murs de la grotte; Christine Richard, L'Eau des oiseaux; Michel van Schendel, Bitumes
Drama	François Archambault, 15 secondes	Serge Boucher, Motel Hélène; Olivier Choinière, Le Bain des raines; Carole Fréchette, La Peau d'Élisa; Suzanne Lebeau, L'Ogrelet
Children's literature	Angèle Delaunois, Variations sur un même «t'aime»	Guy Dessureault, Lettre de Chine; Daniel Mativat, Terreur sur la Windigo; Danielle Rochette, La Fugue d'Antoine; Hélène Vachon, Le Cinéma de Somerset
Children's illustration	Pierre Pratt, Monsieur Ilétaitunefois	Stéphane Poulin, Petit zizi; Alain Reno, Un tartare pour le bonhomme Sept Heures; Yayo, Le Chasseur d'arc-en-ciel
English to French translation	Charlotte Melançon, Les Sources du moi : La Formation de l'identité moderne	Paule Noyart, Leonard Cohen : Le Canadien errant; Hélène Rioux, Self
