= 2006 Governor General's Awards =

Canadian literary award

The 2006 Governor General's Awards for Literary Merit: Finalists in 14 categories (68 books) were announced October 16, winners announced November 21 and awards presented December 13. The prize for writers and illustrators was $15,000 and "a specially bound copy of the winning book".

In a novelty, the winners were announced at simultaneous press conferences in Toronto and Montreal, with English-language assembled in Toronto and French-language winners assembled in Montreal. The finale spanned two days in Ottawa, with presentations December 13 at Rideau Hall, the Governor General's residence; readings and books signings at Library and Archives Canada on December 14.

== English ==
Category	Winner	Nominated
Fiction	Peter Behrens, The Law of Dreams	Trevor Cole, The Fearsome Particles; Bill Gaston, Gargoyles; Paul Glennon, The Dodecahedron, or A Frame for Frames; Rawi Hage, De Niro's Game
Non-fiction	Ross King, The Judgment of Paris: The Revolutionary Decade That Gave the World Impressionism	Afua Cooper, The Hanging of Angélique: The Untold Story of Canadian Slavery and the Burning of Old Montréal; Susanne Reber and Robert Renaud, Starlight Tour: The Last, Lonely Night of Neil Stonechild; Michael Strangelove, The Empire of Mind: Digital Piracy and the Anti-Capitalist Movement; Christine Wiesenthal, The Half-Lives of Pat Lowther
Poetry	John Pass, Stumbling in the Bloom	Ken Babstock, Airstream Land Yacht; Elizabeth Bachinsky, Home of Sudden Service; Dionne Brand, Inventory; Sharon Thesen, The Good Bacteria
Drama	Daniel MacIvor, I Still Love You	Morwyn Brebner, The Optimists; Lisa Codrington, Cast Iron; Jason Sherman, Adapt or Die: Plays New and Used; Drew Hayden Taylor, In a World Created by a Drunken God
Children's literature	William Gilkerson, Pirate's Passage	André Alexis, Ingrid and the Wolf; Glen Huser, Skinnybones and the Wrinkle Queen; Teresa Toten, Me and the Blondes; Budge Wilson, Friendships
Children's illustration	Leo Yerxa, Ancient Thunder	Eugenie Fernandes, Earth Magic; Annouchka Gravel Galouchko and Stéphan Daigle, The Birdman; Jon Morse, Casey at the Bat; Maxwell Newhouse, Let's Go for a Ride
French to English translation	Hugh Hazelton, Vetiver (Vétiver, Joël Des Rosiers)	Sheila Fischman, The Bicycle Eater (Le Mangeur de bicyclette, Larry Tremblay); Linda Gaboriau, Assorted Candies (Bonbons assortis, Michel Tremblay); Lazer Lederhendler, The Immaculate Conception (L'Immaculée Conception, Gaétan Soucy); Fred A. Reed, A Threat from Within: A Century of Jewish Opposition to Zionism (Au nom de la Torah : une histoire de l'opposition juive au sionisme, Yakov M. Rabkin)

== French ==
Category	Winner	Nominated
Fiction	Andrée Laberge, La Rivière du loup	Michael Delisle, Le sort de fille; Louis Hamelin, Sauvages; Jocelyne Saucier, Jeanne sur les routes; Pierre Yergeau, La Cité des vents
Non-fiction	Pierre Ouellet, À force de voir: histoire de regards	Marie-Françoise Guédon, Le rêve et la forêt: histoires de chamanes nabesna; Thierry Hentsch, Le temps aboli: l'Occident et ses grands récits; Michaël La Chance, Paroxysmes: la parole hyperbolique; Catherine Mavrikakis, Condamner à mort: les meurtres et la loi à l'écran
Poetry	Hélène Dorion, Ravir: les lieux	Paul Bélanger, Origine des méridiens; Jacques Brault, L'artisan; Louise Cotnoir, Les îles; Benoît Jutras, L'Étang noir
Drama	Évelyne de la Chenelière, Désordre public	Olivier Choinière, Venise-en-Québec; Jean-Marc Dalpé, Août: un repas à la campagne; Reynald Robinson, Blue Bayou, la maison de l'étalon
Children's literature	Dany Laferrière, Je suis fou de Vava	Édith Bourget, Les saisons d'Henri; Fernande D. Lamy, Cauchemar aveugle; Françoise Lepage, Poupeska; Daniel Mativat, Nuits rouges
Children's illustration	Rogé, Le gros monstre qui aimait trop lire	Steve Adams, Le trésor de Jacob; Marie Lafrance, Le petit chien de laine; Lino, Les cendres de maman; Frédéric Normandin, Je suis fou de Vava
English to French translation	Sophie Voillot, Un jardin de papier (Salamander, Thomas Wharton)	Dominique Fortier, Parlez-vous boro: voyage aux pays des langues menacées (Spoken Here: Travels Among Threatened Languages, Mark Abley); Dominique Fortier, L'Arbre: une vie (Tree: A Life Story, David Suzuki and Wayne Grady); Daniel Poliquin, L'homme qui voulait boire la mer (The Man Who Wanted to Drink Up the Sea, Pan Bouyoucas); Lori Saint-Martin and Paul Gagné, L'Odyssée de Pénélope (The Penelopiad, Margaret Atwood)
