= 1988 Governor General's Awards =

Canadian literary award

Each winner of the 1988 Governor General's Awards for Literary Merit received $5000 and a medal from the Governor General of Canada. The winners and nominees were selected by a panel of judges administered by the Canada Council for the Arts.

== English ==
Category	Winner	Nominated
Fiction	David Adams Richards, Nights Below Station Street	Margaret Atwood, Cat's Eye; Joan Clark, The Victory of Geraldine Gull; Mark Frutkin, Atmospheres Apollinaire; Kenneth Radu, The Cost of Living
Non-fiction	Anne Collins, In the Sleep Room	Pierre Berton, The Arctic Grail; Alan Borovoy, When Freedoms Collide; Edith Iglauer, Fishing with John
Poetry	Erín Moure, Furious	Lorna Crozier, Angels of Flesh, Angels of Silence; Christopher Dewdney, Radiant Inventory; David McFadden, Gypsy Guitar; Peter Dale Scott, Coming to Jakarta
Drama	George F. Walker, Nothing Sacred	Dennis Foon, Skin from Skin and Liars; Tomson Highway, The Rez Sisters; Maureen Hunter, Footprints on the Moon
Children's literature	Welwyn Wilton Katz, The Third Magic	Martha Brooks, Paradise Café and Other Stories; Brian Doyle, Easy Avenue; Jean Little, Little by Little
Children's illustration	Kim LaFave, Amos's Sweater	Marie-Louise Gay, Angel and the Polar Bear; Jillian Hulme Gilliland, How the Devil Got His Cat; Dayal Kaur Khalsa, Sleepers; Jan Thornhill, The Wildlife ABC
French to English translation	Philip Stratford, Second Chance	Arnold Bennett, The History of the Labour Movement in Quebec; Jane Brierley, A Man of Sentiment: The Memoirs of Philippe-Joseph Aubert de Gaspé; David Homel, How to Make Love to a Negro

== French ==
Category	Winner	Nominated
Fiction	Jacques Folch-Ribas, Le Silence ou le Parfait Bonheur	Noël Audet, L'Ombre de l'épervier; Normand Chaurette, Scènes d'enfants; Christian Mistral, Vamp
Non-fiction	Patricia Smart, Écrire dans la maison du père	Jacques Desautels, Dieux et Mythes de la Grèce ancienne; Lucien Parizeau, Périples autour d'un langage; Fernande Roy, Progrès, harmonie, liberté
Poetry	Marcel Labine, Papiers d'épidémie	François Charron, Le Monde comme obstacle; Louise Dupré, Bonheur; Gilbert Langevin, La Saison hantée
Drama	Jean-Marc Dalpé, Le Chien	Normand Canac-Marquis, Le Syndrome de Cézanne; Marie-Francine Hébert, Oui ou non; Marco Micone, Déjà l'agonie; André Ricard, Le Déversoir des larmes
Children's literature	Michèle Marineau, Cassiopée ou l'Été polonais	Denis Côté, Les prisonniers du zoo; Cécile Gagnon, Châteaux de sable; André Vanasse, Des Millions pour une chanson
Children's illustration	Philippe Béha, Les Jeux de Pic-Mots	Sylvie Daigle, Le Mot de passe; Pierre Pratt, Peut-il, peut-elle?; Gilles Tibo, Simon et les flocons de neige
English to French translation	Didier Holtzwarth, Nucléus	Gérard Boulad, Profession: Religieuse; Jean Lévesque and Michèle Venet, Le Rêve d'une génération; Michel Saint-Germain, Flagrant Délice
