= 1993 Governor General's Awards =

Canadian literary award

Each winner of the 1993 Governor General's Awards for Literary Merit received $10,000 and a medal from the Governor General of Canada. The winners were selected by a panel of judges administered by the Canada Council for the Arts.

== English ==
Category	Winner	Nominated
Fiction	Carol Shields, The Stone Diaries	Caroline Adderson, Bad Imaginings; Thomas King, Green Grass, Running Water; David Adams Richards, For Those Who Hunt the Wounded Down; Carol Windley, Visible Light
Non-fiction	Karen Connelly, Touch the Dragon	Marq de Villiers, The Heartbreak Grape: A Journey in Search of the Perfect Pinot Noir; Marian Fowler, In a Gilded Cage; Jane Jacobs, Systems of Survival; Noël Mostert, Frontiers
Poetry	Don Coles, Forests of the Medieval World	Claire Harris, Drawing Down a Daughter; Monty Reid, Crawlspace: New and Selected Poems; Douglas Burnet Smith, Voices from a Farther Room; Patricia Young, More Watery Still
Drama	Guillermo Verdecchia, Fronteras Americanas	Daniel MacIvor, House Humans; Raymond Storey, The Saints and Apostles; David Young, Glenn
Children's literature	Tim Wynne-Jones, Some of the Kinder Planets	Mitzi Dale, Bryna Means Courage; James Archibald Houston, Drifting Snow: An Arctic Search; Carol Matas, Daniel's Story; Shirley Sterling, My Name Is Seepeetza
Children's illustration	Mireille Levert, Sleep Tight, Mrs. Ming	Scott Cameron, Beethoven Lives Upstairs; Marc Mongeau, There Were Monkeys in My Kitchen!; Russ Willms, Brewster Rooster; Leo Yerxa, Last Leaf First Snowflake to Fall
French to English translation	D. G. Jones, Categorics One, Two and Three	Jane Brierley, The Maerlande Chronicles; Sheila Fischman, Following the Summer; Linda Gaboriau, The Eye Is an Eagle; Käthe Roth, The Last Cod Fish

== French ==
Category	Winner	Nominated
Fiction	Nancy Huston, Cantique des plaines	Esther Croft, Au commencement était le froid; Robert Lalonde, Sept lacs plus au nord; Rober Racine, Le Mal de Vienne; Pierre Yergeau, Tu attends la neige, Léonard?
Non-fiction	François Paré, Les Littératures de l'exiguïté	Léon Dion, Québec 1945–2000 : Les intellectuels et le temps de Duplessis; Maurice Lemire, Formation de l'imaginaire littéraire au Québec 1764–1867; Jean Terrasse, De Mentor à Orphée; Andrée Yanacopoulo, Hans Selye ou la Cathédrale du stress
Poetry	Denise Desautels, Le Saut de l'ange	Denise Boucher, Grandeur nature; Roger Des Roches, La Réalité; Madeleine Gagnon, La Terre est remplie de langage; Serge Patrice Thibodeau, Le Cycle de Prague
Drama	Daniel Danis, Celle-là	Jasmine Dubé, Petit Monstre; Gilbert Dupuis, Kushapatshikan
Children's literature	Michèle Marineau, La Route de Chlifa	Yves Beauchemin, Antoine et Alfred; Dominique Demers, Les grands sapins ne meurent pas; Raymond Plante, Les Dents de la poule
Children's illustration	Stéphane Jorisch, Le Monde selon Jean de ...	Francis Back, Des crayons qui trichent; Michel Bisson, Thomas et la nuit; Sheldon Cohen, Le Plus Long Circuit; François Vaillancourt, Le Premier Voyage de Monsieur Patapoum
English to French translation	Marie José Thériault, L'Oeuvre du Gallois	Hervé Juste, Histoire de la sécurité sociale au Canada; Charlotte Melançon, Grandeur et misère de la modernité
