= Ouvrard =

Ouvrard is a French surname. Notable people with the surname include:

- Gabriel-Julien Ouvrard (1770–1846), French businessman
- Hélène Ouvrard (1938–1999), Quebec writer
- Jean-Pierre Ouvrard (1948–1992), French musicologist, music educator, researcher, and choral conductor
- René Ouvrard (1624–1694), French priest, writer, and composer
