= Sarah McNeil =

Sarah McNeil (born 1998) is a Canadian writer based in Sherbrooke, Quebec.

She is most noted for her novel Patholoqique, which was a shortlisted finalist for the Prix Ringuet and the Governor General's Award for French-language fiction at the 2026 Governor General's Awards.
