= Anthony Phelps =

Haitian-Canadian writer (1928–2025)

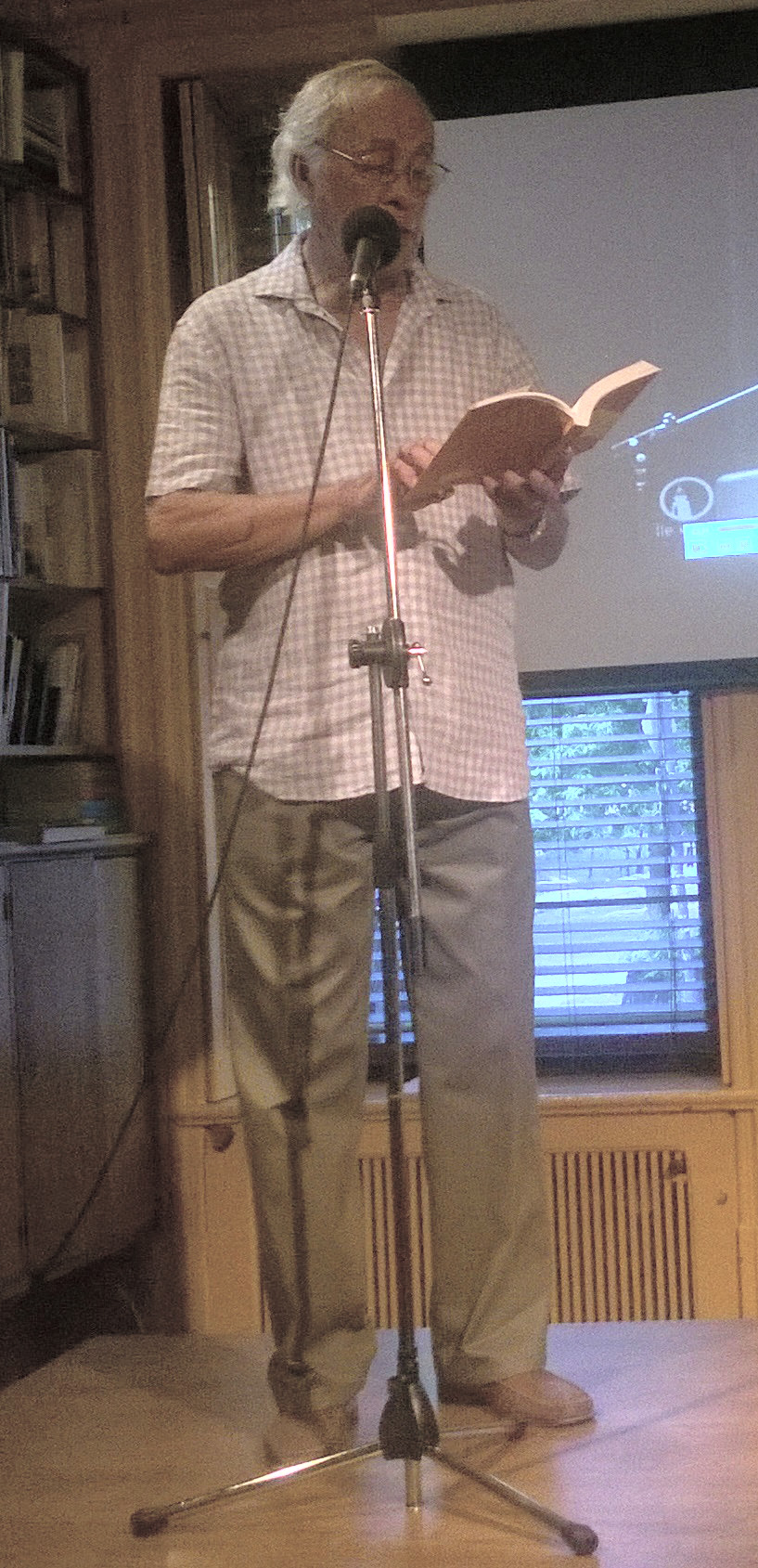

Anthony Phelps (August 25, 1928 – March 11, 2025) was a Haitian-Canadian writer, whose novel La contrainte de l’inachevé was a Governor General's Literary Award nominee for French-language fiction at the 2007 Governor General's Awards.

== Life and career ==
Born in Port-au-Prince, Phelps attended Seton Hall University to study chemistry. Alongside Davertige, Serge Legagneur, Roland Morisseau and René Philoctète, he was a founder of the Haiti Littéraire writing circle and the literary journal Semences. An opponent of the dictatorial regime of François Duvalier, he was forced into exile in 1964 and settled in Montreal, Quebec, where he continued to write and worked in television and theatre. His works have included the poetry collections Été (1960), Éclats de silence (1962), Points cardinaux (1966), Mon pays que voici suivi de Les dits du Fouaux-cailloux (1968), Motifs pour le temps saisonnier (1976), La bélière caraïbe (1980), Même le soleil est nu (1983) and Orchidée nègre (1985); the novels Moins l'infini (1973), Mémoire en colin-maillard (1976) and Haïti! Haïti! (1985, with Gary Klang); the children's story collection Et moi, je suis une île (1973); and the stage play Le conditionnel (1968).

Phelps won the Casa de las Américas Prize in 1985 for Orchidée nègre. In 2016, he was a recipient of the Prix Carbet de la Caraïbe et du Tout-Monde for his body of work. Phelps died on March 11, 2025, at the age of 96.
