= Prix Molson =

Prix Molson may refer to:

- the former name of the Prix Ringuet, a Canadian literary award presented by the Académie des lettres du Québec,
- the French language name of the Molson Prize, a Canadian arts award presented by the Canada Council.
