= Louise Simard =

Louise Simard may refer to:

- Louise Simard (writer) (born 1950), author in Quebec, Canada
- Louise Simard (politician) (born 1947), Canadian politician and lawyer
