= André Major =

Canadian writer from Quebec (born 1942)

- Born: April 22, 1942 (age 84); Montreal, Quebec, Canada
- Occupations: novelist, poet
- Writing career
- Period: 1960s–present
- Notable work: Les Rescapés
- Notable awards: Governor General's Award for French-language fiction (1976); Prix Athanase-David (1992)

André Major (born April 22, 1942) is a Canadian writer from Quebec. He is most noted for his novel Les Rescapés, which won the Governor General's Award for French-language fiction at the 1976 Governor General's Awards. He was later nominated in the same category at the 1987 Governor General's Awards for L'Hiver au cœur and at the 1995 Governor General's Awards for La Vie provisoire, and for the Governor General's Award for French-language non-fiction at the 2008 Governor General's Awards for L'Esprit vagabond.

A poet in the early 1960s, he was a founding member alongside Paul Chamberland, André Brochu, Pierre Maheu and Jean-Marc Piotte of the political and cultural magazine Parti pris in 1963. In his early career he also wrote a number of radio and stage plays and numerous short stories. He also worked as a radio producer for Radio-Canada.

He was awarded the Prix Athanase-David in 1992.

His most recent novel, À quoi ça rime?, was published in 2013.

== Works ==
- Le Froid se meurt (1961)
- Holocauste à 2 voix (1961)
- Le Cabochon (1964)
- Poèmes pour durer (1969)
- Le Désir and Le Perdant, pièces radiophoniques (1973)
- La chair de poule (1973)
- L'Épouvantail (1974)
- L'Épidémie (1975)
- Une Soirée en octobre (1975)
- Les Rescapés (1976)
- L'Hiver au cœur (1987)
- Histoires de déserteurs (1991)
- La Vie provisoire (1995)
- La Folle d'Elvis (1997)
- Le Vent du diable (1998)
- Le Sourire d'Anton ou L'Adieu au roman (2001)
- Nous ferons nos comptes plus tard : correspondance (1962-1983) / Jacques Ferron et André Major (2004)
- L'Esprit vagabond (2007)
- Prendre le large. Carnets 1995-2000 (2012)
- À Quoi ça rime? (2013)
