= Gérald Tougas =

Canadian writer (1933–2019)

Gérald Tougas (1933 – 1 October 2019) was a Canadian writer, who won the Governor General's Award for French-language fiction at the 1990 Governor General's Awards for his debut novel, La Mauvaise foi.

Originally from Manitoba, he spent much of his adult life in Quebec teaching at the CEGEP level. Following his award win, he served on the French-language fiction jury for the 1993 Governor General's Awards.

He published the short story collection La clef de sol et autres récits in 1996, and the novel Le deuxième train de la nuit in 2013. Le deuxième train de la nuit was a shortlisted Governor General's Award finalist at the 2013 Governor General's Awards. Rachelle Renaud received an honourable mention from the John Glassco Translation Prize for Any Mail? and Other Stories, the English-language translation of La clef de sol. He died on 1 October 2019.
