= 1987 Governor General's Awards =

Canadian literary award

Each winner of the 1987 Governor General's Awards for Literary Merit received $5000 and a medal from the Governor General of Canada. The winners and nominees were selected by a panel of judges administered by the Canada Council for the Arts.

The Governor General's Awards for Literary Merit nominally increased in number from 8 in 1986 to 14 in 1987, with the addition of four awards for children's book writing and illustration and two awards for translation. The four Children's Literature awards, however, were simply the four annual Canada Council Children's Literature Prizes (1975 to 1986) under a new name.

== English ==
Category	Winner	Nominated
Fiction	M. T. Kelly, A Dream Like Mine	David Gurr, The Ring Master; Rohinton Mistry, Tales from Firozsha Baag; Michael Ondaatje, In the Skin of a Lion; Carol Shields, Swann: A Mystery
Non-fiction	Michael Ignatieff, The Russian Album	Janice Kulyk Keefer, Under Eastern Eyes; P. K. Page, Brazilian Journal
Poetry	Gwendolyn MacEwen, Afterworlds	Di Brandt, Questions I Asked My Mother; Roy Kiyooka, Pear Tree Pomes; Sharon Thesen, The Beginning of the Long Dash
Drama	John Krizanc, Prague	Wendy Lill, The Occupation of Heather Rose; Michael D.C. McKinlay, Walt and Roy; Sharon Pollock, Whiskey Six Cadenza
Children's literature	Morgan Nyberg, Galahad Schwartz and the Cockroach Army	Welwyn Wilton Katz, False Face; Donn Kushner, A Book Dragon; Russell McRae, Going to the Dogs
Children's illustration	Marie-Louise Gay, Rainy Day Magic	John Bianchi, Exploring the Night Sky; László Gál, The Enchanted Tapestry; Shawn Steffler, Flights of Magic
French to English translation	Patricia Claxton, Enchantment and Sorrow: The Autobiography of Gabrielle Roy	Sheila Fischman, Heartbreaks Along the Road; Anthony Martin-Sperry, Languages and Their Territories; Patricia Sillers, The Dragon and Other Laurentian Tales

== French ==
Category	Winner	Nominated
Fiction	Gilles Archambault, L'obsédante obèse et autres agressions	André Major, L'Hiver au coeur; Jacques Marchand, Premier mouvement; Francine Noël, Myriam première
Non-fiction	Jean Larose, La petite noirceur	Lise Bissonnette, La passion du présent; Marcel Trudel, Mémoire d'un autre siècle
Poetry	Fernand Ouellette, Les Heures	Hugues Corriveau, Mobiles; Normand de Bellefeuille, Heureusement, ici il y à la guerre; Gérald Godin, Ils ne demandaient qu'à brûler
Drama	Jeanne-Mance Delisle, Un oiseau vivant dans la gueule	Suzanne Aubry, La Nuit des p'tits couteaux; Marie Laberge, Oublier; Michel Tremblay, Le vrai monde?
Children's literature	David Schinkel and Yves Beauchesne, Le Don	Ginette Anfousse, Les catastrophes de Rosalie; Denis Côté, Nocturnes pour Jessie; Vincent Lauzon, Le pays à l'envers
Children's illustration	Darcia Labrosse, Venir au monde	Hélène Desputeaux, Bonne fête Madeleine; Stéphane Poulin, Les animaux en hiver; Gilles Tibo, Annabel Lee
English to French translation	Ivan Steenhout and Christiane Teasdale, L'Homme qui se croyait aimé	Jean-Pierre Fournier, Jacob Deux-Deux et le dinosaure; Ivan Steenhout, La couleur du sang; Claudine Vivier, La Dialectique de la reproduction
