= Andrée Laberge =

Canadian researcher and writer

Andrée Laberge (born 1953) is a Quebec researcher and writer.

She was born in Quebec City and earned a master's degree in social work and a PhD in epidemiology. She worked as a social worker and then as a public health researcher before turning to writing. She received the Governor General's Award for French-language fiction in 2006 for her novel La rivière du loup; it was also a finalist for the Prix Ringuet from the Académie des lettres du Québec, the Prix des libraires du Québec and the Prix des cinq continents de la francophonie.

== Selected works ==
- Le fin fond de l'histoire (2008)
- Le fil ténu de l'âme (2012)
