= Andrée A. Michaud =

Canadian novelist and playwright

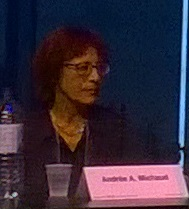
- Andrée A. Michaud photographed in Montréal, Québec, Canada at the salon du livre de Montréal 2017.
- Born: November 12, 1957 (age 68); Saint-Sébastien-de-Frontenac, Quebec
- Occupations: novelist, playwright
- Writing career
- Period: 1980s-present
- Notable works: Le ravissement (2001); Bondrée (2013)

Andrée A. Michaud (born November 12, 1957) is a Canadian novelist and playwright from Quebec. She is a two-time winner of the Governor General's Award for French-language fiction, for Le ravissement at the 2001 Governor General's Awards and for Bondrée at the 2014 Governor General's Awards, and won the Prix Ringuet in 2007 for Mirror Lake. Boundary, translated by Donald Winkler, was longlisted for the 2017 Scotiabank Giller Prize.

She is a graduate of the Université du Québec à Montréal. In addition to her published novels, she has also written the plays Un paysage / Eine Landshaft / A Landscape and Cette petite chose for Quebec's Productions Recto-Verso theatre company.

== Bibliography ==
- ——. La femme de Sath. Montréal: Québec-Amérique. ISBN 2890373304.
- ——. Portraits d'après modèles. Montréal: Les Éditions du Boréal. ISBN 9782760931404.
- ——. Alias Charlie. Montréal: Les Éditions du Boréal. ISBN 9782760931619.
- ——. Les derniers jours de Noah Eisenbaum. Montréal: Les Éditions du Boréal. ISBN 9782895021087.
- ——. Le ravissement. Montréal: Les Éditions du Boréal. ISBN 9782895021759.
- ——. Le Pendu de Trempes. Montréal: Les Éditions du Boréal. ISBN 9782764403761.
- ——. Mirror Lake. Montréal: Les Éditions du Boréal. ISBN 9782764405109.
- ——. Lazy Bird. Paris: Éditions de l'Olivier. ISBN 9782021022995.
- ——. Rivière Tremblante. Montréal: Les Éditions du Boréal. ISBN 9782764409527.
- ——. Bondrée. Montréal: Les Éditions du Boréal. ISBN 9782764425053.
- ——. Routes secondaires. Montréal: Les Éditions du Boréal. ISBN 9782764432273.
- ——. Tempêtes. Montréal: Les Éditions du Boréal. ISBN 9782764433607.
- ——. Proies. Montréal: Les Éditions du Boréal. ISBN 9782764433614.

== Awards and honours ==
- 2001: Governor General's Award for French-language fiction for Le ravissement
- 2001: Prix littéraire des collégiennes et des collégiens for Le ravissement
- 2007: Prix Ringuet for Mirror Lake
- 2009: Prix Coup de cœur du club du polar de la Bibliothèque Mathilde-Massé for Lazy Bird
- 2014: Prix Saint-Pacôme du roman policier for Bondrée
- 2014: Prix Coup de cœur du club du polar de la Bibliothèque Mathilde-Massé for Bondrée
- 2014: Governor General's Award for French-language fiction for Bondrée
- 2015: Arthur Ellis Award for Bondrée
- 2017: Prix des lecteurs Quais du polar/20 minutes for Bondrée
- 2017: Prix Rivages des libraires (France, Belgium and Switzerland) for Bondrée
- 2019: Prix SNCF du polar for Bondrée
- 2020: Arthur Ellis Award for Tempêtes
- 2024: Prix du Polar Moussa Konaté for Proies
