= Michael Delisle =

Canadian writer from Quebec

- Born: 1959 (age 66–67); Longueuil, Quebec
- Occupations: Novelist, poet, short stories
- Writing career
- Period: 1980s–present
- Notable works: Le sort de fille, Le Feu de mon père

Michael Delisle (born 1959 in Longueuil) is a Canadian writer from Quebec. He is a two-time nominee for the Governor General's Award for French-language fiction, for Le sort de fille at the 2006 Governor General's Awards and for Le Feu de mon père at the 2014 Governor General's Awards, and won the Grand prix du livre de Montréal in 2014 for Le Feu de mon père. He also received the Prix Émile-Nelligan for Fontainebleau in 1987 and the Prix Adrienne-Choquette for Le sort de Fille in 2005.

He is a professor of literature at the Cégep du Vieux Montréal.

== Works ==
- L'agrandissement (1980, ISBN 978-2-85920-078-7)
- Drame privé (1990, ISBN 978-2-86744-189-9)
- Helen avec un secret et autres nouvelles (1995, ISBN 978-2-7609-3183-1)
  - English translation Helen with a Secret (tr. Gail Scott)
- Long glissement (1996, ISBN 978-2-7609-1033-1)
- Le désarroi du matelot (1998, ISBN 978-2-7609-3205-0)
  - English translation The Sailor's Disquiet (tr. Gail Scott)
- Dée (2002, ISBN 978-2-89406-277-7)
- Le sort de Fille (2005, ISBN 978-2-7609-3269-2)
- Prière à blanc (2009, ISBN 978-2-89018-656-9)
- Tiroir No. 24 (2010, ISBN 9782764620366)
- Le Feu de mon père (2014, ISBN 978-2-7646-2294-0)
  - English translation Flame Out (tr. Kathryn Gabinet-Kroo)
