= Pierre Yergeau =

Canadian novelist

- Born: October 4, 1957 (age 68); Abitibi, Quebec, Canada
- Occupations: Novelist, short story, essay, theater play, poetry
- Writing career
- Language: French

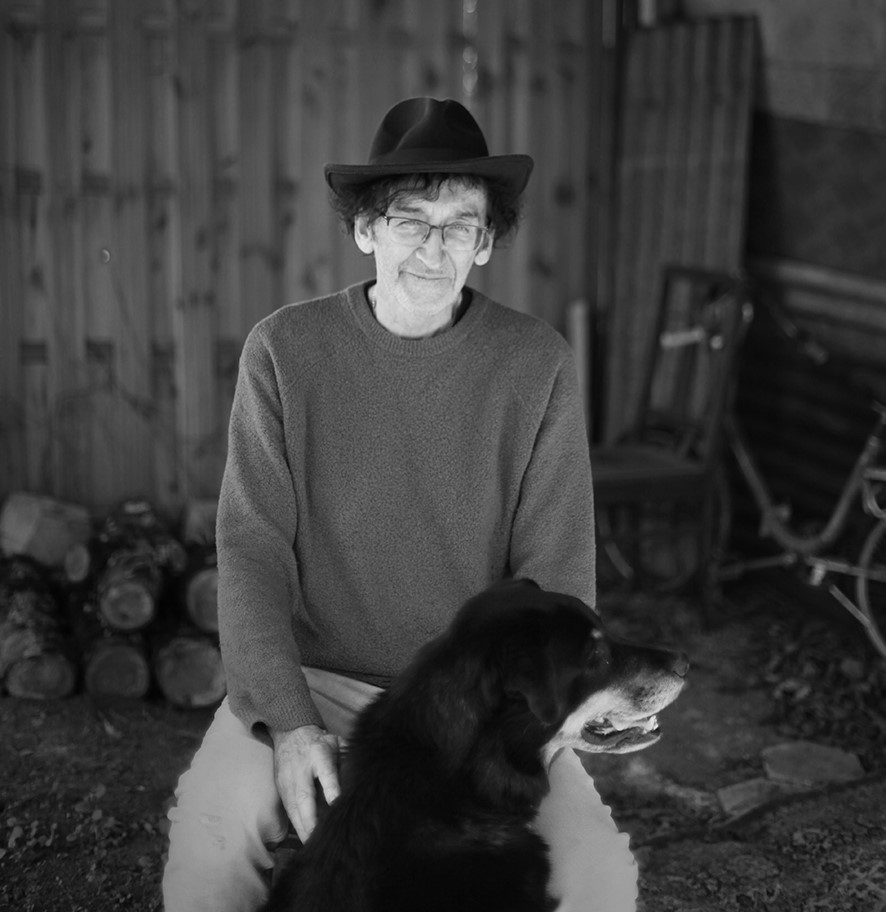
May 2025 with Élios, in his home in the suburb of Paris, photograph : Melania Avanzato

Pierre Yergeau (born October 4, 1957) is a Canadian novelist, who was a three-time nominee for the Governor General's Award for French-language fiction. He received a Mention spéciale from the Organisation internationale de la francophonie in 2006 for his novel La Cité des vents, the Prix Ringuet in 2005 for his novel Les amours perdues, and the Prix Hervé Foulon for L'Écrivain public in 2019. He also received the Prix du Signet d'Or for his first book, Tu attends la neige, Léonard?

He received Governor General's nominations at the 1993 Governor General's Awards for Tu attends la neige, Léonard?, at the 2002 Governor General's Awards for La désertion, and at the 2006 Governor General's Awards for La Cité des vents.

Born in Abitibi, Quebec, Yergeau was educated at Concordia University and the Université de Montréal.

His play on the famous French Writer Colette, Le Vent respire pour toi, was played by the comedian Macha Limonchik during the Festiva international de la littératurel at the Outremont Theatre in 2023.

He has published a book of poems, La théorie de l'existence, at the Éditions du Noroît on his wife who died in December 2020 from breast cancer.

Yergeau lives in Paris with his dog Élios.
