= Sylvie Laliberté =

Canadian artist

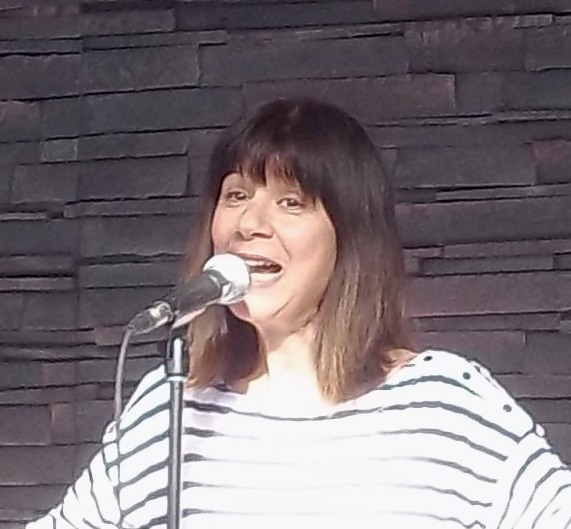
- Born: June 7, 1959 (age 65); Montreal, Quebec, Canada
- Occupation(s): Artist, photographer, musician
- Notable work: Oh la la du narratif

Sylvie Laliberté (born 1959) is a Canadian artist. She works in a variety of areas, including video art, performance art and music. Her work is included in the collections of the Musée national des beaux-arts du Québec, National Gallery of Canada and the Musée d'art contemporain de Montréal.

== Awards ==
- 1997 Rendez-vous Québec Cinéma: Quebec Film Critics Association (AQCC) award for best short film for Oh la la du narratif
- 1999 Prix Louis-Comtois for the City of Montreal and the Association of Contemporary Art Galleries
- 2021 Governor General's Award for French Language Fiction : Finalist for Jʼai montré toutes mes pattes blanches je nʼen ai plus
