= Larry Tremblay =

Canadian writer from Quebec (born 1954)

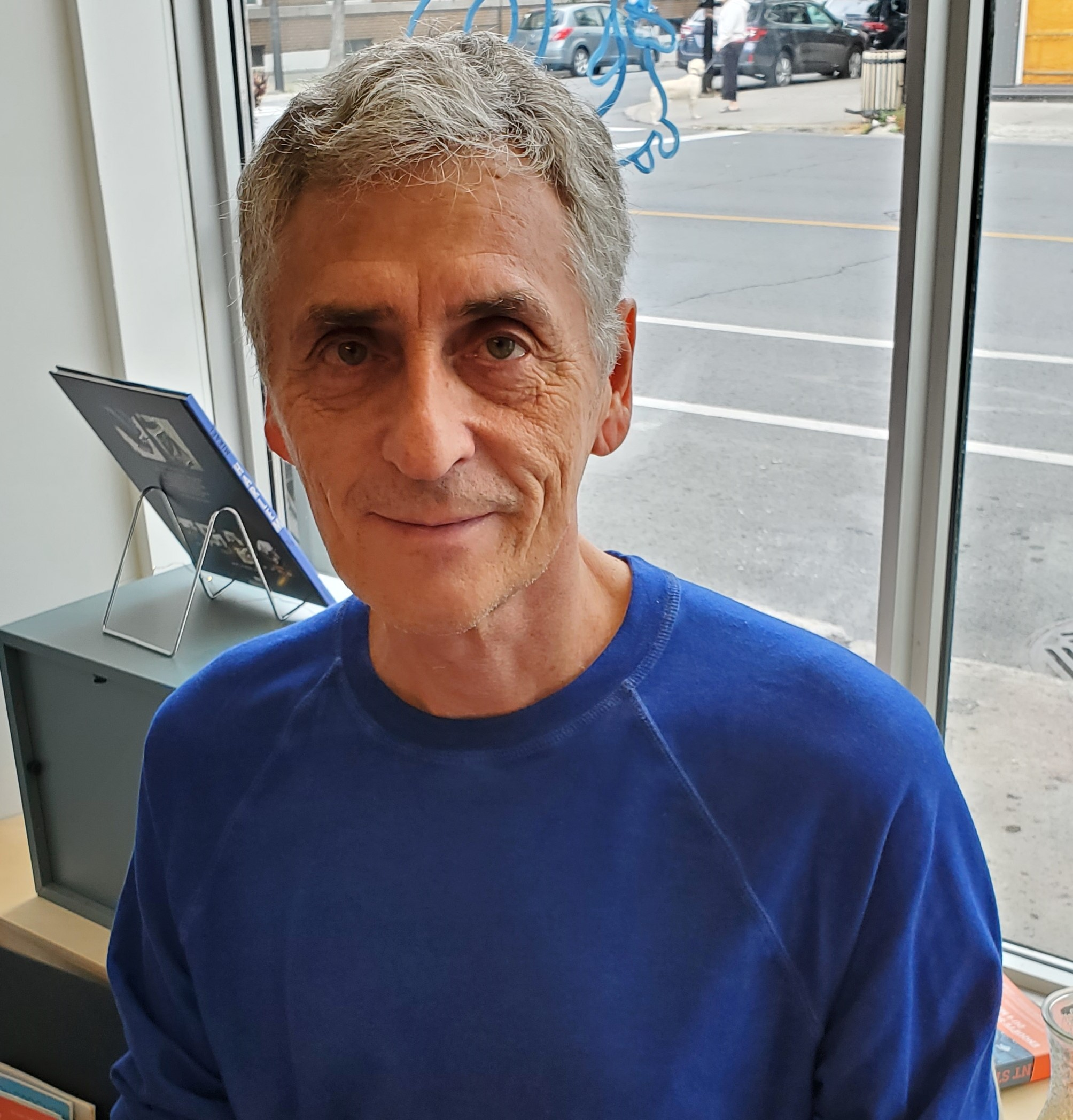
- Tremblay in 2022
- Born: April 17, 1954 (age 72); Chicoutimi, Quebec, Canada
- Occupations: Novelist, playwright, poet
- Writing career
- Period: 1980s–present
- Notable works: Le Mangeur de bicyclette, L'Orangeraie

Larry Tremblay (born April 17, 1954) is a Canadian writer from Quebec. He is a two-time nominee for the Governor General's Award for French-language fiction, for Le Mangeur de bicyclette at the 2003 Governor General's Awards and for L'Orangeraie at the 2014 Governor General's Awards, and a nominee for the Governor General's Award for French-language drama at the 1997 Governor General's Awards for the published compilation of his plays Ogre and Cornemuse.

Several of his works have also been published in English translations by Sheila Fischman, Linda Gaboriau, Keith Turnbull and Chantal Bilodeau. The Bicycle Eater, Fischman's translation of Le Mangeur de bicyclette, was also a nominee for the Governor General's Award for French to English translation at the 2006 Governor General's Awards.

After completing a doctorate in theatre at the Université du Québec à Montréal, he travelled to India to study kathakali, which has remained an influence on his writing. Many of his plays focus on characters confronting psychological trauma. In Le Déclic du destin, a character progressively loses body parts; in The Dragonfly of Chicoutimi, the central character recovers from aphasia only to learn that while recovering his ability to speak he has lost his native language; and in La Hache a university professor is driven insane by his obsession with ideological purity in literature.

Tremblay has also taught acting at the Université du Québec à Montréal.

== Works ==
=== Plays ===
- 8 opérations (1978)
- La Femme aux peupliers (1982)
- Le Déclic du destin (1988)
- Josse est-il parti? (1989)
- Leçon d'anatomie (1992)
- The Dragonfly of Chicoutimi (1993)
- Le Génie de la rue Drolet (1994)
- Ogre (1995)
- Cornemuse (1996)
- Éloge de la paresse (1997)
- Tibullus ou Trois fois le prix d'un coq (1997)
- Téléroman (1997)
- Les Mains bleues (1997)
- Les Huit péchés capitaux (éloges) (1997)
- Roller (2000)
- Le Ventriloque (2001)
  - English translation The Ventriloquist (2006)
- Panda Panda (2004)
- La Hache (2005)
- A Chair in Love (2005)
- Abraham Lincoln va au théâtre (2005)
  - English translation Abraham Lincoln Goes to the Theatre (2010)
- L'Histoire d'un cœur (2006)
- Le Problème avec moi (2007)
- Cantate de guerre (2009)
  - English translation War Cantata (2014)
- Burger Love (2009)
- L'Enfant matière (2012)
- Grande écoute (2015)

=== Fiction ===
- Le Mangeur de bicyclette (2002)
  - English translation The Bicycle Eater (2005)
- Piercing (2006)
  - English translation Piercing (2010)
- Le Christ obèse (2012)
  - English translation The Obese Christ (2014)
- L'Orangeraie (2013)
- L'Arbre aux livre. 2017 online only, Full text
  - The book tree. Granta, # 141, 2017 in English Transl. Sheila Fischman

=== Poetry ===
- La Place des yeux : poèmes (1989)
- Gare à l'aube
- Trois secondes où la Seine n'a pas coulé (2001)
- L'Œil du soir (2009)
- L'Arbre chorégraphe (2009)
- L'Œil soldat (2019)

=== Essays ===
- Le Crâne des théâtres : essais sur les corps de l'acteur (1993)
