= Madeleine Ouellette-Michalska =

Canadian writer from Quebec (born 1930)

Madeleine Ouellette-Michalska (born May 27, 1930) is a Canadian writer from Quebec.

== Early life and education ==
Ouellette-Michalska was born in Saint-Alexandre-de-Kamouraska, Quebec. She studied arts at the Université de Montréal, the Université du Québec and the Université de Sherbrooke, where she received a PhD degree in 1987.

== Career ==
Ouellette-Michalska began writing professionally in the 1960s. One of her well-known works is the 1984 novel La Maison Trestler, a work of historical fiction. Her diary, La Tentation de dire, was published in 1985 and broadcast on CBC Radio-Canada.

As well as fiction, Ouellette-Michalska also published a number of essays, including L'Amour de la carte postale in 1987. She has contributed as a journalist to publications such as Perspectives and Le Devoir.

Ouellette-Michalska's sixth novel, L'Ete de l'ile de grace, won the 1993 France-Quebec literary prize.

== Works ==
- 1968: Dôme, short story
- 1979 : La Femme de sable, 112 pages, ISBN 978-2892950151
  (also translated into English as The Sandwoman, 112 pages, ISBN 978-0920717240)
- 1981 : Entre le souffle et l'aine, poetry, 156 pages, ISBN 978-2890180543
- 1981 : L'Échappée de discours de l'œil, essay, 344 pages, ISBN 978-2892950410
- 1984 : La Maison Trestler, ou Le 8e jour d'Amérique, novel. ISBN 978-2890371958
  (also translated by W. Donald Wilson into English as The Trestler House, 300 pages, ISBN 978-1550712773)
- 1985 : La Tentation de dire ("The temptation of saying"), diary, 172 pages. ISBN 978-2890372450
- 1987 : L'Amour de la carte postale: Impérialisme culturel et différence ("Postcard love"), essay, 260 pages, ISBN 978-2890373327
  Le Plat de lentilles ("Lentil dish"), novel, ISBN 978-2891510004
  La Danse de l'amante ("Lover's dance"), theatre, 64 pages, ISBN 978-2890240513
- 1989 : La fête du désir, novel, 149 pages. ISBN 978-2890374911
- 1990 : La termitière, 150 pages, ISBN 978-2890053441
- 1992 : Léo-Paul Tremblé, biography
- 1993 : L'Été de l'île de Grâce ("The summer of Grace's Island"), novel, 280 pages. ISBN 978-2892951820
- 1997 : La Passagère ("The passenger"), novel, 192 pages, ISBN 978-2890379213
- 1999 : Les Sept Nuits de Laura ("Laura's seven nights"), novel, 123 pages, ISBN 978-2890241305
- 2000 : L'Amérique un peu ("A little bit of America"), poems
- 2002 : Le Cycle des migrations ("Cycle of migrations"), poems, ISBN 978-2890184947
- 2006 : L'Apprentissage ("The apprenticeship"), novel, 138 pages, ISBN 978-2892614640.
- 2007 : Autofiction et dévoilement de soi ("Self-fiction and self-unveiling"), essay, 156 pages. ISBN 978-2892614862
- 2010 : Imaginaire sans frontières: Les lieux de l'écriture, 216 pages, ISBN 978-2892615708
- 2012 : La Parlante d'outre-mer, 200 pages. ISBN 978-2892616996

== Prizes ==
- 1981 - Winner, Governor General's Award for French-language non-fiction for L'échappée des discours de l'oeil
- 1984 - Finalist, Governor General's Award for French-language fiction for La Maison Trestler
- 1984 - Winner, Prix Molson du roman for La Maison Trestler ou le 8ème jour d'Amérique
- 1985 - Inducted into the Académie des lettres du Québec
- 1993 - Prix Jean-Hamelin, L'Été de l'île de Grâce
- 1993 - Prix Arthur-Buies
- 1998 - Gold Medal from the Renaissance française
- 2002 - Grand Prix littéraire de la Montérégie
