= Marie-Françoise Guédon =

Canadian anthropologist

Marie-Françoise Guédon is a Canadian anthropologist and professor of religious studies at the University of Ottawa. She has done fieldwork among the Inuit, Gitksan, Ahtna, and Tanana peoples of Canada and Alaska.

Guédon is the daughter of French Resistance fighters Robert Guedon and Reine Guedon. She was a student of the anthropologist Frederica de Laguna, with whom she later did fieldwork in Alaska in 1968.

Guédon's 2005 book, Le rêve et la forêt: histoires de chamanes nabesna (The Dream and the Forest), published by Laval University Press, was nominated for the 2006 Governor General's Award for French non-fiction.

Guédon is also a director of the International Network for Training, Education, and Research on Culture. She has written extensively on North American world views and shamanism.

== Sources ==
- Mauzé, Marie, Michael E. Harkin, and Sergei Kan (eds.) (2004) Coming to Shore: Northwest Coast Ethnology, Traditions, and Visions. Lincoln: University of Nebraska Press.
