= Diane Schoemperlen =

Canadian novelist and short story writer

Diane Mavis Schoemperlen (born July 9, 1954) is a Canadian novelist and short story writer.

== Early life and education ==
Schoemperlen was born in Thunder Bay, Ontario, and educated at Lakehead University.

== Career ==
Schoemperlen's first novel, In the Language of Love, was published in 1994; it is composed of one hundred chapters, each one based on one of the one hundred words in the Standard Word Association Test, which was used to measure sanity. There are chapters titled "Table," "Slow," "Cabbage," and "Scissors." New York Times reviewer Jay Parini pronounced Schoemperlen "a novelist of real promise".

Schoemperlen's 1998 book of short stories, Forms of Devotion, won the Governor General's Award. In her second novel, Our Lady of the Lost and Found (2001), the narrator is visited by the Virgin Mary, and the two women spend one week cooking, cleaning, and shopping.

Schoemperlen's 2017 book, This is Not My Life, tells of her love for a prison inmate.

== Bibliography ==
- Double Exposures, 1984 (ISBN 0-88910-280-5)
- Frogs & Other Stories, 1986 (ISBN 0-919627-38-2)
- Hockey Night in Canada, 1987 (ISBN 0-919627-56-0)
- The Man of My Dreams, 1990 (ISBN 0-7715-9973-0)
- Hockey Night in Canada & Other Stories, 1991 (ISBN 1-55082-003-6)
- In the Language of Love: A Novel in 100 Chapters, 1994 (ISBN 0-00-224373-3)
- Forms of Devotion, 1998 (ISBN 0-670-87696-8)
- Our Lady of the Lost and Found, 2001 (ISBN 0-14-200132-5)
- Red Plaid Shirt, 2002 (ISBN 0-00-200518-2)
- Names of the Dead : An Elegy for the Victims of September 11, 2004 (ISBN 0-670-03325-1)
- At a Loss for Words, 2008 (ISBN 978-0-00-200881-5)
- By the Book: Stories and Pictures, 2014 (ISBN 978-1-927428-81-8)
- This Is Not My Life: A Memoir of Love, Prison, and Other Complications, 2016 (ISBN 978-1-44343-420-1)
- First Things First, 2016 (ISBN 978-1-77196-070-0)

== Awards and nominations ==
- 1990 Governor General's Award for English Fiction: The Man of My Dreams (nominee)
- 1994 Books in Canada First Novel Award: In the Language of Love (nominee)
- 1998 Governor General's Award for English Fiction: Forms of Devotion (winner)
- 2007 Marian Engel Award (winner)
- 2017 Matt Cohen Award (winner)
