= Gabriel Marcoux-Chabot =

Gabriel Marcoux-Chabot (born 1982 in Saint-Nérée-de-Bellechasse) is a Canadian writer based in Saguenay, Quebec. He is most noted for his novel Godpèle, which was a shortlisted finalist for the Governor General's Award for French-language fiction at the 2026 Governor General's Awards.

An instructor at the Cégep de Jonquière, he previously won the Prix Ringuet in 2016 for his novel Tas-d'roches.

== Works ==
=== Fiction ===
- Tas-d'roches - 2016
- La Scouine - 2018
- Godpèle - 2025

=== Poetry ===
- Le rire du fou - 2011
- L'existence acrostiche - 2015

=== Drama ===
- Il tombe des anges, drame poétique pour comédiens de chair et de bois - 2007
