= Francine Noël =

Canadian writer (born 1945)

Francine Noël (born 1945 in Montreal, Quebec) is a Canadian writer, whose 2005 work La Femme de ma vie won the 2006 edition of Première Chaîne's Le Combat des livres.

She teaches theatre at the Université du Québec à Montréal.

== Awards and nominations ==
She was a nominee for the Governor General's Award for French language fiction in the 1983 Governor General's Awards for Maryse, and in the 1987 Governor General's Awards for Myriam première. She was a nominee for the Governor General's Award for French language drama in the 1985 Governor General's Awards for Chandeleur.

== Works ==
- Maryse (1983)
- Chandeleur: Cantate parlée pour cinq voix et un mort (1985)
- Myriam première (1987)
- Nous avons tous découvert l'Amérique (1992)
- La Conjuration des bâtards (1999)
- La Femme de ma vie (2005)
- J'ai l'angoisse légère (2008)
- L'usage de mes jours (Leméac, 2020)
