= Martine Delvaux =

Canadian writer from Quebec

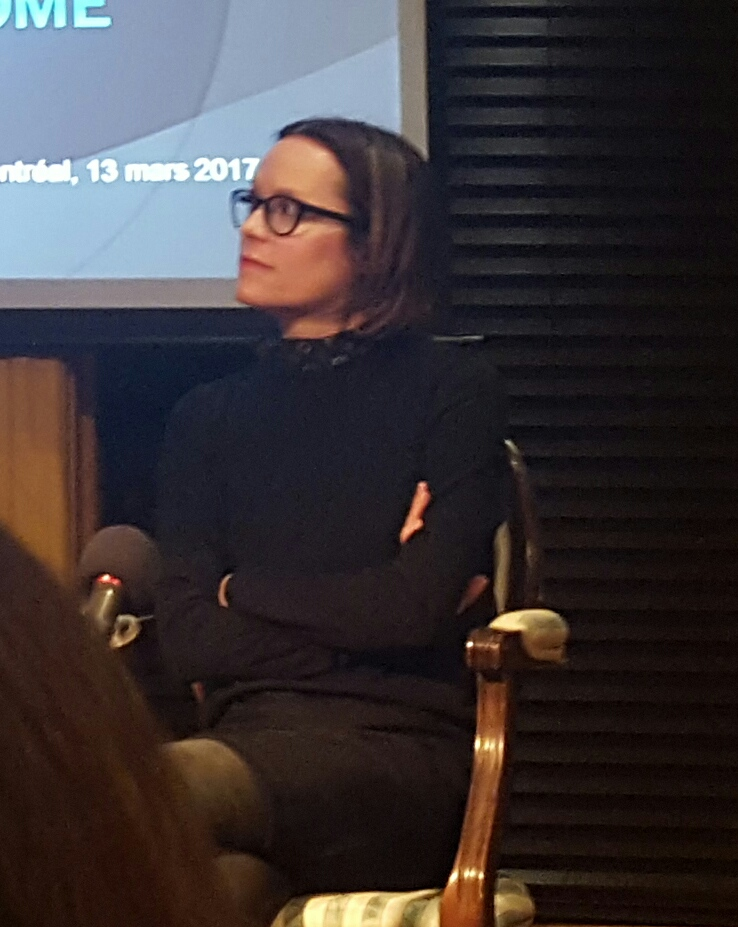
- Born: December 10, 1968 (age 57); Quebec City, Quebec, Canada
- Education: University of Ottawa, University of Michigan
- Occupations: Writer, essayist, academic
- Writing career
- Language: French
- Genres: Fiction, essays
- Subject: Feminism
- Notable works: Blanc dehors, Le boys club, Ça aurait pu être un film
- Notable awards: Grand Prix du livre de Montréal (2020)

Martine Delvaux (born December 10, 1968) is a Canadian writer, essayist, and academic from Quebec. She is best known for her 2015 novel Blanc dehors, which was a shortlisted finalist for the Governor General's Award for French-language fiction and the Prix des libraires du Québec in 2016. Her 2020 essay Le boys club won the Grand Prix du livre de Montréal, and her 2023 book Ça aurait pu être un film, centered on Hollis Jeffcoat, Joan Mitchell, and Jean-Paul Riopelle, was a finalist for the Prix Médicis essai.

== Biography ==
Born in Quebec City and raised in the Outaouais, Delvaux later lived in the United States and England. She studied French literature at the University of Ottawa and completed a doctorate in French literature at the University of Michigan. After teaching at the University of Southampton, she joined the Université du Québec à Montréal, where she teaches in the Department of Literary Studies. Her fiction and essays often address feminism, stereotypes, and the transmission of women's voices.

== Works ==
=== Fiction ===
- Ventriloquies (2003, with Catherine Mavrikakis)
- Échographies (2007)
- C'est quand le bonheur? (2007)
- Rose amer (2009)
- Les Cascadeurs de l'amour n'ont pas droit au doublage (2012)
- Blanc dehors (2015)
- Ça aurait pu être un film (2023)
- Il faut beaucoup aimer les femmes qui pleurent (2025)

=== Non-fiction ===
- Femmes psychiatrisées, femmes rebelles. De l'étude de cas à la narration autobiographique (1998)
- Histoire de fantômes. Spectralité et témoignage dans les récits de femmes contemporains (2006)
- Les Filles en série. Des Barbies aux Pussy Riot (2013)
- Nan Goldin. Guerrière et gorgone (2014)
- Le monde est à toi (2017)
- Thelma, Louise et moi (2018)
- Le boys club (2020)
- Je n'en ai jamais parlé à personne (2020)
- Pompières et pyromanes (2021)
- Les allongées (2022, with Jennifer Bélanger)

== Honours ==
- Shortlisted for the Governor General's Award for French-language fiction for Blanc dehors (2016)
- Shortlisted for the Prix des libraires du Québec for Blanc dehors (2016)
- Winner of the Grand Prix du livre de Montréal for Le boys club (2020)
- Finalist for the Prix Médicis essai for Ça aurait pu être un film (2024)
