= Martine Desjardins (writer) =

Canadian journalist, columnist and writer

Martine Desjardins (born 1957) is a Canadian writer from Quebec. She is most noted for her 2005 novel L'Évocation, which was the winner of the Prix Ringuet in 2006, and her 2009 novel Maleficium, which was a Governor General's Literary Award finalist for French-language fiction at the 2010 Governor General's Awards.

Fred A. Reed and David Homel won the Governor General's Award French to English Translation at the 2001 Governor General's Awards for Fairy Ring, their translation of Desjardins' Le Cercle de Clara, and were nominated at the 2005 Governor General's Awards for All That Glitters, their translation of Desjardins' L'Élu du hasard.

Medusa, an English translation by Oana Avasilichioaei of her 2020 novel Méduse, is slated for publication in 2022.

== Works ==
- Le Cercle de Clara, 1997
- L’Élu du hasard, 2003
- L’Évocation, 2005
- Maleficium, 2009
- La Chambre verte, 2016
- Méduse, 2020
- Le revenant de Rigaud, 2021
