= Yakov M. Rabkin =

Canadian historian

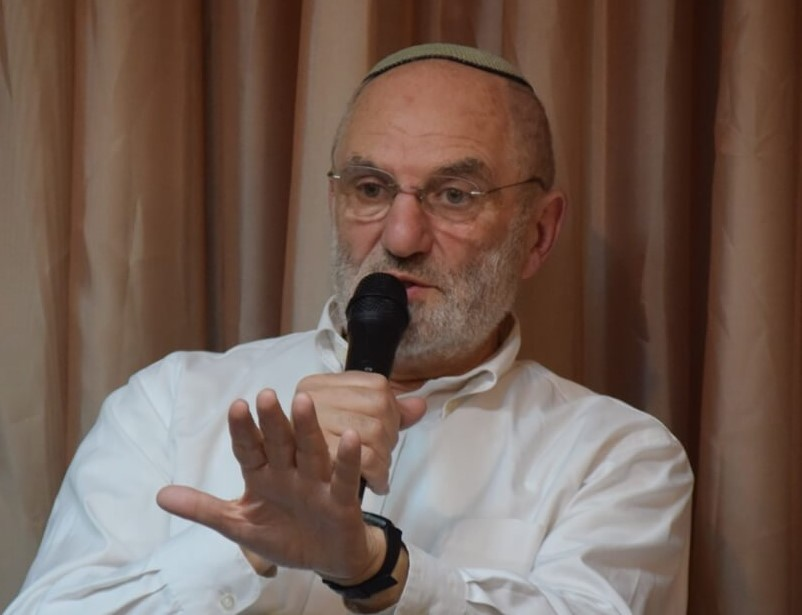
Yakov M. Rabkin

Yakov M. Rabkin (born 29 September 1945) is a professor emeritus of history in the Université de Montréal, author and public intellectual. His published works include studies of relations between science and technology, research on cultural aspects of science, including studies of Jews in the scientific profession, Science Between the Superpowers (Priority Press), a study of programs for the exchange of U.S and Soviet Union scientists, as well as works on the fate of Soviet science and scientists after the dismemberment of the USSR and, more generally, on science and political freedoms. As a result of his graduate seminar on demodernization and an international conference he organized in Nice in 2016, he co-edited Demodernization: a Future in the Past, a multidisciplinary volume on reverses of modernity as a global phenomenon at the turn of the 21st century.

Professor Rabkin has also contributed to the fields of Jewish and Israel studies. His book A Threat from Within: A Century of Jewish Opposition to Zionism was nominated for best French to English translation for "an important and timely work" at the 2006 Governor General's Awards. It has also been listed as one of the three best books of the year by Japan's leading daily Asahi Shimbun in 2010. This book is currently available in fourteen languages. He later published What Is Modern Israel? which has also appeared in French, Japanese and Russian. It examines what he calls the "Protestant origins" of the Zionist project (an allusion to Max Weber's 'The Protestant Ethic and the Spirit of Capitalism'); the adoption of that project in the late 19th century by secular Jews from Central and Eastern Europe, imbued with the ethnic nationalism of the time; the stern resistance Zionism faced from Jews around the world, not least in the Holy Land; and the ongoing Jewish opposition to Zionism from different perspectives, both religious and secular.

Rabkin is a frequent contributor to printed and electronic media on international relations, Russia and the former USSR as well as contemporary Israel. He has argued for freedom of discussion, against political uses of history and shown skepticism with respect to a two-state solution for the Israel/Palestine conflict. He has expressed support for a bi-national state. He has done consulting work on science and higher education for national and international organizations, including UNESCO, NATO, OECD and the World Bank.

== Books ==
- Science between the Superpowers (A Twentieth Century Fund paper), Université de Montréal: Priority Press, 1988.
- A Threat from Within. A Century of Jewish Opposition to Zionism. Translation from French by Fred A. Reed with Yakov M. Rabkin, Fernwood Publishing, Blackpoint, Nova Scotia; Zed Books, London (available in fifteen languages)
- What is Modern Israel?. University of Chicago: Pluto Press, 2016 (published in English, French, Italian, Japanese and Russian)
- Judaïsme, islam et modernité.
- Interactions between Jewish and Scientific Cultures.
- Demodernization: A Future in the Past.
- Israel In Palestine – Jewish Rejection of Zionism, Aspect Editions, September, 2025. ISBN 979-8-9916552-9-3; eBook Edition ISBN 979-8-9916552-8-6 (published in French, Japanese and Spanish)
- Le sionisme en 101 citations. Editions i Littérature, 2025. ISBN 978-2-37650-194-7. Also published in Russian as: Сионизм в 101 цитате. Москва: Ноократия, 2025. ISBN 978-5-908075-28-2
- Zionism Decoded in 101 Quotes. Baraka Books, 2026 (published in English, French and Russian). ISBN 9781771864121
