= Noël Audet =

Canadian poet and writer

Noël Audet (December 23, 1938 – December 29, 2005) was a Canadian novelist and poet from Quebec. He is most noted as a two-time nominee for the Governor General's Award for French-language fiction, receiving nominations at the 1981 Governor General's Awards for Ah, l'amour l'amour, and at the 1988 Governor General's Awards for L'Ombre de l'épervier.

Born in Maria, Quebec, he published two books of poetry in the 1960s before publishing his debut short story collection Quand la voile faseille in 1980. L'Ombre de l'épervier, his most successful novel, was published in 1988 and was adapted into a television series for Télévision de Radio-Canada in 1998.

Le Roi des planeurs, the final novel published before Audet's death, was released in 2005. One further novel, Entre la boussole et l'étoile, was published posthumously in 2006.

In addition to his writing, Audet was a longtime professor at the Université du Québec à Montréal.

== Works ==
- 1963: Figures parallèles
- 1968: La Tête barbare
- 1968: Quand la voile faseille
- 1981: Ah, l'amour l'amour
- 1984: Dix nouvelles humoristiques
- 1984: La Parade
- 1987: Ah, l'amour l'amour
- 1988: Premier Amour
- 1988: L'Ombre de l'épervier
- 1989: Rencontres/encuentros
- 1990: Écrire de la fiction au Québec
- 1991: Une douzaine de treize, superstitions gaspésiennes
- 1992: Nouvelles de Montréal
- 1992: L'Eau blanche
- 1995: Frontières ou Tableaux d'Amérique
- 1996: Xylon deux
- 1998: La Terre promise
- 2000: Récits de la fête
- 2000: La Maison du rêve
- 2002: Les Bonheurs d'un héros incertain
- 2002: Ce qu'il nous reste de liberté
- 2005: Le Roi des planeurs
- 2006: Entre la boussole et l'étoile
