= Carole Massé =

Canadian writer

Carole Massé (born 1949) is a Quebec writer.

She was born in Montreal and studied literature at the Université du Québec à Montréal. She has worked as an editor.

== Selected works ==
- Rejet, poetry (1975)
- Dieu, novel (1979)
- L'autre, poetry (1984)
- L'Existence, novel (1984), finalist for a Governor General's Award for French-language fiction
- Nobody, novel (1985)
- Je vous aime, poetry (1986)
- Hommes, novel (1987), finalist for the Grands Prix of the Journal de Montréal
- Los, poetry (1988)
- La mémoire dérobée, poetry (1997), received the Prix Alfred-DesRochers
- L'Ennemi, novel (1998), finalist for a Governor General's Literary Award
- Secrets et pardons, novel (2007)
- L'arrivée au monde, novel (2010)
