= Sergio Kokis =

Canadian writer from Quebec (born 1944)

- Born: May 6, 1944 (age 82); Rio de Janeiro, Brazil
- Occupations: Novelist, short story writer
- Writing career
- Period: 1990s-present
- Notable works: Le Pavillon des miroirs, Les amants d'Alfama, Culs-de-sac

Sergio Kokis (born May 6, 1944) is a Canadian writer from Quebec. He is a two-time nominee for the Governor General's Award for French-language fiction, for Les amants d'Alfama at the 2004 Governor General's Awards and for Culs-de-sac at the 2013 Governor General's Awards, and won the Prix Molson and the Prix Québec-Paris in 1994 for Le Pavillon des miroirs.

== Biography ==
Born and raised in Brazil, Kokis studied philosophy and psychology, but fled the country after the overthrow of President João Goulart in the 1964 Brazilian coup d'état. He moved to Quebec in 1969, working as a clinical psychologist at various hospitals in Montreal and studying various arts disciplines at the Montreal Museum of Fine Arts' School of Art and Design and the Saidye Bronfman Centre for the Arts.

He published his first novel, Le Pavillon des miroirs, in 1994, and retired from his professional pursuits in 1997 to devote himself exclusively to writing and painting.

As a writer, Kokis has primarily published novels, although he has also published several collections of short stories and a volume of poetry.

== Works ==
- Le Pavillon des miroirs (1994)
- Negão et Doralice (1995)
- Errances (1996)
- L'Art du maquillage (1997)
- Un Sourire blindé (1998)
- La Danse macabre du Québec (1999)
- Le Maître de jeu (1999)
- Saltimbanques (2000)
- Kaléidoscope brisé (2001)
- Le Magicien (2002)
- Les Amants de l'Alfama (2003)
- L'Amour du lointain (2004)
- La Gare (2005)
- Le Fou de Bosch (2006)
- Le Retour de Lorenzo Sanchez (2008)
- Dissimulations (2010)
- Clandestino (2010)
- Amerika (2011)
- Culs-de-sac (2013)
- Makarius (2014)
- Le Sortilège des Chemins (2015)
- L’Innocent (2018)
- Le Déssinateur (2020)
