= Villard Denis =

Haitian poet and painter

Villard Denis (1940–2004), also known as Davertige, was a Haitian poet and painter. Born in Port-au-Prince, Denis grew up in Haiti but later moved to Paris, France where he lived for several years. Denis' paintings have been exhibited in Mexico, Spain, France, and Canada.
