= Marie-Célie Agnant =

Haitian-born Canadian writer (born 1953)

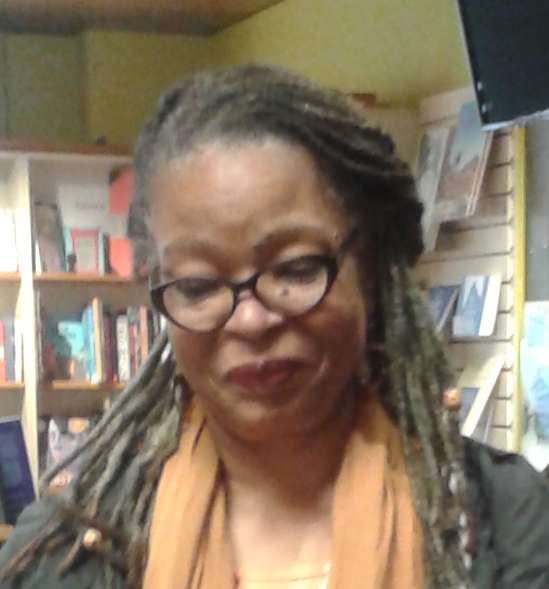
- Agnant at the Olivieri Bookstore in Canada
- Born: 1953 (age 72–73); Port-au-Prince, Haiti
- Occupation: Author
- Known for: Canadian Parliamentary Poet Laureate

Marie-Célie Agnant (born in Port-au-Prince, Haiti in 1953) is an author who has been living in Quebec, Canada, since 1970. In 2023, she was appointed the tenth Canadian Parliamentary Poet Laureate.

Agnant is a writer of poems, novels and novellas, and she has also published children's books. She is also a storyteller and occasionally appears with the Bread & Puppet Theater of Vermont. Her works have been translated into Spanish, English, Dutch, Italian, Catalan and Korean. Her books include Silence Like Blood (Le Silence comme le sang, 1997), which was nominated for the 1998 Governor General's Award, and La Dot de Sara.

== Works ==
=== Novels ===
- La Dot de Sara (in French). Montréal: Remue-ménage. 1995. ISBN 9782890911765.
- Le Livre d'Emma (in French). Montréal: Remue-ménage. 2001. ISBN 9782890911864.
- Un alligator nommé Rosa (in French). Montréal: Remue-ménage. 2006. ISBN 9782890912410.
- Femmes au temps des carnassiers (in French). Montréal: Remue-ménage. 2015. ISBN 9782890915091.

=== News nonfiction ===
- Le Silence comme le sang (in French). Montréal: Remue-ménage. 1997. ISBN 9782890911567.
- Nouvelles d'Ici, d'Ailleurs et de Là-bas (in French). Montréal: Éditions de la Pleine Lune. 2017. ISBN 9782890244832.

=== Poetry ===
- Balafres, Centre international de documentation et d'information haïtienne, caribéenne et afro-canadienne (CIDIHCA), 1994. ISBN 9782920862821
- Et puis parfois quelquefois... (in French). Montréal: Mémoire d'encrier. 2009. ISBN 9782923713151.
- Femmes des terres brûlées (in French). Montréal: Éditions de la Pleine Lune. 2016. ISBN 9782890244504.

=== Children's literature ===
- Alexis d'Haïti, Montreal, Hurtubise, 1999; reprint, Hurtubise HMH, “Atout” collection no . ^{30} , 2006. (ISBN 9782894288979)
- Maïté’s Christmas, Montreal, Hurtubise, 1999. (ISBN 9782894283707)
- Alexis, son of Raphaël, Montreal, Hurtubise, 2000; reprint, Hurtubise HMH, "Atout” collection no . ^{47} , 2006. (ISBN 9782894289372)
- Twenty Little Steps to Maria, Montreal, Hurtubise, 2001. (ISBN 9782894285398)
- Maria, Maria, Maria, Montreal, Hurtubise, 2001. (ISBN 9782894285398)
- The Magic Orange Tree, Montreal, Les 400 coups, 2003. (ISBN 9782895401384)
- The Legend of the Loving Fish, Montreal, Mémoire d'encrier, 2003. (ISBN 9782923153070)
- The Night of the Armadillo: an Aymara tale from the Peruvian forest, Montreal, Les 400 coups, 2008. (ISBN 9782895403821)
- A little round happiness, Ed. Bouton d'Or Acadie, New Brunswick, 2019

== See also ==
- Canadian literature
- Canadian poetry
- List of Canadian poets
- List of Canadian writers
