= Hélène Ouvrard =

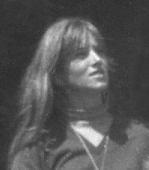
Hélène Ouvrard in 1959

Hélène Ouvrard (November 3, 1938 – January 6, 1999) was a Quebec writer.

== Biography ==
The daughter of Bernadette Boily and Jean de la Salle Ouvrard, she was born in Montreal and was educated at the Collège Marguerite-Bourgeoys, also studying painting at the École des beaux-arts de Montréal and studying piano. From 1968 to 1969, she worked on publicity at the National Film Board of Canada. She was also a freelance writer for the National Film Board and for Radio Canada. She was the main editor for the series of publications Initiation aux métiers d'art du Québec. Ouvrard also contributed to the magazines Châtelaine and La Barre du jour. She was awarded a number of grants from the Canada Council for the Arts and from the Quebec Ministry of Cultural Affairs.

In 1982, she won first prize in the Radio-Canada's Concours d'oeuvres dramatiques radiophoniques. She was awarded the Swiss Prix de la nouvelle in 1983 for L'Ange. Radio Suisse Romande dedicated a week to her radio plays in 1983.

Ouvrard wrote the text for a book published in 1980 based on the film J.A. Martin Photographer. Although mainly known for her novels, she also published poetry, short stories and other prose.

== Selected works ==
- La fleur de peau (1965)
- Le coeur sauvage (1967)
- Le Corps étranger (1973)
- L'herbe et le varech (1977)
- La noyante (1980), shortlisted for the Governor General's Award for French-language fiction in 1980
