= Bobby Theodore =

Bobby Theodore is a Canadian screenwriter, playwright and translator. He has worked mainly in television and theatre, and is most known for his translation of François Archambault's 15 Seconds, for which he was nominated for a Governor General's Award in 2000. In 2016 he is the host of the Glassco Translation Residency in Tadoussac, a retreat that allows playwrights, translators and adaptors from across Canada to develop their projects and exchange ideas with each other. Theodore currently lives in Toronto's annex.

== Early life ==
Theodore was born in Montreal, Quebec, and speaks and writes in both French and English. He graduated with a Bachelor of Arts from Concordia University in 1994. He graduated from the National Theatre School of Canada's playwright program in 1998. He also completed the Bell Media Prime Time TV Program at the Canadian Film Centre in 2005.

== Career ==
Theodore worked as a writer and story editor on a number of Canadian television shows, including Instant Star (2006), Murdoch Mysteries (2008), Cra$h and Burn (2009), and Flashpoint (2010-2011). He also wrote for children's television shows, including the French Canadian animated series, Willa's Wild Life (2008). In addition, Theodore has written for CBC's radio drama, Afghanada, a Canadian's view of the war in Afghanistan.

Theodore spends most of his time working in live theatre, where he has translated over 20 plays from French to English. Theodore participated in the 2013 Playwrights Retreat; he has said that developing friendly relationships with playwrights whose work he translates helps him to understand and connect with their work. As a result, he has a professional relationship with playwright François Archambault, and has translated three of his most well known works: 15 Seconds premiered at the ATP playWrites Festival in Calgary in 1999; The Leisure Society played at the Trafalgar Studios in New York in 2012; and Tarragon Theatre has produced You Will Remember Me in 2016. He has also translated the works of Quebec playwrights Geneviève Billette and Nathalie Boisvert.

Along with Ame Henderson, a Canadian choreographer, Theodore has helped create a theatre performance called 300 Tapes, which premiered at the Theatre Centre in Toronto and at ATP in Calgary. The piece consists of a collection of 100 memories recorded on 100 mini cassette tapes, performed by three actors enlisted by Henderson and Theodore.

=== List of works in theatre ===
Play	Role
Swallow	Co-Writer
Gravity	Writer
Perseus (Olivier Ducas, Francis Monty, Mathieu Gosselin)	Co-Translator
The Sheep and The Whale (Ahmed Ghazali)	Translator
The Leisure Society (François Archambault)	Translator
15 Seconds (François Archambault)	Translator
Luna (Hélène Ducharme)	Translator
Pinocchio (Hugo Bélanger)	Translator
Ubu On The Table (Olivier Ducas, Francis Monty)	Translator
You Will Remember Me (François Archambault)	Translator
Lenny Nil Nil (Francis Monty)	Translator
Offices (Alexis Martin)	Translator
Dear Fizzy (Simon Boudreault)	Translator
The Men Of Good Will (Jean-François Caron)	Translator
Martian Summer (Nathalie Boisvert)	Translator
Crime Against Humanity (Geneviève Billette)	Translator
A (Eric Durnez)	Translator
Trains (Olivier Choinière)	Translator
Cyrano De Bergerac (Edmond Rostand)	Translator

== Recognition ==
Award	Work	Year	Result
Governor General's Award for Literary Translation	French to English translation of 15 Seconds - François Archambault	2000	Nominated/Finalist
Betty Mitchell Award	Outstanding New Play for You Will Remember Me - François Archambault (translation by Bobby Theodore)	2014	Won

== Upcoming projects and projects in process ==
Theodore continues to translate, and is starting a lot more writing projects. He is in the process of creating and writing some drama and comedy series, including The Golden Hour, Super Friends, and Shylock. He is also currently working on developing an English version of the French language humour website, Têtes à claques, which receives over one million hits per day. In March, his most recent translation of The Just, by Albert Camus, had its world premier at Soulpepper, a theatre company based in Toronto, Ontario.
