= Sylvain Trudel =

French-Canadian writer (born 1963)

Sylvain Trudel (born 1963, Montreal) is a French-Canadian writer. His debut novel Le Souffle de l'harmattan appeared in 1986 and he has since published around half a dozen more works of adult fiction. His novel La Mer de la tranquillité won the 2007 Governor General's Prize. He is also a noted author of children's books, of which he has published more than a dozen.

== Selected works ==
- La Mer de la tranquillité
- Du mercure sous la langue
- Le Souffle de l'harmattan
- Terre du roi Christian
- Zara ou la Mer noire
- Les Prophètes

== Prizes ==
- 1987 - Prix Molson du roman, Le Souffle de l'harmattan
- 1988 - Prix Canada-Suisse, Le Souffle de l'harmattan
- 1994 - Prix Edgar-Lespérance, Les Prophètes
- 2002 - Prix littéraire intercollégial, Du mercure sous la langue
- 2002 - Prix des libraires du Québec, Du mercure sous la langue
- 2002 - Prix Christie, Pourquoi le monde est comme il est?
- 2004 - Prix Saint Exupéry, catégorie francophonie à Paris, for his entire oeuvre
- 2007 - Prix du Gouverneur général du Canada, La mer de la tranquillité
