= Gilles Archambault =

Canadian writer

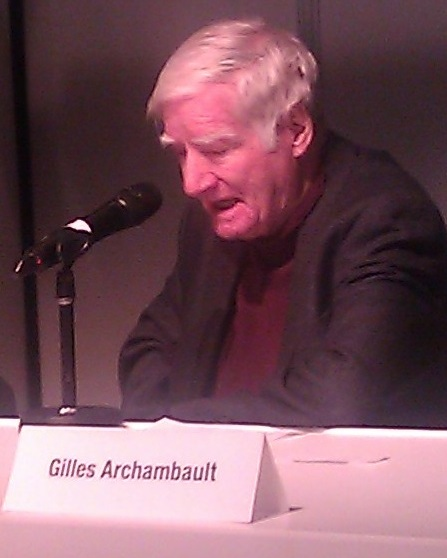
Gilles Archambault during a presentation in 2016

Gilles Archambault (born September 19, 1933 in Montreal, Quebec) is a francophone novelist from Quebec, Canada.

He studied at the Université de Montréal in 1957, and then worked at Radio-Canada, while working as a journalist. From 1988 to 1997, he broadcast a column on the "CBF Bonjour" program. His work appeared in La Presse, Le Devoir, L'Actualité, and Le Livre d'ici.

He won the Prix Athanase-David in 1981 for his body of work, and a Governor General's Award in 1987 for L'obsédante obèse et autres aggressions, a collection of short prose pieces.

He has also written extensively about jazz. His papers are held at the Library of Canada.

== Novels and short story collections ==
- Une suprême discrétion (1963)
- La vie à trois (1965)
- Le tendre matin (1969)
- Parlons de moi (1970)
- La fleur aux dents (1971)
- Enfances lointaines (1972), stories
- La fuite immobile (1974)
- Les Pins parasols (1976)
- Stupeurs et autres écrits (1979), stories
- Le voyageur distrait (1981)
- À voix basse (1983)
- L'obsédante obèse et autres aggressions (1987) (winner of the 1987 Governor General's Award for fiction)
- Les choses d'un jour (1991)
- Un après-midi de septembre (1993)
- Un homme plein d'enfance (1996)
- Les Maladresses du cœur (1998)
- Courir à sa perte (2000)
- De si douce dérives (2003), stories
- De l'autre côté du pont (2004)
- Les Rives prochaines (2007)
- Nous étions jeunes encore (2009)
- Qui de nous deux?, Montréal, Boréal (2011)
- Lorsque le cœur est sombre, Montréal, Boréal (2013)
- Doux Dément, Montréal, Boréal (2015)
- Il se fait tard, Montréal, Boréal (2021)

=== Anthologies ===
- Le Pere, Le Fils. L'AGE D'HOMME. 1991. ISBN 978-2-8251-0198-8.

=== Autobiographical works ===
- Un après-midi de septembre (concerning his mother's disappearance)
- Qui de nous deux? (2011)
