= Marco Micone =

Italian-Canadian playwright and journalist

Marco Micone (born March 23, 1945) is an Italian-Canadian playwright and journalist. He was born in Montelongo, Italy and emigrated to Montreal in 1958.

== Biography ==
Marco Micone grew up in Montreal and since he was thirteen when he arrived he spoke, read and wrote in Italian. In high school, he read Gabrielle Roy's novel, Petite poule d'eau and discovered Quebec literature. He earned French degrees from Loyola College and McGill University where he wrote an M.A. thesis (1971) on the theatre of Marcel Dubé. He spent his professional career teaching Italian at Vanier College in Montreal, but was also involved in community and political activities as a spokesperson for immigrant issues. In the 1970s he joined the Parti Québécois, the nationalist movement in Quebec.

== Work in Theatre and Literature ==
Micone wrote and staged his first French play, Gens du silence in 1980 and became a voice for the voiceless Italian immigrants of Quebec. It was published in 1982 and the English translation, Voiceless People in 1984. The English version was staged in Vancouver in 1986. The first French-language play to critically examine the immigrant conditions in Quebec it went on to achieve great success with repeated productions. Micone's dialectical style took a feminist turn with Addolorata staged in 1983 published in 1984, a play that focuses on the condition of immigrant women. The third play in Micone's trilogy, Déjà l'agonie staged 1986, published 1988, has a pessimistic tone as it considers the lost culture of the immigrant and the abandoned villages in Italy. He published a one-act play, Babele in 1989. Micone published a controversial poem, Speak What 1989 in response to Michèle Lalonde's poem, Speak White. Micone also published a book of biographical essays, Le Figuier enchanté(1992).

Marco Micone worked as a French translator for theatres in Quebec and adapted a number of classical Italian plays for Montreal audiences among which are Pirandello's Sei personaggi in cerca d'autore(1992), Goldoni's La Locandiera (1993), La Serva amorosa (1997), Le donne di buon umore(2000), La vedova scaltra (2002), and Gozzi's Angelino belverde (1998). His translation of Shakespeare's The Taming of the Shrew produced in 1995 was given a feminist adaptation. Micone also published many magazine articles which engage in the controversies of Quebec politics and the conditions of immigrants in a nationalist society.

== Bibliography for Marco Micone ==
- Gens du silence. Montreal: Amérique 1982
  - Voiceless People. Montreal: Guernica, 1984
- Addolorata. Montreal: Guernica, 1984
  - Two Plays: Voiceless People, Addolorata. Montreal: Guernica, 1988
- Déjà l'agonie. Montreal: l'Hexagone, 1988
  - Beyond the Ruins. Toronto: Guernica, 1995
- Le Figuier enchanté. Montreal: Boréal, 1992
  - La Locandiera. transl. of Goldoni. Montreal: Boréal, 1993
- Speak what: suivi d'une analyse de Lise Gauvin. Montreal: VLB Editeur, 2001
- Silences. Montreal: VLB, 2004
- Migrances, suivi de Una Donna. Montreal: VLB, 2005

== Awards ==
- Grand Prix du Journal de Montreal for Déjà l'agonie. 1989
- Prix des Arcades de Bologne for Le Figuier enchanté. 1992
