= Julie Keith =

American-Canadian writer

- Born: Chicago, Illinois, U.S.
- Education: Smith College (BA); Concordia University (MA)
- Occupation: Writer
- Spouse: Dick Pound
- Children: 2
- Writing career
- Period: 1990s–present
- Notable works: The Jaguar Temple, The Devil Out There

Julie Houghton Keith is an American-Canadian writer, best known for her short-story collections The Jaguar Temple and The Devil Out There.

== Background ==
She was born and brought up near Chicago, and was educated at Smith College in Northampton, Massachusetts. She received a B.A. from Smith College in 1962 and an M.A. from Concordia University in 1989. She is married to lawyer Dick Pound, a former vice-president of the International Olympic Committee.

== Writing ==
Her first collection of short stories, The Jaguar Temple (Nuage Editions, 1995), was shortlisted for the Governor General's Award for English-language fiction at the 1995 Governor General's Awards. Her second collection, The Devil Out There (Knopf Canada, 1999), won the Quebec Writers' Federation's award for fiction in 2000.

Keith also won the Quebec Writers' Federation Community Award in 2006.
