= Suzanne Paradis =

Canadian poet, novelist and critic

Suzanne Paradis (born 27 October 1932) is a Canadian poet, novelist and critic based in Quebec. Paradis was born in Quebec City, Quebec.

== Books ==
- Pour les enfants des morts
- A temps, le bonheur
- Les Hauts Cris
- La Chasse aux autres
- Les Cormorans
- L'Oeuvre de pierre
- Pour voir les plectrophanes naitre
- Emmanuelle en noir
- Il y eut un matin
- La Voie sauvage
- Quand la terre etait toujours jeune
- L'ete sera chaud
- Noir sur sang
- Un Portrait de Jeanne Joron
- Poemes, 1959, 1960, 1961
- Adrienne Choquette lue par Suzanne Paradis
- Miss Charlie
- Les Chevaux de verre
- Un gout de sel
- Un Aigle dans la basse-cour
- La Ligne bleue

== Sources ==
- Dictionary of Literary Biography, Volume 53: Canadian Writers Since 1960, Page 318
- Suzanne Paradis entry in The Canadian Encyclopedia
- Suzanne Paradis entry in the Dictionary of Literary Biography
- Suzanne Paradis entry in L'île, L'infocentre littéraire des écrivains québécois site
- William H. New (2002). Encyclopedia of literature in Canada. University of Toronto Press. pp. 863–64. ISBN 978-0-8020-0761-2.
