= Aki Shimazaki =

Canadian novelist and translator

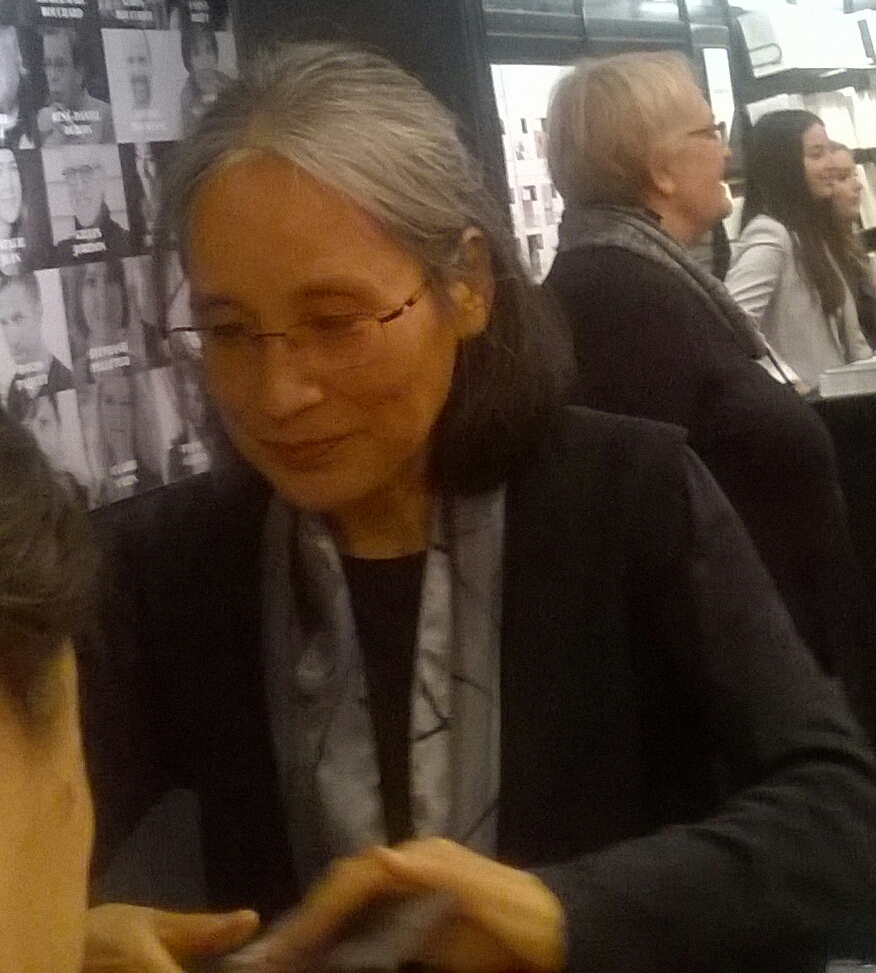
Aki Shimazaki

Aki Shimazaki (born 1954 in Gifu, Japan) is a Canadian novelist and translator. She moved to Canada in 1981, living in Vancouver and Toronto. Since 1991 she has lived in Montreal, where she teaches Japanese and publishes her novels in French.

Her second novel, Hamaguri, won the Prix Ringuet in 2000. Her fourth, Wasurenagusa, won the Canada-Japan Literary Prize in 2002. Her fifth, Hotaru, won the 2005 Governor General's Award for French fiction. Her books have been translated in English, Japanese, German, Hungarian, Italian and Russian.

== Novels ==
Pentalogy "Le poids des secrets" :

- Tsubaki, 1999
- Hamaguri, 2000
- Tsubame, 2001
- Wasurenagusa, 2002
- Hotaru, 2005

Pentalogy "Au coeur du Yamato" :

- Mitsuba, 2006
- Zakuro, 2008
- Tonbo, 2010
- Tsukushi, 2012
- Yamabuki, 2013

Pentalogy "L'ombre du chardon" :

- Azami, 2014
- Hôzuki, 2015
- Suisen, 2016
- Fuki-no-tô, 2017
- Maïmaï, 2018

Pentalogy "Une clochette sans battant" :

- Suzuran, 2019
- Sémi, 2021
- No-no-yuri, 2022
- Niré, 2023
- Urushi, 2024

In progress :

- Ajisaï, 2025
