= Lise Vaillancourt =

Canadian writer

Lise Vaillancourt (born July 5, 1954) is a Quebec writer.

She was born in Montreal and studied philosophy at the Cégep Édouard-Montpetit and theatre and film at the Université du Québec à Montréal and the Université Laval. From 1975 to 1979, she apprenticed as a mime at the Théâtre national du Mime du Québec. From 1982 to 1987, she was an artistic director for the Théâtre expérimental des femmes and a co-founder of Théâtre Espace Go. In 1991, Vaillancourt became artistic director for the Théâtre de la Ville de Longueui. She also wrote for the publications Le Devoir, Jeu and Trois. She has been artist-in-residence at the Art Studio at the Banff Centre, at the Festival des francophonies en Limousin and at the Chartreuse de Villeneuve-lès-Avignon. She has served as president of the Centre des auteurs dramatiques du Québec.

== Selected works ==
=== Plays for young people ===
- Ballade pour trois baleines (1982)
- Martha Jenkins (1982)
- Si toi aussi tu m'abandonnes... (1986)
- Marie-Antoine, Opus 1 (1984), English translation included in Anthology of Québec Plays in English Translation Vol I (1966-1986)
- Amours imprévues dans la jungle équatoriale (1986)
- Billy Strauss (1990)
- Le Petit Dragon (1996), shortlisted for a Governor General's Award in 2000

=== Novels ===
- Journal d'une obsédée (1989)
- L'Été des eiders (1996), finalist for the Governor General's Award for French-language fiction
