= David Gurr =

Canadian writer

David Hugh Courtney Gurr (born 1936) is a Canadian writer and author of literary novels and political thrillers. He was born William Le Breton Harvey Brisbane-Bedwell in London, England, but his name was changed by adoption in 1941. He was educated at Sherborne Prep and University College in England before emigrating with his family to Canada. He attended Belmont High School in Victoria, British Columbia, the Royal Canadian Naval College, and the University of Victoria. Gurr served with the Royal Canadian Navy from 1954 to 1970 as an executive officer and computer systems analyst. His first interest was in the theatre, and he received a scholarship to "tread the boards" at UBC in the summer of 1952. His name can still be seen painted on the backstage wall of the Old Auditorium.

From 1971 to 1980, he designed and built homes on Vancouver Island.

He has been a writer since 1976. His works include: Troika (1979), A Woman Called Scylla (1981), The Action of the Tiger (1984), An American Spy Story (1984), On the Endangered List (1985), The Ring Master (1987) plus various thrillers under pseudonyms; two stage plays: Leonora (1984) and The Ring Play: An Evening with Hitler (1991); and he was co-author for two screen plays (with George Cosmatos).

Troika was short-listed for the John Creasey Memorial Award. The Ring Master was nominated for the Governor General's Award. The Voice of the Crane was short-listed for the Commonwealth Prize (Canadian-Caribbean Division).

He currently resides in Victoria, British Columbia, Canada.

== Bibliography ==
- The Canadian Who's Who, Elizabeth Lumley
- The Canadian Encyclopedia, "Popular Literature in English: Mysteries"
- Interview with the author by Raymond H. Thompson on The Ring Master. 27 July 1989.
- Gale CENGAGE sources: Contemporary Authors, volume(s) 132, Contemporary Authors - Brief Entry, volume(s) 125, Contemporary Authors New Revision Series, volume(s) 105, Interview in volume(s) CA-132
