= Louise Simard (writer) =

Canadian writer (born 1950)

Louise Simard (born 1950) is a Quebec writer.

She was born in Montreal and grew up in Mont-Laurier, Quebec. As of 2010, she was living in Stoke in the Eastern Townships.

Simard earned a master's degree and Doctorate in French studies from the Université de Sherbrooke.

In 1992, her book La très noble demoiselle was nominated for the Governor General's Award for French-language fiction. She was awarded the Prix Alfred-Desrochers in 1995 for the novel Laure Conan, la romancière aux rubans, the Prix Jean-Hamelin in 1996 for Le médaillon dérobé and the Grand Prix littéraire Archambault in 2001 for her novel Thana, La fille-rivière.

== Published books ==
- La très noble demoiselle, 1992 ISBN 9782923662152
- Laure Conan: La Romanciere aux Rubans, 1995 ISBN 9782892611175
- La Route de Parramatta, 1998 ISBN 9782764803813
- Thana: La fille-rivière, 2000 ISBN 9782764800461
- Thana, 2002 ISBN 9782891119689
- Thana: Les vents de Grand'Anse, 2004 ISBN 9782764801307
- La Promesse, 2004 ISBN 9782764801222
- Où sont allés les engoulevents ?, 2005 ISBN 9782764802175
- Comme plume au vent, 2007 ISBN 9782764803776
- La Chanson de l'autour, 2008 ISBN 9782895684244
- Kila et le gerfaut blessé, 2008 ISBN 9782895683711
- Le retour du pygargue, 2009 ISBN 9782895684589
- Éliza et le petit duc, 2009 ISBN 9782895684596
- La Communiante, 2010 ISBN 9782764804810
