= Nicole Houde =

Canadian writer (1945-2016)

Nicole Houde (November 1, 1945 – February 2, 2016) was a Quebec writer.

The daughter of Thérèse Simard and Roland Houde, she was born in Saint-Fulgence and studied education at the École normale Bon-Pasteur and anthropology at the Université de Montréal. Her short stories have been published in various periodicals including Moebius, Arcade and Un Lac, un Fjord. Her first novel La malentendue, published in 1983, received the Prix des Jeunes Écrivains of the Journal de Montréal.

== Selected works ==
- La Maison du remous (1986), received the Prix Hervé-Foulon in 2013
- L'Enfant de la batture (1989), received the Prix Air Canada and was a finalist for the Molson Prize
- Lettres à cher Alain (1990)
- Les Inconnus du jardin, novel (1991), was a finalist for the Molson Prize
- Les Oiseaux de Saint-John Perse (1994), received the Governor General's Award for French-language fiction
- La chanson de Violetta (1998)
- Je pense à toi (2008)

Source for works:
