= Hélène Rioux =

Canadian writer and translator (born 1949)

- Born: January 12, 1949 (age 77); Montreal, Quebec, Canada
- Education: Université de Montréal
- Occupations: Novelist, translator
- Writing career
- Notable awards: Prix France-Québec 2007 Mercredi soir au Bout du monde; Prix Ringuet 2008 Mercredi soir au Bout du monde

Hélène Rioux (born January 12, 1949) is a French Canadian writer and translator.

She was born in Montreal, Quebec and was educated at the Cégep du Vieux-Montréal, going on to study Russian at the Université de Montréal. Her stories have been published in various periodicals such as XYZ, Moebius, Arcade and Possibles. Rioux has also written a literary column for the Journal d'Outremont.

She has translated works by a number of Canadian authors into French, including works by Linda Leith, Julie Keith, Wayson Choy, Madeleine Thien, Taras Grescoe, Bernice Morgan and Lucy Maud Montgomery. Rioux received a Quebec Writers' Federation Award for her translation of Self by Yann Martel. She was also a finalist for the same award for her translation of The Memory Artists by Jeffrey Moore (Les artistes de la Mémoire). Her novels have been translated into English, Spanish and Bulgarian.

== Selected works ==
- Les Miroirs d'Éléonore, novel (1990), finalist for the Governor General's Award for French-language fiction and for the Grand Prix littéraire from the Journal de Montréal
- Chambre avec baignoire, novel (1992), won the Grand Prix littéraire from the Journal de Montréal and the Prix de la Société des écrivains canadiens
- Pense à mon rendez-vous (1994)
- Mercredi soir au bout du monde, novel (2007), received the Prix littéraire France-Québec and the Prix Ringuet
