= Jacques Folch-Ribas =

Canadian novelist and art critic

- Born: November 4, 1928 (age 97); Barcelona, Spain
- Occupations: novelist, art critic
- Writing career
- Period: 1970s-present
- Notable works: Une aurore boréale, Le silence, ou Le parfait bonheur
- Notable awards: Prix Québec-Paris (1974); Prix Molson (1983); Governor General's Award for French-language fiction (1988)

Jacques Folch-Ribas (born November 4, 1928, in Barcelona, Spain) is a Canadian novelist and art critic from Quebec.

Born in Barcelona, Spain to Catalan parents, he grew up in France after his parents fled Francoist Spain in 1939. He studied mathematics, philosophy, urban planning and architecture at university, and worked for Le Corbusier, before moving to Montreal, where he became a Canadian citizen in 1961. In Montreal, he was a longtime art and literary critic for La Presse alongside his work as a novelist.

He won the Prix Québec-Paris in 1974 for Une aurore boréale, the Prix Molson in 1983 for Le Valet de plume, and the Governor General's Award for French-language fiction in 1988 for Le silence, ou Le parfait bonheur. He is a member of the Académie des lettres du Québec.

== Works ==
- La horde des Zamé (Le démolisseur) (1970)
- Le greffon (1971)
- Une aurore boréale (1974)
- Le Valet de plume (1983)
- La chair de pierre (1984)
- Dehors, les chiens (1986)
- Première nocturne (1991)
- Marie Blanc (1993)
- Homme de plaisir (1999)
- Le silence, ou Le parfait bonheur (1999)
- Des années, des mois, des jours (2001)
- Les pélicans de Géorgie (2009)
- Paco (2011)
