= Pierre Samson =

Canadian writer (born 1958)

Pierre Samson (born 1958) is a Canadian writer. He was born in Montreal, Quebec and settled in Toronto, Ontario in 1995 where he wrote his first novel Messie de Belém. He returned to Montreal and published a second novel entitled Un garçon de compagnie (A boy of Company). All his novels have been published by Editions Les Herbes Rouges.

With Richard Blaimert, he is the screenwriter of the Radio-Canada television show Cover Girl (2005). He is a regular contributor to Montreal newspaper Le Devoir.

== Works ==
- Messie de Belém, 1995, novel
- Un garçon de compagnie, Les Herbes rouges, 1997, novel
- Il était une fois une ville, Les Herbes rouges, 1999 novel
- Alibi, Leméac, 2001, essay
- Catastrophes, Les Herbes rouges, 2007, novel
- Arabaseques, Les Herbes rouges, 2010, novel
- Lettres crues : Théâtre épistolaire de la littérature à l'époque des médias sociaux, L'Ouvroir, 2012, letters
- La maison des pluies, Les Herbes rouges, 2012, novel
- L'œil de cuivre, Les Herbes rouges, 2014, novel

== Honours ==
- 1998 – Governor General's Awards, finalist for Un garçon de compagnie
- 2000 – Governor General's Awards, finalist for Il était une fois une ville
- 2001 – The academy's prize for Il était une fois une ville
- 2008 – Prix littéraire des collégiens (College Literary Award) for Catastrophes
- 2013 – Grand Prix du livre de Montréal (Montreal Grand Prize for books) for La maison des pluies
