= Noel Mostert =

South African historian and author

Noël Mostert was a South African historian and author of several books, including the best seller Supership which examined the oil shipping trade prior to 1974 when it was published. Among a variety of topics covered, Supership includes critique of mechanical problems associated with VLCC (very large crude carriers) and discussion of the impact of oil pollution at sea. Mostert's later works include Frontiers: The Epic of South Africa's Creation and the Tragedy of the Xhosa People (1992) and The Line upon a Wind: The Greatest War Fought at Sea Under Sail, 1793–1815 (2007).
