= Annouchka Gravel Galouchko =

Canadian visual artist and illustrator

Annouchka Gravel Galouchko (born July 28, 1960) is a Canadian visual artist and award-winning illustrator of children's books.

She was born in Montreal and travelled with her family to Iran, Egypt, Mexico and Austria. She received a BFA from the Université du Québec à Montréal. She works as an artist in mixed media.

Her first published book was The Nutmeg Princess (1992) with text by Richardo Keens-Douglas.

Her partner Stéphan Daigle is also an artist.

== Selected work ==
- Sho et les dragons d'eau (1995) text by Annouchka Gravel Galouchko, translated into English as Sho and the Demons of the Deep by Stephen Daigle, won the Governor General's Award for French-language children's illustration and was also nominated for the Governor General's Award for French-language children's writing, the English version received a Forest of Reading Silver Birth Award
- The Birdman (2006) text by Veronika Martenova Charles, illustrated by Annouchka Gravel Galouchko and Stephen Daigle, nominated for the Governor General's Award for English-language children's illustration
