= Esther Croft =

Esther Croft (born 1945) is a Quebec educator and writer.

She was born in Quebec City and was educated at the Université Laval. She studied with Élisabeth Bing in Paris on how to lead writing workshops. On her return, she taught theatre and creative writing at the Université Laval. Croft has led writing workshops for people from various professions; she also established Les Ateliers d'écriture Esther Croft. She has written for various periodicals such as Châtelaine, La revue de la nouvelle, Arcade, XYZ, Le Devoir and La parole métèque.

== Selected works ==
- Au commencement était le froid, stories (1993), received the Prix Desjardins from the Salon du livre de Québec in 1994 and was also a finalist for the Prix de l'Institut canadien de Québec, the Governor General's Award for French-language fiction and the Signet d'or from Radio-Québec
- Tu ne mourras pas, stories (1997)
- De belles paroles, novel (2002)
- Le reste du temps, stories (2007), received the Prix de création littéraire for adult literature from Quebec City and the Prix Adrienne-Choquette, and was included on the short list for the Governor General's Literary Awards
- Les rendez-vous manqués, stories (2011), received the Prix littéraires des enseignants AQPF-ANEL in 2011
