= Louis Hamelin =

Canadian journalist and fiction writer (born 1959)

- Born: June 9, 1959 (age 67); Saint-Séverin-de-Proulxville, Quebec
- Occupation: Writer
- Writing career
- Period: 1980s-present
- Notable works: La Rage, Sauvages, La Constellation du Lynx

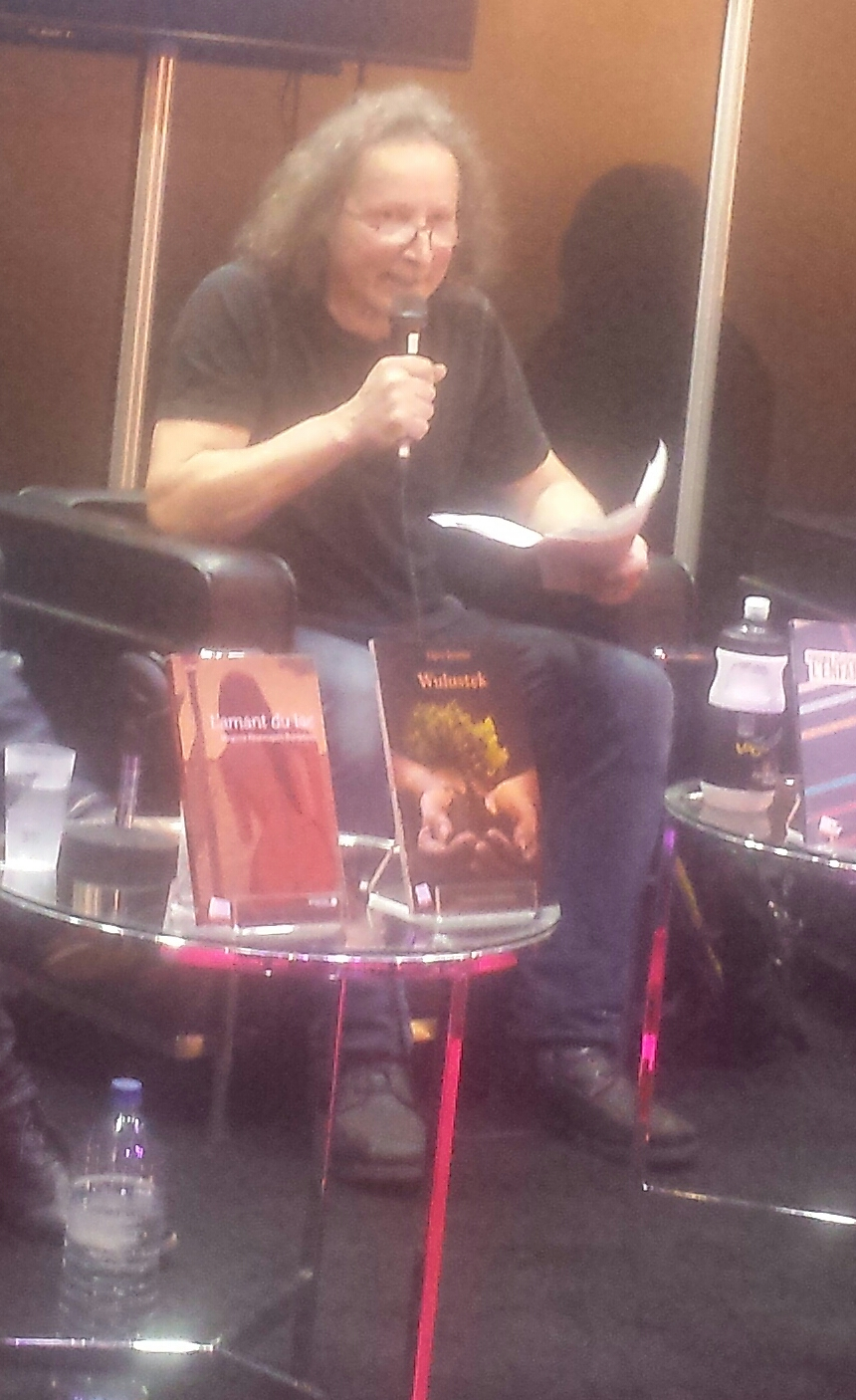
Louis Hamelin photographed photographed in Montréal, Québec, Canada at the Salon du livre de Montréal 2018.

Louis Hamelin (born June 9, 1959 in Saint-Séverin-de-Proulxville, Quebec) is a Canadian journalist and fiction writer. He won the Governor General's Award for French-language fiction in 1989 for his novel La Rage, and was nominated for the same award in 1995 for his novel Betsi Larousse, ou l'ineffable eccéité de la loutre and in 2006 for his short story collection Sauvages.

Having graduated from McGill University and the Université du Québec à Montréal, he has also worked as a journalist and literary critic for Le Devoir.

His 2010 novel La Constellation du Lynx, a fictionalized account of the 1970 October Crisis, won numerous literary awards in Quebec, including the Prix littéraire des collégiens, the Prix des libraires du Québec, the Grand Prix littéraire de la Presse québécoise and the Prix Ringuet. An English translation by Wayne Grady, titled October 1970, was published in 2013 and was named a longlisted nominee for that year's Scotiabank Giller Prize.

== Works ==
=== Fiction ===
- La Rage (1989)
- Ces spectres agités (1991)
- Cowboy, 1992 (translated by Jean-Paul Murray as Cowboy, 2000)
- Betsi Larousse, ou l'ineffable eccéité de la loutre, 1994 (translated by Jean-Paul Murray as Betsi Larousse or the Ineffable Essence of the Otter, published by Ekstasis in 2015).
- Le Soleil des gouffres (1996)
- Le Joueur de flûte (2001)
- Sauvages (2006)
- La Constellation du Lynx, 2010 (translated by Wayne Grady as October 1970, 2013)
- Autour d'Éva. (2016)
- Les crépuscules de la Yellowstone (2020)
- Un lac le matin (2023)

=== Non-fiction ===
- Les Étranges et édifiantes aventures d'un oniromane, 1994
- Le Voyage en pot, 1999
- Les Héritiers de Don Quichotte, 2024
