= Marie José Thériault =

Canadian writer, performer and translator (born 1945)

- Born: March 21, 1945 (age 81); Montreal
- Occupations: Writer, performer and translator

Marie José Thériault (born March 21, 1945) is a Quebec writer, performer and translator.

== Early years ==
The daughter of Yves Thériault and Michelle (Germaine) Blanchet, she was born in Montreal. She had an interest in learning other languages from a young age, learning to speak Italian at the age of eight. She also studied ballet with Madame Ludmilla Chiriaeff. During stays in Europe with her family, she pursued further studies of languages and various forms of dance. In 1963, she began a career as a flamenco dancer. In 1968, she also began singing professionally, going on to perform on radio and television and also producing a number of recordings.

== Writing career ==
During the 1970s, Thériault began contributing to publications such as Lettres québécoises and Le Devoir. She worked as an editor for various magazines including XYZ, Vice & Versa and Liberté. She also worked as a translator and as a literary commentator on radio. In 1987, she founded the publishing house Les Éditions Sans Nom, which mainly produces artist's books.

Her poetry collection Invariance, published in 1980, received the Canada-Switzerland Literary Prize. Her novel Les Demoiselles de Numidie (1984) was shortlisted for the Governor General's Award for French-language fiction. In 1993, she received the Governor General's Award for English to French translation for her translation L'Oeuvre du Gallois (Wales' Work by Robert Walshe) in 1993 and for Arracher les montagnes (Digging the Mountains by Neil Bissoondath) in 1997. In 1996, she received the Prix Les Mots d'or, awarded by the APFA (Action pour promouvoir le français des affaires), for her translation of Clicking by Faith Popcorn.

== Family life ==
She is the sister of Michel Thériault, an internationally renowned authority on canon law.
