= Christiane Frenette =

Canadian educator and writer

Christiane Frenette (born November 18, 1954) is a Quebec educator and writer.

The daughter of Pierrette Duchesne and Claude Frenette, she was born in Quebec City and received a master's degree in Quebec literature from the Université Laval. Frenette taught literature at the Cégep de Lévis-Lauzon.

Her collection of poetry Indigo nuit received the Prix Octave-Crémazie in 1986. She was awarded the Governor General's Award for French-language fiction for La Terre ferme in 1998; that novel was translated into English as Terra Firma by Sheila Fischman in 1999.

== Selected works ==
- Cérémonie mémoire, poetry (1988), finalist for the Governor General's Award for French-language poetry
- Le ciel s'arrête quelque part, poetry (1991)
- Après la nuit rouge (2006), finalist for a Governor General's Literary Award; translated into English by Sheila Fischman as After the Red Night and was nominated for a ReLit Award
