= André Brochu =

André Brochu (born 3 March 1942 in Saint-Eustache, Quebec) is a poet, essayist and professor of Quebecois literature.

== Life ==
He graduated from the Université de Montréal in 1961, and from Université Paris VIII.

He has been a member of the Académie des Lettres du Québec since September 1996.

== Works ==
=== Poetry ===
- Privilèges de l'ombre, L'Hexagone, 1961
- Les Matins nus, le vent, Éditions Trois, 1989
- Particulièrement la vie change, L'Hexagone, 1990
- Dans les chances de l'air. Montréal, (Québec), Canada: Éditions de L'Hexagone. 1990. pp. 171. ISBN 978-2890065215.
- Delà (2005 ed.). Montréal, (Québec), Canada: Éditions de L'Hexagone. 1993. pp. 171. ISBN 978-2890065215.
- Tableau du poème. Montréal, (Québec), Canada: Éditions XYZ. 1994. pp. 240. ISBN 978-2-89261-115-1.
- L'Inconcevable, Éditions Trois, 1998
- Je t'aime, je t'écris, Québec-Amérique, 2001
- Les Jours à vif. Vol. Opale. Laval, (Québec), Canada: Éditions Trois. 2004. pp. 109. ISBN 978-2-89516-063-2.
- Élégies de lumière, Éditions Trois, 2005
- Cahiers d'Icare. Montréal, (Québec), Canada: Éditions Triptyque. 2009. p. 160. ISBN 978-2-89031-668-3.

=== Novels ===
- Adéodat I, Éditions du Jour, 1973
- La Croix du Nord (2005 ed.). Montréal, (Québec), Canada: Les Éditions XYZ. 1991. pp. 153. ISBN 978-2-89006-363-1.
- La Vie aux trousses (2005 ed.). Montréal, (Québec), Canada: Les Éditions XYZ. 1993. pp. 249. ISBN 978-2-89261-073-4.
- Fièvres blanches, Les Éditions XYZ, 1994
- Les Épervières, Les Éditions XYZ, 1996
- Adèle intime, Les Éditions XYZ, 1996
- Le Maître rêveur, Les Éditions XYZ, 1997

=== Essays and literary studies ===
- Délit contre délit, Les Presses de l'A.G.E.U.M., 1965
- Hugo : amour, crime, révolution essai sur Les Misérables, Presses de l'Université de Montréal, 1974; réédition, Nota Bene, 1999
- L'Évasion tragique : essai sur les romans d'André Langevin, HMH Hurtubuse, 1985
- "Essais autobiographiques et littéraires". La Visée critique. Montréal, (Québec), Canada: Éditions du Boréal. 1988. pp. 249. ISBN 978-2-89052-229-9.
- Le Singulier pluriel, L'Hexagone, 1992
- La Grande Langue : éloge de l'anglais, Les Éditions XYZ, 1993
- L'Institut Rossell (1934-1994), Les Éditions XYZ, 1994
- Roman et énumération de Flaubert à Perec, Département d'études françaises de l'Université de Montréal, 1996
- Une étude de Bonheur d'occasion, Boréal, 1998
- Saint-Denys Garneau, le poète, Les Éditions XYZ, 1999
- Anne Hébert : le secret de vie et de mort, Presses de l'Université d'Ottawa, 2000

== Honors ==
- 1988 – Prix Gabrielle-Roy, La Visée critique
- 1990 – 2e prix du Concours de nouvelles de Radio-Canada, L'Esprit ailleurs
- 1990 – Prix du Gouverneur général, Dans les chances de l'air
- 1991 – Prix du Gouverneur général, La Croix du Nord
- 1993 – Prix littéraires du Journal de Montréal, La Vie aux trousses
- 1995 – Grand Prix du Festival international de la poésie, Delà
- 1996 – Membre de l'Académie des lettres du Québec
- 2004 – Prix du Gouverneur général, Les Jours à vif
