= Hélène Vachon =

Canadian writer living in Quebec (born 1947)

Hélène Vachon (born 1947) is a Canadian writer living in Quebec.

She was born in Quebec City, and studied modern French literature at the Université de Paris X and textual criticism at Laval University. She then worked for the Quebec Ministry of Culture and Communications. Vachon lives on the Île d'Orléans.

== Selected works ==
Sources:

- Le sixième arrêt, children's literature (1995), received the Prix Alvine-Bélisle
- Le plus proche voisin (1998), received the Prix littéraire Desjardins
- Le délire de Somerset, children's literature (1999), shortlisted for a Governor General's Award
- Le Piège de l’ombre, children's literature (2000)
- L’oiseau de passage, children's literature (2001), received the Governor General's Award for French-language children's literature and a Mr. Christie's Book Award
- La tête ailleurs, novel (2002), shortlisted for the Governor General's Award for French-language fiction
- Singuliers voyageurs, children's literature (2004)
- L’Arbre tombé, children's literature (2007)
- Mon look d'enfer, children's literature (2008)
- La Manière Barrow, novel (2013)
