= Prix Ringuet =

The Prix Ringuet is a Canadian literary award, presented each year by the Académie des lettres du Québec to an author from Quebec for a book of French-language fiction. First presented in 1983 as the Prix Molson, the award was later renamed for novelist Philippe Panneton, who wrote under the pen name Ringuet and was a founding member of the Académie.

== Prize recipients ==
=== Prix Molson ===
- 1983 - Jacques Folch-Ribas, Le Valet de plume
- 1984 - Madeleine Ouellette-Michalska, La Maison Trestler
- 1985 - Pauline Harvey, Encore une partie pour Berri
- 1986 - Daniel Gagnon, La Fille à marier
- 1987 - Sylvain Trudel, Le Souffle de l'harmattan
- 1988 - Francine D'Amour, Les Dimanches sont mortels
- 1989 - Jean Marcel, Hypathie ou la Fin des dieux
- 1990 - Jacques Poulin, Le Vieux chagrin
- 1991 - Robert Baillie, La Nuit de la Saint-Basile
- 1992 - Paul Bussières, Mais qui va donc consoler Mingo?
- 1993 - Jacques Desautels, Le Quatrième roi mage
- 1994 - Sergio Kokis, Le Pavillon des miroirs

=== Prix Ringuet ===
- 1997 - Louise Dupré, La Memoria
- 1998 - Pierre Ouellet, La légende dorée
- 1999 - Gaétan Soucy, La petite fille qui aimait trop les allumettes
- 2000 - Christiane Duchesne, L'homme des silences
- 2001 - Aki Shimazaki, Hamaguri
- 2002 - Guillaume Vigneault, Chercher le vent
- 2003 - Rober Racine, L'ombre de la terre
- 2004 - Gilles Jobidon, La route des petits matins
- 2005 - Pierre Yergeau, Les amours perdues
- 2006 - Martine Desjardins, L'évocation
- 2007 - Andrée A. Michaud, Mirror Lake
- 2008 - Hélène Rioux, Mercredi Soir au Bout du Monde
- 2009 - Martin Robitaille, Les déliaisons
- 2010 - Alexandre Lazaridès, Adieu, vert paradis
- 2011 - Louis Hamelin, La Constellation du lynx
- 2012 - Jocelyne Saucier, Il pleuvait des oiseaux
- 2013 - Jean Bédard, Marguerite Porète
- 2014 - Yvon Paré, Le voyage d'Ulysse
- 2015 - Michaël La Chance, Épisodies
- 2016 - Gabriel Marcoux-Chabot, Tas-d'roches
- 2017 - Christian Guay-Poliquin, Le Poids de la neige
- 2018 - Stéfanie Clermont, Le jeu de la musique
- 2019 - Kevin Lambert, Querelle de Roberval
- 2020 - Élise Turcotte, L’apparition du chevreuil
- 2021 - Ying Chen, Rayonnements
- 2022 - Alain Farah, Mille secrets mille dangers
- 2023 - Kevin Lambert, Que notre joie demeure
