= Prix littéraire des collégiens =

The Prix littéraire des collégien·ne·s is a Canadian literary award, presented annually to a work of French-language Canadian literature selected by a committee of students from colleges and CEGEPs in Quebec.

Presented for the first time in 2004, the award was created as a merger of the Intercollegial Prize (Prix littéraire intercollégial), created in 2002 by Collège Montmorency, and the Prix des cégépiens, created in 2003 by the Cégep de Sherbrooke.

== Winners and nominees ==
=== Intercollegial Prize ===
| Year | Author | Title | Ref |
|---|---|---|---|
| 2002 | Sylvain Trudel | Du mercure sous la langue | |
| 2002 | Nelly Arcan | Putain | |
| 2002 | Louis Hamelin | Le Joueur de flûte | |
| 2002 | Suzanne Jacob | Rouge, mère et fils | |
| 2002 | Pierre Yergeau | La Désertion | |
| 2003 | Stéphane Bourguignon | Un peu de fatigue | |
| 2003 | Louis Caron | Il n’y a plus d’Amérique | |
| 2003 | Jean-François Chassay | L'Angle mort | |
| 2003 | Lynn Diamond | Le corps de mon frère | |
| 2003 | Jacques Poulin | Les Yeux bleus de Mistassini | |

=== Prix des cégépiens ===
| Year | Author | Title | Ref |
|---|---|---|---|
| 2003 | Jacques Poulin | Les Yeux bleus de Mistassini | |
| 2003 | Neil Bissoondath (tr. Lori Saint-Martin, Paul Gagné) | Un baume pour le coeur | |
| 2003 | France Daigle | Petites difficultés d’existence | |
| 2003 | Michael Delisle | Dée | |
| 2003 | Louis Gauthier | Voyage au Portugal avec un allemand | |
| 2003 | François Gravel | Je ne comprends pas tout | |

=== 2000s ===
| Year | Author | Title | Ref |
|---|---|---|---|
| 2004 | Ook Chung | Contes Butô | |
| 2004 | Yves Gosselin | Discours de réception | |
| 2004 | François Gravel | Adieu, Betty Crocker | |
| 2004 | Lise Tremblay | La Héronnière | |
| 2004 | Michel Tremblay | Le Cahier noir | |
| 2005 | Pan Bouyoucas | Anna pourquoi | |
| 2005 | Nelly Arcan | Folle | |
| 2005 | Francine D'Amour | Le Retour d'Afrique | |
| 2005 | Andrée A. Michaud | Le Pendu de Trempes | |
| 2005 | Michèle Péloquin | Les yeux des autres | |
| 2006 | Nicolas Dickner | Nikolski | |
| 2006 | Michael Delisle | Le sort de fille | |
| 2006 | Christiane Frenette | Après la nuit rouge | |
| 2006 | Suzanne Jacob | Fugueuses | |
| 2006 | Clara Ness | Ainsi font-elles toutes | |
| 2007 | Myriam Beaudoin | Hadassa | |
| 2007 | Mélikah Abdelmoumen | Alia | |
| 2007 | Hervé Bouchard | Parents et amis sont invités à y assister | |
| 2007 | Normand de Bellefeuille | Votre appel est important | |
| 2007 | Jacques Poulin | La traduction est une histoire d'amour | |
| 2008 | Pierre Samson | Catastrophes | |
| 2008 | Robert Lalonde | Espèces en voie de disparition | |
| 2008 | Stéfani Meunier | Ce n'est pas une façon de dire adieu | |
| 2008 | Lise Tremblay | La sœur de Judith | |
| 2008 | Élise Turcotte | Pourquoi faire une maison avec ses morts | |
| 2009 | Catherine Mavrikakis | Le Ciel de Bay City | |
| 2009 | Johanne Alice Côté | Mégot, mégot, petite mitaine | |
| 2009 | Francine Noël | J'ai l'angoisse légère | |
| 2009 | Monique Proulx | Champagne | |
| 2009 | Ying Chen | Un enfant à ma porte | |

=== 2010s ===
| Year | Author | Title | Ref |
|---|---|---|---|
| 2010 | Marc Séguin | La Foi du braconnier | |
| 2010 | Anne Guilbeault | Joies | |
| 2010 | Dany Laferrière | L'Énigme du retour | |
| 2010 | Monique LaRue | L'Œil de Marquise | |
| 2010 | Julie Mazzieri | Discours sur la tombe de l'idiot | |
| 2011 | Louis Hamelin | La Constellation du Lynx | |
| 2011 | Michael Delisle | Tiroir No. 24 | |
| 2011 | Dominique Fortier | Les Larmes de saint Laurent | |
| 2011 | Marie-Pascale Huglo | La Respiration du monde | |
| 2011 | David Leblanc | Mon nom est Personne | |
| 2012 | Jocelyne Saucier | Il pleuvait des oiseaux | |
| 2012 | Samuel Archibald | Arvida | |
| 2012 | Jean-Simon DesRochers | Le Sablier des solitudes | |
| 2012 | Catherine Mavrikakis | Les Derniers Jours de Smokey Nelson | |
| 2012 | Mélanie Vincelette | Polynie | |
| 2013 | Éric Dupont | La Fiancée américaine | |
| 2013 | Gilles Archambault | Qui de nous deux | |
| 2013 | Sophie Bienvenu | Et au pire, on se mariera | |
| 2013 | Éric Plamondon | Mayonnaise | |
| 2013 | Larry Tremblay | Le Christ obèse | |
| 2014 | Louis Carmain | Guano | |
| 2014 | Christiane Duchesne | Mensonges | |
| 2014 | Carl Leblanc | Artéfact | |
| 2014 | Patrice Lessard | Nina | |
| 2014 | Sophie Létourneau | Chanson française | |
| 2015 | Larry Tremblay | L'Orangeraie | |
| 2015 | Jean-Paul Beaumier | Fais pas cette tête | |
| 2015 | Michael Delisle | Le Feu de mon père | |
| 2015 | Catherine Mavrikakis | La Ballade d'Ali Baba | |
| 2015 | Andrée A. Michaud | Bondrée | |
| 2016 | Daniel Grenier | L’Année la plus longue | |
| 2016 | Clara B.-Turcotte | Demoiselles-cactus | |
| 2016 | Nicolas Dickner | Six degrés de liberté | |
| 2016 | Patrick Nicol | La Nageuse au milieu du lac | |
| 2016 | Monique Proulx | Ce qu’il reste de moi | |
| 2017 | Christian Guay-Poliquin | Le Poids de la neige | |
| 2017 | Fanny Britt | Les Maisons | |
| 2017 | Serge Lamothe | Mektoub | |
| 2017 | Chloé Savoie-Bernard | Des femmes savantes | |
| 2017 | David Turgeon | Le Continent de plastique | |
| 2018 | Jean-Philippe Baril Guérard | Royal | |
| 2018 | Jean-François Caron | De bois debout | |
| 2018 | Abla Farhoud | Au grand soleil cachez vos filles | |
| 2018 | Stéphane Larue | Le Plongeur | |
| 2018 | Audrée Wilhelmy | Le Corps des bêtes | |
| 2019 | Jean-Christophe Réhel | Ce qu’on respire sur Tatouine | |
| 2019 | Lula Carballo | Créatures du hasard | |
| 2019 | Dominique Fortier | Les Villes de papier | |
| 2019 | Karoline Georges | De synthèse | |
| 2019 | Kevin Lambert | Querelle de Roberval | |

=== 2020s ===
| Year | Author | Title | Ref |
|---|---|---|---|
| 2020 | Naomi Fontaine | Shuni | |
| 2020 | Élisabeth Benoit | Suzanne Travolta | |
| 2020 | Louis Carmain | Les offrandes | |
| 2020 | Simon Leduc | L'évasion d'Arthur ou la commune d'Hochelaga | |
| 2020 | Alexie Morin | Ouvrir son cœur | |
| 2021 | Paul Kawczak | Ténèbre | |
| 2021 | Jean-Pierre Gorkynian | Tireur embusqué | |
| 2021 | Mélissa Grégoire | Une joie sans remède | |
| 2021 | Sophie Létourneau | Chasse à l'homme | |
| 2021 | Pierre Samson | Le Mammouth | |
| 2022 | Caroline Dawson | Là où je me terre | |
| 2022 | Chris Bergeron | Valide | |
| 2022 | Fanie Demeule | Mukbang | |
| 2022 | Alain Farah | Mille secrets mille dangers | |
| 2022 | Paul Serge Forest | Tout est ori | |
| 2023 | Francis Ouellette | Mélasse de fantaisie | |
| 2023 | Maxime Raymond Bock | Morel | |
| 2023 | Elsa Pépin | Le fil du vivant | |
| 2023 | Monique Proulx | Enlève la nuit | |
| 2023 | Dominique Scali | Les marins ne savent pas nager | |
| 2024 | Emmanuelle Pierrot | La version qui n’intéresse personne | |
| 2024 | Éric Chacour | Ce que je sais de toi | |
| 2024 | Louis-Daniel Godin | Le compte est bon | |
| 2024 | Mikella Nicol | Mise en forme | |
| 2024 | Jean-Christophe Réhel | La blague du siècle | |
| 2025 | Sophie Lalonde-Roux | Poudreuse | |
| 2025 | Mélikah Abdelmoumen | Petite-Ville | |
| 2025 | Sébastien Dulude | Amiante | |
| 2025 | Jean-Michel Fortier | Tout me revient maintenant | |
| 2025 | Jean-Philippe Pleau | Rue Duplessis | |
| 2026 | Maude Jarry | La mère des larves | |
| 2026 | Naomi Fontaine | Eka Ashate/Ne flanche | |
| 2026 | Kev Lambert | Les sentiers de neige | |
| 2026 | Geneviève Rioux | Même pas morte | |
| 2026 | Alex Viens | Combustion libre | |
| 2027 | Mélina Cornejo | Héritage | |
| 2027 | Charles Dionne | Les Ravisseuses | |
| 2027 | Christian Guay-Poliquin | Le Mur | |
| 2027 | Manar K | Arkhê | |
| 2027 | Amélie Panneton | Chevrotine | |
