= Jean-François Caron =

Jean-François Caron may refer to:

- Jean-François Caron (politician)
- Jean-François Caron (strongman)
- Jean-François Caron (writer)
