= Sade Prize =

French literary award

The prix Sade is a French literary prize created in 2001, sometimes called the Sade Prize in English, as a homage to the marquis de Sade.

== History ==
Founded by Lionel Aracil and Frédéric Beigbeder, it is awarded by a jury as a "meeting of authors, publishers and other artists for the celebration of contemporary libertinism", the Sade prize is awarded each year at the end of September in honor of the "singular author and honest man, according to the definition of his century. An authentic liberal who will have succeeded, beyond the vicissitudes of the Revolution and the hold of the moral order, to undo the shackles of literature as well as those of politics."

The winner receives work from a contemporary artist, including in recent years Éric Madeleine, Nobuyoshi Araki, Alberto Sorbelli, Fabrice Hybert, and Jean-Paul Gaultier.

== Award winners ==
=== Sade Prize ===
- 2001 – Catherine Millet, The Sexual Life of Catherine M.
- 2002 – Alain Robbe-Grillet, Gradiva (C'est Gradiva qui vous appelle)
- 2003 – Louis Skorecki, Il entrerait dans la légende
- 2005 – Jean Streff, Traité du fétichisme à l'usage des jeunes générations
- 2006 – Shozo Numa, Yapou, bétail humain
- 2007 – Dennis Cooper, The Sluts
- 2008 – Charles Robinson, Génie du proxénétisme
- 2009 – Stéphane Velut, Cadence
- 2010 – Jacques Chessex, Le Dernier Crâne de M. de Sade
- 2011 – Thomas Hairmont, Le Coprophile
- 2012 – Christine Angot, Une semaine de vacances – refused by the author
- 2013 – Jean-Baptiste Del Amo, Pornographia
- 2014 – Alain Guiraudie, Now the Night Begins (Ici commence la nuit)
- 2015 – Jean-Noël Orengo, La Fleur du Capital, and Audrée Wilhelmy, Les Sangs
- 2016 – Agnès Giard, Un désir d'humain, les Love Doll au Japon
- 2017 – Gay Talese, The Voyeur's Motel
- 2018 – Jonathan Littell, Une vieille histoire
- 2019 – Kevin Lambert, Querelle de Roberval and Christophe Siébert, Métaphysique de la viande
- 2020 – Marie-Pier Lafontaine, Chienne
- 2021 – Caroline De Mulder, Manger Bambi
- 2022 - Charlotte Bourlard, L’Apparence du vivant
- 2023 - Grégory Le Floch, Gloria, Gloria
- 2024 - Pauline Mari, L’Art assassin. Sur la figure de l’artiste criminel
- 2025 - Agnès Michaux, Huysmans vivant

=== Sade Prize for First Novel ===
- 2001 – Éric Bénier-Bürckel for Un prof bien sous tout rapport, éd. Pétrelle
- 2017 – Raphaël Eymery for Pornarina : la-prostituée-à-tête-de-cheval, éd. Denoël

=== Sade Prize for Non-Fiction ===
- 2004 – Ruwen Ogien for Penser la pornographie, éd. PUF
- 2011 – Paul B. Preciado for Pornotopia: An Essay on Playboy’s Architecture and Biopolitics, éd. Climats

=== Sade Prize for Works of Art ===
- 2006 – Jacques Henric and Jorge Amat for Obsessions nocturnes, éditions Édite
- 2018 – Mavado Charon for Dirty, Mania Press
- 2019 – Jean-Jacques Lequeu, bâtisseur de fantasmes, Éditions Norma / Bibliothèque Nationale de France (catalogue d'exposition)

=== Sade Jury Prize ===
- 2009 – Pierre Bourgeade pour Éloge des fétichistes, éd. Tristram

=== Sade Prize for Memoirs ===
- 2012 – Jean-Pierre Bourgeron pour l'édition de trois textes de la collection « Eros singuliers » (éditions HumuS) : L'Aviateur fétichiste (2012), Marthe de Sainte-Anne (2011) et Le Curé travesti (2011)
- 2015 – Trois milliards de pervers : grande encyclopédie des homosexualités, réédition de l’édition saisie en 1973 (éditions Acratie)
