= Susan Ouriou =

Canadian fiction writer, translator and editor

- Born: Susan Muir; 15 July 1955 (age 71); Red Deer, Alberta, Canada
- Occupations: Writer, translator, editor

Susan Ouriou (born 15 July 1955) is a Canadian fiction writer, literary translator and editor.

== Career ==
Ouriou, née Muir, was born in Red Deer, Alberta, and raised in Calgary, Alberta. She pursued her studies in France, Spain, Quebec and Mexico, obtaining a bachelor's degree in applied foreign languages and a master's degree in translation studies. She has worked as a fiction writer, literary translator and editor and was one of the co-founders of the Banff International Literary Translation Centre (BILTC) at the Banff Centre, where she also served for three years as director.

Ouriou has worked as an interpreter in a variety of capacities, including with the Truth and Reconciliation Commission of Canada.

== Awards ==
The Thirteenth Summer, her translation of José Luis Olaizola's Planicio, was a finalist for the John Glassco Translation Prize in 1994.

Pieces of Me, Ouriou's translation of Charlotte Gingras' La liberté? Connais pas, won the Governor General's Award for French to English translation at the 2009 Governor General's Awards.

She has been shortlisted for the award six other times, for The Road to Chlifa (Michèle Marineau, La Route de Chlifa) at the 1995 Governor General's Awards, for Necessary Betrayals (Guillaume Vigneault, Chercher le vent) at the 2003 Governor General's Awards, as co-translator with Christelle Morelli for Stolen Sisters: The Story of Two Missing Girls, Their Families and How Canada Has Failed Indigenous Women (Emmanuelle Walter, Sœurs volées: Enquête sur un féminicide au Canada) at the 2015 Governor General's Awards, for The Lover, the Lake (Virginia Pésémapéo Bordeleau, L'amant du lac) at the 2021 Governor General's Awards, for White Resin (Audrée Wilhelmy, Blanc Résine) at the 2022 Governor General's Awards, and for Kukum (Michel Jean) at the 2023 Governor General's Awards.

Ouriou and Morelli also jointly won a Libris Award in 2014 for Jane, the Fox and Me, their translation of Fanny Britt's Jane, le renard et moi.

One of her short stories, "Violette Bicyclette" (Alberta Views, 2008), won the Western Canadian Magazines Association's Fiction Award, and her first novel Damselfish was shortlisted for the Writers Guild of Alberta's Georges Bugnet Fiction Award and the City of Calgary's W.O. Mitchell Book Prize. Her short stories have been translated into Spanish, French, Dutch and Bulgarian.

In 2010, Ouriou was appointed a Chevalier in France's Ordre des Arts et des Lettres.

== Publications ==
=== Fiction ===
- Damselfish (XYZ Publishing, 2003)
- Nathan (Red Deer Press, 2016)
- The Recipe (Loft on Eighth, 2018)
- The Stuff of Life (Short Édition, 2019)

=== Selected translations ===
- 1993 - The Thirteenth Summer (José Luis Olaizola, Planicio)
- 1998 - The Road to Chlifa (Michèle Marineau, La Route de Chlifa)
- 2002 - Necessary Betrayals (Guillaume Vigneault, Chercher le vent)
- 2009 - Pieces of Me (Charlotte Gingras, La Liberté? Connais pas)
- 2013 - Jane, the Fox and Me, a co-translation with Christelle Morelli (Fanny Britt, Jane, le renard et moi)
- 2015 - Stolen Sisters: The Story of Two Missing Girls, Their Families and How Canada Has Failed Indigenous Women and Girls, a co-translation with Christelle Morelli (Emmanuelle Walter, Sœurs volées: Enquête sur un féminicide au Canada)
- 2017 - Winter Child, a co-translation with Christelle Morelli (Virginia Pésémapéo Bordeleau, L'enfant hiver)
- 2017 - Louis Undercover, a co-translation with Christelle Morelli (Fanny Britt, Louis parmi les spectres)
- 2018 - Ophelia, a co-translation with Christelle Morelli (Charlotte Gingras, Ophélie)
- 2019 - The Body of the Beasts (Audrée Wilhelmy, Le Corps des bêtes)
- 2019 - Blue Bear Woman, a co-translation with Christelle Morelli (Virginia Pésémapéo Bordeleau, Ourse bleue)
- 2021 - The Lover, the Lake (Virginia Pésémapéo Bordeleau, L'Amant du lac)
- 2022 - White Resin (Audrée Wilhelmy, Blanc Résine)
- 2023 - The Future (Catherine Leroux, L'avenir)
- 2023 - Kukum (Michel Jean)
- 2024 - Sugaring Off (Fanny Britt, Faire les sucres)

=== Edited anthologies ===
- Beyond Words: Translating the World (Banff Centre Press, 2010)
- Languages of Our Land: Indigenous Poems and Stories from Quebec (Banff Centre Press, 2014)
