= Lee Kun-Yong =

South Korean artist (born 1941)

Lee Kun-Yong (Korean: 이건용; born 1941) is a South Korean artist known for his performance art in the 1970s. Lee was a pioneer in this movement with notable works such as Corporal Term (1971/2023), the "Events" series (1975) and Bodyscapes (1976). These series paved the way for a new kind of experimental art, and additionally were subversive acts against Park Chung Hee's authoritarian regime of the 1970s. Lee was a founding member of the Space & Time Group (ST) and a member of the Korean Avant-Garde Association (AG Group).

== Early life ==
Lee Kun-Yong was born in 1941 in Sariwon, Korea, Empire of Japan, to a nurse mother and Protestant minister father. Sariwon is a small city south of Pyongyang. His early life was dedicated to reading, influenced by his father, and discovering foreign culture through French and German cultural centers in Seoul. Lee took a particular interest in art books, found in the embassies and cultural centers he frequented, beginning his artistic journey by contemplating what art truly is. Despite his mother's wishes for him to become a doctor, Lee enrolled in Hongik University's College of Fine Arts in 1963. He earned his BFA from Hongik University in 1967, and an MA in art education from Keimyung University in 1982. His time at Hongik University aligned with the Informel movement of the 1950s, focused on abstract painting and the main movement taught in Korean art programs which was a response to the suffocating darkness, chaos, and suffering that followed the Korean War. Lee, however, found it boring.

== Career and notable works ==
=== Space & Time Group (ST) ===
Lee formed the Space & Time Group (ST) in 1969, a collective of artists who read and applied art theory to their work during the authoritarian governments of Park Chung Hee and his successors. The ST group and the similar AG Group were counter-cultural. Lee and his contemporaries were simultaneously inside and outside the culture, performing both in the streets and in state-led galleries.

=== Corporal Term (1971) ===
Lee often considered art as a means to push the boundaries of uselessness. His first acclaimed work, Corporal Term, exemplifies this thought process. Corporal Term is considered Lee's groundbreaking work—literally. In 1971, Lee dragged a tree trunk, roots and dirt included, into the exhibition space at the National Museum of Modern and Contemporary Art in Seoul, reimagining the boundaries of the exhibition space and the use of the human body and manual labor in art. In 1970s Korea, the Yusin government restricted the freedoms of Koreans and focused on economic development and prosperity. Corporal Term was in part a rebellion against the ideals of the state which were focused on productivity and advancement. Further, the work emphasizes the connection between the body and space, acting as a medium between the body and the world. Through subversive acts of uselessness, Lee challenged the regime and developed the unique style that became performance art in Korea. Despite this, Lee's Corporal Term, was chosen to represent Korea in the 8th Paris Biennale in 1973 as the Korean government was intent on leveling Korea art with contemporary Western art.

=== "Event-Logical" series (1975) ===
Throughout the 1970s, Lee's work evolved as he continued to question the position of the body as subject, object, medium and manifestation. In 1975, while working with the ST group, Lee began a series of performances called "Events." The "Events" series was distinct from the Euro-American happenings; it was logical and filled with intent. Here, he first presented Same Area (1975) and Indoor Measurement (1975) in the Baekrok Gallery in Seoul. These performances consisted of repetitive, small actions, such as in Five Steps (1975). In Five Steps (1975), Lee would stand from sitting in a chair, take five steps forward, and draw a line where he stopped. Despite the repetition of similar movement, the performance resulted in a series of lines that were in different places, showing the nuances within repetition. Lee introduced the name "Logical Event" to further communicate this idea, and later inverted the title to "Event-Logical," placing emphasis on the event and finalizing the name and intent of the series. These performances were documented through photograph in collaboration with his peers, such as Sung Neung Kyung.

=== Logic of Place (1975) ===
Logic of Place (1975) was a performance piece in which Lee performed on a playground, likely in South Korea. In this piece, Lee draws a circle on the ground, moving across and around the circle, declaring where he is at each stop with the words "here," "there," and "where?". Here, he questions the relationship between the body and the space around it.

=== Bodyscapes (1976) ===
Lee continued to use his body as central to his art. Bodyscapes (1976) were a series of paintings in which Lee was restricted to painting around or by his body. In these, his body became the medium between the paint and the canvas. His method of painting acts as a recording of movement, often repetitive movements similar to the "Event-Logical" series. Similar to the "Event-Logical" series, Bodyscapes was photographed by South Korean contemporary artists, Sung Neung Kyung.

=== Recent work ===
Lee's work between the 1980s and 2010s has been sparse, but beginning in the 2020s, Lee has been recreating many of his works from the 70s. He has re-performed works such as Eating Biscuit (1975), Logic of Place (1975), Snail's Gallop (1979), The Method of Drawing 76-2 (1976), The Method of Drawing 76-4 (1976), and Terrorism is an Enemy of Humankind (2012). In 2023, Lee recreated Corporal Term in 2023 during a similarly polarizing moment in Korean politics. Lee continues to create new art and recreate old art. His experimentation and apt for novelty persists forty years after his debut in experimental art.

Between late 2023 and early 2024, the Guggenheim put on an exhibition, originally held at the National Museum of Modern and Contemporary Art, Korea, showcasing Lee and his contemporaries' works, called Only the Young: Experimental Art in Korea, 1960s-1970s.

== Reception and influence ==
Lee's career grew during the 1970s when South Korea was governed under the Fourth Republic of Korea and most notably President Park Chung Hee. Park's government was authoritarian, and autocratic. It focused on economic growth, and saw large success, but dramatically decreased civil liberties for South Korean citizens. Mainly, censorship was employed in all forms of media, further affecting artists and creatives like Lee Kun-Yong and his contemporaries. Lee's main medium, performance art, was especially scrutinized by the South Korean government. Despite the government's censorship of art by Lee and others, they allowed artists including Lee to serve as national delegates in international biennales and other exhibitions.
