= Virginie Blanchette-Doucet =

Canadian novelist

Virginie Blanchette-Doucet (born 1989 in Val-d'Or, Quebec) is a Canadian novelist from Quebec. Her debut novel, 117 Nord, was a shortlisted finalist for the Governor General's Award for French-language fiction at the 2017 Governor General's Awards and for the Prix France-Québec.
