= Audrée Wilhelmy =

Canadian writer (born 1985)

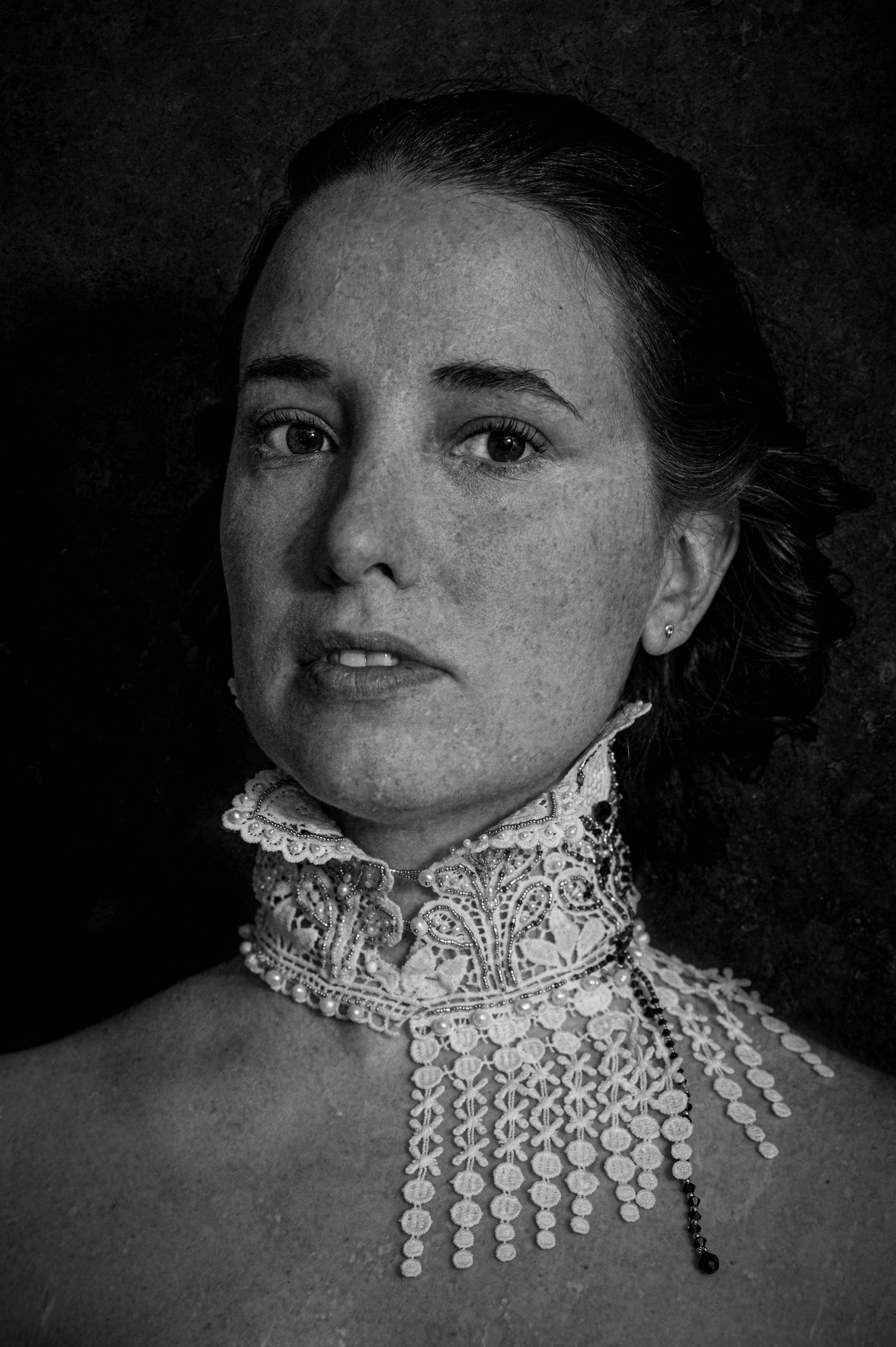
- Wilhelmy, 2022.
- Born: 6 October 1985 (age 40); Cap-Rouge, Quebec, Canada
- Occupation: Writer
- Writing career
- Period: 2010s–present
- Notable works: The Body of the Beasts; White Resin
- Website: atelier-wilhelmy.com

Audrée Wilhelmy (born 6 October 1985) is a Canadian writer from Quebec.

== Biography ==
After obtaining a bachelor's degree in creative writing from the Université du Québec à Montréal (2008), she continued studying the relationship between texts and images at McGill University (2008–2010) as part of a thesis in research-creation for the Department of French Literature. Entitled Le Roman de la Rose: représentations allégoriques et transformations iconographiques du manuscrit à l'imprimé, the "research" part of her thesis was awarded the Isabel Bilingsley Prize for best thesis in French studies (2011) and she graduated on the dean's honor list.

The "creation" part of her thesis, which she entitled La Petite, was published under the title Oss by Éditions Leméac in 2011. It involved re-writing traditional tales, creating an amoral, ageographical and atemporal voice and delving into the female relationship to the body, to violence and to nature. In 2012, the novel was shortlisted for the Prix des libraires du Québec and for the Governor General's Award for French-language fiction.

Her second novel, Les Sangs, was written for the doctorate she undertook at the Université du Québec à Montréal (2010–2015) on the study and practice of the arts. During that time, Wilhelmy continued her specialization in creative writing and her research into the text-image connection. Awarded the Vanier Canada Graduate Scholarship in 2012, she interviewed writers from her community to develop a typology of writers' drawings in the field of creative writing, all while working on her novel.

Les Sangs, a re-writing of "Bluebeard", deals with women's freedom, agency, desires and entitlement to personal sovereignty. It was published by Éditions Leméac in August 2013 and then again by France's Éditions Grasset in March 2015. In Quebec, the novel was short-listed for the Prix des libraires du Québec (2014) and the Prix France-Québec (2014), while in France, it was a co-winner of the Sade Prize (2015). The text was adapted for the theatre by Camila Forteza and Anneke Brier (directed by Camila Forteza) in May 2017 and by Jean-François Guilbault in June 2018. In September of that same year, it appeared in Spanish under the title Las Sangres from the publisher Hoja de Lata in a translation by Luisa Lucuix. It was then translated into Galician by Moisés Barcia (Os Sangues, published by Rinoceronte Editora, 2020). The Italian translation by Silvia Turato appeared in 2023 with Éditions Cencellada.

In January 2014, she was the first Quebec woman to receive the writer grant from France's Fondation Jean-Luc Lagardère. After defending her thesis, entitled L'image en amont du texte littéraire (The Image Upstream of the Literary Text), she continued her work on research-creation beginning in January 2016 as part of a post-graduate course at the Université de Montréal. She studied, among others, the impact of digital images in the approach adopted by contemporary writers. In October 2016, she was welcomed by the French Academy in Rome to a writing residency at Villa Medici.

In December 2017, she decided to devote herself full-time to her work as a novelist. Unaffiliated with any university, she continued teaching on an occasional basis. She has participated in local and international cultural events, literary festivals and book fairs.

Her third novel, Le Corps des bêtes, charts the life of a family isolated from the rest of the world. The father, a lighthouse keeper, takes his children to the furthermost limits of a seashore separated from the nearest village by a forest. The book was published by Éditions Leméac in August 2017 and by Éditions Grasset in March 2018. That same year, the novel was shortlisted for the Prix des libraires du Québec and the Prix littéraire des collégiens as well as the Prix du roman d'écologie 2019. It was published in English on September 3, 2019, with the title The Body of the Beasts by House of Anansi Press in a translation by Susan Ouriou.

In October, November and December 2018, she was welcomed as writer-in-residence at the Banff Centre. There, she worked on her fourth novel, Blanc Résine, centred around the meeting of Daã, a young woman raised by 24 women in the boreal forest, and Laure, an albino man born in a coal mine. It was published in September 2019 by Éditions Leméac and in September 2021 in Susan Ouriou's English translation, White Resin, by House of Anansi Press. Shortlisted for the Grand prix du livre de Montréal 2020 and the Prix des libraires du Québec 2020, the novel was published in France by Éditions Grasset in January 2022. That same year, it was shortlisted for the Prix Cazes. In May 2022, it won the award Prix Ouest-France Étonnants Voyageurs. Susan Ouriou was also nominated for the Governor General's Award for French to English translation at the 2022 Governor General's Awards for her English translation.

In 2021, Wilhelmy published her fifth book, Plie la rivière, with Éditions Leméac. It follows the encounter of a young woman and a bear. That same year, she created L'Atelier: exercice de vulnérabilité, a digital project for which she received the Prix Ambassadeur Web Télé-Québec 2021 at the Grands Prix Desjardins de la culture de Lanaudière. The web platform includes texts by a number of female writers reflecting on their writing process as well as a detailed journal on her own creative process.

In the fall of 2021, she founded Presses du Bûcher, a publishing house devoted to the artisanal production of artists' books.

In 2022, Éditions Alto published the game Clairvoyantes, which she conceived, designed and piloted. The divinatory game brought together fifteen women writers as well as the photographer Justine Latour, whose works accompany the texts. In all, over forty women took part in the project which Wilhelmy oversaw. For this project, she was a finalist for the CALQ Artiste de l'année prize.

In September 2023, she published Peau-de-Sang, once again with Leméac Éditeur. At the same time, she announced her departure from the publishing house Grasset, and a few weeks later, she revealed that she was joining the publishing house Le Tripode, which now carries her work in France.

=== Books ===
- 2011 : Oss, Montreal: Leméac.
- 2013 : Les Sangs, Montreal: Leméac.
- 2017 : Le Corps des bêtes, Montreal: Leméac.
- 2019 : Blanc Résine, Montreal: Leméac.
- 2021 : Plie la rivière, Montreal: Leméac.
- 2022 : Clairvoyantes, Quebec: Alto.
- 2023 : Peau-de-Sang, Montreal: Leméac.

=== Short stories ===
- 2011 : "La Pièce montée", in Le monstre n'est pas celui qu'on croit, France : Éditions Rhubarbes.
- 2012 : "La Femme du Général", Zinc, no. 27.
- 2013 : "La Méduse".
- 2014 : "La Balançoire", À l'essai, no. 1.
- 2014 : "Peau de Sucre", Jet d'encre, no. 23.
- 2015 : "Envie: lettre à une autre génération", Les Libraires, no. 87.
- 2015 : "Petite Fleur", Revue XYZ, no. 121.
- 2015 : "Les Jours charnels", La Presse.
- 2016 : "Sujet: tapis", Opuscule.
- 2017 : "Ada en première", Nouveau Projet, no. 10.
- 2017 : "La bête au corps", Lettres québécoises, no. 167.
- 2017 : "La Colombe", in Pulpe, edited by Stéphane Dompierre, Montréal: Québec Amérique.
- 2019 : "Daã", in Voix d'écrivaines francophones, edited by Fawzia Zouari, Orléans: Regain de lecture.
- 2019: "Pointe-Lévy", Estuaire, no. 177.

== Awards and nominations ==
| Year | Nominated work | Award | Category | Result | Ref. |
|---|---|---|---|---|---|
| 2012 | Oss | Prix des libraires du Québec | Roman-Nouvelles-Récit | Longlist | |
| 2012 | Oss | Governor General's Award | French-language fiction | Finalist | |
| 2014 | Les sangs | Prix des libraires du Québec | Roman-Nouvelles-Récit | Finalist | |
| 2014 | Les sangs | Prix France-Québec | — | Finalist | |
| 2015 | Les sangs | Prix des lecteurs de L'Hebdo | Roman | Finalist | |
| 2015 | Les sangs | Prix Marie Claire du roman féminin | — | Finalist | |
| 2015 | Les sangs | Sade Prize | — | Winner | |
| 2018 | Le Corps des bêtes | Prix SGDL Révélation | Romans | Longlist | |
| 2018 | Le Corps des bêtes | Prix des libraires du Québec | Roman-Nouvelles-Récit | Longlist | |
| 2018 | Le Corps des bêtes | Prix littéraire des collégiens | — | Finalist | |
| 2019 | Le Corps des bêtes | Prix du roman d'écologie | — | Finalist | |
| 2020 | Blanc Résine | Prix des libraires du Québec | Roman-Nouvelles-Récit | Finalist | |
| 2020 | Blanc Résine | Grand prix du livre de Montréal | — | Longlist | |
| 2021 | L'Atelier: Exercice de vulnérabilité | Grands Prix Desjardins de la culture de Lanaudière | Prix Ambassadeur Web Télé-Québec | Winner | |
| 2022 | Blanc Résine | Prix Cazes | — | Finalist | |
| 2022 | Blanc Résine | Prix Habiter le Monde | — | Finalist | |
| 2022 | Blanc Résine | Prix Ouest-France Étonnants Voyageurs | — | Winner | |
| 2022 | — | Prix CALQ | Artiste de l'année dans Lanaudière | Finalist | |
