= 2017 Governor General's Awards =

Canadian literary award

The shortlisted nominees for the 2017 Governor General's Awards for Literary Merit were announced on October 4, 2017, and the winners were announced on November 1.

== English ==
Category	Winner	Nominated
Fiction	Joel Thomas Hynes, We'll All Be Burnt in Our Beds Some Night	Michael Kaan, The Water Beetles; Alison MacLeod, All the Beloved Ghosts; Jocelyn Parr, Uncertain Weights and Measures; Kathleen Winter, Lost in September
Non-fiction	Graeme Wood, The Way of the Strangers: Encounters with the Islamic State	Sharon Butala, Where I Live Now: A Journey through Love and Loss to Healing and Hope; Sarah de Leeuw, Where It Hurts; Elaine Dewar, The Handover: How Bigwigs and Bureaucrats Transferred Canada's Best Publisher and the Best Part of our Literary Heritage to a Foreign Multinational; Carol Off, All We Leave Behind: A Reporter's Journey into the Lives of Others
Poetry	Richard Harrison, On Not Losing My Father's Ashes in the Flood	Lorna Crozier, What the Soul Doesn't Want; Nora Gould, Selah; Benjamin Hertwig, Slow War; Julia McCarthy, All the Names Between
Drama	Hiro Kanagawa, Indian Arm	Robert Chafe, The Colony of Unrequited Dreams; Anna Chatterton, Within the Glass; Michael Healey, 1979; Kate Hennig, The Virgin Trial
Children's literature	Cherie Dimaline, The Marrow Thieves	Alison Hughes, Hit the Ground Running; Aviaq Johnston, Those Who Run in the Sky; Allan Stratton, The Way Back Home; Danielle Younge-Ullman, Everything Beautiful Is Not Ruined
Children's illustration	David Robertson and Julie Flett, When We Were Alone	Marie-Louise Gay, Short Stories for Little Monsters; Paul Harbridge and Matt James, When the Moon Comes; Joanne Schwartz and Sydney Smith, Town Is By the Sea; Jan Thornhill, The Tragic Tale of the Great Auk
French to English translation	Oana Avasilichioaei, Readopolis (Bertrand Laverdure, Lectodôme)	Katia Grubisic, Brothers (David Clerson, Frères); Howard Scott, Social Myths and Collective Imaginaries (Gérard Bouchard, Raison et déraison du mythe); Pablo Strauss, The Longest Year (Daniel Grenier, L'année la plus longue); W. Donald Wilson, In Search of New Babylon (Dominique Scali, À la recherche de New Babylon)

== French ==
Category	Winner	Nominated
Fiction	Christian Guay-Poliquin, Le Poids de la neige	Virginie Blanchette-Doucet, 117 Nord; Mylène Bouchard, L'Imparfaite Amitié; Michael Delisle, Le Palais de la fatigue; Stéphane Larue, Le Plongeur
Non-fiction	Serge Bouchard, Les Yeux tristes de mon camion	Benoît Côté, Propositions de clarté; Daniel Grenier, La solitude de l'écrivain de fond; Nicolas Lévesque, Je sais trop bien ne pas exister; Ouanessa Younsi, Soigner, aimer
Poetry	Louise Dupré, La Main hantée	Jean-Marc Desgent, Strange Fruits; Annie Lafleur, Bec-de-lièvre; Judy Quinn, Pas de tombeau pour les lieux; Serge Patrice Thibodeau, L'Isle Haute en marge de Grand-Pré
Drama	Sébastien David, Dimanche napalm	Nathalie Boisvert, Antigone au printemps; Emma Haché, Exercice de l'oubli; Suzanne Lebeau, Trois petites sœurs; Kevin McCoy, Norge
Children's literature	Véronique Drouin, L'importance de Mathilde Poisson	Annie Bacon, Chroniques post-apocalyptiques d'une enfant sage; Jocelyn Boisvert, Les Moustiques; Roxane Desjardins, Moi qui marche à tâtons dans ma jeunesse noire; K. Lambert, L'élixir du baron Von Rezine
Children's illustration	Jacques Goldstyn, Azadah	Pascal Blanchet, En voiture! L'Amérique en chemin de fer; Fanny Britt and Isabelle Arsenault, Louis parmi les spectres; Christiane Duchesne and Marion Arbona, Fred Petitchatminou; Renée Robitaille and Slavka Kolesar, La légende de Carcajou
English to French translation	Daniel Poliquin, Un barbare en Chine nouvelle (Alexandre Trudeau, Barbarian Lost: Travels in the New China)	Carole Noël and Marianne Noël-Allen, Le Sans-papiers (Lawrence Hill, The Illegal); Paule Noyart, La disparition d'Heinrich Schlögel (Martha Baillie, The Search for Heinrich Schlögel); Lori Saint-Martin and Paul Gagné, Premières lueurs : mon combat contre le trouble de stress post-traumatique (Roméo Dallaire, Waiting for First Light: My Ongoing Battle with PTSD); Sophie Voillot, Le sous-majordome (Patrick deWitt, Undermajordomo Minor)
