= Roxane Desjardins =

Canadian writer (born 1991)

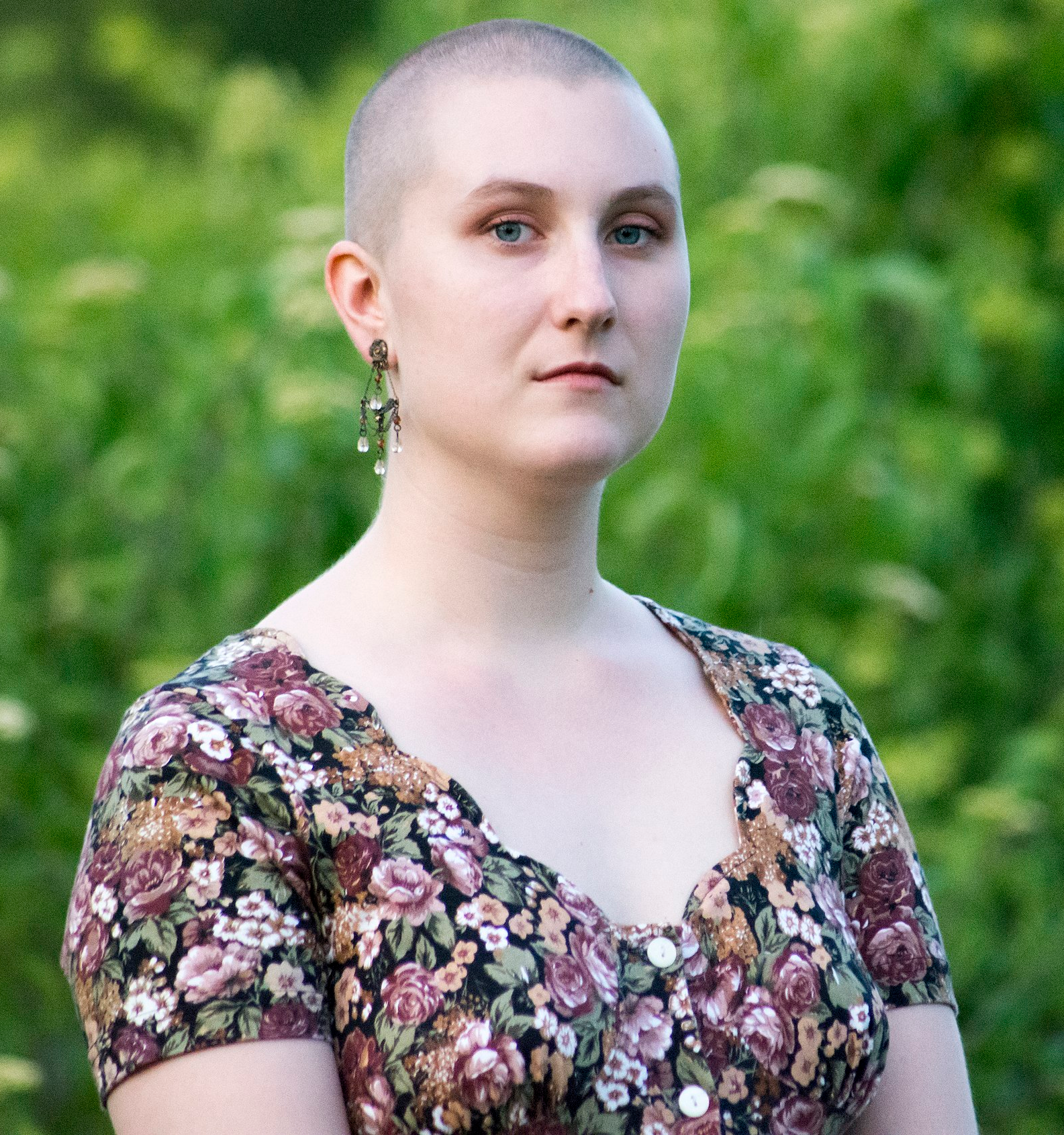
- Desjardins in 2016
- Born: 1991 (age 34–35) Montreal, Quebec, Canada
- Occupation: Writer; editor; general manager
- Language: French
- Genre: Poetry

Roxane Desjardins (born 1991) is a Canadian writer from Quebec. She is the editor and general manager of the publishing house, Les Herbes rouges.

== Biography ==
Roxane Desjardins was born in Montreal in 1991.

She began her literary practice with the artist's book and the fanzine. Her first collection of poetry, Ciseaux, was published in 2014 by Les Herbes rouges. She won the Prix Émile-Nelligan as well as the Prix Félix-Leclerc de la poésie and was longlisted for the Prix des libraires du Québec. In 2016, her story, Moi qui marche à tâtons dans ma jeunesse noire, was published by Les Herbes Rouges, for which she was a finalist for the 2017 Governor General's Awards for Literary Merit.

Desjardins served on the editorial board of the magazine Moebius between 2016 and 2018. Le Revers, her second collection of poetry, was published by Herbes Rouges in 2018, and was a finalist for the 2018 Governor General's Awards for Literary Merit. These three works received critical acclaim. The same year, she published La Poésie des Herbes rouges, an anthology co-edited with Jean-Simon DesRochers. Desjardins became publisher and general manager of Les Herbes rouges in 2021.

== Prizes and honours ==
- 2013, Prix Expozine for the best French-language book for Cannibale maison
- 2014, Prix Émile-Nelligan for Ciseaux
- 2015, Prix Félix-Leclerc for Ciseaux
- 2015, Longlisted for Prix des libraires du Québec pour Ciseaux
- 2015, Prix Expozine for the best French-language book for Avant le geste
- 2017, Finalist, Governor General's Award of Canada, Children's Literature - Text category, for Moi qui marche à tâtons dans ma jeunesse noire
- 2018, Finalist, Société de développement des périodiques culturels québécois (SODEP) Excellence Award
- 2018, Finalist, Governor General's Award, Poetry category, for Le revers

== Selected works ==
=== Poetry collections ===
- Ciseaux, Montréal, Éditions Les Herbes rouges, 2014, ISBN 9782894194621.
- Le Revers, Montréal, Éditions Les Herbes rouges, 2018, ISBN 9782894196335.

=== Narrative ===
- Moi qui marche à tâtons dans ma jeunesse noire, Montréal, Éditions Les Herbes rouges, 2016, ISBN 9782894195697.

=== Anthologies ===
- La Poésie des Herbes rouges, co-edited with Jean-Simon DesRochers, Montréal, Éditions Les Herbes rouges, 2018, ISBN 9782894196717.

=== Zines ===
- Constance succombe, illustrated by Coco-Simone Finken, 2013.
- Cannibale maison, illustrated by Coco-Simone Finken, 2013.
- Avant le geste, in collaboration with Félix Durand, livre d’artiste, 2015.
