= Jocelyn Parr (writer) =

Canadian writer

Jocelyn Parr is a Canadian writer, whose debut novel Uncertain Weights and Measures was a shortlisted finalist for the Governor General's Award for English-language fiction at the 2017 Governor General's Awards. It was also shortlisted for the 2018 Kobo Emerging Writer Prize, longlisted for the 2019 International Dublin Literary Award, and won the QWF's 2017 Concordia University First Book Prize. Uncertain Weights and Measures began as a Masters thesis in the Creative Writing Program at Concordia University. Set in post-revolutionary Moscow, the novel traces the life of a young research scientist working at a brain institute that housed Lenin's brain, and that of the man she loves, Sasha, whose artistic ambitions run afoul of the state-sanctioned aesthetics. A writer for The Walrus suggests the book could "very well be read as a cautionary allegory of our 'brave and visionary time.'" James Gifford, writing for Canadian Literature, writes that the "sustained tension between plot and thought is the novel's greatest success. The reader is pressed to ask challenging questions of history, science, and private life without ever shifting out of the gripping narrative. Uncertain Weights and Measures is clearly a novel of ideas, but it never reads like a treatise or thought experiment, though in a sense it is. Parr was nominated for the Governor General's Award, and her first book declares the opening of an exciting career."

Born in New Zealand, she grew up on the West Coast of Canada and is now a history professor at Dawson College in Montreal, Quebec. Her writing has previously appeared in literary magazines such as Brick, Grain and Matrix.
