= Space & Time Group =

Reading group in Korea

Space & Time Group (ST) was an art and reading group in Korea from 1969 to 1980. The group was led by Lee Kun-yong who focused on studying and applying international art theory to art in order to respond to Yusin Korea's tumultuous socio-political atmosphere in covert ways. Though membership was always changing, the initial assembly of members included Kim Bok-young, Kim Munja, Yeo Yoon, Park Wonjun, Han Jeongmun, and Shin Sung Hy. They held 8 exhibitions, published journals, and held seminars. Of all the avant-garde groups in Korea at the time, ST was the most theoretically rigorous and enthusiastic to learn about and apply European, American, and Japanese art theory. The group is best known for their performances called “events” which put a focus on temporality, space, bodies, actions, and subjectivity over objects.

== History ==
ST was founded by Lee Kun-Yong in 1969 with his classmates from Hongik University, Kim Yong-min and Kim Bok-young. Although membership was constantly in flux, its initial membership included Kim Bok-young, Kim Munja, Yeo Yoon, Park Wonjun, Han Jeongmun, and Shin Sung Hy. The group was born out of a desire to pursue an aesthetic beyond painting and create art inspired by the new art theories and concepts coming into Korea.

Members of ST were primarily from the 4/19 Generation: the generation of Koreans who had lived through the April 19th revolution, the May 16th military coup of Park Chung Hee, the Yushin dictatorship, and the influx of Western pop-culture and individualism. Lee Kun-yong and Kim Bok-young published a newsletter/journal that included some of their writings and also writings of European, Japanese, and American art critics, theorists, and philosophers in order to start rigorous conversations within the Korean art scene.

There were 8 ST exhibitions in total that can be categorized into two ‘eras.’ From 1971 to 1974 ST presented objects or installations. From 1975 on, carefully planned performances called “events” or “logical events” were staged. These “events” were concise and were distinct from earlier performances called “happenings” by Korean avant-garde groups, such as The Fourth Group. The group disbanded in 1980 after their last exhibition, but the individual members went on to pursue individual art careers.

== Artistic ideas ==
From 1971 to 1974 surrealism and Dadaism influenced ST's use of materials in their art objects. However, they transitioned to performance 'events', or more specifically to Lee Kun-yong, 'logical events,' as ST became more exposed to the following literature and authors:

- Joseph Kosuth, “Art after Philosophy”
- Nakahara Yusuke, “Conceptual Art and Concepts of Art”
- Maurice Merleau-Ponty, Phenomenology of Perception
- Ludwig Wittgenstein, Tractatus Logico-Philosophicus
- Lee Ufan, “Phenomenology of Encounter”
- Nishida Kitaro
- Harold Rosenberg, “Myth and Ritual of the Avente-Garde”
- Catherine Millet, “Are you there?”
- Rosalind Krauss

"Logical events" was a term coined by Lee Kun-yong, and it was defined by repetitive and controlled bodily acts found in everyday life. These highly controlled bodily acts critiqued the intense pressures put on the body and mind during the Yushin Era, and they also sought to make people question and reconnect with their bodily agency. Meaningless repetitive acts resisted the instrumentalization of bodies during the intense industrialization period that subjected Koreans to harsh labor conditions.

ST made public art that seemingly mimicked “Western avante-garde” trends that “protested institutionalized art” in order to covertly respond to the oppressive Park Chun-Hee regime.

== Exhibitions and notable works ==
- 1971: ST Member Exhibition, National Public Service Building, Seoul
  - The members exhibited various mediums such as minimalistic objects, dramatic performances, and language games since they wanted to explore post-painting avant-garde art such as surrealism and Dadaism.
- 1973: 2nd ST Member Exhibition Myeongdong Gallery, Seoul
- 1974: 3rd ST Exhibition, National Museum of Modern and Contemporary Art
  - Newspapers: From June 1, 1974, Sung Neung-kyung: To critique the censorship taking place in Korean news and media, Sung collected newspapers and then cut the articles out and put them in a clear acrylic box until there were only ads and pictures left on the newspaper. The slips of paper in the acrylic box evoked a voting box full of ballots.
- 1975: The 4th ST Exhibition, National Museum of Modern and Contemporary, Seoul
  - Logic of Place: Lee Kun-yong presented new performances that highlighted logical inevitability of sequence of actions. One of the representative works of Lee's 'logical event' theory was Logic of Place. Lee first drew a circle on the floor, then he relocated himself in and around the circle while announcing "there," "here," "there," and "where" in order to show how there is limitless perceptions and subjective ways to relate your body to language and space.
- 1976: Event-Logical exhibition
  - The Method of Drawing 76-1, Lee Kun-Yong: In this 'logical event,' Lee Kun-yong painted strokes on a piece of plywood from behind it in order to make marks from limiting positions. Everytime he stood behind the plywood board and painted as much of the board as he could, he would then walk around to the front of the board to saw off the freshly painted parts of wood. He painted in this manner 4 times and sawed those colored pieces of the board off 3 times. The varying size and length of the marks made on the plywood show how agency is shared between the artist and the material since the part of plywood blocks the artist's movement.
- 1976: The 5th ST Exhibition
- 1977: The 6th ST Exhibition
- 1980: final ST exhibition

== Reception ==
ST was rejected by the state-subsidized art institutions since they did not work in the recognized mediums of western oil painting, ink painting, and sculpture.Their public exhibitions were closely scrutinized by the police since all types of public assembly were tightly monitored. Paradoxically, the Korean government would send artists from ST to be representatives at international biennials and triennials since Korean avant-garde groups caught the interest of the world art community.

Contemporaneous art critics like Lee Kyung-sung and Yu Jun-sang did not take ST's activities seriously, calling them “culturally immature,” “a deformed art phenomenon,” and “too academic.” ST's intense focus on theory and concept was seen as esoteric even though it was partially out of necessity that their art had to be shrouded by claims of artistic development in order for it to not be censured.

== Participants ==
- Lee Kun-yong (leader)
- Kim Bok-young (co-leader)
- Kim Munja
- Yeo Yoon
- Park Wonjun
- Han Jeongmun
- Shin Sung Hy
- Others include: Chang Hwa-jin, Choi Hyo-joo, Kim Yong-min, Kim Yong-chul, Kim Sun, Kang Chang-yeol, Ahn Byeong-seok, Chang Suk-won, Kim Jang-sup, Kang Yong-dae, Kim Yong-jin, Kim Yong-ik and Kim Hong-joo
