= Laurent Mailhot =

Canadian historian and writer (1931–2021)

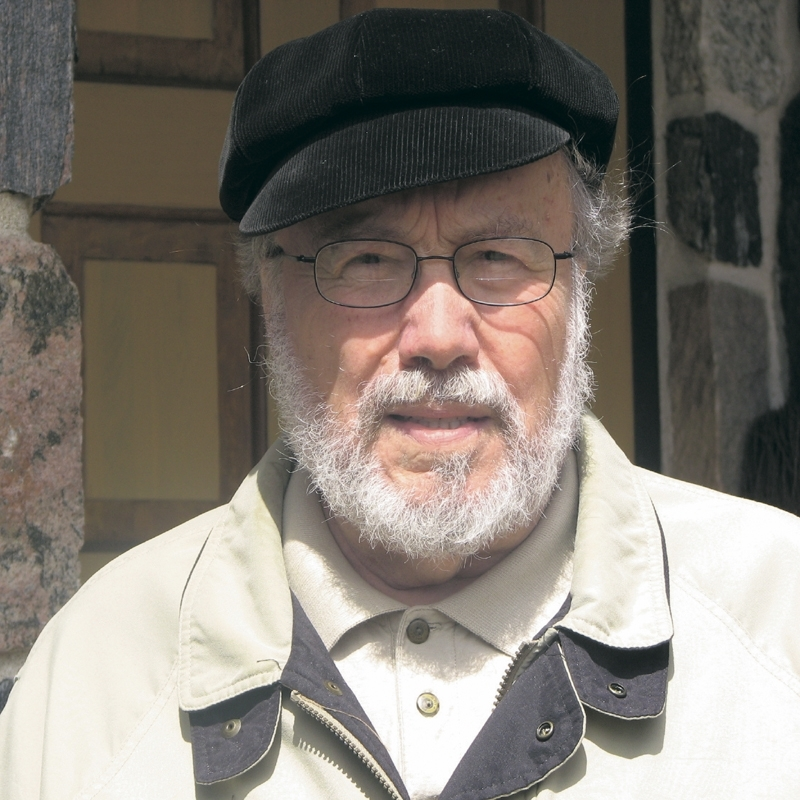
- Laurent Mailhot
- Born: 22 September 1931; Saint-Alexis, Quebec, Canada
- Died: 4 January 2021 (aged 89); Trois-Rivières, Quebec, Canada
- Occupation(s): Historian; Writer

Laurent Mailhot (22 September 1931 – 4 January 2021) was a Canadian historian, writer, professor, essayist, and literary critic.

== Biography ==
Born in Saint-Alexis on 22 September 1931, Mailhot studied at the Séminaire de Joliette. He earned a master's degree from the Université de Montréal and a doctorate from the University of Grenoble. He began teaching at the Université de Montréal in 1963. He was an editor at the journal Études françaises from 1979 to 1987.

Laurent Mailhot died in Trois-Rivières on 4 January 2021 at the age of 89.

== Publications ==
=== Studies ===
- Le théâtre québécois. Introduction à dix dramaturges contemporains (1970)
- Albert Camus ou l’imagination du désert (1973)
- La littérature québécoise (1974)
- Le réel, le réalisme et la littérature québécoise (1974)
- Théâtre québécois II. Nouveaux auteurs, autres spectacles (1980)
- Répertoire pratique de littérature et de culture québécoises (1981)
- Guide culturel du Québec (1982)
- Le Conseil des arts du Canada 1957-1982 (1982)
- Ouvrir le livre (1992)
- La littérature québécoise depuis ses origines (1997)
- Plaisirs de la prose (2005)
- André Brochu, écrivain (2006)

=== Anthologies ===
- Anthologie d'Arthur Buies (1978)
- Monologues québécois : 1890-1980 (1980)
- Le Québec en textes 1940-1980 (1980)
- La poésie québécoise des origines à nos jours. Anthologie (1980)
- Essais québécois 1837-1983. Anthologie littéraire (1984)
- L’essai québécois depuis 1845. Étude et anthologie (2005)

== Distinctions ==
- Prix France-Québec (1981)
- Killam Scholarship (1986)
- Prix André-Laurendeau (1987)
- Member of the Royal Society of Canada (1987)
- Prix de la revue Études françaises for Plaisirs de la prose (2005)
