= The Sexual Life of Catherine M. =

Memoir

- Cover of French paperback edition
- Author: Catherine Millet
- Original title: La Vie Sexuelle de Catherine M.
- Translator: Adriana Hunter
- Language: French
- Genre: Memoir
- Published: 2001
- Publisher: Grove Press
- Publication place: France
- Media type: Print (Hardback)
- Pages: 224 pp
- ISBN: 0-8021-3986-8
- OCLC: 52275327

The Sexual Life of Catherine M. by the art critic Catherine Millet was published in the author's native French in 2001 (as La vie sexuelle de Catherine M.) An English translation by Adriana Hunter was published in 2002. Sexual Life was the subject of mild controversy on both sides of the Atlantic. It was reviewed by Edmund White as "the most explicit book about sex ever written by a woman." The book won the Prix Sade in France.

== Overview ==
The book quickly introduces the theme, with group sex taking place from the fourth page. Despite this explicit content, critics have identified other aspects in the work, with a review in salon.com stating:

...the most shocking thing about “The Sexual Life of Catherine M.,”... is that it isn’t particularly shocking at all. A good quarter of the time, it works as pornography (and I use the term in a descriptive sense, not a judgmental one); the rest of the time it’s a rumination on the nature of desire and pleasure and the experience of living a life that is specifically arranged to let desire and pleasure have their way with you. It’s titillating, explicit, dryly funny and sometimes exceedingly puzzling. The only truly shocking thing about it is that it was written by a straight woman and not a gay man.

In the book, Millet writes of orgies attended by up to 150 people, at which she would have sex with around a quarter of those in attendance. She also debates whether sex outdoors is better in country or urban settings, and why she could never be a prostitute.

Millet writes that she has been in an open marriage with one man since the 1970s, who understands her love of sex with multiple partners.
