= Michael Kaan =

Canadian writer

Michael Kaan is a Canadian writer, whose debut novel The Water Beetles was published in 2017. The novel, a family saga about a young boy's experience during the Japanese invasion of Hong Kong, was based in part on Kaan's father's memoirs.

== Life ==
Kaan, the child of a father from Hong Kong and a Canadian mother, was born in Winnipeg, Manitoba. He completed a degree in English from the University of Manitoba, later completing an MBA in Health Economics from the same institution. He has worked as a healthcare administrator since 2000, primarily in mental health and health research.

== Work ==
The Water Beetles was shortlisted for the Governor General's Award for English-language fiction at the 2017 Governor General's Awards, and won the 2018 amazon.ca First Novel Award, the Margaret Laurence Prize for Fiction, and the McNally Robinson Book of the Year Prize.
