= Art press =

art press
- Type: Monthly
- Editor-in-chief: Catherine Millet
- Editor: Jean-Pierre de Kerraoul
- Founded: 1972
- Language: French and English
- Headquarters: Paris, France
- ISSN: 0245-5676
- Website: artpress.com

art press is a monthly international review of contemporary art. Its first issue was for December 1972–January 1973. The original branding, which has hardly changed since, was by Roger Tallon. Articles are in French and English.

== History ==
In her first editorial, Catherine Millet (co-founder with the art dealer Daniel Templon, and editor-in-chief) explained why she refused a journalistic approach, too much relying on anecdote; that she no more wanted an avant-garde review that erased art history than she wanted a review on the history of art longing for antiques. Finally, she said, she wanted break the xenophobic habits of French culture.

In her autobiographical novel, La vie sexuelle de Catherine M. ("The sex-life of Catherine M."), Millet explains that setting up the review, and the acquisition of its independent capital, was largely tied to its individual constitution, and she also noted the spirit of free enterprise.

Thirty years later, art press is one of the few influential journals in the French contemporary art market; it can promote, for example, an artist's standing. art press also gives its opinion, supported by references, on wider debates in society.

== art press 2 ==
In May 2006, art press 2 was first published. It was a new collection of three-monthly bilingual themed issues, commenting on news events. Issues of art press 2 have had the themes: La Scène française ("The French scene"), Berlin, ville transit ("Berlin, transit city"), Cynisme et art contemporain ("Cynicism and contemporary art"), Les Nouveaux Réalistes ("The new realists"), Un numéro de choix ("A choice issue"), Londres, nouvelles sensations ("London, new sensations"), Performances contemporaines ("Performance today").

== artpress.com ==
Designed and produced by the editorial team of the art press review, artpress.com is the updated Internet version of the magazine, with a selection of articles, interviews and reports, enriched by unedited content and longer editorials that are not in the paper review.
