= Mylène Bouchard =

Canadian writer

Mylène Bouchard (born 1978) is a Canadian writer from Quebec. She is most noted for her 2017 novel L'Imparfaite Amitié, which was a shortlisted nominee for the Governor General's Award for French-language fiction at the 2017 Governor General's Awards.

She has previously published the novels Ma guerre sera avec toi (2006) and La garçonnière (2009), the short story collection Ciel mon mari (2013), and the non-fiction work Faire l'amour : Shakespeare, Tolstoï et Kundera (2014).
