= Pan Bouyoucas =

Greek-Canadian author, playwright and translator (born 1946)

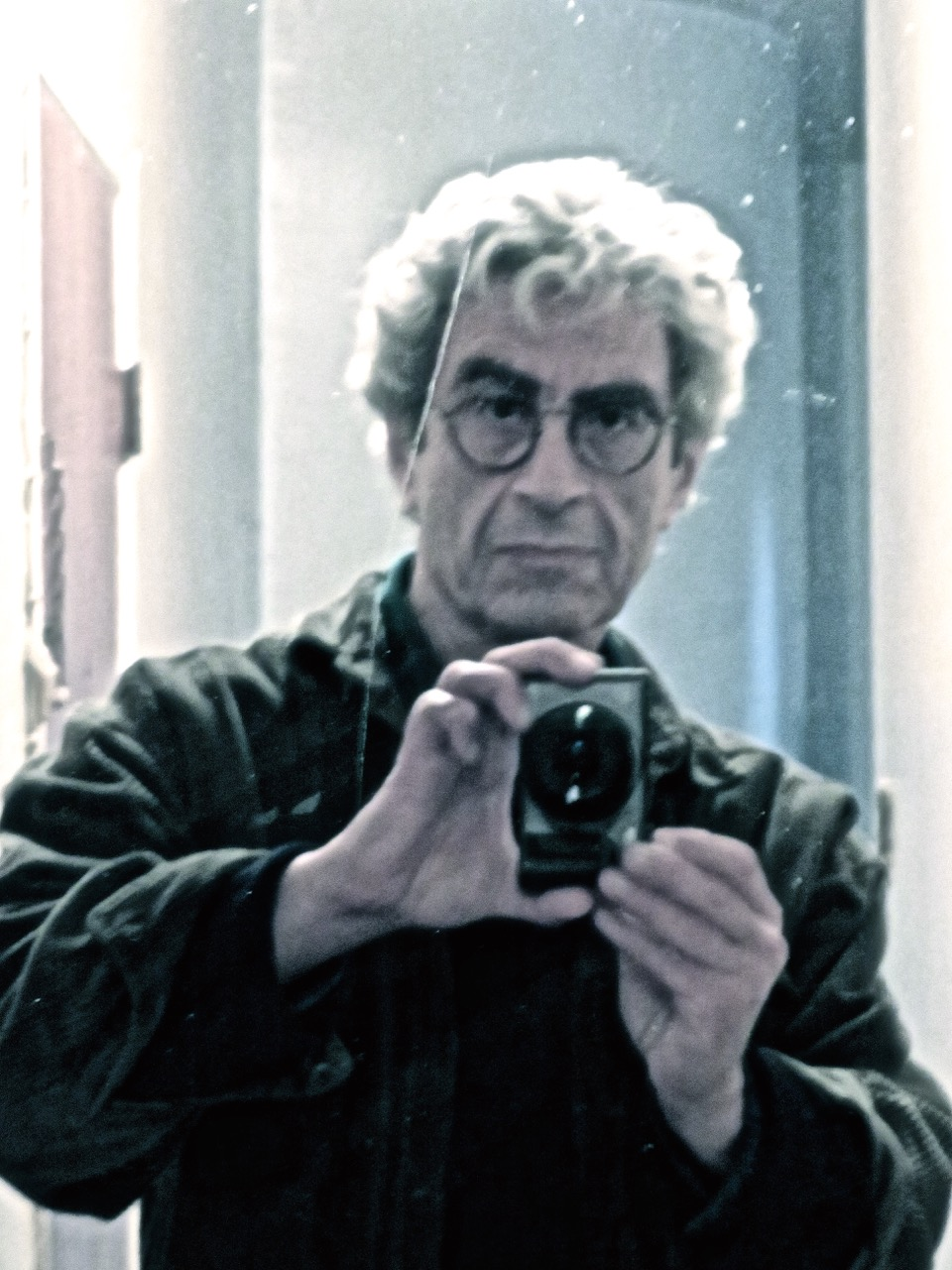
- Born: 16 August 1946 (age 80); Lebanon
- Education: Concordia University (BFA)
- Occupations: Author; playwright; translator

Pan Bouyoucas (born 16 August 1946 in Lebanon) is a Greek-Canadian author, playwright and translator.

== History ==
Bouyoucas was born to Greek parents and emigrated to Canada in 1963. After studies in architecture, in Montreal and New York City, he obtained a BFA (theatre and film) at Concordia University, and worked a few years as a film critic. In the 1970s, he published two novels, then wrote mostly for radio and the theatre, both in French and English. Since 1995, he has published ten novels, a collection of short stories, and a book for children. He has been nominated for several Canadian and international awards and his theatrical plays have been translated and staged in several countries.

According to Kathleen Kellett of Ryerson University and Kirsty Bell of Mount Allison University, the work of Pan Bouyoucas is defined by plurality and diversity: "Cultural diversity, because the author was born in Lebanon and some of his stories evoke the Greek origins of his parents. Linguistic diversity, since Bouyoucas is both a translator and a novelist who publishes in French and sometimes in English. Finally, literary pluralism, since Bouyoucas' work includes novels, novellas, short stories and plays, in which he explores many sub-genres, from magic realism to detective stories. From his first publication, Le dernier souffle (1975), to his most recent, Ce matin sur le toit de l'arc-en-ciel (2017), his output lends itself to analyses of topics of great contemporary relevance: cross-culturality, socio-political critique, issues of language and translation, play with literary genres, family dynamics, magic realism, and the question of origins, among others. Bouyoucas' work travels between Quebec and Greece, probing all the while the issues and challenges of the contemporary world."

In 2025, Pan Bouyoucas was named by his alma mater Great Concordian in recognition of his achievements.

== Novels ==
• Le dernier souffle (Editions du Jour, 1975)

• Une bataille d'Amérique (Editions Quinze, 1976)

• L'humoriste et l'assassin (Libre Expression, 1996 and Club Québec-Loisirs, 1997)

• La vengeance d'un père (Libre Expression, 1997, Guernica Editions, 2001, as A Father's Revenge), shortlisted for the Prix Ringuet de l'Académie des lettres du Québec

• L'autre (Les Allusifs, 2001), translated by Sheila Fischman as The Other in Aegean Tales(Cormorant, 2008), Finalist, the Governor General's Literary Awards and the Prix Marcel-Couture du Salon du Livre de Montréal

• Anna Pourquoi (Les Allusifs, 2004) translated by Sheila Fischman as Anna Why in Aegean Tales(Cormorant, 2008), winner of the Prix littéraire des collégiens and Le livre élu (France)

• The Man Who Wanted to Drink Up the Sea (Cormorant, 2006), cited by France's FNAC as one of the best novels of the year

• Portrait d'un mari avec les cendres de sa femme (Les Allusifs, 2010), translated by Sheila Fischman as Portrait of a Husband with the Ashes of His Wife (Guernica Editions, 2018)

• Cocorico (XYZ, 2011), translated by Maureen Labonté as "Cock-A-Doodle-Doo" (Guernica Editions, 2022)

• The Tattoo (Cormorant, 2011, XYZ), nominated for the Re-Lit Award

• Ari et la reine de l'orge (Les Allusifs, 2014), translated by Sheila Fischman as Ari and the Barley Queen (Guernica Editions, 2023)

• Le mauvais œil (Les Allusifs, 2015)

• Ce matin, sur le toit de l'arc-en-ciel (Les Allusifs, 2017)

== Short stories ==
- Docteur Loukoum (Editions Trait d'union, 2000)
- Gandhi's Admirer (translation by Paul Curtis Daw of L'admirateur de Gandhi for Words without Borders, 2011)

== Children's books ==
- Thésée et le Minotaure (Editions 400 coups, 2003) Finalist, The Governor General's Literary Awards

== Theatre ==
• Le pourboire (1983), First prize, Concours Radiophonique de Radio-Canada and Concours de la Communauté radiophonique des programmes de langue française, Paris.

• Kill the Music (1986), Screener's Award, Quebec Drama Festival

• From the Main to Mainstreet (1988), renamed Divided We Stand (1991), Canadian Stage's biggest box-office success and Toronto's 1991 biggest hit

• Three Cops on a Roof (1990)

• Le Cerf-volant (1992, Editions Trait d'union, 2000, The Paper Eagle, Playwrights Canada Press, 2006)

• Lionel (1994, Dramaturges Editeurs, 2011), Prix TNM du théâtre épique, shortlisted for the Herman Voaden National Playwriting Award

• Nocturne (1995, Dramaturges Editeurs, 1998)

• Hypatie (1997, Dramaturges Editeurs, 2005), Lauréat des Journées d'auteurs, Théâtre des Célestins, Lyon, France

• Un petit mensonge innocent (2021, Centre des auteurs dramatiques (CEAD))

• Le meilleur quartier du monde (2022, Centre des auteurs dramatiques (CEAD))

• Le redresseur de torts (2024, Centre des auteurs dramatiques (CEAD))

== Translations ==
Bouyoucas has translated fifteen books from English to French, including:

• Ombre de Maggie (Jackrabbit Moon) by Sheila McLeod Arnopoulos, Libre Expression, 2000, Quebec Writers' Federation Prize for translation 2002
