= Sugaring Off (Britt novel) =

2020 novel by Fanny Britt

- Author: Fanny Britt
- Translator: Susan Ouriou
- Publisher: Book*hug Press
- Publication date: 2020
- Pages: 228
- ISBN: 9781771669085

Sugaring Off is a 2020 novel by Canadian writer Fanny Britt. The book was published in French and translated into English by Susan Ouriou in 2024.

== Reception ==
Ashley Fish-Robertson praised it in a review for the Montreal Review of Books. Alison Manley in the Seaboard Review, wrote that it "asks several pointed questions about grief, family, and who gets to have space to mourn."

Emily Latimer praised the book in the Literary Review of Canada.

Michelle Hardy, in a review for PRISM International, wrote that "Britt’s characters are far from one-dimensional. I toss between waves of criticism and empathy for these richly complicated people. As the timeline shifts, the same episodes are presented from alternate points of view. Characters’ appearances and personalities differ when depicted by the narrator or seen through another character’s eyes."

The book was longlisted for the Giller Prize. It won the 2021 Governor General's Award for French-language fiction.
