= Yves Préfontaine =

Canadian writer (1937–2019)

Yves Préfontaine (1 February 1937 in Montreal, Quebec – 31 March 2019) was a Canadian writer based in Quebec.

== Books ==
- Boreal (1967)
- Les Temples effondres (1957)
- La Poesie et nous (1958)
- L'Antre du poeme (1960)
- Pays sans parole (1967)
- Debacle suivi de A l'oree des travaux (1970)
- Nuaison (1981)

== Honours ==
- 1968 – Prix Jean-Hamelin, The wordless
- 1990 – Prix Québec-Paris, Word required, poems 1954–1985
- 2000 – Félix-Antoine Savard
