= Marie-Pascale Huglo =

French-born Canadian writer and educator

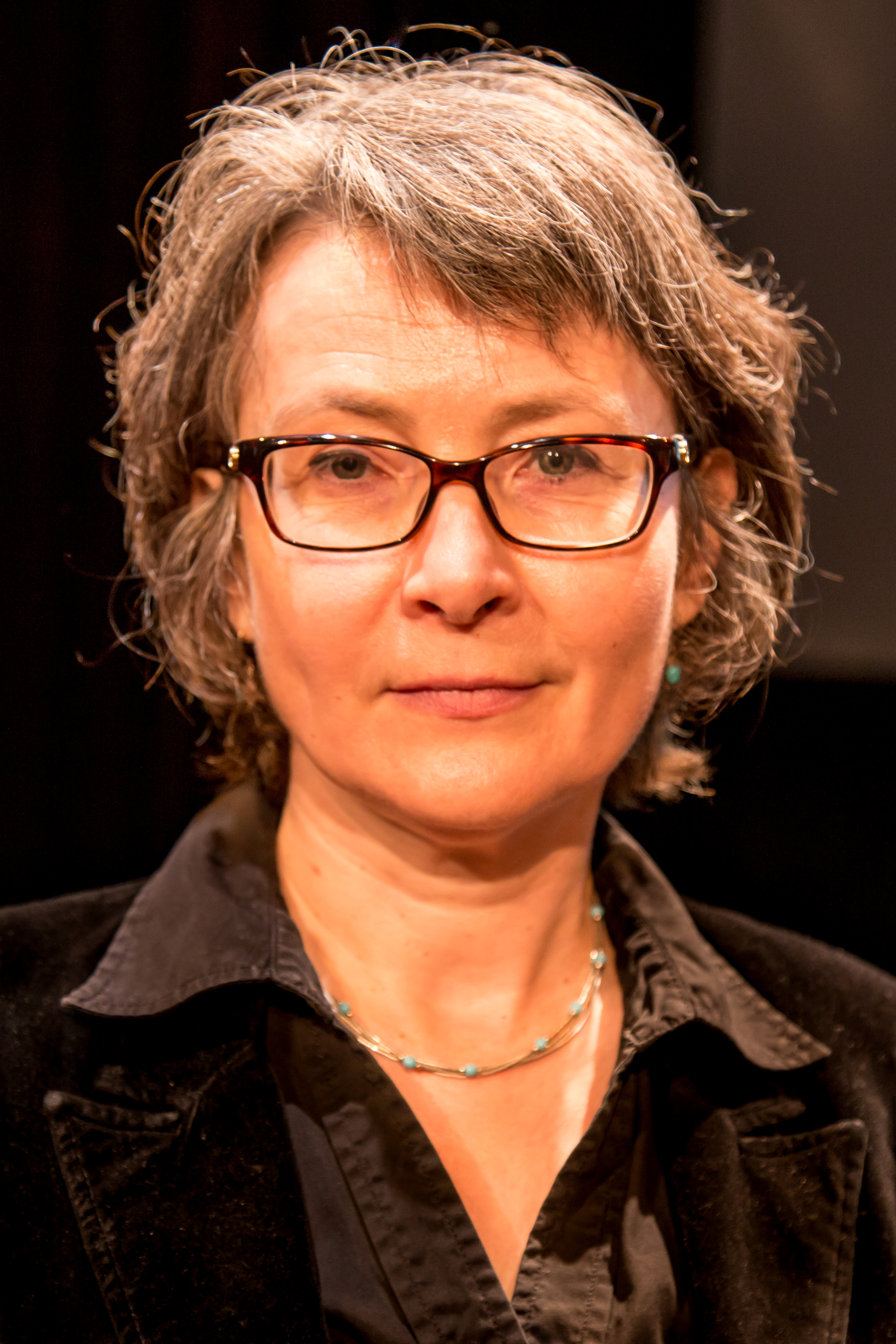
- Born: March 20, 1961 (age 65); Amiens, France

Marie-Pascale Huglo (born March 20, 1961) is a French-born writer and educator living in Quebec.

== Biography ==
She was born in Amiens. She studied modern literature and English studies at the University of Sorbonne Nouvelle Paris 3. She moved to Montreal in 1983. She pursued studies in comparative literature at the Université de Montréal, receiving a doctorate in 1983. She teaches at the Université de Montréal, where she is a professor in the department of French language literature, and at the Université du Québec à Montréal.

Her essay Métamorphoses de l'insignifiant. Essai sur l'anecdote dans la modernité was a finalist for the Prix Raymond-Klibansky.

== Selected works ==
- La respiration du monde, novel (2010), finalist for the Prix littéraire des collégiens and the Prix Ringuet
- La Fille d'Ulysse, novel (2015)
- Montréal-Mirabel, lignes de séparation, finalist for the Grand prix du livre de Montréal
