= Chasse à l'homme =

Novel by Sophie Létourneau

- Récit
- Author: Sophie Létourneau
- Language: French
- Genres: Fiction
- Published: 2020
- Publisher: La Peuplade, CA
- Publication place: Canada
- Media type: Print (paperback), ebook
- Pages: 216
- Award: Governor General’s Literary Award
- ISBN: 9782924898550

Chasse à l'homme is a novel written by Canadian author Sophie Létourneau, published in 2020 by La Peuplade. It won the 2020 Governor General's Literary Award for French-language fiction.

== Backstory ==
After completing her studies in literature, Létourneau consulted a psychic who would reveal to her, the man in her life. Deciding not to wait, she pursued him for six years and then took another six years to write about her hunt for the man, which is in French, the title of her novel, Chasse à l'homme.

== Synopsis ==
Chasse à l'homme is a collection of anecdotes, thoughts and quotes in which Sophie Létourneau consults a fortune teller who predicts that she would find the love of her life thanks to a book.

== Awards ==
Chasse à l'homme won the 2020 Governor General's Award for French-language fiction at the 2020 Governor General's Awards, and was shortlisted for the 2021 Prix littéraire des collégiens.

== Reception ==
The novel was generally well received in Létourneau's home province of Quebec. Sarah-Émilie Nault of Le Journal de Montréal writes "Chasse à l'homme offers a reflection on writing as beautiful as the memories that we manage to build for ourselves." La Presse columnists Chantal Guy and Marc Cassivi classified the book as "their most beautiful literary discoveries of 2020", and described it as "a sparkling reflection of intelligence on the place of women in literature.”
