= Christian Guay-Poliquin =

Canadian novelist from Quebec (born 1982)

- Born: December 7, 1982; Saint-Armand
- Occupations: Author, Novelist
- Writing career
- Language: French
- Notable works: Le fil des kilomètres; Le poids de la neige
- Literary movement: CanLit
- Website: christianguaypoliquin.com

Christian Guay-Poliquin (born 1982) is a Canadian novelist from Quebec. His second novel, Le Poids de la neige, won the Governor General's Award for French-language fiction at the 2017 Governor General's Awards. Guay-Poliquin was born in Saint-Armand, Quebec.

The novel also won the 2017 Prix littéraire des collégiens, and the 2017 Prix France-Québec.

== Works ==
- Le fil des kilomètres (2013)
  - transl. Jacob Homel: Running on Fumes Talonbooks, Vancouver 2016
- (fr) Le poids de la neige La Peuplade, Saguenay 2016 (ISBN 9782924519295) 312 pp
  - Le poids de la neige. Les éd. de l'observatoire, Paris 2017 (ISBN 9791032902134) 256 pp (new version, generated by the author)
  - (it) Il peso della neve. Marsilio, Venezia 2018
  - (angl.) transl. Jacob Homel: The weight of snow. Talonbooks, Vancouver 2019 ("certain changes to his novel", p. 2 = Parisian version)
- (fr) Les ombres filantes La Peuplade, Saguenay 2021 (ISBN 9782925141006) 344 pp
