= Marie-Pier Lafontaine =

Canadian writer

Marie-Pier Lafontaine is a Canadian writer. She is most noted for her 2019 novel Chienne, which was a shortlisted finalist for the Governor General's Award for French-language fiction at the 2020 Governor General's Awards.

The novel also won the French Prix Sade in 2020.
