= Emmanuelle Pierrot =

Canadian writer (born 1994)

Emmanuelle Pierrot (born 1994) is a Canadian writer from Montreal, Quebec, whose debut novel La version qui n'intéresse personne was published in 2023.

The novel, based in part on Pierrot's own experiences living in Dawson City, Yukon, in the early 2010s, was the winner of the 2024 Prix littéraire des collégiens and the 2024 edition of Le Combat des livres, and was shortlisted for the Governor General's Award for French-language fiction at the 2024 Governor General's Awards. It has also been optioned by Couronne Nord for adaptation as a feature film, slated to be directed by Myriam Verreault.
