= The Sluts =

2004 novel

- Author: Dennis Cooper
- Language: English
- Publication date: 2004

The Sluts is a 2004 epistolary novel by American author Dennis Cooper. The novel is composed of posts on internet forums, transcriptions of tape recordings, and private emails. The focus is on Brad, a gay male sex worker, and others' attempts to ascertain his identity. Throughout the novel, characters relate stories of sexual and physical violence they have perpetrated or wish to perpetrate against Brad, though the veracity of their claims and of Brad's identity are disputed.

The novel won the Lambda Literary Award in 2005 and the Sade Prize in 2007.

== Background and publication ==
Dennis Cooper is an American author whose work is largely centered on fantastical elements, sexual violence, and transgression. The violence endemic to his writing has had mixed reception; while literary critic Leora Lev praised it.

Written during the publication of the five novels in his George Miles cycle (including Frisk), The Sluts was published in 2004.

== Contents ==
In the summer of 2001, several members of a forum review Brad, a hustler living in Long Beach, California. The reviews characterize Brad inconsistently; his height, eye color, and circumcision status are described differently in each review. His age is also unclear, with reviewers suggesting he is as young as thirteen. The reviews acknowledge Brad's erratic personality, which they theorize is caused by drug use or schizophrenia. One reviewer, Brian, suspects that Brad's behavior may be caused by an undiagnosed brain tumor, leading him to seek Brad out in order to provide him medical and financial assistance. Brian claims that Brad has moved into his apartment after his cancer diagnosis is confirmed. He includes contact information for potential clients to hire Brad as an escort, and announces his ultimate wish: to murder Brad while engaging in intercourse with him. The members of the forum become obsessed with the "Brad saga" and attempt to ascertain his identity, discovering that there may be several "Brads". The site administrator closes the thread following the murder of a terminally-ill sex worker who claimed to know the "real Brad".

Some time later, on another forum, a user describes how they met "Brad" as a hitchhiker on his way to Portland, Oregon. A purported journalist asks for information to support an article he is writing for The Advocate. Other users contribute with their own reports and discover that Brad was arrested for arson in Portland, that he has been sent to prison and has a pregnant girlfriend named Elaine. Elaine soon posts on the forum herself, offering to send questions for Brad to answer in exchange for money. This is soon revealed to be a scam. "Brian" returns to denounce Brad as a manipulative schemer; the victim of his arson charge comes to his defense. Brad is released from prison early, and the journalist is revealed to be Zack Young - not a journalist, but a former IBM website creator fascinated by sado-masochism and snuff.

In a series of emails and faxes, a released "Brad" begs "Brian" to take him back and to send him a bus ticket from Oregon to California. "Brian" eventually discloses that he has been scamming "Brad"; he is, in fact, Zack Young. "Brad" declares that he never cared about Brian. On the original review site, members discover that "Brad" has returned to California where he is living with "Brian" – a ruse by which the pair hope to make money by playing into the celebrity culture that surrounds the saga.

On the forum, "Brian" returns to advertising Brad's services as an escort, inviting clients to indulge their fantasies of BDSM, cock and ball torture, and other forms of physical abuse. The reviews escalate as a client describes how he broke Brad's legs and ankles, and a doctor recounts his experience of castrating "Brad" while he was still wearing casts. Members of the forum relate their fantasies of bugchasing and pedophilia while others try to raise funds to rescue "Brad" from his abuse. After several dissatisfied reviews from clients, who find that Brad's reputed good looks have faded due to his prolonged abuse, "Brian" announces that "Brad" can be dismembered and murdered by the highest bidder. The legitimate Brad, still living in Portland, posts to dispute the reviews. Brad confirms that he and Elaine are married and have a child. It becomes clear that "Brad" is, in fact, an imposter named Thad, also from Oregon and diagnosed with terminal leukemia. Zack is infuriated by Thad's deceit and expedites his established plan to charge a client to murder him.

A final anonymous reviewer, a man who despises sex workers, describes how he agreed to rape and murder Thad. He then shot Zack and framed his death as a suicide to avoid being caught by police. The site administrator uploads the review on police recommendation, urging anybody with information as to the reviewer's identity to go to the police.

Zack, in a private email to the site administrator, leaves a farewell message explaining that the final reviews were a ruse. After Thad's true identity was revealed, clients lost interest. Thad, Zack claims, escaped from the apartment, suggesting that Zack's death was a suicide after all.

== Reception ==
The novel won the Lambda Literary Award and Sade Prize in 2005 and 2007, respectively.

Sociologist Jaime García-Iglesias writes that The Sluts is indicative of the internet changing how sexual fantasies are portrayed and realized. García-Iglesias also writes that The Sluts presents an accurate view on internet culture – specifically that its reliability is questionable – that he uses in digital ethnographic work. Scholar Kent L. Brintnall similarly writes, using the theory of desire in Georges Bataille's publications, that the novel plays with desire, fantasy, and mystery; for Brintnall and Bataille, desire is a product of attempting to understand others, and The Sluts evokes this concept. Porn studies researcher Steven Ruszczycky argues that the novel was representative of a shift in gay sexual culture from the twentieth to the twenty-first centuries: The widespread availability of pre-exposure prophylaxis to prevent HIV/AIDS infection allowed for gay sexual desire to move away from safe to unsafe sexual practices.

Queer theory scholars Stephen M. Engel and Timothy S. Lyle write that the novel authentically portrays sexual desire, particularly in the sexual subcommunities it represents.
