= Benjamin Hertwig =

Canadian poet

- Occupations: Poet, novelist, bookseller
- Writing career
- Genres: Poetry, fiction, non-fiction
- Notable works: Slow War, Juiceboxers
- Notable awards: National Magazine Award for Personal Journalism (2017)

Benjamin Hertwig is a Canadian poet, whose debut poetry collection Slow War was a shortlisted finalist for the Governor General's Award for English-language poetry at the 2017 Governor General's Awards. He is based in Edmonton, Alberta, and is co-owner of the used bookstore Paper Birch Books.

A former member of the Canadian Armed Forces who served in Afghanistan, he has also published short fiction and non-fiction work in Maisonneuve, Canadian Literature, The Walrus, Ricepaper, Geez, Prairie Fire, Pleiades, and The New York Times. He won a National Magazine Award in the Personal Journalism category in 2017 for "The Burn".

In 2024, Hertwig released his first novel, Juiceboxers, which follows four young men sent to war in Afghanistan. The novel was a finalist for the 2025 Amazon.ca First Novel Award.
