= Jean-François Caron (writer) =

Canadian writer

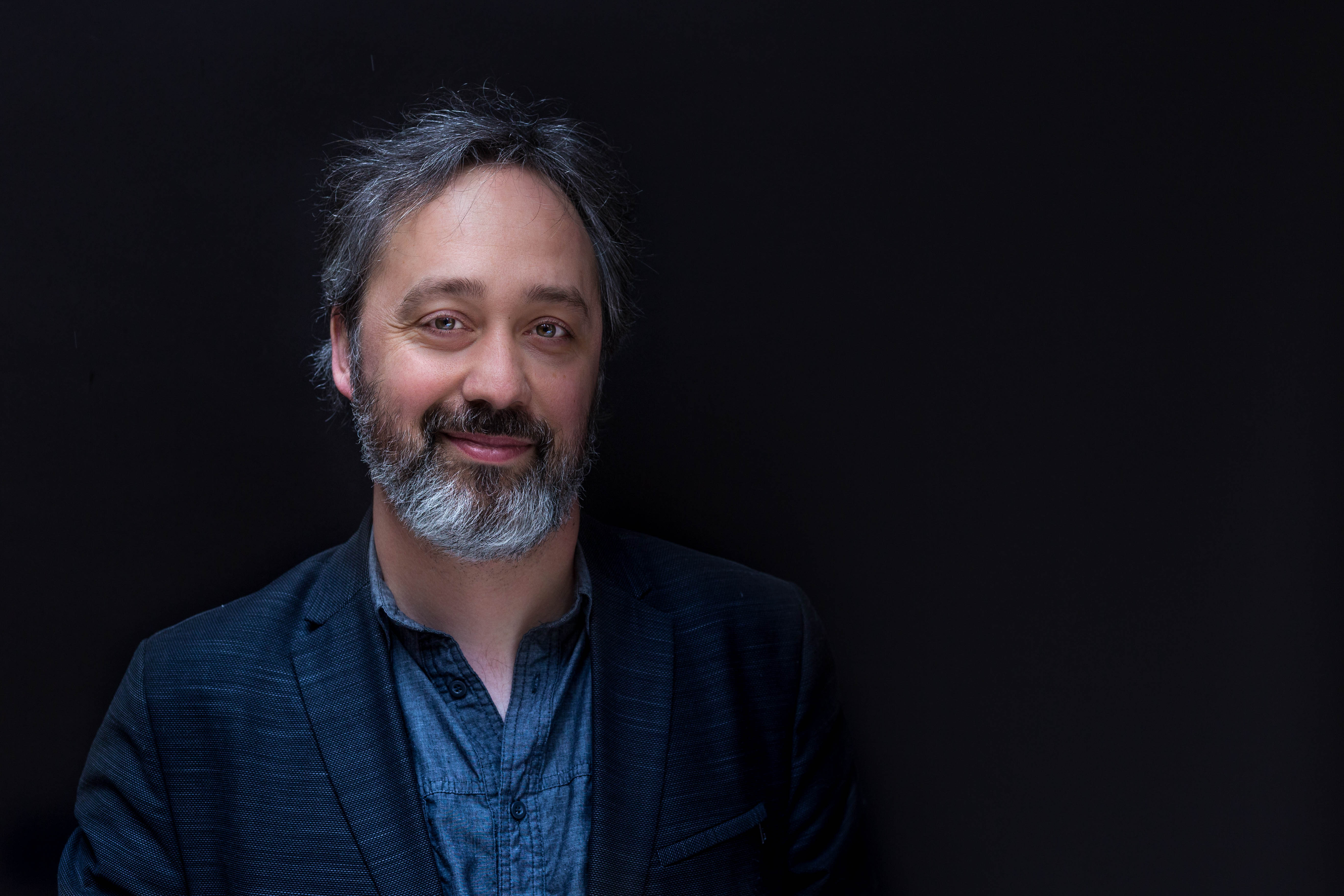
- Born: February 19, 1978 (age 48); La Pocatière, Quebec, Canada

Jean-François Caron (born February 19, 1978) is a Canadian writer from Quebec, most noted for his 2017 novel De bois debout.

A graduate of the Université du Québec à Chicoutimi, he is a former editor of the Saguenay-Alma edition of Voir. De bois debout, his third novel, was a finalist for the Prix littéraire des collégiens, the Prix des libraires du Québec, and the Prix France-Québec, in 2018.

== Works ==
=== Novels ===
- Nos échoueries, 2010 ISBN 978-2-923530-15-4
- Rose Brouillard, le film, 2012 ISBN 978-2-923530-42-0
- De bois debout, 2017 ISBN 978-2-924519-43-1
- Beau Diable, 2022 ISBN 978-2-7609-4900-3

=== Poetry ===
- Des champs de mandragores, 2006 ISBN 978-2-923530-03-1
- Vers-hurlements et barreaux de lit, 2010 ISBN 978-2-895832-25-6
