= Annie Lafleur =

Canadian poet from Quebec (born 1980)

Annie Lafleur (born 1980 in Montreal) is a Canadian poet from Quebec. She is most noted for her poetry collection Bec-de-lièvre, which was a shortlisted finalist for the Governor General's Award for French-language poetry at the 2017 Governor General's Awards.

Her other poetry collections have included Prolégomènes à mon géant (2007), Handkerchief (2009), Rosebud (2013) and Nouvelles vagues (2014).
