= Michel Jean =

Canadian television journalist

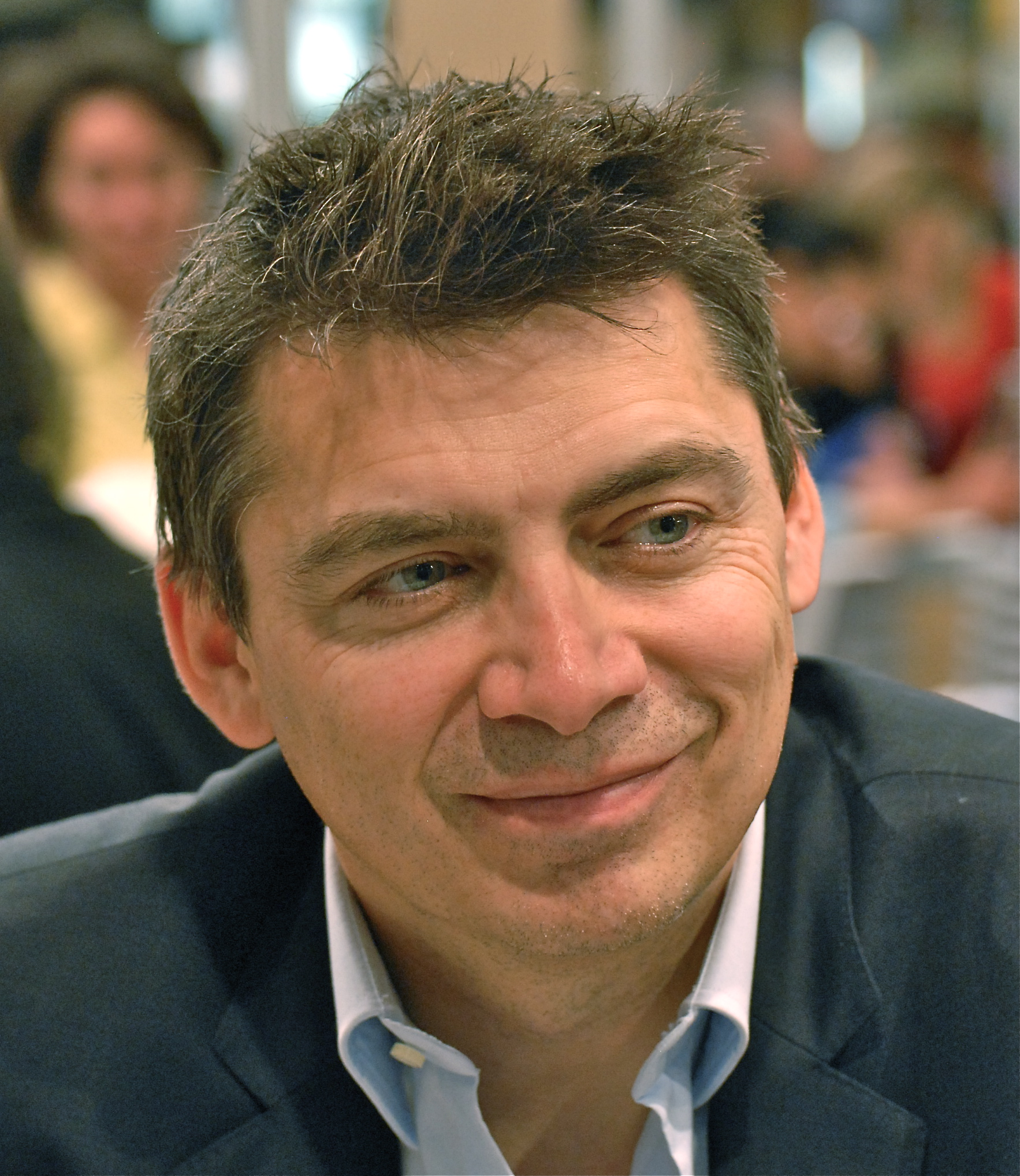
- Born: Alma, Quebec, Canada
- Occupations: Journalist; novelist
- Writing career
- Language: French
- Notable work: kukum

Michel Jean is a Canadian television journalist and author. He was the weekend anchor of TVA Nouvelles until retiring from TVA in 2024, and was formerly an anchor on TVA's news magazine JE and for the 24-hour news channel RDI.

In addition to his journalism career, Jean has published several novels, including Envoyé spécial (2008), Un monde mort comme la lune (2009), Une vie à aimer (2010), Elle et nous (2012), Le vent en parle encore (2013), La belle mélancolie (2015), Tsunamis (2017), Kukum (2019), Tiohtiá:ke (2021), and Qimmik (2023).

Kukum, a novel based on the life of his own Innu great-grandmother Almanda Siméon, won the Prix France-Québec in 2020, and was selected for the 2021 edition of Le Combat des livres, where it was defended by Indigenous activist Michèle Audette. The novel won the competition on May 7, 2021. Following his success with Kukum, his earlier novel Elle et nous was reissued in 2021 under the new title Atuk.

Susan Ouriou received a nomination for the Governor General's Award for French to English translation at the 2023 Governor General's Awards for her translation of Kukum.

Kukum was also longlisted for the Dublin Literary Award in 2025.
