= Les marins ne savent pas nager =

2022 novel

First edition cover

Les marins ne savent pas nager is a 2022 novel by Canadian writer Dominique Scali.

== Summary ==
On the isolated island of Ys in the mid-Atlantic in an alternative 18th Century, the novel follows the life of an orphan named Danaé Poussin, who is one of the few who know how to swim.

== Themes ==
In an interview with Le Devoir, Scali stated that she had been inspired by Hans Christian Andersen's The Little Mermaid, saying that it was about "the sacrifices which we're willing to make for love and for success." In the same interview, Scali further stated that the novel had been inspired by the works of Roger Vercel and Victor Hugo, and that the duality between opposites happening at the same time was a central theme.

== Reception ==
Yassi Nasseri of Kimamori called the novel "a marvel" that was "universal in its exploration of humanity and the fluctuating paradoxes of humanity." Julie Roy of L'actualité praised the world-building of the novel, stating that "the island of Ys does not exist, but the novel evokes it with such power that we immediately begin believing in it."
