= Francine D'Amour =

Canadian writer and novelist (born 1946)

Francine D'Amour (born November 6, 1946) is a Quebec educator and writer.

The daughter of Jean D'Amour and Marthe Pinard, she was born in Beauharnois and studied modern literature at the Université de Nice and French literature at the University of Ottawa. D'Amour has taught at a number of CEGEPs in Quebec, including the Collège Montmorency in Laval.

She published her first novel Les Dimanches sont mortels in 1987; it received the Grand Prix littéraire Guérin and the Prix de l'Académie des lettres du Québec. Her second novel Les Jardins de l'enfer was a finalist for the prize awarded by the readers of Elle (France). D'Amour has contributed to several literary journals such as Arcade, Les écrits, Le Sabord and Moebius.

D'Amour has been invited to various literary festivals, book fairs and literary conferences in Canada, the United States, France and Morocco.

== Selected works ==
- Écrire comme un chat, stories (1994)
- Presque rien, novel (1996), received the Prix Québec-Paris
- Le retour d'Afrique, novel (2004), finalist for the Prix littéraire des collégiens, the Prix des libraires du Québec and the Prix du roman d'amour du Prince-Maurice; translated into English by Wayne Grady as Return from Africa (2005)
