= Michèle Plomer =

Canadian writer and translator (born 1965)

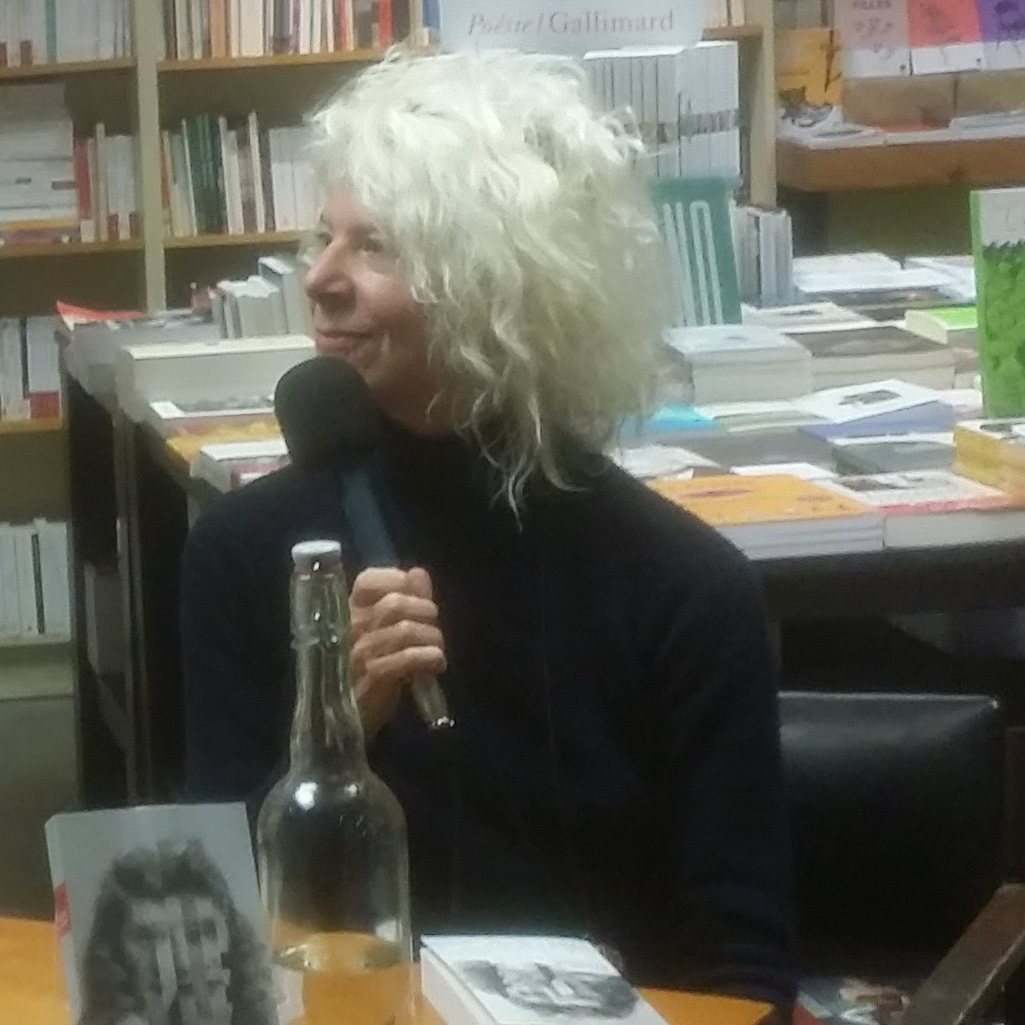
- Born: 1965 (age 60–61); Montreal, Quebec, Canada
- Occupations: writer; translator
- Writing career
- Genres: novels; children's literature; essays
- Notable awards: 2007, Prix Alfred Desrochers; 2010, Prix France-Québec

Michèle Plomer (born 1965, Montreal, Quebec) is a Canadian writer and translator. She is a recipient of the fr:Prix Alfred Desrochers and the Prix France-Québec.

== Biography ==
Her writing demonstrates her love of the Eastern Townships, where she lives, and her time in south China, where she taught English for three years at Shenzhen University. She was included in a list of authors of avant-garde Quebec novels. She participated in the 2014 and 2017 editions of the Les Correspondances d'Eastman literary festival. Plomer was a finalist for the 2017 Prix des libraires. She is also co-publisher of the Magog publishing house, Chauve-souris.

== Awards and honours ==
- 2007, Prix Alfred Desrochers
- 2010, Prix France-Québec

== Selected works ==
=== Novels ===
- 2007, Le jardin sablier ISBN 9782922944327
- 1020, HKPQ ISBN 9782922944518
- 2011, Dragonville, vol. 1 : Porcelaine ISBN 9782922944723
- 2012, Dragonville, vol. 2 : Encre ISBN 9782923896090
- 2013, Dragonville, vol. 3 : Empois ISBN 9782923896236
- 2016, Étincelle ISBN 9782923896618
- 2018, La petite voleuse de perles ISBN 9791094689110
- 2019, Habiller le cœur ISBN 9782923896960

=== Children's literature ===
- 2015, Sueurs froides ISBN 9782981555878
- 2021, À l'eau ISBN 9782981913005

=== Short stories ===
- 2018, "Moucheuse", in Treize à table, edited by Chrystine Brouillet and Geneviève Lefebvre ISBN 9782897114114

=== Translation ===
- 2017, Les gens de Shenzhen, by Xue Yiwei ISBN 9782923896786

=== Essays ===
- 2022, À nos filles, Michèle Plomer and Justine Latour ISBN 9782925059189
