= Marie-Christine Bernard =

Canadian educator and writer

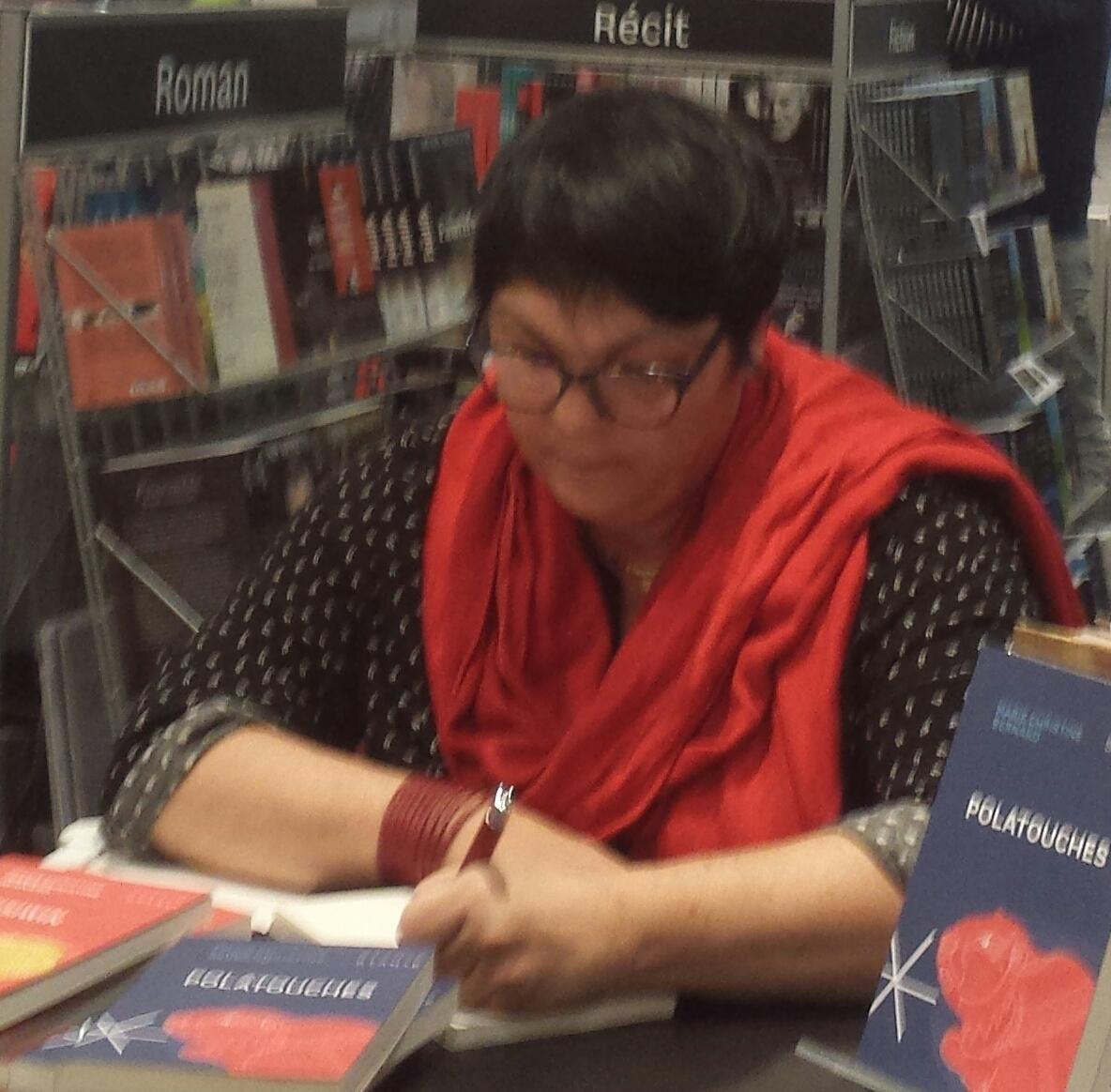
Marie-Christine Bernard in 2018

Marie-Christine Bernard (born 1966) is a Canadian educator and award-winning writer living in Quebec.

She was born in Carleton-sur-Mer and received a bachelor's degree and then a master's degree in literary studies from the Université Laval. Bernard has taught at the Collège d'Alma since 1994; she teaches literature, creative writing, film analysis and ethnology. From 2006 to 2010, she hosted the program "Beau temps, mauvais temps" on Ici Radio-Canada Première Saguenay. She also contributes to a number of literary journals, including Zone occupée and to the webzine Mauvaise Herbe.

In 2016, she represented Quebec at the Semaine de la langue française et de la Francophonie, held in Mexico.

== Selected works ==
- Monsieur Julot (2005), novel, received the Prix découverte Abitibi-Consolidated
- La confiture de rêves (2007), youth novel, received the Prix Jovette-Bernier
- Le prince Malavenant (2008), youth novel
- Mademoiselle Personne (2008), novel, received the Prix France-Québec ant the Prix du roman Abitibi-Bowater
- Sombre peuple (2010), short stories
