= Jean-Paul Pinsonneault =

Canadian writer (1923–1978)

Jean-Paul Pinsonneault (1923–1978) was a Canadian writer who won the Prix Québec-Paris and the Governor General's Award for French-language fiction in 1964 for his novel Les terres sèches. He also published the plays Cette terre de faim, Electre and Terre d'aube, and the novels Jérôme Aquin, Le mauvais pain and Les abîmes de l'aube.

Les terres sèches was one of the first novels in Quebec history to directly address LGBT themes.

He was also the publisher of Éditions Fides, as well as a magazine editor.
