= Ève Lambert =

Canadian writer from Quebec (born 1992)

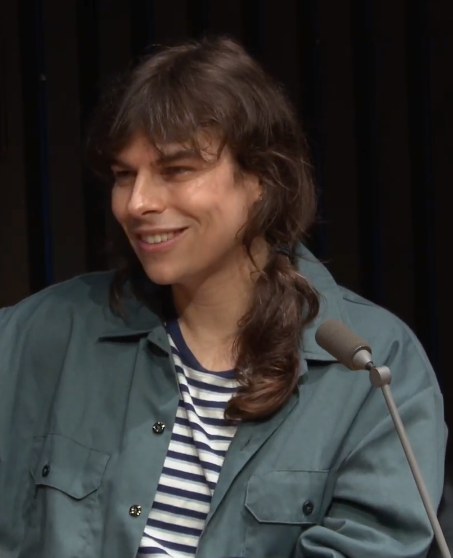
- In a 2024 interview
- Born: 1992 (age 33–34); Chicoutimi, Quebec, Canada
- Education: Université de Montréal
- Occupation: Writer
- Writing career
- Language: French
- Years active: 2010s–present
- Notable works: Tu aimeras ce que tu as tué, Querelle de Roberval, Que notre joie demeure

Ève Lambert (née Kevin Lambert; born 1992) is a Canadian writer from Quebec. She is most noted for her novel Que notre joie demeure, which won the Prix Médicis in 2023.

== Biography ==
Originally from the Chicoutimi borough of Saguenay, Quebec, Lambert moved to Montreal in her late teens to study literature at the Université de Montréal. She published her debut novel Tu aimeras ce que tu as tué in 2017, and followed up with Querelle de Roberval in 2018. In addition to the Prix Ringuet, Querelle de Roberval won the Prix Sade and the Prix Œuvre de la relève à Montréal, and was shortlisted for the Prix littéraire des collégiens.

Biblioasis has published English translations of both novels, with You Will Love What You Have Killed published in 2020, and Querelle of Roberval released in 2022. The translated version of Querelle of Roberval was a finalist for the 2022 Atwood Gibson Writers' Trust Fiction Prize, and won the 2023 ReLit Award for fiction.

Before transitioning, Lambert was a gay man. Querelle de Roberval is partially based on Jean Genet's 1947 novel Querelle of Brest (Querelle de Brest). Later, she underwent "a long and uncertain exit from gender, an infinite withdrawal, a studious disassociation from the categories of woman or man."

She published her third novel and the first under the name Kev Lambert, Que notre joie demeure, in 2022. The novel was named to the initial longlist for the 2023 Prix Goncourt. Following the nomination, the novel sparked some controversy in France because Lambert was open about having had the novel vetted by a sensitivity reader prior to publication as it featured a key character of Haitian descent, with previous Goncourt winner Nicolas Mathieu criticizing the practice as stifling to a writer's creative liberty. The novel was subsequently named the winner of the Prix Médicis and the Prix Ringuet.

May Our Joy Endure, an English translation of Que notre joie demeure, was published in fall 2024, around the same time as the publication of Lambert's fourth novel Les Sentiers de neige.
