= Ying Chen =

Chinese Canadian author (born 1961)

- 应晨; Yìng Chén
- Born: February 20, 1961 (age 65); Shanghai, China
- Education: Fudan University; McGill University
- Occupation: Writer
- Notable work: L'ingratitude (1995); Immobile (1998)
- Awards: Prix Québec-Paris (1995); Prix Ringuet (2021)

Ying Chen (Chinese: 应晨; pinyin: Yìng Chén; born February 20, 1961) is a Chinese Canadian author. She writes primarily in French and has translated a few of her own works into Chinese and English. Her 1995 book L'ingratitude received a Prix Québec-Paris.

== Biography ==
Chen was born in 1961 in Shanghai to an engineer father. She grew up during the Great Leap Forward and the Cultural Revolution, finishing secondary school just two years after entrance exams were reinstated in 1977. She initially wanted to study Chinese literature, but decided to read Modern Languages instead, where she was admitted due in part to her superior marks in Russian. From there, she chose to pursue French over the other two options, English or Japanese. She obtained a degree in French language and literature from Fudan University in 1983 and spent six years working as a translator in Mandarin, Italian, English, and French at the Institute of Astronautical Research in Shanghai.

In 1989, Chen left China and moved to Montréal to earn a Master's degree in creative writing at McGill University. Not long after she left China, students were massacred in Tiananmen Square, which made her anxious and homesick. She later compared her migration to Canada to "a form of suicide". She completed her degree in 1991, fulfilling her thesis requirements in two parts: a critical study of Les Dieux ont soif, and an original work, Fleurs de lotus, which became the beginning of her first novel, La Mémoire de l'eau, which she published the following year. Chen and her family lived in Magog, Quebec in the late 1990s and early 2000s before relocating to Vancouver in 2003 to be closer to her husband's job. In 2009, she was a Shadbolt Fellow at Simon Fraser University, which has since named two scholarships in her honor.

Ying Chen's novels include La mémoire de l'eau (1992), Les lettres chinoises (1993; nine editions by 2016), and L'ingratitude (1995). L'ingratitude won the Prix Québec-Paris in 1995 and was translated into English by Carol Volk through Farrar, Straus and Giroux in 1998. Chen also translated it into Chinese and it was released under the name 再见妈妈 in 2002. It has since been translated into Italian, English, Spanish, and Serbian. Her next book, Immobile (1998), won the Prix Alfred-DesRochers.

She self-translated Le champ dans la mer (2002) into Chinese as V家花园 (2016) and Querelle d'un squelette avec son double (2003) into English as Skeleton and its double (2016). Other books include Le Mangeur (2006), Un enfant à ma porte (2008), Espèces (2010), and La Rive est loin (2012). She also has two books of essays, Quatre mille marches: un rêve chinois (2004) and La lenteur des montagnes (2014), and has published poetry in French and Mandarin. In 2001, she served as a judge on the panel for the 2001 Governor General's Award for French-language fiction.

== Personal life ==
Chen and her husband have two sons, Yuan (born 1996) and Lee (born 1998). When she became a Canadian national, she "yielded to North American practice, putting family name last." This, in effect, turned her birth name into a nom de plume.

== Selected works ==
- La Mémoire de l'eau. Montréal: Leméac. 1992. ISBN 978-276-093-145-9.
- Les Lettres chinoises. Montréal: Lemeac. 1993. ISBN 978-276-093-157-2.
- L'ingratitude. Montréal: Leméac. 1995. ISBN 978-276-091-518-3.
- Les Lettres chinoises (Second ed.). Arles, France: Actes Sud. 1998. ISBN 978-2-7427-1955-6.
- Immobile. Montréal: Boréal. 1998. ISBN 978-289-052-929-8.
- Le champ dans la mer. Montréal: Boréal. 2002. ISBN 978-276-460-127-3.
- "On the Verge of Disappearance (End of the Chinese Letters)". Passages: welcome home to Canada. Toronto: Doubleday Canada. 2002. ISBN 978-038-565-893-5. (Anthology).
- Querelle d'un squelette avec son double. Montréal: Boréal. 2003. ISBN 978-276-460-238-6.
- Quatre mille marches: un rêve chinois. Paris: Éditions du Seuil. 2004. ISBN 978-202-065-379-4.
- Le mangeur. Montréal: Boréal. 2006. ISBN 978-276-460-432-8.
- Un enfant à ma porte. Montréal: Boréal. 2008. ISBN 978-276-460-637-7.
- Espèces. Montréal: Boréal. 2010. ISBN 978-276-462-037-3.
- La Rive est loin. Montréal: Boréal. 2012. ISBN 978-276-462-214-8.
- La lenteur des montagnes. Montréal: Boréal. 2014. ISBN 978-276-462-330-5.
- Blessures. Montréal: Boréal. 2016. ISBN 978-276-462-448-7.
- Rayonnements. Montréal: Leméac. 2020. ISBN 978-276-094-840-2.

== Awards ==
Chen has twice been nominated for the Governor General's Award for French-language fiction: once for L'ingratitude in 1995 and again for Immobile in 1998. L'ingratitude was also nominated for a Prix Femina (1995).

Year	Prize	Awarded for	Awarding body	Ref
1995	Prix Québec-Paris	L'ingratitude	General Delegation of Quebec in Paris and the Fédération France-Quebec	
1996	Prix Des Libraires Du Quebec Laureat Roman québécois	L'ingratitude	Association des libraires du Québec	
1996	Grand prix des lectrices de Elle Québec	L'ingratitude	Elle Québec	
1998	Prix Alfred-DesRochers	Immobile	Association des auteures et auteurs de l'Estrie	
2003	Chevalier, Ordre des Arts et des Lettres	-	French Ministry of Culture	
2015	Gérald-Moreau Award for Francophone Writing	La lenteur des montagnes	La Fédération des francophones de la Colombie-Britannique	
2021	Prix Ringuet	Rayonnements	Académie des lettres du Québec	
