= Sophie Létourneau =

Canadian author

Sophie Létourneau (born September 12, 1980) is a Canadian writer. She is most noted for her 2020 novel Chasse à l'homme, which won the Governor General's Award for French-language fiction at the 2020 Governor General's Awards.
