= Dominique Scali =

Canadian novelist and journalist

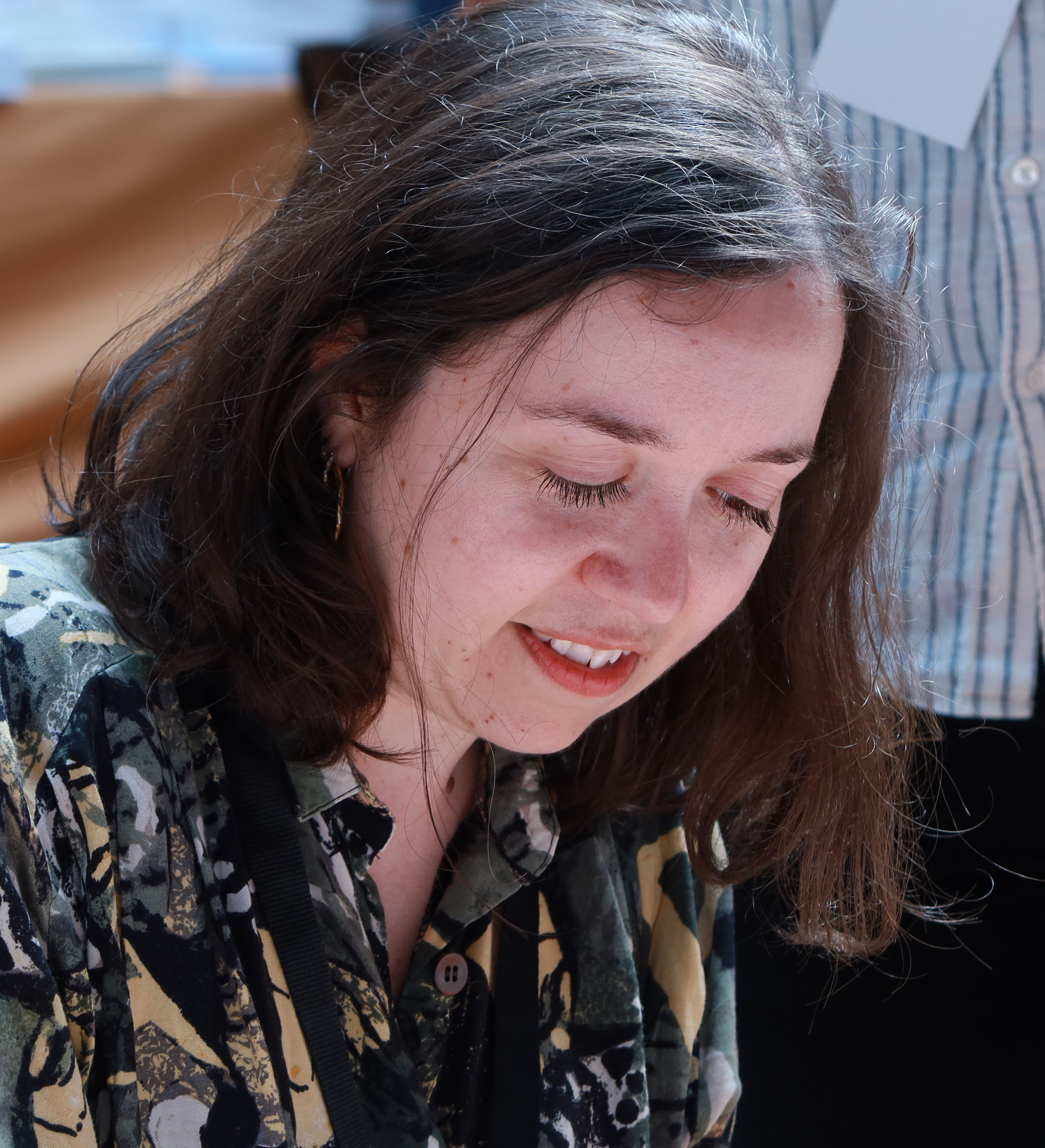

Dominique Scali is a Canadian novelist and journalist from Quebec. She was a shortlisted finalist for the Governor General's Award for French-language fiction at the 2015 Governor General's Awards for her debut novel À la recherche de New Babylon, and W. Donald Wilson was shortlisted for the Governor General's Award for French to English translation at the 2017 Governor General's Awards for the novel's English translation In Search of New Babylon.

As a journalist, she works for Le Journal de Montréal. Her most recent novel is Les marins ne savent pas nager (2022).
