= José Luis Olaizola =

Spanish writer (1927–2025)

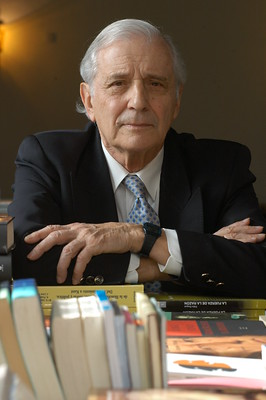
Olaizola in 2004

José Luis Olaizola Sarriá (25 December 1927 – 2 June 2025) was a Spanish writer.

== Life and death ==
Olaizola was born in San Sebastián, Spain on 25 December 1927. He was a lawyer for 15 years, until he found his vocation in writing. Olaizola wrote novels such as La guerra del general Escobar which received the Premio Planeta of 1983. He also wrote Planicio which garnered the Premio Ateneo de Sevilla 1976.

His book Cucho received the Premio de Literatura Infantil Barco de Vapor. Its French version received the Grand Prix de l'Académie des Lecteurs, Paris.

Among his other works are:

- El Cid, el último héroe;
- Hernán Cortés, crónica de un imposible;
- Bartolomé de Las Casas, crónica de un sueño;
- Los amores de Teresa de Jesús;
- Un escritor en busca de Dios;
- Viaje al fondo de la esperanza
- Más allá de la muerte.

His works that have been translated into English are: Journey to the Depths of Hope, My Spiritual Crossing, The Loves of Theresa of Jesus, The Fire of Love (about Saint John of the Cross).

He also worked for film and received international awards. He wrote periodically for Telva, ABC, Mundo Cristiano, Ya, Ideal, El Noticiero Universal, Palabra, Colección Arvo, Alfa y Omega and other journals.

Olaizola died on 2 June 2025, at the age of 97.
