= Abla Farhoud =

Canadian playwright and writer (1945–2021)

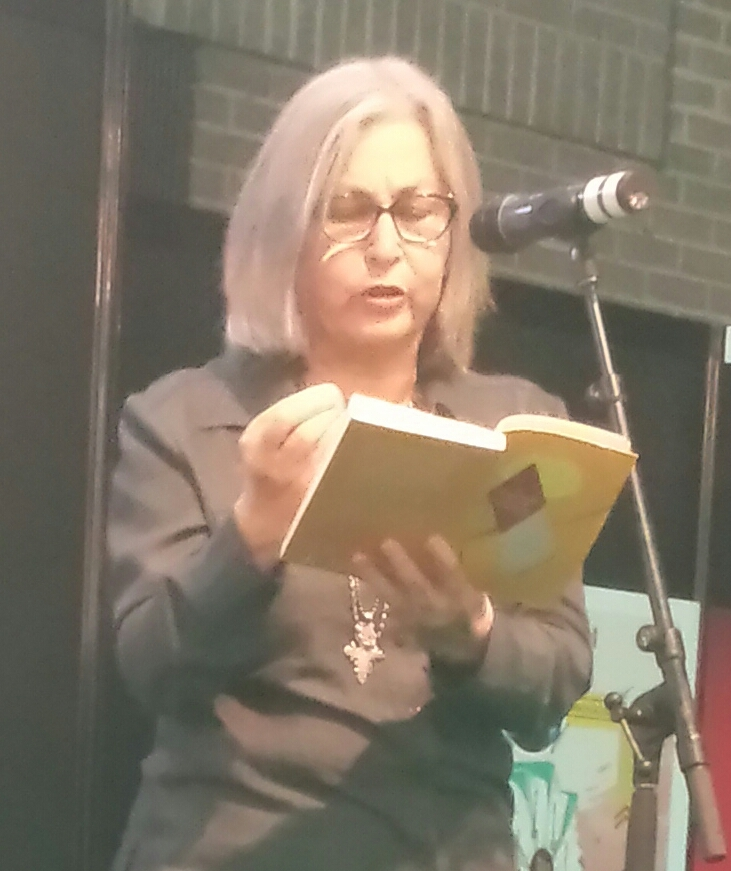
Farhoud at SLM 2018

Abla Farhoud (1945 – December 1, 2021) was a Lebanese-born Canadian writer and playwright who lived in Quebec.

== Life ==
Farhoud was born in the village of Ain-Hirsché and came with her family to Montreal in 1951. In her late teens, she became a comedian, performing on Radio-Canada television. She returned to Lebanon with her family in 1965. Then, in 1969, Farhoud went to Paris, where she studied theatre at the Université de Vincennes à Paris. She returned to Quebec in 1973 and earned a master's degree in theatre from the Université du Québec à Montréal. Her play Les filles du 5-10-15¢ was performed at the Festival des francophonies en Limousin in 1992. Her play La Possession du Prince received the Prix de Théâtre et Liberté from the French Société des Auteurs et Compositeurs Dramatiques. Her writing incorporates Quebec slang "joual", French, colloquial French, colloquial Lebanese-Arabic, English and Arabic.

Her son Mathieu Farhoud-Dionne is a member of the hip hop group Loco Locass.

== Selected works ==
=== Plays ===
- Quand j'étais grande (1983), translated into English as When I was grown up by Jill MacDougall
- Les Filles du 5-10-15¢ (1993), translated into English as The Girls from the Five and Ten by Jill MacDougall
- La Possession du prince (1993)
- Jeux de patience (1994), translated into English as Game of Patience by Jill MacDougall
- Quand le vautour danse (1997), translated into English as Birds of Prey by Jill MacDougall
- Les Rues de l'alligator (1998)
- Maudite machine (1999)

=== Novels ===
- Le bonheur a la queue glissante (1998), received the Prix France-Québec, translated into English as Happiness Has a Slippery Tail by Judith Weisz Woodsworth (2025)
- Splendide solitude (2001)
- Le fou d'Omar (2005)
- Le Sourire de la Petite Juive (2011), translated into English as Hutchison Street by Judith Weisz Woodworth (2018)
- Au grand soleil cachez vos filles (2017)
- Le Dernier des snoreaux (2019)
- Havre-Saint-Pierre, pour toujours (2022)
