= Fanny Britt =

Canadian playwright and translator

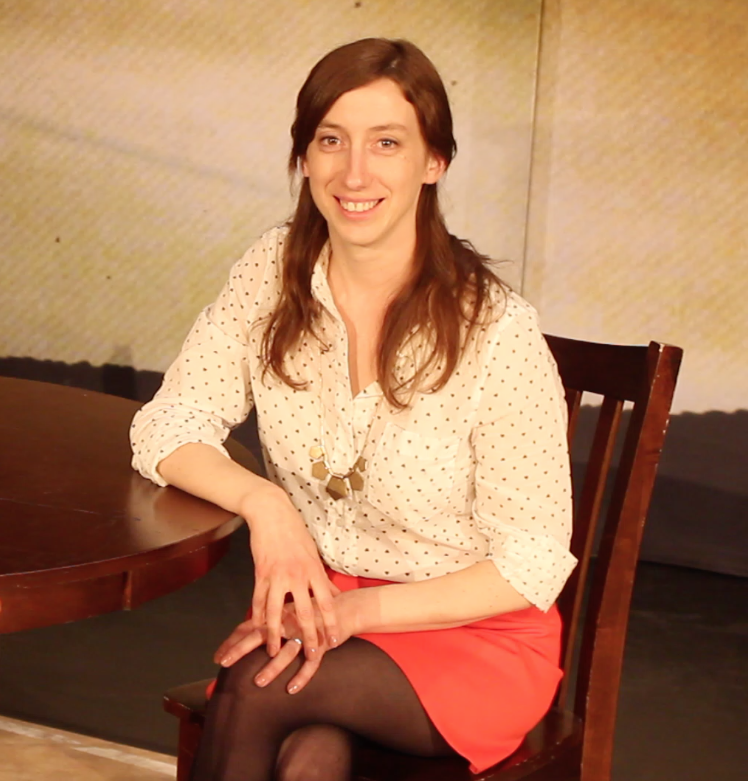
Fanny Britt on the set of her play Bienveillance at the Théâtre des Eskers in Amos, Quebec (2014).

Fanny Iseult Britt (born 1977) is a Canadian playwright and translator living in Quebec.

She was born in Amos and grew up in Montreal. She studied playwriting at the National Theatre School of Canada, graduating in 2001.

In 2008, she founded Théâtre Debout with Geoffrey Gaquère and Johanne Haberlin.

She was the winner of the Governor General's Award for French-language drama at the 2013 Governor General's Awards for her play Bienveillance, and of the Governor General's Award for French-language fiction at the 2021 Governor General's Awards for her novel Faire les sucres.

She contributed to the Télé-Québec series Tactik.

Sugaring Off, a translation by Susan Ouriou of Faire les sucres, was longlisted for the 2025 Giller Prize.

== Works ==
=== Translations ===
- The Beauty Queen of Leenane by Martin McDonagh for Théâtre La Licorne and Théâtre du Trident
- The Pillowman by Martin McDonagh
- The Lonesome West by Martin McDonagh
- Kvetch by Steven Berkoff for Théâtre Niveau Parking
- The Adventures of Tom Sawyer by Mark Twain for Théâtre de la Petite Marée
- The Good Person of Setzuan by Bertolt Brecht for Théâtre du Trident
- Cul-de-sac by Daniel MacIvor for the Carrefour international de théâtre de Québec
- Half Life by John Mighton for the Carrefour international de théâtre de Québec
- Orphans by Dennis Kelly for Théâtre La Licorne
- After the End by Dennis Kelly for Théâtre La Licorne
- Love and Money by Dennis Kelly for Théâtre La Licorne
- Girls and Boys by Dennis Kelly for Théâtre La Licorne
- The Wolves by Sarah DeLappe
- hang by debbie tucker green
- The Doctor by Robert Icke
- Consent by Nina Raine
- Forget Me Not by Tom Holloway
- The McAlpine Spillway by Naomi Wallace
- Crumble by Sheila Callaghan
- The Clean House by Sarah Ruhl
- Dead Man's Cell Phone by Sarah Ruhl for Théâtre Debout
- The Watershed by Annabel Soutar
- Seeds by Annabel Soutar for Théâtre La Licorne
- All of It by Alistair McDowall for Théâtre de Quat'Sous
- Closer by Patrick Marber for Jean-Duceppe Company

=== Plays ===
- Honey Pie (2003)
- Couche avec moi (c'est l'hiver) (2006)
- Hôtel Pacifique (2009)
- Enquête sur le pire (2010)
- Chaque jour (2011)
- Bienveillance (2012)
- Cinq à sept (with Mani Soleymanlou, 2015)
- Hurlevents (2018)
- Toutes choses (2022)
- Lysis (with Alexia Bürger, 2024)
- Classique(s) (with Mani Soleymanlou, 2025)

=== Novels ===
- Les maisons (2015) (translated into English in 2017 by Susan Ouriou and Christelle Morelli under the title Hunting Houses)
- Faire les sucres (2020) (translated into English in 2024 by Susan Ouriou under the title Sugaring Off)

=== Youth literature ===
- Félicien et la grosse pomme
- Félicien et les baleines
- Félicien et la grotte
- Jane, le renard et moi
- Truffe (illustrations by Isabelle Arsenault, translated into English by Susan Ouriou as Forever Truffle)
