= Catherine Millet =

French art critic and author (born 1948)

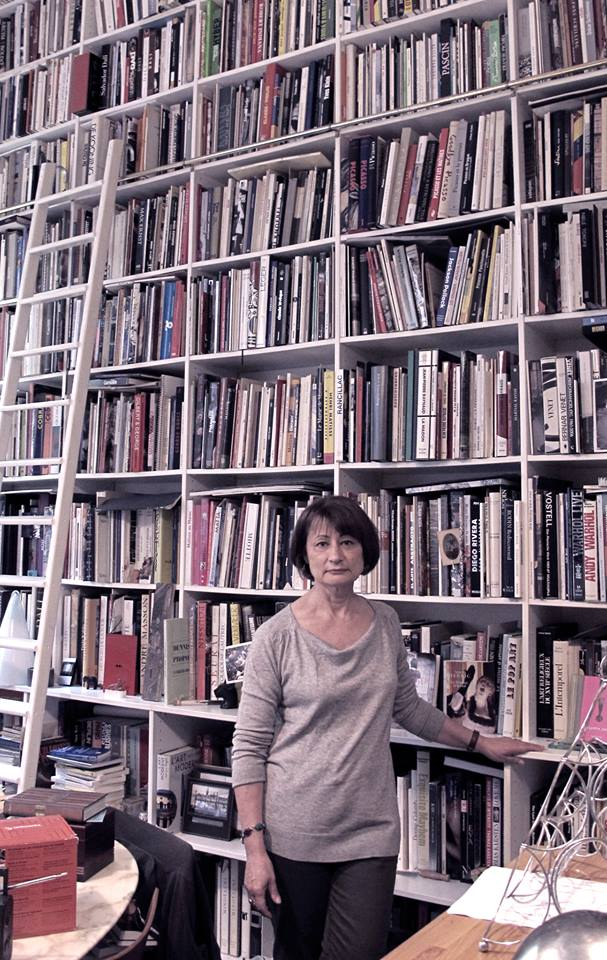
Catherine Millet at home

Catherine Millet (French: [katʁin mijɛ]; born 1 April 1948) is a French writer, art critic, curator, and founder and editor of the magazine Art Press, which focuses on modern art and contemporary art.

== Biography ==
Born in Bois-Colombes, France, she is best known as the author of the 2002 memoir The Sexual Life of Catherine M.; the book details her sexual history, from childhood masturbation to an adult fascination with group sex. The book was reviewed by Edmund White as "the most explicit book about sex ever written by a woman".

In 2008 she published a sequel of sorts called Jour de Souffrance, translated to English in 2009 as Jealousy: The Other Life of Catherine M.

She is married to the poet and novelist Jacques Henric.

In April 2016, Catherine Millet received the Prix François Morellet from Régine Catin, Laurent Hamon and Philippe Méaille. Awarded during the National Days of Book and Wine (Saumur), in partnership with the Château de Montsoreau-Museum of Contemporary Art; it rewards a personality for their commitment and their writings in favor of contemporary art.

== Views on rape and male chauvinism ==
In December 2017, during an interview on the French radio France Culture she claimed "I really regret not having been raped, because I could show that you can recover from it".

In January 2018 Millet co-authored a public letter to Le Monde newspaper criticising the #MeToo movement, defending men’s “freedom to bother women,” which they said was “indispensable to sexual freedom.” The letter was signed by over a hundred French women, including actress Catherine Deneuve, and generated considerable controversy.

== Decorations ==
- Officer of the Order of Arts and Letters (2016)
