= Prix France-Québec =

Canadian literary award

The Prix France-Québec is a Canadian literary award, presented to a Canadian French language writer who has published work in either Canada or France.

Administered by Quebec's General Delegation in Paris and the Fédération France-Quebec, the award was first presented in 1958 as the Prix Québec-Paris. Although nominally presented for an individual title, in practice it was often awarded to honour the writer's entire body of work. Following the 1997 awards, it was renamed to Prix France-Québec in 1998.

== Winners ==
=== Prix Québec-Paris ===
- 1958 - Anne Hébert, Les Chambres de bois
- 1961 - Yves Thériault, Agaguk and Ashini
- 1962 - Jean Le Moyne, Convergences and Jacques Godbout, L'Aquarium
- 1963 - Alain Grandbois, Poèmes and Gilles Marcotte, Une littérature qui se fait
- 1964 - Jean-Paul Pinsonneault, Les Terres sèches
- 1965 - Georges-André Vachon, Le Temps et l'Espace dans l'œuvre de Claudel
- 1966 - Roland Giguère, L'Âge de la parole
- 1967 - Jean Éthier-Blais, Signets I et II
- 1968 - Jacques Brault, Mémoire et Étude sur Alain Grandbois
- 1969 - Jean-Guy Pilon, Comme eau retenue
- 1970 - Gaston Miron, L'Homme rapaillé
- 1971 - Naïm Kattan, Le Réel et le Théâtral
- 1972 - Fernand Ouellette, Poésie
- 1973 - Rina Lasnier, Poèmes, tomes I et II
- 1974 - Jacques Folch-Ribas, Une aurore boréale
- 1975 - Antonine Maillet, Mariaagélas
- 1976 - Réjean Ducharme, Les Enfantômes
- 1977 - Louis Caron, L'Emmitouflé
- 1978 - André G. Bourassa, Surréalisme dans la littérature québécoise
- 1979 - Victor-Lévy Beaulieu, Monsieur Melville
- 1980 - Claude Jasmin, La Sablière
- 1981 - Laurent Mailhot et Pierre Nepveu, Anthologie de la poésie québécoise
- 1982 - Roger Fournier, Le Cercle des arènes
- 1983 - Suzanne Jacob, Laura Laur
- 1984 - Michel Tremblay, La Duchesse et le Roturier et Des nouvelles d'Édouard
- 1985 - Robert Lalonde, Une belle journée d'avance
- 1986 - Jacques Boulerice, Apparence
- 1987 - Gérald Godin, Ils ne demandaient qu'à brûler
- 1988 - Pierre Morency, Quand nous serons
- 1989 - Jacques Poulin, Le Vieux Chagrin
- 1990 - Yves Préfontaine, Parole tenue, poèmes 1954-1985
- 1991 - Paul Zumthor, La Traversée
- 1992 - Pauline Harvey, Un homme est une valse
- 1993 - Monique Proulx, Homme invisible à la fenêtre
- 1994 - Sergio Kokis, Le Pavillon des miroirs
- 1995 - Ying Chen, L'Ingratitude
- 1996 - Francine D'Amour, Presque rien
- 1997 - Jean-Jacques Nattiez, Opera

=== Prix France-Québec ===
- 1998 - Bruno Hébert, C’est pas moi, je le jure!
- 1999 - Abla Farhoud, Le bonheur à la queue glissante
- 2000 - Christiane Duchesne, L’Homme des silences
- 2001 - Micheline Lafrance, Le don d’Auguste
- 2002 - Guillaume Vigneault, Chercher le vent
- 2003 - Esther Croft, De belles paroles
- 2004 - Jean Lemieux, On finit toujours par payer
- 2005 - Jean Barbe, Comment devenir un monstre
- 2006 - Sergio Kokis, La Gare
- 2007 - Myriam Beaudoin, Hadassa
- 2008 - Christine Eddie, Les Carnets de Douglas
- 2009 - Marie-Christine Bernard, Mademoiselle Personne
- 2010 - Michèle Plomer, HKPQ
- 2011 - Lucie Lachapelle, Rivière Mékiskan
- 2012 - Jocelyne Saucier, Il pleuvait des oiseaux
- 2013 - Marie-Hélène Poitras, Griffintown
- 2014 - Catherine Leroux, Le mur mitoyen
- 2015 - Biz, Mort-Terrain
- 2016 - Anaïs Barbeau-Lavalette, La femme qui fuit
- 2017 - Christian Guay-Poliquin, Le Poids de la neige
- 2018 - Éric Plamondon, Taqawan
- 2019 - Matthieu Simard, Les Écrivements
- 2020 - Michel Jean, Kukum
- 2022 - Louis-François Dallaire, Le jour où mon meilleur ami fut arrêté pour le meurtre de sa femme
