= Le Combat des livres =

Annual "battle of the books" competition

- Running time: 30 min.
- Country of origin: Canada
- Language: French
- Home station: Ici Radio-Canada Première
- Hosted by: Marie-France Bazzo; Christiane Charette; Marie-Louise Arsenault
- Original release: 2004 – present
- No. of series: 16

Le Combat des livres is an annual "battle of the books" competition organized and broadcast by Ici Radio-Canada Première in Canada. A French edition of the Canada Reads competition, the program was launched in 2004. It aired annually from 2004 to 2014, and was then discontinued until being revived in 2018.

Unlike the English program, which selects a different theme of the "One Book to..." variety each year, the French program normally selects books based on the regions of Canada, with one book representing each of Atlantic Canada, Quebec, Ontario, Western Canada and the Indigenous peoples of Canada each year.

Both the English and French programs sometimes, but not always, include one personality more commonly associated with the other language community, who champions a translated work. One advocate, Maureen McTeer, appeared on both programs in the same year, championing the same novel in both its original English and translated French editions. Several other novels have also been chosen for both programs, although their English and French versions were not chosen by the same advocate or in the same year; one novel to date, Lawrence Hill's The Book of Negroes (French title Aminata) has won both competitions.

In 2021, for the first time in the history of the series the network produced two separate editions, one devoted to adult literature and one devoted to youth literature. The adult literature debates remain between celebrity personalities, while the youth literature debates take place between francophone teenagers selected through a school competition, with the winner of the debates settled by a judges' panel instead of through voting by the participants.

== 2004 ==
Radio-Canada, the French-language service of CBC, aired a French version of Canada Reads, entitled Le combat des livres ("Battle of the Books"), from March 29 to April 2, 2004. It was moderated by Marie-France Bazzo.

| Author | Title | Advocate |
|---|---|---|
| Gil Courtemanche | Un dimanche à la piscine à Kigali | Laure Waridel |
| Margaret Atwood | La servante écarlate | Julius Grey |
| Jacques Godbout | Une histoire américaine | Gérald Larose |
| Yann Martel | L'histoire de Pi | Louise Forestier |
| Gaétan Soucy | La petite fille qui aimait trop les allumettes | Micheline Lanctôt |

== 2005 ==
The 2005 edition of Le Combat des livres aired from March 14 to March 18, 2005. It was moderated by Marie-France Bazzo.

| Author | Title | Advocate |
|---|---|---|
| Réjean Ducharme | L'Avalée des avalés | Sophie Cadieux |
| Nancy Huston | Dolce agonia | Réjean Thomas |
| Jean-Jacques Pelletier | La Chair disparue | Alain Lefèvre |
| Elizabeth Smart | À la hauteur de Grand Central Station, je me suis assise et j'ai pleuré | Dennis Trudeau |
| Michel Tremblay | Thérèse et Pierrette à l'école des Saints-Anges | Monique Simard |

== 2006 ==
The 2006 edition of Le Combat des livres aired from January 30 to February 3. It was moderated by Marie-France Bazzo.

| Author | Title | Advocate |
|---|---|---|
| Francine Noël | La Femme de ma vie | Françoise Guénette |
| Hubert Aquin | Prochain épisode | Pierre Lebeau |
| Jean Barbe | Comment devenir un monstre | Lucie Laurier |
| Stéphane Dompierre | Un petit pas pour l'homme | Louis-José Houde |
| Frances Itani | Une coquille de silence | Maureen McTeer |

== 2007 ==
The 2007 edition of Le Combat des livres aired from February 26 to March 2 and was moderated by Christiane Charette.

| Author | Title | Advocate |
|---|---|---|
| Denis Thériault | L'Iguane | Dominique Lévesque |
| Marie Laberge | Le poids des ombres | Pauline Marois |
| Mathyas Lefebure | D'où viens-tu berger? | Robert Frosi |
| Yann Martel | Self | Sheila Copps |
| Christian Mistral | Vamp | Biz |

== 2008 ==
The 2008 edition of Le Combat des livres aired from February 25 to February 29 and was once again chaired by Christiane Charette.

| Author | Title | Advocate |
|---|---|---|
| Éric Dupont | La Logeuse | Nicolas Langelier |
| Marie-Claire Blais | Une saison dans la vie d'Emmanuel | Serge Denoncourt |
| Jacques Godbout | La concierge du Panthéon | Bernard Landry |
| Mordecai Richler | Le Monde de Barney | Anne Lagacé Dowson |
| Gabrielle Roy | La Détresse et l'enchantement | Sophie Faucher |

== 2009 ==
The 2009 edition of Le Combat des livres aired from March 23 to 27, and was once again chaired by Christiane Charette.

| Author | Title | Advocate |
|---|---|---|
| Rawi Hage | Parfum de poussière | Brendan Kelly |
| Gérard Bouchard | Mistouk | Raymond Gravel |
| Jean-François Beauchemin | La fabrication de l'aube | Emmanuel Bilodeau |
| D. Y. Béchard | Vandal Love | Esther Bégin |
| Marie-Sissi Labrèche | Borderline | Janette Bertrand |

== 2010 ==
The 2010 edition of Le Combat des livres aired from March 22 to 26. Christiane Charette moderated.

| Author | Title | Advocate |
|---|---|---|
| Dany Laferrière | L'énigme du retour | Françoise David |
| Jean Barbe | Comment devenir un ange | Marie-Soleil Michon |
| Patrice Desbiens | L'Homme invisible | Thomas Hellman |
| Germaine Guèvremont | Le survenant | Christian Dufour |
| Nancy Huston | Cantique des plaines | Christopher Hall |

== 2011 ==
The 2011 edition of Le Combat des livres aired from March 14 to 18. Christiane Charette moderated.

| Author | Title | Advocate |
|---|---|---|
| Perrine Leblanc | L'homme blanc | Geneviève Guérard |
| David Gilmour | L'École des films | Anne-France Goldwater |
| Dany Laferrière | Comment faire l'amour avec un nègre sans se fatiguer | Patrick Lagacé |
| Émile Ollivier | Mère-Solitude | JiCi Lauzon |
| Danielle Trussart | Le train pour Samarcande | Djemila Benhabib |

== 2012 ==
Beginning in 2012, the production and broadcast of Le Combat des livres was transferred from Charette's program to the network's new literature show Plus on est de fous, plus on lit!, hosted by Marie-Louise Arsenault.

| Author | Title | Advocate |
|---|---|---|
| Marie-Renée Lavoie | La petite et le vieux | Yves Lamontagne |
| Margaret Atwood | La voleuse d'hommes | Tasha Kheiriddin |
| Guy Delisle | Chroniques de Jérusalem | Gildor Roy |
| Abla Farhoud | Le sourire de la petite juive | Nabila Ben Youssef |

== 2013 ==
The 2013 edition of Le Combat des livres aired from March 18 to 22. Marie-Louise Arsenault moderated. It was an all star season featuring previous winners.

| Author | Title | Advocate |
|---|---|---|
| Lawrence Hill | Aminata | Thomas Hellman |
| Jocelyne Saucier | Il pleuvait des oiseaux | Geneviève Guérard |
| Heather O'Neill | La Ballade de Baby | Brendan Kelly |
| Samuel Archibald | Arvida | Bernard Landry |
| Éric Dupont | La fiancée américaine | Dominique Levesque |

== 2014 ==
The 2014 edition of Le Combat des livres aired from March 31 to April 3. Marie-Louise Arsenault moderated.

| Author | Title | Advocate |
|---|---|---|
| Marie-Claire Blais | La Belle Bête | Paul Cargnello |
| François Gravel | Adieu, Betty Crocker | Pauline Martin |
| Rohinton Mistry | L'Équilibre du monde | Azeb Wolde-Giorghis |
| Kim Thúy | Ru | Jean-François Chicoine |

== 2018 ==
The 2018 edition of Le Combat des livres, the first time the show has aired since 2014, ran from May 7 to 11, 2018. Marie-Louise Arsenault moderated. The books were selected to represent the regions of Canada, with one book representing each of Atlantic Canada, Quebec, Ontario, Western Canada and the Indigenous peoples of Canada.

| Author | Title | Advocate |
|---|---|---|
| Katherena Vermette | Ligne brisée | Naomi Fontaine |
| Margaret Atwood | C'est le coeur qui lâche en dernier | Russell Smith |
| Stéfanie Clermont | Le jeu de la musique | Philippe-Audrey Larrue-St-Jacques |
| Nancy Huston | Le club des miracles relatifs | Ibrahima Diallo |
| Sara Tilley | Écorchée | Antonine Maillet |

== 2019 ==
The 2019 edition of Le Combat des livres aired from May 6 to 10, 2019, with Marie-Louise Arsenault moderating. The books were selected on the same theme of regional representation as the 2018 edition, with one book selected to represent each of Canada's four major geographic regions and one book selected to represent indigenous literature.

| Author | Title | Advocate |
|---|---|---|
| Blaise Ndala | Sans capote ni kalachnikov | Marie-Maude Denis |
| France Daigle | Pour sûr | Édith Butler |
| Naomi Fontaine | Manikanetish | Stanley Vollant |
| Karoline Georges | De synthèse | Manal Drissi |
| Miriam Toews | Pauvres petits chagrins | Deni Ellis Béchard |

== 2020 ==
| Author | Title | Advocate |
|---|---|---|
| Nadine Bismuth | Un lien familial | France D'Amour |
| Marguerite Andersen | La mauvaise mère | Dominique Demers |
| Gérald Leblanc | Moncton mantra | Julie Aubé |
| J. R. Léveillé | Le soleil du lac qui se couche | Alpha Toshineza |
| Richard Wagamese | Cheval Indien | Romeo Saganash |

== 2021 ==
In 2021, Ici Radio-Canada Première planned two separate editions of Le Combat des livres, one devoted to young adult literature, with the five selected books advocated by francophone teenagers, and another for adult literature. The teen competition was staged in March 2021, while the adult competition took place May 3 to 7.

Writer Simon Boulerice and actress Catherine Trudeau also participated in the youth debates as assistant moderators.

=== Combat national des livres ===
The adult literature competition was staged from May 3 to 7, 2021.

| Author | Title | Advocate |
|---|---|---|
| Michel Jean | Kukum | Michèle Audette |
| Jean Babineau | Infini | Brian Gallant |
| Simone Chaput | Que serions-nous sans le secours de ce qui n’existe pas? | Corey Loranger |
| Caroline Dawson | Là où je me terre | Michel Marc Bouchard |
| Melchior Mbonimpa | Le totem des Baranda | Tanya Lapointe |

=== Combat des livres jeunesse ===
| Author | Title | Advocate |
|---|---|---|
| Patrick Isabelle | Camille | Amélie |
| Sarah-Maude Beauchesne | Cœur de slush | Anaïs |
| Dominique Demers | L'albatros et la mésange | Daphnée |
| Michel Noël | Hush! Hush! | Pierre |
| Andrée Poulin | J'avais tout prévu sauf les bélugas | Élie |

== 2022 ==
=== Combat national des livres ===
The adult literature competition was staged from May 2 to 6, 2022.

| Author | Title | Advocate |
|---|---|---|
| Vanessa Léger | L’averti : La naissance d’une dynastie | Serge Brideau |
| Dawn Dumont | La course de Rose (Rose's Run) | Isabelle Picard |
| Paul Serge Forest | Tout est ori | Charlotte Aubin |
| Daniel Poliquin | Le vol de l'ange | Blaise Ndala |
| Ying Chen | Rayonnements | Jean Grand-Maître |

=== Combat des livres jeunesse ===
| Author | Title | Advocate |
|---|---|---|
| Edith Kabuya | Victoire-Divine | Léonie |
| Elizabeth Baril-Lessard | Ma vie de gâteau sec | Maya |
| Samuel Champagne | Adam | William |
| Amélie Panneton | Comme une chaleur de feu de camp | Mila |
| Marc-André Pilon | Infectés | Léon |

== 2023 ==
=== Combat national des livres ===
The adult literature competition was staged from May 15 to 18, 2023.

| Author | Title | Advocate |
|---|---|---|
| Sébastien Bérubé | Rivières-aux-Cartouches | Gabriel Robichaud |
| Roxanne Bouchard | Nous étions le sel de la mer | Gilles Renaud |
| Jean-Pierre Dubé | Le Radeau | Patricia Bitu Tshikudi |
| Chloé LaDuchesse | L'Incendiare de Sudbury | Brigitte Noël |
| Drew Hayden Taylor (tr. Eva Lavergne) | Le baiser de Nanabush (Motorcycles & Sweetgrass) | Xavier Watson |

=== Combat des livres jeunesse ===
| Author | Title | Advocate |
|---|---|---|
| Andrée Poulin | La plus grosse poutine du monde | Nico |
| Laurence Beaudoin-Masse | Rentrer son ventre et sourire | Evie |
| Pierre-Alexandre Bonin | Chasseurs de légendes tome 1 : la colère de la Dame blanche | Ella |
| Luc Gélinas | C'est la faute à Ovechkin | Alexis |
| Magali Laurent | L’ogre et l’enfant | Adam |

== 2024 ==
=== Combat national des livres ===
The 2024 edition was staged from May 17 to 20.

| Author | Title | Advocate |
|---|---|---|
| Emmanuelle Pierrot | La version qui n’intéresse personne | David Thibodeau |
| Tomson Highway (tr. Robert Dickson) | Le baiser de la Reine blanche (Kiss of the Fur Queen) | Jocelyn Sioui |
| Didier Leclair | Le prince africain, le traducteur et le nazi | Alison Vicrobeck |
| Francis Ouellette | Mélasse de fantaisie | Chantal Lamarre |
| Annie-Claude Thériault | Les Foley | Diane Losier |

=== Combat des livres jeunesse ===
| Author | Title | Advocate |
|---|---|---|
| Isabelle Picard | Nish, tome 1 : le Nord et le Sud | Adriene |
| Roxane Jérôme | Délivrée | Rose |
| Martine Latulippe | Le Cri | Gabrielle |
| Pascale Quiviger | Le royaume de Pierre d’Angle T. 1 : l’art du naufrage | Matys |
| Louis-Pierre Sicard | Les orphelins du roi : intégrale 1 | Simon |

== 2025 ==
The adult debates were staged from June 9 to 12, 2025, with the youth debate staged on June 13.

=== Combat national des livres ===
| Author | Title | Advocate |
|---|---|---|
| Naomi Fontaine | Kuessipan | Ghislain Picard |
| Claude Guilmain | Welsford | Sheila Copps |
| Dyane Léger | Mayday | Xénia Gould |
| Andrée A. Michaud | Baignades | Mariana Mazza |
| Candace Savage (tr. Michel Saint-Germain) | Des inconnus sous mon toit (Strangers in the House) | Alexis Normand |

=== Combat des livres jeunesse ===
| Author | Title | Advocate |
|---|---|---|
| Jean-François Sénéchal | Le boulevard | Sofia |
| Joanie Boutin | Poussière d’été | Rayanne |
| Fanny Britt | Jane, le renard et moi | Alia |
| Catherine Fouron | Vieille branche | Mateo |
| Caroline Héroux | Défense d’entrer! T. 1 : Réservé aux gars | Viani |
