= Anne-France Goldwater =

Canadian lawyer and academic

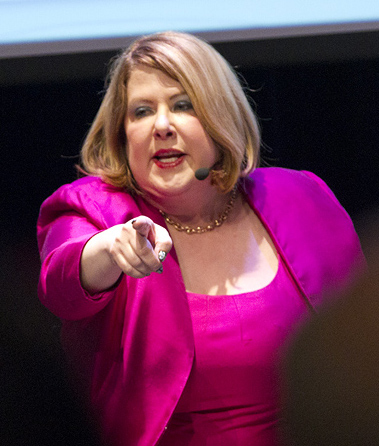
- Born: July 14, 1960 (age 66); Montreal, Quebec, Canada
- Education: McGill University
- Occupations: Lawyer, television personality
- Website: https://goldwaterdroit.com/

Anne-France Goldwater (born July 14, 1960) is a Canadian lawyer and television personality, best known as the arbitrator on L'Arbitre, a court show which debuted on the V television network in 2011.

Goldwater was born in Montreal, Quebec, the daughter of lawyers Sam Goldwater and Ruth Zendel. She studied law at McGill University before being admitted to the Bar of Quebec in 1981.

== Law ==
A family law lawyer from Montreal, Goldwater was a partner with Marie-Hélène Dubé in the firm of Goldwater, Dubé. Dubé was named judge to the Superior Court of Quebec on March 25, 2022 and the firm changed names to Goldwater Droit. The firm has been involved in some of Quebec's highest-profile family law cases, including Hendricks and Leboeuf v. Quebec, the Quebec Superior Court case which legalized same-sex marriage in Quebec; Lola vs. Eric, a case which resulted in the Quebec Court of Appeal declaring parts of Quebec's common-law marriage legislation to be unconstitutional in its denial of alimony and matrimonial regime rights, a decision ultimately overturned by the Supreme Court; and Bruker v. Markovitz, a Supreme Court case which found that a Jewish man could be held legally responsible for refusing to grant his former wife a get following their civil divorce.

On November 30, 2023, An Act to establish the Unified Family Tribunal within the Court of Québec, commonly referred to as Bill 91, came into effect. The legislation formed part of a broader reform of Quebec family law that followed sustained debate over the legal status of de facto spouses after the Supreme Court of Canada decision in Quebec (Attorney General) v. A (commonly known as Eric v. Lola) in 2013. In 2025, Goldwater filed a constitutional challenge to the Unified Family Tribunal, alleging that aspects of the new regime infringe the Canadian Charter of Rights and Freedoms and improperly transfer jurisdiction from the Superior Court of Quebec.

She received the SOGIC Ally Award from the Canadian Bar Association's Sexual Orientation and Gender Identity Conference in 2003 for her role in Hendricks and Leboeuf v. Quebec.

== Broadcasting ==
Goldwater has been an outspoken public figure, earning the nickname "Goldfighter" for her sometimes controversial public statements. She was selected to host L'Arbitre in part because of her assertive style, which frequently sees her compared to Judy Sheindlin on the popular courtroom series Judge Judy.

Goldwater was a panelist in the 2011 edition of Première Chaîne's Le Combat des livres, advocating for a French translation of David Gilmour's memoir The Film Club, and in the 2012 edition of CBC Radio's Canada Reads, advocating for John Vaillant's book The Tiger: A True Story of Vengeance and Survival. She was only the second personality, following Maureen McTeer, ever to participate in both the English and French programs.

On the first day of discussions in the English Canada Reads, Goldwater faced criticism after calling Carmen Aguirre "a bloody terrorist", and alleging that Marina Nemat "tells a story that's not true". In response, Nemat posted on Facebook, "I hope [Goldwater] can produce evidence to back up her claims. If not, I would like to receive a public apology from her." Goldwater responded to the criticism by stating that "When you're in a debate, I think it's gloves off. You can't apologize for taking a position in a debate because otherwise you would never take a position in a debate...in this country there is a tolerance for a difference of opinion, and if somebody just doesn't buy your story, they don't buy their story."

However, The Globe and Mail also noted that Goldwater approached the rest of the week's debates in a more conciliatory and supportive tone, and she ultimately voted for Aguirre's book to win the competition. In addition, Globe and Mail literary critic John Barber noted that Goldwater's initial statements about the books were essentially impossible to prove or disprove, writing that "both, with their intensely personal, unverifiable narratives, challenge readers to re-imagine the clouded borderland between fact and fiction."
