= The Beautiful Beast =

- Poster
- French: La Belle bête
- Directed by: Karim Hussain
- Written by: Marie-Claire Blais; Julien Fonfrède; Karim Hussain
- Based on: Mad Shadows (La Belle bête) by Marie-Claire Blais
- Produced by: Anne Cusson; Julien Fonfrède; Karim Hussain
- Starring: Carole Laure; Caroline Dhavernas; Marc-André Grondin
- Cinematography: Karim Hussain
- Edited by: Éric Lavoie
- Music by: David Kristian
- Production companies: Equinox Productions; Screen Machine
- Distributed by: Equinoxe Films
- Release date: October 11, 2006 (Sitges)
- Running time: 110 minutes
- Country: Canada
- Language: French

The Beautiful Beast (French: La Belle bête) is a Canadian drama film, directed by Karim Hussain and released in 2006. An adaptation of Marie-Claire Blais's 1959 novel Mad Shadows (La Belle bête), the film centres on a dysfunctional family headed by single mother Louise (Carole Laure), who has an abusive relationship with her children Patrice (Marc-André Grondin) and Isabelle-Marie (Caroline Dhavernas).

The cast also includes David La Haye, Sébastien Huberdeau, Ludivine Reding, Normand Lévesque, Nicolas Girard Deltruc and Richard Tassé.

The film premiered on October 11, 2006 at the Sitges Film Festival, before going into general release in Quebec on November 3.

Patrick Watson and Dhavernas received a Genie Award nomination for Best Original Song at the 27th Genie Awards in 2007, for the song "Trace-moi".
