= Film club =

Film club may refer to:

- Film society, a membership-based film viewing club
- Film Club (TV series), a BBC show created by Aimee Lou Wood
- Filmclub, a UK education charity
- The Film Club, a 2007 book by David Gilmour
