= InformAction =

Canadian documentary film production company

InformAction Productions
- Type: Production Company
- Industry: Television, Cinema
- Founded: 1971
- Founder: Nathalie Barton; Jean-Claude Bürger; Gérard Le Chêne
- Headquarters: 460 St-Catherine O Street, Montreal, Quebec, Canada
- Website: www.informactionfilms.com

InformAction Productions is a Montreal-based Canadian documentary film production company founded in 1971 by producer Nathalie Barton, directors Jean-Claude Bürger and Gérard Le Chêne. Their films explore major contemporary social and political issues or focus on human stories, art and culture. In 1999 and 2000 producers Ian Quenneville and Ian Oliveri joined the company so as to work with Nathalie Barton.

== Documentaries ==
- Afghan Chronicles, directed by Dominic Morissette (2007)
- After the Outrage, directed by Olivier Lassu (2005)
- Alley Cat Paradise, directed by Manon Barbeau (2004)
- American Fugitive: The Truth About Hassan, directed by Jean-Daniel Lafond (2006)
- The Art of Time, directed by Philippe Baylaucq (2000)
- Bad Girl, directed by Marielle Nitoslawska (2001)
- Battle of Wills, directed by Anne Henderson (2009)
- Body Language, directed by Doïna Harap (2013)
- Born to Be Here, directed by Pierre Mignault (2008)
- Breaking the Silence: Burma's Resistance, directed by Pierre Mignault (2009)
- Chef Thémis, cuisinier sans frontières, directed by Philippe Lavalette (2009)
- City Park, A Little Music for the Soul, directed by Carole Laganière (2006)
- A Dream for Kabul, directed by Philippe Baylaucq (2008)
- Creole Connections, directed by Alain d'Aix (1986)
- East End Kids (Vues de l'est), directed by Carole Laganière (2004)
- East End Forever (L'Est pour toujours), directed by Carole Laganière (2011)
- Faith in Government, directed by Jon Kalina (2014)
- Frameworks: Images of a Changing World (Dans un océan d'images), directed by Helen Doyle (2013)
- The Grand Challenge, directed by Guy Boutin (2014)
- The Genocide in Me, directed by Araz Artinian (2005)
- Last Call for Cuba, directed by Jean-Daniel Lafond (1999)
- Last of the Elephant Men, directed by Daniel Ferguson (2015)
- Lifelike, directed by Tally Abecassis (2005)
- The Magic Touch, directed by Carlos Ferrand (2005)
- Men for Sale (Hommes à louer), directed by Rodrigue Jean (2008)
- The Messengers, directed by Helen Doyle (2003)
- Mind in Motion, directed by Philippe Baylaucq (2008)
- The Moon and the Violin (Un toit, un violon, la lune), directed by Carole Laganière (2003)
- Le Nouveau Visage de Coco, directed by Guy Boutin (2014)
- The Price We Pay, directed by Harold Crooks (2014)
- Rachel, la star aux pieds nus, directed by Pierre Mignault (2013)
- Raiders of the Lost Civilizations, directed by Jean-Claude Bürger (2002)
- Salam Iran, A Persian Letter, directed by Jean-Daniel Lafond (2002)
- The Shaman's Apprentice, directed by Stéphane Bégoin (2002)
- Sand Wars, directed by Denis Delestrac (2013)
- Seeking Refuge, directed by Karen Cho (2009)
- Shock Waves, directed by Pierre Mignault (2007)
- Small Wonders, directed by Tally Abecassis (2009)
- Solo Land, directed by Doïna Harap (2003)
- Solo Parent, directed by Doïna Harap (2005)
- Solo Senior, directed by Doïna Harap (2006)
- Taxi, directed by Wendy Champagne (2013)
- Trains of Life, directed by André Melançon (2013)
- Unlikely Treasures, directed by Tally Abecassis
- Waiting for Spring (En attendant le printemps), directed by Marie-Geneviève Chabot (2013)
- Walk on the Night Side, directed by Arnaud Bouquet (2012)
- Year One (Première année), directed by Carole Laganière (2010)

== Accolades ==
- Toronto International Film Festival - TIFF (Top Ten for The Price We Pay)
- Jutra Award (best Feature Documentary for En attendant le printemps, best feature documentary finalists for Dans un océan d'images and Vues de l'est)
- Gémeaux Awards (Best Culture Documentary for Dans un océan d'images, Best Nature and Sciences Documentary for Le sable, enquête sur une disparition, Best Music for Le Magicien de Kaboul, Diversity Award for Tête de tuque, Best Culture Documentary, Sound, Music for La Griffe magique, Multiculturalism Award for Le Génocide en moi)
- Vancouver Film Critics Circle (Best Canadian Documentary Award for The Price We Pay)
- Hot Docs (ACDI Award of Best International Development Canadian Documentary for Ondes de choc, Best Medium Length Documentary for Un toit, un violon, la lune and for Vues de l'est, Best Photography - Sound for Visionnaires, Best Political Documentary for Haïti dans tous nos rêves)
- Nyon Festival (Jury Award and Cinéma d'Art et d'Essai Award for La Danse avec l'aveugle)
- Eko Film Festival of Prague (Jury "Inspiration" Award for Le sable, enquête sur une disparition)
- FICMA Barcelona (Best Documentary Award for Le sable, enquête sur une disparition)
- FIGRA France (International Competition for Birmanie l'indomptable, "Autrement Vu" Section for Terre d'Asile)
- Vues d'Afrique (Best medium-length Documentary for Rachel, la star aux pieds nus)
- International Forum of North-South Media in Burkina Faso (Jury Coup de coeur for Chef Thémis, cuisinier sans frontières)
- Toronto Human Rights DocFest (First prize for Terre d'asile)
- Staten Island Film Festival (Best International Film for The Genocide in me)
- International Short-Length Film Festival in Grenoble (Jury Award for Contre-Censure)...
