= Marie-France Bazzo =

Canadian television presenter

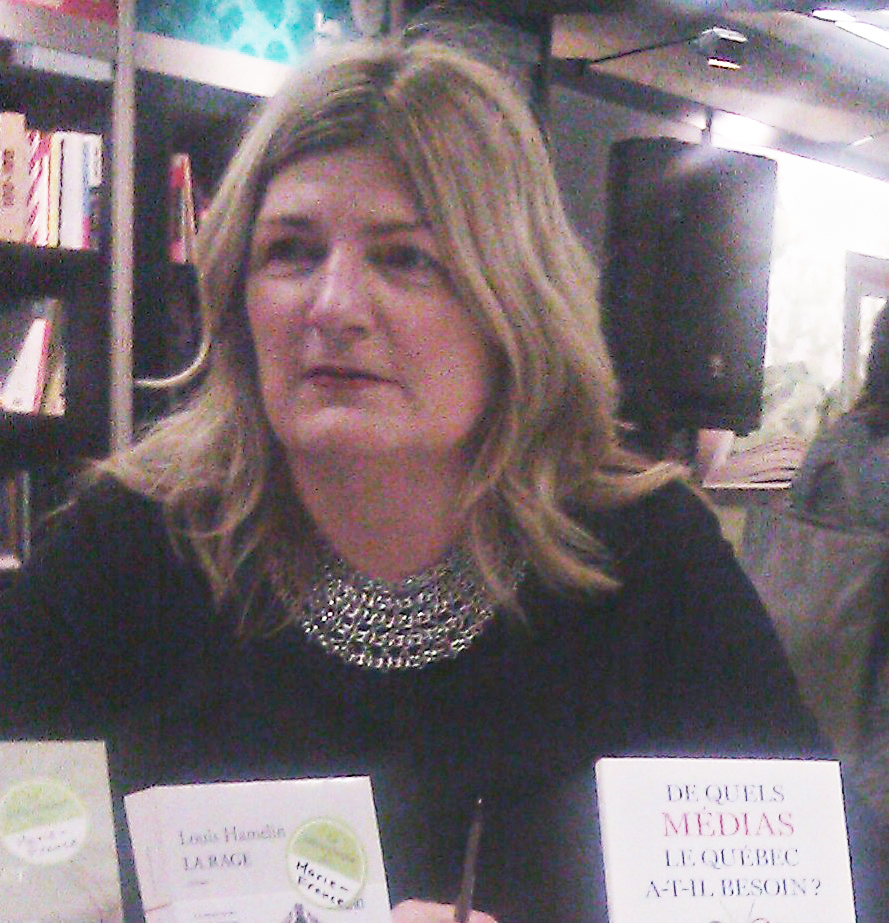
Marie-France Bazzo

Marie-France Bazzo (born July 8, 1961) is a Canadian broadcaster, who has hosted television programming for Télé-Québec and radio programming for the Ici Radio-Canada Première network.

Born in Montreal, she is a graduate of the Université du Québec à Montréal, where she studied sociology.

== Radio ==
She began her career with CIBL-FM in Montreal. She joined Radio-Canada in 1985, hosting programs such as Plaisirs, Dazibazzo, Et quoi encore, VSD Bonjour, Indicatif présent and Le Combat des livres.

From Fall 2013 to Spring 2015, she appeared on CBF-FM, Première's flagship station in Montreal, as host of the daily morning program C'est pas trop tôt !. A frequent guest on the morning show was La Presse columnist François Gagnon.

== Television ==
In 2004, she began hosting Il va y avoir du sport, a political debate show, for Télé-Québec. In 2006, after leaving Première Chaîne, she created a new public affairs series for the network, Bazzo.tv.

She was also a reporter for Télévision de Radio-Canada's cultural magazine show La Bande des six. She left her role as broadcaster at what became Ici Radio-Canada Télé on April 3, 2015 due to disagreements regarding the "show's orientation" with the company.
