= East End Forever =

- French: L'Est pour toujours
- Directed by: Carole Laganière
- Written by: Carole Laganière
- Based on: East End Kids (Vues de l'est) by Carole Laganière
- Produced by: Nathalie Barton
- Cinematography: Philippe Lavalette
- Edited by: Guillaume Millet; France Pilon
- Music by: Bertrand Chénier
- Production company: InformAction Films
- Release date: February 18, 2011
- Running time: 80 minutes
- Country: Canada
- Languages: French; English

East End Forever (French: L'Est pour toujours) is a 2011 Quebec documentary film about seven young people from the Hochelaga-Maisonneuve district of Montreal, written and directed by Carole Laganière. The film debuted at the Grand Library on February 18, 2011, before theatrical release on May 13, 2011.

== Synopsis ==
In 2003, seven children had aspirations for their futures. Revisiting the neighbourhood and the children eight years later, L’Est pour toujours documents the progress they have made in their lives. Marianne Racine reconnected with his father, only to find he lives in Vancouver and does not speak French. Maxime Desjardins-Tremblay has combined work and study as a film and television actor. Though wishing to become a rapper, he still gets caught up in problems with street gangs. Proulx-Roy and Jean-Roch Beauregard, having spent time in youth centers and reform schools, are both still seeking their paths in life. Valérie Allard has aspirations of working with others through social services. Samantha Goyer has completed school. At 21, Vanessa Dumont is the oldest of the seven. She looks far younger than her biological age, but this affects her search for both job and boyfriend, and she deals with dark moods. The film shares how a person's future is not always determined by where they grew up.

== Cast ==
- Marianne Racine
- Maxime Desjardins-Tremblay
- Maxime Proulx-Roy
- Jean-Roch Beauregard
- Valérie Allard
- Samantha Goyer
- Vanessa Dumont

== Background ==
In 2003, Carole Laganière created the film East End Kids (Vues de l’est) to document the lives of seven children, aged eight to twelve, who were being raised in the low income Montreal neighbourhood of Hochelaga-Maisonneuve. At that time the children had aspirations for bright futures. Having kept in contact with the children over the intervening years, Laganière revisited the neighbourhood and the children after eight years to document what progress they may have made in their lives. The film is produced by Informaction Productions.

By the time of East End Forever's release, Maxime Desjardins-Tremblay had become a child actor, with credits including the films The Ring (Le Ring), Mommy Is at the Hairdresser's (Maman est chez le coiffeur), Coteau rouge and 10½.

== Reception ==
Montreal Mirror, in speaking of Carole Laganière's 2003 documentary Vues de l’Est and the follow-up of L’Est pour toujours, wrote that viewers need not have seen the earlier film to be able to appreciate this later offering, "especially since Laganière weaves in moments from the original along with footage shot at intervals in the years since." They noted a similarity to Michael Apted’s Up Series of films, as the viewer sees the subjects grow before their eyes. The reviewer writes that the subjects "discuss their lives and problems with remarkable frankness," and that while the film's tone is occasionally depressing as the viewer learns that some of the subjects are repeating the patterns seen eight years earlier, the director "captures their stories with heart, leaving you wishing for a large-scale project such as Apted’s to come out of this—and hoping that these kids somehow turn out okay."

Le Cinema wrote that the film was "...touchant et révélateur, s'intitule et il rappelle au tournant le brio de plusieurs documentaires québécois," (...touching and revealing, and seen as brilliant of the several extant Quebec documentaries) and after expanding on the individuals whose lives are being documented, concluded "En espérant que la cinéaste renoue avec ses sujets dans cinq ou dix ans, un peu comme XV le fait périodiquement dans sa série «Up»" (it is hoped that the filmmaker returns to his subjects in another five or ten years, giving them the regular coverage as has Michael Apted for the subjects of the Up Series).
