= Marie-Louise Arsenault =

Canadian film director and radio host

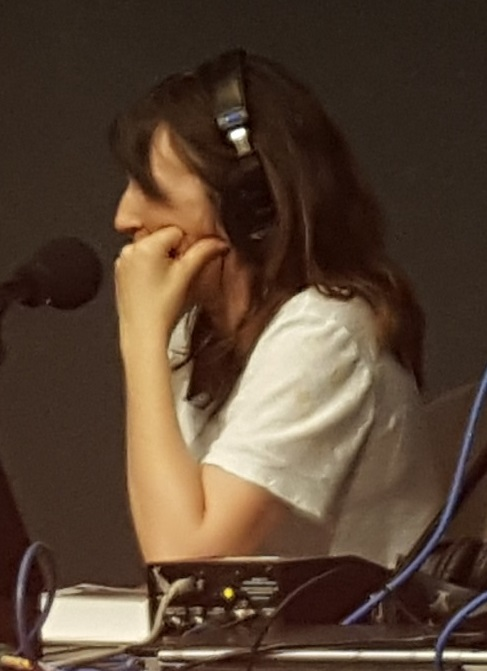

Marie-Louise Arsenault is a Canadian radio personality, who hosts the literary talk show Plus on est de fous, plus on lit ! on Ici Radio-Canada Première. In this role, she was also the moderator of the final three editions of Le Combat des livres.

A longtime arts journalist for Radio-Canada, she also previously hosted the radio programs Jamais sans mon livre and On aura tout lu, as well as the television series Écran libre for Télé-Québec, Génération T for TVA and Flash for TQS.
