= Creole Connections =

1986 film directed by Alain d'Aix

- Directed by: Alain d'Aix
- Written by: Alain d'Aix
- Produced by: Nathalie Barton
- Production companies: InformAction; with the participation of Société générale du cinéma
- Distributed by: Cinéma Libre; Films Transit Inc.
- Release date: 1986
- Running time: 52 minutes
- Country: Canada
- Languages: French; Antillean Creole

Creole Connections (French: Nous près, nous loin) is a 1986 Canadian documentary film produced by Montreal's InformAction, profiling the Creole language and culture in the Lesser Antilles. Its title comes from a song by Martinique singer Dédé Saint Prix. The film was shot in 1984 across four territories: Dominica, Guadeloupe, Martinique and Saint Lucia.

== See also ==
- Canadian films of the 1980s
