= The Fiancée of Life =

- French: La fiancée de la vie
- Directed by: Carole Laganière
- Produced by: Alain Corneau
- Cinematography: Gilbert Lemire
- Edited by: France Dubé
- Music by: Bertrand Chénier
- Production company: Les productions de la Chasse-Galerie
- Release date: 2001
- Running time: 52 minutes
- Country: Canada
- Language: French

The Fiancée of Life (French: La fiancée de la vie) is a Canadian documentary film, directed by Carole Laganière and released in 2001. Titled for a Malaysian proverb that death is the fiancée of life, the film profiles young children who are coming to terms with the deaths of parents or siblings.

The film won the Best Canadian Feature Documentary at the 2002 Hot Docs Canadian International Documentary Festival.
