= CIBL-FM =

Community radio station in Montreal

Coordinates: 45°33′34″N 73°33′07″W

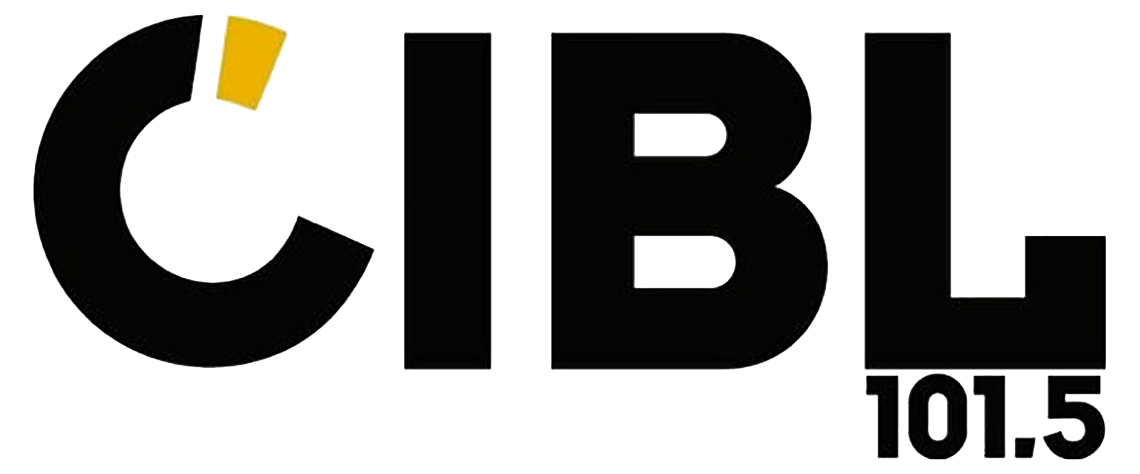
- Montreal, Quebec; Canada
- Broadcast area: Greater Montreal
- Frequency: 101.5 MHz

Programming
- Language: French
- Format: community radio

Ownership
- Owner: CIBL Radio-Montréal

History
- First air date: April 26, 1980
- Former frequencies: 104.5 MHz

Technical information
- Class: A
- Power: 872 watts (maximum ERP 2,800 watts)
- HAAT: 192.5 metres (632 ft)

Links
- Website: cibl1015.com

CIBL-FM (101.5 MHz) is a French-language community radio station located in Montreal, Quebec, Canada. It broadcasts using a directional antenna with an average effective radiated power of 872 watts and a peak effective radiated power of 2,800 watts as a Class A station.

== History ==
CIBL-FM opened on April 26, 1980. It originally operated on 104.5 MHz with 16 watts from the top of one of the pyramids of Montreal's Olympic Village. Its target audience at that time was the Hochelaga-Maisonneuve district.

Its antenna and transmitter are now located on Olympic Stadium, and its signal covers the whole city since a power increase in 1991. It is also known as a launch pad for several artists and radio personalities such as the late French language humor group Rock et Belles Oreilles and Télé-Québec's Marie-France Bazzo. One of its former general managers, Line Beauchamp, was a cabinet minister in the Jean Charest Liberal government.

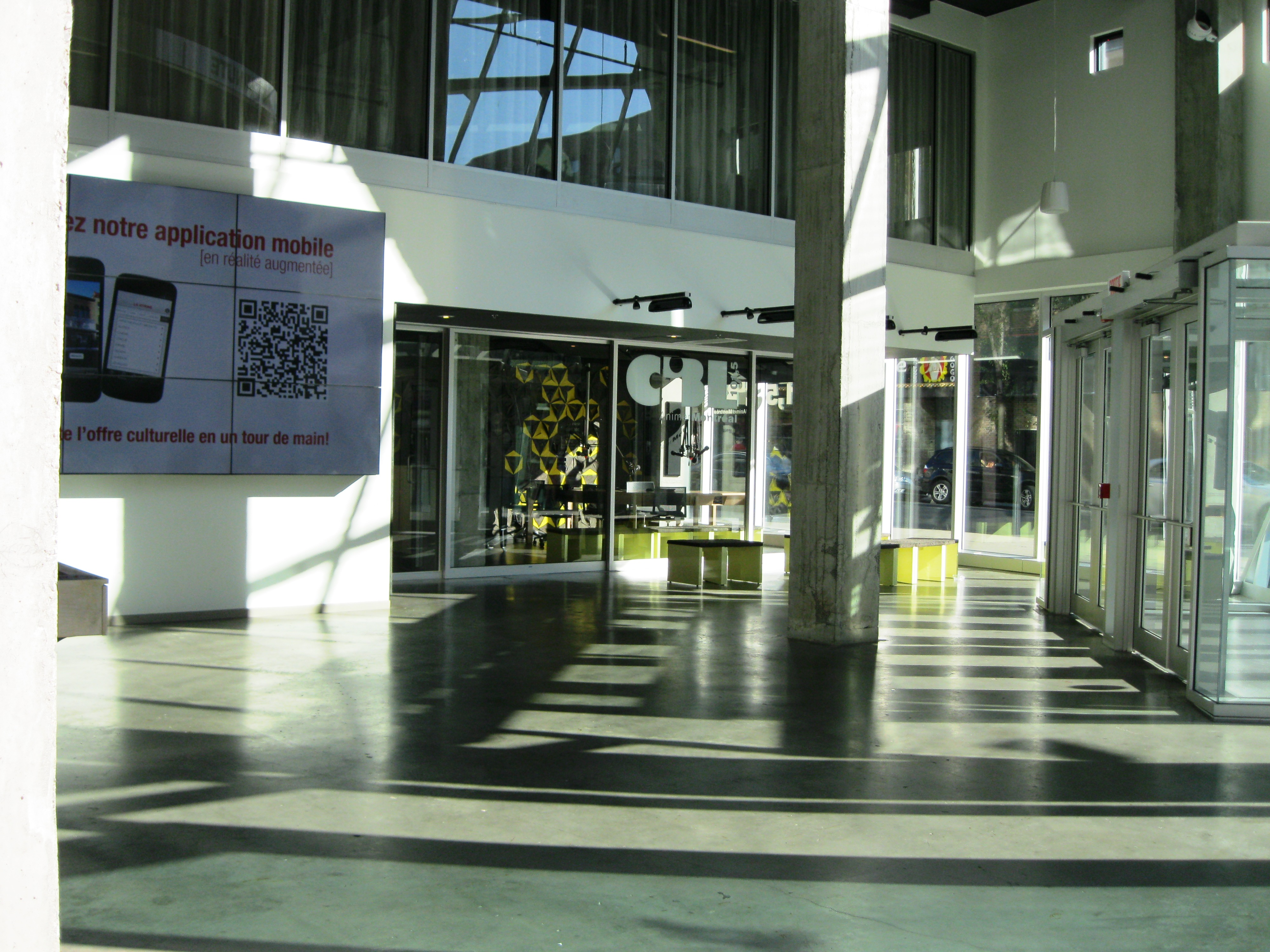
Studio in the 2-22 Ste-Catherine

In February 2012, the station moved to a new street-level studio in the 2-22 building at the corner of Saint Catherine Street and St-Laurent Street in the Quartier des Spectacles District of Montreal.

In January 2018, the station temporarily laid off all of its paid employees amid a financial restructuring effort.

The station is a member of the Association des radiodiffuseurs communautaires du Québec.
