= Mary Meigs =

Artist and writer (1917-2002)

- Born: April 27, 1917; Philadelphia, Pennsylvania, U.S.
- Died: November 15, 2002 (aged 85); Montreal, Canada
- Education: Bryn Mawr College
- Partner(s): Barbara Deming, Marie-Claire Blais

Mary Meigs (April 27, 1917 – November 15, 2002) was an American-born painter and writer.

== Early life ==
Meigs was born in Philadelphia, the daughter of Edward Browning Meigs and Margaret Wister Meigs, and grew up in Washington, D.C. Her great-great-grandfather was the obstetrician Dr. Charles Delucena Meigs, and her great-granduncle was Major General Montgomery C. Meigs, Quartermaster General of the United States Army during the American Civil War. She studied at Bryn Mawr College, graduating in 1939, and subsequently taught English literature and creative writing at that school. She served in the United States Navy's WAVES corps during World War II.

She subsequently studied art in New York City, and had her first exhibition of paintings in 1950.

== Relationships ==
Openly lesbian, Meigs met author Barbara Deming in 1954. Deming and Meigs became a couple and moved to Wellfleet, Massachusetts, where they joined a Cape Cod artistic circle that included abstract painter Mark Rothko, critic Edmund Wilson, and writer Mary McCarthy.

In 1963, Wilson introduced Meigs to Marie-Claire Blais, a writer from Quebec who became romantically involved with Meigs and had a complicated relationship with Deming. The three women lived together for six years. Meigs and Deming drifted apart, and in 1971 Meigs and Blais moved to Brittany. The couple subsequently returned to Montreal in 1976, where Meigs spent the remainder of her life.

== Writings and later life ==
In the 1970s, Meigs turned to writing, publishing books such as Lily Briscoe: A Self-Portrait (1981), The Medusa Head (1983) and The Box Closet (1987). In addition to her writing, she became a prominent spokesperson in Canada for lesbian, feminist, and seniors' issues. She died in Montreal in 2002, following a series of strokes.

Meigs was instrumental in helping administer and support The Money for Women Fund, founded by Barbara Deming to support the work of feminist artists. After Deming's death in 1984, the organization was renamed as the Barbara Deming Memorial Fund. Today, the foundation is the "oldest ongoing feminist granting agency" which "gives encouragement and grants to individual feminists in the arts (writers, and visual artists)."

== Depictions ==
Mary McCarthy's 1955 novel A Charmed Life depicts Meigs as "Dolly Lamb", a tiresome artist whose paintings were "cramped with preciosity and mannerism".

In 1990, Meigs appeared in the Canadian docudrama film The Company of Strangers. She published a book about her experiences making the film, In the Company of Strangers, in 1991.

== Publications ==
- Lily Briscoe: A Self-Portrait (1981)
- The Medusa Head (1983)
- The Box Closet (1987)
- In the Company of Strangers (1991)
- The Time Being (1997)
- Beyond Recall (2005)
