= Barbara Deming =

American feminist and advocate of nonviolent social change

- Deming photographed by Consuelo Kanaga
- Born: July 23, 1917; New York City, U.S.
- Died: August 2, 1984 (aged 67); Sugarloaf Key, Florida, U.S.
- Education: Bennington College, Western Reserve University
- Partner(s): Mary Meigs (1954–1969); Jane Verlaine (1969–1984, Deming's death)

Barbara Deming (July 23, 1917 – August 2, 1984) was an American lesbian feminist and advocate of nonviolent social change.

== Formation and early work, 1917–1945 ==
Barbara Deming was born into an "upper-middle-class" family, and raised with her three brothers in Manhattan. Her mother was Katherine Burritt, a women's suffragist who had sung professionally in her youth, and her father was Harold Simpson Deming, described by his daughter as "a well-to-do Republican lawyer" and a "very caring and principled man". Deming recognised her father as conventionally patriarchal and that she would have to escape his influence to become herself, but also considered him emotionally reliable in a way that her mother was not.

Deming attended the Friends Seminary, a Quaker school on East 16th Street, from kindergarten to the end of high school. The family lived nearby on East 19th Street and had a country retreat in then rural New City, Rockland County, where Deming was exposed to more bohemian influences thanks to the artists' colony that had developed along South Mountain Road.

From 1934 she attended Bennington College in Vermont. She graduated in 1938 with majors in English literature and drama, and returned to New York City, where she settled in Greenwich Village. At first, she seemed destined for a career in the theater. She had co-founded a stock company at Bennington, and served as its co-director in the summers of 1938 and 1939. In her senior year she was active on the fringes of Orson Welles's Mercury Theatre, and her first paid job after graduation was with the company. She also directed its apprentice group without pay. She briefly worked with another company as assistant director on a production of Shelley's The Cenci, which never found a backer.

Frustrated and disenchanted by her inability to get steady theater work, she considered a teaching career. She spent the summer of 1940 at Bennington as a teaching fellow, and accepted a scholarship from Western Reserve University (now Case Western) in Cleveland, where she completed a master's degree in drama during the academic year that followed. The disappointing program at Case Western — dominated by superficial survey courses — dampened her enthusiasm, although she did return to Bennington for a second stint as a teaching fellow in the summer of 1941.

In 1942 she got a job as a film analyst at the Museum of Modern Art, working on a project for the Library of Congress, which she held until funding ran out in 1945. Once again unemployed, Deming was obliged to move back home with her parents, as she had in the winter of 1939–1940 and would continue to do from time to time.

== Writer, 1945–1960 ==
Deming had been writing poetry since she was sixteen, and had been trying to write in other forms since she graduated from Bennington. In 1945, she decided that this would be her career. Building on what she had learned from the Library of Congress project, she continued to research the movies, and started work on what became Running Away from Myself: A Dream Portrait of America Drawn from the Movies of the Forties, the first version of which she completed in 1950. The manuscript was praised by Truman Capote (a neighbour in New City) and partly serialized in the magazine City Lights, but rejected by every publisher Deming submitted it to. It was only published — after substantial revision — in 1969.

Indeed, "most of the short stories, essays, and poetry she submitted before 1950 were rejected". As the new decade began, Deming, now in her thirties, could still write: "I have a great hunger to begin to shape a life." She did gradually build a portfolio during the 1950s, often published in lower-profile journals and magazines, many of which would prove ephemeral. She had her greatest success as a film critic, placing pieces fairly regularly, initially in the Partisan Review and later also in Vogue and The Nation. Among her more prestigious credits were a short story in The New Yorker ("A Giro") and a substantial essay on the English playwright John Osborne in The Hudson Review.

In a review of We Are All Part of One Another: A Barbara Deming Reader (1984), Deming's friend and former partner Mary Meigs loyally foregrounds the eighteen poems that are used to link the different sections of the anthology. In 1996, other friends published I Change, I Change, a selection of Deming's love poems organised into groups dedicated to the women who inspired them. Yet almost none of the poems that appeared posthumously had been accepted for publication in her lifetime.

Deming would later say that she "almost was killed as a writer in the '40s and '50s" by the struggle to break through. It is hardly surprisingly that editors of the era were not receptive to overtly lesbian themes, but even her more impersonal work found relatively few takers. A mounting pile of rejection slips obliged her to keep accepting "pink collar" jobs around New York City — including one as editorial assistant to novelist-journalist Bessie Breuer, "with whom she became very close, though Bessie could be notoriously difficult" — or to rely on the generosity of her parents and of Mary Meigs. It also left her looking for challenges elsewhere. For a time she took drawing classes with George Grosz at the Art Students League. She also began to travel: to Italy, Spain, Greece and England in 1950–1951; to Mexico in 1953; on a tour including Japan, India and Israel in 1959; and finally to Cuba in 1960 — a trip that would prove to be "the turning point" that shaped the remainder of her life.

== Activist, 1960–1984 ==
On a trip to India, she began reading Gandhi, and became committed to a non-violent struggle, with her main cause being Women's Rights. She later became a journalist, and was active in many demonstrations and marches over issues of peace and civil rights. She was a member of a group that went to Hanoi during the Vietnam War, and was jailed many times for non-violent protest.

Deming believed that it was often those whom we loved that oppressed us, and that it was necessary to re-invent non-violent struggle every day.

It is often said that she created a body of non-violent theory, based on action and personal experience, that centered on the potential of non-violent struggle in its application to the women's movement.

In 1968, Deming signed the “Writers and Editors War Tax Protest” pledge, vowing to refuse tax payments in protest against the Vietnam War.

On September 2, 1971, Deming was involved in a near-fatal car accident while driving to a conference in Georgia. She suffered serious internal injuries and for a time her vision was in peril. She spent four months in hospital and longer convalescing at home. She returned to limited activism, but her physical fragility was permanent, eventually prompting her move to Florida in 1977. "Illness holds me by the ankle," she wrote.

In 1978, she became an associate of the Women's Institute for Freedom of the Press.

=== Money for Women / The Barbara Deming Memorial Fund ===
In 1975, Deming founded The Money for Women Fund to support the work of feminist artists. Deming helped administer the Fund, with support from artist Mary Meigs. After Deming's death in 1984, the organization was renamed as The Barbara Deming Memorial Fund. Today, the foundation is the "oldest ongoing feminist granting agency" which "gives encouragement and grants to individual feminists in the arts (writers, and visual artists)".

== Relationships ==
Deming had her first serious romantic and sexual relationship at sixteen with Norma Millay, sister of Edna St. Vincent Millay, a woman her mother's age whom she had met in New City. She immediately embraced her lesbianism, writing at the time "I am a lesbian. I must face it," and a few years later in 1939, "This is not the devil. It is the devil who says this is the devil." This formative relationship lasted about a year, and Deming even confessed it to her mother, who "wasn't judgmental". Other affairs followed, including a brief one in her early twenties with Lotte Lenya. Deming experimented with heterosexuality at college, and then for a final time in her mid-thirties, in a misadventure that convinced her once and for all that "I am not the one to unteach" men their "inanity".

She had three long-term relationships. The first, beginning in the early 1940s, was with Vida Ginsberg (1920–2015), later a professor at Bard College. The second, from 1954 to 1969, was with the painter and writer Mary Meigs. Meigs was wealthier than Deming, with a comfortable private income, which gave them the freedom to pursue their political and creative interests with few financial constraints. Deming's final enduring relationship, from 1969 to 1984, was with the painter Jane Verlaine, also known as Jane Watrous Gapen.

When Deming returned to teach at Bennington in the summer of 1941, her brother Quentin (1919–2019), known as Chip, a medical student at Dartmouth College, was playing summer stock in the theatre company his sister had co-founded. So was Bennington senior Vida Ginsberg. Ginsberg was attracted to both siblings, but initially favored Barbara. The pair became lovers, and remained together — if not always under the same roof — for seven years. The relationship ended when Ginsberg belatedly fell in love with Chip, whom she married in 1949. Deming was "stunned" by this development but ultimately philosophical. Chip had always been her darling, and she remained close both to him and to Ginsberg, bonding with their daughters, and even living with them for short periods — her view on love being that "it changes, certainly; but it does not expire".

Deming met Mary Meigs while visiting Bessie Breuer in 1954. Meigs was acquainted with Mary McCarthy, and in 1953 the two women had bought adjoining properties on Pamet Point Road on the northern outskirts of Wellfleet, Massachusetts, where McCarthy's ex-husband, Edmund Wilson, also lived. McCarthy bought the larger Red House and Meigs bought the smaller Yellow House, where Deming joined her soon after they met. Meigs later bought the Red House from McCarthy, and it became the couple's home, with the Yellow House retained as a studio and cottage for visitors. In 1963 Wilson introduced Meigs to the Quebecois writer Marie-Claire Blais, a generation younger than Deming and Meigs, who was visiting Cambridge on a Guggenheim Fellowship, and the two fell in love. Blais, who came from a working-class background and did not finish high school, "could barely speak English" at this time, but Meigs was fluent in French.

By the following year Blais had moved into the Yellow House as Meigs's lover. This uneasy triangle — which included a brief affair between Blais and Deming — lasted for six years, from 1964 to 1969, with tensions kept manageable by Deming's frequent absences on political work, or by Meigs and Blais escaping to Europe, or to their cabins in the Laurentians and on the Gaspé Peninsula.

Nevertheless, by 1969 Deming was ready to move on. She had become re-acquainted with the painter Jane Verlaine, whom she had known slightly at Bennington, and the two formed a "permanent and unshakeable" bond. In the fall of 1969, Deming quit Wellfleet to live with Verlaine and her two children in an old farmhouse near Monticello, New York. In the spring of 1977 the couple moved to Sugarloaf Key, Florida, where they became part of a closeknit lesbian-feminist community, and where they lived until Deming's death. Meigs and Blais lived together "on and off" for more than twenty years, and remained close until Meigs died in 2002. They continued to embroil themselves in complicated triangular relationships, habitually appealing to Deming for sympathy and advice, which she did her best to provide.

Meigs was politically sympathetic but not a natural activist, being described by Blais as "timid" and "uncertain of herself". Verlaine, in contrast, shared both Deming's values and her engagement — she was, if anything, even more radical in her feminism, or at least more pessimistic about men ever becoming genuine allies. As well as painting, drawing and illustrating several books written by Deming, she was a tireless advocate for women who had endured male violence.

== Death ==
In March 1984 Deming was diagnosed with cancer, which had started in her ovaries and spread. After initially agreeing to treatment, she was told in June that the cancer was incurable. She went home to Sugarloaf Key so she could spend her final days among her friends. In a last note to them she wrote:

"I have loved my life so very much and I have loved you so very much and felt so blessed at the love you have given me. I love the work so many of us have been trying to do together ... but I just feel no more strength in me now and I want to die. ... I want you to know, too, that I die happily."

On July 31 she fell into a coma, dying two days later.

== Publications ==
- Prison Notes (New York: Grossman, 1966)
- "On Revolution and Equilibrium", Liberation, February 1968
  - published separately as On Revolution and Equilibrium (New York: A. J. Muste Memorial Institute, 1968)
  - reprinted in the collective manifesto Delivered Into Resistance (New Haven, CT: Catonsville Nine-Milwaukee Fourteen Defense Committee, 1969)
  - reprinted in Staughton Lynd and Alice Lynd (eds), Nonviolence in America: A Documentary History, revised edition (Maryknoll, NY: Orbis, 1995)
- Running Away from Myself: A Dream Portrait of America Drawn from the Movies of the Forties (New York: Grossman, 1969)
- Revolution and Equilibrium (New York: Grossman, 1971)
  - a selection of political writings, including the influential 1968 essay
- Wash Us and Comb Us: Stories (New York: Grossman, 1972)
- We Cannot Live Without Our Lives (New York: Grossman, 1974)
- Remembering Who We Are (Tallahassee, FL: Naiad, 1981)
- We Are All Part of One Another: A Barbara Deming Reader, edited by Jane Meyerding (Philadelphia: New Society, 1984)
- A Humming Under My Feet: A Book of Travail (London: Women's Press, 1985)
- Prisons That Could Not Hold (San Francisco: Spinsters Ink, 1985)
  - unites Prison Notes (1966) with Seneca Writings, 1984
  - reprinted with additional material as Prisons That Could Not Hold, edited by Sky Vanderlinde (Athens, GA: University of Georgia Press, 1995)
- I Change, I Change: Poems by Barbara Deming, edited by Judith McDaniel (Norwich, VT: New Victoria, 1996)
