= A Song from Faraway =

2020 novel by Deni Ellis Béchard

- First edition
- Author: Deni Ellis Béchard
- Language: English
- Published: 2020
- Publisher: Milkweed Editions
- Publication place: Canada
- ISBN: 978-1571311351

A Song from Faraway is a 2020 novel by Canadian author Deni Ellis Béchard.

Two half-brothers, Andrew and Hugh, share the same father, a man with the last name of Estrada. The two brothers are very different, the typical Cain and Abel. Neither brother really knows the past history of their father, who lived with Andrew and his mother until his death. It is upon finding and reading his papers and manuscripts (and his three published books) that they (and the reader along with them) get to know just who their father was.
