= Karim Hussain =

Canadian filmmaker and cinematographer (born 1974)

Karim Hussain (born July 16, 1975) is a Canadian filmmaker and cinematographer. As a director he is best known for his 2000 film Subconscious Cruelty, and as co-writer of Nacho Cerdà's The Abandoned. In 2006, he adapted French-Canadian writer Marie-Claire Blais' work, La Belle Bête. For it, he won the Director's Award at the Boston Underground Film Festival.

A native of Ottawa, Ontario, he is the son of writer Nancy Vickers.

== Filmography ==
=== Director ===
Films

Year	Title	Director	Writer	Notes
2000	Subconscious Cruelty	Yes	Yes	Also editor camera operator, additional makeup effects, sound editing and sound mix
2002	Ascension	Yes	Yes	Also associate producer and camera operator
2006	The Beautiful Beast	Yes	Yes	Also producer and camera operator

Short films

Year	Title	Director	Writer	Notes
2002	La dernière voix	Yes	Yes	Also producer
2011	Vision Stains	Yes	Yes	Segment of The Theatre Bizarre

=== Cinematographer ===
Films

Year	Title	Director	Notes
2000	Subconscious Cruelty	Himself	With François Bourdon
2002	Ascension	Himself	
2006	The Beautiful Beast	Himself	
2009	Walled In	Gilles Paquet-Brenner	
2010	Territories	Olivier Abbou	
2011	Hobo with a Shotgun	Jason Eisener	
2012	Antiviral	Brandon Cronenberg	
2013	L'autre monde	Richard Stanley	Documentary
2015	We Are Still Here	Ted Geoghegan	
2015	Beeba Boys	Deepa Mehta	
2015	Hyena Road	Paul Gross	
2016	Rupture	Steven Shainberg	
2016	Madame Hollywood	Olivier Abbou	
2017	Mohawk	Ted Geoghegan	
2018	Parallel	Isaac Ezban	
2018	Seven in Heaven	Chris Eigeman	
2019	Random Acts of Violence	Jay Baruchel	
2020	Possessor	Brandon Cronenberg	
2021	Seance	Simon Barrett	
2022	Firestarter	Keith Thomas	
2022	Orphan: First Kill	William Brent Bell	
2023	Infinity Pool	Brandon Cronenberg	
2024	Dark Match	Lowell Dean	
2026	Forbidden Fruits	Meredith Alloway	

Short films

Year	Title	Director	Notes
1999	Divided Into Zero	Mitch Davis	
2001	Facts Are Safety	Nicolas Debot	
2002	La dernière voix	Himself; Julien Fonfrede	
2006	Au coeur brisé	Antoinette Karuna	
2009	Dolorosa	Christophe Debacq	
2010	The Aristofrogs	Ben Bernschneider; Douglas Buck; Jan Hendrik Drevs; Arno Frisch; John A. Gallagher; Buddy Giovinazzo; Matthew Harrison	
2011	The Theatre Bizarre	Richard Stanley; Douglas Buck; Himself	Segments "The Mother Of Toads", "The Accident" and "Vision Stains"
2012	The Captured Bird	Jovanka Vuckovic	
2013	Method	Gregory Smith	
2015	Jooj: Shoulders and Whispers	Brandon Cronenberg	
2015	Whispers and Shoulders	Sook-Yin Lee	
2016	Animalia: Face On	Brandon Cronenberg	
2019	Please Speak Continuously and Describe; Your Experiences as They Come to You	Brandon Cronenberg	
