= Absences (film) =

- Directed by: Carole Laganière
- Written by: Carole Laganière
- Produced by: Colette Loumède
- Starring: Nathalie Bergeron; Ines Hajrovic; Deni Ellis Béchard
- Cinematography: Dominic Dorval
- Edited by: Aube Foglia
- Music by: Luc Sicard; Mélanie Auclair; Andrew Czerny
- Production company: National Film Board of Canada
- Release date: August 2013 (FFM)
- Running time: 74 minutes
- Country: Canada
- Language: French

Absences is a Canadian documentary film, directed by Carole Laganière and released in 2013. Based in part on Laganière's relationship with her mother, whose memory was fading due to Alzheimer's disease, the film profiles three people who are coping with the unresolved absence of loved ones from their lives, while also reflecting on her own sense of loss.

The participants are Nathalie Bergeron, a woman whose sister Marilyn went missing several years earlier and has never been found; Ines Hajrovic, a Croatian immigrant to Canada who is searching for the birth mother who abandoned her; and writer Deni Ellis Béchard, who is looking for information about his family history after having grown up in English Canada and the United States without much connection to his paternal French Canadian roots in Quebec.

The film premiered at the 2013 Montreal World Film Festival, before going into commercial release in September.

At the 2013 Quebec City Film Festival, it won the Public Prize for Canadian films.
