= A Season in the Life of Emmanuel =

1965 novel by Marie-Claire Blais

- First US English-language edition
- Author: Marie-Claire Blais
- Original title: Une saison dans la vie d'Emmanuel
- Translator: Derek Coltman
- Language: French
- Publisher: Grasset (France); Farrar, Straus and Giroux (US); Jonathan Cape (UK)
- Publication date: 1965
- Publication place: Canada
- English publication date: 1966

A Season in the Life of Emmanuel (French: Une saison dans la vie d'Emmanuel) is a French Canadian novel by Marie-Claire Blais, published in 1965.

The novel centres on a large rural farm family in Quebec headed by domineering matriarch Antoinette, and depicts their lives around the time of the birth of Emmanuel, the family's sixteenth child. The novel focuses primarily on Emmanuel's teenage siblings Pomme, Héloïse, "Septième" (Fortuné-Mathias) and Jean-Le Maigre, who are all in some state of rebellion against the family order; in its themes of moral and sexual transgression, the novel is part of the anti-terroir tradition in Quebec literature.

The novel was adapted for film by director Claude Weisz in 1972.

== Awards ==
The novel won the Prix Médicis and the Prix Jean-Hamelin in 1976.

The novel was selected for the 2008 edition of Le Combat des livres, in which it was defended by actor and director Serge Denoncourt.
