= Deni Ellis Béchard =

Canadian American writer

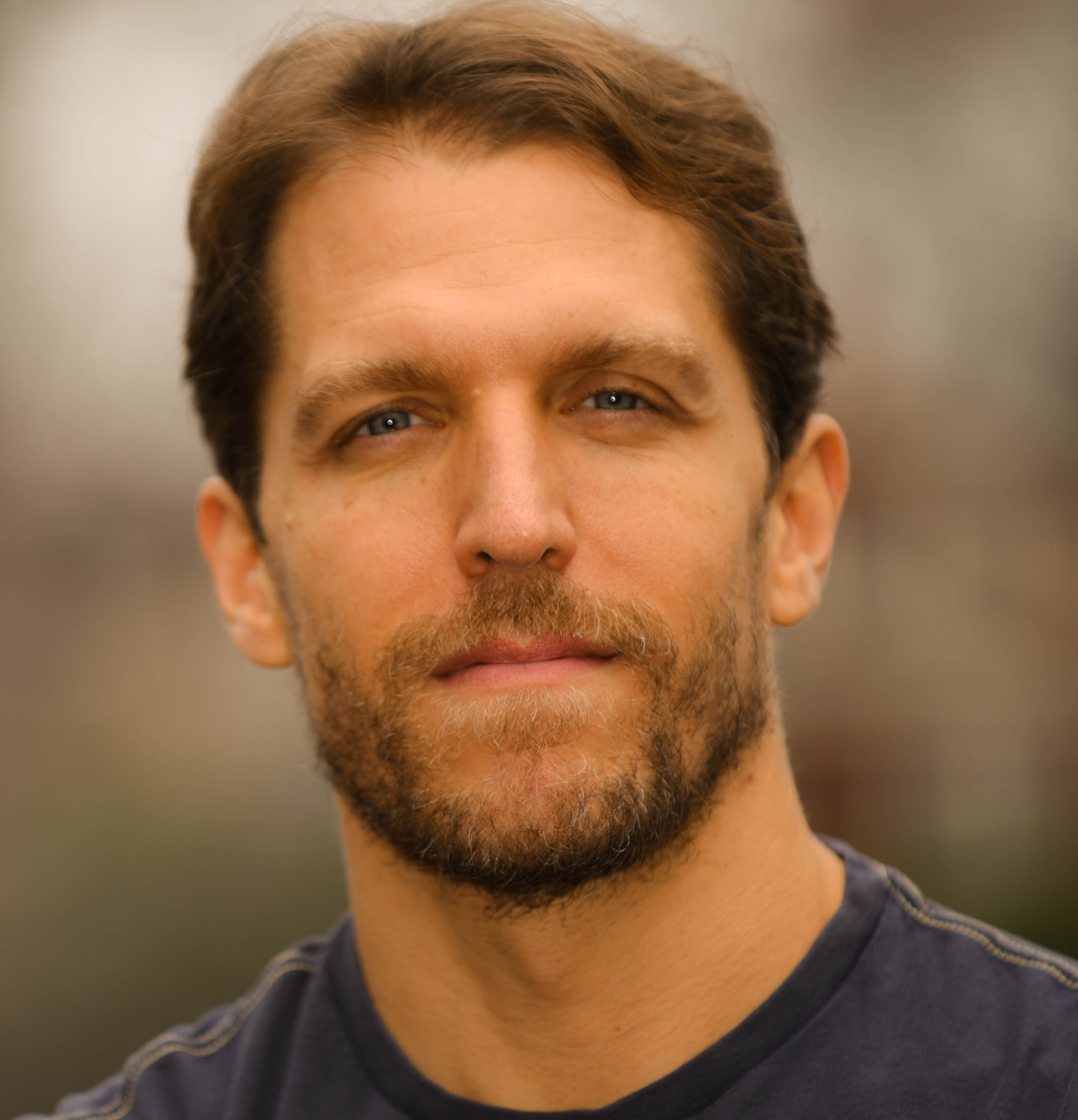
- Béchard in Cambridge, MA, December 2015
- Education: Marlboro College; Middlebury College; University of Guelph
- Writing career
- Genres: novel, journalism, memoir, photography
- Notable awards: Commonwealth Writers Prize
- Website: www.denibechard.com

Deni Ellis Béchard, also known as Deni Yvan Béchard, is a Canadian-American novelist.

His novel, Vandal Love (2006), won the 2007 Commonwealth Writers' Prize for Best First Book. It was a finalist for the 2009 Combat des livres, broadcast on Radio-Canada. His second book, Cures for Hunger, was a memoir about growing up with his father who robbed banks, and was an Amazon.ca pick for one of the best memoirs of 2012. He has written a book of journalism, Of Bonobos and Men: a Journey to the Heart of the Congo, which won the 2015 Nautilus Book Award for Investigative Journalism as well as the Nautilus Book Award Grand Prize. He coauthored Kuei: a Conversation on Racism, book about racism against First Nations People in Canada, written in epistolary form with the Innu poet Natasha Kanapé-Fontaine.

His novel Into the Sun, about the Civilian Surge in Afghanistan, won the 2017 Midwest Book Award for Literary Fiction and has been described by National Book Award-winning author Phil Klay as a "Ferociously intelligent and intensely gripping portrait of the expatriate community in Kabul." It was a CLMP Firecracker Award nominee, was long-listed for the Prix des Libraires du Québec, and was selected by Radio Canada as one of 2017's Incontournables and one of the most important books of the year to be read by Canada's political leaders. Pulitzer Prize-winning author Richard Ford has compared it to the work of Graham Greene and Robert Stone.

Béchard is also the author of White, a novel about neocolonialism in the Congo and in Canada (Foreword Indie Book of the Year Award, bronze winner); My Favorite Crime: Essays and Journalism from around the World; and A Song from Faraway, a novel that tells the story of a family's legacy in wars over two centuries and on three continents. In the San Francisco Chronicle, Anita Felicelli writes, “The novel’s brilliant innovation is its adoption of a shattered form: its structure mirrors its theme of bodies and stories ruined by wars willingly fought... Tough of mind and tender of heart, its beauty is wholly entrancing.”

== Life ==
Béchard was born to a French-Canadian father and an American mother. He describes his childhood in Cures for Hunger, beginning with the story of how his father would play a game with his two sons, parking his truck with them inside on a train track and not driving off until right before the oncoming train arrived. When Béchard was ten, his mother ran away from Canada with him and his siblings to live in Virginia. When he was almost fourteen, he learned that his father had been a bank robber, and decided to return to Vancouver to live with him, wanting to be a criminal as well. The memoir tells the story of his disillusionment with crime and his decision to pursue writing.

He graduated from Marlboro College and received graduate degrees from Middlebury College and the University of Guelph. He was French editor at The Adirondack Review.

Although in French "Deni" is normally spelled "Denis," his mother named him "Deni" because in French the ending "s" is silent and she wanted English speakers to pronounce his name correctly. His given name was Deni Yvan Béchard, but in 2015 he changed his middle name to Ellis (his mother's maiden name) because she had raised him and he wanted to honor her.

In 2013, he participated in Carole Laganière's documentary film Absences, sharing his story of searching for information about his family history in Quebec after having grown up disconnected from that part of his heritage.

He has traveled in over sixty countries and reported from India, Cuba, Rwanda, Colombia, Iraq, the Congo, and Afghanistan. He doesn't have a permanent home, though he is often in Boston, New York, and Montreal. He has been a finalist for a Canadian National Magazine Award and has been featured in Best Canadian Essays 2017. His journalism and photojournalism focus on environmental and human rights issues. He has done articles and photoessays on endangered wildlife, transgender soldiers, female vigilantes in India, dissident street art in Cuba, surveillance and the military in Afghanistan, as well as Afghan female athletes. Photos from his series on Afghan women cyclists has been reprinted in dozens of magazines, exhibited in the Canadian Museum of Human Rights, and featured in a Patagonia ad campaign for activism. In Afghanistan, he shot the video for part of a short film on Afghan women cyclists that was showcased by National Geographic. His articles, fiction, and photos have been published in newspapers and magazines around world, including the LA Times, Salon, Reuters, The Guardian, Patagonia, The Paris Review, La Repubblica, The Walrus, Pacific Standard, Le Devoir, Vanity Fair Italia, The Herald Scotland, The Huffington Post, The Harvard Review, The National Post, and Foreign Policy Magazine.

== Works ==
- Vandal Love (Doubleday Canada / Milkweed Editions, 2006) ISBN 978-0-385-66051-8
- Cures for Hunger: A Memoir (Milkweed Editions / Goose Lane Editions, 2012) ISBN 978-1-57131-331-7
- Of Bonobos and Men: A Journey to the Heart of the Congo (Milkweed Editions, 2015); also published as Empty Hands, Open Arms: The Race to Save Bonobos in the Congo and Make Conservation Go Viral (Milkweed Editions, 2013) and The Last Bonobo: A Journey to the Congo (Biblioasis, 2015)
- Into the Sun (Milkweed Editions; House of Anansi, 2016)
- Kuei: A Conversation on Racism (Écosociété, 2016; Talonbooks, 2018)
- White (Talon books, 2018)
- A Song from Faraway (2020)
- We Are Dreams in the Eternal Machine (2025)
