= Chef Thémis, cuisinier sans frontières =

- Directed by: Philippe Lavalette
- Screenplay by: Philippe Lavalette
- Produced by: InformAction
- Cinematography: Philippe Lavalette
- Edited by: Mélanie Chicoine
- Music by: Robert Marcel Lepage
- Release date: 2009
- Running time: 52 minutes
- Country: Canada

Chef Thémis, cuisinier sans frontières is a Canadian 2009 documentary film.

== Synopsis ==
Chef Thémis, the founder of the Cooks Without Borders organization, returns to his country of origin, Madagascar, to teach classes and show the underprivileged how to cook. With very few means, he manages to put together his first class, comprising eighteen people. From his enthusiasm as he starts out to his doubts when faced with the gigantic task that lies ahead of him, the film accompanies him over the three years the project lasts. Beyond their adventure, the film asks a question that any emigrant may face. Querying exile and the need to repay a moral debt to the country they left behind.

== Awards ==
- Rencontres Cinématographiques de Québec 2010
