= Waiting for Spring (2013 film) =

2013 Canadian documentary film

- French: En attendant le printemps
- Directed by: Marie-Geneviève Chabot
- Written by: Marie-Geneviève Chabot
- Produced by: Ian Oliveri; Ian Quenneville
- Cinematography: Karine van Ameringen
- Edited by: Natalie Lamoureux
- Music by: Freeworm
- Production company: InformAction
- Distributed by: Les Films du 3 mars
- Release date: February 2013
- Running time: 80 minutes
- Country: Canada
- Language: French

Waiting for Spring (French: En attendant le printemps) is a Canadian documentary film, directed by Marie-Geneviève Chabot and released in 2013. The film centres on the town of Chapais in northern Quebec, a struggling former mining community whose residents are quietly resisting the economic pressures to abandon their hometown. It focuses principally on the story of Berny, a retired former miner, and his small group of friends with whom he regularly goes ice fishing in the winter.

The film won the Prix Jutra for Best Documentary Film at the 16th Jutra Awards in 2014.
