= A Perfect Night to Go to China =

2005 novel by David Gilmour

- Author: David Gilmour
- Language: English
- Genre: Literary fiction
- Publisher: Thomas Allen Publishers
- Publication date: 2005
- Publication place: Canada
- ISBN: 978-0-88762-167-3
- OCLC: 57392755
- Dewey Decimal: 813/.54 22
- LC Class: PR9199.3.G543 P47 2005

A Perfect Night to Go to China is a 2005 novel by David Gilmour. It won the 2005 Governor General's Award for English-language fiction.
