= Subconscious Cruelty =

- DVD cover
- Directed by: Karim Hussain
- Written by: Karim Hussain
- Produced by: Mitch Davis
- Starring: Brea Asher; Ivaylo Founev; Eric Pettigrew; Christopher Piggins; Martine Viale
- Cinematography: Karim Hussain; François Bourdon
- Edited by: Karim Hussain
- Music by: Teruhiko Suzuki
- Distributed by: Albatros Film (Japan); New Select (Japan); Cinema Novo (Portugal); Infliction Films (Canada)
- Release date: October 12, 2000
- Running time: 92 min.
- Country: Canada
- Language: English
- Budget: $100,000 CAD

Subconscious Cruelty is a 2000 Canadian independent experimental anthology horror film written and directed by Karim Hussain and produced by Mitch Davis. It was filmed over a long period of time, from February 1994 to December 1999, and debuted at the Festival de Cine de Sitges in Sitges, Spain, on October 12, 2000. The film went on to screen at several other festivals, including the Stockholm International Film Festival and Amsterdam Fantastic Film Festival before being released on DVD on April 18, 2005. The film was first released in Canada on Friday, April 13, 2001. It screened at Cinema Du Parc in Montreal, Quebec, Canada for two weeks from April 13 to the 28th of 2001. The film was screened again at the same theater for a single weekend in November 2001, and for one final time in June 2003. Since then, it has not had a public screening in Canada.

== Plot ==
Subconscious Cruelty is divided into four disconnected short segments, each with its own narrative and themes:

Ovarian Eyeball

The film begins with a short sequence of a woman who dissects another woman, removing an eyeball from her belly.

Human Larvae

The sequence opens with a young man named "Brother" narrating recent events, he reveals that he is obsessed with his sister who has just become pregnant by her husband, watching the couple have sex while masturbating hidden behind a door. He says he feels a strong attraction to her and that semen is a kind of gift of creation while female menstruation is a bad joke. "Brother" begins to show a more pronounced psychotic streak when he says that his sister's pregnancy started to make him less excited about her and that he decided to do the most horrible thing in man: kill during the creation process.

During her birth, her brother helps her to have her child. As soon as the child is born, he slits its throat with a knife, dumping the blood on her face to her horror. The sister ends up bleeding to death while the brother decides to make an altar of the baby in the sink, revealing that he wrapped him in a cloth and left him to rot there. He later reveals that his sister's body has remained in place and that he sometimes sleeps next to her. The tale ends with the narrator saying that he even tried to perform necrophilia on the woman, but as she was cold and without much life, he preferred to stop for his displeasure.

Rebirth

On a grass-covered plain, several nude people writhe on the ground in an orgiastic fashion. Caressing and digging into the earth, which bleeds profusely as the group begins to perform sexual acts with the earth and nature.

Right Brain/Martyrdom

The final segment opens with a businessman driven by faith who is obsessed with masturbation and watching pornographic videos. He is plagued by an increasingly horrific nightmare, in which his doppelganger inserts four fishhooks to his penis as they are pulled. A woman's hand masturbates him while ejaculating blood all over the place, until his penis gets skinned completely. His doppelganger melts his crucifix and pours its contents into a syringe, injecting it into his forehead and presumably dying.

Elsewhere in this town, a man similar to Jesus stands naked and bleeding in front of a church, crying and begging to the occupants inside. The doors open and he is dragged into the church by three nude demonic women who proceed to torture and devour him. They force him to eat his own flesh while they do cannibalism, tear out his heart and urinate on his corpse. The trio pour wine over him alluding to the body of Christ before they start having sex with his guts, where he is already dead. The tale ends with the man being impaled through the anus by a stick, leaving the screen black afterwards.

== Cast ==
=== Ovarian Eyeball ===
- Sophie Lauzière as Woman On Slab
- Anne-Marie Belley as Hand

=== Human Larvae ===
- Brea Asher as Sister
- Ivaylo Founev as Brother
- Eric Levasseur as Lover
- Janis Higgins as Girl in Photo

=== Rebirth ===
- Nadia Simaani as Female Performer #1
- Anna Berlyn as Female Performer #2
- Nancy Simard as Female Performer #3
- Sean Spuruey as Male Performer #1
- Scott Noonan as Male Performer #2
- Mitch Davis as Male Performer #3

=== Right Brain/Martyrdom ===
- Christopher Piggins as Businessman/Doppelganger
- Martin Sauvageau as Drunk in Bar
- Annette Pankrac as Secretary
- Vince Sheffield as Man on Television
- Mitch Davis and Scott Noonan as Gloved Hands
- Karen Wiener as Female Hand
- Vainvard and Patrick Des Islets as Subliminal Bodies
- Eric Pettigrew as Martyr/Jesus Christ
- Martine Viale as Attacker/Female Demon
- Mylene Giasson as Attacker 2
- Sameera Hanif as Attacker 3

== Production ==
=== Development ===
Hussain began filming Subconscious Cruelty at the age of 19 after connecting with 22-year-old Davis, a producer whom Hussain knew to believe in the project. Hussain felt that the subculture of the mid-1990s, a time when heroin usage was prevalent and nihilism was gaining acceptance in the art world, would be accepting of his film. Influences for the film include works by Alexandro Jodorowsky, Luis Buñuel, Dušan Makavejev, David Lynch, David Cronenberg and others.

The filmmaking process was beset by various problems, including the disappearance of the film negative in a financial dispute, forcing Hussain to hand-cut the positive of the film without knowing if he would ever re-gain the negative. Another setback occurred when Hussain was stopped at the Canada–United States border after a business trip to the United States. Canadian customs officials inspected the film, and, appalled by its content, confiscated it as illegally obscene material. As a result, the original stock had to be hidden for a long period of time.

== Critical reception ==
Subconscious Cruelty received mixed reviews by mostly non-mainstream critics. Since the film was not released in the US market, traditional critics of English-language films did not see or comment on it. Known establishments such as Fangoria considered it "a film suffused with images that incite thoughts, many of which would be considered unhealthy in any artistic medium". Jon Condit of Dread Central noted that, although the film was beautifully shot, scored, and featured unsettling imagery, he felt that the film pushed the boundaries of what he called "visual metaphor" to the point where he felt it was too extreme.
