= The Heart Goes Last =

2015 novel by Margaret Atwood

- First edition cover
- Author: Margaret Atwood
- Publisher: McClelland & Stewart
- Publication date: September 14, 2015
- ISBN: 978-0385540353

The Heart Goes Last is a novel by Margaret Atwood, published in September 2015 by McClelland & Stewart in Canada, Nan A. Talese in the US and Bloomsbury in the UK. The novel is described as a "wickedly funny and deeply disturbing novel about a near future in which the lawful are locked up and the lawless roam free."

The novel is set in the same near-future dystopia as the darkly comic Byliner serial Positron which was released online.

== Plot ==
Stan and Charmaine are a married couple who are struggling to survive in a financial repression in the US. Living out of their car, Charmaine works as a waitress in a dive bar while Stan attempts to find a job. His brother Conor offers him work which Stan rejects, suspecting it is illegal. One day, Charmaine notices an ad for the Positron Project, a community located in the town of Consilience promising its inhabitants financial security and safety. Residents are required to live every other month in prison and every other month working in jobs that support the prisoners. Each couple has an "Alternate" couple who lives in their home while they are imprisoned. Alternates are prohibited from interacting with each other. Charmaine and Stan successfully apply along with Veronica and Sandi, two sex workers Charmaine met at the dive bar.

One day, she interacts with Stan's alternate, Max and the two embark on an affair. Charmaine leaves Max notes under the alias "Jasmine," one of which Stan discovers. Assuming, Jasmine is Max's partner, Stan becomes dissatisfied with his sex life and begins fantasizing about Jasmine. He places a tracker on her motorcycle and starts stalking her. He goes to their home hoping to find Jasmine. However, he discovers Max's partner is a woman named Jocelyn. She tells him Max's real name is Phil. Jocelyn discovered her husband's infidelity and forced him to live an extra month outside prison so she and Stan could get revenge on their unfaithful partners. Over the next ten weeks, Jocelyn forces Stan to watch security footage of Phil and Charmaine engaging in sexual acts and forces him into reenacting them with her.

On New Year's Day, Charmaine gets detained in prison. Aurora, a Positron employee states the computer has trouble verifying her identity. Charmaine is forced to remain imprisoned until the issued is resolved. Later, Jocelyn tells Max she was a co-founder of the Positron Project. She began the organization, hoping to improve society. However, she became disillusioned after watching the CEO Ed engage in criminal behavior including organ trafficking. Jocelyn enlists Stan to smuggle a hard drive containing scandalous information about the leaders of Positron to a journalist outside the community. She plans to have him smuggled out by faking his death. Charmaine (who is in charge of euthanizing citizens) will unknowingly inject him a lethal injection Jocelyn will replace with sedatives. Stan is assigned to a factory in charge of creating "Possibilibots," hyperrealistic sex robots intended to resemble the person a client is attracted to. Initially created to eliminate buyers' fears of sexual rejection, Possibilibots are being phased out due to the difficulty of replicating human facial features. They are being replaced with a medical operation which would brainwash recipients into losing all their memories and sexually imprinting on the first thing they see.

A contact named Budge disguises Stan as an Elvis impersonator and ships him to Las Vegas with Veronica in accompaniment. Stan spends a few weeks impersonating Elvis at a nursing home named The Ruby Slippers. He eventually meets Lucinda, a journalist to whom he gives the hard drive. Stan reunites with Conor and Budge who tell him he has one last task to complete in Lucinda's plan.

In Consilience Ed, infatuated with Charmaine, purchases a Possibilibot of her which malfunctions and injures him. He decides to put her through the operation. Ed books a flight to Las Vegas with Charmaine, Jocelyn, Phil and Aurora in tow. Before landing, Jocelyn sedates Ed and Charmaine. They are taken to Ruby Slippers in an ambulance which Conor, Budge, Stan and two of Conor security guards intercept. Charmaine, Phil (as punishment for Jocelyn for his infidelity) receive the procedure and imprint on their partners. Jocelyn subjects Ed to the operation and gives him to Lucinda to cover up her involvement in the Positron Project. Lucinda leaks the information to the public, igniting backlash against Ed and the other leader of the Positron Project's criminal actions.

Stan and Charmaine renew their wedding vows and Stan gets employed at the Possibilibots factory in Las Vegas. A year later, their daughter Winifred Stanlita is born and Charmaine becomes a housewife. Initially relieved the procedure made her imprint on Stan, she begins missing Phil to her bewilderment. On the anniversary of the renewal of their wedding vows, Jocelyn visits Stan and Charmaine and informs Charmaine she never received the operation, giving her free will over whom she chooses to love.

== Reception ==
The novel won the Red Tentacle award. Its French translation, C'est le coeur qui lâche en dernier, was selected for the 2018 edition of Le Combat des livres, where it was defended by Russell Smith.
