= East End Kids =

- French: Vues de l'est
- Directed by: Carole Laganière
- Produced by: Nathalie Barton
- Cinematography: Philippe Lavalette
- Edited by: France Pilon
- Music by: Bertrand Chénier
- Production company: InformAction
- Release date: 2004
- Running time: 52 minutes
- Country: Canada

East End Kids (French: Vues de l'est) is a Canadian documentary film, directed by Carole Laganière and released in 2004. The film profiles a group of children from the underprivileged Hochelaga-Maisonneuve area of Montreal, where Laganière herself was born, and features Laganière conversing with them about their hopes and dreams for the future.

The participating children were Valérie Allard, Jean-Rock Beauregard, Maxime Desjardins, Vanessa Dumont, Samantha Goyer, Maxime Proulx-Roy and Marianne Racine.

It was a Jutra Award nominee for Best Documentary Film at the 7th Jutra Awards in 2005.

East End Forever (L'Est pour toujours), a sequel film in which Laganière revisited the children in their teenage years, was released in 2011. Maxime Desjardins-Tremblay became an actor, with credits including the films Mommy Is at the Hairdresser's (Maman est chez le coiffeur), Coteau rouge, 10½ and Flashwood.

Following Laganière's death in 2023, the film received a special tribute screening at the Cinémathèque québécoise.
