= Vandal Love =

- Language: English
- Publisher: Doubleday Canada
- Publication date: 2006

Vandal Love is a novel by American-Canadian author D. Y. Béchard. It was first published in 2006 by Doubleday Canada.

The novel follows generations of an unusual French-Canadian family across North America, and through the twentieth century, as they struggle to find their place in the world. A family curse – a genetic trick resulting from centuries of hardship – causes the Hervé children to be born either giants or runts.

Book I of Vandal Love follows the giants’ line, exploring Jude Hervé's career as a boxer in Georgia and Louisiana in the 1960s, his escape from that brutal life alone with his baby daughter Isa, and her eventual decision to enter into a strange, chaste marriage with a much older man.

Book II traces a different kind of life entirely, as the runts of the family discover that their power lies in a kind of unifying love. François searches for years for his missing father; his own son, Harvey, flees from modern society into spiritual quests. But none of the Hervés can abandon their longing for a place where they might find others like themselves.

== Publishing history ==
- Doubleday Canada (January 17, 2006)

== Awards ==
- 2007 - Commonwealth Writers' Prize Best First Book
