= Claude Weisz =

French film director (1939–2019)

Claude Weisz (11 March 1939 – 17 August 2019) was a French film director. Weisz died on 17 August 2019, at the age of 80.

== Filmography ==
=== Feature films ===
- Une saison dans la vie d'Emmanuel (1972) with Germaine Montéro, Lucien Raimbourg, Florence Giorgetti, Jean-François Delacour, Hélène Darche, Manuel Pinto, etc.

Festival de Cannes 1973 - Quinzaine des réalisateurs

Jury Prize: Festival Jeune Cinéma 1973

- La Chanson du mal aimé (1981) with Rufus, Daniel Mesguich, Christine Boisson, Věra Galatíková, Mark Burns, Philippe Clévenot, Dominique Pinon, Madelon Violla, Paloma Matta, Béatrice Bruno, Catherine Belkhodja, Véronique Leblanc, Philippe Avron, Albert Delpy, etc.

Festival de Cannes 1982 - Perspectives du cinéma français

Competition selections: Valencia, Valladolid, Istanbul, Montréal

- On l'appelait... le Roi Laid (1987) with Yilmaz Güney (mockumentary)

Valencia Festival 1988 - Grand Prix for documentaries "Laurel Wreath"

Competition selections: Rotterdam, Valladolid, Strasbourg, Nyon, Cannes, Lyon, Cairo

- Paula et Paulette, ma mère (2005) Documentary - Straight to DVD

=== Short and mid-length ===
- La Grande Grève (1963 - Co-directed CAS collective, IDHEC)
- L'Inconnue (1966 - with Paloma Matta and Gérard Blain - Prix CNC Hyères, Sidney)
- Un village au Québec
- Montréal
- Deux aspects du Canada (1969)
- La Hongrie, vers quel socialisme ? (1975 - Nominated for best documentary - Césars 1976)
- Tibor Déry, portrait d'un écrivain hongrois (1977)
- L'huître boudeuse
- Ancienne maison Godin ou le familistère de Guise (1977)
- Passementiers et Rubaniers
- Le quinzième mois
- C'était la dernière année de ma vie (1984 - FIPRESCI Prize- Festival Oberhausen 1985 - Nomination - Césars 1986)
- Nous aimons tant le cinéma (Film of the European year of cinema - Delphes 1988)
- Participation jusqu'en 1978 à la réalisation de films "militants"

=== Television ===
- Series of seven dramas in German
- Numerous documentary and docu-soap type films (TVS CNDP)
- Initiation à la vie économique (TV series - RTS promotion)
- Contemplatives... et femmes (TF1 - 1976)
- Suzel Sabatier (FR3)
- Un autre Or Noir (FR3)
- Vivre en Géorgie
- Portrait d'une génération pour l'an 2000 (France 5 - 2000)
- Femmes de peine, femmes de coeur (FR3 - 2003)

=== Television documentaries ===
- La porte de Sarp est ouverte (1998)
- Une histoire balbynienne (2002)
- Tamara, une vie de Moscou à Port-au-Prince (unfinished)
- Hana et Khaman (unfinished)
- En compagnie d'Albert Memmi (unfinished)
- Le Lucernaire, une passion de théâtre
- Les quatre saisons de la Taillade ou une ferme l'autre
- Histoire du peuple kurde (in development)
- Les kurdes de Bourg-Lastic (2008)
- Réalisation de films institutionnels et industriels
