= Geneviève Guérard =

Canadian dancer and television presenter

Geneviève Guérard (born April 19, 1973) is a Canadian dancer and television presenter living in Quebec. She was born in La Prairie. She studied at the École supérieure de ballet du Québec. Guérard joined Les Grands Ballets Canadiens in 1992 as an apprentice; from 1999 to 2006, she was principal dancer.

She was a judge on the Radio Canada program Le Match des étoiles with Yves Desgagnés and was host for several ArTV programs, including Les dessous du cheerleading and Voulez-vous danser?.

Guérard was spokesperson for Le Défi. J'arrête, j'y gagne!, a program to help people stop smoking.

In 2013, she opened a yoga studio.
