= Christiane Charette =

Canadian broadcaster

Christiane Charette (born March 29, 1951) is a Canadian radio and television personality who hosted the national morning program on the Première Chaîne radio network from 2006 to 2011. She also previously hosted the television talk show Christiane Charette en direct for SRC Television.

The daughter of Quebec journalist Raymond Charette, she studied art history at the Université de Montréal and worked for the Montreal Museum of Fine Arts before joining Radio-Canada.

She announced on May 5, 2011 that she would be leaving the network, effective June 3, to pursue other projects.
