= Marie-Claire Blais =

Canadian writer (1939–2021)

Marie-Claire Blais CC OQ MSRC
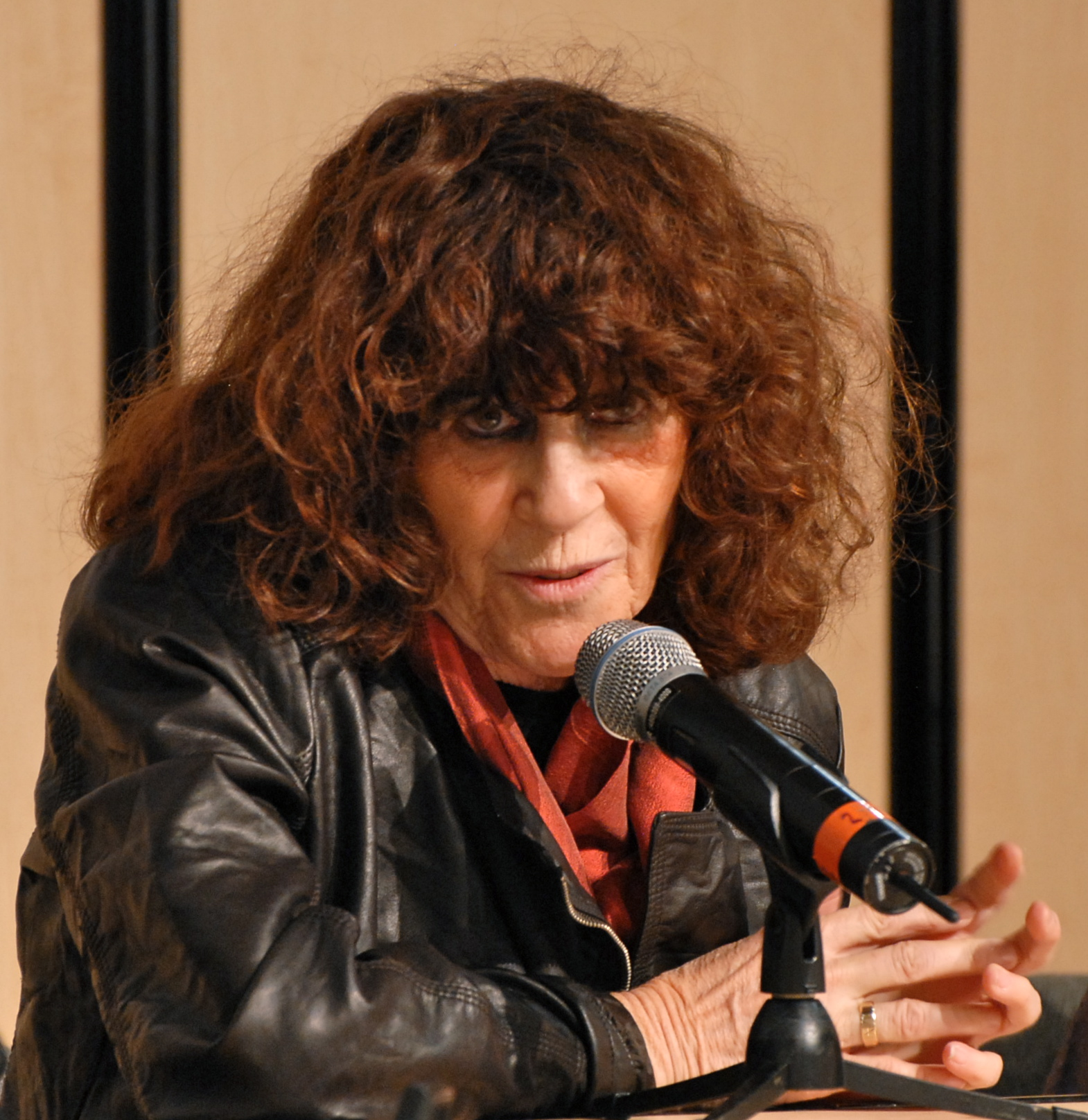
- Blais at the 2010 Montréal Book Fair
- Born: 5 October 1939; Quebec City, Quebec, Canada
- Died: 30 November 2021 (aged 82); Key West, Florida, U.S.
- Education: Université de Montréal (2002–2003), Université de Montréal (1993–1997), Université Laval
- Occupations: Author, playwright
- Writing career
- Genres: Romance, theatre, screenplay, poetry, essay
- Notable awards: Governor General's Award for French-language fiction, Guggenheim Fellowship for Creative Arts, US & Canada

Marie-Claire Blais CC OQ MSRC (5 October 1939 – 30 November 2021) was a Canadian writer, novelist, poet, and playwright from the province of Quebec. In a career spanning more than sixty years, she wrote novels, plays, collections of poetry and fiction, newspaper articles, radio dramas, and scripts for television. She was a four-time recipient of the Governor General’s literary prize for French-Canadian literature, and was also a recipient of the Guggenheim Fellowship for creative arts.

Some of her most famous works are: Mad Shadows (La Belle Bête, 1959), A Season in the Life of Emmanuel (1965), The Manuscripts of Pauline Archange (1968), Deaf to the City (1979), and the ten-volume series Soifs written between 1995 and 2018.

== Early life ==
Blais was born on 5 October 1939 into a blue collar family in Québec, the daughter of Fernando and Véronique (Nolin) Blais. She was the eldest in a family of five children. She studied at a convent school, but had to interrupt her education at the age of 15 to seek employment as a clerk and later as a typist. At the age of seventeen, she enrolled in a few classes at Université Laval, where she met professor and literary critic Jeanne Lapointe and priest and sociologist Georges-Henri Lévesque, both of whom encouraged her to write.

== Career ==
Blais published her first novel La Belle Bête (translated as Mad Shadows) in 1959, when she turned 20. She received a grant from the Canada Council of Arts which allowed her to begin writing full-time. She first moved to Paris and later moved to the United States in 1963 initially living in Cambridge, Massachusetts, then in Wellfleet, Massachusetts. She was also helped by American literary critic Edmund Wilson who introduced her to artists and writers in Cape Cod including feminist Barbara Deming and writer and painter Mary Meigs. The three lived together in Wellfleet for six years. Blais remained a longtime partner of Mary Meigs until Meigs' death in 2002.

During this time, Blais was awarded two Guggenheim Fellowships. In 1975, after two years of living in Brittany, France, she moved back to Québec. For about twenty years she divided her time between Montréal, the Eastern Townships of Québec and Key West, Florida, where she maintained her permanent home.

In 1972, she became a Companion of the Order of Canada. Many of her works have been adapted for other formats: La belle bête was made into a ballet by the National Ballet of Canada in 1977. The same book was made into a movie by Karim Hussain in 1976. Hussain won the Director's Award at the Boston Underground Film Festival for his work. Some of Blais' other works that were made into movies included Une saison dans la vie d'Emmanuel (Claude Weisz, 1973), which won the Prix de la Quinzaine des jeunes réalisateurs at the Cannes Film Festival, Le sourd dans la ville (Mireille Dansereau, 1987), which won an award at the Venice Film Festival, and L'océan (Jean Feuchère, 1971).

Blais won the Governor General's Prize in Canada for two of her novels, The Manuscripts of Pauline Archange (1968) and Deaf to the City (1979). She also wrote a 10-volume series starting with Soifs (1995) (transl. Thirstings) translated into English as These Festive Islands. The series was set in an island town modeled on Key West and featured an interlocked cast of over a hundred characters including drag queens, painters, writers, and barflies, many of them based on acquaintances that she had made on the island where she had been a part of a community that included a journalist and novelist John Hersey and poet James Merrill. The writing was based on long sentences described as 'meandering' with a combination rapidly shifting between characters' internal monologues and dialogues. The books were written in a 'stream-of-consciousness' style, with no chapters and no paragraph breaks. The last book in the 10-volume series Une réunion près de la mer was published in 2018.

She sponsored the Prix littéraire Québec-France Marie-Claire-Blais starting in 2005; awarded annually to a French author for their debut novel.

Blais enjoyed an ardent readership in French language literature and had won four Governor General's Literary Awards throughout her career. Writing in an article in a Canadian newspaper The Globe and Mail, literary critic Jade Colbert called her "the 21st century Virginia Woolf" while Quebec novelist Michel Tremblay called her "one of our greatest national treasures".

In addition to her novels, Blais has written several plays, collections of poetry and fiction, newspaper articles, radio dramas, and scripts for television. Her works had characters that included delinquent children, wayward nuns and abusive priests and included issues like white supremacy, nuclear holocaust, and the AIDS epidemic. Her books included suffering as recurring themes, though she herself had noted in an interview that she preferred serenity to suffering.

== Personal life ==
Blais was a longtime partner of American writer and painter Mary Meigs. Meigs predeceased her in 2002.

Blais died on November 30, 2021, in Key West, Florida.

== Works ==
- La Belle Bête (Mad Shadows) – 1959
- Tête blanche (White Head) – 1960
- Le jour est noir – ("The Day is Dark" in The Day is Dark and Three Travellers) 1962
- Pays voilés ("Veiled Countries" in Veiled Countries/Lives) – 1963
- Une saison dans la vie d'Emmanuel (A Season in the Life of Emmanuel) – 1965
- L'insoumise (The Fugitive) – 1966
- Les voyageurs sacrés ("Three Travellers" in The Day is Dark and Three Travellers) – 1966
- Existences ("Lives" in Veiled Countries/Lives) – 1967
- Les manuscrits de Pauline Archange (The Manuscripts of Pauline Archange) – 1968
- L'exécution (The Execution) – 1968
- Vivre! Vivre! (The Manuscripts of Pauline Archange) – 1969
- Les apparences (Dürer's Angel) – 1970
- Le loup (The Wolf) – 1972
- Un Joualonais, sa Joualonie (St. Lawrence Blues) – 1973
- Fièvre et autres textes dramatiques – 1974
- Une liaison parisienne (A Literary Affair) – 1975
- Océan suivi de murmures – 1977
- Les nuits de l'underground (Nights in the Underground) – 1978
- Le sourd dans la ville (Deaf to the City) – 1979
- Visions d'Anna ou Le vertige (Anna's World) – 1982
- Sommeil d'hiver (Wintersleep) – 1984
- Pierre, la guerre du printemps (Pierre) – 1984
- L'Île (The Island) – 1988
- L'Ange de la solitude (The Angel of Solitude) – 1989
- L'exilé; Les voyageurs sacrés (The Exile, and the Sacred Travellers) – 1992
- Parcours d'un écrivain: Notes américaines (American Notebooks: A Writer's Journey) – 1993
- Soifs series (1995–2018)
  - Soifs (These Festive Nights) – 1995
  - Dans la foudre et la lumière (Thunder and Light) – 2001
  - Augustino et le chœur de la déstruction (Augustino and the Choir of Destruction) – 2005
  - Naissance de Rebecca à l'ère des tourments (Rebecca, Born in the Maelstrom) – 2008
  - Mai au bal des prédateurs (Mai at the Predators' Ball) – 2010
  - Le jeune homme sans avenir (Nothing for You Here, Young Man) – 2012
  - Aux jardins des Acacias (The Acacia Gardens) – 2014
  - Le festin au crépuscule (A Twilight Celebration) – 2015
  - Des chants pour Angel (Songs for Angel) - 2017
  - Une réunion près de la mer - 2018
- The Collected Radio Drama of Marie-Claire Blais – 2007
- Petites Cendres ou la capture - 2020
- Un cœur habité de mille voix (Nights Too Short to Dance) - 2021
- Augustino ou l'illumination - 2022

== Awards and honours ==
- 1961: Prix de la langue-française de l’Académie française for La Belle Bête
- 1966: Prix Médicis for Une saison dans la vie d'Emmanuel
- 1966: Prix France-Québec for Une saison dans la vie d'Emmanuel
- 1969: Governor General's Award for French-language fiction for Les Manuscrits de Pauline Archange
- 1972: Companion of the Order of Canada
- 1979: Governor General's Award for French-language fiction for Le Sourd dans la ville
- 1982: Prix Athanase-David
- 1983: Prix Anaïs-Ségalas de l’Académie française for Visions d'Anna
- 1986: Fellow of the Royal Society of Canada (Academy of Arts & Humanities)
- 1988: Ludger-Duvernay Prize
- 1994: Member of the Académie des lettres du Québec
- 1995: Officer of the National Order of Quebec
- 1996: Governor General's Award for French-language fiction for Soifs
- 1999: Chevalier de l'Ordre des Arts et des Lettres du ministère de la Culture (France)
- 1999: Prix international Union latine des littératures romanes
- 2000: Grand prix Metropolis bleu
- 2000: W. O. Mitchell Literary Prize
- 2001: Nominee for the Governor General's Award for French-language fiction for Dans la foudre et la lumière
- 2002: Prix Prince-Pierre-de-Monaco
- 2005: Nominee for the Governor General's Award for French-language fiction for Augustino et le Chœur de la destruction
- 2005: Prix Gilles-Corbeil
- 2006: Matt Cohen Award
- 2008: Governor General's Award for French-language fiction for Naissance de Rebecca à l'ère des tourments
- 2009: Honorary degree (Université Laval)
- 2012: Grand prix du livre de Montréal for Le Jeune Homme sans avenir
- 2012: Honorary degree (Université de Montréal)
- 2016: Molson Prize for her body of work
- 2016: Companion of the Ordre des arts et des lettres du Québec
- 2017: Finalist for the Grand prix du livre de Montréal for Des chants pour Angel
- 2018: Grand prix du livre de Montréal for Une réunion près de la mer
- 2019: Prix de la revue Études françaises for À l'intérieur de la menace
