= Mad Shadows (novel) =

1959 novel by Marie-Claire Blais

- First edition (French)
- Author: Marie-Claire Blais
- Original title: La Belle Bête
- Translator: Merloyd Lawrence
- Language: French
- Publisher: Institut littéraire du Québec
- Publication date: 1959
- Publication place: Canada
- Pages: 182
- OCLC: 718337426

Mad Shadows (French: La Belle Bête) is a French-Canadian novel by Marie-Claire Blais, published in 1959. Writing the work at the age of twenty, the novel was Blais's first major literary work. It quickly established her as a rising talent within the Quebec literary scene.

Mad Shadows explores the psychology of a single family: Patrice, the beautiful and narcissistic son; his ugly and malicious sister, Isabelle-Marie; and Louise, their vain and uncomprehending mother. Repeatedly, the novel posits an amoral world where beauty stands hollow and love rings empty.

== Characters ==
=== Main characters ===
Isabelle-Marie
Isabelle-Marie is considered the main character of the story, as most it is revealed through her knowledge. Isabelle-Marie is the older sister of Patrice and the daughter to Louise. As the story progresses, the audience sees Isabelle-Marie’s continuing resentment for her mother’s neglect and jealousy of her brother's beauty fester and grow to become a component of her destructive nature.
Patrice
Patrice has great physical beauty, which is often likened to the Greek god Adonis. He is extremely simple-minded and an idiot and cannot think for himself. He depends solely on the constant attention of his mother and feeds his narcissism from her dedication to protecting his appearance. "Lying on his back like a marble god, pale, with his mouth half open, Patrice stared at his mother. Louise suddenly felt lacerated and oppressed."
Louise
Louise is the mother of both Patrice and Isabelle-Marie. Patrice’s beauty was to her but a reflection of her own. She attempts to preserve her own beauty in the face of Patrice's but neglects Isabelle-Marie because of her belief that only the beautiful reflect status.

=== Minor characters ===
Lanz
Lanz is the suitor and eventually the husband to Louise and becomes Isabelle-Marie and Patrice’s stepfather. Louise is originally attracted to him because of his beauty and wealth, the two highest assets within the morals of the characters.
Michael
Originally blind from a cat injury at the age of 10, Michael becomes the lover of Isabelle-Marie but soon abandons his new wife and daughter after his sight is restored since he realizes their true ugliness.
Anne
Anne appears midway through the novella and is Michael and Isabelle-Marie's daughter. Because of her ugliness, Isabelle-Marie cannot bear to see her own child as it is a reminder of the happy past with Michael that turned sour. She is not a critical character in bringing the plot forward with her actions but more a symbol of the possibility of innocence. As the story comes to a close, she is the only one to remain uncorrupt throughout the story.

== Plot ==
La Belle Bête starts off as the three main characters return home on a train. Immediately, their relationships with one another, as well as their physical beauty as a status, are established. As they return home, their daily activities reveal even more of their living situation with one another, as Isabelle-Marie is the Cinderella of the family, works hard, and is neglected. Louise fawns over her beloved beautiful Patrice, who is so incompetent from his constant dependence on his mother that he can do nothing but accept her attention. Eventually, Louise announces that she needs to travel to pick up farm equipment for their vast land and leaves Patrice and Isabelle-Marie. Isabelle-Marie continues her distaste for her brother, and as her mother is no longer there to support Patrice, she takes the opportunity to let him starve to release her anger and jealously towards him. As she grows to pity his incompetence and dependency on Louise, Isabelle-Marie begins to care for him ever so slightly.

When Louise returns, she brings with her Lanz, who becomes the new controlling figure over the family. Patrice rejoices and cleaves to his mother, who, however, can no longer respond with her attention as she is consumed by her own relationship with Lanz. As Lanz brings Louise further and further from her children, Patrice spirals into deterioration, and Isabelle-Marie relishes her new freedom. As Isabelle-Marie becomes more upbeat, she learns to care for Patrice and meets her lover, Michael, whom she convinces to love her by lying about her beauty.

From here the story splits into two. On one side of life, Isabelle-Marie begins her life with the blind Michael, and Patrice is continued to be neglected as Lanz demands the attention of Louise. Both children's stories end in despair, as Michael eventually regains his vision and comes to terms with the ugliness of Isabelle-Marie and consequently their newborn child, Anne. He abandons both of them and disappears from their lives. As the torn spirit of Isabelle-Marie returns to her unwanted home, she finds that Louise is being controlled by Lanz and has chosen him over Patrice.

Her newfound anger towards outer beauty drives her to push Patrice's face into a pot of boiling water, thus bringing his beast-like face to her lowly status. Patrice cries to his mother, who makes the ultimate choice to live her life with Lanz and to abandoning Patrice entire. Patrice is sent to an insane asylum by Louise, who becomes fed up with his incompetence, but he soon escapes shortly. As their lives quickly become disillusioned, Isabelle-Marie ends up setting fire to the farm. Louise, who has slowly been cracking under the loss of her beautiful child and the control and eventual death of her husband, is lost in the fire. In the end, Isabelle-Marie pushes Anne away and walks to the track with the intention of suicide. Patrice, however, drowns himself when he wants to find his beautiful face in the lake.

== Adaptations ==
In 1977, the novel was adapted into a ballet by the National Ballet of Canada, starring dancers Mavis Staines, Veronica Tennant, and choreographed by Anne Ditchburn, with music by Andre Gagnon. In 1987, commemorating the company's 35th anniversary, the show was rerun and featured Cynthia Lucas and Tomas Schramek.

In 2006, Karim Hussain adapted the work into the film The Beautiful Beast (La Belle Bête).
