= David Gilmour (writer) =

Canadian novelist, journalist and film critic (born 1949)

- Born: December 22, 1949 (age 76); London, Ontario
- Education: University of Toronto
- Occupations: Academic, novelist, former broadcaster
- Spouse(s): Anne Mackenzie 1980–1984, divorced Maggie Huculak 1985-? Tina Gladstone ?-present
- Children: 2

David Gilmour (born 22 December 1949) is a Canadian fiction novelist, former television journalist, film critic, and former professor at the University of Toronto.

== Early life ==
Gilmour was born in London, Ontario, and later moved to Toronto for schooling. He is a graduate of Upper Canada College and the University of Toronto.

He became managing editor of the Toronto International Film Festival in 1980 and held the post for four years. In 1986, he joined CBC Television as a film critic for The Journal, eventually becoming host of the program's Friday night arts and entertainment show. In 1990, he began hosting Gilmour on the Arts, an arts show series on CBC Newsworld.

== Career ==
He left CBC in 1997 to concentrate on his writing. His 2005 novel A Perfect Night to Go to China won the 2005 Governor General's Award for English fiction, and was longlisted for the 2007 International Dublin Literary Award.

In June 2007, Gilmour won two gold National Magazine Awards for his essay "My Life with Tolstoy" which appeared in The Walrus magazine.

Gilmour was a Professor of Literary Studies at Victoria College at the University of Toronto and taught Creative Writing and Literature from 2007 to 2021, during which time he provoked student-led protests when he told a Hazlitt reporter "When I was given this job, I said that I would only teach the people that I truly, truly love. And, unfortunately, none of those happen to be Chinese, or women ... I say I don't love women writers enough to teach them, if you want women writers, go down the hall. What I'm good at is guys… Very serious heterosexual guys."

== Novels ==
- Back on Tuesday (1986)
- How Boys See Girls (1991)
- An Affair with the Moon (1993)
- Lost Between Houses (1999)
- Sparrow Nights (2001)
- A Perfect Night to Go to China, Thomas Allen Publishers (2005)
- The Perfect Order of Things, Thomas Allen Publishers (2011)
- Extraordinary, Patrick Crean Editions (2013) (longlisted for the 2013 Scotiabank Giller Prize)

== Memoir ==
- The Film Club, Thomas Allen Publishers (2007)
