= Carole Laganière =

Canadian film director (1959–2023)

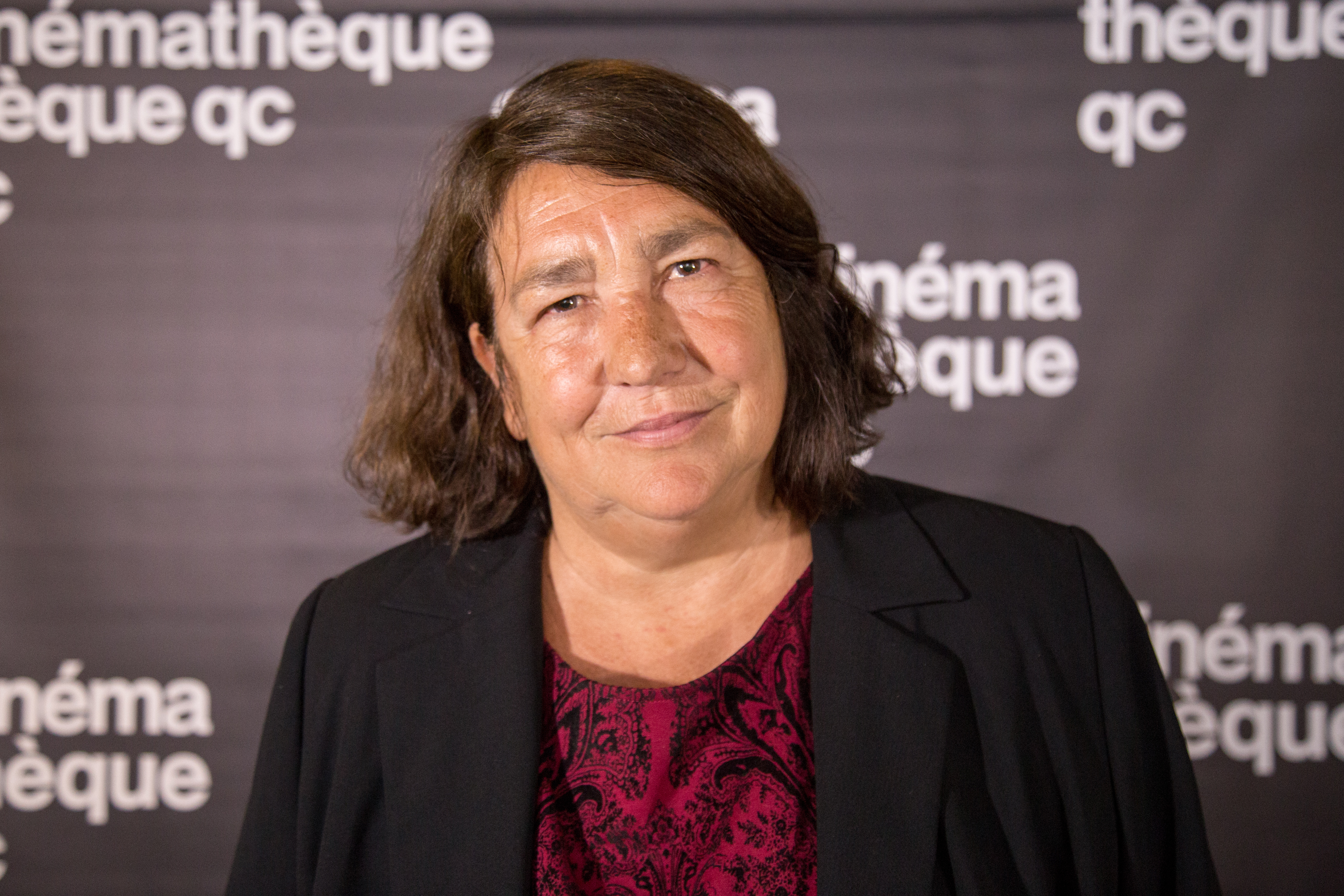
- Born: 1959; Montreal, Quebec, Canada
- Died: February 6, 2023
- Occupation: documentary film director
- Years active: 1980s-2020s

Carole Laganière (1959 - February 6, 2023) was a Canadian film director from Quebec. Although she made a number of short and feature-length narrative fiction films through her career, she was known principally as a director of documentary films.

== Life and career ==
Born and raised in the Hochelaga-Maisonneuve quarter of Montreal, she studied film at the Institut national supérieur des arts du spectacle et des techniques de diffusion in Belgium. After making two short films she made her full-length debut with the film Aline in 1992, and turned to documentary filmmaking while teaching at the Université du Québec à Chicoutimi. Her filmmaking career consisted almost entirely of documentary films afterward, except for a brief return to narrative filmmaking with the 2018 short film Uncertain Spring (Un printemps incertain).

She became best known for East End Kids (Vues de l'est) and its sequel East End Forever (L'Est pour toujours), in which she profiled the hopes and dreams of young kids growing up in the same Hochelaga-Maisonneuve neighbourhood where she had been raised. Her other noteworthy films included The Fiancée of Life (La fiancée de la vie), a film about children coping with the deaths of parents which won the Best Canadian Feature Documentary award at the 2002 Hot Docs Canadian International Documentary Festival, and Absences, about her own mother's battle with Alzheimer's disease and other people coping with the unresolved absence of family connections from their lives.

In 2015, five of her films were screened in a special retrospective program at Hot Docs.

Her final film, Break Free (Fuir), about women escaping domestic violence, premiered at the Rendez-vous Québec Cinéma in 2022.

== Filmography ==
- Le Mouchoir de poche - 1987
- Le Jour de congé - 1989
- Aline - 1992
- Histoires de musées - 1996
- Des mots voyageurs - 1997
- The Fiancée of Life (La fiancée de la vie) - 2001
- The Moon and the Violin (Un toit, un violon, la lune) - 2003
- East End Kids (Vues de l'est) - 2004
- Country - 2006
- City Park, A Little Music for the Soul (Parc Lafontaine, petite musique urbaine) - 2006
- My Park, My Plains (Mon parc, mes plaines) - 2008
- Year One (Première année) - 2010
- East End Forever (L'Est pour toujours) - 2011
- Absences - 2013
- Los Adioses - 2015
- Uncertain Spring (Un printemps incertain) - 2015
- Quartiers sous tension - 2017
- Sylvie à l’école - 2018
- Guillaume - 2019
- Break Free (Fuir) - 2022

== Awards ==
Award	Date of ceremony	Category	Work	Result	Ref(s)
Hot Docs Canadian International Documentary Festival	2002	Best Canadian Feature Documentary	The Fiancée of Life (La fiancée de la vie)	Won	
Hot Docs Canadian International Documentary Festival	2003	Best Canadian Short or Mid-Length Documentary	The Moon and the Violin (Un toit, un violon, la lune)	Won	
Jutra Awards	2005	Best Documentary Film	East End Kids (Vues de l'est)	Nominated	
Quebec City Film Festival	2013	Public Award, Canadian Film	Absences	Won	
