= The Film Club =

2007 book by David Gilmour

- Author: David Gilmour
- Language: English
- Genre: Non-fiction
- Publisher: Thomas Allen Publishers
- Publication date: September 2007
- Publication place: Canada
- Pages: 264 pages
- ISBN: 978-0-88762-285-4
- OCLC: 141842386

The Film Club is a non-fiction book by Canadian writer David Gilmour. It is a memoir of himself letting his teenage son (Jesse Gilmour) drop out of high school under the stipulation that he must watch three films a week. It was first published by Thomas Allen Publishers in September 2007.

== Plot ==
David Gilmour allowed his 15-year-old son Jesse to stop going to school without getting a job under the condition that they watch three films each week together. They go by their film schedule for three years while discussing them with each other. During this time, Jesse has trouble with the influence of drugs and his girlfriend. By the book's completion, Gilmour works harder and Jesse tries to live successfully.

== Films ==
The films that David Gilmour watches with his son includes Citizen Kane, Showgirls, Pulp Fiction, Last Tango in Paris, The 400 Blows, Ran, Singin' in the Rain, The Exorcist and Basic Instinct. Gilmour's rationale for the varied film genres is that it gives his son some education.

== Release ==
The Film Club has been translated into 24 languages. The memoir sold well in Germany, Brazil, and Canada. The book's popularity helped him become Pelham Edgar Visiting Professor of Literary Studies at the University of Toronto. He has said that if he would send his best work to Mars, it would be The Perfect Order of Things.

== Reception ==
Gregory Kirschling of Entertainment Weekly gave the book an A−, saying "Gilmour's a clear, breezy writer, and his book's got a lot of heart; ultimately, it becomes subtly affecting." Pat Saperstein of Variety said that Gilmour's idea is "a fascinating experiment – especially for parents of teens going through similar struggles – and mostly engaging, albeit a tad self-involved". Heather Harris of Metro Times said that the memoir has many strengths in relation to family.
