= List of Canadian women writers in French =

This is a list of Canadian women writers in French who were born in Canada or whose writings in French are closely associated with that country.

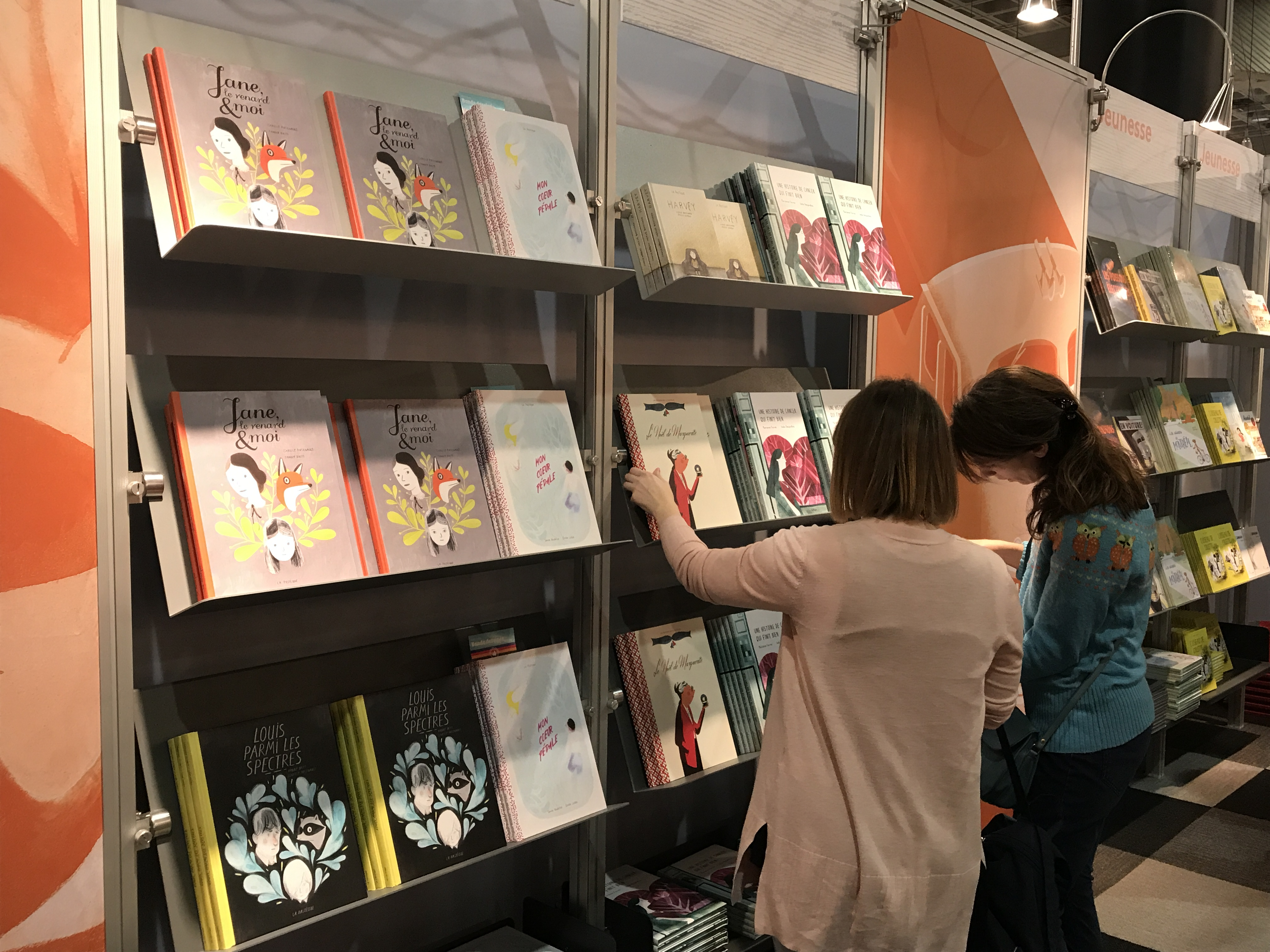
Stand at the Salon du Livre de Montréal (2017)

It was in the mid-19th century that French-speaking women began to contribute to Canadian literature, partly as a result of growing Quebec patriotism but also because of the influence of the Catholic church and developments in education. Early contributors include the novelists Laure Conan and Gabrielle Roy and the poet Blanche Lamontagne-Beauregard. Women's greatest contribution has however been since the 1960s and above all since the 1980s, triggered by increased interest in feminism. Some sources have pointed to significant differences between English-Canadian and French-Canadian literature, resulting in part from the protected language identity of the Province of Quebec where French-language radio and television and pop-stars reinforce its insularity.

== A ==
- Marie-Célie Agnant (born 1953), poet, novelist and children's writer
- Francine Allard (born 1949), educator, novelist, poet and visual artist
- Geneviève Amyot (1945–2000), poet and novelist
- Linda Amyot (born 1958), novelist, short story writer, children's writer
- Marguerite Andersen (1924–2022), German-born French-language poet and editor
- Maryse Andraos (born 1988), novelist
- Ginette Anfousse (born 1944), writer and illustrator of children's books
- Nelly Arcan (1973–2009), novelist
- Suzanne Aubry (born 1956), novelist, scriptwriter, playwright
- Aude, pen name of Claudette Charbonneau-Tissot (1947–2012), novelist, short story writer, children's writer

== B ==
- Robertine Barry (1863–1910), journalist and publisher
- Angèle Bassolé-Ouédraogo (born 1967), Ivorian-born poet and journalist
- Estelle Beauchamp (fl. from 1995), novelist
- Jacqueline Beaugé-Rosier (1932–2016), Haitian-born Canadian educator and writer
- Germaine Beaulieu (born 1949), poet and novelist
- Nicole Bélanger (born 1962), novelist and screenwriter
- Jovette Bernier (1900–1981), journalist and poet
- Louky Bersianik, pen name of Lucille Durand, (1930–2011), novelist
- Claudine Bertrand (born 1948), educator and poet
- Charlotte Biron (born 1990), novelist
- Lise Bissonnette (born 1945), writer and journalist
- Marie-Claire Blais (1939–2021), novelist, poet and playwright
- Virginie Blanchette-Doucet (born 1989), novelist
- Lise Blouin (born 1944), educator and novelist
- France Boisvert (born 1959), educator and writer
- Louise Bombardier (born 1953), actress and writer
- Monique Bosco (1927–2007), Austrian-born Canadian journalist and writer
- Mylène Bouchard (born 1978), novelist and non-fiction writer
- Lise Bourbeau (born 1941), writer of self help books
- Lysette Brochu (born 1946), novelist and short story writer
- Hélène Brodeur (1923–2010), educator, journalist and writer
- Nicole Brossard (born 1943), poet and novelist
- Chrystine Brouillet (born 1958), novelist
- Françoise Bujold (1933–1981), poet, radio playwright, artist and publisher

== C ==
- Chantal Cadieux (born 1967), playwright, novelist and screenwriter
- Catherine Chandler (born 1950), poet and translator
- Lisa Carducci (born 1943), poet, short story writer and novelist
- Claudine Chatel (born 1951), actress and writer
- Évelyne de la Chenelière (born 1975), playwright and actress
- Adrienne Choquette (1915–1973), journalist, editor, novelist, short story writer
- Andrée Christensen (born 1952), educator, editor, poet and novelist
- Stéfanie Clermont (born 1988), poet, novelist
- Anne Élaine Cliche (born 1959), novelist, essayist
- Yolande Cohen (born 1950), historian
- Daria Colonna (born 1989), poet
- Laure Conan, pen name of Marie-Louise-Félicité Angers, (1845–1924), first French-Canadian novelist
- Héloïse Côté (born 1979), fantasy novelist, academic
- Reine-Aimée Côté (born 1948), teacher, novelist
- Maya Cousineau Mollen (born 1975), poet
- Arlette Cousture (born 1948), historical fiction writer
- Gracia Couturier (born 1951), educator, children's writer, novelist and playwright

== D ==
- Francine D'Amour (born 1946), educator, novelist
- France Daigle (born 1953), novelist and playwright
- Anne Dandurand (born 1953), novelist and actress
- Diane-Monique Daviau (born 1951), educator, writer, translator and journalist
- Carole David (born 1955), poet and novelist
- Caroline Dawson, (1979–2024), novelist and poet
- Claire Dé, pen name of Claire Dandurand, (born 1953), short story writer, playwright and novelist
- Corinne De Vailly (born 1959), French-born Canadian novelist, children's writer
- Monique Deland (born 1958), educator, journalist and poet
- Jeanne-Mance Delisle (born 1939 or 1941), playwright
- Denise Desautels (born 1945), poet and playwright
- Martine Desjardins (born 1957), novelist
- Roxane Desjardins (born 1991), writer, editor
- Sylvie Desrosiers (born 1954), novelist, screenwriter
- Aurore Dessureault-Descôteaux (1926–2015), playwright
- Hélène Dorion (born 1958), poet, novelist, essayist
- Christiane Duchesne (born 1949), researcher, educator, illustrator, translator and novelist
- Louise Dupré (born 1949), journalist, educator, poet, playwright and novelist

== E ==
- Gloria Escomel (born 1941), Uruguayan-born Canadian educator, novelist and playwright

== F ==
- Abla Farhoud (1945–2021), Lebanese-born Canadian playwright and novelist
- Jocelyne Felx (born 1949), literary critic and writer
- Madeleine Ferron (1922–2010), novelist
- Naomi Fontaine (born 1987), novelist
- Dominique Fortier (born 1972), novelist and translator
- Arlette Fortin (1949–2009), novelist
- Danielle Fournier (born 1955), educator, poet, novelist and essayist
- Christiane Frenette (born 1954), educator, poet and novelist

== G ==
- Madeleine Gagnon (1938–2026), educator, literary critic and novelist
- Karoline Georges (born 1970), novelist, short story writer, poet and children's writer
- Mylène Gilbert-Dumas (born 1967), novelist
- Gabrielle Gourdeau (1952–2006), literary critic, novelist
- Germaine Guèvremont (1893–1968), journalist, novelist

== H ==
- Hélène Harbec (born 1946), poet, novelist
- Pauline Harvey (born 1950), novelist
- Valérie Harvey (born 1979), writer and sociologist
- Anne Hébert (1916–2000), poet, novelist, short story writer and playwright
- Nicole Houde (1945–2016), novelist and short story writer
- Céline Huyghebaert, novelist

== J ==
- Suzanne Jacob (born 1943), novelist, poet, playwright, singer-songwriter and critic

== K ==
- Hélène Koscielniak (fl. from 2007), novelist

== L ==
- Carole Labarre (born 1966), novelist
- Andrée Laberge (born 1953), novelist
- Marie Laberge (born 1950), actress, educator, poet and playwright
- Marie-Sissi Labrèche (born 1969), screenwriter, novelist
- Chloé LaDuchesse, poet
- Claire de Lamirande (1929–2009), novelist, literary critic
- Michèle Laframboise (born 1960), science fiction writer and comics artist
- Claire de Lamirande (1929–2009), novelist and literary critic
- Blanche Lamontagne-Beauregard (1889–1958), early Quebec poet
- Tania Langlais (born 1979), poet and educator
- Claudia Larochelle (born 1978), journalist, radio host, columnist and novelist
- Monique LaRue (born 1948), novelist, short story writer and essayist
- Mona Latif-Ghattas (1946–2021), Egyptian-born Canadian novelist, poet and short story writer
- Marie-Renée Lavoie (born 1974), novelist
- Louise Leblanc (born 1942), educator, novelist, screenwriter
- Perrine Leblanc (born 1980), novelist
- Rachel Leclerc (born 1955), poet and novelist
- Françoise Lepage (1945–2010), educator, non-fiction writer and children's writer
- Anne Legault (born 1958), actress, playwright and educator
- Catherine Leroux (born 1979), novelist, short story writer
- Marguerite Lescop (1915–2020), novelist

== M ==
- Louise Maheux-Forcier (1929–2015), novelist
- Michèle Mailhot (1932–2009), novelist
- Andrée Maillet (1921–1995), short story writer, poet and novelist
- Antonine Maillet (1929–2025), novelist and playwright
- Jovette Marchessault (1938–2012), novelist, poet, playwright, painter and sculptor
- Michèle Marineau (born 1955), novelist and translator
- Suzanne Martel (1924–2012), journalist, novelist and children's writer
- Claire Martin (1914–2014), short story writer, novelist, autobiographer
- Carole Massé (born 1949), poet, novelist
- Marie-Sœurette Mathieu (1949–2023), Haitian-born Canadian teacher, poet and novelist
- Catherine Mavrikakis (born 1961), novelist
- Julie Mazzieri (born 1975), novelist and translator
- Stéfani Meunier (born 1971), novelist and short story writer
- Andrée A. Michaud (born 1957), novelist and playwright
- Pauline Michel (born 1944), novelist, poet, playwright, songwriter and screenwriter
- Hélène Monette (1960–2015), poet
- Madeleine Monette (born 1951), poet, novelist, short story writer and essayist

== N ==
- Yvette Naubert (1918–1982), playwright and novelist
- Francine Noël (born 1945), playwright and novelist

== O ==
- Madeleine Ouellette-Michalska (born 1930), novelist, essayist and diarist
- Francine Ouellette (born 1947), novelist
- Hélène Ouvrard (1938–1999), playwright, novelist, poet and short story writer

== P ==
- Suzanne Paradis (born 1932), poet and novelist
- Alice Parizeau (1930–1990), Polish-born Canadian novelist
- Aline Poulin (1965–2011), poet and novelist
- Francine Pelletier (born 1959), science fiction novelist and short story writer
- Hélène Pelletier-Baillargeon (1932–2025), journalist, essayist, and biographer
- Maryse Pelletier (born 1946), actress, playwright and novelist
- Stéphanie Pelletier (born 1980), short story writer, novelist
- Geneviève Pettersen (born 1982), novelist
- Emmanuelle Pierrot (born 1994), novelist
- Michèle Plomer (born 1965), novelist, children's writer, translator
- Anique Poitras (1961–2016), novelist
- Marie-Hélène Poitras (born 1975), novelist and journalist
- Gabrielle Poulin (1929–2015), novelist, short story writer and poet
- Monique Proulx (born 1952), novelist, short story writer and screenwriter

== Q ==
- Judy Quinn (born 1974), poet and novelist
- Pascale Quiviger (born 1969), poet, novelist and essayist

== R ==
- Bernadette Renaud (born 1945), novelist and young people's writer
- Thérèse Renaud (1927–2005), actress, poet and novelist
- Aurélie Resch (born 1971), travel writer, poet, novelist and short story writer
- Hélène Rioux (born 1949), novelist and translator
- Dominique Robert (born 1957), poet, novelist and short story writer
- Suzanne Robert (1948–2007), novelist, short story writer
- Régine Robin (1939–2021), novelist and non-fiction writer
- Esther Rochon (born 1948), novelist, science fiction writer
- Maryse Rouy (born 1951), French-born novelist
- Gabrielle Roy (1909–1983), influential novelist, educator, autobiographer

== S ==
- Anne-Marie Saint-Cerny (born 1954), novelist, non-fiction writer and politician
- Annette Saint-Pierre (1925–2026), educator, novelist and publisher
- Marie Savard (1936–2012), poet and radio scriptwriter
- Jocelyne Saucier (born 1948), novelist and journalist
- Dominique Scali (born 1984), journalist and novelist
- Aki Shimazaki (born 1954), Japanese-born translator and novelist
- Louise Simard (born 1950), novelist

== T ==
- Olivia Tapiero (born 1990), novelist
- France Théoret (born 1942), feminist, poet, novelist, playwright and essayist
- Marie José Thériault (born 1945), poet, novelist, performer and translator
- Kim Thúy (born 1968), Vietnamese-born Canadian novelist
- Lola Lemire Tostevin (born 1937), poet, novelist and feminist writer
- Lise Tremblay (born 1957), novelist and educator
- Clarisse Tremblay (1951–1999), poet
- Danielle Trussart (born 1948), visual artist, novelist and children's writer
- Élise Turcotte (born 1957), novelist and educator
- Roxane Turcotte (born 1952), children's and youth literature writer

== V ==
- Hélène Vachon (born 1947), children's writer, novelist
- Lise Vaillancourt (born 1954), playwright, novelist
- Christine Dumitriu Van Saanen (1932–2008), Romanian-born French language poet and essayist
- Mélissa Verreault (born 1983), novelist, short story writer and translator
- Nancy Vickers (born 1946), novelist and poet
- Yolande Villemaire (born 1949), short story writer, novelist and poet
- Élisabeth Vonarburg (born 1947), French-born Canadian science fiction writer and novelist

== W ==
- Audrée Wilhelmy (born 1985), novelist

== Y ==
- Ying Chen (born 1961), Chinese-born Canadian novelist

== See also ==
- Canadian literature
- Quebec literature
- Lists of Canadian writers
