= List of writers from Quebec =

This is a list of authors from the Canadian province of Quebec.

== A ==
- José Acquelin
- Hoda Adra
- Donald Alarie
- Francine Allard
- Ginette Anfousse
- François-Réal Angers
- Emmanuel Aquin
- Hubert Aquin
- Nelly Arcan
- Gilles Archambault
- Olivar Asselin
- Bernard Assiniwi
- Aude
- Edem Awumey

== B ==
- Victor Barbeau
- Robertine Barry
- Yves Beauchemin
- Honoré Beaugrand
- Victor-Lévy Beaulieu
- Saul Bellow
- Christophe Bernard
- Jovette Bernier
- Louky Bersianik
- Claudine Bertrand
- Gérard Bessette
- Lise Bissonnette
- Neil Bissoondath
- Marie-Claire Blais
- Maxime Raymond Bock
- France Boisvert
- Louise Bombardier
- Paul-Émile Borduas
- Jacques Brault
- Lysette Brochu
- Nicole Brossard
- Chrystine Brouillet
- Françoise Bujold

== C ==
- Pierre du Calvet
- Lisa Carducci
- Jean-François Caron
- Roch Carrier
- George-Étienne Cartier
- Henri-Raymond Casgrain
- Éric Chacour
- Catherine Chandler
- William Chapman
- Pierre Francois Xavier de Charlevoix
- Pierre-Joseph-Olivier Chauveau
- Évelyne de la Chenelière
- Lesley Chesterman
- Adrienne Choquette
- Leonard Cohen
- Laure Conan
- Arlette Cousture
- Octave Crémazie
- Ross Cuthbert

== D ==
- Jean-Marc Dalpé
- Anne Dandurand
- Diane-Monique Daviau
- Nicholas Dawson
- Claire Dé
- Monique Deland
- Esther Delisle
- Dominique Demers
- Denise Desautels
- Jean-Paul Desbiens
- Louis-Antoine Dessaulles
- Aurore Dessureault-Descôteaux
- Ann Diamond
- Nicolas Dickner
- Hélène Dorion
- Réjean Ducharme
- Fernand Dumont
- Louise Dupré

== E ==
- Bernard Émond
- Louis Émond

== F ==
- Alain Farah
- Trevor Ferguson
- Jacques Ferron
- Naomi Fontaine
- Arlette Fortin
- Louis-Honoré Fréchette
- Christiane Frenette

== G ==
- Madeleine Gagnon
- Mavis Gallant
- François-Xavier Garneau
- Hector de Saint-Denys Garneau
- Phillipe-Ignace François Aubert du Gaspé
- Philippe-Joseph Aubert de Gaspé
- Claude Gauvreau
- Gratien Gélinas
- Karoline Georges
- Antoine Gérin-Lajoie
- Jean-Claude Germain
- Jacques Godbout
- David Gow
- Alain Grandbois
- Taras Grescoe
- Lionel Groulx

== H ==
- Pauline Harvey
- Valérie Harvey
- Anne Hébert
- Louis Hémon
- Claire Holden Rothman
- Nicole Houde

== J ==
- Suzanne Jacob
- Roland-Benoît Jomphe
- Gilles Jobidon

== K ==
- Naïm Kattan

== L ==
- Dany Laferrière
- Michèle Lalonde
- Kev Lambert
- Claire de Lamirande
- Serge Lamothe
- Suzanne Lamy
- Monique LaRue
- Pierre de Sales Laterrière
- Mona Latif-Ghattas
- Félix Leclerc
- Elizabeth Lemay
- Roger Lemelin
- Robert Lepage
- Rosanna Eleanor Leprohon
- Samantha Leriche-Gionet
- Pierre Leroux

== M ==
- Blanche Lucile Macdonnell
- Michèle Mailhot
- Andrée Maillet
- Antonine Maillet
- Jovette Marchessault
- Gabriel Marcoux-Chabot
- Sarah McNeil
- Fleury Mesplet
- Stéfani Meunier
- Gaston Miron
- Jeffrey Moore
- Wajdi Mouawad

== N ==
- Émile Nelligan
- Pierre Nepveu

== O ==
- Francine Ouellette
- Madeleine Ouellette-Michalska
- Hélène Ouvrard

== P ==
- Philippe Panneton
- Alice Parizeau
- Louise Penny
- Bryan Perro
- Joseph-Octave Plessis
- Anique Poitras
- Aline Poulin
- Jacques Poulin
- Yves Préfontaine
- Monique Proulx

== Q ==
- Joseph Quesnel
- Pascale Quiviger

== R ==
- Mordecai Richler
- Louis Riel
- Dominique Robert
- Suzanne Robert
- Esther Rochon
- Adolphe-Basile Routhier
- Maryse Rouy
- André Roy
- Gabrielle Roy

== S ==
- Félix-Antoine Savard
- Marie Savard
- Jocelyne Saucier
- Aki Shimazaki
- Jaspreet Singh
- Sonja Skarstedt
- Gaétan Soucy
- Olivier Sylvestre

== T ==
- Jules-Paul Tardivel
- Ruth Taylor
- France Théoret
- Yves Thériault
- Alex Thibodeau
- Michaël Trahan
- Clarisse Tremblay
- Larry Tremblay
- Lise Tremblay
- Michel Tremblay
- Roland Michel Tremblay
- Marie-Rose Turcot
- Élise Turcotte

== U ==
- Marie Uguay

== V ==
- Lise Vaillancourt
- Pierre Vallières
- Élisabeth Vonarburg

== Y ==
- Ying Chen

== See also ==
- List of Quebecers
- Lists of Canadian writers
- List of Canadian women writers in French
- List of French Canadian writers from outside Quebec
- Francophone literature

== Sources ==
- (in French) L'ÎLE, le Centre de documentation virtuel sur la littérature québécoise – biographies and bibliographies of over 1000 Quebec authors
