= Yolande Villemaire =

Canadian novelist, short story writer and poet

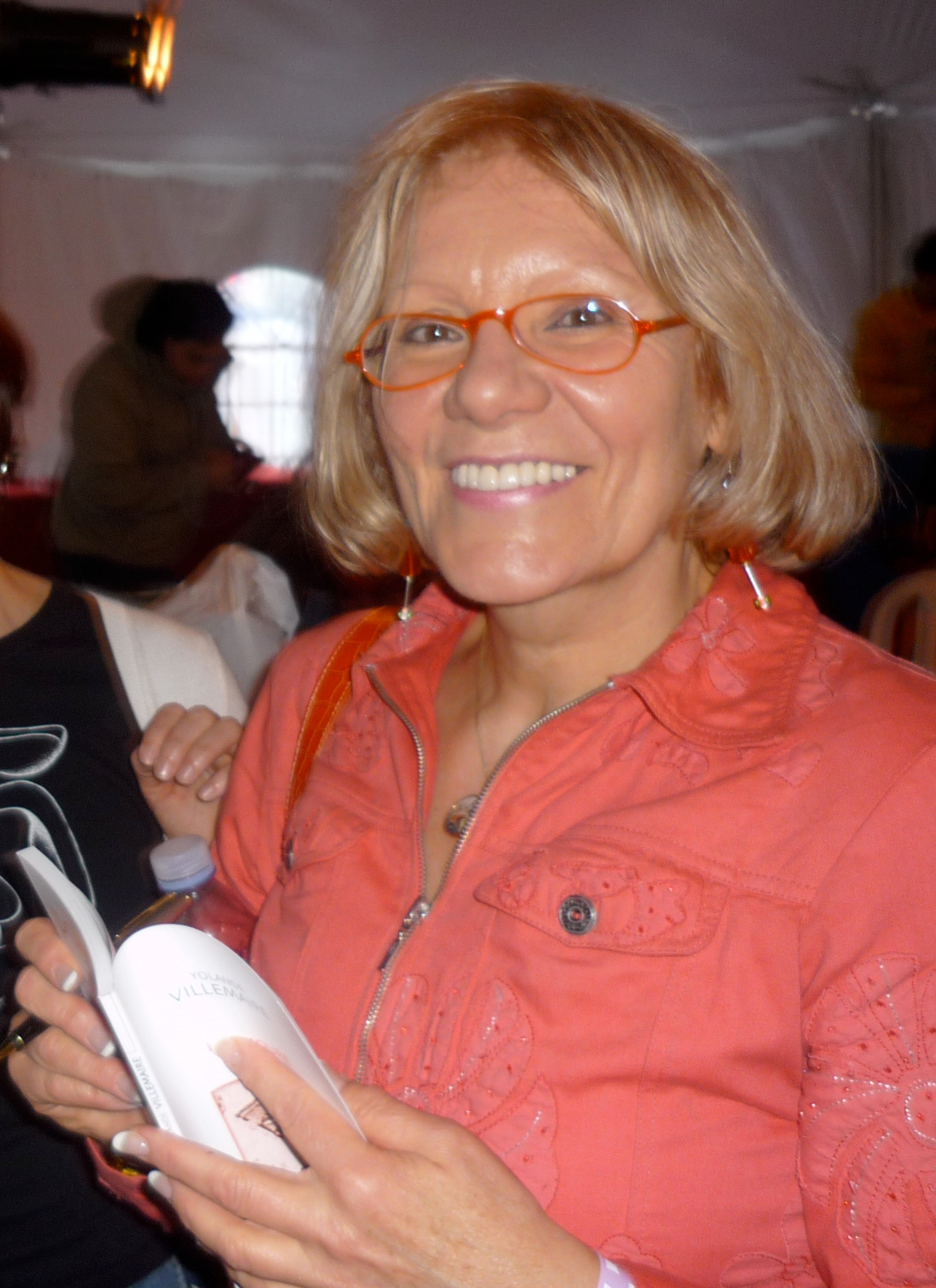
Yolande Villemaire

Yolande Villemaire (born 28 August 1949 in Mirabel, Quebec) is a Canadian novelist, short story writer and poet.

She obtained a Bachelor in theater (1970) and a master's degree in letters (1974) from the University of Quebec at Montreal. She worked as an actor, and later became a professor of theatre. She has published books of poetry and novels since 1974. She won awards for "La vie en prose" (1980) and "La constellation des cygnes" (1985).

She has directed the collection "hieroglyph" in XYZ editor since 1999.

== Bibliography ==
=== Poetry ===
- Machine Does Les Herbes rouges, Montreal, 1974
- Whether the blood stage, Cul-Q Publishing, Montreal, 1977
- Terre de mue, Éditions Cul-Q, Montréal, 1978 Earth moved, Cul-Q Publishing, Montreal, 1978
- Hieroglyph side of what is called reality, Les Herbes rouges, Montreal, 1982
- Adrenaline, Chillwind, Montreal, 1982
- The land Coincidences, The Full Moon Hotel, 1983
- Young women always the most beautiful red, urban Lips 8, Montreal, 1984
- Quartz and mica, Les Ecrits des Forges (Quebec) and Castor Astral (France), 1985
- The Indian moon, Les Ecrits des Forges, Trois-Rivieres, 1994
- The walls of fog, The Writings of Forges, Trois-Rivieres, 1997
- Amber and shade, Ecrits des Forges, Trois-Rivieres in 2000 and 2003 (paperback)
- Celeste sadness, Hexagon 1997, The Writings of Forges / Le Temps des Cerises, Trois-Rivières/Pantin, 2006
- The armor, Ecrits des Forges (Quebec) and Phi (Luxembourg), 2009

=== Novels ===
- Lynley White, Guerin, 1974, Typo, Montreal 1985
- La Vie en prose, Les Herbes rouges, 1980 Typo Montreal, 1986
- Amazon Angel, Red Grass, Montreal, 1982
- Constellation The Swan, The Full Moon, 1985, Typo, Montreal, 1996
- Vava, The Hexagon, Montreal, 1989
- The God in the Hexagon, Montreal, 1995
- Small red fruits, al. "Hieroglyph" XYZ éditeur, Montreal, 2001
- The wave of Amsterdam, XYZ (Qc) and Le Castor Astral (France), 2003
- Poets and centaurs, XYZ éditeur, Montreal 2005
- India, India, XYZ éditeur, Montreal 2007

=== In translation ===
- Quartz & Mica. Trad. Judith Cowen. Guernica, Montreal, 1987
- Amazon Angel. Trad. by Gérald Leblanc, Guernica, Toronto, Canada 1993
- Muros de niebla. Trad. by Silvia Pratt, Mantis Editores, Guadalajara, Mexico, 2003
- Midnight Tides of Amsterdam Trad. by Leonard Sugden, Ekstasis Publishing, Victoria, BC, Canada, 2004
- The Costellazioni del Cigno. Trad. by Osvaldo Lanzolla. WIP Edizioni, Bari, Italy, 2005
- Poets & Centaurs. Trad. by Leonard Sugden. Ekstasis Publishing, Victoria, BC Canada 2006
- Celeste tristeza. Trad. by Gabriel Martin, Literalia Editores, Guadalajara Mexico 2006
- The divinity danzante Trad. by Osvaldo Lanzolla. WIP Edizioni, Bari, Italy 2007
- Little Red Berries. Trad. Leonard Sugden, Ekstasis Publishing, Victoria, BC 2008
- L'onda di Amsterdam.Trad. Lorella Martinelli, Edizioni Scientifiche Italiane, Naples 2009
- India, India. Trad. Leonard Sugden, Ekstasis Publishing, Victoria, BC, 2009
- Quebec 2008, Co-edition Writings Forges (Quebec) and Bag Tags (France), 216 p. (ISBN 978-2-89645-062-6 and ISBN 978-2-915299-26-7).

Joint collection of poetry in French with 20 authors whose Mongeau France, Yolande Villemaire, Claude Beausoleil, Denise Boucher, Stéphane Despatie, Claudine Bertrand for Quebec and Georges Bonnet, Odile Caradec, Bozi Raymond, Jean-Claude Martin, James Sacré, Josyane Bergey of Jesus for France.

== Honors ==
- 1980 - Young Writers Award from the Journal de Montreal, La Vie en prose
- 1979 - Award Competition works radio Radio-Canada, Beautiful Night
- 1985 - Roman Price, Journal de Montréal, the Cygnus
- 1995 - Edgar Award-Lespérance
- 1997 - Guest of Honor at the Salon du Livre de Montreal
- 1998 - Award-Yves Theriault Radio-Canada, Women of salt
- 1998 - Competition News Radio-Canada
- 2001 - Prix littéraires Radio-Canada poetry for The armor
- 2008 - International Poetry Prize Gatien Lapointe-Jaime Sabines
- 2009 - Career Awards Council of Arts and Letters from Quebec
