= Marie-Sœurette Mathieu =

Haitian sociologist, teacher and writer (born 1949)

Marie-Soeurette
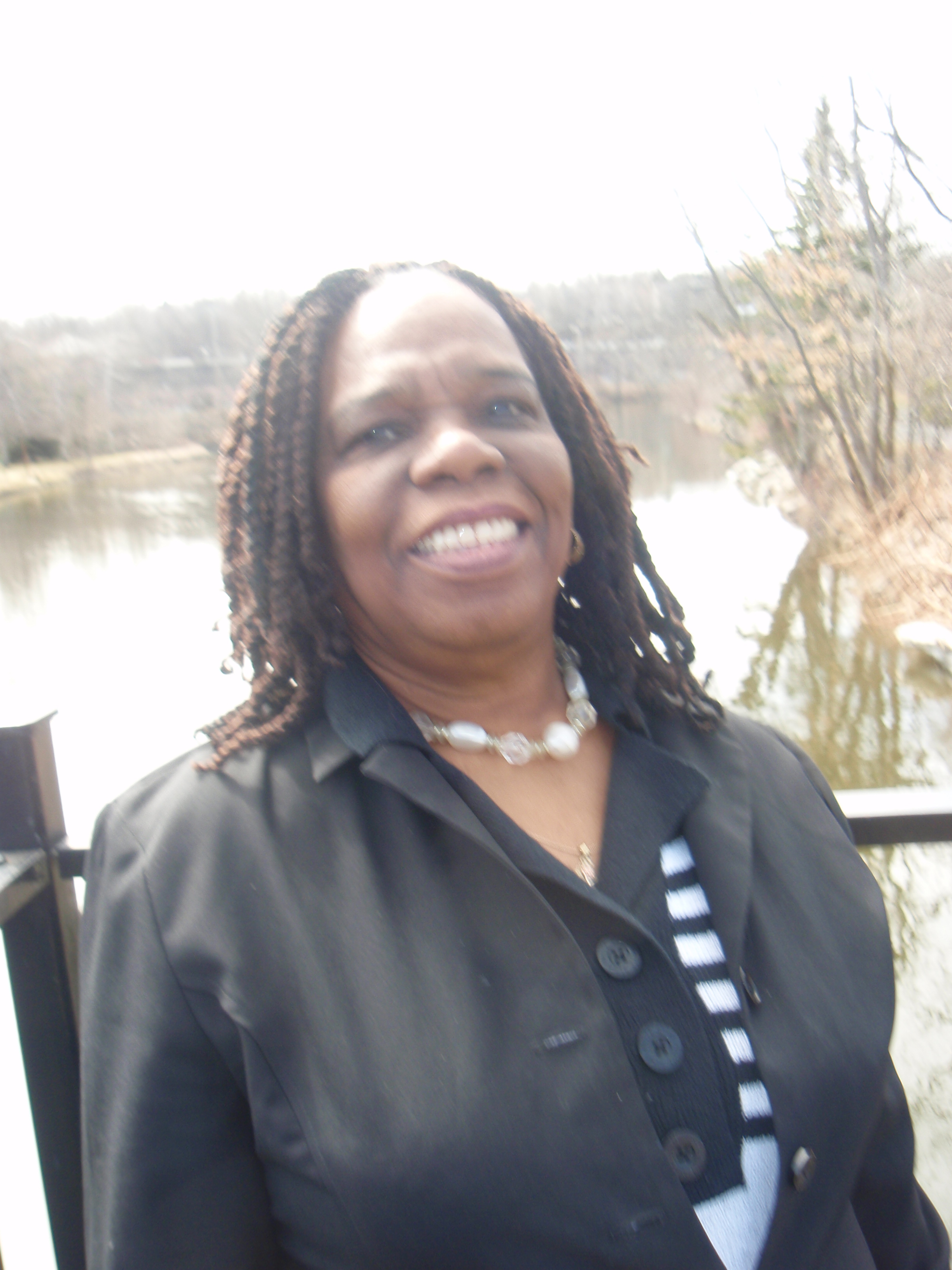
- Marie-Soeurette in 2014
- Born: Marie-Sœurette Mathieu; August 10, 1949; Port-au-Prince, Haiti
- Died: July 20, 2023; Laval, Québec, Canada
- Education: UQAM
- Occupations: sociologist, teacher and writer, painter
- Employer(s): UNEQ and Société littéraire de Laval

Marie-Sœurette Mathieu (August 10, 1949 – July 20, 2023) was a Haitian sociologist, teacher and writer who lived in Quebec until the end of her life. She was also a painter.

She left her native land in 1970 and went first to the United States and later to Quebec. She studied sociology and education at the UQAM, and she is a member of UNEQ and the Société littéraire de Laval, French organisation in Laval, Québec.

== Bibliography ==
- Lueurs poems Port-au-prince 1971
- Poèmes d'autrefois et Fêlures Montréal : Schindler Press 1976
- Lueurs; et, Quinze poèmes d'éveil, Montréal : Édition Lagomatik 1991
- Pagaille dans la ville, Montréal : Humanitas 1995
- Ardémée poèmes Montréal : Humanitas 1997
- L'amour en exil, Montréal : Éditions du CIDIHCA 2000
- Double choc pour Mélanie Montréal : Éditions du CIDIHCA 2002
- Retrouvailles Laval : Éditions Teichtner 2004
- Un pas vers la Matrice, Montreal: Éditions Grenier 2009
- L'autre face des Étoiles, Poèmes et Haïkus, Lorraine: Éditions Le grand fleuve 2012 ISBN 978-2-922673-21-0
- Châteaux de sucre, roman, Lorraine: Éditions Le grand fleuve 2015 (ISBN 978-2-922673-26-5) Version numérique (ISBN 978-2-922673-28-9)
- La force des lettres, autobiographie, Montréal Édition du CIDIHCA 2018, (ISBN 978-2-89454-510-2) –
- L'Envol, anthologie, Montreal Édition du CIDIHCA 2020, (ISBN 9782894 544273)
