= Denise Boucher =

Canadian writer (1935–2025)

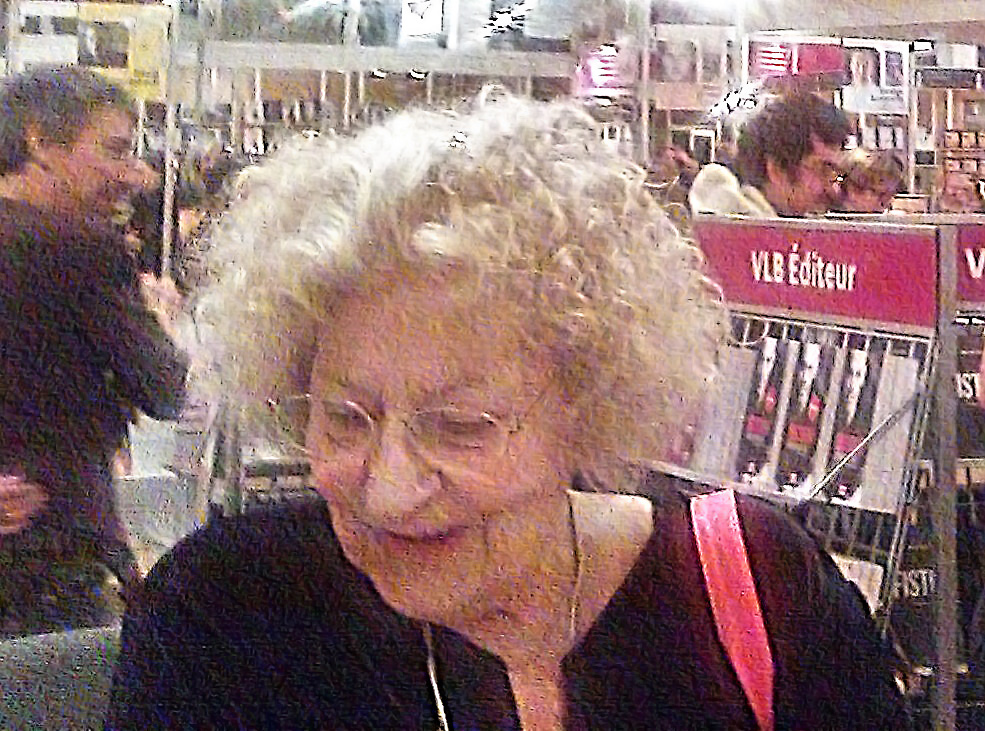
- Born: December 12, 1935; Victoriaville, Quebec, Canada
- Died: March 18, 2025 (aged 89); Montreal, Quebec, Canada
- Occupations: Teacher, journalist, playwright, poet, lyricist
- Writing career
- Language: Canadian French
- Notable awards: Prix des lecteurs du Marché de la poésie de Montréal (2002), Prix Adagio (2015)

Denise Boucher (December 12, 1935 – March 18, 2025) was a Canadian writer from Quebec.

== Life and career ==
The daughter of Alexandre Boucher, police chief, and Justine Bélair, she was born in Victoriaville, Quebec. She received a teaching certificate from the École normale Marguerite-Bourgeoys in Sherbrooke in 1953. She taught school in Victoriaville until 1961 when she began a career in journalism and broadcasting, moving to Montreal. She contributed to various newspapers and was a freelance journalist for Radio Canada. In 1978, she published the feminist work Cyprine: essai collage pour être une femme, which incorporates prose, poetry and quotations.

In 1978, her noted feminist play Les fées ont soif was presented at the Théâtre du Nouveau Monde in Montreal. The play was met with strong opposition from the Catholic Church for its portrayal of the Virgin Mary. An English translation The Fairies are Thirsty was prepared by Alan Brown. Her play Les Divines was presented at the Théâtre d'Aujourd'hui in 1996.

Her musical review Gémeaux croisées toured Quebec and France to sold-out audiences, featuring performances by Pauline Julien and Anne Sylvestre respectively and directed by Viviane Théophilidès.

Her collections of poetry include Paris Polaroïd (1990) and Grandeur nature (1993). She participated in numerous poetry festivals around the globe.

Boucher also wrote a rock opera Rose Ross (1983) and scripts for television and radio, as well as lyrics for popular songs for singers including Dan Bigras, Pauline Julien, Gerry Boulet, Chloé Sainte-Marie and Louise Forestier.

From 1998 to 2000, she was president of the Union des écrivaines et des écrivains québécois.

Boucher died on March 18, 2025, at the age of 89. A few weeks prior, she was admitted to the Centre hospitalier de l'Université de Montréal for respiratory problems. She had medical assistance in dying.

== Awards and honours ==
In 2002, she received the Prix des lecteurs du Marché de la poésie de Montréal. In 2015, she was awarded the Prix Adagio.
