= Donald Alarie =

Quebec writer

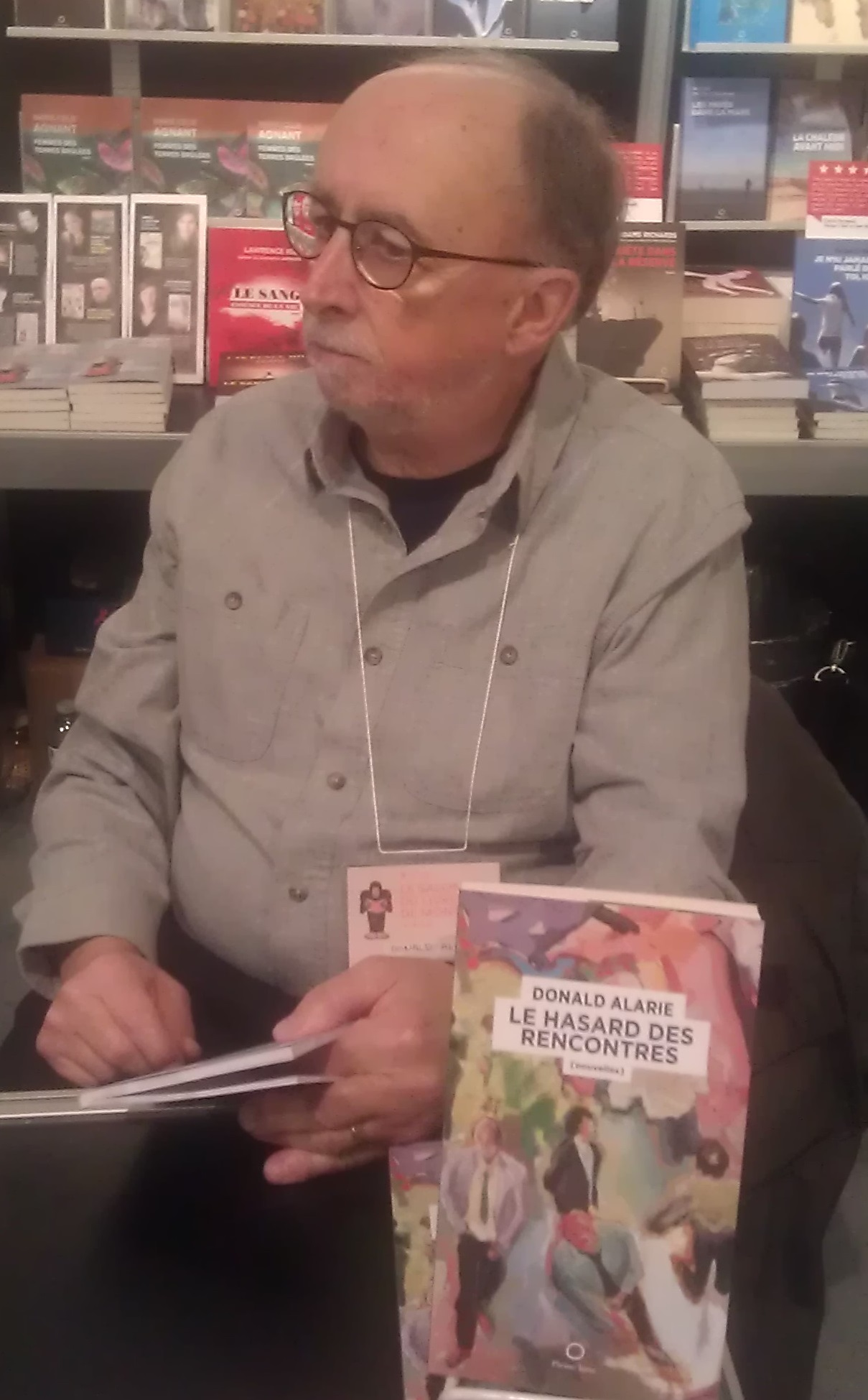

Donald Alarie (born 4 July 1945) is a writer from Quebec.

Alarie was born in Montreal to Jean-Paul Alarie and his wife Thérèse (née Raymond). He graduated from University of Montreal in 1971, and worked as a teacher at the Cégep de Joliette from 1971 to 1997. He has written for several publications: Moebius, Liberté, Le Sabord, Combats, Estuaire, Brèves littéraires, XYZ (revue), La poésie au Québec.

== Prizes ==
- 1978: Prix Gibson
- 1980: Prix Jean-Béraud-Molson for Jérôme et les mots
- 1987: Prix littéraire Marcel-Panneton
- 2006: Prix à la création artistique du Conseil des arts et des lettres du Québec pour la région de Lanaudière

== Works ==
- 1971: Animages animots : spicilège de l'animateur
- 1977: La rétrospection, ou, Vingt-quatre heures dans la vie d'un passant P. Tisseyre,
- 1979: Du silence
- 1979: La visiteuse
- 1980: Jérôme et les mots P. Tisseyre, ISBN 978-2-89051-041-8
- 1980: Graphignes
- 1983: La Vie d'hôtel en automne Cercle Du Livre De France, ISBN 978-2-89051-080-7
- 1986: Un Homme paisible P. Tisseyre, ISBN 978-2-89051-317-4
- 1987: Petits formats Ecrits des Forges, ISBN 978-2-89046-123-9
- 1990: La Terre comme un dessin inachevé (Poems) Écrits des Forges, ISBN 978-2-89046-181-9
- 1990: Au cru du vent Ecrits des forges, ISBN 978-2-89046-198-7
- 1992: Comme un lièvre pris au piège
- 1993: Parfois même la beauté (Poems) Écrits des Forges, ISBN 978-2-89046-304-2
- 1995: Les figurants Tisseyre, ISBN 978-2-89051-575-8
- 1997: Ainsi nous allons (Poetry) Écrits des Forges, ISBN 978-2-89046-443-8
- 1999: Avec notre fragilité ordinaire (Poetry) Écrits des Forges, ISBN 978-2-89046-531-2
- 1999: Tu crois que ça va durer?: roman, XYZ, ISBN 978-2-89261-254-7
- 2002: Cinéma urbain (Poetry) Écrits des Forges, ISBN 978-2-89046-721-7
- 2004: Au café ou ailleurs XYZ éditeur, ISBN 978-2-89261-410-7
- 2006: Au jour le jour XYZ, ISBN 978-2-89261-468-8
- 2006: Todo está perdido, todo se vuelve a encontrar/ Tout est perdu, tout est retrouvé
- 2008: David et les autres, novel, XYZ, ISBN 978-2-89261-530-2
- 2010: Thomas est de retour, novel, XYZ, ISBN 978-2-89261-577-7
- 2010: Comme on joue du piano, Éditions Trois-Pistoles, ISBN 978-2-89583-220-1
- 2010: J'admets que cela est éphémère, poetry, Écrits des Forges
- 2011: attends ton appel, XYZ éditeur, ISBN 978-2-89261-645-3
- 2012: En souvenir d'eux, poetry, Éditions Le Murmure, ISBN 978-2-9807563-6-8
- 2014: À domicile, poetry, Écrits des Forges, ISBN 978-2-89645-276-7
- 2016 Le hasard des rencontres La Pleine Lune,ISBN 978-2-89024-459-7
- 2017 Puis nous nous sommes perdus de vue, La Pleine Lune
- 2018 Arpenteur du quotidien, poetry, Écrits des Forges
- 2021 Sa valise ne contient qu'un seul souvenir, novella, La Pleine Lune
- 2023 Paysages intérieurs (with François Lauzier), Bell'Arte.
- 2024. Tous ces gens que l'on croise, Ed La Pleine Lune.
- 2024 Nuances de la saison, poetry, Écrits des Forges.
- 2026 Vivre dans un arbre. De petites proses, Ed La Pleine Lune.

== See also ==
- Canadian literature
- Canadian poetry
- List of Canadian poets
- List of Canadian writers
- List of Quebec writers
