= Suzanne Aubry =

Canadian novelist, scriptwriter and playwright (born 1956)

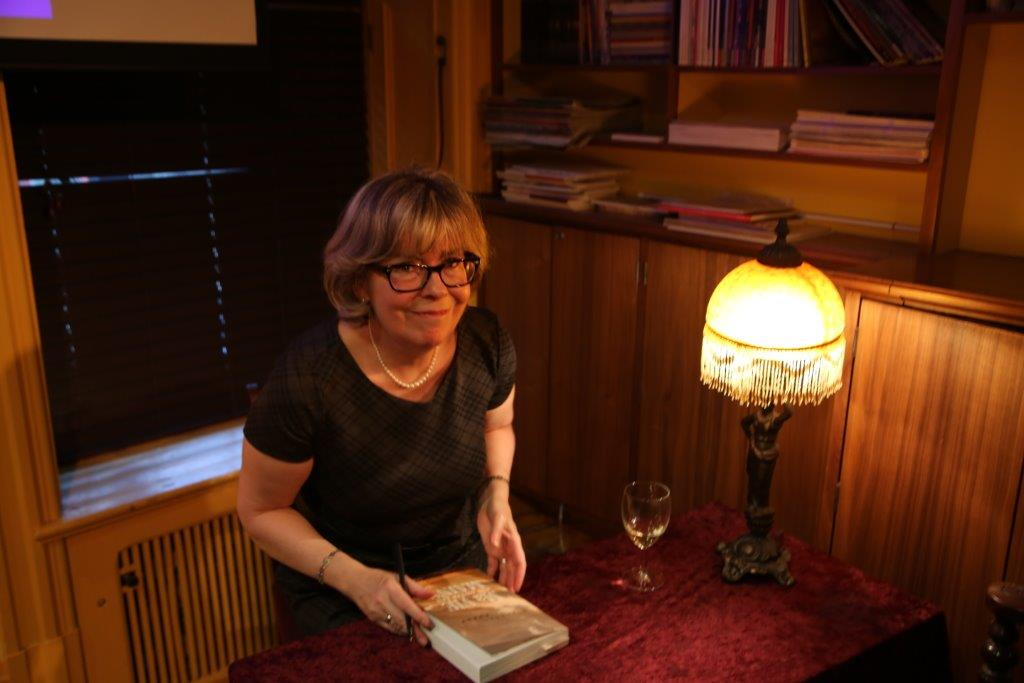

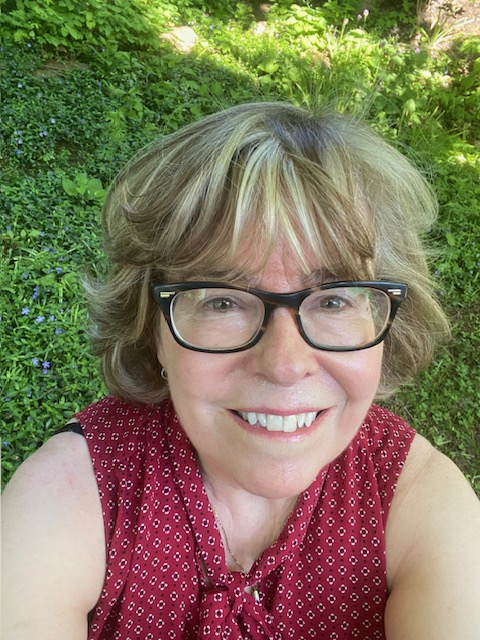
L'écrivaine Suzanne Aubry dans son jardin

Suzanne Aubry CM (born 1956) is a Canadian novelist, screenwriter and playwright from Montreal.

Suzanne Aubry was born in Ottawa to Claude Aubry and Paule Saint-Onge, who were novelists. She graduated in playwriting from the National Theatre School of Canada and, in 1987, her play La nuit des p'tits couteaux was nominated for a Governor General's Award.

Suzanne Aubry wrote the screenplay for the 1994 feature film Meurtre en musique, directed by Gabriel Pelletier. With Louise Pelletier, she wrote the screenplays for three prime time television series: Sauve qui peut! ( TVA), À nous deux! and Mon meilleur ennemi (Radio-Canada). Prior to this, she contributed episodes of Manon which was aired on Radio-Canada, and La Maison Deschênes, the first fiction series aired on Télévision Quatre Saisons (TQS). She was the President of the Société des auteurs en radio, télévision et cinéma (SARTEC) from 1996 to 2000.

As a critic and columnist, Suzanne Aubry has contributed to Le Devoir and the Cahiers de théâtre Jeu. She has taught playwriting at the Institut national de l'image et du son (INIS), the Université du Québec à Montréal and the National Theatre School of Canada.

In 2006, Suzanne Aubry published her first novel, Le fort intérieur, which was nominated for the Grand prix de la relève littéraire Archambault. She then wrote an historical series, Fanette, revolving around an Irish orphan exiled to 19th century Quebec. The series in 7 volumes has sold more than 100,000 copies and the first two volumes of Fanette are available in English in digital format.

The author's ninth novel, Ma vie est entre tes mains, was published in 2015 by Libre Expression. The French publisher Robert Laffont purchased the rights to the book, which was published in France under the title Ma vie entre tes mains in 2016. It was then nominated for the Prix des cinq continents de la francophonie 2016, presided over by the writer J. M. G. Le Clézio. Ma vie entre tes mains was also published by Pocket in a paperback format in 2018. Suzanne Aubry has written several other novels, including Je est une autre and La Cueva (Éditions Libre Expression), both well received by the readers and the media.

Following in her father's footsteps, Suzanne Aubry adapted his book Le Violon magique et autres légendes du Canada français (originally published in 1968 by les Éditions Des deux Rives). This new edition is entitled Le Violon magique - Contes et légendes du Québec and was published by Les Éditions Québec Amérique in 2019. It features illustrations by the artist Saul Field, which were a part of the 1968 edition.

Suzanne Aubry has completed a play for the theatre, Recyclage, which has been refined in a workshop organized by the Centre des auteurs dramatiques (CEAD) with the collaboration of the director Marie Charlebois, and the actress Évelyne Rompré. The author has also written her first children's novel, Le Septième étage et demi, about Camille, a 13 year old teenager who loses her mother to leukemia, and tries to cope with her loss. The book, illustrated by Delphie Côté-Lacroix, was published by les Éditions Québec Amérique in 2022. It was nominated for the Tamarac/Tree of books Award, organized by the Association des bibliothèques de l'Ontario (ABO).

In 2021, Suzanne Aubry revisited her popular historical series Fanette. The first book, Fanette - La suite - Amitiés particulières, was published by Les Éditions Libre Expression in 2021. The second and third books, Fanette - La suite - Aveux and Fanette - La suite - Un monde nouveau- were also published by Libre Expression in 2022. All three volumes are available in audio format (Vues et Voies). Her novel, Le Portrait, a psychological thriller, was published in August 2023 and selected by the magazine L’Actualité as one of the best novels of 2023. Her dystopian novel "Tout ce qui reste", inspired by an unfinished story by her twin sister, Danielle Aubry, was published by Stanké in 2025. With a new novel published in 2026, "Que le brouillard se lève" (Libre Expression), Suzanne Aubry immerses us in a bustling Montreal between the two world wars.

Suzanne Aubry was a member of the board of directors of the Union des Écrivaines et des Écrivains québécois (UNEQ) beginning in 2011 and the Chair of UNEQ from May 2017 to May 2023. In 2022, she received the Order of Canada for her contribution to Quebec literature, and her engagement in defending the rights of authors.

== Selected works ==
=== Plays ===
- Une goutte d'eau sur la glace (1979)
- J'te l'parle mieux quand j'te l'écris (1981)
- Mon homme (1982)
- La Nuit des p'tits couteaux (Éditions Leméac, 1985)

=== Novels ===
- Le fort intérieur, Éditions Libre Expression (2006)
- Fanette : À la conquête de la haute ville (2009), La vengeance du Lumber Lord (2009), Le secret d'Amanda (2010), L'encre et le sang (2011), Les ombres du passé (2012), Du côté des dames (2013), Honneur et disgrâce (2014), Éditions Libre Expression.
- Ma vie est entre tes mains, Éditions Libre Expression (2015)
- Ma vie entre tes mains, Éditions Robert Laffont (2016)
- Ma vie entre tes mains, Éditions Pocket (2018)
- Je est une autre, Éditions Libre Expression (2017)
- La Cueva, Éditions Libre Expression (2019)
- Le Violon magique - Contes et légendes du Québec, Éditions Québec Amérique (2019).
- Fanette - La suite, Amitiés particulières, Éditions Libre Expression (1921)
- Fanette - La suite, Aveux, Éditions Libre Expression (1922)
- Fanette - La suite, Un Monde nouveau, Éditions Libre Expression (1922)
- Le Septième étage et demi, Éditions Québec Amérique (1922)
