= Roxane Turcotte =

Canadian author (born 1952)

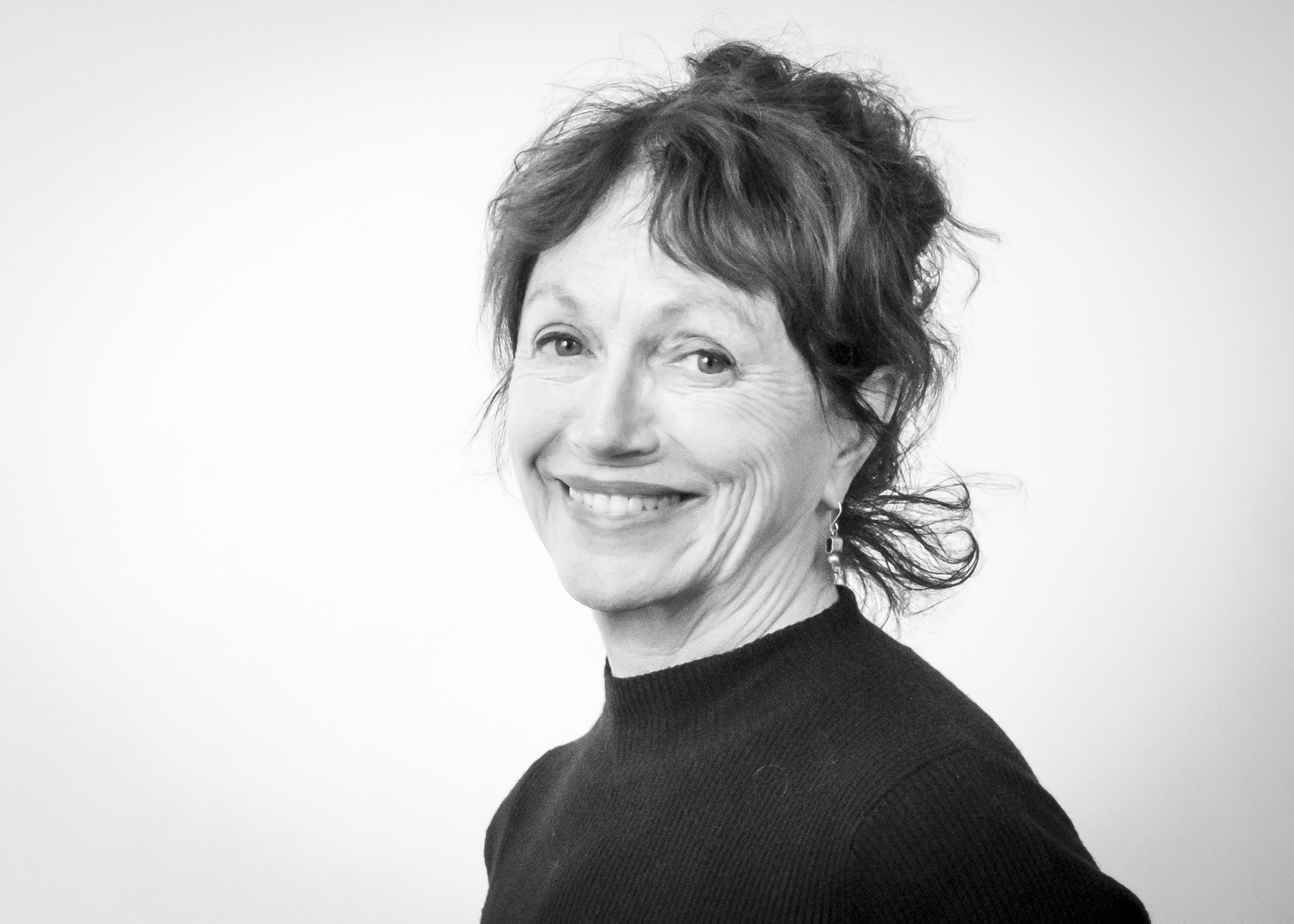
- (2022)
- Born: 1952 (age 73–74); Montreal, Quebec, Canada
- Education: Université de Montréal
- Occupation: Author
- Writing career
- Language: French
- Genres: Children's and youth literature

Roxane Turcotte (born 1952) is a Canadian author of children's and youth literature. Born in Montreal, she lives in the Laurentians. Turcotte has written about forty books within the milieu of Quebec literature. She is the recipient of the 2017 Gaston Miron Excellence in French Award.

== Biography ==
Roxane Turcotte is a graduate of the Université de Montréal in art history and education sciences. She is a French teacher and pedagogical advisor at the Commission scolaire de Montréal. Turcotte was nominated in 2006 for the Bravo award, for having included youth literature when teaching adult literacy learners and non-native-French-speakers, as well as for having participated in the first pajama story-telling sessions for infants in Montreal schools.

She creates and sporadically leads interactive literary workshops as part of the Quebec and Canada book fairs, Partir en livre of the Centre national du livre de France and the Écrivains à l'école program of the Ministry of Culture and Communications of Quebec. She participates in the national tours of Lire à tout vent, Lis avec moi, and Semaine du livre TD.

In 2006, she published her first youth novel, Le vol de la corneille, with Loup de Gouttière editions. She has subsequently published more than thirty children's books.

== Awards and honours ==
- Prix Tamarac 2018 and Peuplier 2020 from the Forêt de la lecture in Toronto for her, Éloi et le cheval de joie and Bilou et la libraire du tonnerre.
- Francophonie selection of the 2019 Saint-Exupéry Prize for Bilou et la libraire du tonnerre
- 2017 Gaston Miron Excellence in French Award

== Selected works ==
- Emma et le tableau volé, 2021
- Énigme au Jardin botanique, 2021
- Mystères au château Frontenac, 2020
- Le manoir aux secrets, 2020
- Des voix d’épouvante, 2020
- Sol ! Sol ! Sol !, 2020
- Adam, les fleurs et le voleur, 2019
- Bilou et la libraire du tonnerre, 2019
- Emma et la fête masquée, 2019
- Le secret de Ratapatapan !, 2018
- Le lapin au grand cœur et Lulu Lustucru, 2018
- Plic, ploc !, 2018
- Raoul de Poupoupidou, 2018
- Saperlifourchette !, 2017
- Éloi et, le cheval de joie, 2017
- L’arc-en-ciel de la rivière, 2017
- Antoine Labelle, curé et Roi du Nord, 2016
- Le piège de l’inconnue, 2016
- Miam, miam !, 2016
- Le lapin au grand cœur, 2016
- Ça suffit, monsieur l’Ogre, 2015
- La perle des neiges, 2014
- La chasse au voleur, 2012
- Zébulon, le zèbre caméléon, 2012
- Marion et la vie qui bat, 2012
- Pic et le grand pin blanc, 2011
- Crac ! Qui va là ?, 2011
- Max, débusqueur de secrets, 2011
- Girafe givrée, 2010
- Chevalier Poids-Plume, 2010
- Zoé et la sorcière, 2009
- Le Vol de la corneille, 2006
