= Blanche Lamontagne-Beauregard =

Canadian poet

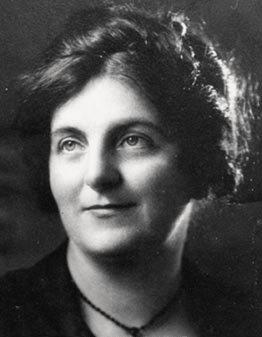
Beauregard Lamontagne

Blanche Lamontagne-Beauregard (January 13, 1889 – May 25, 1958) was a Canadian poet.

She was born in Les Escoumins, Québec, and attended various convent schools before taking classes around 1910 at the École d'enseignement secondaire pour les jeunes filles (which became the Collège Marguerite-Bourgeoys in 1926 and borrowed much of its curriculum from Université Laval). She may have studied literature at the University of Montreal. Her first poetry collection, Visions gaspésiennes (1913), received the Prix de la Société du parler français au Canada. After her marriage to lawyer Hector Beauregard in July 1920, she was able to devote herself to writing. She belongs to Québec's regionalist school of writing and drew largely upon the folklore of the Gaspé Peninsula.

Her work has received some critical reevaluation in the 21st century.

== Bibliography ==
- 1913 - Visions gaspésiennes (French, Gaspesian visions)
- 1917 - Par nos champs et nos rives... (By our fields and shores...)
- 1920 - La Vieille Maison (The old house)
- 1923 - Les Trois Lyres (The three quadrants)
- 1924 - Un Cœur fidèle (A faithful heart)
- 1924 - Récits et Légendes (Accounts and legends)
- 1926 - La Moisson nouvelle (The new harvest)
- 1927 - Légendes gaspésiennes : récits en prose avec illustrations de l'auteur (Gaspesian legends, accounts in prose with illustrations of the author)
- 1928 - Ma Gaspésie (My Gaspesia)
- 1931 - Au Fond des bois (Deep within the woods)
- 1935 - Dans la Brousse : poèmes (In the bush: poems)
- 1943 - Le Rêve d'André (André's dream)

=== Collections published after her death ===
- 1989 - Anthologie de Blanche Lamontagne-Beauregard : première poétesse du Québec (Anthology of Blanche Lamontagne-Beauregard: first female poet of Québec)
- 1991 - Les Quatre Saisons : poèmes choisis (The four seasons: selected poems)
