= Blanche Lucile Macdonnell =

Canadian folklorist (1853–1924)

Blanche Lucile Macdonnell (Note: Occasionally spelled as Macdonell) (1853–1924) was a Canadian author and folklorist, whose writing was described as 'full-blooded and instinct with Canadian life and thought.'

== Life ==
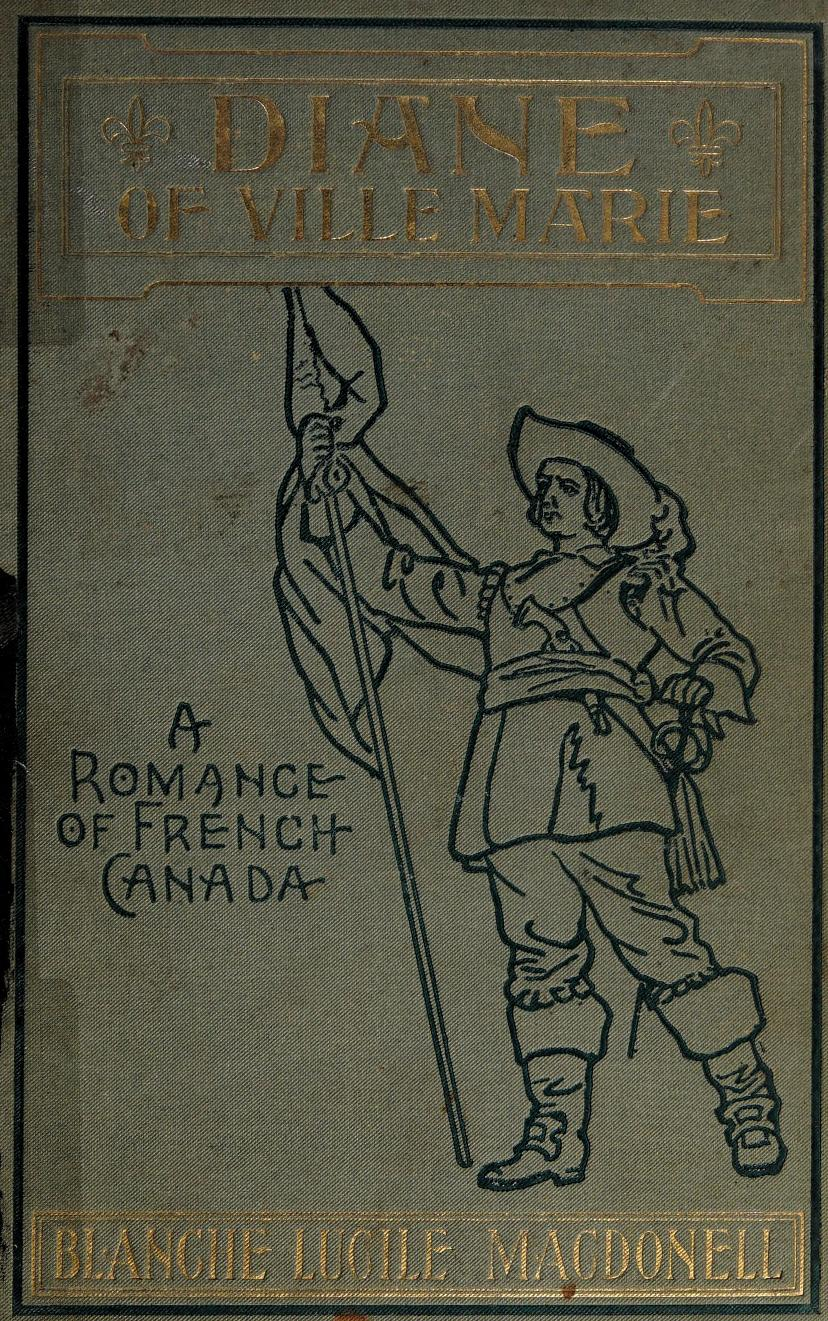
Cover of Diane of Ville Marie by Blanche Lucile Macdonnell, 1898

Macdonnell lived in Montreal, United Province of Canada and much of her writing focused on French Canadian subjects. Her 'first serious attempt in fiction' was Diane of Ville Marie: a romance of French Canada, published in 1898. The book's subject was seventeenth century Montreal, or 'Ville Marie' as it was then called.

In his 1901 work Canadian Essays, critical and historical, Thomas O'Hagan gave a short biography of Macdonnell, writing that:

Margaret Polson Murray, Maud Ogilvy and Blanche Lucile Macdonnell are three Montreal women who have done good work with their pens... Miss Macdonnell is of English and French extraction. On her mother's side she holds kinship with Abbe Ferland, late Professor in Laval University, Quebec, and author of the well-known historical work, "Cours d'Histoire du Canada." Like Miss Ogilvy, Miss Macdonnell has essayed novel writing with success, making the old French regime in Canada the chief field of her exploration and study. Two of her most successful novels are "The World's Great Altar Stairs" and "Diane of Ville Marie." The latter is a very good study of French Canadian life during the close of the seventeenth century. Miss Macdonnell has written for many of the leading American periodicals, and has gained an entrance into several journals in England. Her work is full-blooded and instinct with Canadian life and thought.

Other critics have noted 'a feeling of timelessness and displacement' present in Macdonnell's depictions of Canada. For example, wrote Carole Fainstat Gerson:

Blanche Macdonnell's "The Heroism of La Petite Marie" takes place in Beaulieu: "remote from any large town, Beaulieu might as well have been situated at the North Pole, so far did it seem removed from the busy turmoil of the world."

Macdonnell was also a member of the Ladies' Committee of the American Folklore Society, Montreal Branch, and acted as its Secretary. In 1894, she

contributed an outline of a tale of the soil, comprising a Canadian legend, based on the essential features of the popular life of French Canada, dealing with the vicissitudes and hardships encountered by the voyageurs and hunters in that life of the woods which belonged to pioneers of the old regime.

Macdonnell herself described the folklore and superstitions of a country as 'the people's poetry'. In an 1894 article for Popular Science Monthly she wrote:

Tradition constitutes the archives of a people, the treasures of their faiths and beliefs, the landmarks of their past history. The people's superstitions are, in truth, the people's poetry—crude, grotesque, but surely most pathetic efforts to find shape and substance for images cast by their own innate emotions, fears, and aspirations. These blind searchings after truths that lie beyond the confines of the senses, and outside the domain of logic, possess a deep significance from a human as well as from a literary point of view. These strivings are themselves phenomena to be taken into account before we can solve the problem of life.

Blanche Lucile Macdonnell died in 1924.

== Bibliography ==
- 'The Heroism of La Petite Marie' in The Canadian Monthly and National review (1880)
- 'The literary movement in Canada up to 1841' in Canadiana (1890)
- 'Superstitions of the French Canadians' in Popular Science Monthly (1894)
- 'A Clever Little Builder' in St. Nicholas (1895)
- 'The Ice-Bound St Lawrence' in The Sketch (1896)
- Diane of Ville Marie: a romance of French Canada (1898)
- 'A Queen of Tatters' in The Canadian Magazine (1905)
- 'Brant and the Butlers' in the University Magazine (1908)
