= Francine Allard =

Quebec educator, novelist, poet, and visual artist

- Born: October 16, 1949 (age 76) Verdun, Quebec, Canada
- Occupation: Educator; novelist; poet; visual artist
- Education: Université du Québec à Montréal; Conservatoire de musique et d'art dramatique du Québec

Francine Allard (born October 16, 1949) is a Quebec educator, novelist, poet, and visual artist.

She was born in Verdun, Quebec and was educated at the Université du Québec à Montréal and the Institut Pédagogique Marguerite Bourgeoys in Westmount. She also studied at the Conservatoire de musique et d'art dramatique du Québec.

Allard served as secretary-treasurer of the Union des écrivaines et des écrivains québécois and as president of the Association des écrivains québécois pour la jeunesse. She helped establish the Prix Cécile Gagnon to encourage the development of literature for young people. She has contributed to various literary magazines such as CV2, Moebius, Brèves, Art le Sabord and Nuit Blanche.

== Selected works ==
- Ma Belle Pitoune en or, novel (1993)
- Le Mal mystérieux de la salamandre à quatre orteils, young adult novel (1995)
- Babyboom blues, stories (1997)
- Deux Petits Ours au milieu de la tornade, young adult novel (1999)
- Les Mains si blanches de Pye Chang, novel (2000)
- Le Cri du silence, novel (2002)
- Ambroise, bric-à-brac, young adult novel (2004)
- Au bout du quai, poetry (2008)
- La couturière: Les aiguilles du temps (2008), La vengeance de la veuve noire (2009), La persistance du romarin (2010), trilogy
- L'âme inconsciente du pétoncle, poetry (2012)
