= Dominique Robert =

Canadian writer living in Quebec (born 1957)

Dominique Robert (born 1957) is a Canadian writer living in Quebec.

She was born in Hull, Quebec (now Gatineau, Quebec) and grew up in the Outaouais region. She studied literature in Ottawa and studied the teaching of French at the Université du Québec à Montréal. Robert taught French at the secondary school level in Montreal. More recently, she has been an assistant editor at the publishing house Les Herbes rouges. She is a member of the Union des écrivaines et des écrivains québécois.

== Selected works ==
- Jeux et portraits, poetry (1989)
- Moins malheureux que toi ma mère, stories (1990)
- Jours sans peur, stories (1994)
- Caillou, calcul, poetry (2000), finalist for the Prix de poésie Terrasses Saint-Sulpice awarded by the magazine Estuaire
- Leçons d'extérieur, poetry (2009)
- Chambre d'amis, novel (2010), received the Prix littéraire Jacques-Poirier—Outaouais
- La cérémonie du Maître, prose (2015), received the Grand prix du livre de Montréal
