= France Boisvert =

Canadian educator and writer

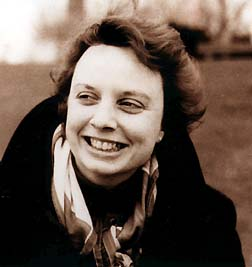
- Born: June 10, 1959 (age 67); Sherbrooke, Quebec

France Boisvert (born June 10, 1959) is a Quebec educator and writer.

== Life ==
She was born in Sherbrooke, Quebec, and received a bachelor's and master's degree in French studies at the Université de Sherbrooke and a PhD from the Université de Montréal. She taught literature at the Collège Lionel-Groulx in Sainte-Thérèse. She was a member of Union des écrivaines et des écrivains québécois (UNEQ) and served on its board of directors.

Boisvert helped launch the literary radio program Au pays des Livres and served as its host. Her poems and essays appeared in various literary journals, such as NBJ, Moebius, Arcade, Liberté, Ruptures - La revue des Trois Amériques, Revue Trois, Littéréalité and La Vie en Rose. From September 2012 to September 2016, she get a radio show named Le Pays des Livres on Radio VM at Montreal.

== Selected works ==
- Les Samourailles, novel (1987)
- Li Tsing-Tao - ou Le grand avoir, short stories (1989)
- Massawippi, poetry (1992)
- Comme un vol de gerfauts, poetry (1993)
- Les vents de l'aube, poetry (1997)
- Le Voyageur aux yeux d'onyx, poetry (2003)
- Un vernis de culture, short stories (2012)
- Vies parallèles, short stories (2014)
- Vers Compostelle, poetry (2014)
- Professeur de paragraphe, novel (2017)
