= Clarisse Tremblay =

Canadian poet and writer

Clarisse Tremblay

Clarisse Tremblay (May 21, 1951 – April 22, 1999) was a poet and writer from the Charlevoix region of Quebec, Canada. Tremblay's main works were in the French language.

== Life ==
Tremplay was born in Les Éboulements and studied music at the École normale de musique of the Collège Marguerite-Bourgeoys and literature at the Université de Montréal. She taught music for two years at a secondary school in the Côte-Nord region. Tremblay then went on to further studies in journalism, music and literature, receiving a PhD in Quebec literature from Laval University in 1983.

During her later studies, she also worked as a freelance researcher and as a host on Radio-Canada radio and television. Tremblay contributed to various journals such as La Revue Desjardins, Ma Caisse, Santé Société, Rencontres québécoises and Estuaire. From 1991 until her death, she taught literature at the Cégep de Sainte-Foy.

Her 1986 poetry collection Jusqu'à la moelle des fièvres was a finalist for the Prix Émile-Nelligan.

She was married to Geoffrey Edwards; the couple had one son.

Tremblay died at the Hôtel-Dieu de Québec in Quebec City at the age of 47.

== Legacy ==
An annual bursary was established in her name at the Cégep de Sainte-Foy.

Alain Leblond used her lyrics for his Pop! : flûte, voix de soprano, cor et contrebasse (2003).

== Selected works ==
- Malgré la vieillesse du soleil, poetry (1995)
- Brisants, poetry (1998)
- Brisants, poetry (2002), published after her death
