= Pauline Harvey =

Pauline Harvey (born November 17, 1950) is a Quebec writer.

The daughter of Laurent-Jules Harvey and Marcelle Gagnon, she was born in Alma, Quebec and was educated at Laval University and the Université de Vincennes. She worked in Ottawa as a reporter for Radio Canada and as a government translator. She performed sound poetry in Montreal and at international conferences.

Harvey published her first novel Le Deuxième monopoly des précieux in 1981, which received the Prix des jeunes écrivains from the Journal de Montréal. Her writing has appeared in the magazines Hobo-Québec, Mainmise, La Barre du jour, Arcade and Lèvres urbaines.

== Selected works ==
- La Ville au gueux, novel (1982)
- Encore une partie pour Berri, novel (1985), received the Prix Molson from the Académie des lettres du Québec
- Un homme est une valse, novel (1992), received the Prix Québec-Paris
