= Aline Poulin =

Canadian poet and writer

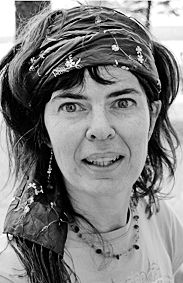
- Born: September 14, 1965 Sherbrooke, Quebec
- Died: August 25, 2011 (aged 45) Granby, Quebec
- Genre: poetry, prose poems

Aline Poulin (September 14, 1965 – August 25, 2011) was a writer in Quebec, Canada.

She was born in Sherbrooke, Quebec, and earned a bachelor's degree in literary and cultural studies and a master's degree and doctorate in French studies. Poulin worked as an archivist at the cultural centre of the University of Sherbrooke, as a researcher and editor at the Carrefour de solidarité internationale and as a literary reporter for radio station CFLX-FM. She also taught literature at the Cégep de Granby Haute-Yamaska.

She received the Prix Alphonse-Piché in 1990 for Tête étreintes, the Prix Gaston-Gouin and the Prix Ronald-Gasparic for the poetry collection La Viole d'Ingres and second prize from the Grand prix littéraire de la ville de Sherbrooke for Dans la glace des autres.

Poulin died in Granby from cancer at the age of 45.
