= Maryse Rouy =

French-born writer living in Quebec (born 1951)

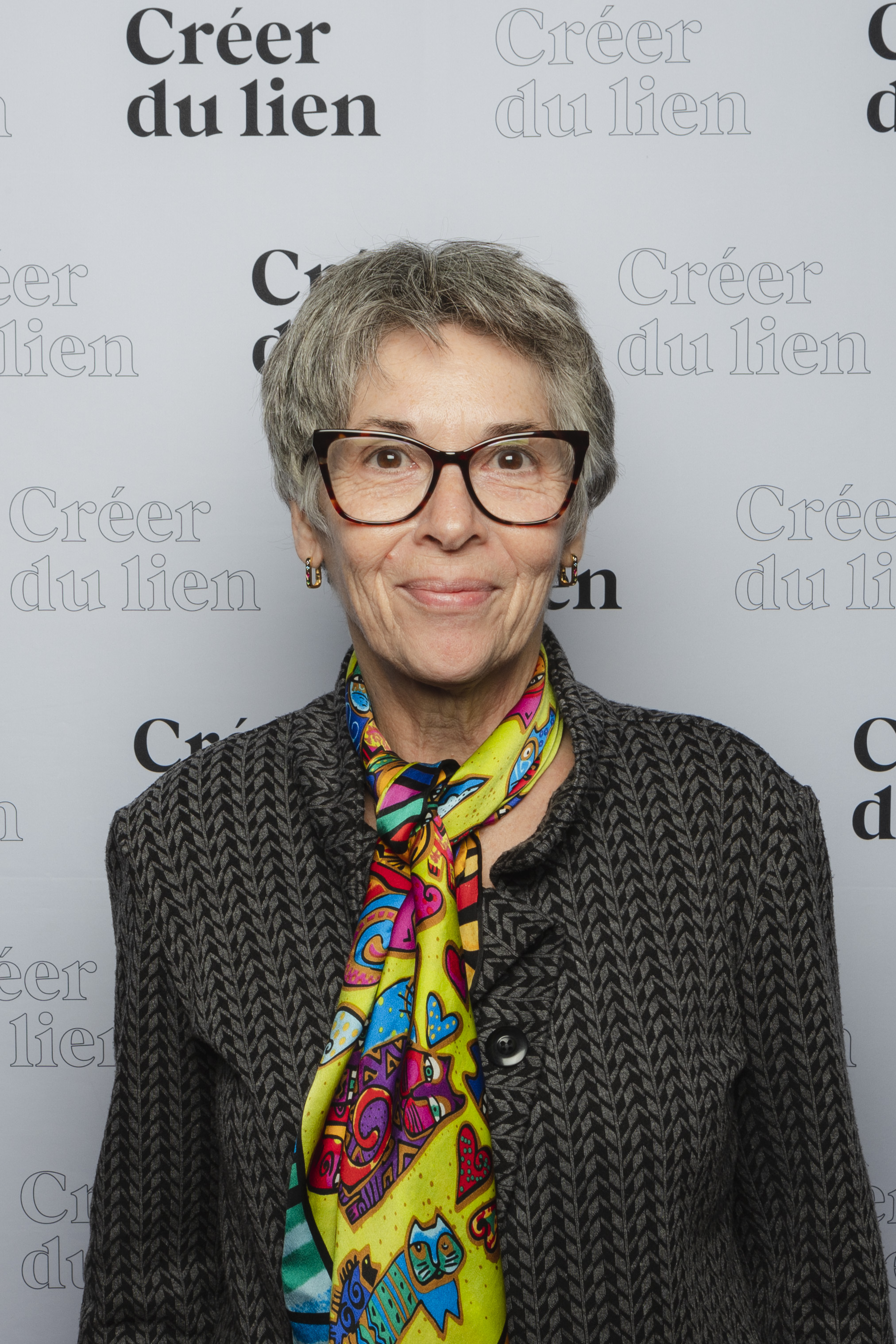
Image of Maryse Rouy

Maryse Rouy (born November 4, 1951) is a French-born writer living in Quebec. She has written novels for both adults and young audiences.

She was born in Saint-Laurent-sur-Save and came to Quebec in 1975. She earned a bachelor's degree in teaching and began teaching in primary school. She went on to study at the Université de Montréal, earning a master's degree on the poetry of troubadours.

== Selected works ==
- Azalaïs - ou, La vie courtoise, novel (1995)
- Jordan et la forteresse assiégée, youth novel (2001)
- Au nom de Compostelle, novel (2003), received the Prix Saint-Pacôme
- Un Avion dans la nuit, youth novel (2010), received the Prix Saint-Exupéry
- Les pavés de Carcassonne, novel (2012)
- Meurtre à l'hôtel Despréaux, novel (2014), finalist for an Arthur Ellis Award
