= Anique Poitras =

Award-winning writer in Quebec, Canada

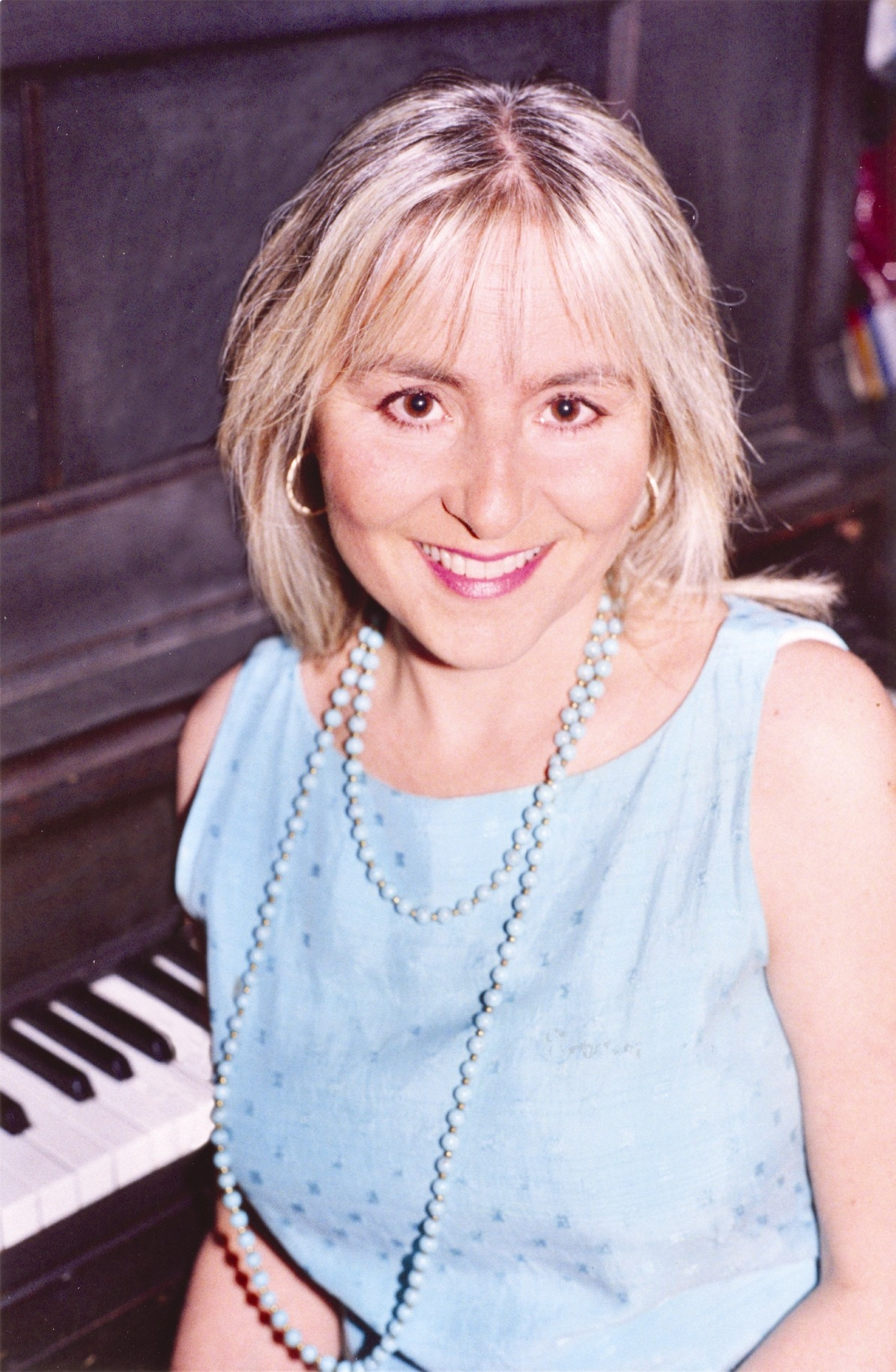
- Born: May 22, 1961 L'Épiphanie, Quebec
- Died: December 19, 2016 (aged 55)
- Genre: poetry, young adult

Anique Poitras (May 22, 1961 – December 19, 2016) was an award-winning writer in Quebec, Canada, whose work was aimed mostly at adolescent readers.

She was born in L'Épiphanie and lived there until the age of 13. Poitras received a bachelor's degree in literary studies from the Université du Québec à Montréal.

Poitras published a number of poems in the literary journal Revue des Écrits des Forges; twice, her poetry received honourable mention for the Prix Alphonse-Piché. Her first novel La Lumière blanche, the first book in her Sara trilogy, was a finalist for the Prix littéraire Desjardins awarded at the Salon international du livre de Québec. The books in the Sara trilogy each received a Prix Livromanie in 1993, 1994 and 1998. The two-volume La Chambre d'Éden, the last book in the trilogy, was a finalist for the Mr. Christie's Book Awards. She participated in many book fairs and public readings and also held writing workshops. She lectured on creative writing at the University of Laval.

Poitras died on December 19, 2016, at the age of 55.

== Selected works ==
- Sara trilogy: La Lumière blanche (1993), La Deuxième Vie (1994), La Chambre d'Éden, two volumes (1998)
- Roman de Sara, novel (2000)
- Isidor Suzor, novel (2002), received the Prix Chronos Vacances
- La Chute du corbeau, novel (2003), received second prize in the Mr. Christie's Book Awards and the Prix international du Salon du livre de Québec
