= Françoise Bujold =

Quebec writer

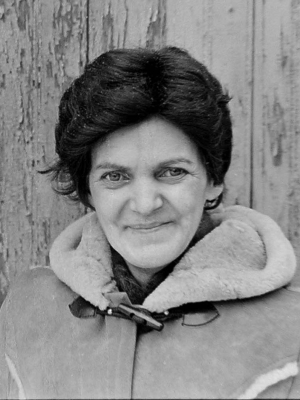
Françoise Bujold

Françoise Bujold (March 6, 1933 – January 18, 1981) was a Quebec writer and artist. She is considered by some to be the first major poet of the Gaspé region.

== Early life and education ==
She was born in Bonaventure and was educated there and in Montreal. Bujold was one of the first female students admitted to the Institut des arts graphiques de Montréal. She studied graphic arts with Albert Dumouchel. In 1959, she began teaching visual arts at the Centre d'art de Percé. She also taught Mi'kmaq children on the Maria reserve. She earned a Bachelor of Education from the École des beaux-arts de Montréal.

== Career ==
Bujold published her first poems at the age of 22. In 1959, she published L'île endormie, a story which included prints produced by her young students. Around 1960, she created her own publishing company, Les Éditions Sentinelle. During the 1960s, she continued to write and exhibited her prints. In 1964, with Jacques Godbout, she directed the short documentary Le monde va nous prendre pour des sauvages for the National Film Board of Canada about young Mi'kmaqs in the Chaleur Bay region.

Between 1959 and 1961, eight radio plays by Bujold were presented on Radio Canada.

In 1961, with her husband, she opened a boite à chansons, which also included an art gallery.

In 1974, the Guilde Graphique published her poem Ah ouiche t'en plain.

== Death and legacy ==
She died of cancer at the age of 47.

The Prix Françoise-Bujold was a literary prize awarded annually in Quebec from 1991 to 2000.

In 2010, David Lonergan published À toi qui n'es pas né au bord de l'eau which included unpublished prints and radio plays by Bujold, as well as a biography.

The public library at Bonaventure was renamed the Bibliothèque Françoise-Bujold in her honour.
