= Adrienne Choquette =

Canadian writer (1915–1973)

Adrienne Choquette (1915 – 1973) was a writer in Quebec, Canada.

== Biography ==
The daughter of Dr. Henri Choquette, She was born in Shawinigan and studied with the Ursulines at Trois-Rivières from 1924 to 1931. Choquette began work with the Quebec public service but soon gravitated towards journalism. She contributed to various newspapers and journals, including Le Bien Public, Le Nouvelliste, Le Samedi, La Revue populaire, Le Jour, Amérique française, Le Devoir and Les Cahiers de l'Académie canadienne-française. From 1937 to 1948, she worked at radio station CHLN in Trois-Rivières, serving as host and director for the station. From 1948 to 1970, she was co-editor and then editor for the Quebec Ministry of Agriculture publication Terre et Foyer.

Choquette published her first book Confidences d'écrivains canadiens-français in 1939. She published her first novel La Coupe Vide in 1948. In 1954, her story collection La nuit ne dort pas was awarded the Prix David. Her 1961 story collection Laure Clouet received the Prix du Grand Jury des lettres.

== Death and legacy ==
She died in Quebec City at the age of 58.

In 1980, the Société des écrivains canadiens de langue française created the Prix Adrienne-Choquette in her honour. Rue Adrienne-Choquette in Saint-Augustin-de-Desmaures was also named after Choquette.

Her former home in Shawinigan has been designated as a Quebec heritage property.
