= Francine Ouellette =

Canadian writer living in Quebec (born 1947)

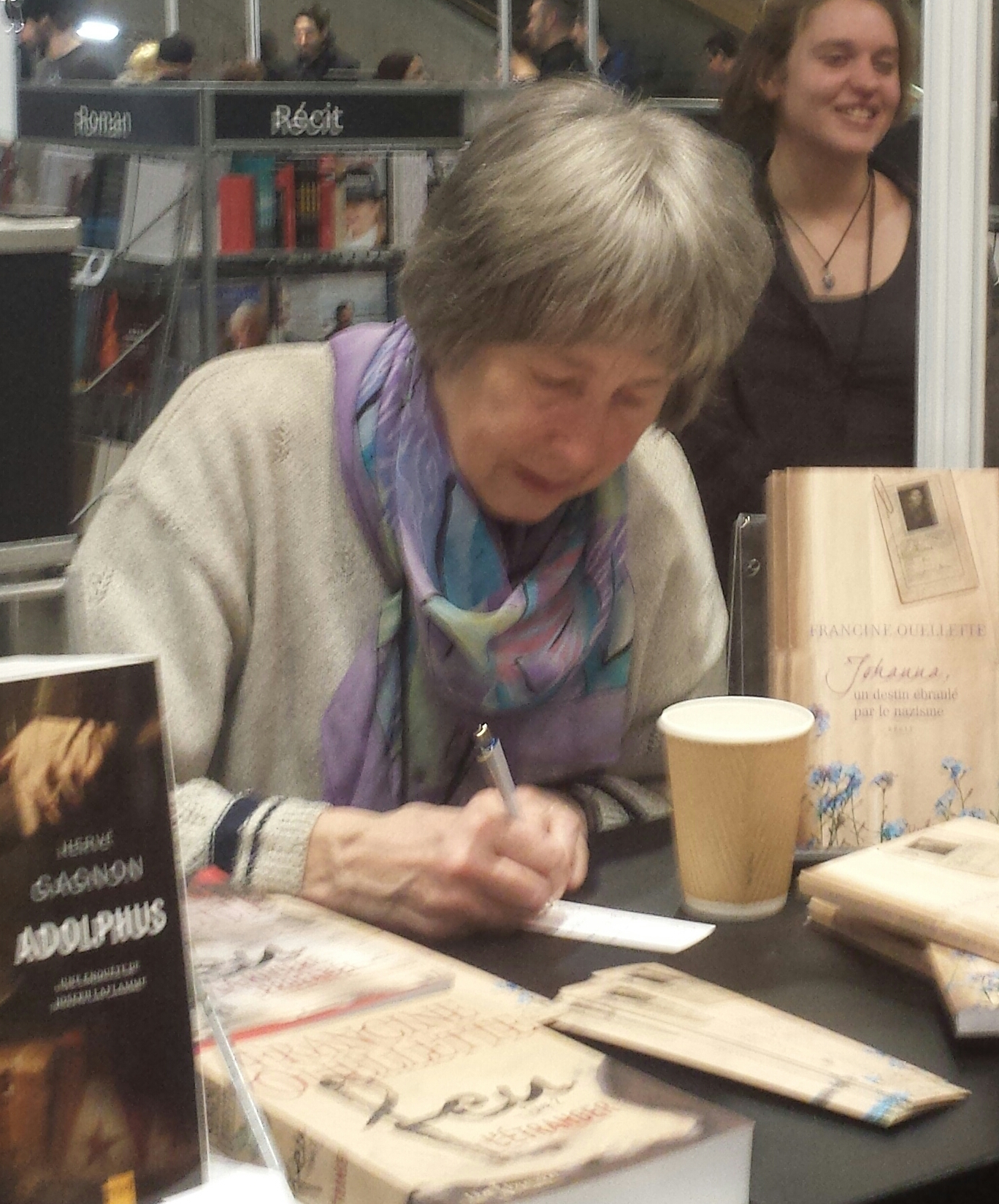
Francine Ouellette in 2018

Francine Ouellette (born March 11, 1947) is a Canadian writer living in Quebec.

She was born in Montreal and was educated at the École des beaux-arts de Montréal. Ouellette taught plastic arts at the École Polyvalente Mont-Laurier. In the 1970s, she left teaching and moved to Schefferville to pursue flying and writing. She wrote Les ailes du destin which was only published some 20 years later. She later moved back to the Mont-Laurier region. In 1984, she published Au nom du père et du fils which became a best-seller and later the basis for a television series; in 1993, it was also awarded the Prix du grand public and the Prix Le Signet d'or for novel of the year. In 2013, she received the Ludger-Duvernay Prize for her collected work.

== Selected works ==
- Le Sorcier, novel (1985), received the Prix Jean-Hamelin
- Sir Gaby du lac, novel (1989), received the Prix Citoyenne de la nature
- Le Grand Blanc, novel (1993), received the Grand Prix des lectrices et des lecteurs du Journal de Montréal
- Bécassine, l’oiseau invisible, youth literature (1999)
- Feu, La rivière profanée, novel (2004), received the Grand prix de la Culture des Laurentides
- Feu, Fleur de lys, novel (2007), received the Prix ANEL-AQPF
