= Monique Deland =

Quebecer poet (born 1958)

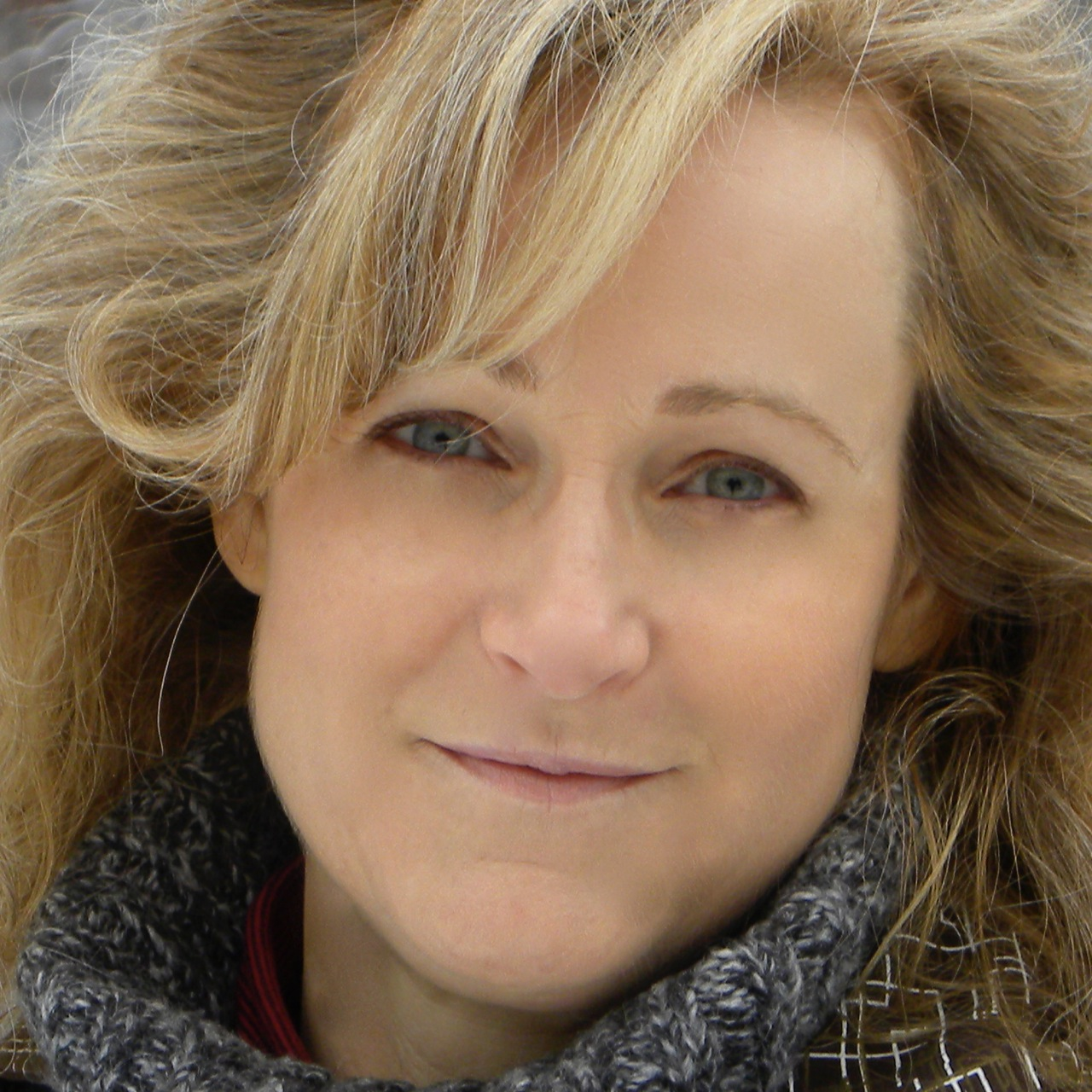
Monique Deland

Monique Deland (born July 6, 1958) is a Quebecer poet. She is a recipient of the Grand Prix de Poésie Le Noroît (1993), Prix Émile-Nelligan (1995), Prix Alain-Grandbois (2009), Prix Félix-Antoine-Savard (2010), and the Grand Prix Quebecor du Festival international de Poésie (2019).

== Biography ==
Monique Deland was born in Montreal and trained as a visual artist. She is the daughter of André Deland, (1926–1979, Geology Professor at Sir George Williams / Concordia University) who taught her the love of science according to her Discours de réception à l'Académie des lettres du Québec and Suzanne Lapointe (sister of Jean Lapointe, a Quebec actor).

From 1978 to 1995, Deland taught visual arts at the high school level. From 1993 to 2002, she earned a masters and doctorate in literary studies at the Université du Québec à Montréal. She won the Prix Québec-Amérique in 1998 for her master's degree thesis Rivages, Pour une esthétique de l'ambivalence.

From 1999 to 2007, she was a member of the editorial team for the poetry magazine Estuaire. She has also been a poetry critic for the literary magazines Trois, Estuaire, Moebius, and Les Écrits. She is now a regular poetry critic for Estuaire, since 2018. Deland is an elected member of the Académie des lettres du Québec, since 2014.

== Awards ==
She received the Grand Prix de Poésie Le Noroît in 1993 for Ta présence à peine. In 1995, she was awarded the Prix Émile-Nelligan for her first poetry book Géants dans l'île, and, in 2009, received the Prix Alain-Grandbois for Miniatures, balles perdues et autres désordres. She also was awarded two prizes from the Festival international de la Poésie at Trois-Rivières : in 2010 the Prix Félix-Antoine-Savard, and in 2019 the Grand Prix Quebecor du Festival international de Poésie for her book J'ignore combien j'ai d'enfants.

== Selected works ==
- Géants dans l'île (1994)
- L'intuition du rivage (2000)
- Le nord est derrière moi (2004)
- Miniatures, balles perdues et autres désordres (2008)
- Géologie des corps surpeuplés (2011)
- La nuit, tous les dieux sont noirs (2014)
- J'ignore combien j'ai d'enfants (2018)
- Noir de suie, Poèmes d'atelier (2023)
