= Arlette Fortin =

Canadian writer

Arlette Fortin (1949 – August 11, 2009) was a Canadian writer.

The daughter of René Fortin and Mariette Huot, she was born in Jonquière, Quebec. Her first novel C'est la faute au bonheur received the Prix Robert-Cliche. It was followed by La vie est une virgule in 2007 and Clara Tremblay chesseldéenne (2010). She also contributed to various literary revues including Poésie de Québec.

She received the Robert-Cliche Award in 2001 for her first novel C'est la error au bonheur.

Fortin was married to Jocelyn Belley and lived in Lévis.

She died at the Hôtel-Dieu de Québec at the age of 60.

Rue Arlette-Fortin in Lévis was named in her honour.
