= Stéfani Meunier =

Canadian writer

Stéfani Meunier (born 1971) is a Canadian writer from Quebec, whose novel Une carte postale de lʼocéan was a shortlisted Governor General's Award nominee for French-language fiction at the 2023 Governor General's Awards.

She won the award for French-language children's literature at the 2024 Governor General's Awards for Une bulle en dehors du temps.

Born and raised in Montreal, she moved to the small town of Saint-Adolphe-d'Howard after completing her education in creative writing at McGill University. She published her debut short story collection Au bout du chemin in 1999, and followed up with her debut novel L'Étrangère in 2005.

== Works ==
- Au bout du chemin - 1999
- L'Étrangère - 2005
- Ce n'est pas une façon de dire adieu - 2007
- Et je te demanderai la mer - 2008
- On ne rentre jamais à la maison - 2013
- La plupart du temps je m'appelle Gabrielle - 2019
- Une carte postale de l'océan - 2023
