= Claire de Lamirande =

Canadian writer and literary critic

Claire de Lamirande (August 6, 1929 – December 15, 2009) was a Canadian writer and literary critic living in Quebec.

She was born Claire Bourget in Sherbrooke, Quebec. She worked as a commercial artist for the newspaper La Tribune in Sherbrooke, then as a secretary for an insurance office. She received a diploma from the Collège du Sacré-Coeur in Sherbrooke and then a master's degree in French literature from the Université de Montréal. She went on to study drawing, painting and sculpture at the École des beaux-arts de Montréal.

In 1950, she married Gaston de Lamirande.

De Lamirande published her first novel Aldébaran ou la fleur in 1968. She contributed to Le Devoir, the Journal of Canadian Fiction, La Nouvelle Barre du jour and Le Droit.

== Selected works ==
- Le Grand élixir (1969)
- La Baguette magique (1971)
- Jeu de clefs (1974)
- La pièce montée (1975)
- Signé de biais (1976)
- L'Opération fabuleuse (1978)
- Papineau ou l'épée à double tranchant (1980)
- L'Occulteur (1982)
- La Rose des temps (1984)
- Voir le jour (1986)
- Neige de mai (1988)
