= Anne Dandurand =

French-Canadian actor, producer, activist and author

Anne Dandurand (born November 19, 1953) is a French-Canadian actor, producer, activist and author. She was born in Montreal, and appeared regularly in Canadian film and TV during the 1970s. She wrote her first book, La louve-garou, with her twin sister writer Claire Dé. She lives in Montreal.

== Selected works ==
=== With Claire Dé ===
- La louve-garou

=== Sole author ===
- La louve-garou (1982)
- Voilà, c'est moi : c'est rien, j'angoisse (Journal imaginaire) (1987)
- L'assassin de l'intérieur. Diables d'espoir (1988)
- Un coeur qui craque (Journal imaginaire) (1990)
- Petites âmes sous ultimatum (1991)
- Les secrets d'Olympia. Les touffes flottantes (1993)
- La salle d'attente (1994)
- La marquise ensanglantée (1996)
- Les porteuses d'ombre (1999)

=== Available in English ===
- The Cracks (translated by Luise von Flotow)
- Deathly Delights (translated by Luise Von Flotow)
- The Waiting Room (translated by Robert Majzels)

== Awards ==
- 1990 Grand Prix de la nouvelle pour la jeunesse
