= Mona Latif-Ghattas =

Egyptian-born Canadian writer (1946–2021)

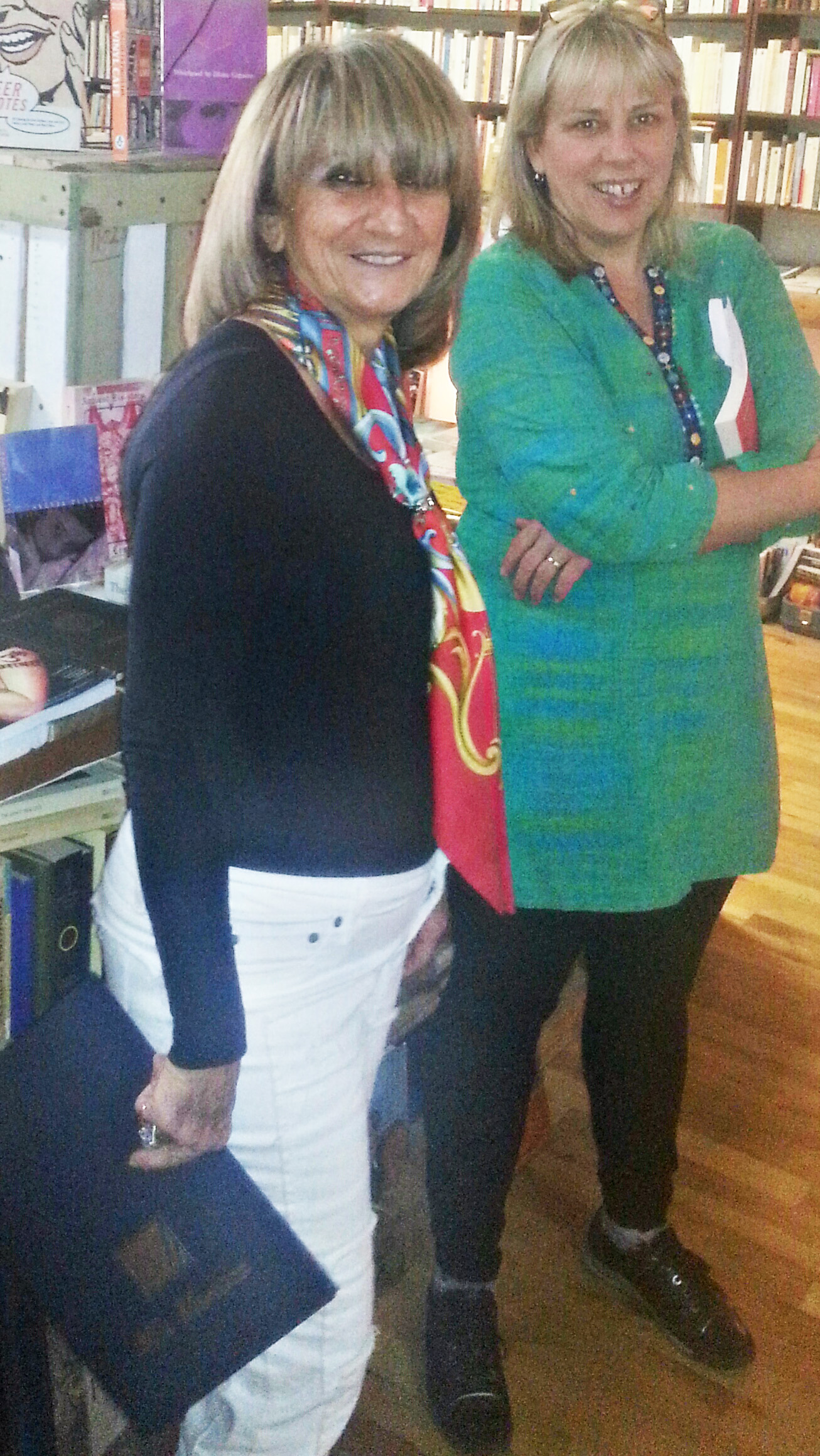
- Born: August 7, 1946; Cairo, Egypt
- Died: December 24, 2021 (aged 75)
- Writing career
- Genres: novel, short story, poetry

Mona Latif-Ghattas (Egyptian Arabic: منى لطيف غطاس; August 7, 1946 - December 24, 2021) was an Egyptian-born Canadian writer living in Montreal, Quebec.

She was born in Cairo. She left Egypt in 1966 and lived in Montreal, studied theatre at the Université du Québec à Montréal and went on to earn a master's degree in drama at the Université de Montréal.

She published her first novel Nicolas, le fils du Nil in 1985 and her first collection of poetry La triste beauté du monde in 1993. In 1996, she published a collection of short stories Les lunes de miel. Her work has appeared in the journals Humanitas, Pratiques Théâtrales and La Nouvelle Barre du jour. Latif-Ghattas' poetry collection Ambre et lumière received the Prix du Salon international des poètes francophones. She has published work in both French and Arabic.

Latif-Ghattas died on December 24, 2021, at the age of 75.
