= Robertine Barry =

French Canadian journalist and publisher (1863–1910)

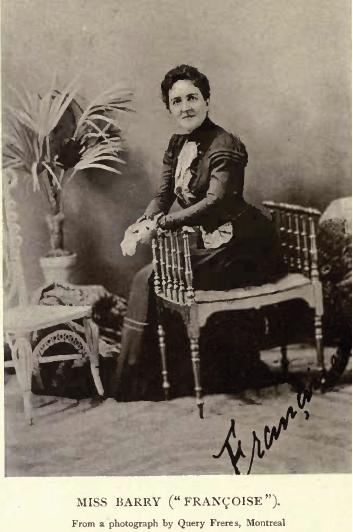
- Robertine Barry (Françoise) by Query Freres, Quebec
- Born: Robertine Barry; 26 February 1863; Les Escoumins, Province of Canada
- Died: 7 January 1910 (aged 46); Montreal, Quebec
- Occupation: journalist publisher

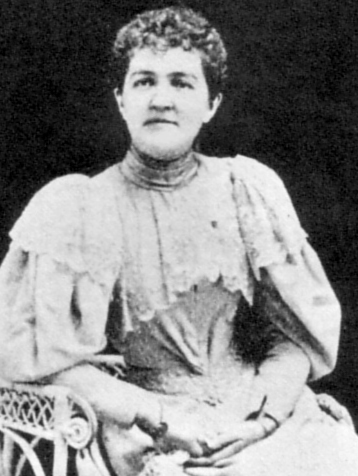
Robertine Barry.

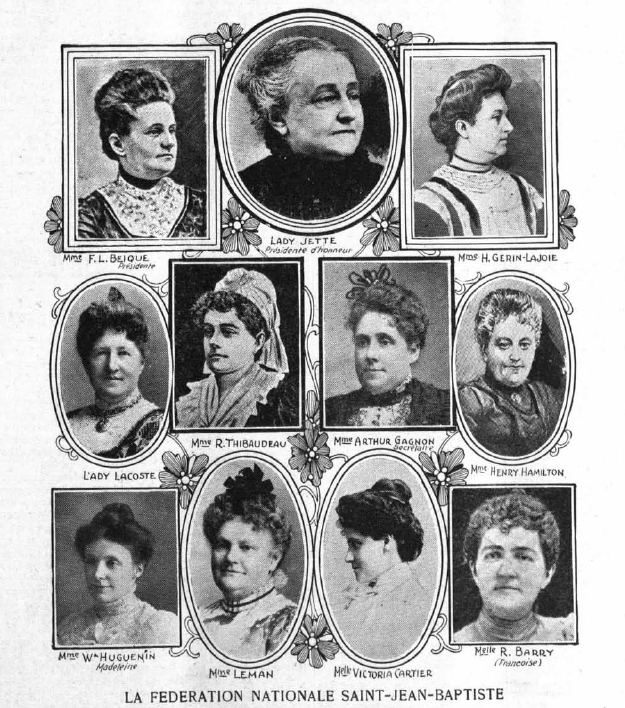
Robertine Barry was a member of the first presidential board, of the Fédération nationale Saint-Jean-Baptiste, Montréal, 1907.

Robertine Barry (26 February 1863 – 7 January 1910), pseudonym Françoise, was an early French Canadian journalist and publisher and a popular member of Montreal society.

== Early life ==
Robertine Barry was born in L'Île-Verte, Lower Canada to John Edmond Barry and Aglaée Rouleau. The couple had thirteen children.

John Edmond Barry eventually rose to local political prominence.

Aglaée Rouleau was a native of L'Île-Verte.

Barry attended elementary school in Les Escoumins from 1868 to 1873, and was a day student at the Couvent Jésus-Marie in Trois-Pistoles. From September 1880 to July 1882 she wrote for the student newspaper while at boarding school in Quebec. Barry often felt stifled by the rules of convent education and was often reprimanded for bad behavior. Barry graduated at age 20.

Barry was not interested in marriage. As she explained, "I am not among those who consider marriage as the goal to which must be devoted a lifetime of noble efforts."

== Career ==
Inspired by the success of French journalist Séverine, Barry set her sights on a career as a journalist.

In 1891, Barry published her first pieces for La Patrie of Montreal under the pen name Françoise. The name honored Saint Francis de Sales and indirectly honored Barry's sister Evelyn who had taken holy orders on the feast day of Francis de Sales.

Barry's first article was on the importance of female education and it challenged the Catholic Church's control over schools. The article set off a firestorm. Honoré Beaugrand was her editor.

From 21 September 1891 to 5 March 1900, Barry wrote a weekly column for La Patrie under her pen name. Barry was the first French-Canadian woman hired to work full-time by a Quebec newspaper.

During the summer of 1895, Barry vacationed in Halifax and spotted the bell of the Fortress of Louisbourg in a local pharmacy. Barry used her column in La Patrie to organize a successful fundraising campaign to buy the bell. The bell is currently displayed at the Chateau de Ramezay.

Barry published Le Journal de Françoise, a bimonthly review from 1902 to 1909. The magazine, subtitled "Le Gazette canadienne de la famille", offered a wide variety of features intended primarily for women. The magazine also reflected Barry's interest in literature, publishing works of distinguished Quebec writers such as Laure Conan, Juliette Adam, Marie Gérin-Lajoie, Louis Fréchette and Émile Nelligan. Many female journalists in Quebec got their first break writing for Le Journal de Françoise.

== Legacy ==
Barry is one of eight finalists for the $5 polymer bills in Canada.
