= Monique LaRue =

Canadian writer (born 1948)

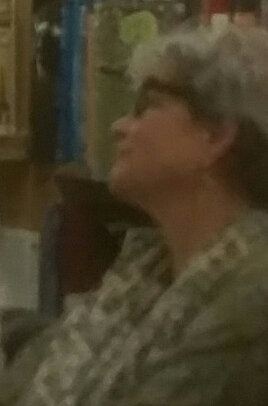
Monique LaRue, 2017

Monique LaRue (born April 3, 1948) is a Quebec writer.

== Biography ==
The daughter of Therese Cloutier and Jean-Paul LaRue, she was born in Longueuil and was educated in Montreal at the Collège Jésus-Marie, the Collège Marie-de-France and the Université de Montréal, and at the École des hautes études in Paris. She has taught literature and French at the Cégep Édouard-Montpetit for more than 30 years. LaRue is a member of the Académie des lettres du Québec. She has sat on juries for various literary prizes, including the Prix Émile-Nelligan, the Prix Athanase-David, the Governor General's Literary Awards and the Grand prix littéraire de la ville de Montréal (serving as chair for three years).

LaRue published her first novel La Cohorte fictive in 1979. She has written literary commentary for Spirale and other publications.

== Selected works ==
- Les Faux fuyants, novel (1982)
- Plages, stories (1986)
- L'Aventure, la mésaventure, stories (1987)
- Promenades littéraires dans Montréal (1989) with Jean-François Chassay
- Copies conformes, novel (1990), received the Grand prix du livre de Montréal
- La démarche du crabe, novel (1996), received the Prix du Journal de Montréal
- La gloire de Cassiodore, novel (2002), received the Governor General's Award for French-language fiction
- De fil en aiguille, collected essays (2006)
- L'œil de Marquise, novel (2009), received the Prix Jacques-Cartier du roman de langue française
