= Lisa Carducci =

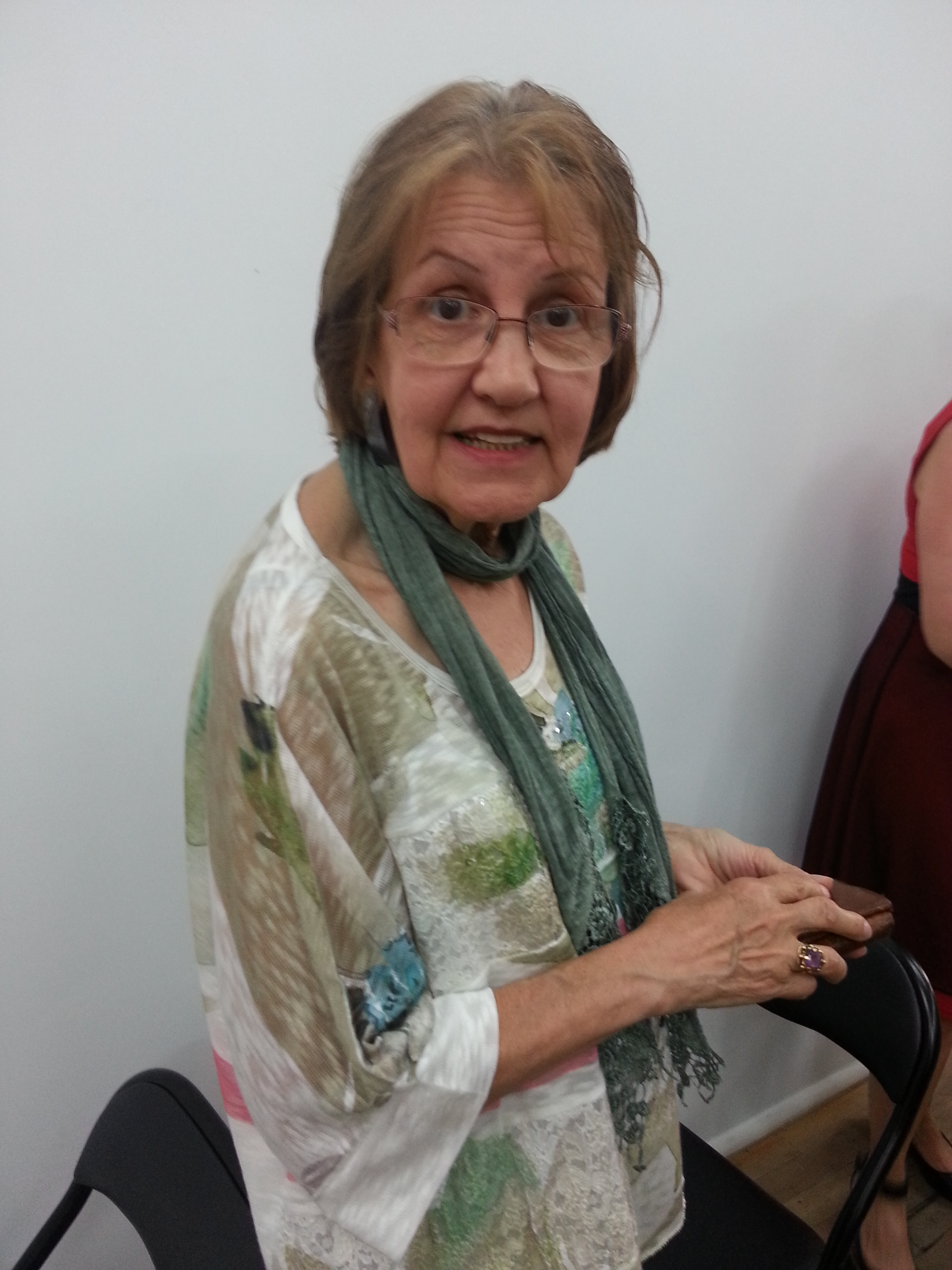
- Born: May 22, 1943 (age 83); Montreal, Quebec, Canada
- Writing career
- Language: French, Italian, English
- Genres: poetry, novel, essay

Lisa Carducci, also Li, Shasha; Li, Sha; 李沙莎; 李莎 (born May 22, 1943) is a Canadian writer of Italian descent living in China.

The daughter of a father whose parents were immigrants from Italy, she was born in Montreal, Quebec. She received a BEd from the University of Montreal in 1963. She has taught languages, theatre and history, first in Montreal and, since 1991, in China.

In 1985, Carducci published her first collection of poetry Les Héliotropes and a collection of short stories Nouvelles en couleurs. In 1988, she received the Prix San Giuliano (Milan) for L'Ultima Fede (The Last Faith, Italian) and the Prix Anne de la Vigne from the Société culturelle Québec-Normandie. In 1990, Carducci received the Prix Il Trovatore (Sicily) for Vorrei and, in 1992, the Prix Città di Ragusa for Amore di porcellana. In 1993, she received first prize of the Grand Prix littéraire de Laval for Une lettre. She received the Trofeo Mediterraneo 1998 from the Académie internationale des Micenei (Calabria). In 2004, she received the Prix de l'Altéralité for Pays inconnu / Paese sconosciuto and the Prix international de poésie S. Domenichino (awarded for Italian poetry written outside Italy) for Il Domani. In 2009, she received Le Mot d'Or de la Traduction francophone for the translation with Yan Hansheng of Le Totem du loup from Jiang Rong's novel Láng Túténg. In 2015, she received the Special Book Award of China, awarded by the Chinese government for foreigners studying Chinese literature.

Carducci has worked as a consultant for CCTV and as a translator, columnist and editor for the Beijing Review. She also has contributed to the Canadian Italian-language weekly Il Cittadino Canadese.

Carducci speaks fluent English, French, Italian, Spanish and Mandarin.

In 2005, she received her Permanent Residence Card for China.
