= Valérie Harvey =

Canadian writer

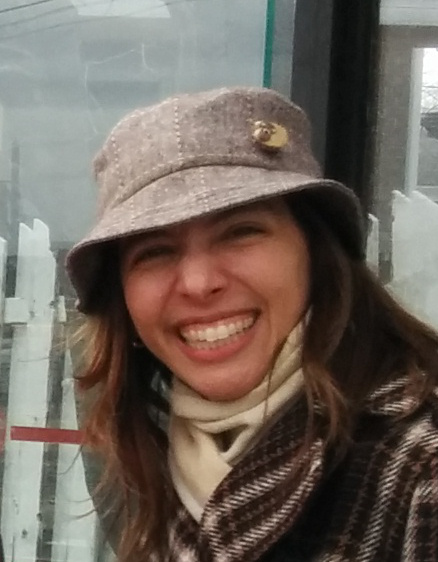
Valérie Harvey in 2015

Valérie Harvey (born 1979) is a Canadian writer and sociologist from Quebec, associate professor at the University of Quebec in Outaouais (School of Languages and Cultures) where she teaches a course on manga and Japanese society. Her main interest is Japan, where she lived for several years (in Kyoto), with six publications devoted to the country. She completed a postdoctoral fellowship in sociology at Konan University (Kobe, Japan) in 2022-2023, focusing on the Japanese family.

She is sociologist on Ici Radio-Canada Première's Ça prend un village, a program for which she is also a researcher. She teaches Japanese at Collège Saint-Charles-Garnier in Quebec City. She has also translated the poet Misuzu Kaneko into French, published by Québec Amérique.

== Biography ==
Valérie Harvey was born in 1979, in La Malbaie, Charlevoix region of Quebec. She studied there until CEGEP, where she specialized in arts and literature. She continued in this vein at the Université de Sherbrooke, where she obtained her first bachelor's degree in Francophone literature, followed by a second bachelor's degree in communications and multimedia. At the same time, she studied several languages, which led her to Japanese.

In 2003, she started her travel blog "Nomadesse". In 2006, she left Quebec to spend a year in Kyoto, Japan. In 2010, Hamac-Carnets published her first book on Japan, the travel journal, Passion Japon (Passion Japon). She went on to write several novels set in a northern Japanese world for Québec Amérique. She returned to school in 2009 to complete a master's degree in sociology at Université Laval on Japanese women's desire to have children. Her doctorate in sociology focused on Quebec fathers and parental leave.

She was a sociologist with Éclaireurs, as well as at the Humanistes table, on Radio-Canada's Médium large program.

As a singer and songwriter, she was a member of the duo Yume, which composed and performed songs in Japanese and French.

== Awards and honours ==
- 2021, Special prize from the NHK Nodo Jiman show - Let's Sing Japanese Songs of the NHK World
- 2020, Finalist, Literary Creation Prize from the City of Quebec and the Quebec International Book Fair pour L'Ombre du Shinobi
- 2018, Parallel Universes Literary Prize, for Les Fleurs du Nord
- 2018, Finalist, Prix Adolecteurs, for Les Fleurs du Nord

== Selected works ==
- Passion Manga, Du Japon au monde, Presses de l'Université du Québec, 2026 ISBN 9782760563193
- Passion Japon - Sur les chemins de Kyoto, Somme toute, 2025 ISBN 9782897945206
- Révolution Papa, Comment les pères québécois transforment la masculinité, Québec Amérique, 2021 ISBN 978-2-7644-4282-1
- Série Hokkaidô, Québec Amérique, collection Magellan:

- Les Fleurs du Nord, 2016; 2nd edition, 2019 ISBN 978-2-7644-3929-6
- L'Ombre du Shinobi, 2019 ISBN 978-2-7644-3770-4
- L'Héritage du Kami, 2020 ISBN 978-2-7644-4000-1

- Nous sommes tous différents et nous sommes tous beaux, translation of the poetry by Misuzu Kaneko, Québec Amérique, 2019 ISBN 978-2-7644-3743-8
- Série Idole, Les éditions Nomadesse:

- Idole - Anna de Charlevoix, 2017
- Idole 2 - Anna de nulle part, 2019

- L'amour au cœur de la vie: 15 regards sur l'amour (under the direction of Valérie Harvey), Québec Amérique, 2017 ISBN 978-2-7644-3347-8
- Passion Islande, Hamac-carnets, 2016 ISBN 978-2-8944-8845-4
- La Pomme de Justine, Québec Amérique, 2013 ISBN 978-2-7644-1690-7
- Le pari impossible des Japonaises. Enquête sur le désir d'enfant au Japon, Septentrion, 2012 ISBN 978-2-8944-8704-4
- Les découvertes de Papille au Japon, Chenelière, 2012 ISBN 978-2-8947-1429-4
- Passion Japon: Voyage au cœur du Japon moderne, Hamac-carnets, 2010 ISBN 978-2-8944-8618-4
