= Lysette Brochu =

French-Canadian writer

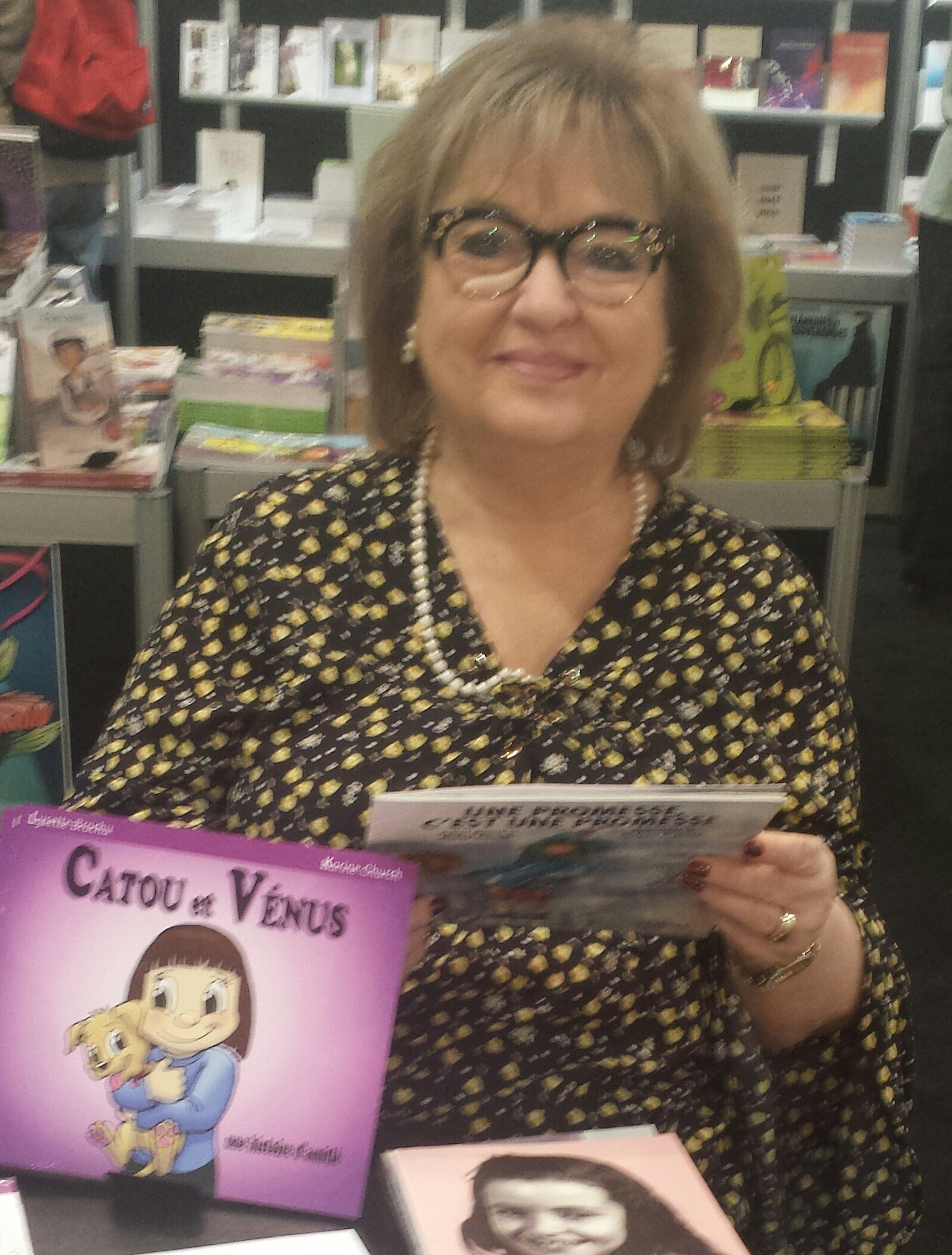
Lysette Brochu in 2018

Lysette Brochu (born 1946) is a French-Canadian writer. She was born in Greater Sudbury, Ontario, Canada and was educated at the University of Ottawa. She received her certification for teaching in Ontario and also studied theology. She earned a MEd with concentration in education counselling. Brochu taught secondary school and at Saint Paul University and at the Université du Québec en Outaouais.

From 1998 to 2003, she was president of the Atelier littéraire des Outaouais. Brochu also wrote on cultural topics for La Revue de Gatineau. She contributed to a number of collections including La cendre des mots (2003), Le Tunnel (2007), Des nouvelles du hasard (2004) and Histoires d'amitié (2009). Brochu also was a contributor to several cultural magazines including Entre-parenthèses, Virages, Traversées, Brèves littéraires, Ancrages, Pastorale Québec and Écrire.

== Selected works ==
- Marie-France et son ange (2001)
- Saisons d'or et d'argile, tableaux de vie, story collection (2003)
- Florence et la Sainte-Catherine, children's book (2005), chosen by International Board on Books for Young People Canada at the Nami Island International Children's Book Festival 2006
- Pas de deux, poetry collection with Daniel Paradis (2008)
- Tête froide, youth story collection (2009)
