= Karoline Georges =

Canadian writer (born 1970)

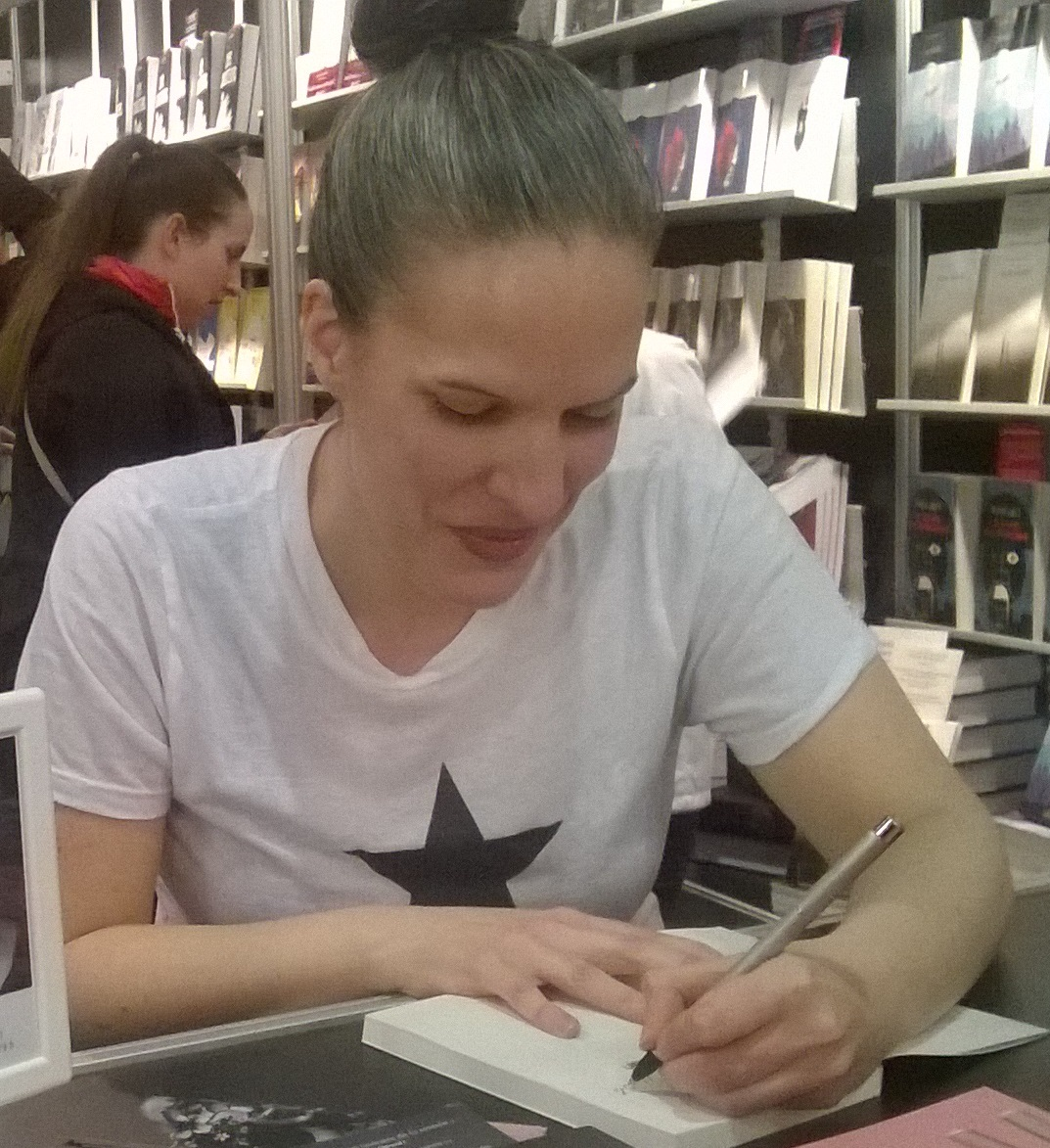
- Born: 22 June 1970 (age 56); Montreal, Quebec, Canada
- Occupations: Novelist, artist
- Writing career
- Period: 2000s–present
- Notable work: De synthèse

Karoline Georges (born 22 June 1970) is a Canadian novelist and multidisciplinary artist from Quebec. Her work spans literature, visual arts, digital art, video and immersive installation. Her novel De synthèse won the Governor General's Award for French-language fiction at the 2018 Governor General's Awards.

She studied art and film at the Université du Québec à Chicoutimi, and art history at the Université du Québec à Montréal. Her debut novel, La Mue de l'hermaphrodite, was published in 2001, and she has since published novels, short stories, poetry and children's literature.

De synthèse won the Prix Jacques-Brossard in 2018. It was selected for the 2019 edition of Le Combat des livres, where it was defended by broadcaster Manal Drissi.

== Artistic practice ==
In addition to her literary work, Georges has developed a multidisciplinary artistic practice involving sound and kinetic poetry, photography, choreography, video installation and digital media. Her work has been presented internationally in festivals, biennials and exhibitions devoted to contemporary art, digital media and video poetry.

Her video work Repères combines architectural landscapes with poetic fragments, creating a videopoetic encounter between documentary imagery, fiction and virtual presence. The work was presented at the Rencontres Internationales Paris/Berlin/Madrid at the Palais de Tokyo in Paris in 2012 and at the Haus der Kulturen der Welt in Berlin in 2013. It was also presented at the Biennale internationale d'art contemporain de Carthagène des Indes, the FILE Electronic Language International Festival in São Paulo, La Bande Vidéo in Quebec City and the Maison des écrivains in Montreal, and was selected for the 2017 Lumen Prize longlist.

In the 2020s, Georges's digital art practice increasingly incorporated artificial intelligence, virtuality and moving image. In 2025, her work was included in Latent Spaces, a collective exhibition at ELEKTRA Gallery in Montreal devoted to AI-based generative video. In 2026, her series The Post-Brocart Chamber was included in The Machine's Eye in Human Hands at Fotografiska Stockholm, an exhibition devoted to generative artificial intelligence and contemporary image-making.

== Works ==
=== Novels ===
- La Mue de l'hermaphrodite, 2001
- Ataraxie, 2004
- Sous béton, 2011 (English translation Under the Stone, 2016)
- De synthèse, 2017 (English translation The Imago Stage, 2020)

=== Short stories ===
- Variations endogènes, 2014

=== Children's literature ===
- L'Itinérante qui venait du Nord, 2003

=== Poetry ===
- (l'individualiste), 2006
