= Claire Dé =

Canadian writer

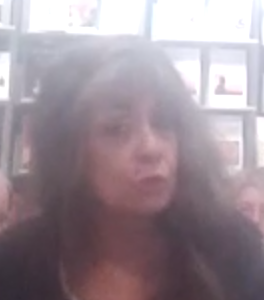
Claire Dé in 2019

Claire Dé is the pen name of Claire Dandurand (born November 19, 1953), a Canadian writer from Quebec.

The twin sister of writer Anne Dandurand, she worked as a theatrical designer before devoting herself to writing. She began her career as co-author with her sister of La louve-garou, a collection of erotic short stories published in 1982, and then wrote a number of theatre pieces in the 1980s. In 1989 she published Le désir comme catastrophe naturelle, another collection of erotic stories which won the Prix Stendhal.

In 1991, she published Chiens divers (et autres faits ecrasés), a short story collection, and Sentimental a l'os, a collection of some of her theatrical plays. She published the novels Sourdes amours in 1993 and Bonheur, oiseau rare in 1996, which were subsequently republished in English translations by Lazer Lederhendler as Soundless Loves (1997) and The Sparrow Has Cut the Day in Half (1999). At the 1999 Governor General's Awards, Lederhendler was shortlisted for the Governor General's Award for French to English translation for The Sparrow Has Cut the Day in Half.

At the 2004 Governor General's Awards, Dé was shortlisted for the Governor General's Award for English to French translation for Le cahier d'Hellman, her translation of Hellman's Scrapbook by Robert Majzels.

In 2011, Dé published the short story collection Hôtel Septième-ciel.
