= Marie Savard =

Canadian writer (1936-2012)

Marie Savard (August 15, 1936 – January 16, 2012) was a Canadian writer living in Quebec.

The daughter of Paul Savard and Germaine Collin, she was born in Quebec City, Quebec. In 1965, she published her first poetry collection Les Coins de l'Ove. In the same year, she released a self-titled recording of songs/poems. From 1961 to 1966, she wrote a number of scripts for children for Radio-Canada. Savard also wrote a number of scripts for radio broadcasts, including Bien à moi which was first broadcast in 1969 and later rebroadcast in France, Belgium, Switzerland and Luxembourg. Her work appeared in various literary magazines such as Liberté, La barre du jour, Sorcières (Paris), Moebius, LittéRéalité (York University), Arcade and l'Arbre à Paroles.

In 1974, she established Éditions de la Pleine Lune, the first publishing house in Quebec dedicated to women.

Savard died in Montreal at the age of 75.
