= Michèle Mailhot =

Canadian writer

Michèle Mailhot (January 8, 1932 – January 2009) was a Quebec writer.

The daughter of Arthur Asselin and Gabrielle Payette, she was born Michèle Asselin in Montreal and went on to earn a BA and a Bachelor of Education from the Université de Montréal. She taught for several years and then worked as a journalist for Points de vue, Le Nouveau Journal and Radio-Canada. From 1961 to 1965, Mailhot was literary critic for Châtelaine. From 1969 to 1971, she was vice-director of the Presses universitaires de Montréal. From 1972 to 1972, she was literary adviser for the publishing house Éditions du Jour. From 1976 to 1977, she was editor for the publishing house Éditions de l'Étincelle. Mailhot also worked as a reader for various publishing houses. She wrote a number of short stories for the magazines Liberté, La Barre du Jour and The Massachusetts Review.

In 1964, she published her first novel Dis-moi que je vis. Her novel Veuillez agréer..., published in 1975, received the Prix de la Presse in 1975; it was translated into English as Coming of age in 1988.

Mailhot died in Outremont at the age of 77 after an extended illness.

== Selected works ==
- Le Fou de la reine (1969)
- La mort de l'araignée (1972), translated into English as Death of the spider (1991)
- La vie arrachée (1984)
- Notes de parcours (1986)
- Béatrice vue d'en bas (1988), received the Grand Prix de la prose from the Journal de Montréal
- Le passé composé (1990), was shortlisted for the Governor General's Award for French-language fiction in 1990
