= Aurore Dessureault-Descôteaux =

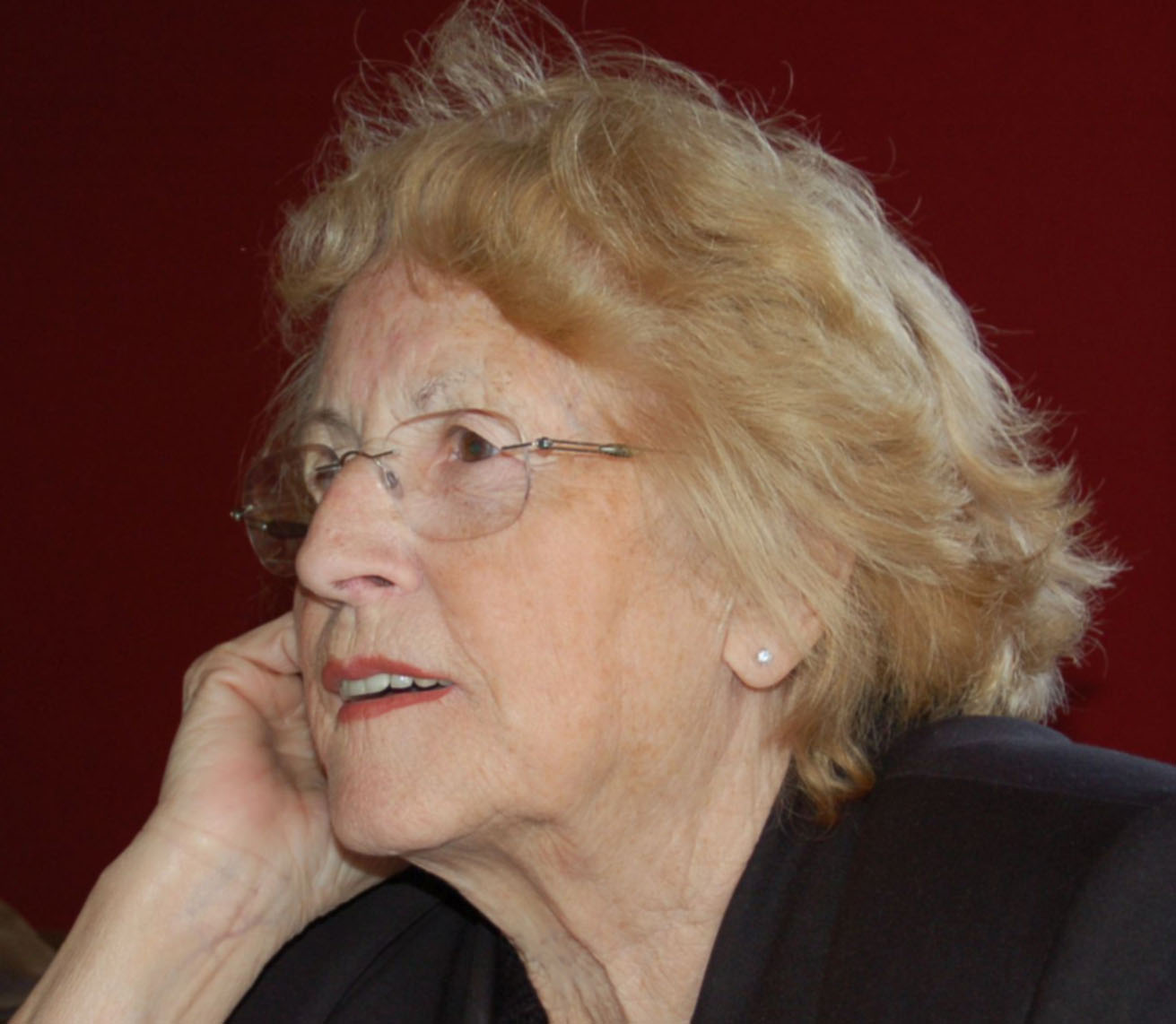
Aurore Dessureault-Descôteaux

Aurore Dessureault-Descôteaux (May 10, 1926 – April 24, 2015) was a writer in Quebec, Canada. She was perhaps best known as the author of the téléroman Entre chien et loup.

She was born Aurore Dessureault in Saint-Narcisse. She married Rosario Descôteaux, who died in 1999. The couple had eight children. Her son Gilles is an actor.

She wrote three plays: Marche par-là Graziela, Du foin pour les Mongrain and La revanche de Graziela, a novel Entre Chien et Loup and a history of her birthplace, St-Narcisse, Histoire du Troisième Rang – En suivant les roulières. She also helped establish the first municipal library at Grand-Mère. During the 1990s, Dessureault-Descôteaux published a column "Le Signe des temps" in Le Nouvelliste.

In 1969, she was named Madame Châtelaine by the magazine Châtelaine.

Dessureault-Descôteaux died in Grand-Mère at the age of 88.
