= Claudine Bertrand =

Canadian educator and poet

- Born: 4 July 1948 (age 78); Montreal

Claudine Bertrand (born 4 July 1948) is a Quebec educator and poet.

== Life ==
Bertrand was born in Montreal and studied at the Université du Québec à Montréal, where she received a Master's degree in literary studies. Bertrand taught literature at college level from 1973. She contributed to a number of magazines, including Montréal now!, La Nouvelle Barre du jour, Les Écrits, Hobo- Québec, Possibles, Rampike, Moebius, Estuaire, Écritures, Tessera, Bacchanales and Acte Sud. In 1981, Bertrand founded the magazine Arcade, later recognized for its contributions to cultural exchange between Quebec and France. She created the Prix de la relève Arcade in 1991. She also contributed to the French literary magazines Le Jardin d'Essai, Travers and Pourtours.

== Awards and honours ==
In 1996, she was a finalist for the Grand Prix du Conseil des Arts de la Communauté urbaine de Montréal for her contributions to the Montreal cultural scene. In 1997, she received the Prix Femme de mérite, in the arts and culture section. In 2010, she was awarded the Grand Prix international des poètes francophones for her collected work.

== Selected works ==
=== Poetry collections ===
- Idole errante (1983)
- Memory (1985)
- Fiction-nuit (1987)
- La Passion au féminin (1994)
- Une main contre le délire (1995), finalist for the Grand Prix du festival international de poésie
- L'Amoureuse intérieure, suivi de La montagne sacrée (1997), received the Prix de la Société des écrivains canadiens and the Prix de la Renaissance française
- La Dernière Femme (2000)
- Le Corps en tête (2001), received the Prix Tristan-Tzara
- L'Énigme du futur (2001), received the Prix international Saint-Denys-Garneau
- The Last Woman (2008), translated into English
- Autour de l'obscur (2008)
