= Union des écrivaines et des écrivains québécois =

Professional union of writers in Québec

L'Union des écrivaines et des écrivains québécois (UNEQ; English: Québec Union of Writers) is a professional union of writers in Québec, Canada.

Founded on March 21, 1977 by some 50 writers following the leadership of Jacques Godbout, it represents today some 1,200 writers (poets, novelists, drama authors, essayists, authors of scientific and practical works). Its stated mission is to promote Québec literature and defend the social and economic rights of persons of the literary profession.

== Board of directors ==
- Stanley Péan, president
- Danièle Simpson, vice-president
- Sylvain Campeau, secretary-treasurer
- Sylvain Meunier, administrator
- François Jobin, administrator
- Nadia Ghalem, administrator
- Renaud Longchamps, administrator and representative of regions outside Montreal

== See also ==
- Quebec literature
- List of writers from Quebec
