= Harry Gideonse =

Dutch-born American economist (b. 1901, d. 1985)

Harry David Gideonse
- Born: May 17, 1901; Rotterdam, Netherlands
- Died: March 12, 1985 (aged 83); Port Jefferson, New York, US
- Education: Columbia University (B.S., 1923; A.M., 1924); the University of Geneva (Graduate Institute of International Studies), 1928)
- Known for: Second President of Brooklyn College (1939-1966); Chancellor of the New School for Social Research (1966-1975)
- Predecessor: William Boylan
- Successor: Francis Kilcoyne
- Board member of: Chairman of the Board of Freedom House; Chairman of the Board of the Woodrow Wilson Foundation
- Spouse: Edmee Koch
- Children: 2

Harry David Gideonse (May 17, 1901 – March 12, 1985) was a Dutch-born American economist. He was the second President of Brooklyn College, from 1939 to 1966, and Chancellor of the New School for Social Research from 1966 until 1975.

== Early and personal life and education ==
Gideonse was born in Rotterdam, Netherlands, to Martin Cornelius and Johanna Jacoba Helena Magdalena (de Lange) Gideonse. His family emigrated to the United States in 1904, settling in Rochester, New York, where Gidonese attended elementary school.

He married Edmee Koch, of Geneva, Switzerland. They had two sons.

He attended Columbia University (B.S. in economics, 1923; A.M. in Economics, 1924), and the University of Geneva's Graduate Institute of International Studies (1928).

== Biography ==
At Rutgers University, beginning in 1928 he was as assistant professor of economics. At the University of Chicago, Gideonse was an associate professor of economics. He also taught economics at Barnard College (where he was Chairman of the Departments of Economics from 1938 to 1939 and Sociology) and Columbia University.

Gideonse was the second President of Brooklyn College, from 1939 to 1966. During his tenure Brooklyn College was one of the top colleges in the US in terms of the number of alumni receiving doctorate degrees. In the 1940s Gideonse made novel changes in the college curriculum with a greater emphasis on electives, an approach that later became standard in colleges. In May 1983, Brooklyn College renamed its library in his honor.

He was Chancellor of the New School for Social Research from 1966 until 1975, when he retired.

Gideonse wrote Transfert des réparations et le plan Dawes (1928), The International Bank, The Higher Learning in a Democracy, The Economic Policy of the United States, Introductory General Course in the Study of Contemporary Society (1939), American Policy in Indonesia (1949), The economic foreign policy of the United States (1953), On the Educational Statesmanship of a Free Society (1959), Against the Running Tide (1967), and The Year 2000: The Future Planners and Education (1969), and co-wrote a number of other books.

He served on the executive committee of the Chicago Council on Foreign Relations. He was chairman of the board for a number of years of Freedom House and the Woodrow Wilson Foundation. He was a member of the anti-Castro organization, Citizens Committee for a Free Cuba.

Gideonse, who had lived in Great Neck, New York, and in East Setauket, New York, died on March 12, 1985, at the age of 83 in the Port Jefferson New York Nursing Home, three weeks after his wife died.

== Selected publications ==
- Gideonse, Harry D. (1939). Gideonse, Harry D. (ed.). Organized Scarcity and Public Policy. Chicago, IL: The University of Chicago Press (Public Policy Pamphlet No. 30) – via Internet Archive.
- Preminger, Alexander S.; Ciolli, Antoinette; Lester, Lillian (1970). Urban Educator: Harry Gideonse, Brooklyn College and City University of New York: An Annotated Bibliography. 1970: Twayne Publishers, Inc. – via Internet Archive.
