= Dorothy Inez Adams =

American anthroplogist (1904–1967)

Dorothy Inez Adams (1904-1967) was an American anthropologist. She was an instructor in the anthropology department at Fisk University and a professor of anthropology at Brooklyn College in New York City, New York. Her field notes detail her work in race relations.

== Early life ==
Dorothy Inez Adams, known as Inez Adams, was born on May 7, 1904, in Santa Barbara, California to Williams and Dorothy Adams. She earned a master's degree in anthropology from the University of California at Berkeley in 1928. Adams then earned her Ph.D. in anthropology from Columbia University in 1950. Her advisor at Columbia was Dr. Ralph Linton, an important figure in the development of cultural anthropology.

== Career ==
Inez Adams was invited to work at Fisk University by Bonita Valien. She was employed from 1949 until the anthropology department was removed in 1951. She was active in the Institute of Race Relations of Fisk University, which was established in 1942. The institute conducted research and fostered discussion about racial disparity in the U.S. and would later help develop strategies for desegregation in schools, employment, and the military. She would become an anthropology professor at Brooklyn College in New York City, New York. She studied race relations, spending time in Trinidad, Nigeria, and the American South. Adams conducted fieldwork during the Civil Rights era, focusing on desegregation in schools, buses and restaurants. As a white woman, she was able to obtain unfiltered opinions from white citizens during the Birmingham bus boycotts (1956-1958). Her observations provided additional perspectives on the attitudes and issues leading to the boycotts.

== Works ==
- Adams, Dorothy Inez (1969). The Role of Rice Ritual in Southeast Asia. Columbia University.
- Adams, Dorothy Inez (1928). North American Indian Basketry Hats. University of California, Berkeley.
