= William Boylan =

American academic administrator (1869–1940)

William Aloysius Boylan
- Born: January 6, 1869; New York City, US
- Died: July 8, 1940 (aged 71)
- Education: St. Francis Xavier College (B.A. and M.A.); New York University (Master of Pedagogy); Fordham University (Doctor of Philosophy)
- Occupation: President of Brooklyn College
- Known for: First President of Brooklyn College
- Successor: Harry Gideonse

William Aloysius Boylan (January 6, 1869 – July 8, 1940) was the first President of Brooklyn College.

== Career ==
Boylan was born in New York City, to Arthur and Anne Boylan. He attended St. Francis Xavier College (B.A. and M.A.), New York University (Master of Pedagogy), and Fordham University (Doctor of Philosophy).

In his career, he was District Superintendent of Schools (beginning in 1913) and Associate Superintendent of Schools, with the New York City Board of Education (beginning in 1927).

Jimmy Walker, the Mayor of New York City, appointed Boylan the first President of Brooklyn College in May 1930. Boylan resigned as President and retired in September 1938 due to illness, as he was suffering from neuritis, and died on July 8, 1940, at 71 years of age. He is buried in Calvary Cemetery in Queens, New York.

He wrote textbooks on reading, writing, and mathematics. Boylan co-authored City Arithmetics, Charles E. Merrill Company (1916), Correct Spelling for Graded Schools, Laurel Book Company (1929), and Graded Drill Exercises in Corrective English, Noble and Noble, Incorporated (1939).

Boylan Hall, on the campus of Brooklyn College, was originally called the “Academic Building,” and was later named after Boylan.

Preceded by	President of Brooklyn College; 1932–1938	Succeeded by Harry Gideonse
