= Marion Vera Cuthbert =

American poet

Marion Vera Cuthbert (1896 – 1989) was an American writer and intellectual associated with the Harlem Renaissance.

== Early life ==
Cuthbert was born in St. Paul, Minnesota. She received her bachelor's degree from Boston University in 1920. She subsequently became principal of Burrel Normal School, then Dean of Women at Talladega College. In 1933, she delivered an address at the NAACP national convention entitled "Honesty in Race Relations." Cuthbert later received her master's degree and Doctorate from Columbia University. Her dissertation, titled "Education and Marginality: A Study of the Negro College Graduate," was a sociological study of the effects of education on the lives of African-American women. She published a volume of poetry, as well as essays in Opportunity: A Journal of Negro Life.

== Career ==
Cuthbert served as dean of women at Talladega College from 1927 to 1930, and from 1928 to 1931, she completed a master's in psychology at Columbia University during the summers. She got her PhD from Columbia Teacher's College in 1942. Cuthbert turned down Charles S. Johnson's offer to teach at Fisk University in favor of a position at Brooklyn College, where she worked from 1944 to 1961 and where was the first black woman to serve as dean of women. In an oral history, Olivia Pearl Stokes mentions Dr. Cuthbert was considered for presidency of Spelman College.

After Cuthbert retired to Plainfield, NH, she authored numerous volumes of poetry, children's books, and short stories, some of which are anthologized.

=== Research ===
Dr. Cuthbert's research on black female college graduates, represented in her work Education and Marginality: A Study of the Negro College Graduate, fills a vacuum in literature about the experiences of black college graduates during the 1930s and 1940s. Her work complements that of Charles S. Johnson's study The Negro College Graduate published in 1938. Her dissertation focused on the experiences of black females at the intersection of race, gender and culture in context of college attainment. She conducted a comparative survey study of the experiences of black females who attained a college degree against those who never attended. Martin D. Jenkins critiques her work by claiming that while the focus on black females in college is critical, her methodology is not strong enough to make the work generalizable to the black experience.

== Selected works ==
- Cuthbert, Marion Vera (1934). Juliette Derricotte. New York, N.Y., The Woman's Press.
- Cuthbert, Marion Vera (1949). Songs of Creation. New York, Woman's Press.
