= Adele Bildersee =

American educator and author

Adele Bildersee (1883–1971) was an American educator and author.

== Biography ==
Bildersee was born on September 4, 1883, in New York City, to parents Barnett and Flora Bildersee, the first of three children. In 1903, she graduated from Hunter College, subsequently receiving her M.A. and PhD from Columbia University in 1912 and 1932, respectively. From 1903 to 1911, she taught in the New York Public School System before being appointed an instructor of English at Hunter College. She worked there for twenty years, eventually becoming acting Dean in 1926. At the time, Hunter and City College shared buildings for their Brooklyn campuses but served men and women separately. Students were not allowed to go to the other college's floors or talk to students from the other college in the building. Bildersee had a policy of letting Hunter attendees meet with City students in her office, with her present, if there was a "good business reason."

Five years following, Bildersee became Dean of Women at Brooklyn College (of which she was one of the founders of), where she would reach head of admissions, and in 1938, Dean of students. She eventually retired in 1954, whereupon she was awarded an honorary doctorate of humane letters and the title of dean and professor emerita. She was principal of Temple Beth-El and Emanuel religious school, and wrote several textbooks.

Bildersee is the author of Jewish Post-Biblical History through Great Personalities (1918) and Imaginative Writing: An Illustrated Course for Students (1927). The 1927 textbook on writing had an expressivist style, which irked writing theorist James A. Berlin. However, theorist Kay Halasek believed that it was a good match for Bildersee's intended audience, because it carefully constructed its teachings in the right social context and provided the most help for communication style and developing agency over personal voice.

Bildersee died on November 19, 1971. In A City College in Action, about Brooklyn College, Thomas Evans Coulton said of Bildersee, “It was to the students, their social and emotional life, that Adele Bildersee gave her particular attention. Ever a faithful and devoted officer and teacher, she fostered their clubs, their newspaper, their dances, their interfaith movements, and the Country Fair … and took the first steps in establishing a program of personal counseling for them. She carried with her in full measure the very special gift of a deep concern for youth.”

== Selected works ==
- Jewish Post-Biblical History through Great Personalities (1918)
- The story of Genesis (1924)
- Imaginative Writing: An Illustrated Course for Students (1927)
- State scholarship students at Hunter college of the city of New York (1932)
