= Seymour Hess =

American meteorologist and planetary scientist

Seymour Lester Hess
- Born: October 27, 1920; Brooklyn, New York
- Died: January 15, 1982 (aged 61); Tallahassee, Florida
- Education: Brooklyn College; University of Chicago
- Known for: Head of meteorology for Viking program
- Awards: Robert O. Lawton Distinguished Professorship
- Scientific career
- Fields: Atmospheric sciences
- Workplaces: United States Army Air Forces; Lowell Observatory; Florida State University

Seymour Lester Hess (October 27, 1920 – January 15, 1982) was an American meteorologist and planetary scientist.

He was born in Brooklyn, New York. After earning a bachelor's degree in chemistry from Brooklyn College, in 1943 he entered the University of Chicago as an Army Air Cadet. He completed his master's degree in 1945, then, following his release from military service as a lieutenant in the United States Army Air Forces, he became a doctoral student in the meteorology department. In 1948 he explored an interest in planetary meteorology, and spent his time at the Lowell Observatory in Flagstaff, Arizona observing Mars. His dissertation was titled, Some Aspects of the Meteorology of Mars. On May 20, 1950, Hess had the unusual distinction of reporting a UFO sighting from Flagstaff, saying it was a bright disk cutting through clouds and "definitely was not an airplane".

In 1950, he joined the newly formed meteorology department at Florida State University, where he would spend the remainder of his career and later twice served as the department chairman. Starting in 1966, he was associate dean at the University for several years. He served as head of the meteorology science team for the Viking landers, and helped design the weather instruments for the Viking 1. On July 21, 1976, he made the first ever extraterrestrial weather report, giving the atmospheric conditions at Chryse Planitia, Mars. In 1978, he received the Robert O. Lawton Distinguished Professorship, the highest honor awarded by FSU. His work titled Introduction to theoretical meteorology was published in 1959; it was reprinted in 1979. He died from complications following surgery for cancer. In 1983, the Seymour Hess Memorial Symposium was held in his honor by the International Union of Geodesy and Geophysics.
