= Annette Danto =

Annette Danto is a filmmaker, author, and Undergraduate Film Department Chairperson at Brooklyn College of the City University of New York. She is a former Chairperson of the Feirstein Graduate School of Cinema (8/2021 - 1/2023).

Danto holds a BA from McGill University (1980), an MS from Columbia University (1982), and an M.F.A. from New York University (1989). Danto has directed both fiction and documentary films.

Three times a Fulbright Scholar in filmmaking, and formerly president of the alumni association Friends of Fulbright to India, Danto is also a co-founder of nonprofit media organization AV Communications Trust, based in South India.

Having joined Brooklyn College in 1997, Danto is the founding director of two international, documentary-production programs there, one with India and one with Wales.
