= Brooklyn College =

College of the City University of New York

- Motto: Latin: Nil sine magno labore
- Motto in English: Nothing without great effort
- Type: Public university
- Established: 1930; 96 years ago
- Parent institution: City University of New York
- Endowment: $98.0 million (2019)
- Budget: $123.96 million (2021)
- President: Michelle Anderson
- Provost: April Bedford
- Faculty: 1,259 (fall 2023)
- Students: 13,935 (fall 2023)
- Undergraduates: 11,330 (fall 2023)
- Postgraduates: 2,605 (fall 2023)
- Location: Brooklyn, New York City, US; 40°37′52″N 73°57′9″W
- Campus: Urban, 35 acres (14 ha)
- Colors: Maroon, gold, & grey
- Nickname: Bulldogs
- Sporting affiliations: NCAA Division III – CUNYAC (South)
- Mascot: Buster the Bulldog
- Website: www.brooklyn.edu

Brooklyn College (BC) is a public university in Brooklyn, New York City, United States. It is part of the City University of New York (CUNY) system and enrolled nearly 14,000 students on a 35-acre (14 ha) campus in the Midwood and Flatbush sections of Brooklyn as of fall 2023.

New York City's first public coeducational liberal arts college, the college was formed in 1930 by the merger of the Brooklyn branches of Hunter College (centered in Manhattan), then a women's college, and of the City College of New York (also Manhattan), then a men's college. Once tuition-free, the city's 1975 fiscal crisis ended the free tuition policy. The college also consolidated to its main campus.

Prominent alumni of Brooklyn College include US senators, federal judges, US financial chairmen, Olympians, CEOs, and recipients of Academy Awards, Emmy Awards, Pulitzer Prizes, and Nobel Prizes.

== College history ==
=== Early decades ===
Brooklyn College was founded in 1930. That year, as directed by the New York City Board of Higher Education on April 22, the college authorized the combination of the Downtown Brooklyn branches of Hunter College, at that time a city women's college, and the City College of New York, then a men's college (both these branches had been established in 1926). The third oldest higher education institution in what would become the City University system, Brooklyn College became the first public coeducational liberal arts college in New York City. The school opened in September 1930, holding separate classes for men and women until their junior years. Admission would require passing a stringent entrance exam.

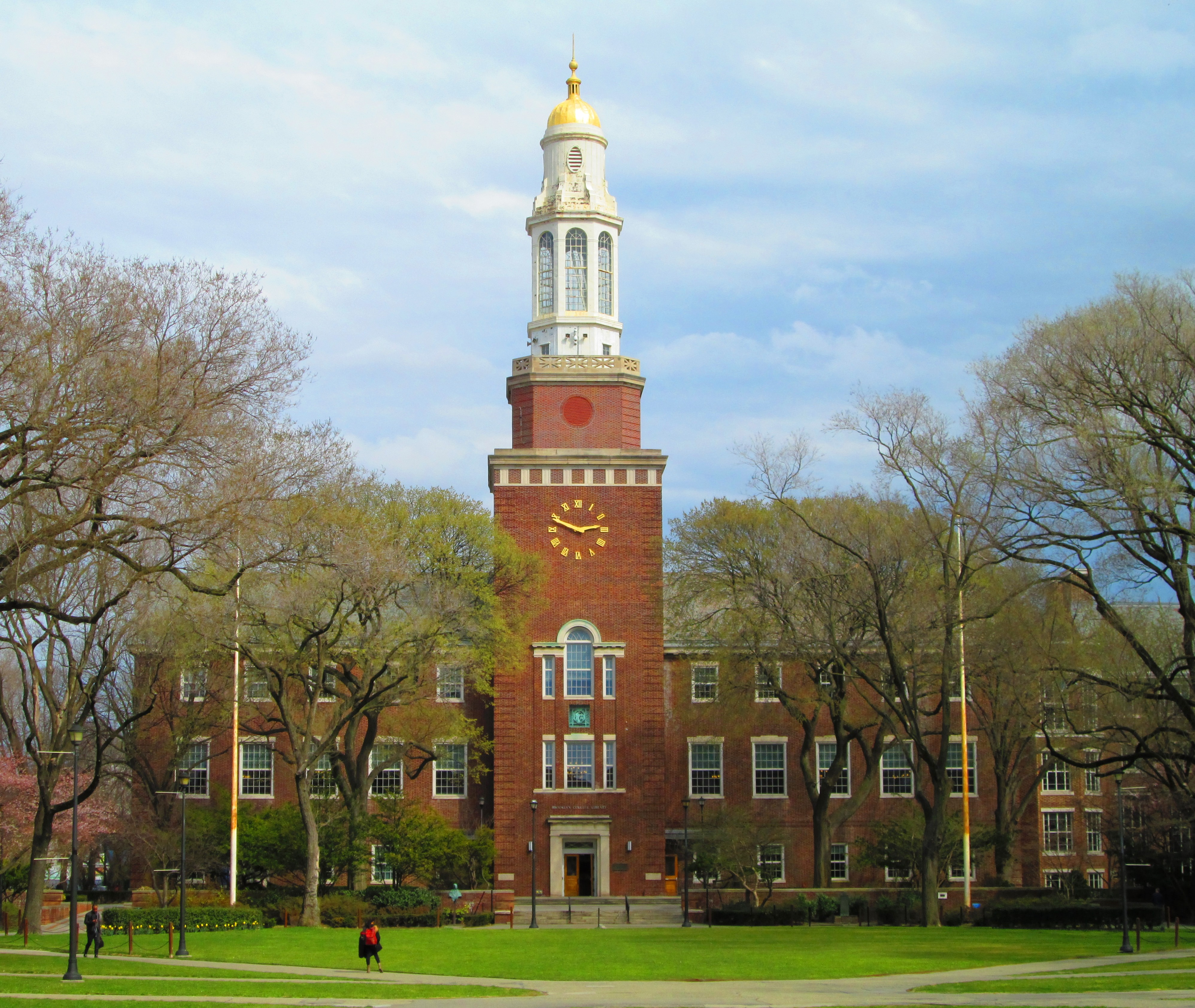
Brooklyn College Library, situated on the East Quad, was designed by campus architect Randolph Evans.

In 1932, architect Randolph Evans drafted a plan for the campus on a substantial plot that his employer owned in Brooklyn's Midwood section. Evans sketched a Georgian campus facing a central quadrangle, and anchored by a library building with a tower. Evans presented the sketches to the college's then president, Dr. William A. Boylan, who approved the layout.

The land was bought for $1.6 million (equivalent to $37.8 million in 2025), and construction allotment was $5 million (equivalent to $118 million in 2025). Construction began in 1935. At the groundbreaking ceremony was Mayor Fiorello La Guardia and Brooklyn Borough President Raymond Ingersoll. In 1936, United States President Franklin D. Roosevelt visited and laid the gymnasium's cornerstone. The new campus opened for the fall 1937 semester. In the 1940s, Boylan, Ingersoll, Roosevelt and La Guardia each became namesake of a campus building.

During the tenure of its second president, Harry Gideonse, from 1939 to 1966, Brooklyn College ranked high nationally in number of alumni with doctorate degrees. As academics fled Nazi Germany, nearly a third of refugee historians who were female would at some point work at Brooklyn College. In 1944, sociologist Marion Vera Cuthbert became the first permanent black faculty member appointed at any of the New York municipal colleges. And in 1956, with John Hope Franklin joining, Brooklyn College became the first "white" college to hire on a permanent basis a historian who was black.

In 1959, still tuition-free, about 8,000 undergraduates were enrolled. In 1962, the college joined six other colleges to form the City University of New York, creating the world's second-largest university. In 1983, Brooklyn College named its library the Harry D. Gideonse Library.

Nevertheless, Gideonse remains a controversial figure in the college's history; as one account noted, he is "either lauded as a hero and great educator in hagiographic accounts . . . or decried by faculty and alumni as an autocrat who stifled academic freedom and students' rights."

In addition to his curricular and student life reforms, Gideonse was known for his decades-long campaign to ferret out Communists among the college community and his testimony before congressional and state investigating committees during the Second Red Scare.

On the other hand, perhaps retaining the memory of the time when, as a University of Chicago professor, he was unjustly accused of being a Communist and advocating "free love," Gideonse also attacked those who, without evidence, charged faculty, staff and students with being subversives and defended faculty free speech rights against outside critics.

The college's third president, Francis Kilcoyne, served from 1966 to 1967. The fourth president, Harold Syrett, resigned due to ill health in February 1969, when George A. Peck was named acting president. John Kneller, Brooklyn College's fifth president, served from 1969 until 1979. These presidents served during what were perhaps the most tumultuous years for Brooklyn College.

=== 1960s ===
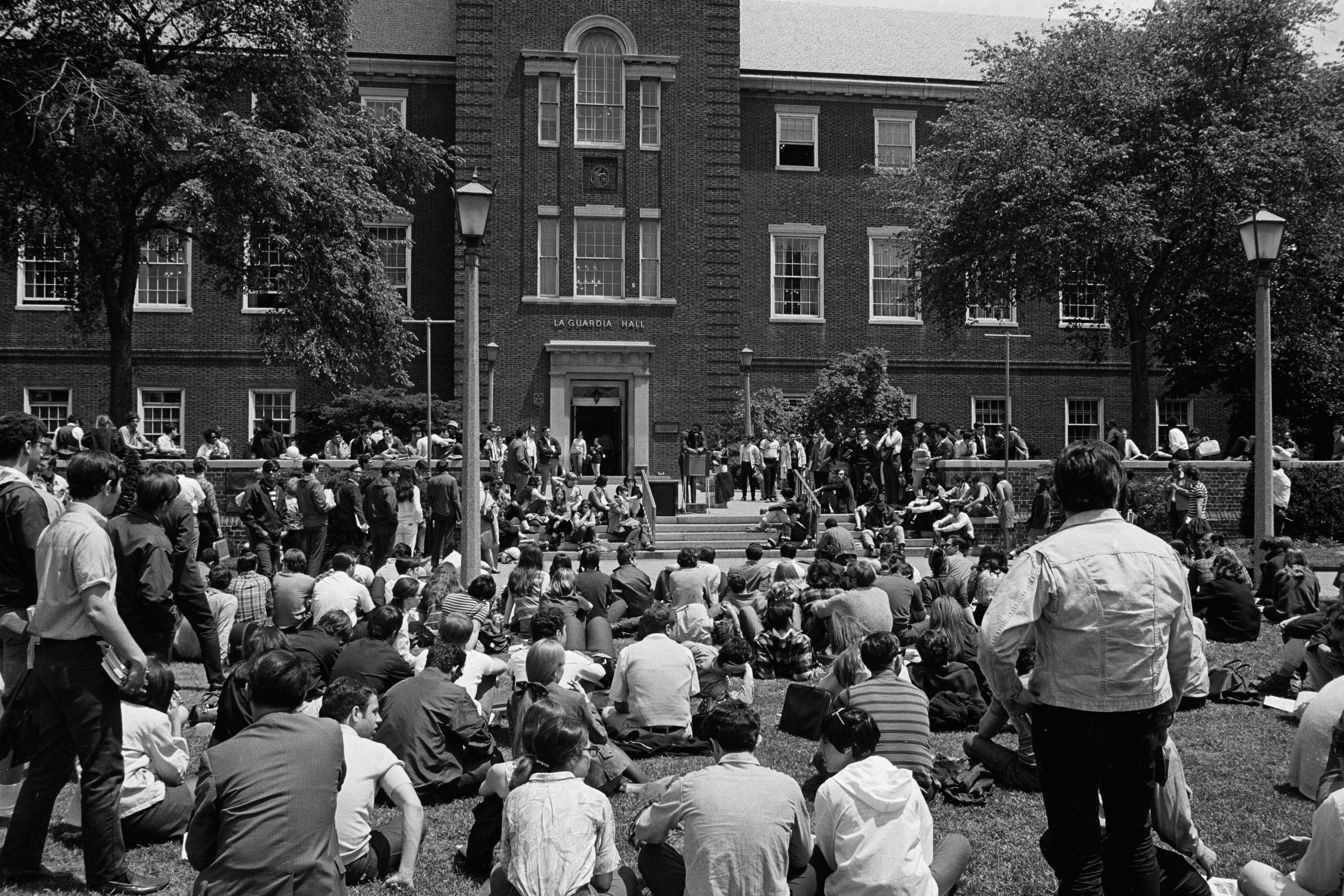
Jarvis Tyner, national chairman of the W. E. B. Du Bois Clubs of America, addresses a rally to protest the arrest of students occupying the dean's office at Brooklyn College, May 22, 1968

During the Vietnam War, as they did on other U.S. campuses, student protests rocked Brooklyn College. President Gideonse, in a 1965 television interview, blamed demonstrations on Communists who were "duping the innocents" into demanding more freedom on campus, leading the New York Civil Liberties Union to criticize Gideonse for "his efforts to smear student groups at the college with the Communist label."

Also in 1965, student protests forced the Gideonse administration to rescind new, stricter dress rules that forbade male students from wearing dungarees or sweatshirts on campus at any time and mandated that female students wear skirts and blouses even in extremely cold weather. After Gideonse's retirement in June 1966, a newly appointed dean of administration, Dante Negro, said he was not bothered by the students' more casual dress "that makes it hard to distinguish between the sexes," calling it "a passing fad."

On October 21, 1967, a front-page story in The New York Times reported that the college was virtually closed down by a strike of thousands of students angered by police action against antiwar demonstrators protesting U.S. Navy recruiters earlier in the week. Five days later, another front-page Times story reported that students had agreed to return to classes after an agreement was reached with college administrators after negotiations. A few days after that, President Kilcoyne walked out when New York Mayor John V. Lindsay appeared at the college, citing Lindsay's insult in calling the school "Berkeley East."

Around the same time, the college's students were involved in campus protests involving racial issues. In May 1968, Brooklyn College news again made the front page of The New York Times when police broke up a 16-hour sit-in at the registrar's office to demand that more Black and Puerto Rican students be admitted to the school. At trial, a Black Brooklyn judge reacted angrily when one student said they had been reacting to racism and sentenced him and 32 other white students to five days in jail for the sit-in. In May 1969, 19 or 20 Brooklyn College students faced criminal charges in connection with campus disorders during the spring semester, including raids in which students allegedly ransacked files and smoke-bombed the library.

In the years following 1968, the efforts of both Puerto Rican and African American students led to the establishment of US-based Puerto Rican Studies program and Institutes at Brooklyn College. These efforts were directly connected to the open admissions fight.

=== 1970s ===
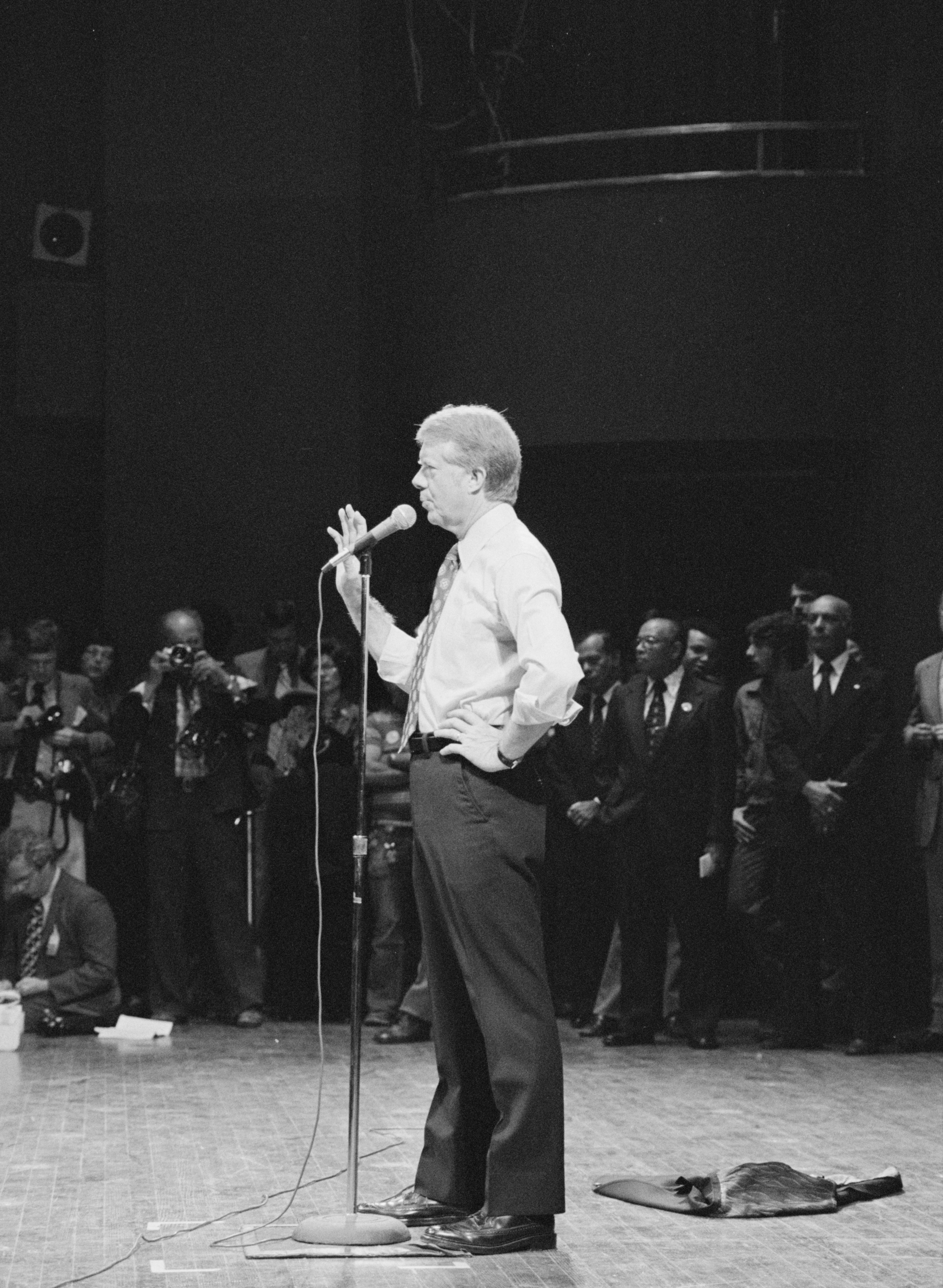
Jimmy Carter speaking at Brooklyn College during his 1976 presidential campaign

In late April 1970, students demanding more open admissions and racial diversity staged a sit-in at President Kneller's office, holding him and five deans there for several hours. The next week, in early May 1970, students seized the president's office and other buildings during a student strike upon the Kent State shootings and the Cambodian Campaign. President Kneller terminated classes, but kept campus buildings open for students and faculty, obtaining a court order against students occupying buildings.

In October 1974, 200 Hispanic students took over the registrar's office to protest President Kneller's appointment of a chair of the Puerto Rican Studies Department different from that of the person selected by a faculty search committee. Frank Bonilla, head of the Center for Puerto Rican Studies at Hunter College, at the time, expressed the center's support for faculty and students at Brooklyn College, to demand the right to self-determination for the BC Department of Puerto Rican Studies. Defying a judge's temporary court order to leave the building, the protesters were supported at a rallies outside Boylan Hall by many student groups and the alumni association, but Kneller refused to rescind his controversial appointment. Protests flared up again in the spring 1975 semester with another takeover of the registrar's office. By January 1976, the college's faculty union voted "no confidence" in Kneller, charging that he "consistently ignored faculty rights" and failed to provide leadership.

Brooklyn College, along with the rest of CUNY, shut down for two weeks in May and June 1976 as the university was unable to pay its bills. Amid New York City's financial crisis, near bankruptcy, Brooklyn College's campus in downtown Brooklyn closed, leaving the Midwood campus as the Brooklyn College's only campus. In the fall of 1976, with some 30,000 undergraduates enrolled, the college charged tuition for the first time.

In January 1978, the college's Faculty Council approved a vote of "no confidence" in President Kneller on Wednesday and recommended to the Board of Higher Education that he be replaced.

Brooklyn College's sixth president was Robert Hess, who served from 1979 to 1992. Hess initiated major changes in the college curriculum, mandating a standard core for all students. Implementation of the new curriculum was aided by a large grant from the National Endowment for the Humanities. By 1984, in a national report's otherwise gloomy assessment of humanities education, Brooklyn College was singled out as "a bright spot" among American universities for stressing the study of the humanities.

=== 1980s ===
In a 1988 survey of thousands of American college deans, Brooklyn College ranked 5th in providing students with a strong general education, and was the only public institution among the top five. As of 1989, Brooklyn College ranked 11th in the US, and ahead of six of the eight Ivy League universities, by number of graduates who had acquired doctoral degrees. At Brooklyn College being called "the poor man’s Harvard," President Hess quipped, "I like to think of Harvard as the rich man’s Brooklyn College."

Even as Brooklyn College rebounded academically, it suffered a severe budget crunch in the 1988–1989 school year due to reductions in state financing; this resulted in fewer courses, larger classes, no new faculty and staff hirings, supply shortages, and deferral of maintenance of buildings and grounds.

=== 1990s ===
Vernon Lattin was the seventh president of Brooklyn College, from 1992 to 2000. During Lattin's tenure, Brooklyn College began a complete overhaul of campus buildings and vastly improved computer and Internet access for students and faculty. The college returned to intercollegiate sports competition and the college chess team won U.S. and international championships. Lattin was also president at the time of the first individual million-dollar donation to the Brooklyn College Foundation.

=== Modern history ===
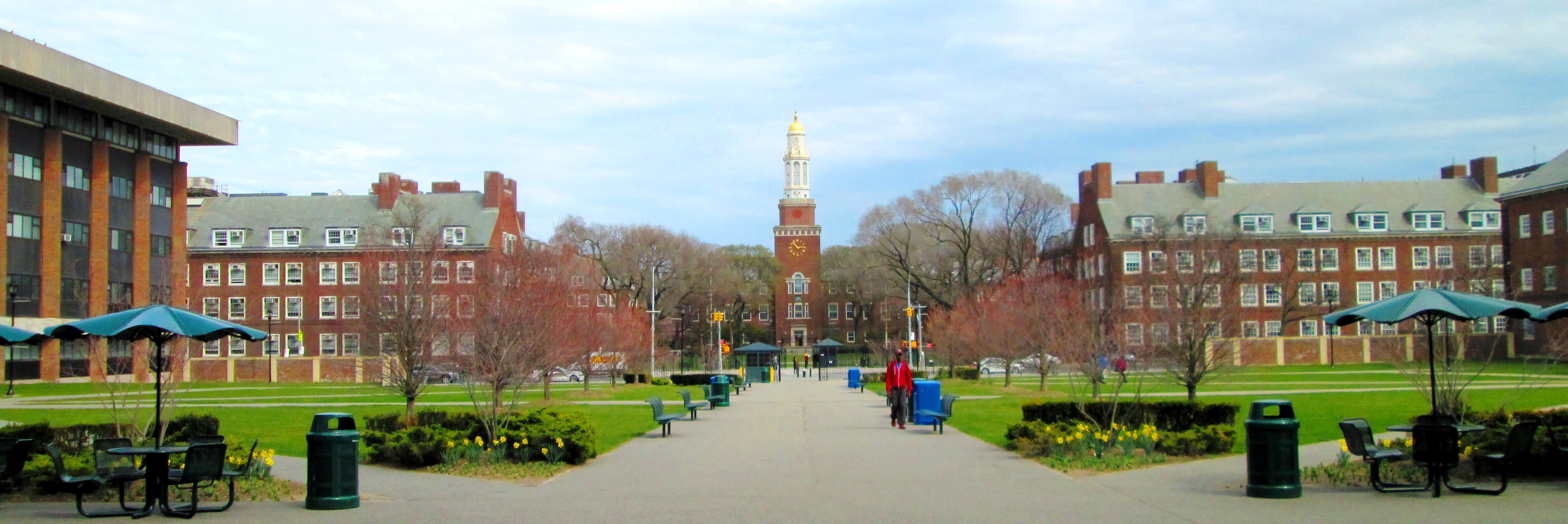
View from the West Quad looking onto the East Quad (from left to right, James Hall, Boylan Hall, the library, Ingersoll Hall, and Roosevelt Hall)

Brooklyn College's leafy East Quad looks much like it did when it was originally constructed.

Whitman Hall, the former performing arts facility which included as its largest venue the George Gershwin Theatre, was demolished and replaced by The Leonard & Claire Tow Center for the Performing Arts, for which ground was broken in 2011. The performing arts center was named for alumni Leonard and Claire Tow, who gave $10 million to the college. Other changes to the original design include the demolition of Plaza Building, due to its inefficient use of space, poor ventilation, and significant maintenance costs. To replace the Plaza Building, the college constructed West Quad Center, designed by the notable Uruguayan architect Rafael Viñoly. The new building contains classroom space, offices, gymnasiums and a swimming pool. It houses the offices of Registration, Admissions, Financial Aid, and the Department of Physical Education and Exercise Science. The grounds contain a quadrangle with grassy areas and trees. New façades are being constructed on Roosevelt and James halls where they once connected with Plaza Building. The 2009–10 CUNYAC championship men's basketball team now plays its home games in the West Quad Center.

This followed a major $70 million library renovation completed in 2003 that saw the library moved to a temporary home while construction took place. The Brooklyn College library is now located in its original location in a completely renovated and expanded LaGuardia Hall.

From 2000 to 2009 when he retired, Christoph M. Kimmich was the eighth president of Brooklyn College. In the 2003 edition of The Best 345 Colleges, the Princeton Review named Brooklyn College as the most beautiful campus in the country and ranked it fifth in the nation for "Best Academic Bang for the Buck".

Karen L. Gould was named the ninth president of Brooklyn College in 2009. Among her accomplishments were creating a new graduate film school and four new academic schools, new athletic fields, and increasing enrollment in the sciences. Her tenure was marked by repeated free speech controversies involving Israel that drew both criticism and praise. After 42 years in higher education, Gould announced her retirement in 2015.

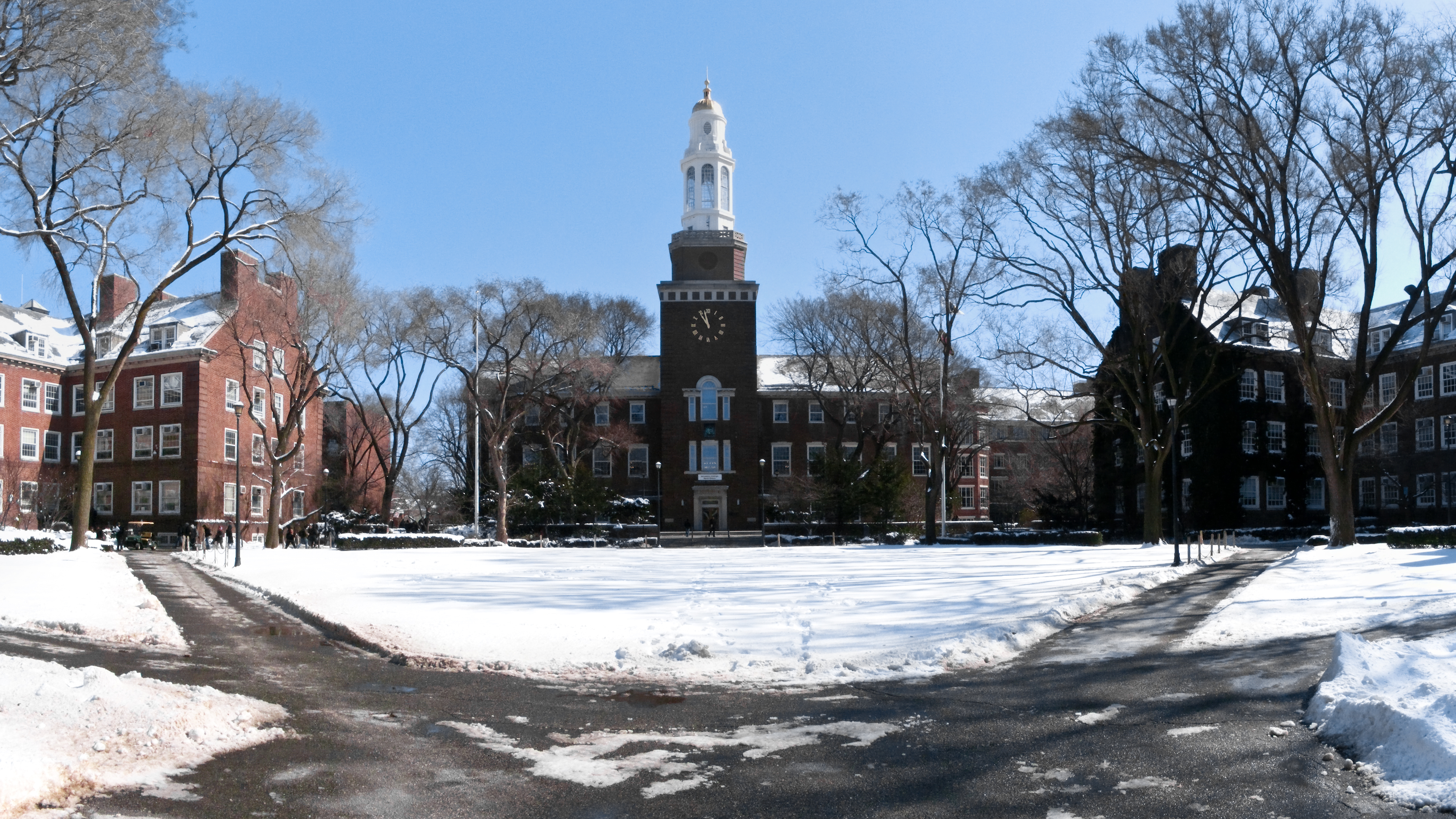
East Quad in March 2009

Michelle Anderson became the 10th president of Brooklyn College in 2016. In 2016, Brooklyn College announced a new home for the Koppelman School of Business, with the planned construction of a new building, Koppelman Hall, on property adjacent to the 26-acre campus bought in 2011. This increased the campus size to 35 acres.

For four straight years, starting in 2018, U.S. News & World Report named Brooklyn College the most ethnically diverse college in the North Region.

=== 2020s ===
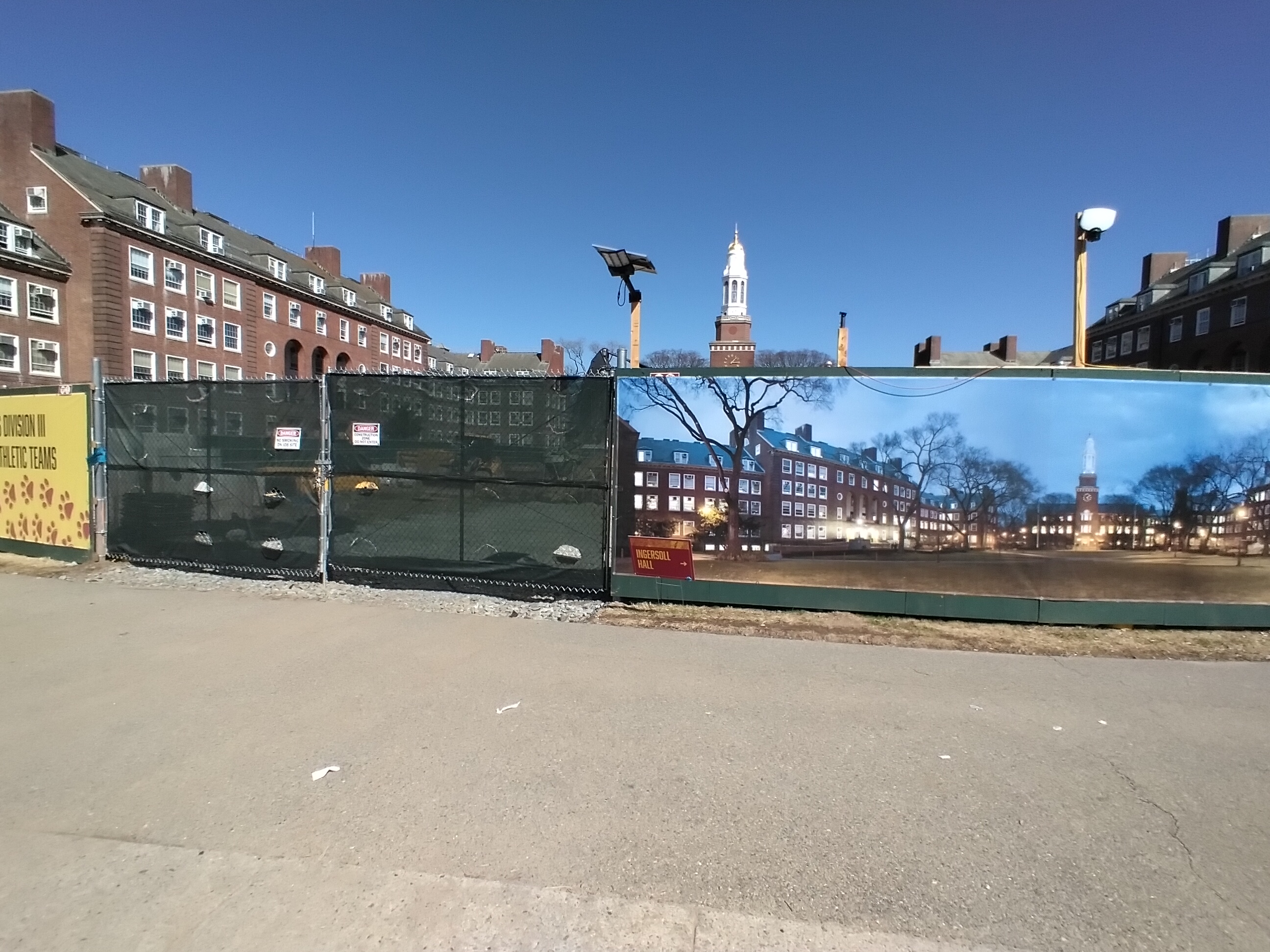
The East Quad under renovation

The East Quad renovated

Shortly after October 7th, Republican New York City Council member Inna Vernikov of the 48th City Council District was arrested for bringing a gun to a counterprotest at a pro-Palestine rally.

On May 7, 2025, there was a Pro-Palestine protest on the East Quad Campus. It ended with police force with a crackdown on the demonstration.

Starting on December 22, 2025, the East Quad had recently undergone a renovation. However, students complained and criticized the action as inconvenient as it hinders their ability to go to their classes on time.

The first phase of the renovations was completed in the Summer of 2026.

The newly opened renovated East Quad

The second phase of the renovations has been completed on October 22, 2026.

== Organization ==
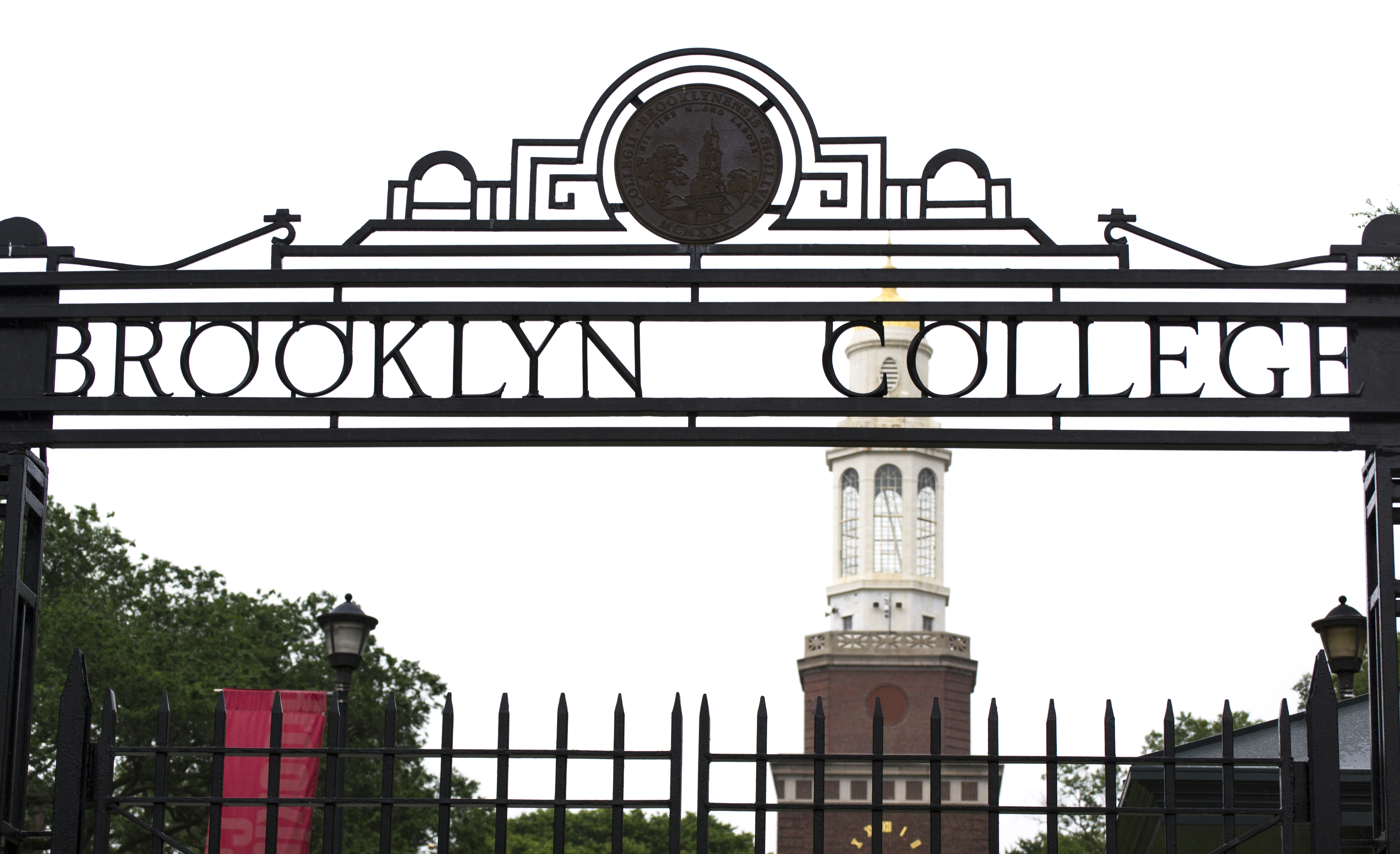
Entry gate

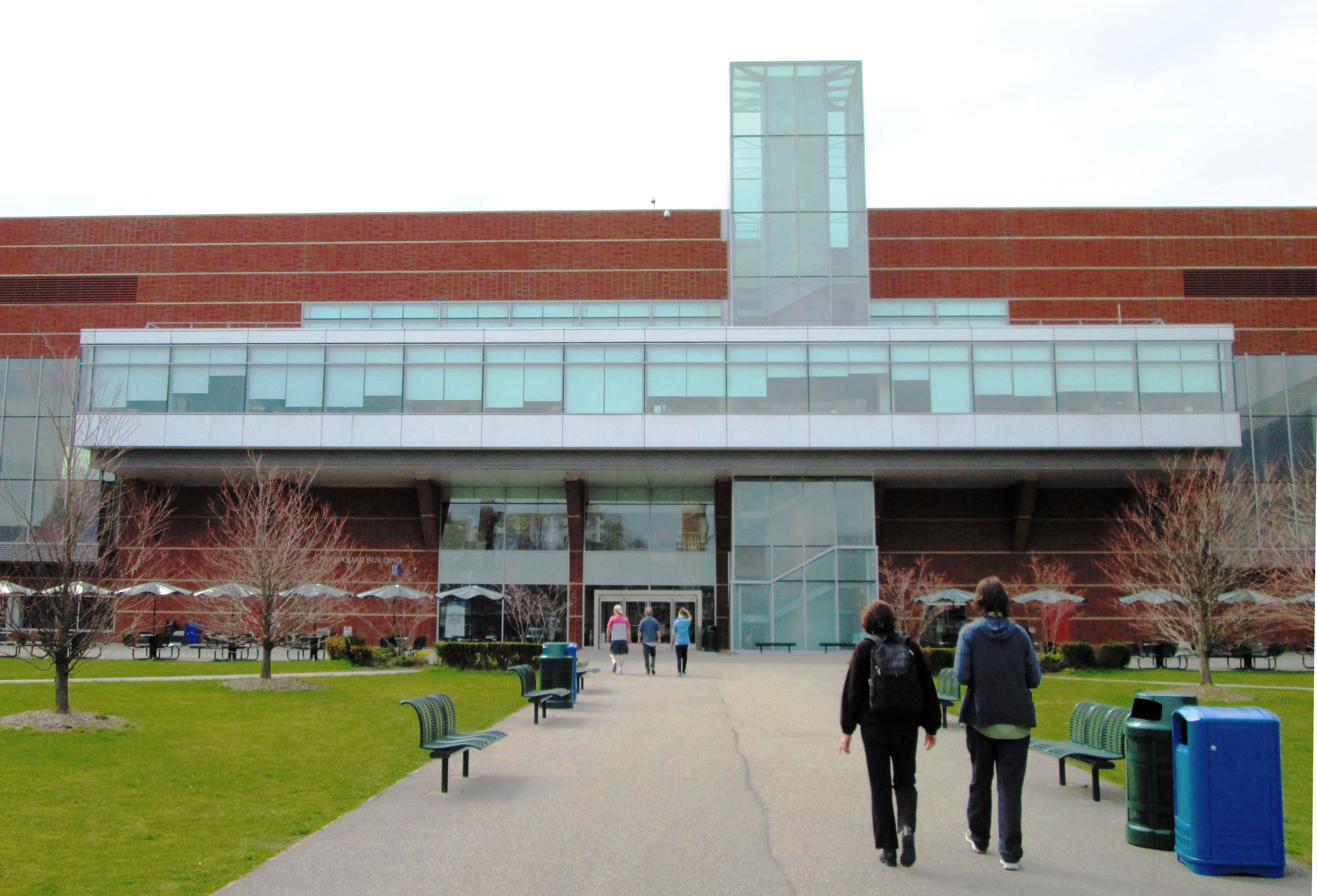
West Quad Center

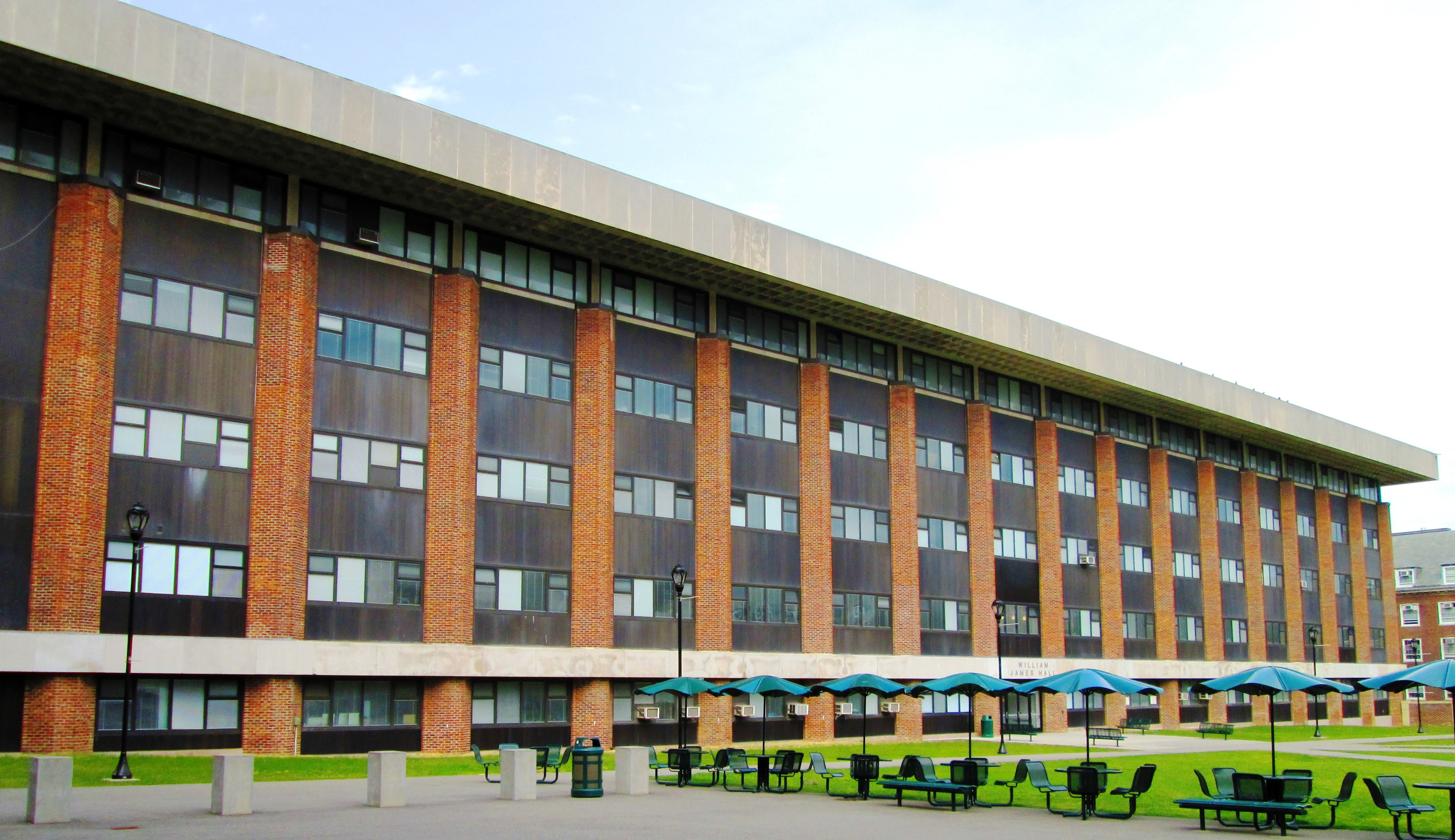
James Hall

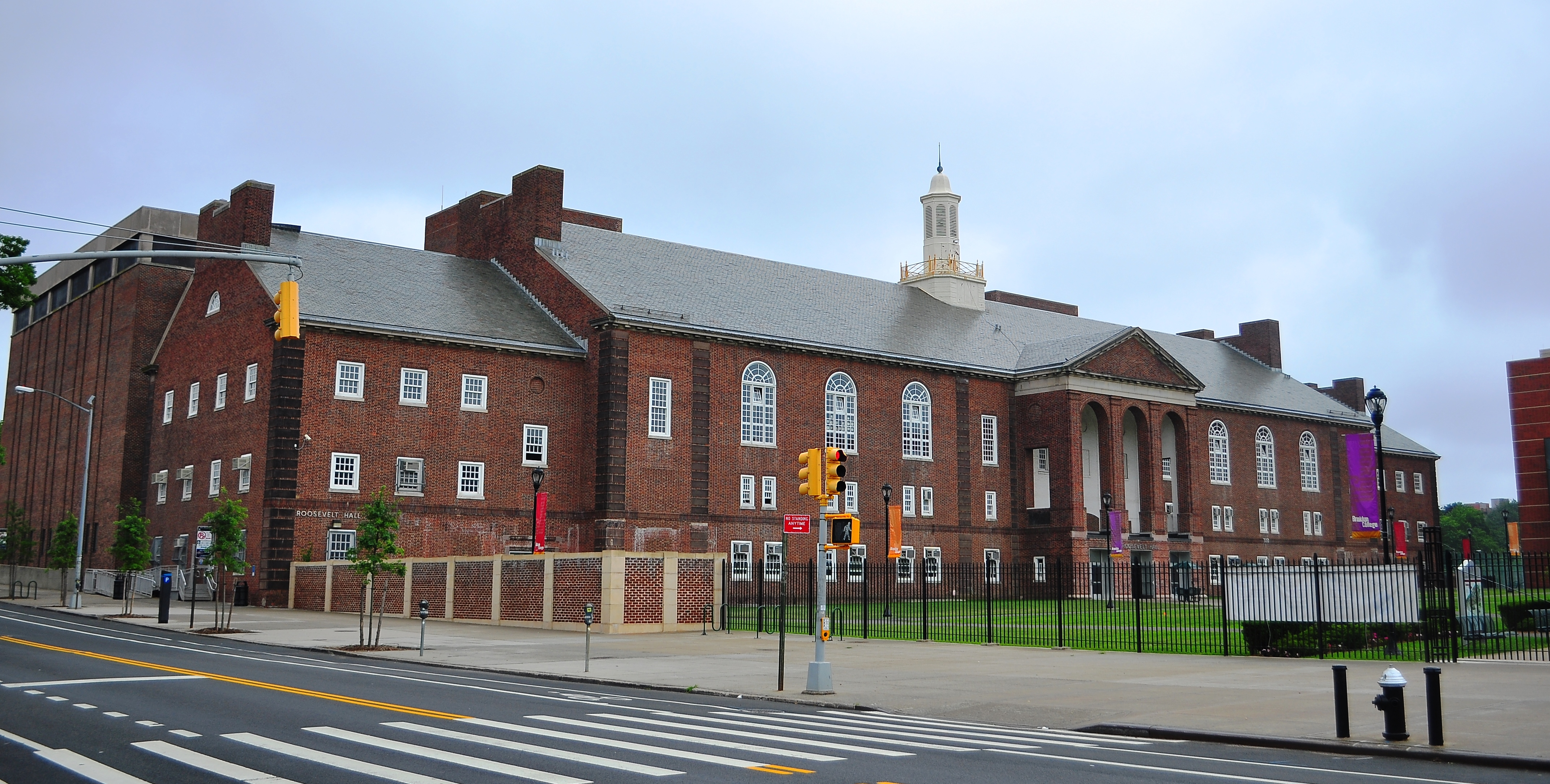
Roosevelt Hall

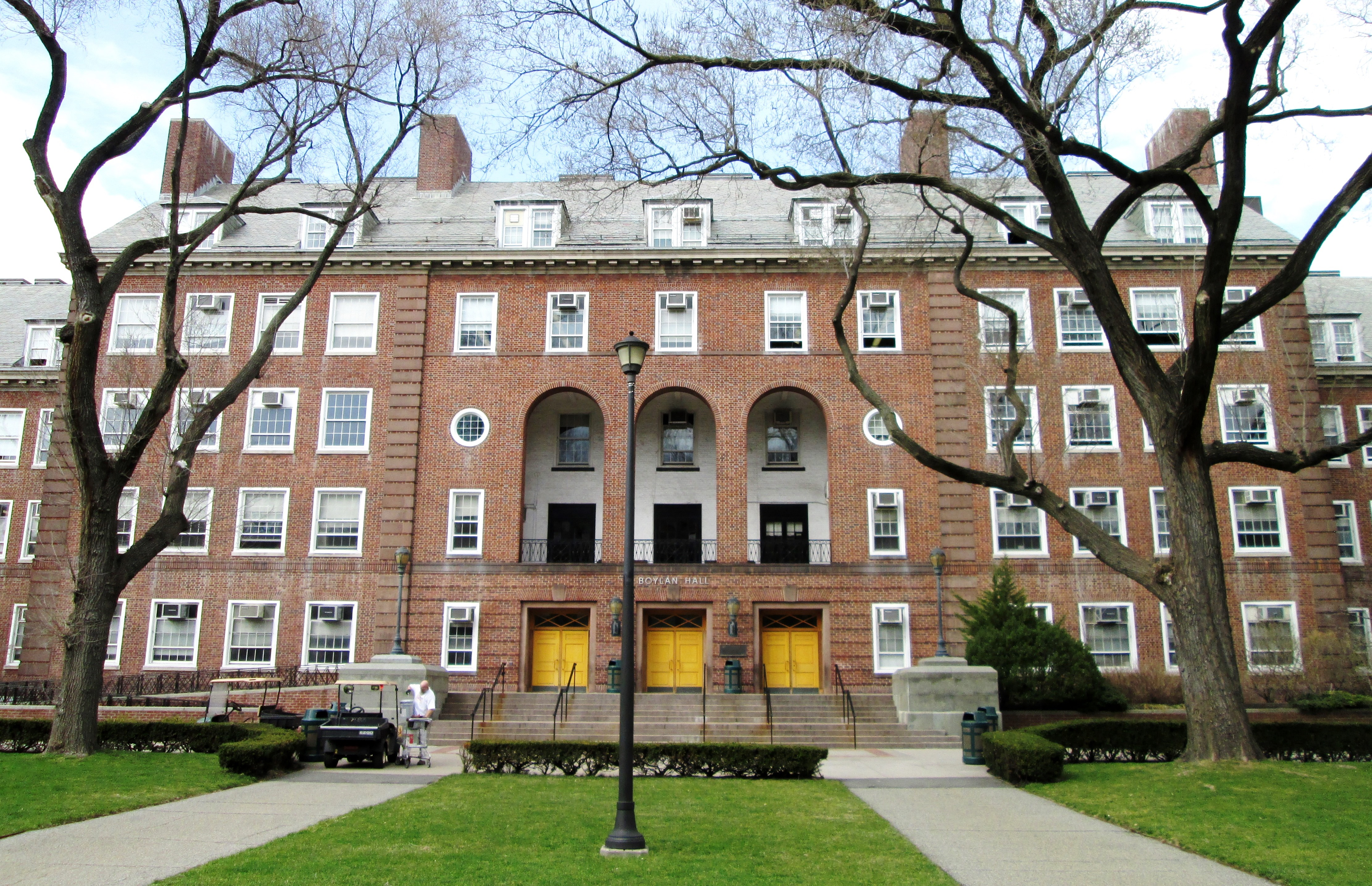
Boylan Hall

Ingersoll Hall

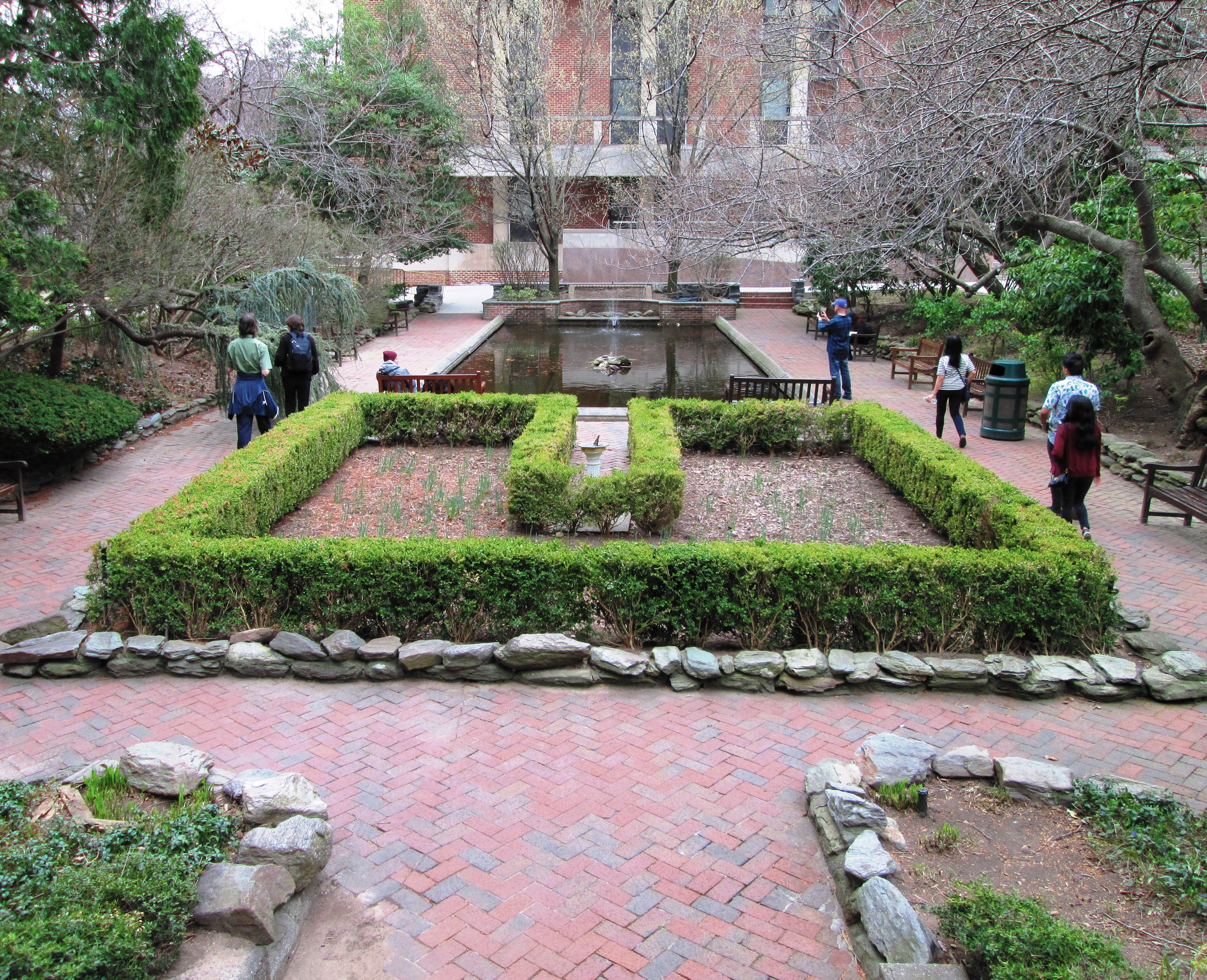
Lily Pond

Brooklyn College has five schools:

- Murray Koppelman School of Business
- School of Education
- School of Humanities and Social Sciences
- School of Natural and Behavioral Sciences
- School of Visual, Media, and Performing Arts

== Public transit access ==
Brooklyn College is accessible from the Flatbush Avenue-Brooklyn College station, which is served by the 2 and 5 trains. The college is about a half-mile (a ten-minute walk) from the Avenue H station of the Q line. It can also be reached by the B6, B11, B41, B44, B49, B103, or Q35 bus.

== Academics ==
Undergraduate demographics as of Fall 2023
Race and ethnicity	Total
Asian	25%
White	24%
Hispanic	24%
Black	21%
International student	3%
Two or more races	3%
Economic diversity
Low-income (Note: The percentage of students who received an income-based federal Pell grant intended for low-income students.)	59%
Affluent (Note: The percentage of students who are a part of the American middle class at the bare minimum.)	41%

=== Undergraduate admissions ===
In 2025, Brooklyn College accepted 53.7% of undergraduate applicants with those enrolled having an average 3.42 high school GPA. The university does not require submission of standardized test scores, but they will be considered as part of an application if submitted. Those enrolled who submitted test scores had an average 1280 SAT score (84% submitting scores) while no ACT scores were reported.

=== Undergraduate curriculum ===
Beginning in 1981, the college instituted a group of classes that all undergraduates were required to take, called "Core Studies". The classes were: Classical Origins of Western Culture, Introduction to Art, Introduction to Music, People, Power, and Politics, The Shaping of the Modern World, Introduction to Mathematical Reasoning and Computer Programming, Landmarks of Literature, Chemistry, Physics, Biology, Geology, Studies in African, Asian, and Latin American Cultures, and Knowledge, Existence and Values.

In 2006, the Core Curriculum was revamped, and the 13 required courses were replaced with 15 courses in 3 disciplines, from which students were required to take 11. In the fall of 2013, Brooklyn College embarked on CUNY's new general education alternative, the Pathways curriculum, consisting of three components: Required Core (four courses), Flexible Core (six courses) and College Option (four courses)—totaling 42 credits. Brooklyn College offers over a hundred majors varying from the visual arts to Women's Studies.

=== Division of Graduate Studies ===
The Division of Graduate Studies at Brooklyn College was established in 1935 and offers more than seventy programs in the arts, education, humanities, sciences, and computer and social sciences. Among those programs is the Graduate theatre program, which is the top ranked in the CUNY system and 14th in the United States; faculty include Tony Award nominee Justin Townsend.

=== B.A.–M.D. program ===
The Brooklyn College B.A.–M.D. program is an eight-year program affiliated with SUNY Downstate Medical Center. The program follows a rigorous selection process, with a maximum of 15 students selected every year. Each student selected to the program receives a Brooklyn College Presidential Scholarship. B.A.–M.D. students must engage in community service for three years, beginning in their lower sophomore semester. During one summer of their undergraduate studies, students are required to volunteer in a clinical setting where they are involved in direct patient care. B.A.–M.D. students are encouraged to major in the humanities or social sciences.

=== The Scholars Program ===
The Scholars Program is home to a small number of students with strong writing ability and academic record. Being the oldest honors program in the CUNY system, The Scholars Program has served as a model for many other honors programs nationwide. It was established in 1960 and is an interdisciplinary liberal arts program. The program offers honors-level Core courses and seminars as well as small, personalized classes. Upon graduation from Brooklyn College, many Scholars continue their education in competitive programs at top-ranked universities like Princeton, Yale, and New York University. The program accepts incoming freshmen in addition to matriculated sophomores and transfer students (up to 48 credits). Once admitted, they receive a Brooklyn College Foundation Presidential Scholarship of up to $4,000 for every year of their undergraduate study at Brooklyn College and a laptop computer.

=== Coordinated Engineering Program ===
The Coordinated Honors Engineering Program offers a course of study equivalent to the first two years at any engineering school. Students who maintain the required academic level are guaranteed transfer to one of the three coordinating schools—New York University Tandon School of Engineering, City College of New York School of Engineering, and the College of Staten Island Engineering Science Program—to complete their bachelor's degree in engineering. Coordinating Engineering students have also transferred to the New York Institute of Technology, Stony Brook University, University of Wisconsin, University of Michigan, Cooper Union, and the Massachusetts Institute of Technology. Students admitted as incoming First-Year receive a Brooklyn College Foundation Presidential Scholarship that provides full tuition for their two years of full-time undergraduate study in the Coordinated Engineering Program. As members of the Honors Academy, Engineering Honors students take advantage of individual advising, faculty consultation, and early registration. In the Commons they find study facilities, computer access, academic, scholarship, internship, and career opportunities, and, above all, intellectual stimulation among other talented students like themselves. Students applying to the Engineering Honors Program will also be considered for the Scholars Program.

=== Feirstein Graduate School of Cinema ===
Barry R. Feirstein Graduate School of Cinema is the first public graduate film school in New York City. It is the only film school in America to have its own classroom on a film lot with the collaboration of Steiner Studios, the largest soundstage on the East Coast. The program offers a two-year M.A. in Cinema Studies, a two-year M.F.A. in Cinema Arts in the discipline of Producing, and a three-year M.F.A in Cinema Arts with five disciplines of cinematography, directing, post-production, screenwriting, and Digital Arts and Visual Effects. The school opened in the fall of 2015. The first graduating class was in Spring 2018.

=== Rankings ===
Academic rankings

Master's
- Washington Monthly: 84

Regional
- U.S. News & World Report: 38

National
- Forbes: 362
- WSJ/College Pulse: 358

U.S. News & World Report ranked the school tied for 62nd overall as a Regional college (North region), 6th as a Regional college in "Top Performers on Social Mobility", 15th as a Regional college in "Top Public Schools", and tied as a Regional college for 33rd in "Best Colleges for Veterans" for 2021.

== Athletics ==
Brooklyn College athletic teams are nicknamed the Bulldogs. The college is a member at the Division III level of the National Collegiate Athletic Association (NCAA); primarily competing in the City University of New York Athletic Conference (CUNYAC) since the 1996–97 academic year (which they also competed in a previous stint from 1978–79 to 1979–80). The Bulldogs previously competed in the East Coast Conference at the Division I level during the 1991–92 academic year.

Men's sports include basketball, cheerleading, cross country, soccer, swimming & diving, tennis and volleyball; while women's sports include basketball, cheerleading, cross country, soccer, softball, swimming & diving, tennis and volleyball. Their basketball program would find infamy for being the first reported incident of a potential bribe to fix a game against the Municipal University of Akron (now just the University of Akron) on January 29, 1945, leading to five arrests against Brooklyn College's players in question. Another former basketball player of theirs, a previous captain named David Budin, would later be involved as a part of the 1961 NCAA University Division men's basketball gambling scandal as a late addition for Jack Molinas' rigging group in question. From 1971 to 1977, future Olympic coach Michel Sebastiani was the head fencing coach of the men's fencing team. The football field was used for the outdoor scenes in the 1978 adult film Debbie Does Dallas.

=== Mascot ===
In 2010, Brooklyn College adopted the Bulldog as its new mascot. The athletic program was originally known as the Kingsmen. In 1994, the mascot was changed to the Bridges. However, after the school built new facilities and underwent other changes the athletic director pushed for a new name to reflect the new program.

== Notable people ==
=== Notable alumni ===
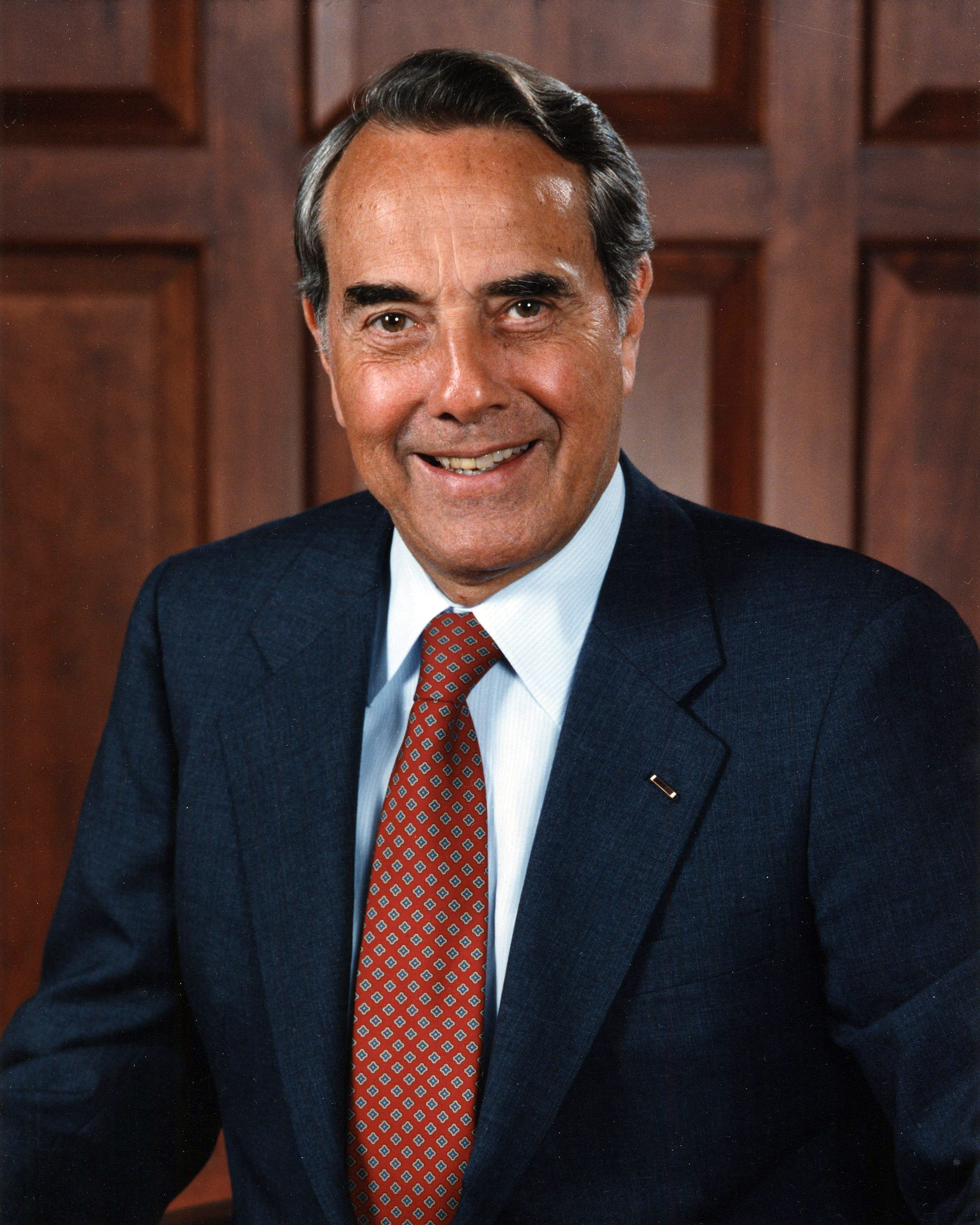
Senate Majority Leader and 1996 Republican presidential nominee: Bob Dole (stationed at Brooklyn College while in the Army as part of the Army Specialized Training Program 1943–1944)

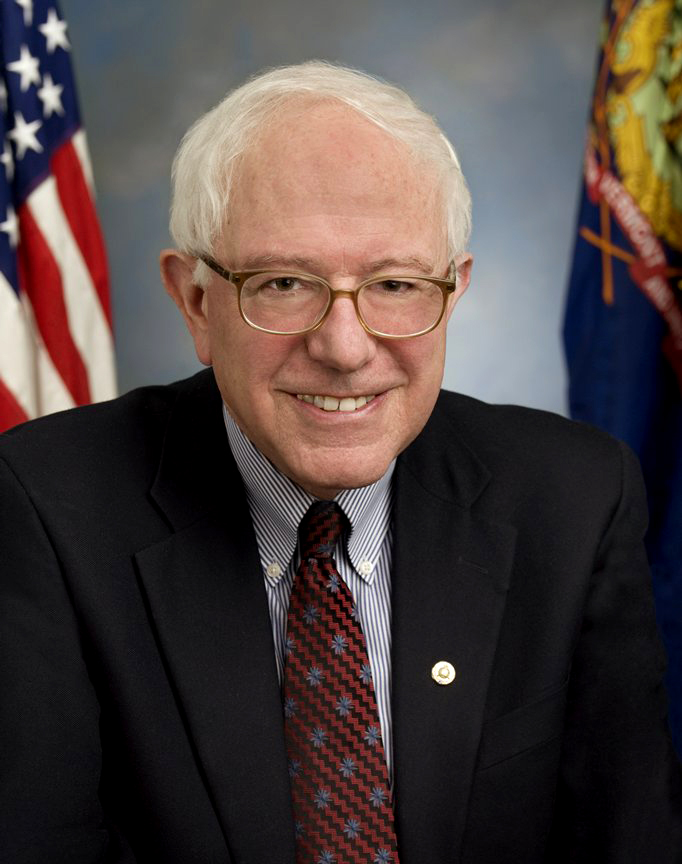
Vermont senator Bernie Sanders (1959–1960; transferred to the University of Chicago)

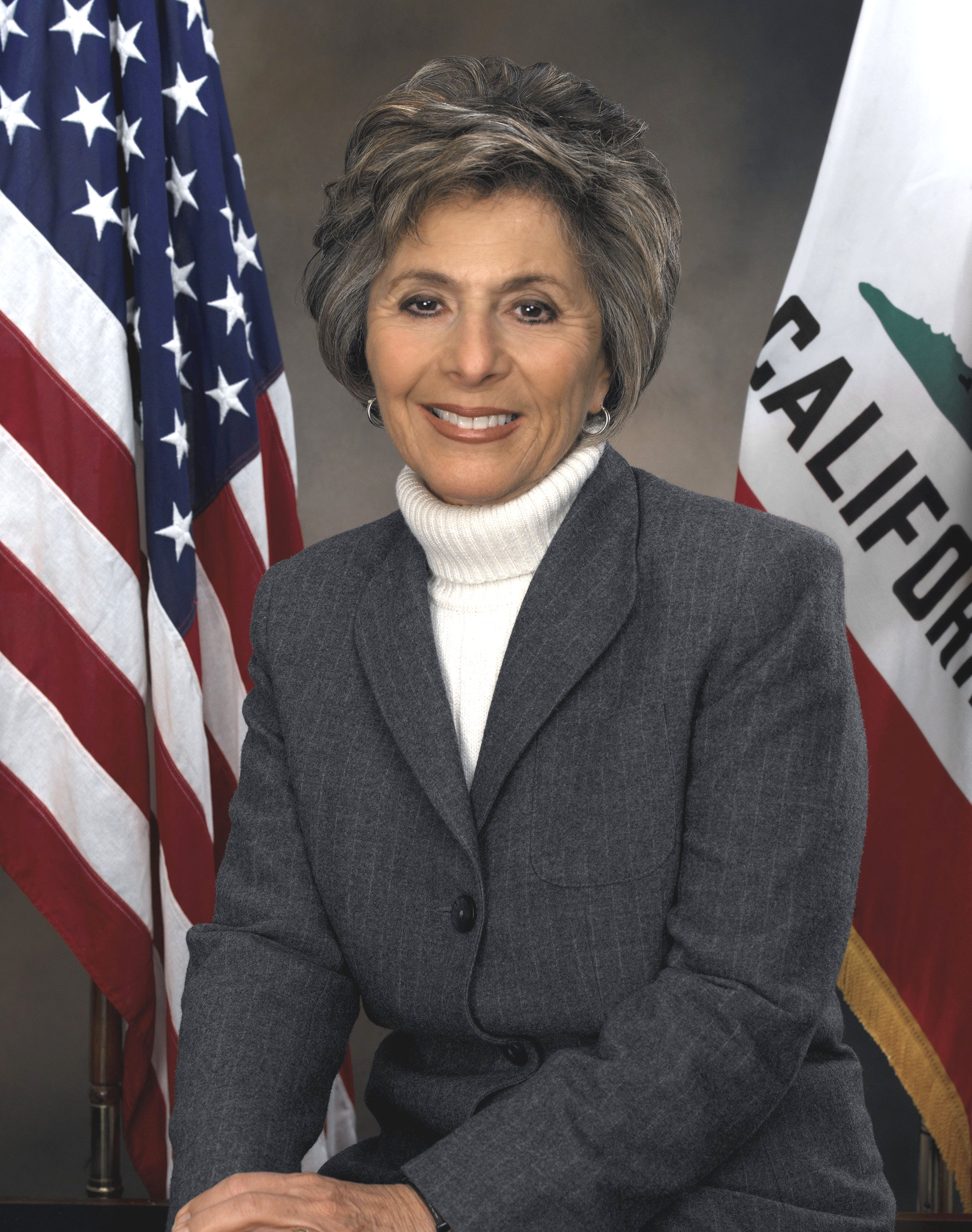
California senator and representative Barbara Boxer (B.A. 1962)

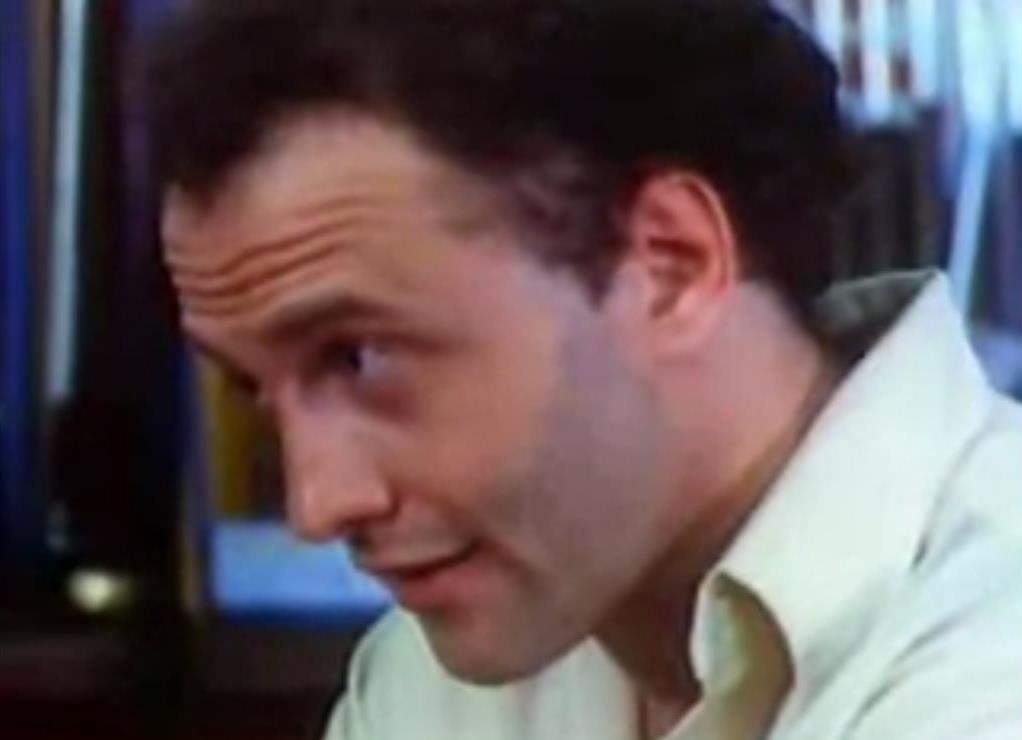
Robert Kerman also known as R. Bolla, Prolific pornographic actor (B.A. 1970)

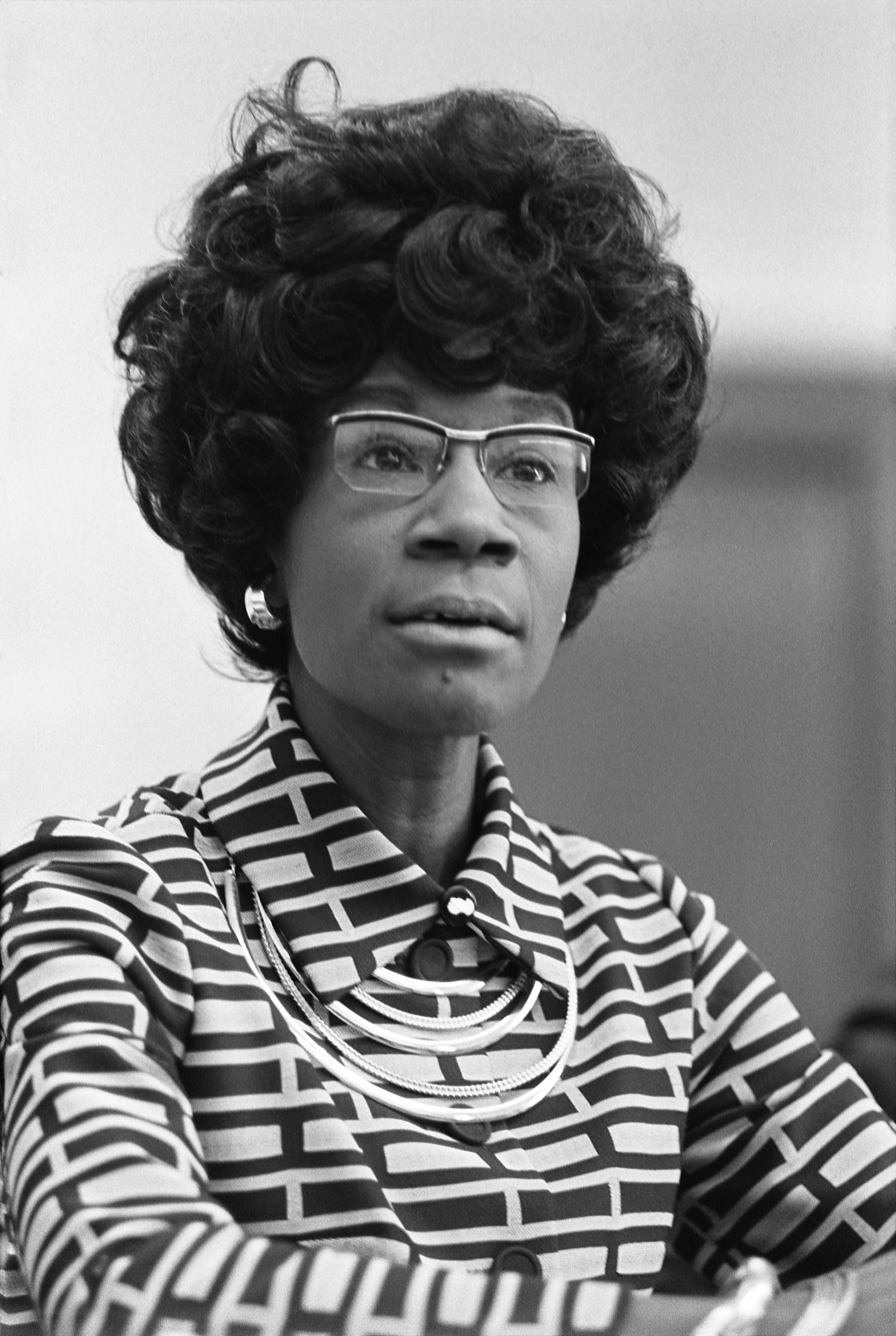
Shirley Chisholm, first black woman elected to US Congress (B.A. 1946)

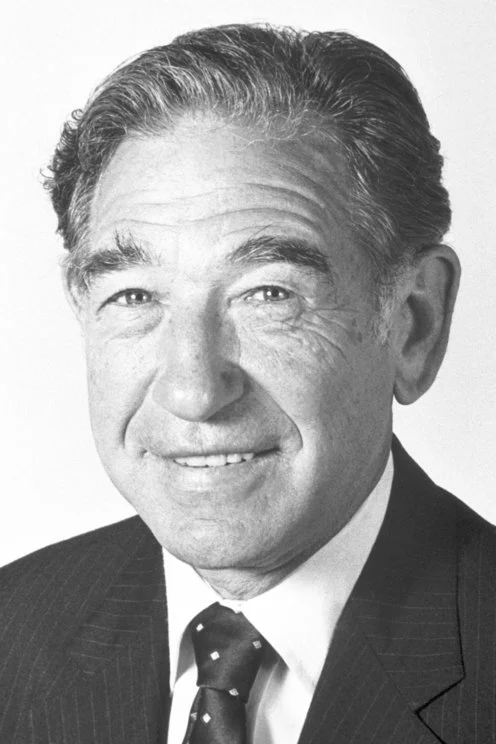
Biochemist and Nobel Laureate Stanley Cohen (B.A. 1943)

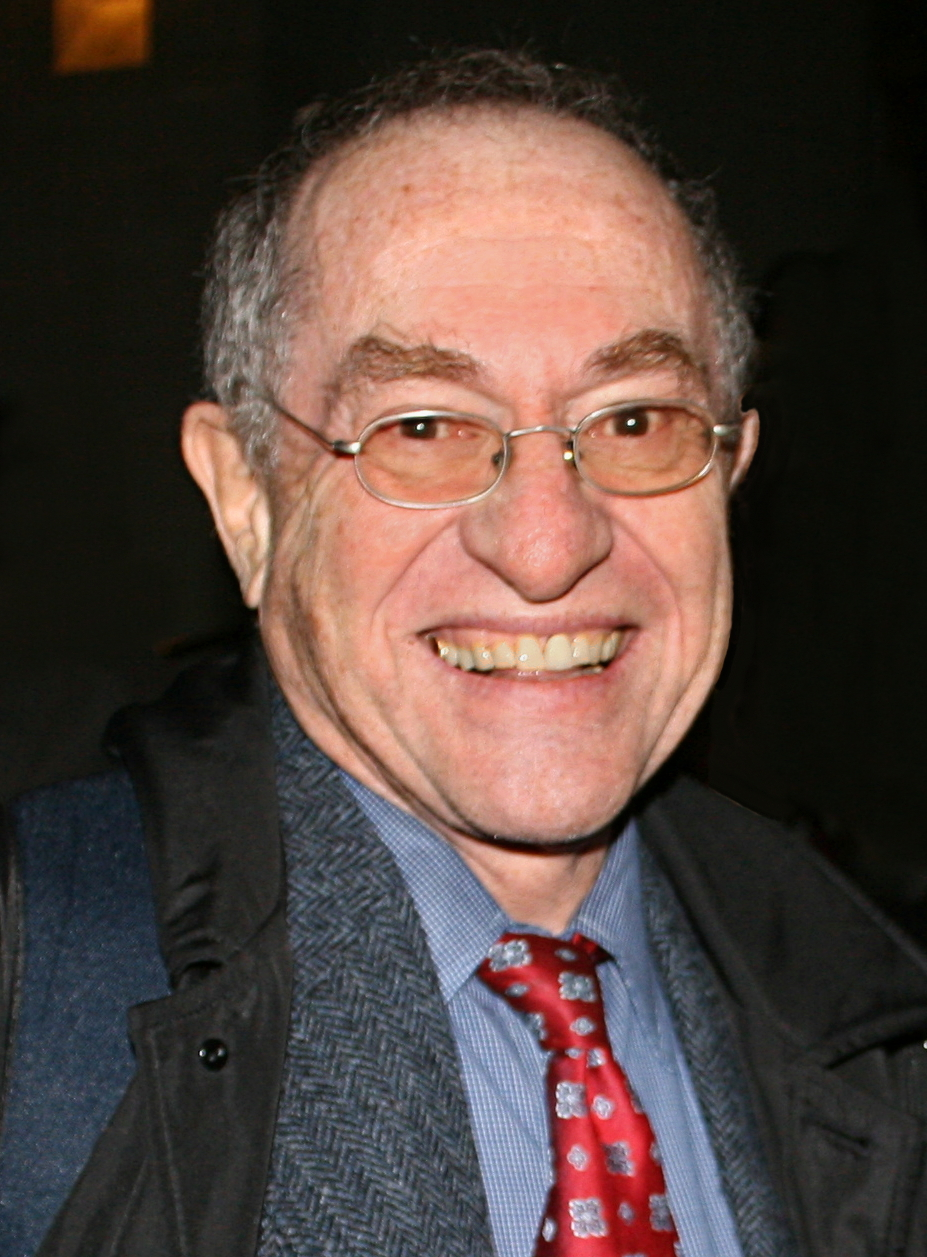
Alan Dershowitz, attorney and law professor (B.A. 1959)

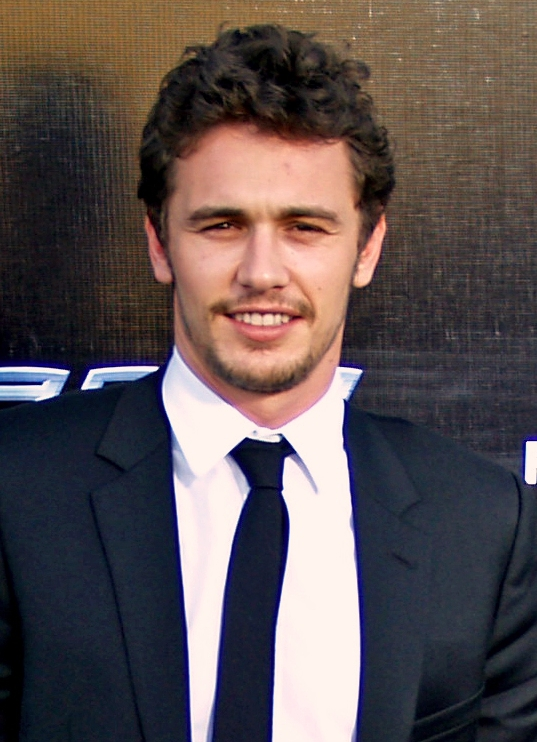
James Franco, actor (M.F.A.)

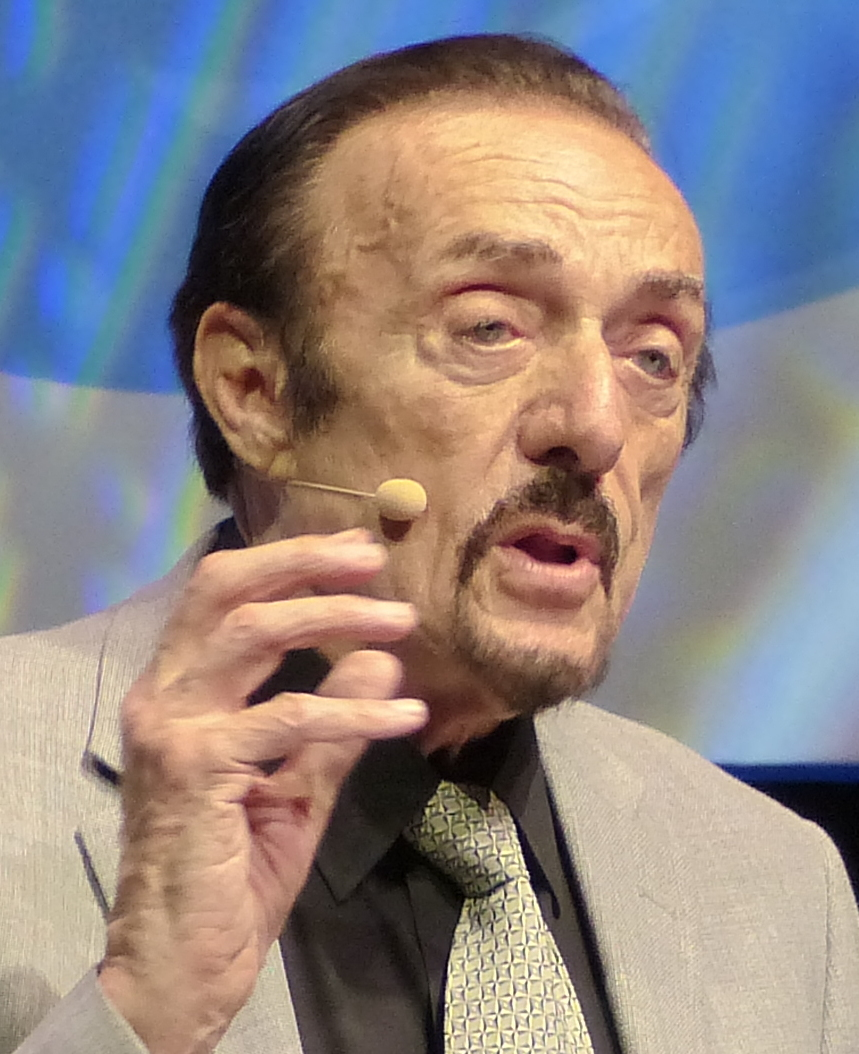
Social psychologist Philip Zimbardo (B.A. 1954)

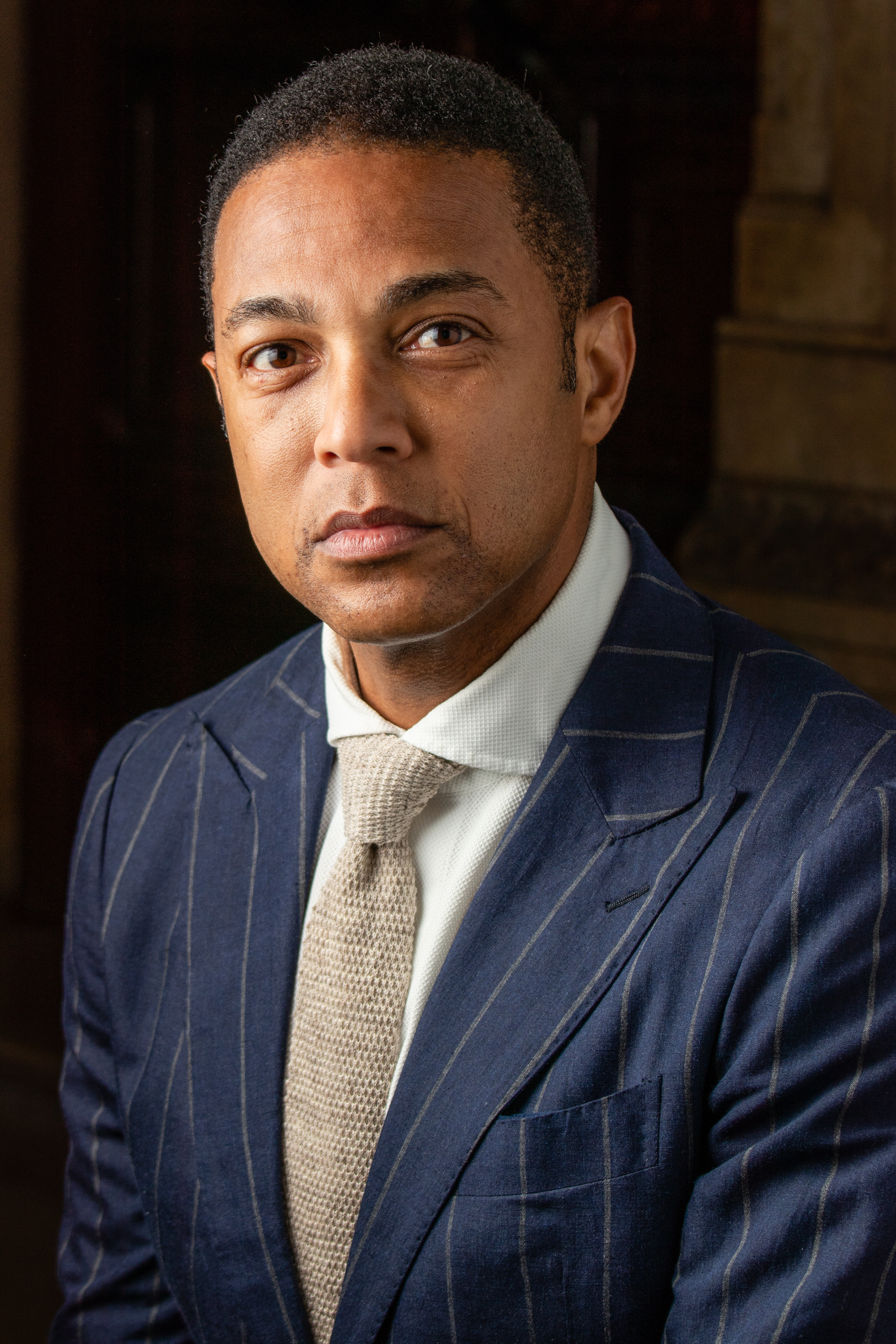
Don Lemon, RTNDA Edward R. Murrow Award and Regional Emmy Award winning former CNN news anchor and journalist (B.A. 1996)

Notable alumni of Brooklyn College in government include Senate majority leader and 1996 Republican presidential nominee: Bob Dole who was stationed at Brooklyn College while attending the Army Specialized Training Program (1943–1944), Senator Bernie Sanders who attended the college 1959–1960 before transferring to the University of Chicago, Senator Barbara Boxer (née Barbara Levy; B.A. 1962), Congresswoman Shirley Chisholm (B.A. 1946), Securities and Exchange Commission chairmen Manuel F. Cohen (B.S. 1933) and Harvey Pitt (B.A. 1965), and federal judges Rosemary S. Pooler (B.A. 1959), Jack B. Weinstein (B.A. 1943), Sterling Johnson Jr. (B.A. 1963), Edward R. Korman (B.A. 1963), Joel Harvey Slomsky (B.A. 1967), and Jason K. Pulliam (B.A. 1995; M.A. 1997).

Notable alumni in business include Deloitte Touche Tohmatsu CEO Barry Salzberg (B.S. 1974), Adobe Inc. CEO Bruce Chizen (B.S. 1978), Warner Bros. and Los Angeles Dodgers CEO Robert A. Daly, New York Mets President Saul Katz (B.A. 1960), Boston Celtics owner Marvin Kratter (1937), David Geffen, New Line Cinema CEO Michael Lynne (B.A. 1961), CBS Records CEO Walter Yetnikoff (B.A. 1953), Vanguard Records co-founder Maynard Solomon (B.A. 1950), and Gannett Chairman Marjorie Magner (B.S. 1969).

Notable alumni in the sciences and academia include Nobel Prize–winning biochemist Stanley Cohen (B.A. 1943), Fields Medal–winning mathematician Paul Cohen (1953), social psychologists Stanley Milgram (B.A. 1954) and Philip Zimbardo (B.A. 1954), Harvard Law School professor and author Alan M. Dershowitz (A.B. 1959), Columbia Law School Dean Barbara Aronstein Black (B.A. 1953), California State University Chancellor Barry Munitz (B.A. 1963), City College of New York President Lisa Staiano-Coico (B.S. 1976), and NASA scientist and College of William & Mary professor Joel S. Levine (B.S. 1964).

Notable alumni in the arts include Academy, Emmy, and Tony Award–winning director, writer, and actor Mel Brooks (born Melvin Kaminsky; 1946), Golden Globe Award–winning actor James Franco (M.F.A. 2009), Emmy Award–winning actor Jimmy Smits (B.A. 1980), prolific pornographic film actor R. Bolla (B.A. 1970), Academy Award–winning screenwriter Frank Tarloff (B.A.), Academy Award-nominated filmmakers Paul Mazursky (B.A. 1952) and Oren Moverman (B.A. 1992), Sopranos stars Steve Schirripa (B.A. 1980) and Dominic Chianese (B.A. 1961), director Joel Zwick (1962; M.A. 1968), Grammy Award winner Peter Nero (born Bernard Nierow; B.A. 1956), O. Henry Award–winning author Irwin Shaw (born Irwin Shamforoff; B.A. 1934); and a number of Pulitzer Prize winners: author Frank McCourt (M.A. 1967), playwrights Howard Sackler (B.A. 1950) and Annie Baker (M.F.A. 2009), journalists Sylvan Fox (B.A. 1951), Stanley Penn (1947), and Harold C. Schonberg (B.A. 1937), photographer Max Desfor, and historian Oscar Handlin (B.A. 1934).

Other notable alumni include Olympic fencers Ralph Goldstein and Nikki Franke (B.S. 1972), chess grandmaster and five-time U.S. champion Gata Kamsky (B.A. 1999), Jewish Defense League founder Meir Kahane (B.A. 1954), and civil rights activist Al Sharpton who dropped out after two years in 1975.

=== Notable faculty ===
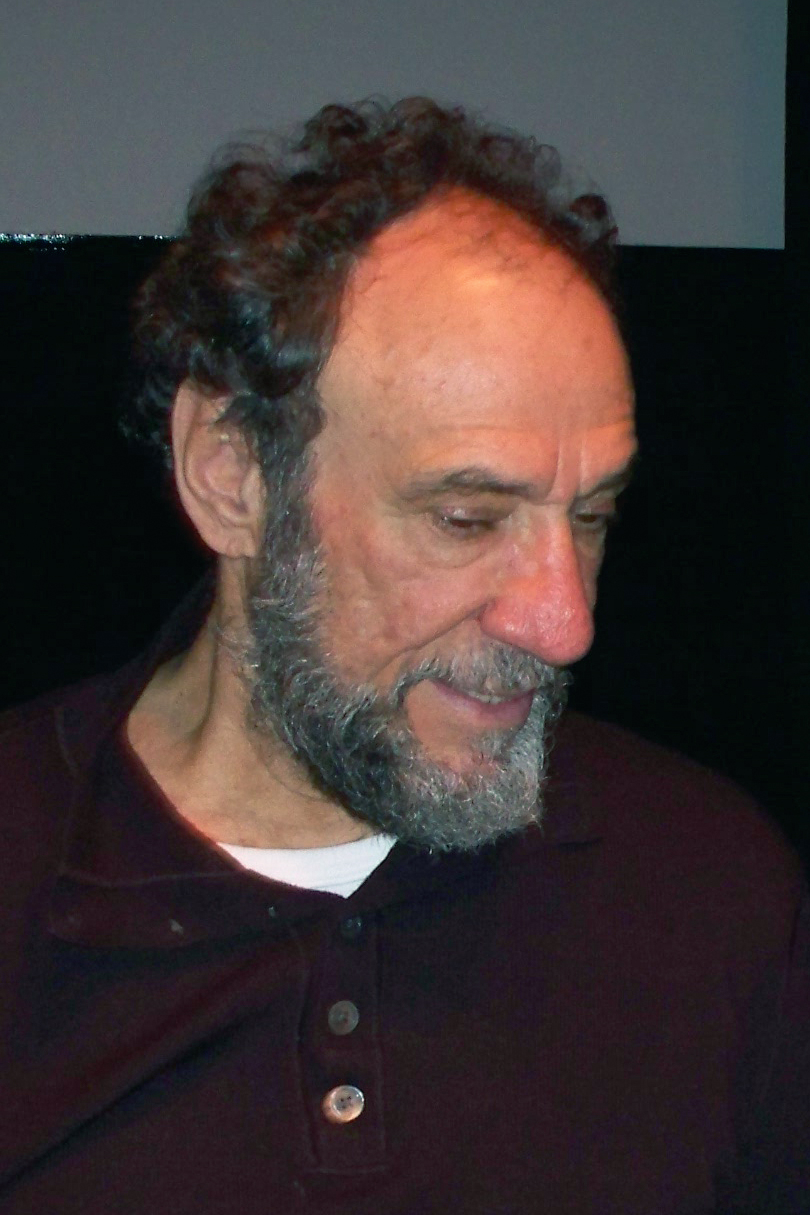
F. Murray Abraham

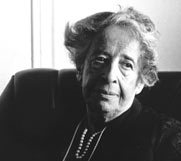
Hannah Arendt

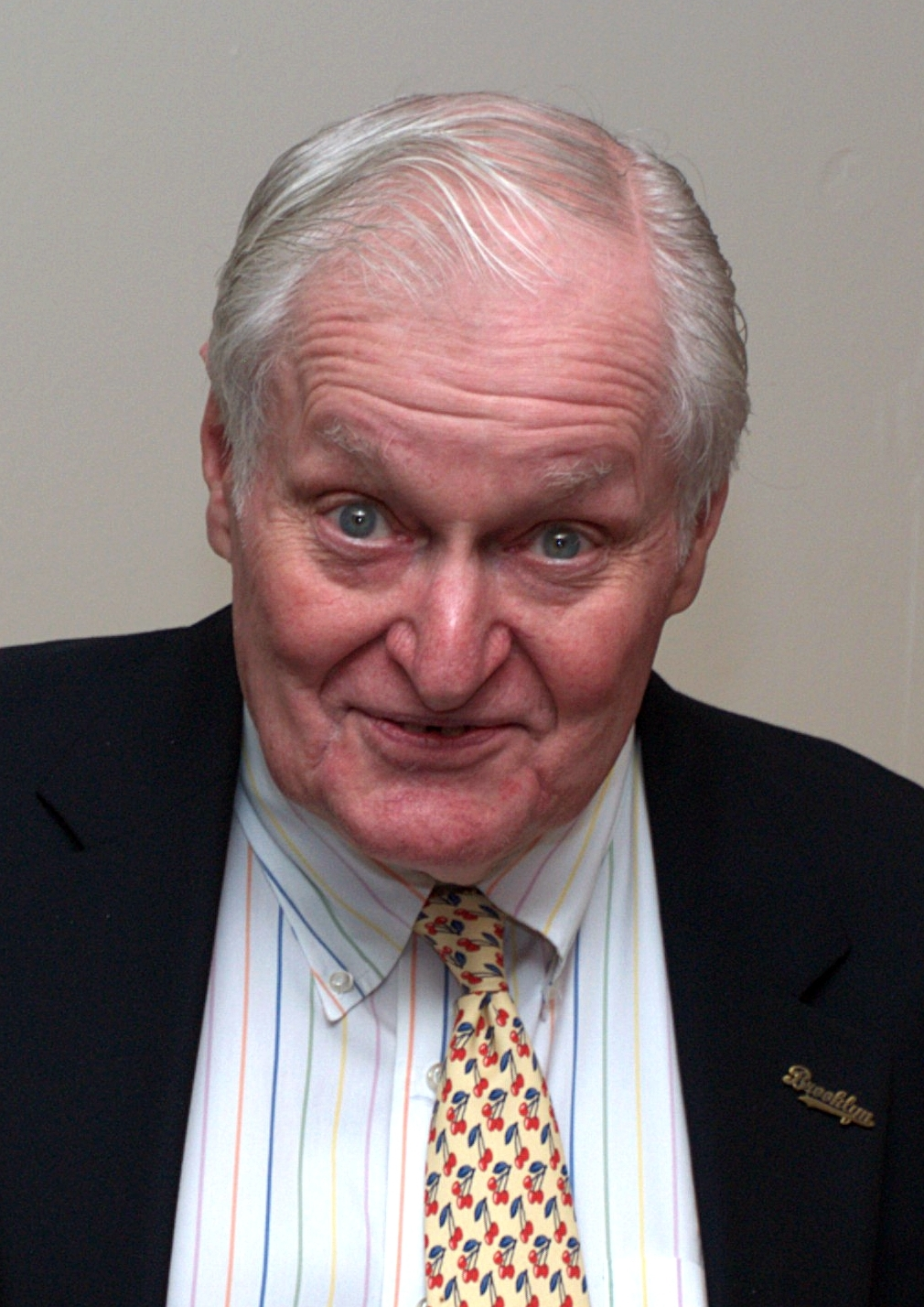
John Ashbery

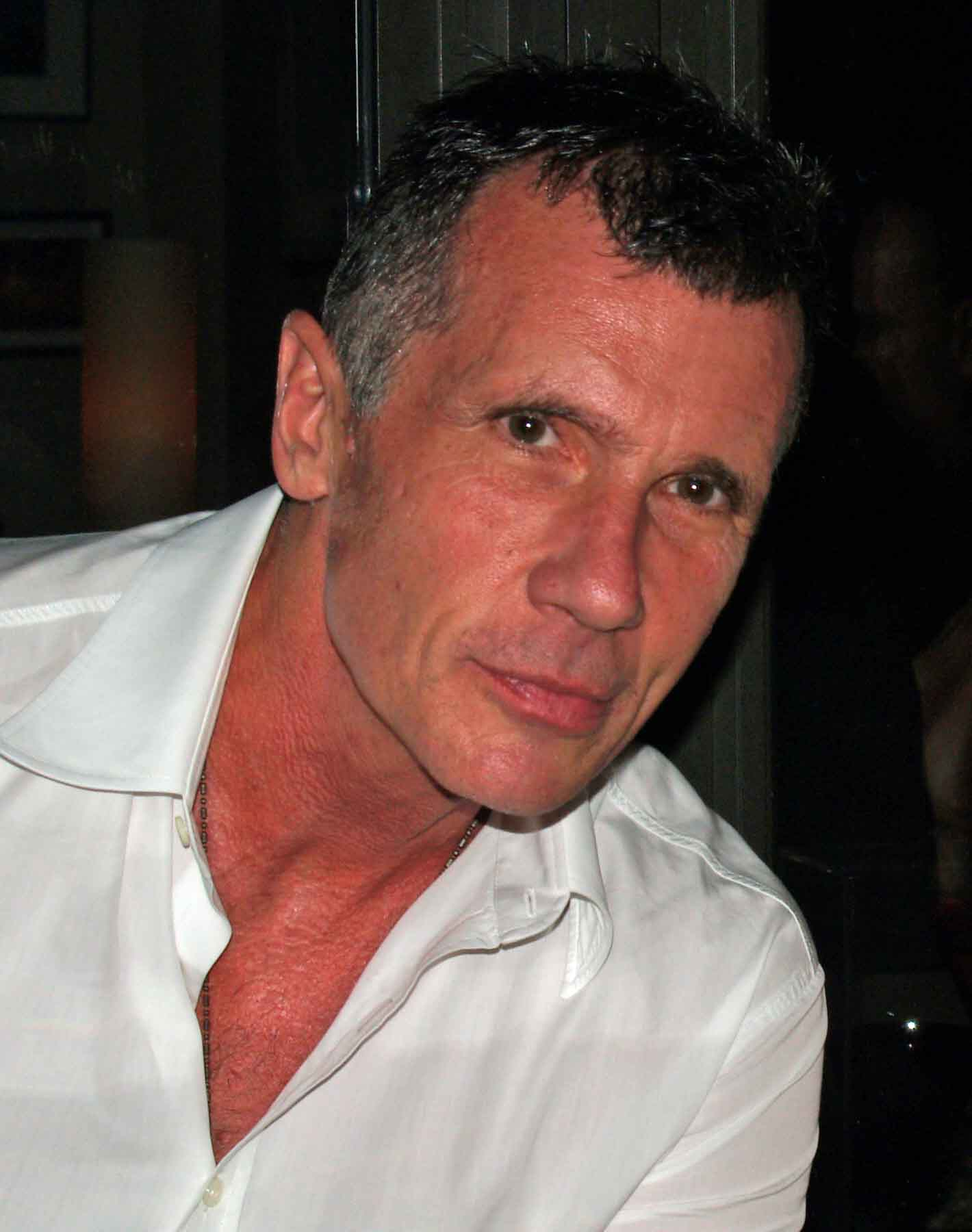
Michael Cunningham

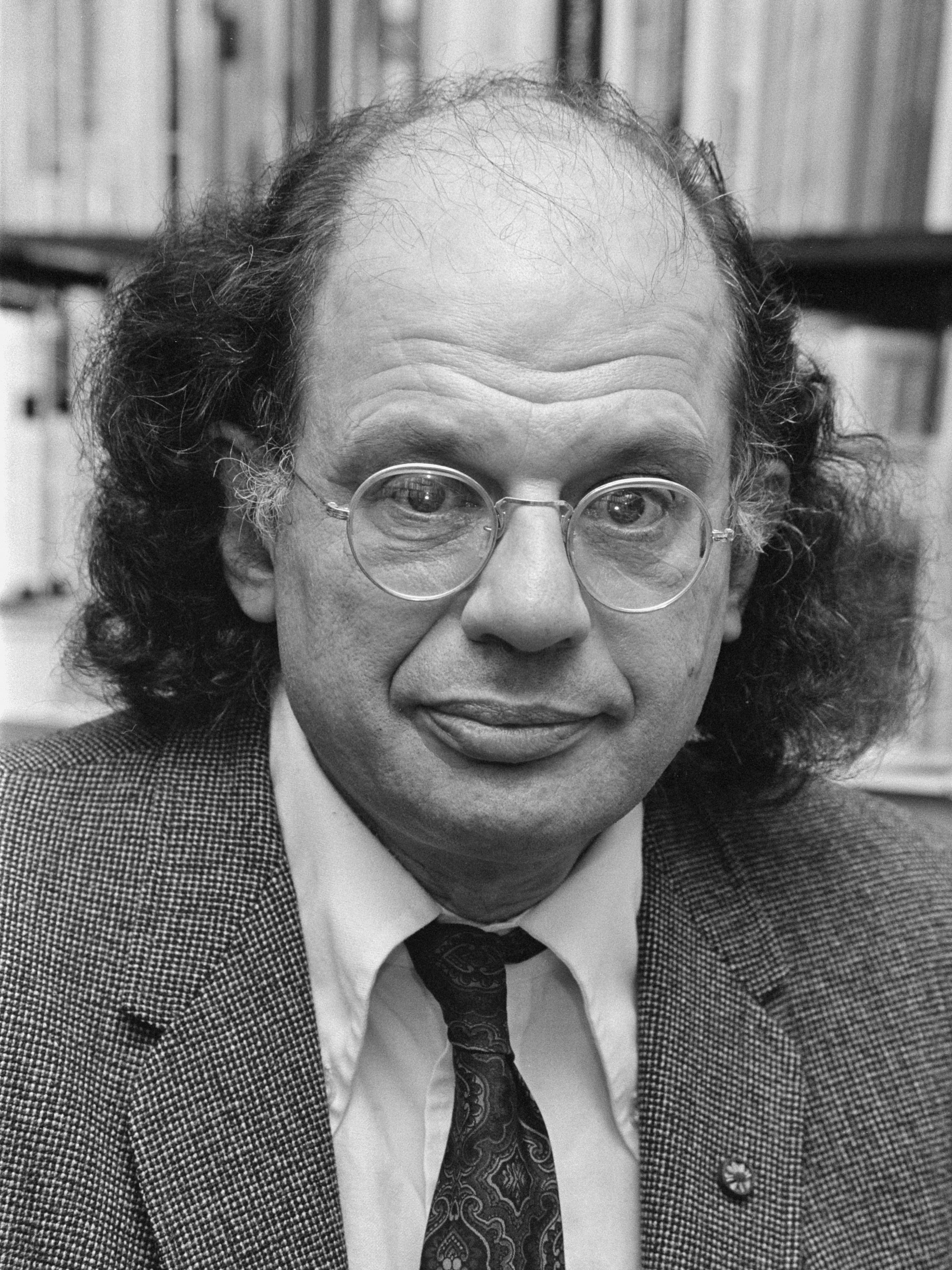
Allen Ginsberg

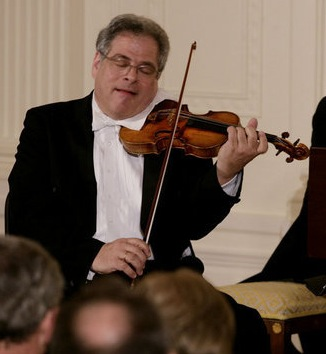
Itzhak Perlman

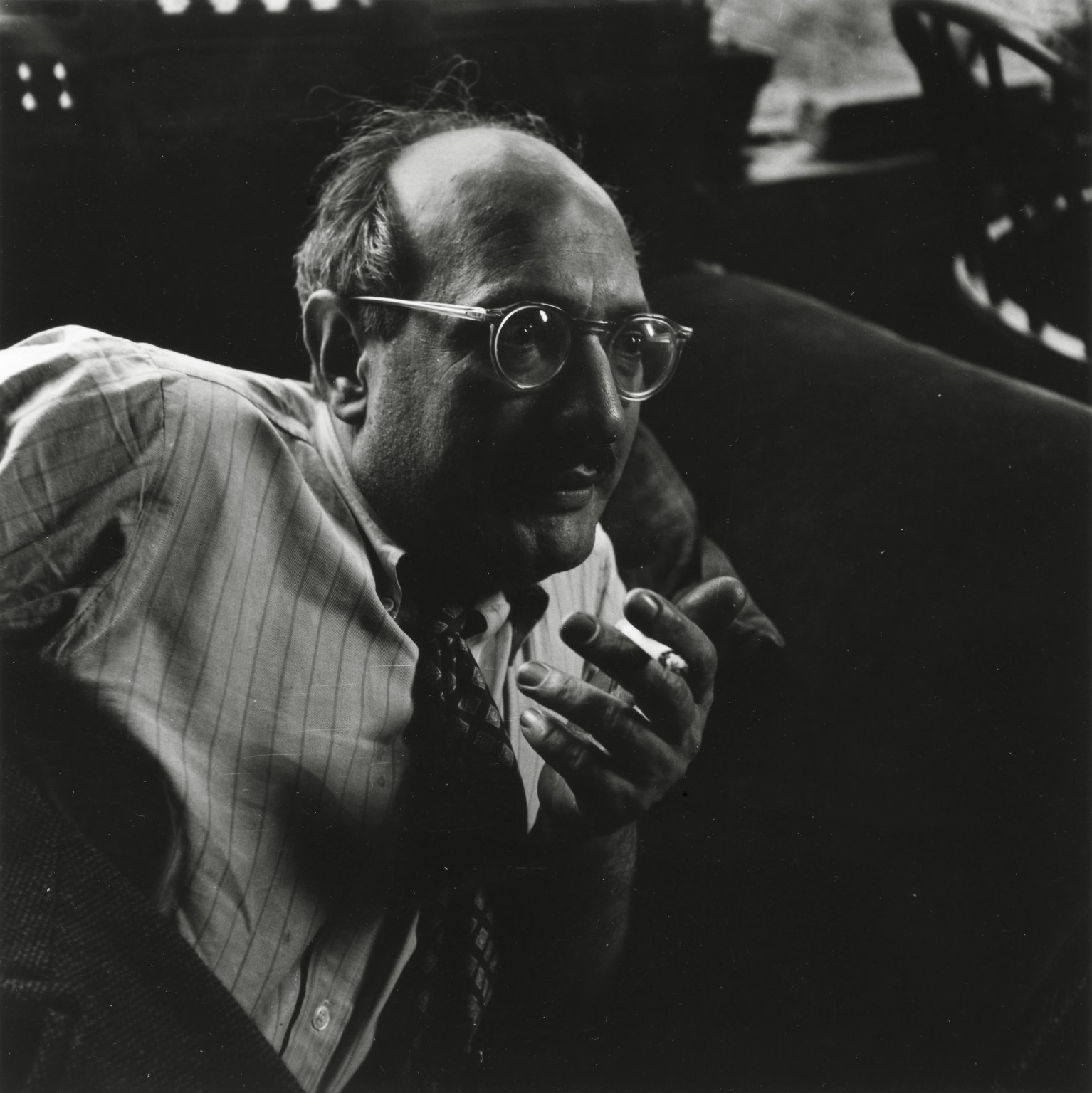
Mark Rothko

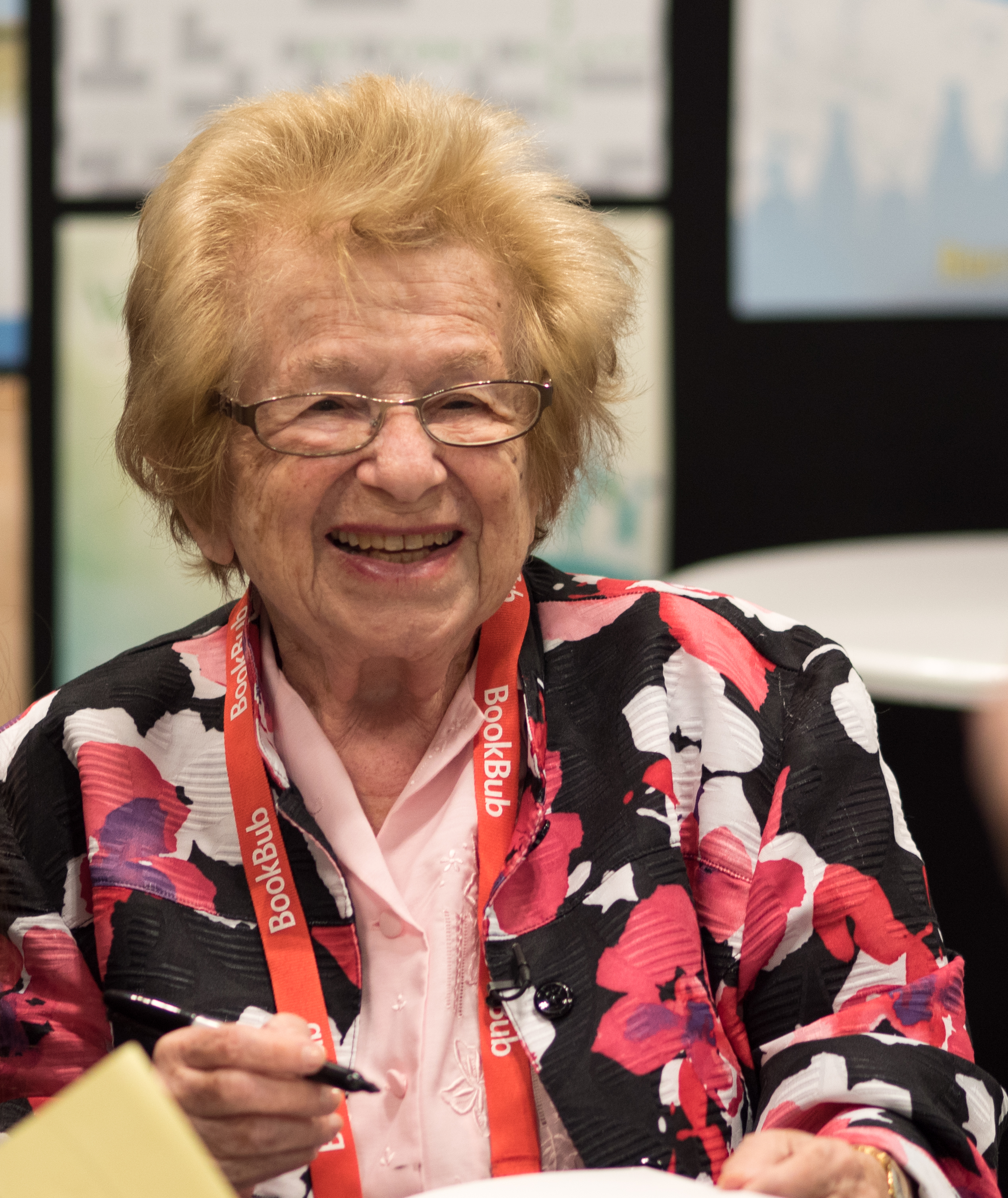
Dr. Ruth

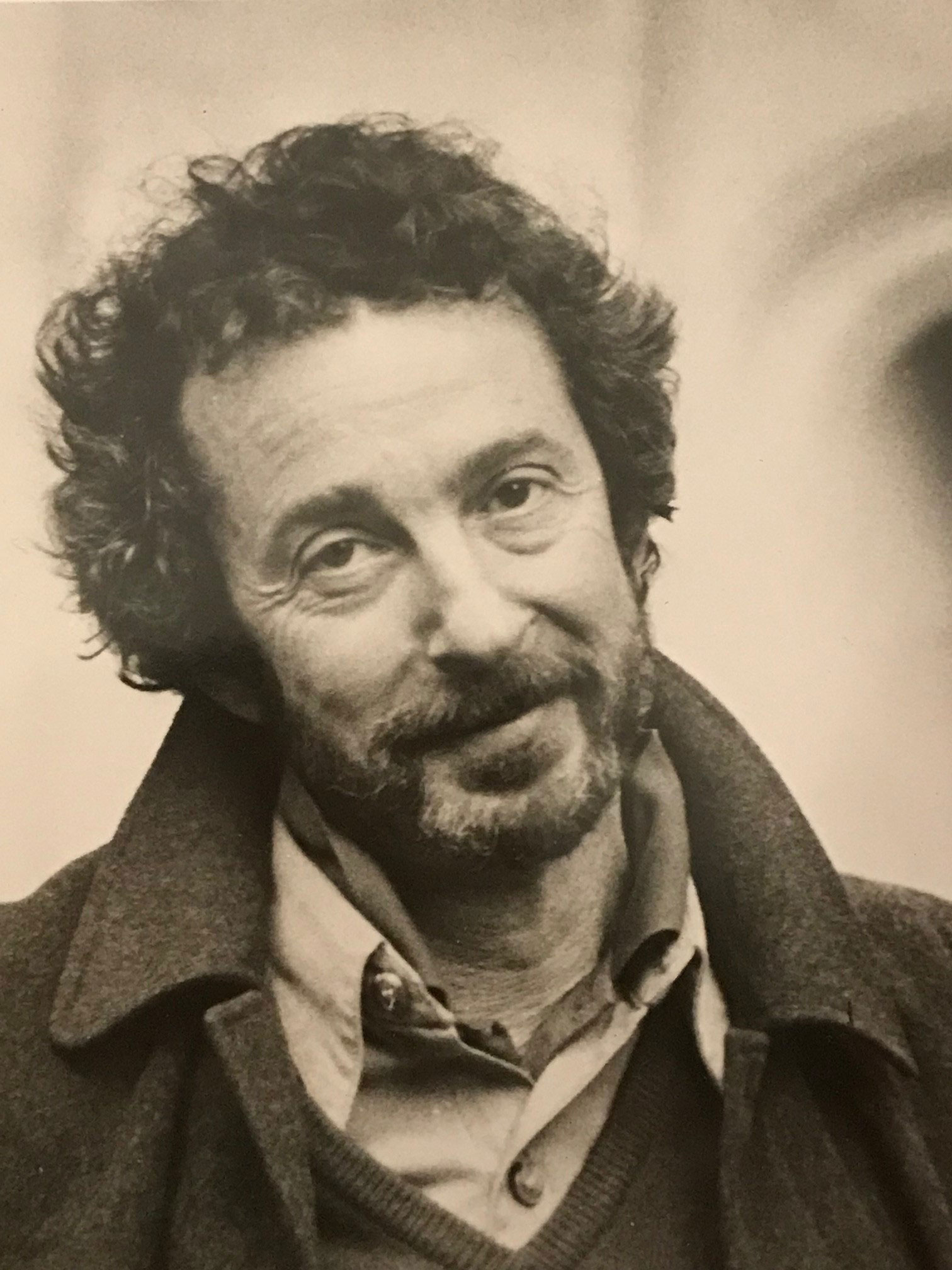
C. K. Williams
- F. Murray Abraham (born 1939), actor of stage and screen; professor of theater, winner of the Academy Award for Best Actor
- Vito Acconci, designer, landscape architect, performance and installation artist
- Solomon Asch, social psychologist
- Dorothy Inez Adams (1904–1967), anthropologist
- Eric Alterman (born 1960), liberal journalist
- Lennart Anderson, figurative painter
- Hannah Arendt, philosopher and political theorist; author of The Origins of Totalitarianism (1951) and The Human Condition (1958)
- Solomon Asch, Polish-American Gestalt psychologist and pioneer in social psychology
- John Ashbery (1927–2017), poet, Pulitzer Prize for Poetry winner; tenured faculty member from c. 1972 to 1986
- Robert Beauchamp, painter
- Maír José Benardete, scholar of Sephardic studies and Professor of Spanish and Sephardic Studies
- Adele Bildersee (1883–1971), English professor, dean; one of the college's founding faculty members
- William Boylan (1869–1940), first president of Brooklyn College
- Edwin G. Burrows (1943–2018), historian; Pulitzer Prize for History winner for co-writing Gotham: A History of New York City to 1898 with Mike Wallace
- Frances Sergeant Childs, historian; one of the college's founding faculty members
- Margaret Clapp, scholar, winner of the Pulitzer Prize for Biography or Autobiography, President of Wellesley College
- Michael Cunningham (born 1952), novelist; winner of Pulitzer Prize for Fiction and PEN/Faulkner Award for The Hours
- Rudy D'Amico (born 1940), professional National Basketball Association scout, and former Brooklyn College and professional basketball coach who coached Maccabi Tel Aviv to the Euroleague Championship
- Annette Danto , filmmaker, author, and Undergraduate Film Department Chair
- Lois Dodd (born 1927), painter
- Charles Dodge (born 1942), composer, founder of the Center for Computer Music
- Alphonsus J. Donlon, President of Georgetown University
- Paul Edwards (born Paul Eisenstein), Professor of Philosophy, editor of the Encyclopedia of Philosophy
- John Hope Franklin, historian of the US, former chairman of the History Department, president of Phi Beta Kappa, and recipient of the Presidential Medal of Freedom
- Jack Gelber, playwright and theater director; taught at Brooklyn College 1972–2003
- Allen Ginsberg (1926–1997), Beat Generation poet and Pulitzer Prize for Poetry finalist; Distinguished Professor of English from 1986 to 1997, replacing Ashbery (who accepted a MacArthur Fellowship and later moved to Bard College)
- Betty Glad, Chair of Political Science at the University of Illinois
- Ralph Goldstein (1913–1997), Olympic épée fencer
- Joel Glucksman (born 1949), Olympic saber fencer
- Maxine Greene (née Meyer), William F. Russell Professor in the Foundations of Education at Teachers College, Columbia University
- David Grubbs (born 1967), musician, composer, recording artist
- Carey Harrison (born 1944), novelist/dramatist
- Amy Hempel (born 1951), short story writer, journalist, and coordinator of the MFA Fiction-Writing Program
- Seymour L. Hess, meteorologist and planetary scientist
- Shintaro Higashi, 6th degree black belt in judo, 2007 and 2011 USA Judo Senior National Champion
- Agnieszka Holland (born 1948), film director, best known for Europa Europa (1992)
- Carl Holty, painter
- Karen Brooks Hopkins, President of the Brooklyn Academy of Music
- John Hospers, first presidential candidate of the US Libertarian Party; professor 1956–66
- Paul Jacobs, classical pianist; specialist in modern music
- KC Johnson, professor of American history
- Mburumba Kerina (1932–2021), Deputy Speaker of the Constituent Assembly of Namibia
- Béla Király (1912–2009), professor emeritus, former Hungarian general taught military history and central European history
- Jerome Krase, professor emeritus of sociology at the Murray Koppelman School of Business
- Alfred McClung Lee, Chairman of the Sociology and Anthropology departments at Wayne University and Brooklyn College
- Tania León, Cuban-born composer and conductor, Pulitzer Prize for Music winner
- Don Lemon, CNN anchor and journalist
- Ben Lerner, poet and writer
- Ira N. Levine (1937–2015), author and professor in the Chemistry Department
- Abraham Maslow, psychologist in the school of humanistic psychology, best known for his theory of human motivation which led to a therapeutic technique known as self-actualization; taught 1937–1951
- Wilson Carey McWilliams, political scientist, author of The Idea of Fraternity in America (1973, University of California Press), for which he won the National Historical Society prize in 1974
- Denise O'Connor (born 1935), Olympic foil fencer
- Carol J. Oja, musicologist and scholar of American Studies, William Powell Mason Professor at Harvard University
- Ursula Oppens, pianist, co-founded the contemporary music ensemble Speculum Musicae, Conservatory of Music
- Philip Pearlstein, Distinguished Professor Emeritus, influential painter known for his Modernist Realism nudes
- Itzhak Perlman, violinist, Conservatory of Music
- Roman Popadiuk, US Ambassador to Ukraine
- Tubby Raskin (1902–1981), basketball player and coach
- Arthur S. Reber (1970–2005), Broeklundian Professor of Psychology, known for his research on implicit learning
- Inez Smith Reid, Senior Judge of the District of Columbia Court of Appeals
- Walter Rosenblum, photographer who documented action during World War II; taught at Brooklyn College for 40 years
- Mark Rothko (born Markus Yakovlevich Rothkowitz; 1903–1970), influential abstract expressionist painter
- Susan Fromberg Schaeffer, novelist and Broeklundian Professor of English
- Albert Schatz, microbiologist, co-discoverer of streptomycin
- William Schimmel, composer
- Michel Sebastiani, Olympic fencing coach and member of the US Fencing Association Hall of Fame
- Mitchell Silver, Commissioner of the New York City Parks Department
- Mabel Murphy Smythe-Haith, Ambassador for the United States to Cameroon and later Equatorial Guinea
- Stephen Solarz, US Congressional Representative from New York
- Eileen Southern, musicologist, researcher, author, and teacher
- Mark Strand, United States Poet Laureate, Pulitzer Prize for Poetry–winning poet, essayist, and translator
- Glenn Thrush, Politico senior writer, author
- Hans L. Trefousse, Distinguished Emeritus Professor of History; taught 1946–1998, historian and author
- Mervin F. Verbit, chair of the Sociology Department at Touro College
- Carleton Washburne, Director of Teacher Education, known for his progressive education works
- Mac Wellman, Obie Award–winning playwright, author, and poet
- Ruth Westheimer (better known as Dr. Ruth; born Karola Ruth Siegel, 1928), German-American sex therapist, author, radio, television talk show host, former Haganah sniper, and Holocaust survivor
- C. K. Williams, poet, won the Pulitzer Prize for Poetry
- Ethyle R. Wolfe, professor from 1947 to 1989, created the Ethyle R. Wolfe Humanities Institute at the college.
- Theresa Wolfson, Professor of Labor Economics, won the John Dewey Award of the League for Industrial Democracy
- Joel Zwick (born 1942), professor in the Film Department, director of Full House, Fuller House, Family Matters, My Big Fat Greek Wedding, and Fat Albert
- Ad Reinhardt, Elizabeth Murray, Vito Acconci, William T. Williams, Archie Rand, Jennifer McCoy, Patricia Cronin

== In popular culture ==
The Brooklyn College campus was used as the location for a college in the FX TV Series The Americans.
