= Roberts and Barrand =

- Also known as: John Roberts and Tony Barrand
- Origin: Cornell University
- Genres: Traditional folk music
- Years active: 1969—2022
- Label: Golden Hind Music
- Website: http://www.goldenhindmusic.com/

Roberts and Barrand was a musical group formed in 1968 by John Roberts and Tony Barrand while they were graduate students in psychology at Cornell University. Much of their repertoire is traditional English music (including many prominent recordings of sea shanties), although they have also recorded other English-language and contemporary folk songs.

They released their debut album, Spencer the Rover Is Alive and Well and Living In Ithaca, in 1971. This was followed in 1973 by second album, Across the Western Ocean, a collection of English sea shanties. The duo also performed as members of the four-man act Nowell Sing We Clear.

Tony Barrand died on 29 January 2022, at the age of 76. John Roberts died on 3 February 2025, at the age of 80.

== Discography ==
=== Spencer the Rover is Alive and Well... (1971, 2001) ===
1. "Spencer the Rover"
2. "Creeping Jane"
3. "I Wish They'd do it Now"
4. "Rambleaway"
5. "What a Mouth!"
6. "The Knight and the Shepherd's Daughter"
7. "Silicosis"
8. "The Coachman"
9. "The Lincolnshire Poacher"
10. "Warlike Seamen"
11. "Down the Plughole"
12. "Shine Your Buttons with Brasso"
13. "Martin Said to His Man"
14. "Fanny Blair"
15. "So Green as the Leaves"
16. "Babylon is Fallen"
17. "Thyme"

=== Across the Western Ocean (1973, 2000) ===
1. Introduction
2. "New York Girls"
3. Captain Samuels on his sailors
4. "Blow the Man Down"
5. Impressions of a first voyage
6. "The Crayfish"
7. "The Black Cook"
8. "The Limejuice Ship"
9. The wreck of the Staffordshire
10. "The Flying Dutchman"
11. "Get Up Jack, John Sit Down"
12. "The Flying Cloud"
13. "Immigration Conditions"
14. "Heave Away My Johnnies"
15. "Perils of Transatlantic Dalliance"
16. "Maggie May"
17. "Peter Street"
18. "The Seamen's Hymn"

=== Mellow With Ale From the Horn (1975) ===
1. "Save Your Money While You're Young"
2. "Staines Morris"
3. "Barbara Allen"
4. "Salt River, Colored Aristocracy"
5. "Oats and Beans and Barley Grows"
6. "Kate and Her Horns"
7. "Come Day, go Day (Glyn Hughes)"
8. "The Albatross"
9. "The Wings of a Goney"
10. "The Handsome Cabin Boy"
11. "File Foot Flirt"
12. "Our Bill"
13. "Albert and the Lion"
14. "Salvation Band"

=== Dark Ships in the Forest (1977, 1997) ===
With Fred Breunig & Steve Woodruff

1. "Oak, Ash and Thorn"
2. "The Broomfield Wager"
3. "The Wife of Usher's Well"
4. "Tom of Bedlam"
5. "The Dreadful Ghost"
6. "The Foggy Dew"
7. "The Derby Ram"
8. "The Maid on the Shore"
9. "Reynardine"
10. "The False Lady"
11. "Polly Vaughn"
12. "The Two Magicians"

=== Live at Holsteins! (1983) ===
1. "John Barleycorn"
2. "The Man that Waters the Workers' Beer"
3. "Garners Gay"
4. "Three Drunken Maidens"
5. "Congleton Bear"
6. "The Rolling Mills of New Jersey"
7. "Eat Bertha's Mussels"
8. "Boozing"
9. "The Ballad of the Cowpuncher"
10. "Newman's Ale"
11. "The Man at the Nore"
12. "The Barley Mow"

=== An Evening at the English Music Hall (live, 1984) ===
With Maggi Pierce, David Jones, Andy Barrand, Louis Killen, and Murray Callahan; recorded in 1974

1. "A Little Bit of Cucumber" (John Roberts)
2. "Don't Have Any More Mrs. Moore!" (Maggi Pierce)
3. "My Old Dutch" (David Jones)
4. "Lily of Laguna" (Andy Barrand)
5. "Sweeney Todd the Barber" (Tony Barrand)
6. "Last Neet" (Louise Killen)
7. "Sam Hall" (David Jones)
8. "When I Take My Morning Promenade" (Murray Callahan)
9. "I'm Shy, Mary Ellen, I'm Shy" (Tony Barrand)
10. "The Old Armchair" (David Jones)

=== A Present from the Gentlemen (1992) ===
1. "Adieu Sweet Lovely Nancy"
2. "Jackie Munro"
3. "Nine Times a Night"
4. "A Smuggler's Song"
5. "The Three Butchers"
6. "The Painful Plough"
7. "Dog and Gun"
8. "The Draggletail Gypsy/The Princess Royal"
9. "The Outlandish Knight"
10. "Robin Hood and the Bishop of Hereford"
11. "Our Hamlet"
12. "Sam Hall"
13. "The Fellow that Played the Trombone"
14. Great War Trilogy:
  - "The Valley of the Shadow"
  - "The Old Barbed Wire"
  - “Long, Long Trail"

=== Naulakha Redux (1997) ===
1. "Ford o' Kabul River"
2. "Tommy"
3. "Sir Richard's Song"
4. "The Land"
5. "Philadelphia"
6. "Cells"
7. "Mandalay"
8. "An Astrologer's Song"
9. "The Ballad of Minepit Shaw"
10. "Song of the Men's Side"
11. "The Liner She's a Lady"
12. "Frankie's Trade"
13. "We Have Fed Our Sea"
14. "A Carol"
15. "Danny Deever"
16. "Follow Me 'Ome"

=== Heartoutbursts (1998) ===
1. "Brigg Fair"
2. "Seventeen Come Sunday"
3. "Creeping Jane"
4. "Turpin Hero"
5. "The White Hare"
6. "Rufford Park Poachers"
7. "Lord Bateman"
8. "The Gypsy's Wedding Day"
9. "A Fair Maid Walking"
10. "The Lost Lady Found"
11. "Sprig of Thyme"
12. "Riding Down to Portsmouth"
13. "Horkstow Grange"
14. "The "Rainbow""
15. "William Taylor"
16. "Lord Melbourne"
17. "Lisbon"
18. "Died for Love"

=== Twiddlum Twaddlum (live, 2003) ===
- "Anchor Song"
- "The Golden Vanity"
- "High Barbary"
- "Jonah and the Grampus"
- "A Pilgrim¹s Way"
- "Old Bangum"
- "Who Killed Cock Robin?"
- "Two Foxes"
- "All Through The Ale"
- "The Rawtenstall Annual Fair"
- "Nell"
- "The Nutting Girl"
- "Claudy Banks"
- "The Week Before Easter"
- "The Cockerham Devil"
- "Row on"

=== As featured performers in an anthology ===
- Pleasant and Delightful, Vol 2 – Living Folk (1972)
- Songs and Sounds of the Sea – National Geographic Society (1973)
- Clearwater – Hudson River Sloop Restoration (1974)
- The Audience Pleased – Oberlin College (1976)
- Clearwater II – Hudson River Sloop Restoration (1977)
- Champlain Valley Festival Highlights – Champlain Valley Festival (1990)
- Homeward Bound – Revels (2002)
