= Nowell Sing We Clear =

American musical group

- Years active: 1975—2014
- Label: Golden Hind Music
- Members: Fred Breunig; Andy Davis (1987—)
- Past members: John Roberts; Tony Barrand; Steve Woodruff (1975–1986)
- Website: nowellsingweclear.com

Nowell Sing We Clear is a previously four-member musical group that performs an annual yuletide concert series. They have also released a series of related albums and a songbook of their repertoire.

The concerts consist of yuletide stories and music, and often include a Mummers Play.

== Members ==
The group consisted of John Roberts, Tony Barrand, Fred Breunig, and Andy Davis (who replaced original member Steve Woodruff after Woodruff moved to California), until Tony Barrand's passing in January 2022 and John Roberts’ passing in 2025. Their more recent performances have been partnered with the vocal group Windborne of which Fred Breunig's daughter Lauren Breunig is a member.

Credits from first album:

- John Roberts – vocals, English concertina, Anglo concertina
- Tony Barrand – vocals, tambourine
- Fred Breunig – fiddle, harmony vocals
- Steve Woodruff – button accordion, Anglo concertina, penny whistle, harmony vocals

Breunig and Woodruff also appeared as guest artists on the 1977 Roberts and Barrand album Dark Ships in the Forest.

== Discography ==
=== Nowell Sing We Clear (1977) ===
All songs in the public domain except for the one written by Bob Pegg.

Side one

1. "The Truth from Above"/"Masters in This Hall" – 5:21
2. "The Holly and the Ivy" – 2:58
3. "Joys Seven" – 2:30
4. "King Pharim" – 4:06
5. "Coventry Carol" – 1:53
6. "Familiar Carol Medley" – 2:48
7. "The Cherry Tree Carol" – 3:30
8. "Sussex Carol" – 1:44

Side two

1. "Somerset Wassail" – 3:21
2. "The Boar's Head Carol" – 1:58
3. "Dives and Lazarus" – 2:45
4. "The Bitter Withy" – 2:31
5. "An Orkney New Year's Carol" – 2:16
6. "Sword Dance Tunes from the Village of Sleights" – 3:22
7. "Rise Up, Jock!" (Bob Pegg) – 5:17

=== To Welcome in the Spring (1980) ===
This album consists of New Years and spring themed recordings.

1. "Candlemas Eve"
2. "Mothering Sunday"
3. "Gabriel's Message"
4. "All in the Morning"
5. "The Merchant's Carol"
6. "The Leaves of Life (or The Seven Virgins)"
7. "The Lamb of God"
8. "My Dancing Day"
9. "The Sound of the Drum/Ninety-Five"
10. "The Month of May"
11. "Country Dance Medley: Trip to Paris/Knole Park"
12. "The Moon Shines Bright (or The Bellman's Song)"
13. "The Football Match"
14. "The Whitsun Song"
15. "Come Lasses and Lads/Packington's Pound"
16. "Northhill May Song"

=== The Second Nowell (1981) ===
1. "The Cutty Wren"
2. "Six Jolly Miners"
3. "Medley of Long Sword Tunes from the Village of Grenoside and Ampleforth"
4. "Milford"
5. "A Child This Day Is Born"
6. "While Shepherds Watched"
7. "Lord of the Dance"
8. "The Praise of Christmas"
9. "Green Grow the Rushes, O"
10. "Gloucestershire Wassail"
11. "Sherburne"
12. "Apple Tree Wassail"/"The Derby Ram"
13. "The Wren (The King)"

=== Nowell Sing We Clear, Vol. 3 (1985) ===
1. "Masters in this Hall"
2. "Star in the East"
3. "The Carnal and the Crane"/"King Herod and the Cock"/"The Miraculous Harvest"
4. "O Little Town of Bethlehem"
5. "Leaping and Dancing"
6. "Sherbourne"
7. "Gower Wassail"
8. "Kris Kringle"
9. "Winter/Spring"
10. "Flower Carol"
11. "Green Grow'th the Holly"
12. "Morris and Sword Tune Medley"
13. "Carol for New Year's Day"

=== Nowell Sing We Four (1988) ===
Also known as Nowell Sing We Clear, Vol. 4

1. "The Boys' Carol"
2. "The Cherry Tree Carol"
3. "Carol (While Shepherds Watched)"
4. "Come and I Will Sing You"
5. "Hunting the Wren/The Wren Boys' Song"
6. "Over the Hill and Over the Dale"
7. "Old Christmas/Shooting Recitation"
8. "The Ram Song"
9. "Welladay (Christmas Lamentation)"
10. "Boar's Head Carol"
11. "The Praise of Christmas"
12. "The Rag Dance Song (La GuignolŽe)/Pays D'Haut"
13. "Rolling Downward"

=== The Best of Nowell Sing We Clear 1975–1986 (1989) ===
Also known as The Best of… Sing We Clear. Songs are taken from Nowell Sing We Clear, The Second Nowell, and Nowell Sing We Clear, Vol. 3; which are no longer available separately.

1. "A Child This Day Is Born"
2. "While Shepherds Watched"
3. "Leaping and Dancing"
4. "The Cherry Tree Carol"
5. "Sussex Carol"
6. "The Carnal and the Crane"/"King Herod and the Cock"/"The Miraculous Harvest"
7. "Coventry Carol"
8. "The Bitter Withy"
9. "The Holly and the Ivy"
10. "Green Grow'th the Holly"
11. "Winter/Spring"
12. "Rise Up Jock" (Bob Pegg)
13. "Gower Wassail"
14. "Gloucestershire Wassail"
15. "Apple Tree Wassail"/"The Derby Ram"
16. "Sherburne" ("Original" Version)
17. "Kris Kringle"
18. "The Cutty Wren"
19. "An Orkney New Year's Carol"
20. "Carol for New Year's Day"
21. "The Wren" (The King)
22. "Lord of the Dance" (Sydney Carter)

=== Hail Smiling Morn! (1995) ===
1. "Hail Smiling Morn"
2. "Sweet Chiming Bells"
3. "Old Foster"
4. "The Holly and the Ivy"
5. "Shepherds Arise"
6. "Old Christmas Return'd"
7. "Jacob's Well"
8. "March of the Kings"
9. "I Saw Three Ships"
10. "The Joys of Mary"
11. "The Bitter Withy"
12. "Carol of the Creatures"
13. "Hail Happy Morn"
14. "The Cutty Wren"
15. "Here We Come A-Wassailing/We Wish You a Merry Christmas"
16. "Carol for the New Year"

=== Just Say Nowell (2000) ===
1. "The Truth from Above"
2. "Babe of Bethlehem"
3. "The First Nowell"
4. "The Cherry Tree Carol"
5. "London"
6. "The Blessings of Mary"
7. "I Saw a Maiden"
8. "Chariots"
9. "The Holly and the Ivy"
10. "Joy to the World"
11. "Christemas Hath Made an End"
12. "Ditchling Carol"
13. "Time to Remember the Poor"
14. "Stevens Family Waysail"
15. "Sound, Sound Your Instruments of Joy"
16. "New Year's Carol"

=== Nowell Nowell Nowell! (2008) ===
All songs in the public domain, except as noted.

1. "Carol for Christmas Eve" - 2:22
2. "From Far Away" - 3:57
3. "The Twelve Days of Christmas" - 3:58
4. "Six Jolly Miners" - 2:31
5. "Sherburne/Milford" - 2:20
6. "I Heard from Heaven Today" - 4:38
7. "The Shepherds Amazèd" - 3:07
8. "Derwent Wassail" - 3:55
9. "Joys Seven" - 2:37
10. "Somerset Wassail" - 3:39
11. "The Derby Ram" - 4:46
12. "Beautiful Star of Bethlehem" - 3:02
13. "Homeless Wassail" (Ian Robb)- 4:44
14. "Bring the New Year In" - 3:57
15. "Green Grow the Rushes-O" - 5:23
16. "Song for the New Year" (Robb)- 5:02

=== Bidding You Joy! (2013) ===
All songs in the public domain, except as noted.

1. "Bidding You Joy" (Alison Burns)– 1:08
2. "Masters in This Hall" (William Morris) – 4:30
3. "Awake! Behold!" – 4:10
4. "The Old Hark Hark" – 2:46
5. "I Saw a Ship" (Addington, A. Burns) – 3:23
6. "Cold December" – 4:05
7. "Mummers Night in Oshawa" (A. Frank Willis)– 4:08
8. "Apple Tree Wassail" – 3:16
9. "New Zadoc (While Shepherds Watched)" – 3:39
10. "O the Holy Holly" – 4:52
11. "O Bethlehem" – 3:21
12. "The Worcestershire Carol" – 3:21
13. "Penny for the Ploughboys" (Colin Cater) – 4:51
14. "Stay and I'll Sing!" – 4:24
15. "The Derby Ram Goes to Sea" – 3:44
16. "The Door of the Year" (A. Burns) – 3:07
17. "Villagers All" (Andy Davis) – 3:19

=== As performers in an anthology ===
1. A Christmas Celtic Sojourn – Rounder Records (2001)
2. Comfort & Joy: A Christmas Celtic Sojourn – (2003)
