= Puck of Pook's Hill =

1906 book by Rudyard Kipling

First American edition, 1906

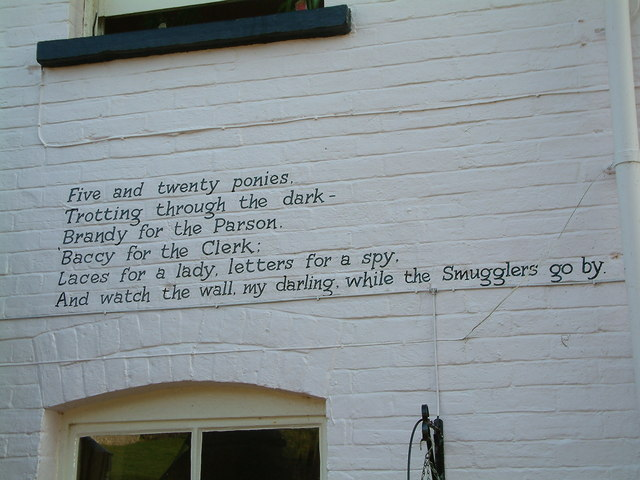
Quotation from A Smuggler's Song on an inn in Dorset, with "Smugglers" replacing "Gentlemen".

Puck of Pook's Hill is a fantasy book by Rudyard Kipling, published in 1906, containing a series of short stories set in different periods of English history. It can count both as historical fantasy – since some of the stories told of the past have clear magical elements, and as contemporary fantasy – since it depicts a magical being active and practising his magic in the England of the early 1900s when the book was written.

The stories are all narrated to two children living near Burwash, in the High Weald of Sussex, in the area of Kipling's own house Bateman's, by people magically plucked out of history by the elf Puck, or told by Puck himself. (Puck, who refers to himself as "the oldest Old Thing in England", is better known as a character in William Shakespeare's play A Midsummer Night's Dream.) The genres of particular stories range from authentic historical novella (A Centurion of the Thirtieth, On the Great Wall) to children's fantasy (Dymchurch Flit). Each story is bracketed by a poem which relates in some manner to the theme or subject of the story.

Donald Mackenzie, who wrote the introduction for the Oxford World's Classics edition of Puck of Pook's Hill in 1987, has described this book as an example of archaeological imagination that, in fragments, delivers a look at the history of England, climaxing with the signing of Magna Carta.

Puck calmly concludes the series of stories: "Weland gave the Sword, The Sword gave the Treasure, and the Treasure gave the Law. It's as natural as an oak growing."

The stories originally appeared in the Strand Magazine in 1906 with illustrations by Claude Allin Shepperson, but the first book-form edition was illustrated by H. R. Millar. Arthur Rackham provided four colour plates for the first US edition. Puck of Pook's Hill was followed four years later by a second volume, Rewards and Fairies, featuring the same children in the following summer.

T. S. Eliot included several of the poems in his 1941 collection A Choice of Kipling's Verse.

== Reception ==
Marcus Crouch in Treasure Seekers and Borrowers, describes Puck of Pook's Hill and Rewards and Fairies as the most passionate of Kipling's books, saying that he put into them "everything that meant the most to him" and in consequence "forgot the tiresome stylistic tricks which disfigured some of his works". Crouch links the central concept with Kipling's experience in India and his exposure to the ideas of reincarnation and the oneness of past and present. Settled in an ancient house in Sussex, he was "surrounded by evidences of the past, not only in monuments of earth and stone, but in the speech and customs of country folk". The books cast in story form his understanding of the continuity of history.

== Stories and poems ==
Stories and poems
Section	Pages (Note: Page numbers here only give relative position within a Gutenburg edition)	Title	Description
Weland's Sword	4–5	Puck's Song	A poem which introduces some of the themes of the stories that follow.
Weland's Sword	5–14	Weland's Sword	A story of Burwash in the 11th century just before the Norman Conquest, told by Puck himself.
Weland's Sword	14	A Tree Song	A poem about English trees, emphasising the symbolic nature of Oak, Ash and Thorn. The poem is used as the lyrics for the song "Oak, Ash and Thorn", set to music by Peter Bellamy and subsequently covered by other folk musicians including Tony Barrand, John Roberts, and The Longest Johns.
Young Men at the Manor	15–23	Young Men at the Manor	A story that continues the previous one just after the Norman Conquest. It is told by Sir Richard Dalyngridge, a Norman knight who took part in the Conquest and was awarded a Saxon manor.
Young Men at the Manor	24	Sir Richard's Song	The poem of Sir Richard Dalyngridge and how he adapted to living in England despite his Norman origins.
The Knights of the Joyous Venture	24	Harp Song of the Dane Women	A lament by the Danish women for their menfolk who leave to go on a viking on the grey sea.
The Knights of the Joyous Venture	25–35	The Knights of the Joyous Venture	The story of a daring voyage to Africa made by Danes after they captured Sir Richard and his Saxon friend Hugh at sea. This story was adapted by Hal Foster as an episode of Prince Valiant in 1942.
The Knights of the Joyous Venture	35	Thorkild's Song	A song by a Danish seafarer hoping for wind.
Old Men at Pevensey	35–47	Old Men at Pevensey	A tale of intrigue set in Pevensey at the beginning of the reign of Henry I in 1100. Kipling implies that Henry created "England", an entity which dominates Kipling's national and imperial philosophy, by abandoning claims to his estates in Normandy.
Old Men at Pevensey	47	The Runes on Weland's Sword	A poem that summarises the stories in the book to this point.
A Centurion of the Thirtieth	47–48	'Cities and Thrones and Powers'	A poem that comments on how "cities, thrones and powers" are as transitory as flowers that bloom for a week.
A Centurion of the Thirtieth	48–56	A Centurion of the Thirtieth	A story that introduces a new narrator, a Roman soldier named Parnesius, born and stationed in Britain in the 4th century. He tells how his military career started well because the general Magnus Maximus knew his father.
A Centurion of the Thirtieth	56–57	A British-Roman Song	The song of a Roman Briton serving Rome although he and his forebears have never seen the city.
On the Great Wall	57–66	On the Great Wall	A story of the defence of Hadrian's Wall against the native Picts and Scandinavian raiders.
On the Great Wall	66	A Song to Mithras	A hymn to the god Mithras.
The Winged Hats	66–75	The Winged Hats	A return to Hadrian's Wall and the fate of Magnus Maximus.
The Winged Hats	75–76	A Pict Song	The song of the Picts, explaining how, although they have always been defeated by the Romans, they will win in the end. Billy Bragg included a musical setting of this poem on his 1996 album William Bloke.
Hal o' the Draft	76	'Prophets have honour all over the Earth'	A poem about how prophets are never acknowledged or celebrated in their native village.
Hal o' the Draft	76–84	Hal o' the Draft	A tale of deception told by Sir Harry "Hal" Dawe, involving the explorer Sebastian Cabot and the privateer Andrew Barton near the end of the 15th century.
Hal o' the Draft	84	A Smuggler's Song	Sung by a smuggler advising people to look the other way when contraband is being run through the town. The mention of "King George" places the supposed date of the poem between the years 1714 and 1830, and perhaps more specifically during the Napoleonic Continental System of 1806–1814.
Dymchurch Flit	85	The Bee Boy's Song	A poem that explains how honey bees must be told all the news or else they will cease to produce honey.
Dymchurch Flit	85–92	Dymchurch Flit	A fairy tale told by Puck (in disguise) and set around the time of the dissolution of the monasteries (about 1540).
Dymchurch Flit	92–93	A Three-Part Song	A poem that tells of the three main landscapes of Sussex: the Weald, Romney Marsh and the South Downs.
The Treasure and the Law	93	The Fifth River	How God assigned the four great rivers of the Garden of Eden to men, but Israel was later assigned the secret fifth great river, the River of Gold.
The Treasure and the Law	93–101	The Treasure and the Law	A story of money and intrigue, told by a Jewish moneylender named Kadmiel, leading up to the signing of Magna Carta in 1215. Here we learn the eventual fate of most of the African gold brought back to Pevensey by Sir Richard Dalyngridge.
The Treasure and the Law	101	The Children's Song	A patriotic prayer to God to teach the children how to live correctly so that their land will prosper.

== Original book illustrations ==
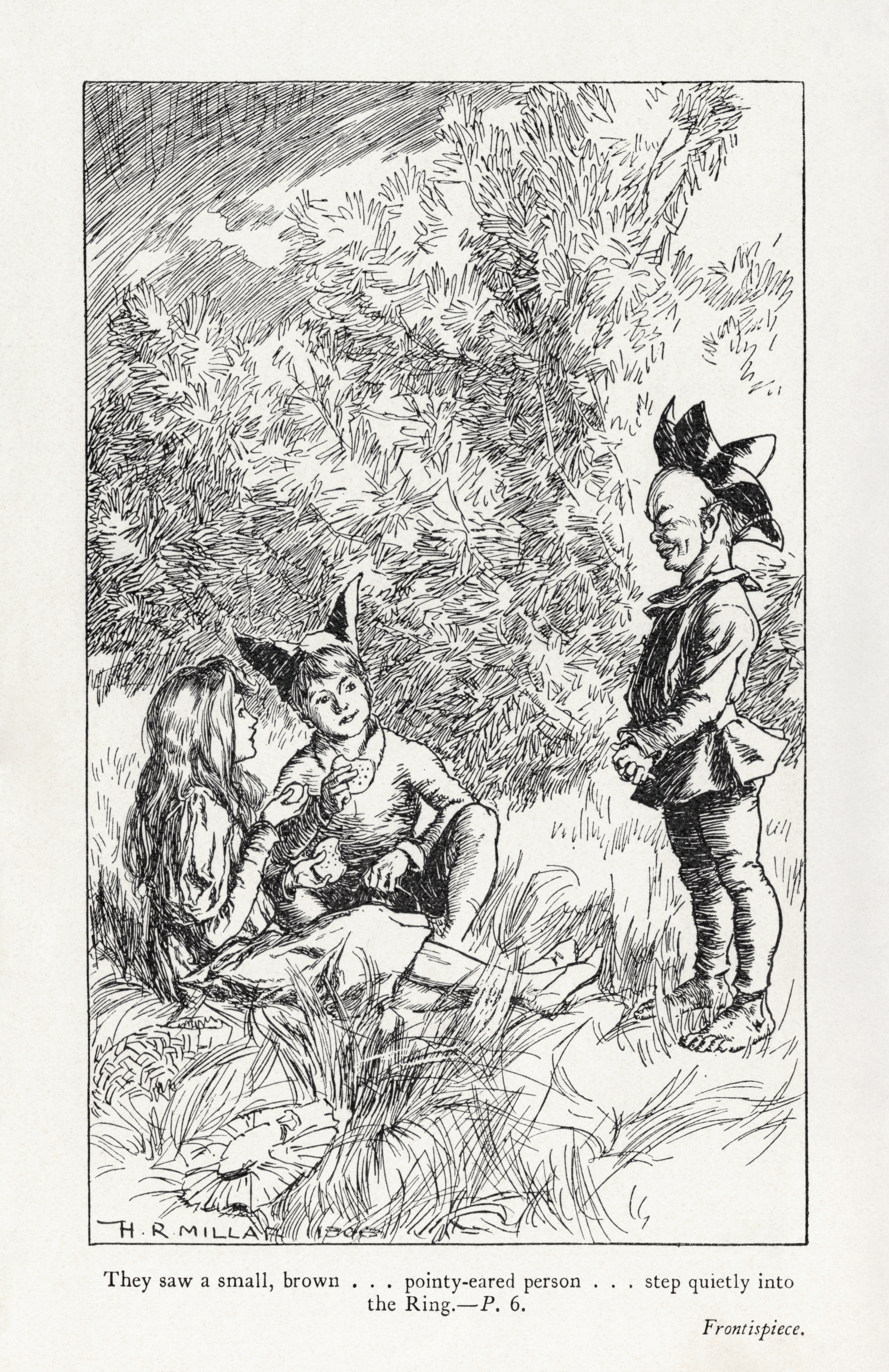
Frontispiece: They saw a small, brown ... pointy-eared person ... step quietly into the Ring

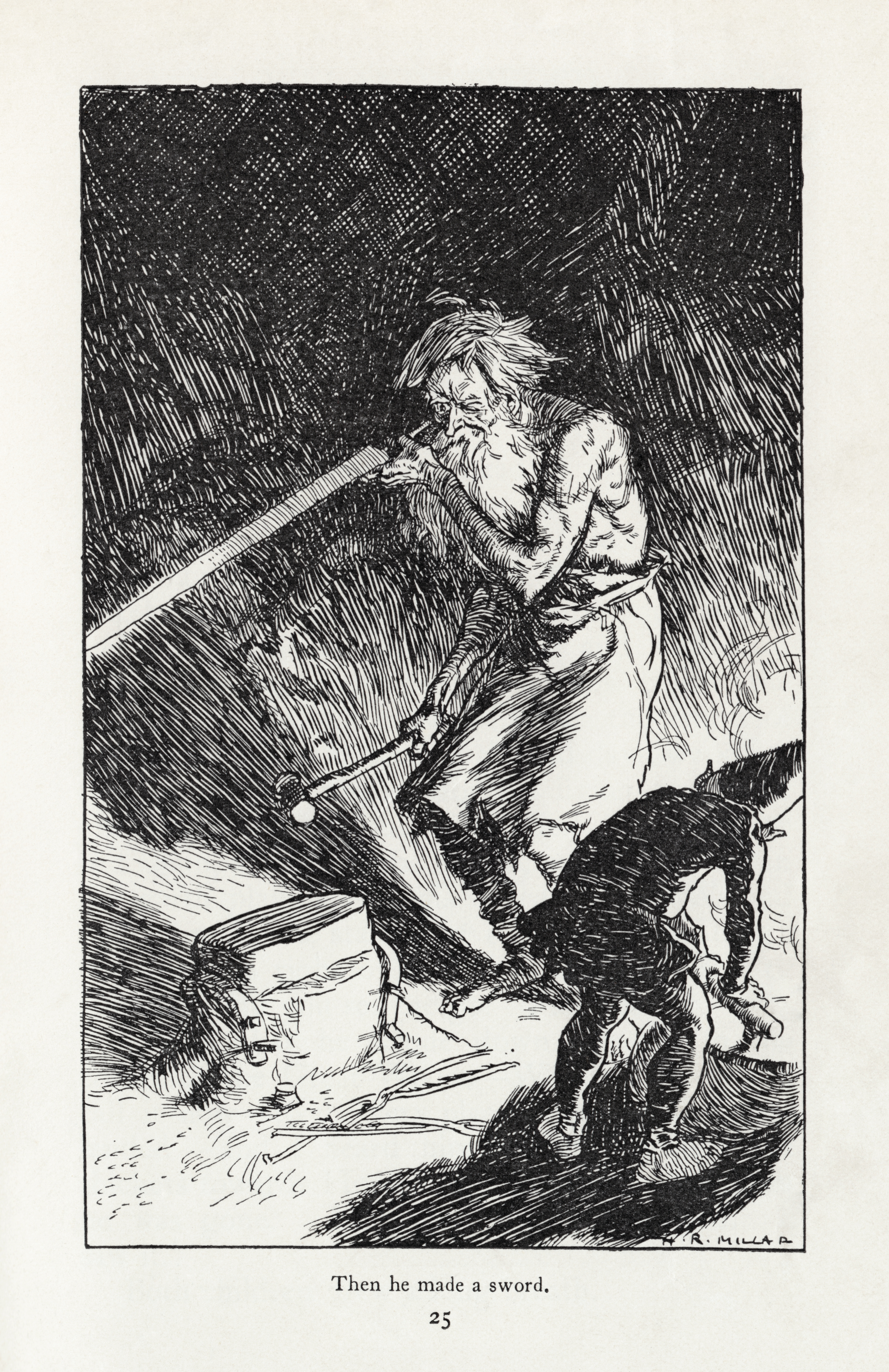
Weland's Sword: Then he made a sword

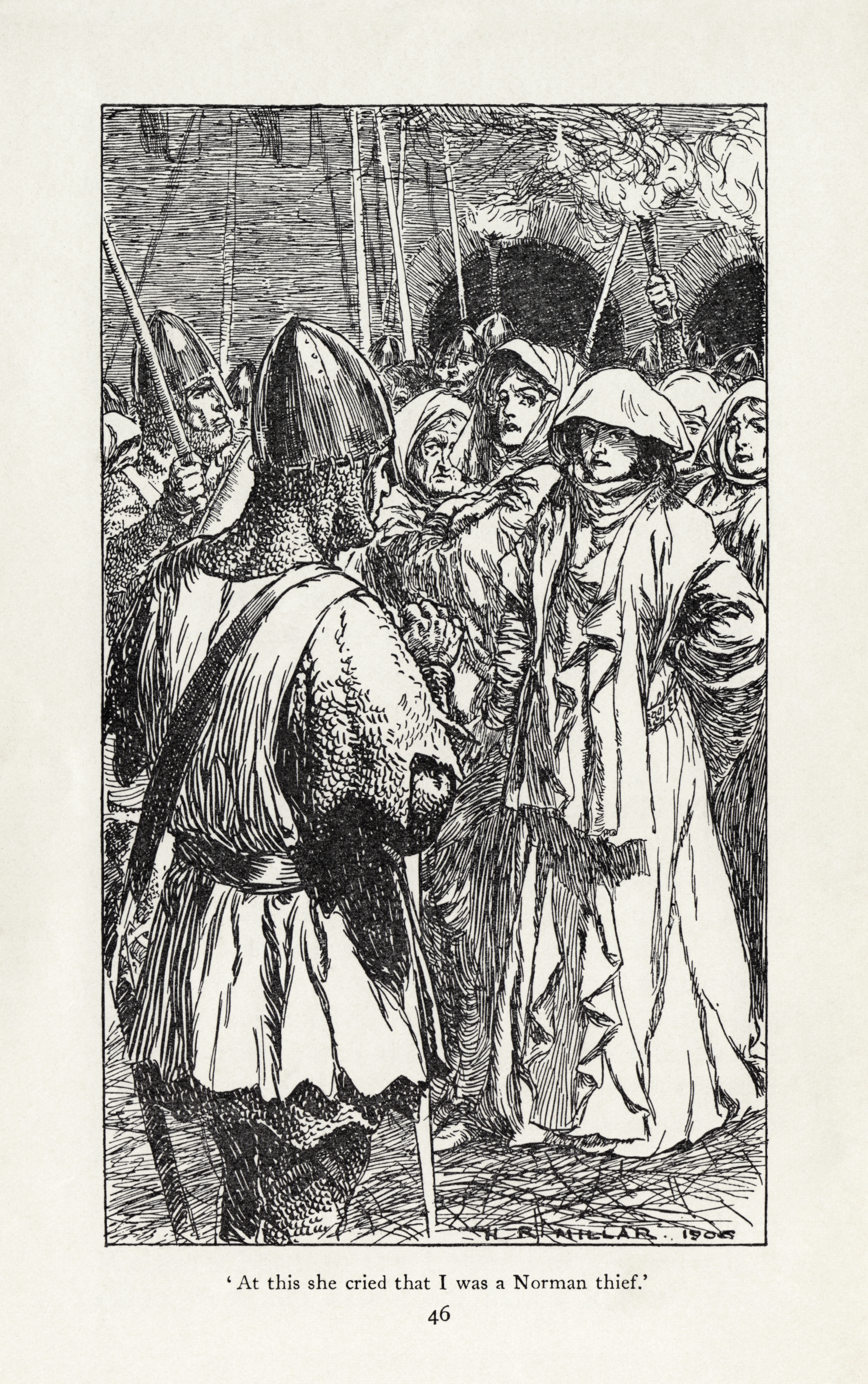
Young Men at the Manor: 'At this she cried that I was a Norman thief'

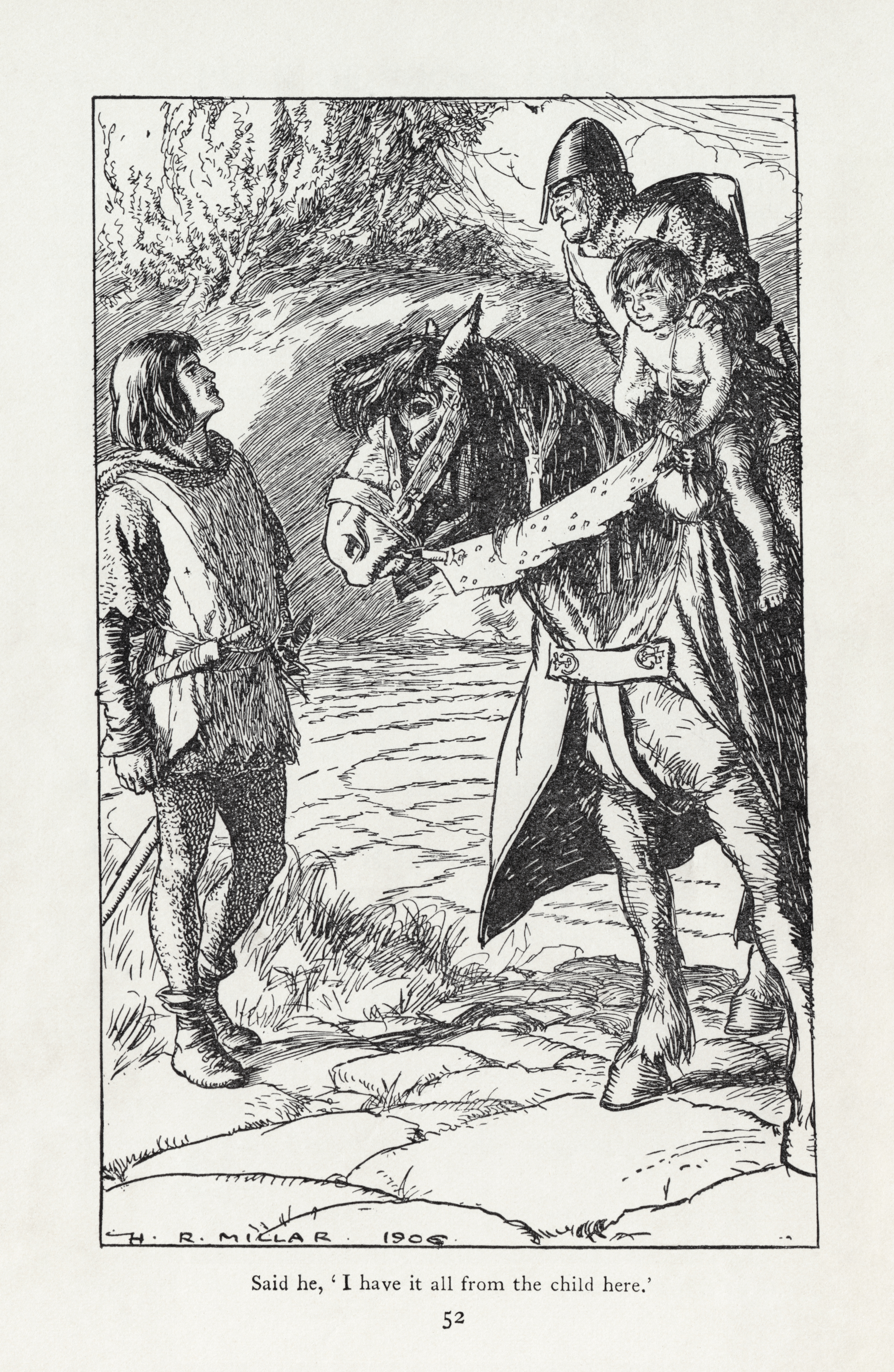
Young Men at the Manor: Said he, 'I have it all from the child here'

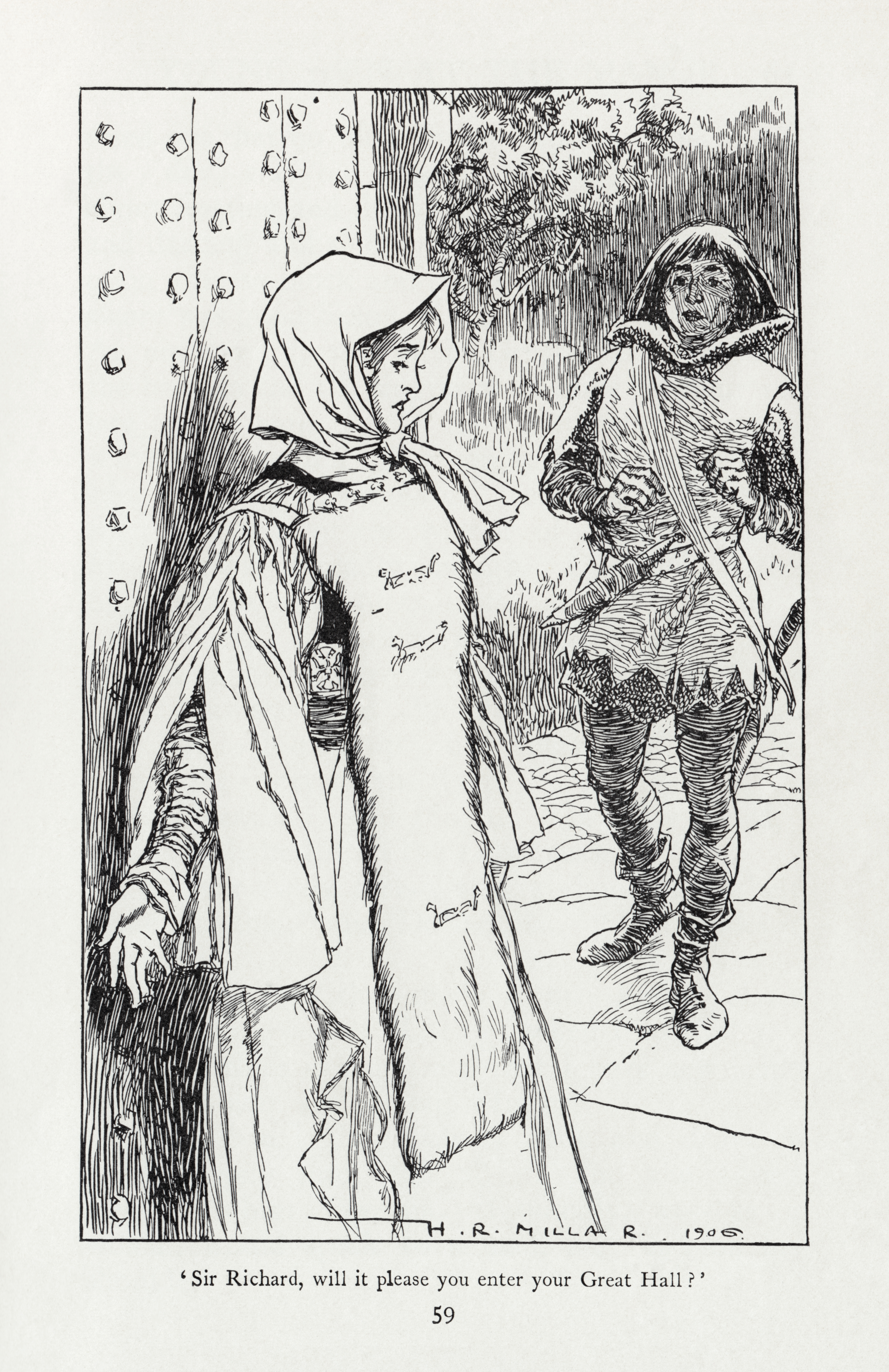
Young Men at the Manor: 'Sir Richard, will it please you enter your Great Hall?'

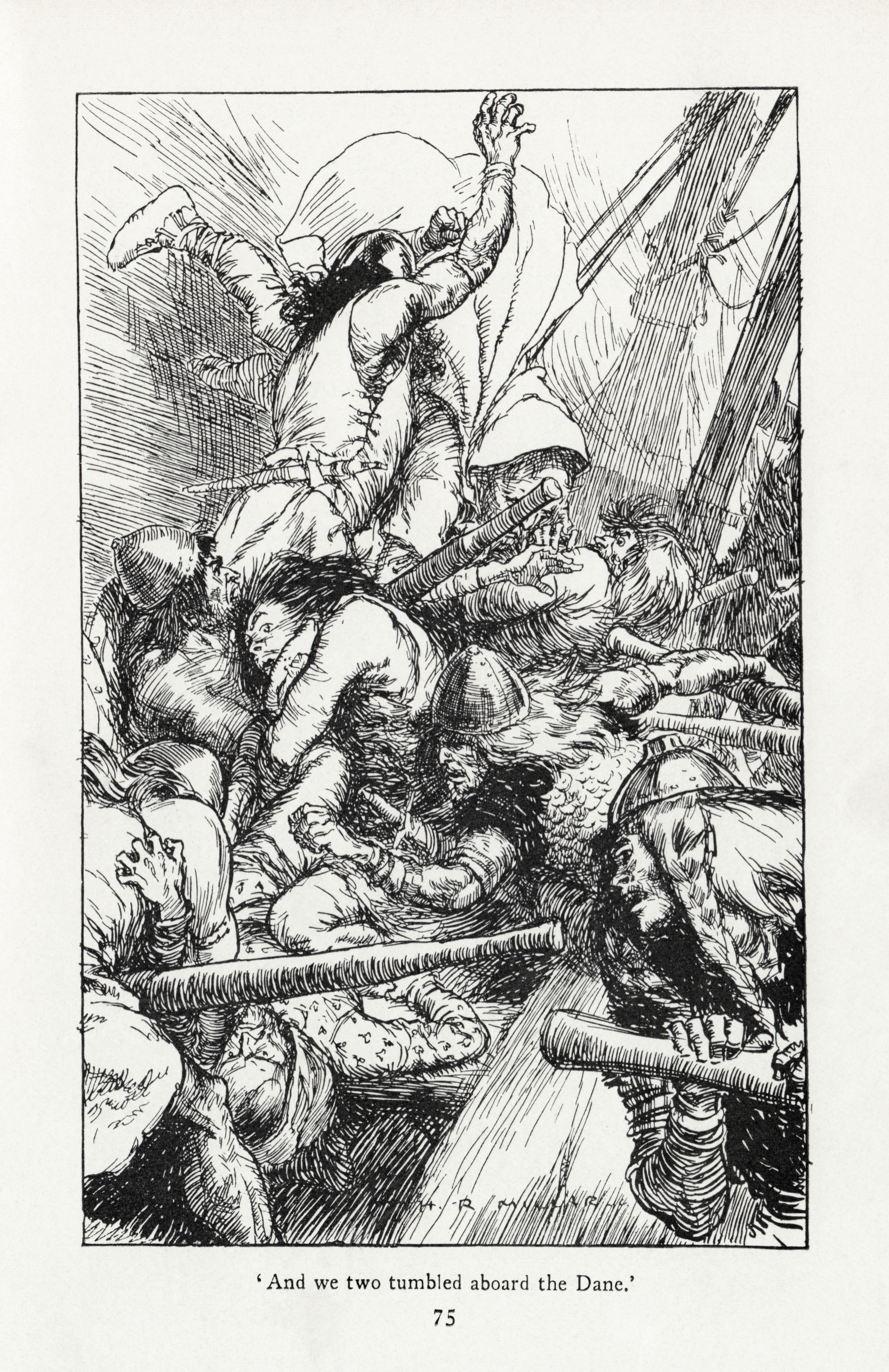
The Knights of the Joyous Venture: 'And we two tumbled aboard the Dane'

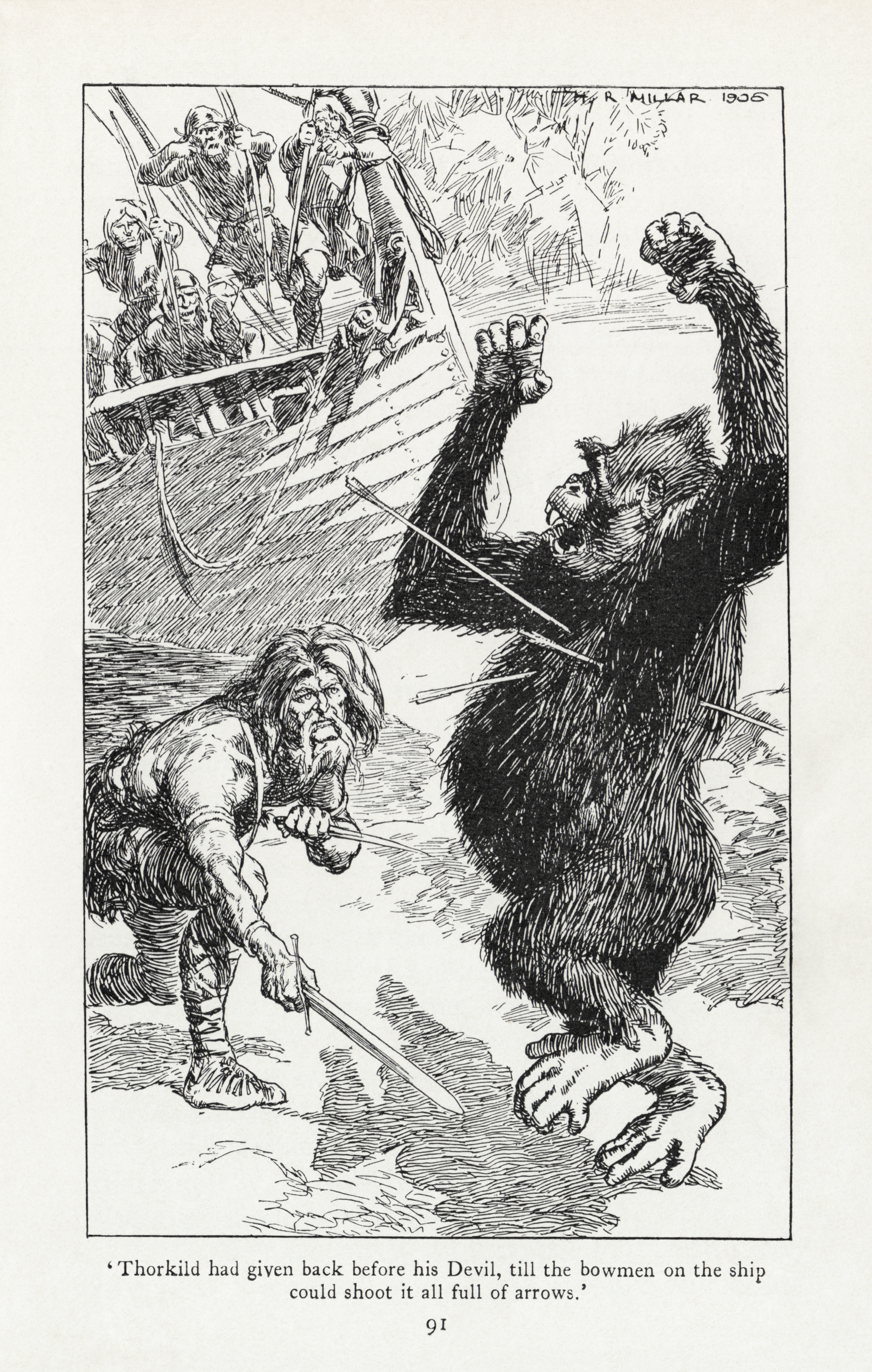
The Knights of the Joyous Venture: Thorkild had given back before his Devil, till the bowmen on the ship could shoot it all full of arrows

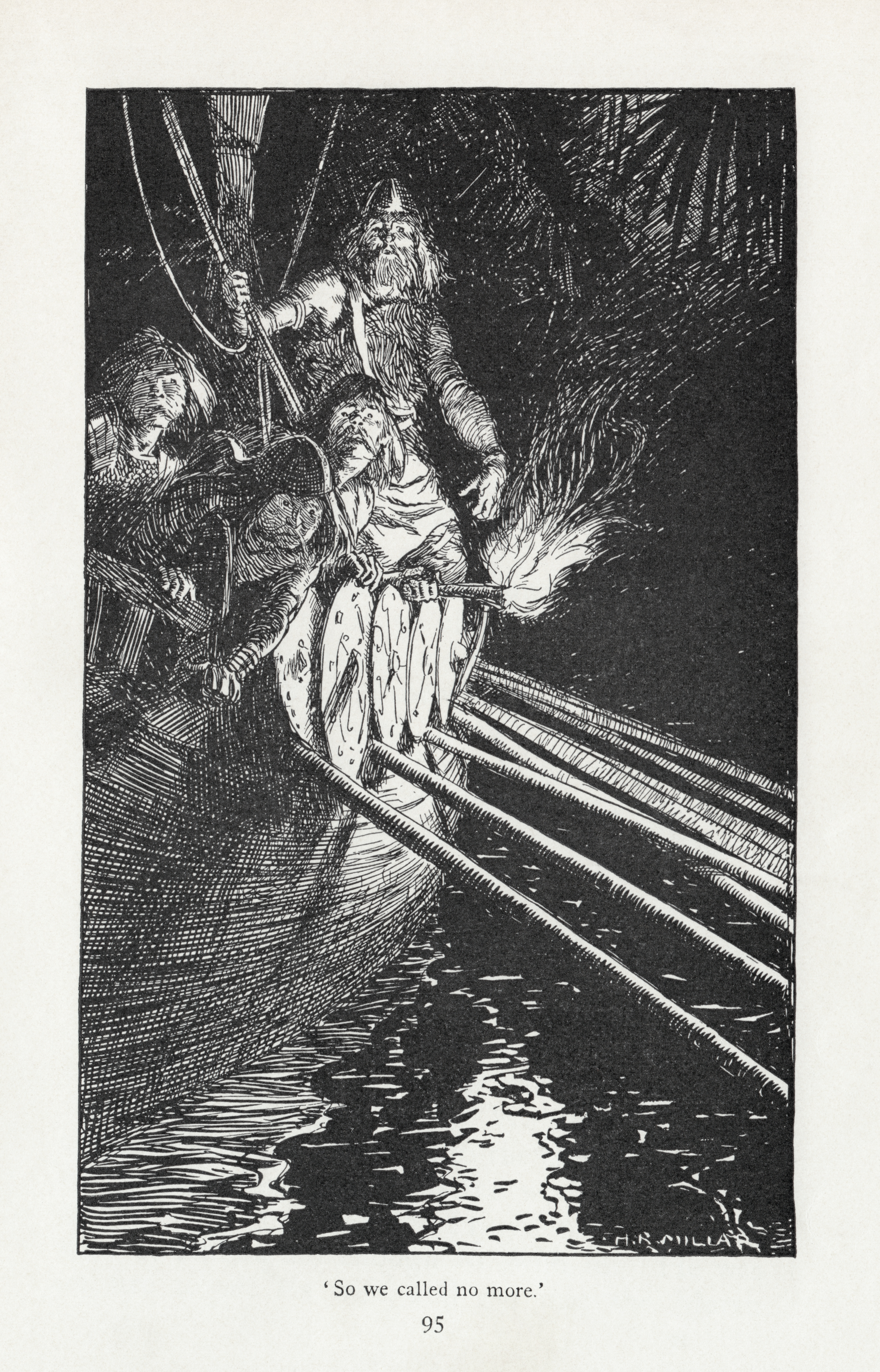
The Knights of the Joyous Venture: 'So we called no more'

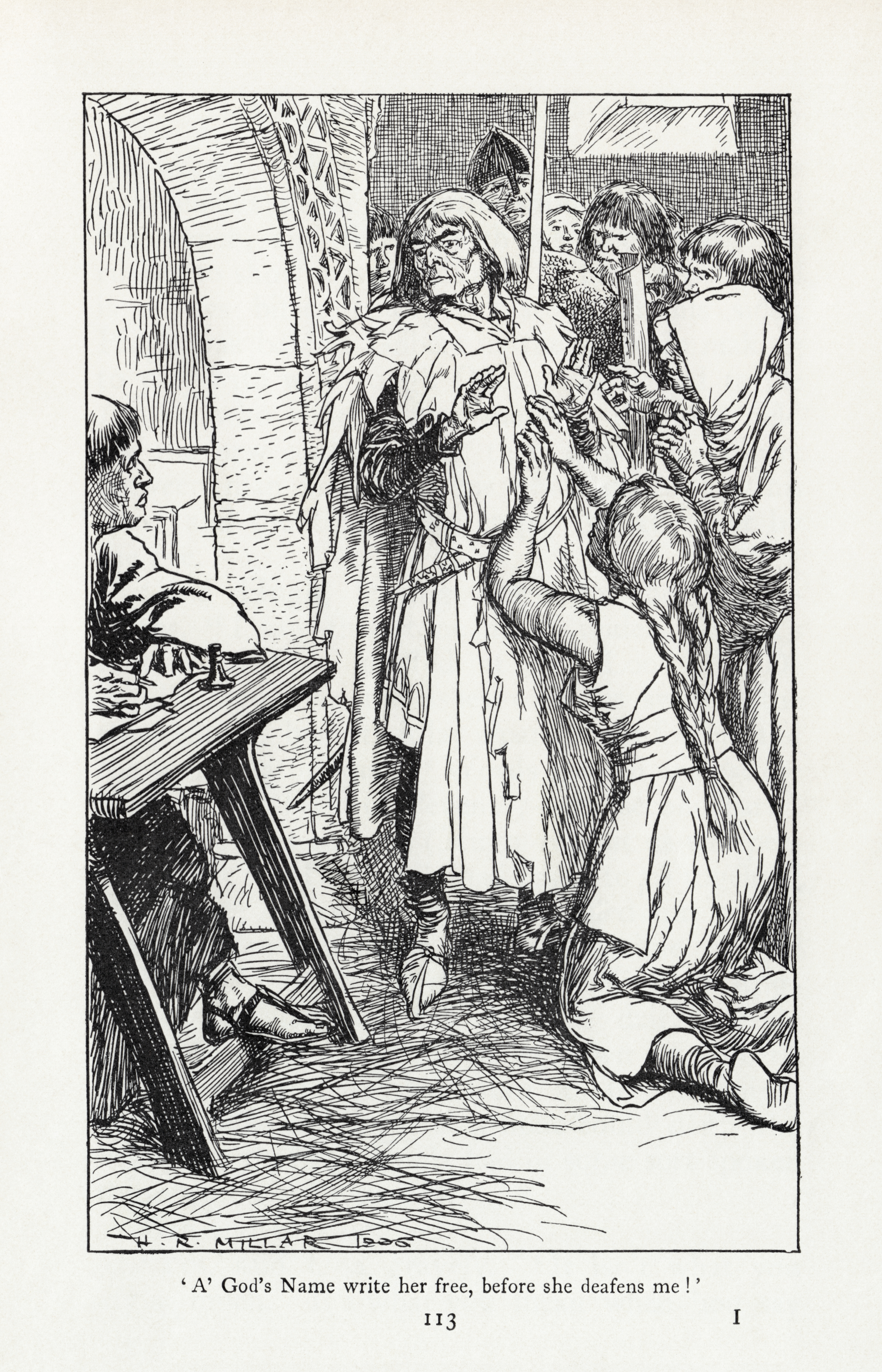
Old Men at Pevensey: 'A' God's Name write her free, before she deafens me!'

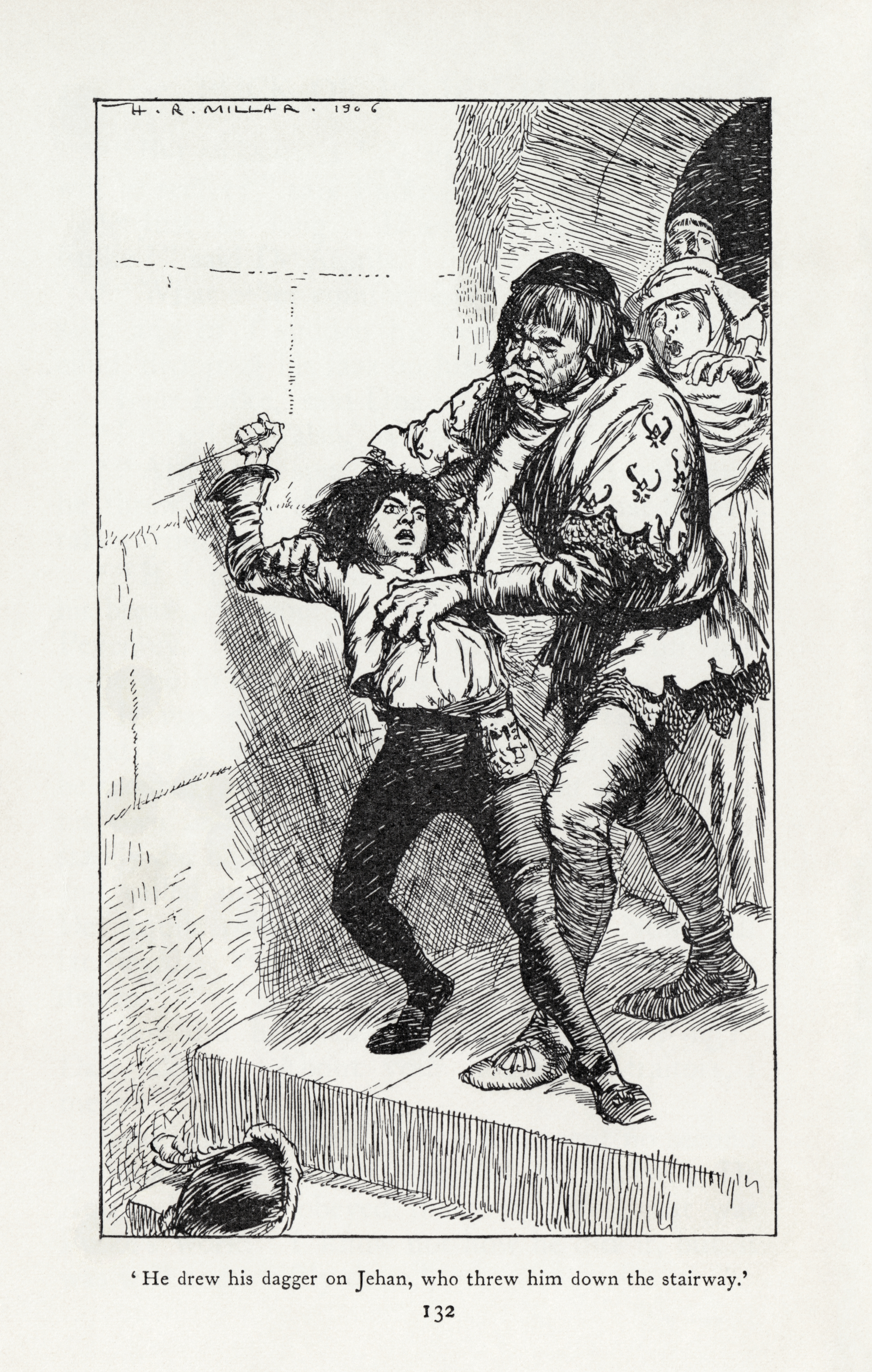
Old Men at Pevensey: He drew his dagger on Jehan, who threw him down the stairway

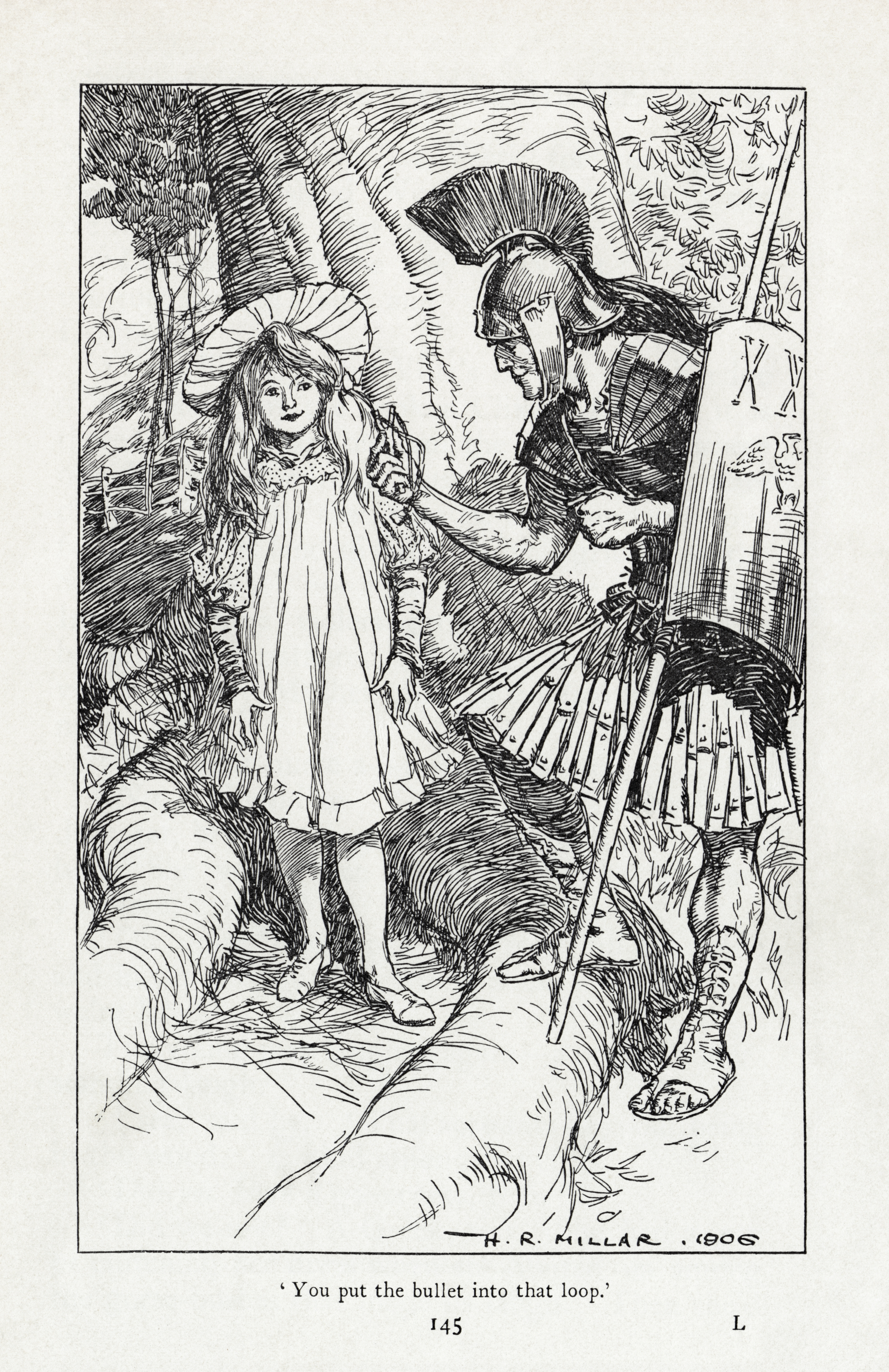
A Centurion of the Thirtieth: 'You put the bullet into that loop'

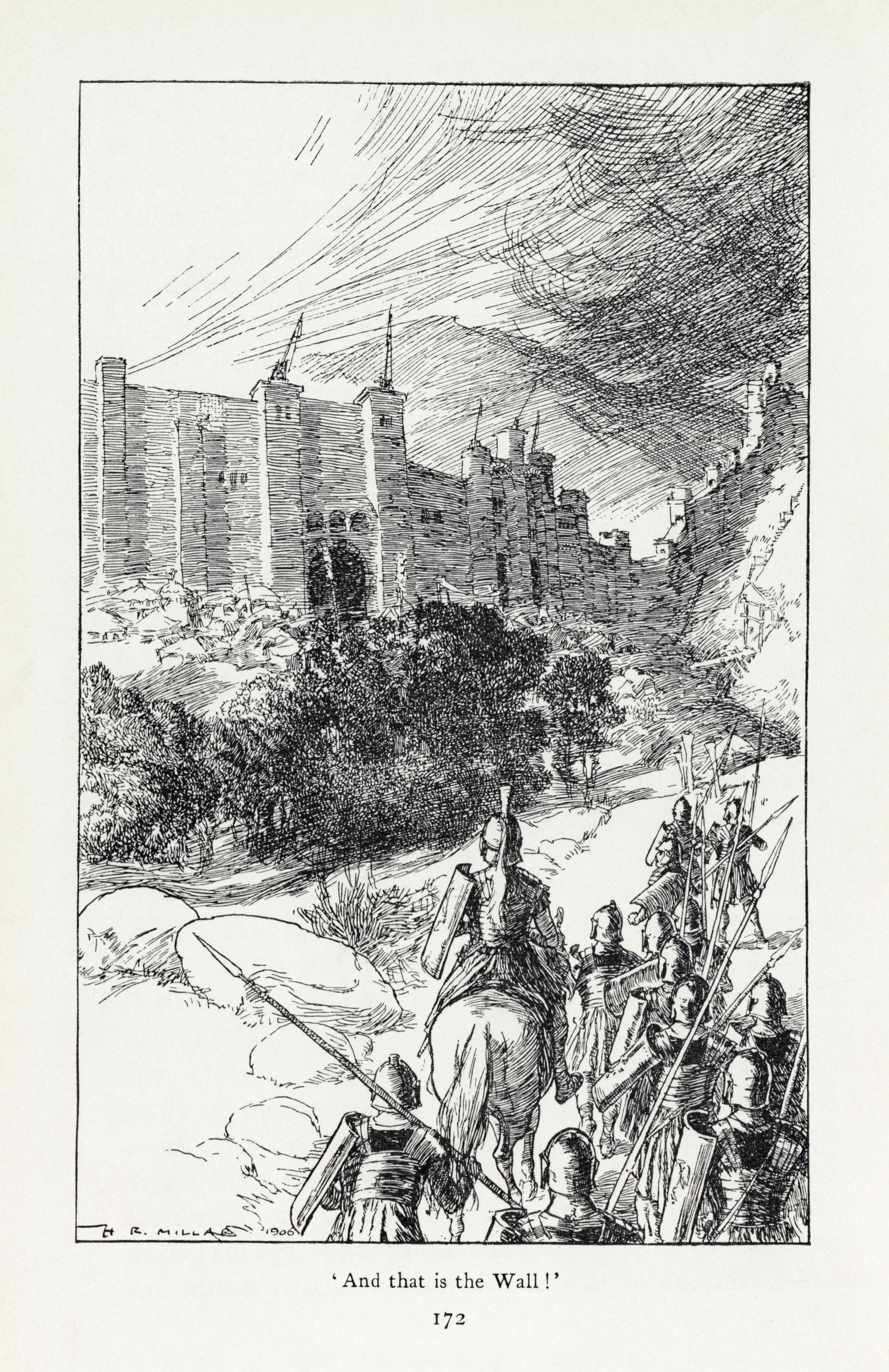
On the Great Wall: 'And that is the Wall!'

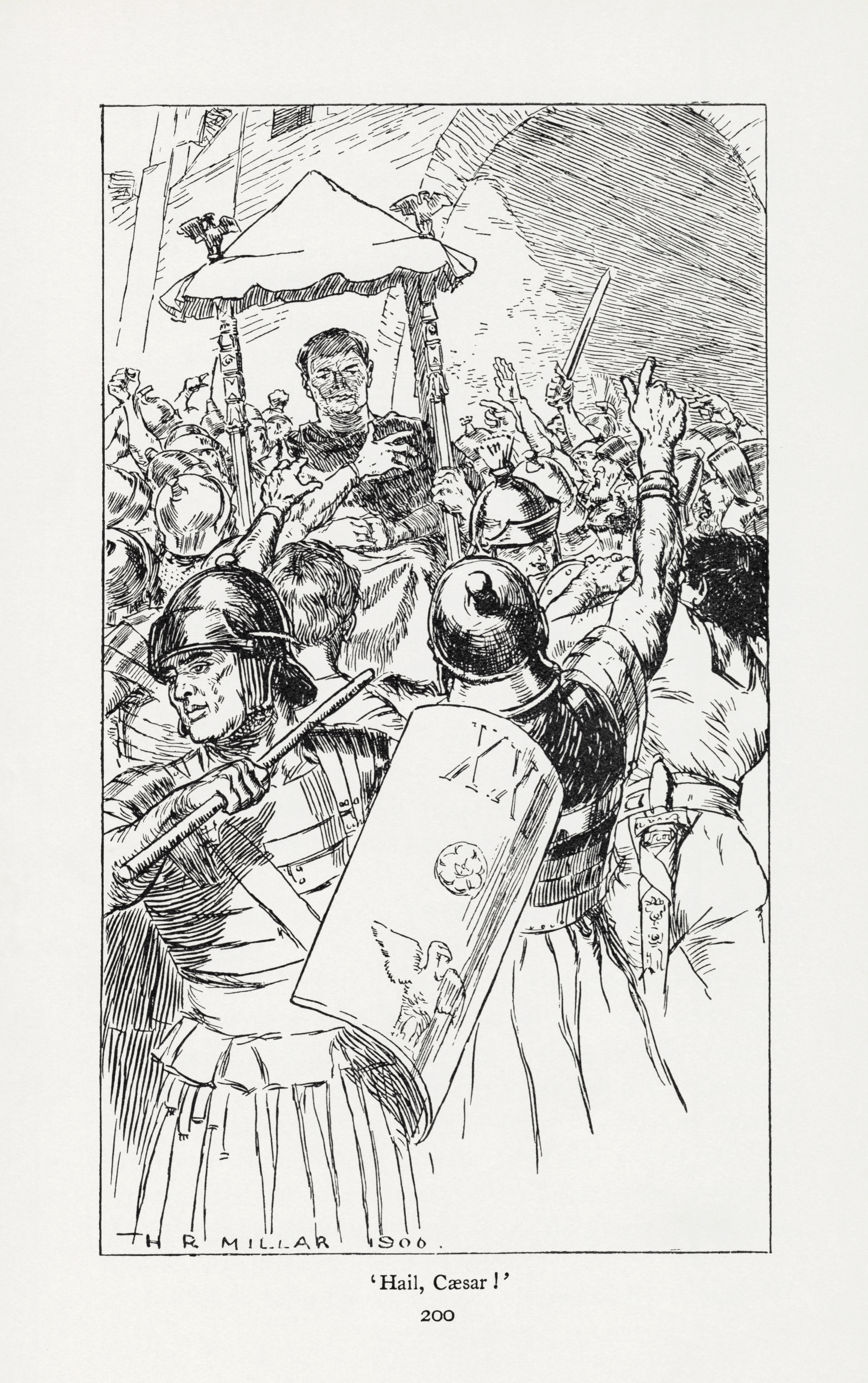
The Winged Hats: 'Hail, Caesar!'

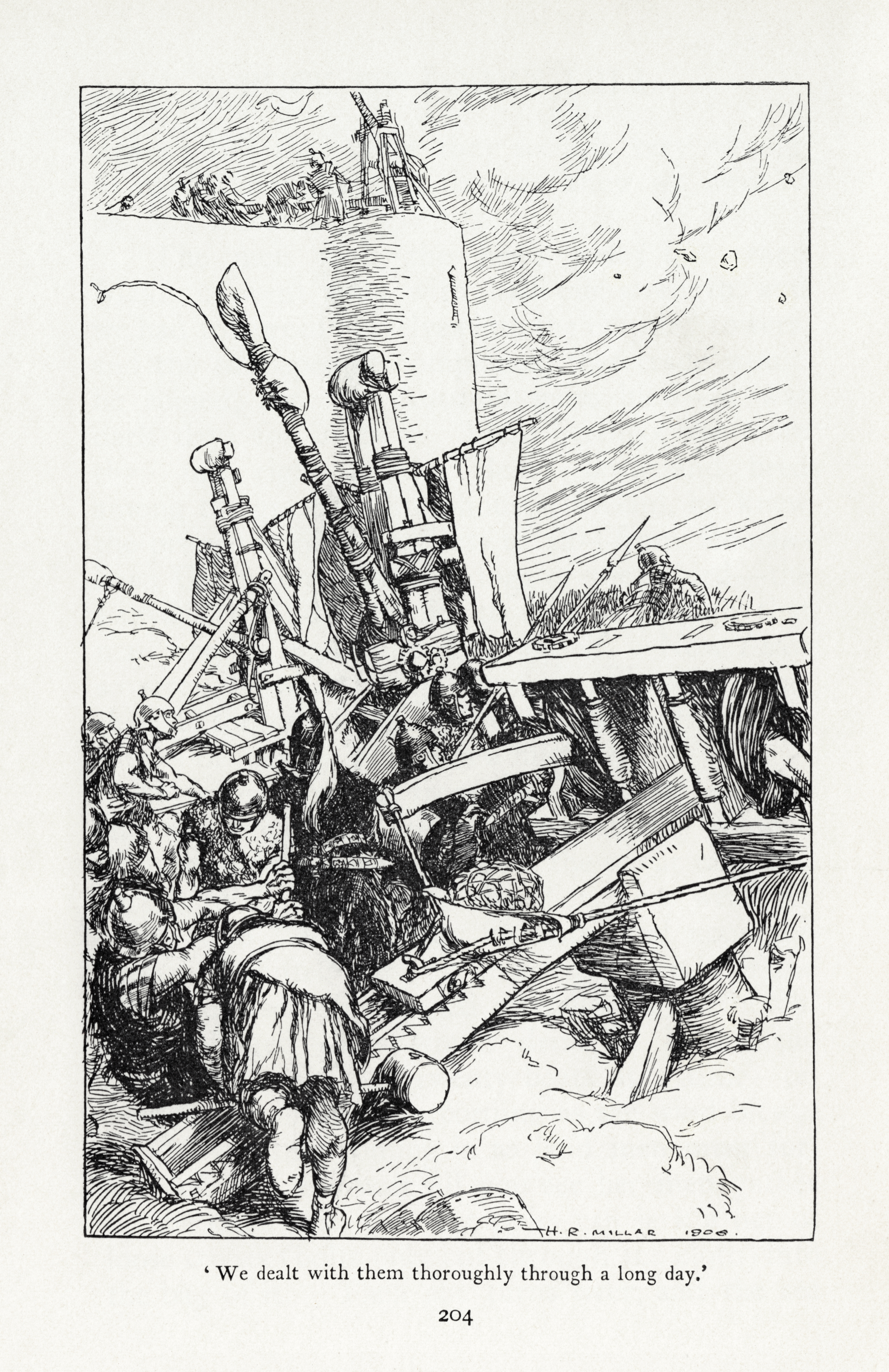
The Winged Hats: 'We dealt with them thoroughly through a long day'

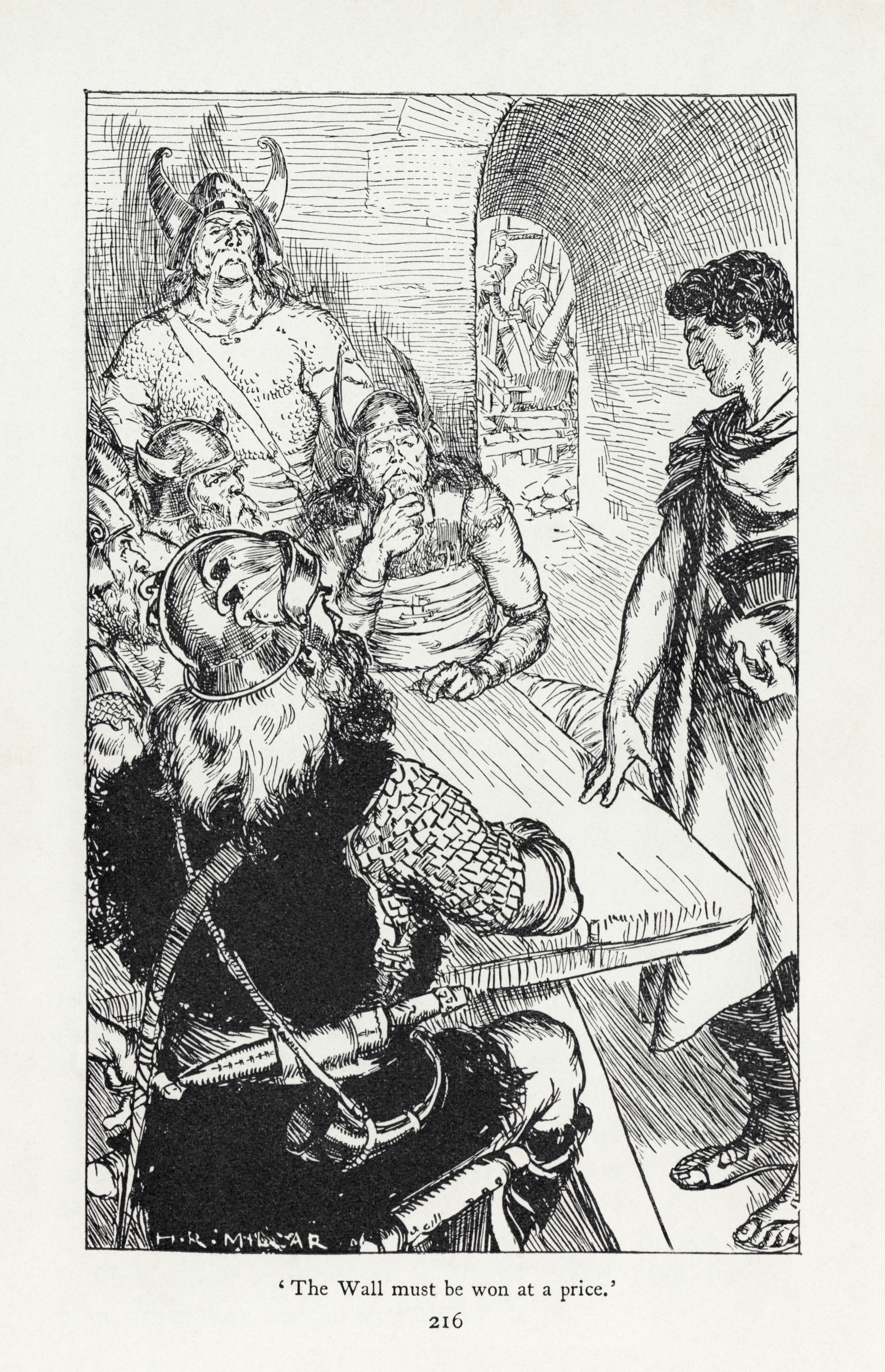
The Winged Hats: 'The Wall must be won at a price'

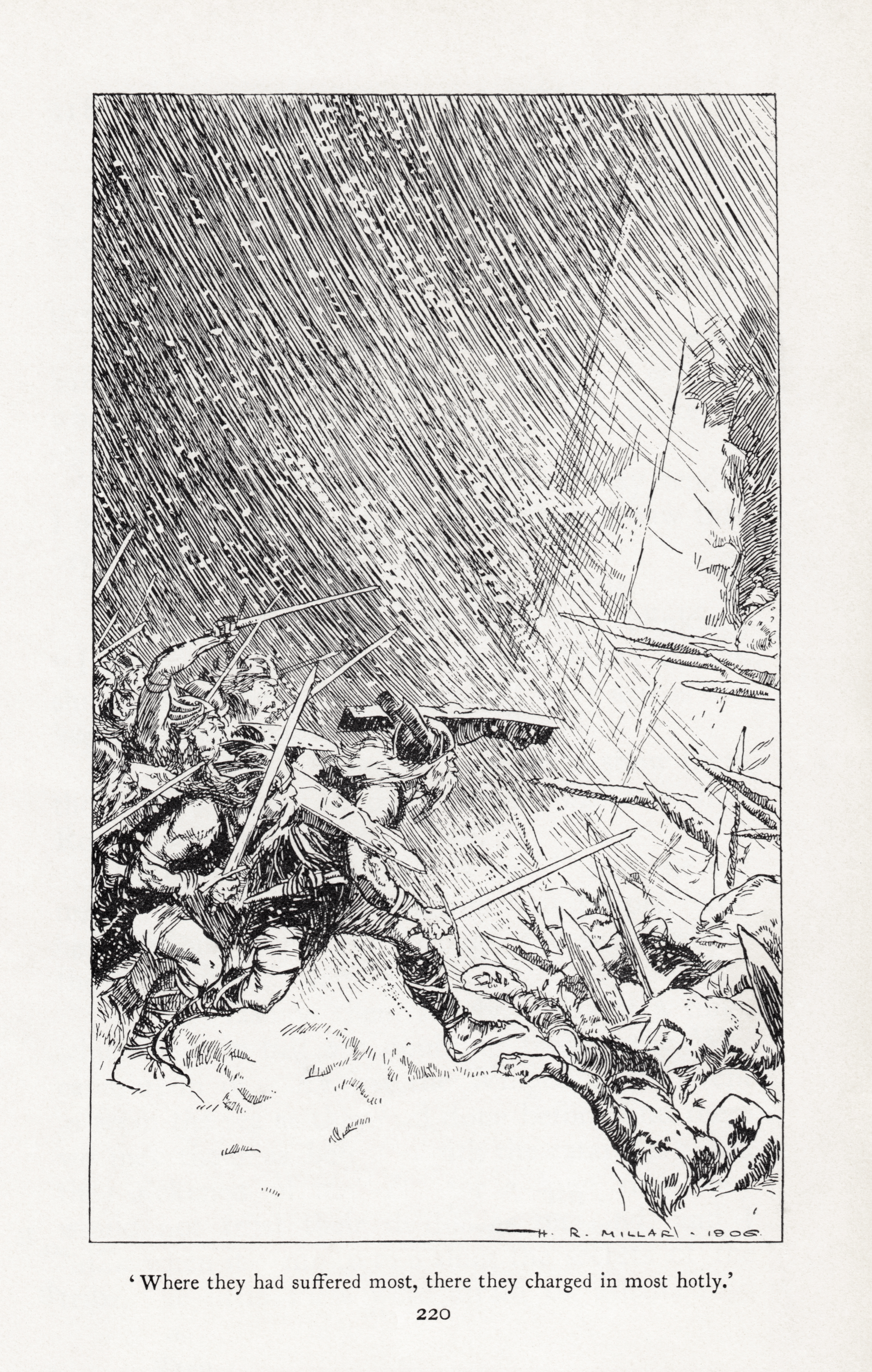
The Winged Hats: Where they had suffered most, there they charged in most hotly

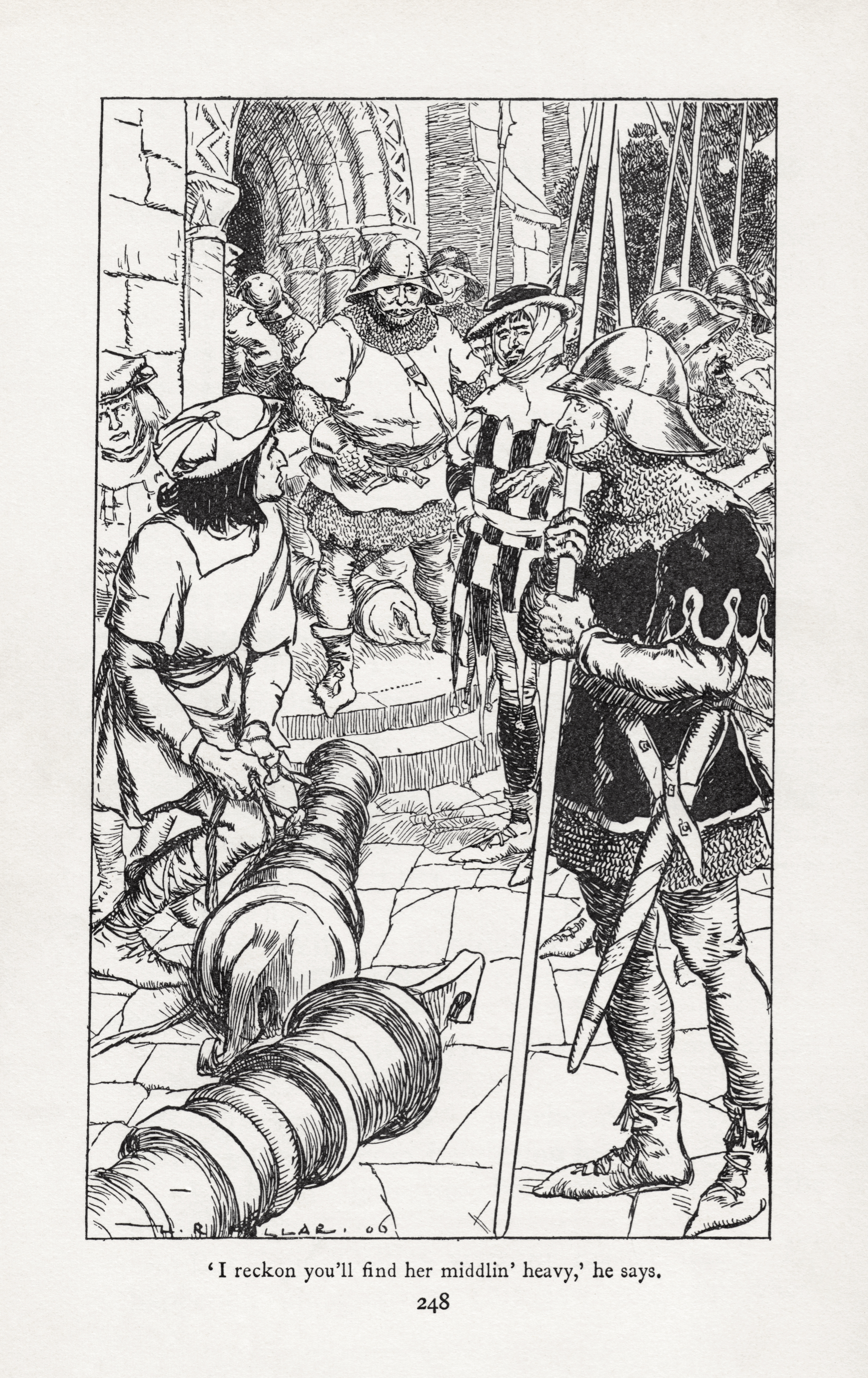
Hal o' the Draft: 'I reckon you'll find her middlin' heavy,' he says

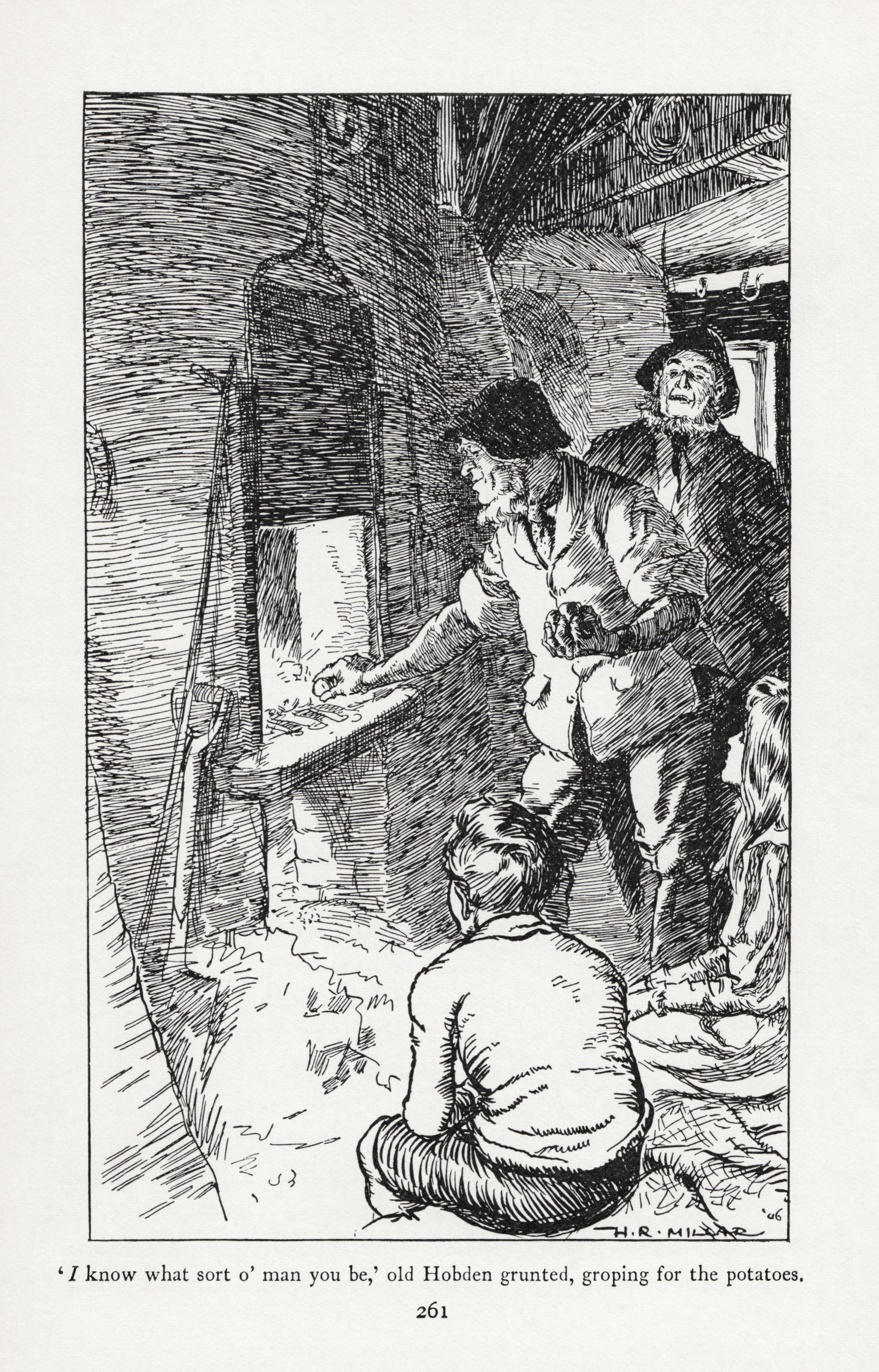
'Dymchurch Flit': 'I know what sort o' man you be,' old Hobden grunted, groping for the potatoes

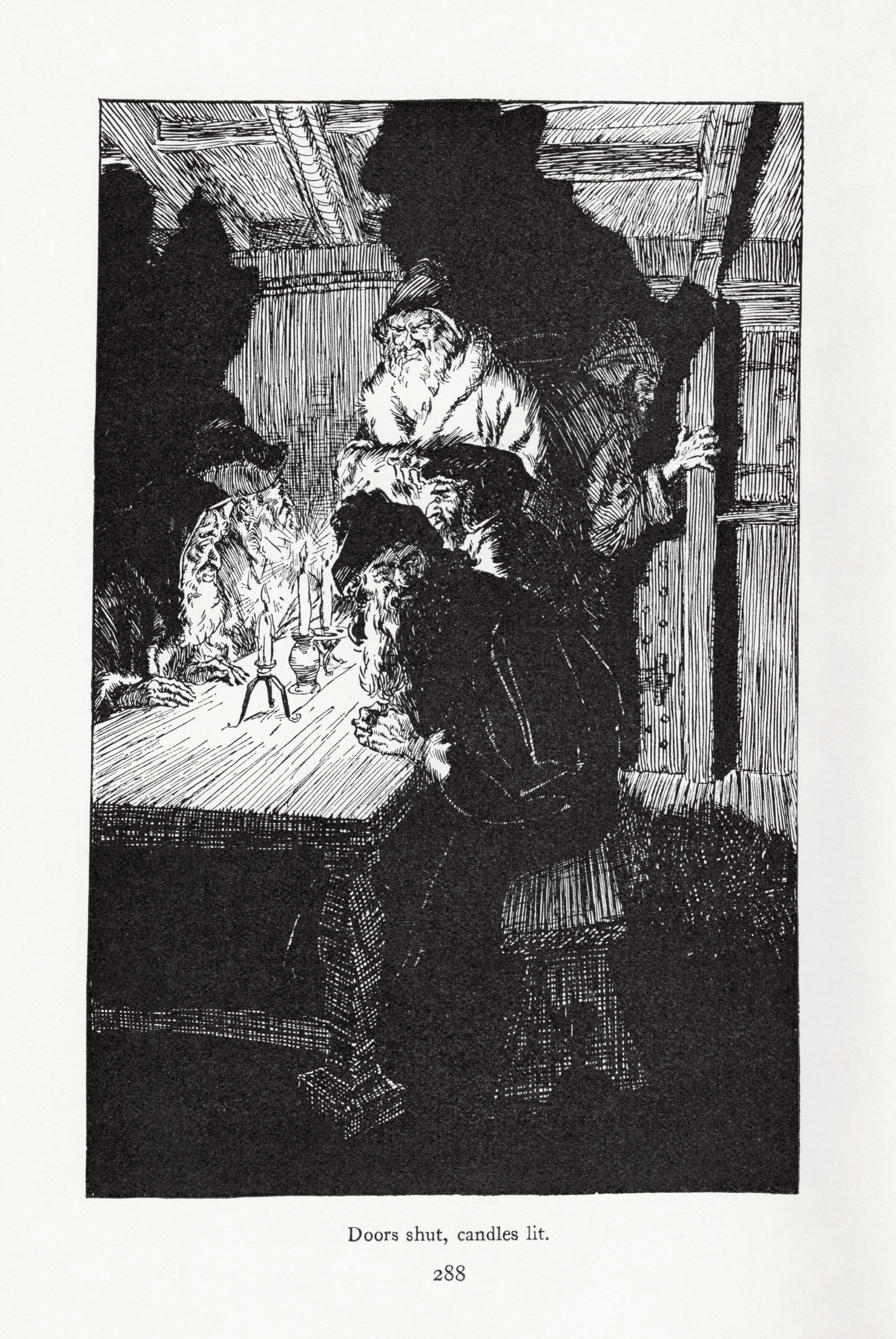
The Treasure and the Law: Doors shut, candles lit

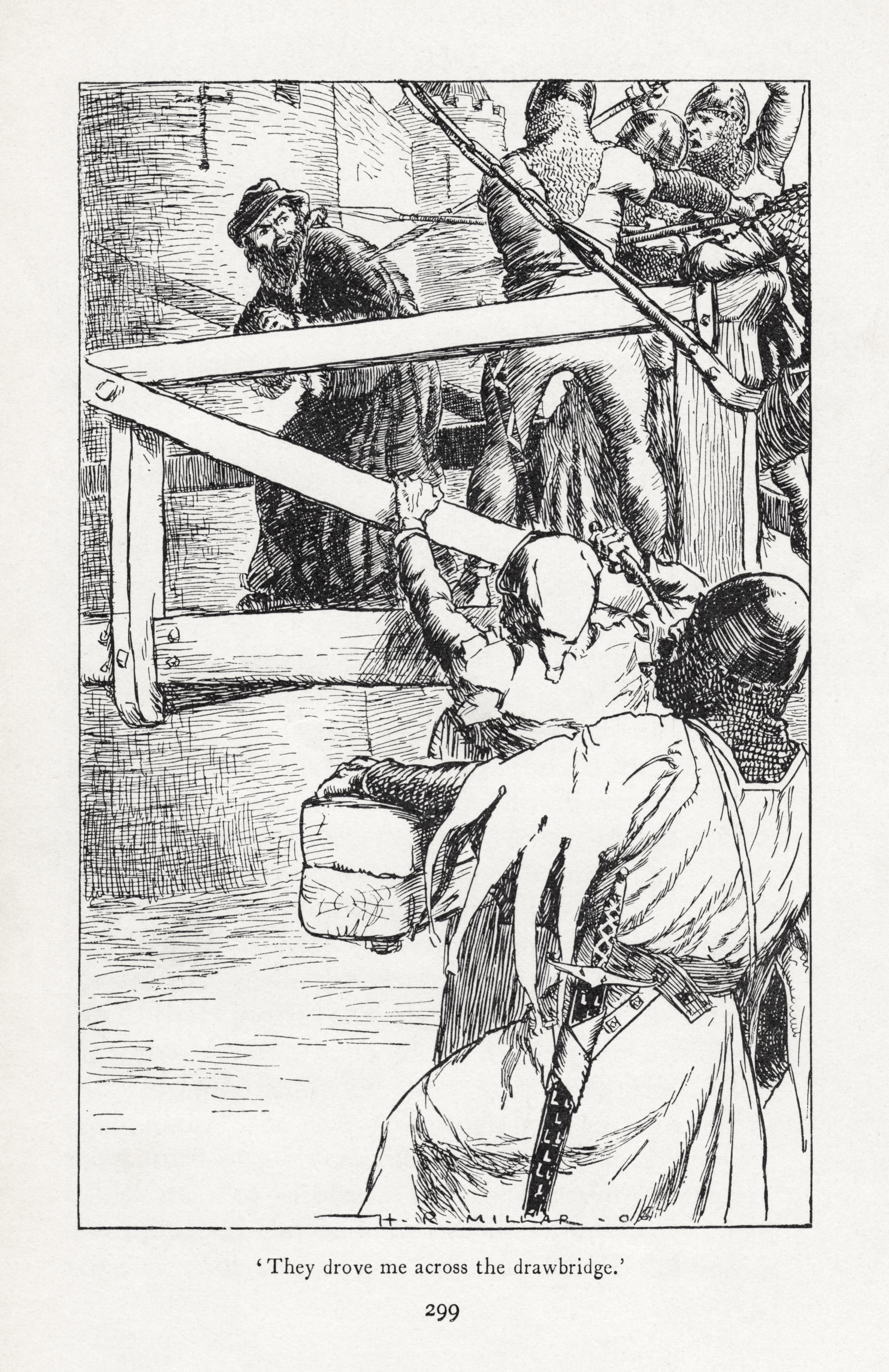
The Treasure and the Law: 'They drove me across the drawbridge'
