= The Crabfish =

Traditional song

Song
- Language: English
- Published: first c. 1620
- Songwriter(s): Traditional

"The Crabfish" (Roud 149, also known as "The Crayfish", "The Codfish", "The Old She-Crab", "The Lobster", "Tommy Doddler", or "A Combat Between an Ale-Wife and a Sea Crab") is a ribald humorous folk song of English origin. It is one of the most widespread English-language folk songs, being found in almost every English-speaking country and still being sung to the present day. The oldest known mention is in the seventeenth century, appearing in Bishop Percy's Folio Manuscript as a song named "The Sea Crabb" based on an earlier tale. The moral of the story is that one should look in the chamber pot before using it.

Owing to the coarseness of the lyrics, this ballad was excluded from Francis James Child's The English and Scottish Popular Ballads as well as many other academic publications.

== Synopsis ==
A man brings a crabfish (most likely a common lobster) home as a gift for his wife and puts it in the chamber pot. Some time in the night his wife answers a call of nature and the crustacean grabs her private parts. In the ensuing scuffle the husband gets bitten too in some versions.

== Text ==
This is one version of the song, as sung by John Roberts and Tony Barrand:

Fisherman, fisherman, standing by the sea
Have you got a crayfish that you can sell to me
By the way side high diddly aye do

Yes sir, yes sir, that indeed I do
I have got a crayfish that I can sell to you
By the way side high diddly aye do

Well, I took the crayfish home, and I thought he'd like a swim
So I filled up the chamber pot, and I threw the bugger in
By the way side high diddly aye do

In the middle of the night, I thought I'd have a fit
When my old lady got up to a-have a shit
By the way side high diddly aye do

Husband, husband, she cried out to me
The devil's in the chamber pot, and he's got hold of me
By the way side high diddly aye do

Children, children, bring the looking glass
Come and see the crayfish that bit your mother's arse
By the way side high diddly aye do

Children, children, did you hear the grunt
Come and see the crayfish that bit your mother's cunt
By the way side high diddly aye do

It's the ending of me story; I don't have any more
I've an apple in me pocket, and you can have the core
By the way side high diddly aye do

== Variants ==
"Johnny Daddlum" is the Irish version of this song. There are some variants in which the coarse language is more clear-cut than in others, and other variants where the language is masked with another word yet implied through the rhyme. In some variants the wife is pregnant, having previously told her husband about her craving to eat crabfish meat.

== Selected commercial recordings ==
- Harry Cox, "The Catfish" (field recording, 1953)
- Dave Sear and Oscar Brand, "The Codfish Song" (Bawdy Songs Goes to College, 1957)
- John Pearse and Frank Purslow, "The Crabfish" (Rap-a-Tap-Tap, 1960)
- Roberts and Barrand, "The Crayfish" (Across the Western Ocean, 1973)
- Jerry Bryant and Richard "Salty Dick" Docker, "The Crabfish" (Salty Dick's Uncensored Sailor Songs, 2004)
