= William Bloke =

1996 studio album by Billy Bragg

Studio album by Billy Bragg
- Released: 10 September 1996
- Recorded: February–June 1996
- Studio: Cathouse Studios, Streatham; Pavillion Studios, London W10; Chiswick Reach, London
- Genre: Folk rock
- Length: 41:15
- Label: Cooking Vinyl
- Producer: Grant Showbiz

Billy Bragg chronology
Don't Try This at Home (1991)	William Bloke (1996)	Bloke on Bloke (1997)

Professional ratings
Review scores
Source	Rating
Allmusic	3/5 stars
Alternative Press	5/5 stars
Entertainment Weekly	B
NME	(7/10)
Q	4/5 stars
Rolling Stone	2/5 stars
Spin	(7/10)

William Bloke is the seventh album by alternative folk artist Billy Bragg, released in September 1996, five years after his last studio album. It peaked at number 16 on the UK Albums Chart. The album's only single, "Upfield", reached number 46 on the UK Singles Chart in August 1996. The album's title is a pun on the 18th-century English poet William Blake.

== Background ==
After the release of 1991's Don't Try This at Home, Billy Bragg became a father in 1993 and took time out to concentrate on fatherhood before recording William Bloke in 1996. Bragg has said that he saw the albums he made in the 1980s as "ideologically political" because that's how he viewed his country of Britain. However, by the mid-1990s, he felt that things had moved into "a less clear phase", and with his family life having changed completely, "those two things are what you're hearing on the album."

The album's lyrics deal with themes such as lost idealism ("From Red to Blue"), lamenting the loss of childhood dreams ("The Space Race Is Over"), latent revolution ("A Pict Song"), romance ("The Fourteenth of February"), domesticity and fatherhood ("Brickbat"), and family values ("King James Version").

"Northern Industrial Town" was written about the Northern Ireland conflict. Bragg said in 1996, "It seemed to me that during the cease-fire I saw the first photographs on television of Belfast without any troops or police on the street. Suddenly I realized what a normal place it was. What was happening there was absolutely abnormal; it looked like Vietnam or Yugoslavia – but it ain't, and I wanted to write a song that reflected that realization."

The lyrics to "A Pict Song" are by English poet Rudyard Kipling. The lyrics to "Goalhanger" use the first verse of "The Little Man Who Wasn't There".

== Track listing ==
Adapted from album liner notes.

All tracks written by Billy Bragg; except where indicated.

1. "From Red to Blue" – 3:21
2. "Upfield" – 4:07
3. "Everybody Loves You Babe" – 3:10
4. "Sugar Daddy" – 4:37
5. "A Pict Song" (words: Rudyard Kipling) – 4:56
6. "Brickbat" – 3:14
7. "The Space Race Is Over" – 4:26
8. "Northern Industrial Town" – 2:58
9. "The Fourteenth of February" – 3:27
10. "King James Version" – 3:21
11. "Goalhanger" – 3:47

Hidden bonus track on LP version

12. "Qualifications" – 1:48

2006 CD reissue bonus disc

1. "As Long As You Hold Me" [demo, November 1994] – 3:26
2. "Who's Gonna Shoe Your Pretty Little Feet" (words and music adaptation by Woody Guthrie) [demo, August 1995] – 1:42
3. "Sugardaddy" [demo, October 1995] – 4:07
4. "Space Race Is Over" [demo, October 1995] – 5:10
5. "Goalhanger" [demo, October 1995] – 2:43
6. "Upfield" [demo, October 1995] – 5:03
7. "Fourteenth of February" [demo, February 1996] – 3:26
8. "Qualifications" [LP version bonus track, June 1996] – 1:48
9. "Never Had No One Ever" (Morrissey, Johnny Marr) [from The Smiths Is Dead; August 1996] – 3:40
10. "Thatcherites" (music: traditional) [B-side of "Upfield"; from the William Bloke sessions] – 4:13
11. "All Fall Down" (Alan Hull) [February 1997] – 3:34

Notes

- Tracks 1–7 and 11 are previously unreleased.
- Track 1 was rerecorded by Kirsty MacColl and released in 1995 on the Mad Love soundtrack.

== Personnel ==
Credits adapted from album liner notes.

- Billy Bragg – guitar, vocals
- Terry Disley – Hammond B3 organ (1), strings (6, 9), string arrangement
- Fionn O'Lochlainn – bass (2, 4)
- J. F. T. Hood – drums (2, 4, 7, 9, 11), percussion (7, 11)
- Cara Tivey – organ (2, 4), piano (2, 3, 4, 9), keyboards (7, 9, 11)
- Terry Edwards – saxophones (2, 11)
- Caroline Hall – trombone (2, 11)
- Dave Woodhead – trumpet (2, 11), flugelhorn (4), brass arrangement
- Deirdre Cooper – cello (6, 9)
- Chris Morgan – double bass (7, 10)
- Chucho Merchan – double bass (9)
- Ashley Drees – mandolin (10)
- Nigel Frydman – bass (11)

Technical

- Grant Showbiz – producer
- Andy Peak – engineer
- Tim Young – mastering
- Jeff Kleinsmith – artwork
- Paul Slattery – photography

2006 CD reissue bonus tracks

- Billy Bragg – vocals, guitar, keyboards (7), banjo (11)
- Cara Tivey – piano (4, 6), keyboards (4)
- The Mint Juleps – backing vocals (6)
- Nigel Frydman – bass (9)
- J. F. T. Hood – drums (9)
- Dave Woodhead – trumpet (9)
- Caroline Hall – trombone (9)
- Terry Edwards – saxophones (9)
- Elliet Mackrell – violin (10)
- Ashley Drees – mandolin (10)
- Rory Campbell – bodhran (10)
- Eliza Carthy – violin (11), vocals (11)
- Grant Showbiz – producer (8–11)
- Philip "Wiggy" Wigg – recording (2)
