= The Cherry-Tree Carol =

Christmas carol ballad

- Genre: Ballad; Christmas carol

"The Cherry-Tree Carol" (Roud 453) is a ballad with the rare distinction of being both a Christmas carol and one of the Child Ballads (no. 54). The song itself is very old, reportedly sung in some form at the Feast of Corpus Christi in the early 15th century.

== Synopsis ==
The ballad relates an apocryphal story of the Virgin Mary, presumably while traveling to Bethlehem with Joseph for the census. In the most popular version, the two stop in a cherry orchard, and Mary asks her husband to pick cherries for her, citing her child. Joseph spitefully tells Mary to let the child's father pick her cherries.

At this point in most versions, the infant Jesus, from the womb, speaks to the tree and commands it to lower a branch down to Mary, which it does. Joseph, witnessing this miracle, immediately repents his harsh words. The more contemporary versions sometimes end here, while others often include an angel appearing to Joseph and telling him of the circumstances of Jesus's birth. Other versions then jump ahead several years, where the next verse picks up with Jesus on his mother's lap, telling her of his eventual death and resurrection.

== Sources ==
The story may be derived from the apocryphal Gospel of Pseudo-Matthew, written around the year 650, which combines many earlier apocryphal Nativity traditions; however, in Pseudo-Matthew, the event takes place during the flight into Egypt, and the fruit tree is a palm tree (presumably a Date Palm) rather than a cherry tree. In the apocryphal Gospel, Jesus has already been born and so Joseph's truculence is unrelated to any dismay over Mary's pregnancy, but has to do with an inability to reach the fruits of the palm and a concern over the family's lack of water.

The carol is found in the “N-Town Plays,” written in East Harling, a village in Norfolk, England in the 1400s. The song is very similar to a passage in one of the Coventry Mystery Plays. Having developed out of the folk tradition, there are a number of versions of text and tune.

== Recordings ==
=== Traditional ===
In the early 1930s, James Madison Carpenter made a recording of an 80-year-old man named Henry Thomas from St. Just, Cornwall, England singing a version which came from his great-grandmother who lived in the 1700s; the recording is available online via the Vaughan Williams Memorial Library website, along with Carpenter's transcriptions of the lyrics and melody. Many other traditional versions have been collected in the last century, such as an audio recording of Bob Arnold of Burford, Oxfordshire, England, and another of Thomas Moran of Mohill, Co. Leitrim, Ireland.

Alan Lomax recorded three versions in Kentucky in the late 1930s, including from the traditional singer Aunt Molly Jackson, all of which can be heard online. Jean Ritchie, also of Kentucky, recorded two traditional versions with slightly different tunes. The version sung on Ritchie's album Carols for All Seasons (1959), and later on her sister Edna's eponymous LP of traditional songs (1962), later became popular after a recording by Joan Baez.

Oli Steadman recorded the song as part of the collection "365 Days Of Folk".

=== Popular ===
Joan Baez took one of the Kentucky versions, probably from Jean Ritchie or Aunt Molly Jacson, releasing her own rendition in 1961 on the album Joan Baez, Vol. 2 with an added guitar accompaniment, bringing this version of the song mainstream popularity. Various versions of the song have been recorded by Shirley Collins & Davy Graham (also by herself and with The Young Tradition), Marty Haugen, Kacy & Clayton, the Clancy Brothers (as "When Joseph Was an Old Man"), Judy Collins, José Feliciano, Emmylou Harris, Mary Hopkin (as B-side of the single "Mary had a Baby/Cherry Tree Carol"), the King's College Choir, Cindy Kallet, Magpie Lane, Mark Lanegan, Colin Meloy, the Chad Mitchell Trio, Nowell Sing We Clear, Pentangle, Angelo Branduardi (two Italian versions: "Il ciliegio" and "Rosa di Galilea"), Peter Paul and Mary, Casey Stratton, Bob Rowe, John Rutter (with the Cambridge Singers), the Poor Clares from New Orleans ("Cherry Tree Carol" on their album Songs for Midwinter), Sting (If on a Winter's Night), Ron Block on his album Carter's Creek Christmas, Joe Weed, on his album Prairie Christmas, and Kerfuffle (as "Cherry Tree Carol" on their Midwinter album Lighten the Dark).

== See also ==
- List of the Child Ballads
- List of Christmas carols
