= Reginald Spofforth =

English musician

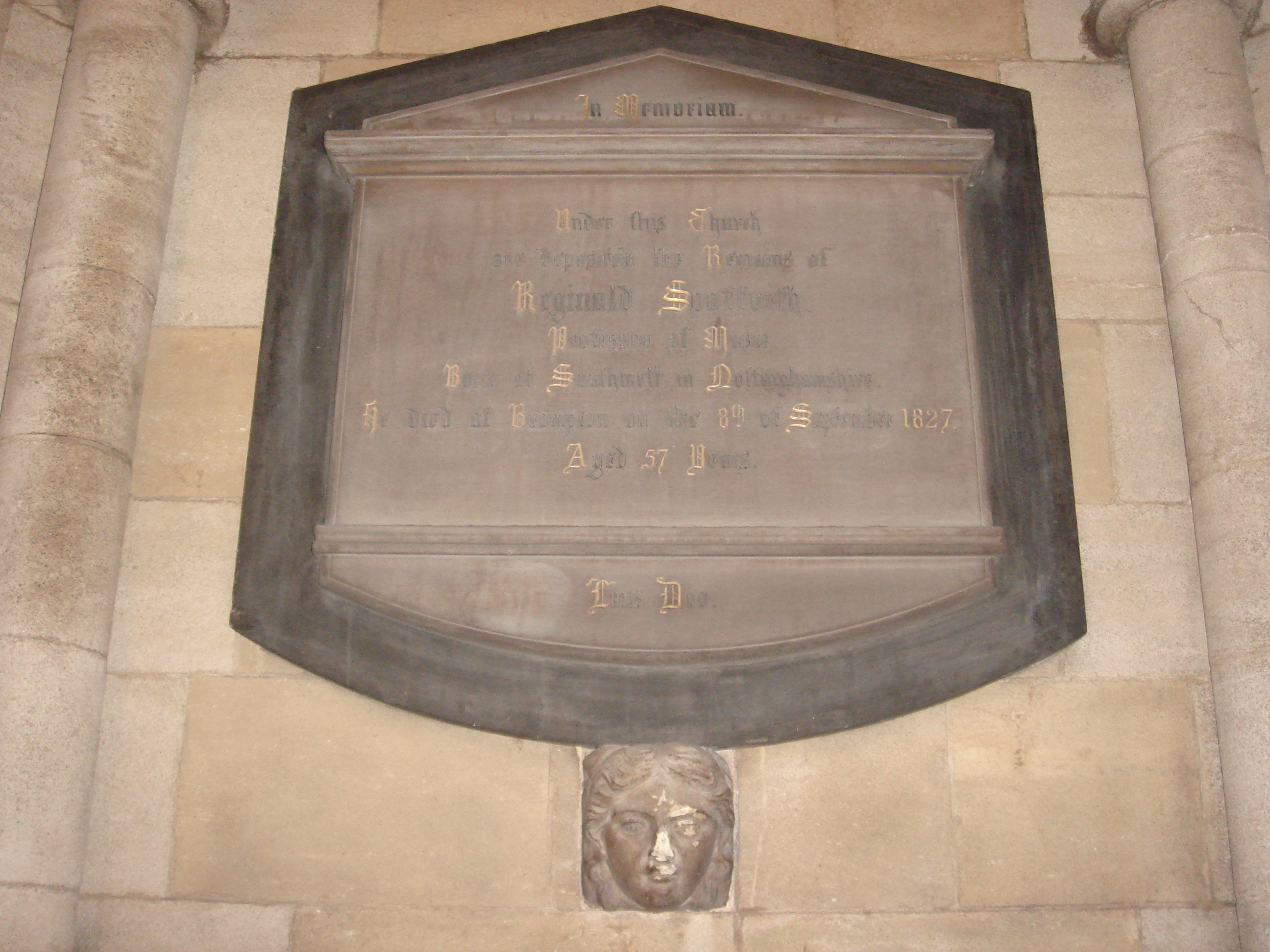
Memorial in St Mary Abbots, Kensington

Reginald Spofforth (1769 (baptised 12 September) – 8 September 1827) was an English musician. He was born in Southwell, Nottinghamshire, but moved to London around 1790. He was active as an organist, conductor and music teacher, but he is best remembered as a composer. His best known works are the glees Hail Smiling Morn (which has been described as having been "possibly the most popular glee in the entire repertory") and Hark! the Lark at Heaven's Gate Sings, which are included in a number of recent collections of part-songs.

He composed about 75 glees, three books of nursery rhyme settings, and many songs and duets, including songs for various stage performances at Covent Garden in the 1790s. Two elaborate hymns (To Thee, our Saviour and our King, and I sing the almighty power of God) were published in John Page's 'A Collection of Hymns', dated 21 and 28 October 1804 respectively. He is thought not to have composed any instrumental music.

His brother, Samuel, was cathedral organist at Peterborough and Lichfield, and composed chants and cathedral music.
