= Hail Smiling Morn =

Traditional song

Hail Smiling Morn, Roud #1346, is a glee which is sung either as a Christmas carol or as an Easter carol, and features in the Yorkshire pub Christmas singing traditions found in several parts of the city of Sheffield. It is performed also by choral societies in Saddleworth, Huddersfield, and Bradford. Shape Note singers sing this song during the Christmas season from An American Christmas Harp.

The song is associated with the Saddleworth Whit Friday tradition, and is also sung during Selkirk Common Riding, a centuries-old annual festival in the Scottish Borders town which commemorates the battle of Flodden in 1513.

It was composed in 1810 by Reginald Spofforth and has been described as having been "possibly the most popular glee in the entire repertory". An arrangement for SATB and piano is published by Banks' Music in their "York Series".

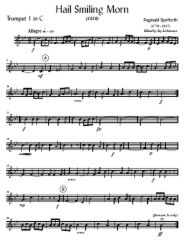

Hail smiling morn, smiling morn,
That tips the hills with gold, that tips the hills with gold,
Whose rosy fingers ope the gates of day,
Ope the gates, the gates of day,
Hail! Hail! Hail! Hail!

Who the gay face of nature doth unfold,
Who the gay face of nature doth unfold,
At whose bright presence darkness flies away, flies away,
Darkness flies away, darkness flies away,
At whose bright presence darkness flies away, flies away,
Hail! Hail! Hail! Hail!
Hail! Hail! Hail! Hail!

Hail Smiling Morn
A cappella performance by the Edison Quartet, 1904
