= The Bitter Withy =

Traditional song

The Bitter Withy or Mary Mild (Roud #452) is an English folk song reflecting an unusual and apocryphal vernacular idea of Jesus Christ. The withy of the title is the Willow and the song gives an explanation as to why the willow tree rots from the centre out, rather than the outside in. The song was recorded by The Kingston Trio on their album The Last Month of the Year. English folk artist John Tams recorded the song on his album The Reckoning (2005; won 2006 the BBC Radio 2 Folk Award for the 'Best Album') and is contained in The Definitive Collection (2007). Oli Steadman included it on his song collection "365 Days Of Folk".

== Lyrics ==
As it fell out on a holy day,
The drops of rain did fall, did fall,
Our Saviour asked leave of His mother, Mary,
If He might go play at ball.

“To play at ball, my own dear Son,
It’s time you was going or gone, or gone,
But be sure let me hear no complaint of you,
At night when you do come home.”

It was upling scorn and downling scorn!
Oh, there He met three jolly jerdins
Oh, there He asked the three jolly jerkins
If they would go play at ball.

“Oh, we are lords’ and ladies’ sons,
Born in bower or in hall, in hall.
And you are but some poor maid's child
Born in an ox's stall.”

“Oh, if you are lords’ and ladies’ sons,
Born in bower or in hall, in hall.
Then at the very last I’ll make it appear
That I am above you all.”

Our Saviour built a bridge with the beams of the sun,
And over He gone, He gone He;
And after followed the three jolly jerdins,
And drownded they were all three.

It was up the hill and down the hill!
The mothers of them did whoop and call,
Crying out: “Mary mild, call home your child,
For ours are drownded all!”

Mary mild, Mary mild called home her Child,
And laid our Saviour across her knee,
And with a whole handful of bitter withy
She gave Him slashes three.

Then He says to His Mother: “Oh, the withy! Oh, the withy!
The bitter withy that causes me to smart, to smart,
Oh, the withy, it shall be the very first tree
That perishes at the heart!”

== See also ==
- Jesus' cursing of the fig tree
