= Barley Mow =

Barley Mow may refer to:

- The Barley Mow (song), a cumulative song
- Barley Mow, Bramley, the former home ground of Bramley RLFC in Leeds, West Yorkshire, England
- The Barley Mow, Clifton Hampden, a pub in Oxfordshire, England
- The Barley Mow, Marylebone, a pub in London, England
