= Tony Barrand =

American folk singer (1945–2022)

- Born: Anthony Grant Barrand; 3 April 1945; Gainsborough, England
- Origin: Cornell University
- Died: 29 January 2022 (aged 76) Hanover, New Hampshire, U.S.
- Genres: Traditional folk music
- Instruments: Concertina, bowed psaltery, bodhran, bones, tambourine
- Years active: 1967—2022
- Label: Golden Hind Music
- Formerly of: Roberts and Barrand; Nowell Sing We Clear

Anthony Grant Barrand (3 April 1945 – 29 January 2022) was a British-born American folk singer and academic. He was a Professor of Anthropology, College of Arts and Sciences, Boston University, where his courses included "Stalking the Wild Mind: The Psychology and Folklore of Extra-Sensory Perception and Psychic Phenomena", "English Ritual Dance and Drama", and "Folk Songs as Social History".

== Early life and education ==
Barrand was born in Gainsborough, England. His parents were active in a Salvation Army brass band. His family moved to Bletchley when he was 10 years old, and became active Methodists. Barrand completed a Bachelor of Arts at The University of Keele. During his time at University, he spent one year at Swarthmore College, a liberal arts college in Pennsylvania; after graduating in England he moved to the United States, where the glass ceiling for scholars from working class backgrounds was less pronounced. He earned his Ph.D. from Cornell University in 1979. While at Cornell he also formed his ongoing music partnership with John Roberts, who was also a Ph.D. student in Psychology at the time.

== Music career ==
He is best known for his musical collaborations with John Roberts. As Roberts and Barrand, they performed a cappella and accompanied performances of traditional English folk music. They also performed and recorded fare such as sea shanties of the North Atlantic, and an album of traditional drinking songs. The duo was also half of the related act Nowell Sing We Clear, which, in addition to a number of albums, performs an annual yuletide concert series.

Barrand was also an expert morris and clog dancer, having taught across the United States, and written several books on the subject. He edited the journal Country Dance and Song and founded the Marlboro Morris Ale, an annual national gathering of Morris dancers in Vermont. In 2008 he was the recipient of the Lifetime Achievement Award of the Country Dance and Song Society for his pivotal role in teaching, researching, and videotaping Morris dance, as well as for his work as a traditional singer and musician.

Barrand's collection of film and video of morris, sword, and clog dancing was deposited in 2003, by invitation, to the American Folklife Center, as the Anthony Grant Barrand Collection of Morris, Sword, and Clog Dancing at the Library of Congress (catalog number AFC2003/5). By 2020 the collection was digitized and is available online at Boston University.

== Personal life ==
Since the late 1990s, multiple sclerosis limited Barrand's mobility, but not his academic work or musical performances. Barrand died on 29 January 2022 as a result of complications following a medical procedure. His second wife, Margaret Dale, died a week later.

== Works ==
=== Discography ===
- Northern Harmony (1990) Front Hall Records. Voorheesville, New York.
- with Keith Murphy
  - On the Banks of Coldbrook: Atwood Family Songs from the Hills of Vermont (2010)
- Roberts and Barrand recordings
  - Spencer the Rover is Alive and Well... (SwallowTail Records 1971, re-released Golden Hind Music 2001)
  - Across the Western Ocean (SwallowTail Records 1973, re-released Golden Hind Music 2000)
  - An Evening at the English Music Hall (Front Hall Records, 1974)
  - Mellow with Ale from the Horn (Front Hall Records, 1975, re-released Golden Hind Music 2008)
  - Dark Ships in the Forest (Folk-Legacy Records) (1977, re-released Golden Hind Music 1997) (with Fred Breunig and Steve Woodruff)
  - Live at Holsteins! (Front Hall Records, 1983, expanded re-release Golden Hind Music 2000)
  - A Present from the Gentlemen (1992)
  - Naulakha Redux: Songs of Rudyard Kipling (with Fred Breunig and Andy Davis) (Golden Hind Music, 1997)
  - Heartoutbursts: English Folksongs Collected by Percy Grainger (Golden Hind Music, 1998)
  - Twiddlum Twaddlum (Golden Hind Music, 2003)
- Nowell Sing We Clear recordings
  - Roberts, Barrand, Breunig, Woodruff:
    - Nowell Sing We Clear (Front Hall Records, 1977)
    - To Welcome in the Spring (Front Hall Records, 1980, re-released Golden Hind Music 2008)
    - The Second Nowell (Front Hall Records, 1981)
    - Nowell Sing We Clear, Vol. 3 (Front Hall Records, 1985)
    - The Best of Nowell Sing We Clear 1975–1986 (Front Hall Records, 1989, re-released Golden Hind Music 2007)
  - Roberts, Barrand, Breunig, Davis:
    - Nowell Sing We Four (Front Hall Records, 1988, re-released Golden Hind Music 2002)
    - Hail Smiling Morn! (1995)
    - Just Say Nowell (2000)
    - Nowell Nowell Nowell! (2008)
    - Bidding You Joy (2013)

=== Bibliography ===
- Northern Harmony: Plain Tunes, Fuging Tunes, and Anthems from the New England Singing School Traditions (fourth edition, 1998, editor, with Larry Gordon) Northern Harmony Publishing Co. ISBN 0-9627554-6-X
  - Second edition, 1990, with Larry Gordon and Carole Moody
  - First edition, 1980, with Carole Moody
- English Clog Dance Steps : Hornpipe, waltz, and reel (Revised edition, 1983) School for Traditional Dance and Song Press. Boston, Mass.
- Roy Dommett's Morris Notes (1986, editor) Country Dance and Song Society of America. Northampton, Mass.
  - Volume 1: Cotswold or Wychwood Morris
  - Volume 2: North-West Morris
  - Volume 3: Garland Dances
  - Volume 4: Sword Dances
  - Volume 5: Other Morris
- Morris Dance in America : Proceedings of the 1991 Conference (1991, editor, with Jocelyn Reynolds)
- Six Fools and a Dancer : The Timeless Way of the Morris (1991) ISBN 0-9627554-1-9
- Longsword Dances from Traditional and Manuscript Sources : As Collated and Notated by Ivor Allsop (1996, editor) Northern Harmony Publishing Co.
- Morris, Sword, and Clog Dancing : English and American Performances, 1976 – present (film and video archive, 2003)
