= John Roberts (musician) =

English folk musician (1944–2025)

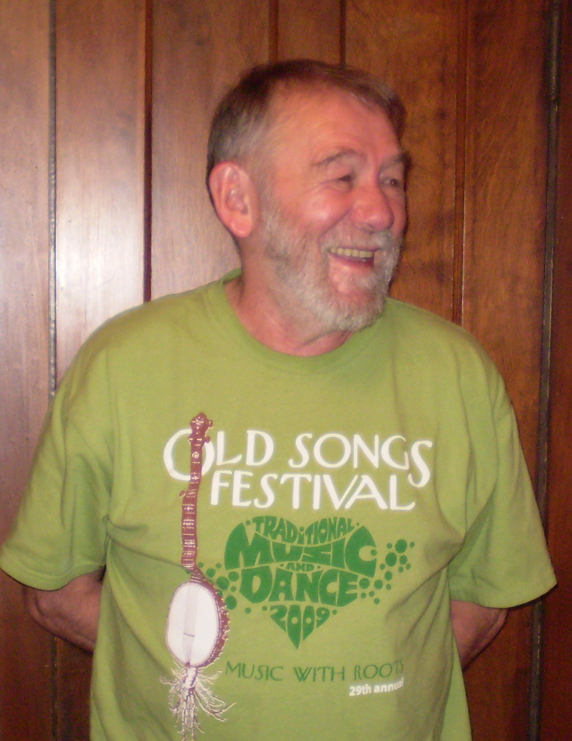
- Roberts in 2009

Background information
- Born: 5 May 1944; Worcestershire, England
- Died: 30 January 2025 (aged 80) Schenectady, New York, United States
- Genre: Traditional folk music
- Instruments: Vocals, concertina, banjo
- Years active: 1969–2025
- Label: Golden Hind Music
- Member of: Nowell Sing We Clear, Curragh
- Formerly of: John Roberts and Tony Barrand
- Website: https://johnrobertsmusic.com/

John Roberts (May 5, 1944 – January 30, 2025) was an English folk singer, songwriter, and musician who lived and performed in the United States. He performed traditional folk songs, including ballads, a cappella singing, and sea shanties, both as a solo artist and with Tony Barrand as Roberts and Barrand. He was also a member of Nowell Sing We Clear.

== Early life and education ==
John Roberts was born in Worcestershire, England, of Welsh ancestry. He moved to the United States to study graduate level psychology at Cornell University.

In 1968, while at Cornell, Roberts met Tony Barrand. Both Roberts and Barrand joined the Cornell Folk Song Club and for several years served as co-presidents.

== Career ==
Roberts is known for his musical collaborations with Tony Barrand. As Roberts and Barrand, they performed "a cappella" and accompanied performances of traditional English folk music. They also performed and recorded fare such as Sea shanties of the North Atlantic, and an album of traditional drinking songs. the duo was also half of the related act "Nowell Sing We Clear" - which in addition to a number of albums - performs an annual yuletide concert series.

Roberts also had a solo career. Daniel Neely of the Irish Echo called John Roberts one of the great voices of traditional song. He performed across the East Coast at cities including Altamont and Glens Falls, New York.

In 1975, Roberts was the featured solo artist in the fifth concert of the Fall Folk Series at Hubbard Hall, a historic opera house and performing arts center in Cambridge, New York. The Post-Star described Roberts as "one of the important influences in the revival of English folk music in North America." His repertoire included traditional songs from England, Wales, Ireland and Scotland, together with traditional and contemporary North American folk music. He performed both unaccompanied and with guitar, banjo, and English and Anglo concertinas. On April 2, 1978 WXPN Philadelphia radio station broadcast a 3 hour radio show program with John Roberts, on British Folk Music. On January 12, 1980 John Roberts and Cliff Haslam presented "An Evening of English Folk Songs" at the Chelsea House Folklore Center in Brattleboro, Vermont.

In 2007, Roberts released his first solo album, Sea Fever.

He was a member of the trio Ye Mariners All (with John Rockwell and Larry Young), and performed regularly with upstate New York's Broken String Band. In recent years he had performed with his partner Lisa Preston, as well as folksinger Debra Cowen.

He was a regular at the Old Songs Festival both as a performer and Master of Ceremonies for evening concerts.

== Death ==
Roberts died on 30 January 2025, at the age of 80.

== Discography ==
=== Solo ===
Sea Fever (2003) Golden Hind Music

1. "Campañero"
2. "Diego's Bold Shore"
3. "The Bonny Ship the Diamond"
4. "Candlelight Fisherman"
5. "Farewell Nancy"
6. "The Weeping Willow Tree"
7. "The Boatman's Cure"
8. "Short Jacket and White Trousers"
9. "Sir Patrick Spens"
10. "Let the Bulgine Run/Sally in the Garden/Hog-Eye Man"
11. "The Black Cook"
12. "The Saucy Sailor"
13. "The Old Figurehead Carver"
14. "What Fortunes Guide a Sailor/Leave Her Johnny"

=== Ye Mariners All ===
Songs of the Sea (2003) Golden Hind Music

1. "The 'Fame' of Salem"
2. "Marcherot"
3. "The Steam Packet"
4. "Wings of a Goney"
5. "Pique la Baleine"
6. "Three Jolly Fishermen"
7. "Jack Robinson"
8. "Old Billy Riley-O"
9. "Hourra les Filles"
10. "Serafina"
11. "Rolling Down to Old Maui"
12. "Yangtse River Chantey"
13. "The 'Balaena'"
14. "Hullabaloo Belay"
15. "You Gentlemen of Boston"
16. "Nantucket Point/Off She Goes"
17. "Noah's Ark Chantey"
18. "The 'Jamestown' Homeward Bound"

=== Roberts and Barrand ===
- Spencer the Rover is Alive and Well… (1971, 2001)
- Across the Western Ocean (1973, 2000)
- Mellow With Ale From the Horn (1975)
- Dark Ships in the Forest (1977, 1997)
- Live at Holsteins! (1983)
- A Present from the Gentlemen (1992)
- Naulakha Redux (1997)
- Heartoutbursts (1998)
- Twiddlum Twaddlum (2003)

=== Nowell Sing We Clear ===
- Nowell Sing We Clear (1977)
- To Welcome In The Spring (1980)
- The Second Nowell (1981)
- Nowell Sing We Clear, Vol. 3 (1985)
- Nowell Sing We Four (1988)
- the best of Nowell Sing We Clear 1975–1986 (1989)
- Hail Smiling Morn! (1995)
- Just Say Nowell (2000)
- Nowell Nowell Nowell! (2008)
- Bidding You Joy (2013)

=== John Roberts and Debra Cowan ===
Ballads Long & Short (2015) Golden Hinds Music

1. "Drive Dull Care Away"
2. "The Broadside Man"
3. "The Tailor's Breeches"
4. "Fair Annie"
5. "Garners Gay"
6. "Combing the Mane"
7. "The 'Cornstalk'"
8. "The Bonny Hind"
9. "Twa Corbies"
10. "When Fortune Turns the Wheel"
11. "Gypsum Davy"
12. "Jim Jones"
13. "Anderson's Coast"
14. "Bold Riley"
