= Jean-Alain =

Jean-Alain is a French masculine given name. Notable people with the name include:

- Jean-Alain Boumsong (born 1979), French former footballer
- Jean-Alain Fanchone (born 1988), French footballer
- Jean-Alain Tremblay (1952–2005; born Jeannot Tremblay), Canadian writer

== See also ==
- Alain Aspect (born 1947; middle name Jean), French physicist
- Alain Dorval (1946–2024; born Alain Fernand Jean-Marie Bergé) French actor
- Alain Giresse (born 1952; middle name Jean), French football coach and former player
- Alain Guillerm (1944–2005; middle name Jean), French historian
- Alain Jean-Marie (born 1945), French pianist
- Alain Nasreddine (born 1975; second name Jean-Paul), Canadian ice hockey coach and former player
- Alain Nonat (1942–2024; second name Jean), French-born Canadian opera singer and educator
- Erik Maris (born 1964; third and fourth names Jean Alain), French businessman, racing driver and navigator
- Jean Alain Rodríguez Sánchez (born 1975), Dominican lawyer, politician and former Attorney General of the Dominican Republic
- Jean-Pierre Jabouille (1942–2023; middle name Alain), French racing driver and engineer
- Jean Roussel (born 1951; middle name Alain), Mauritian musician, composer, record producer, arranger, educator and music therapist
- JA (disambiguation)
