= Ellen Stekert =

Professor of English and folksinger

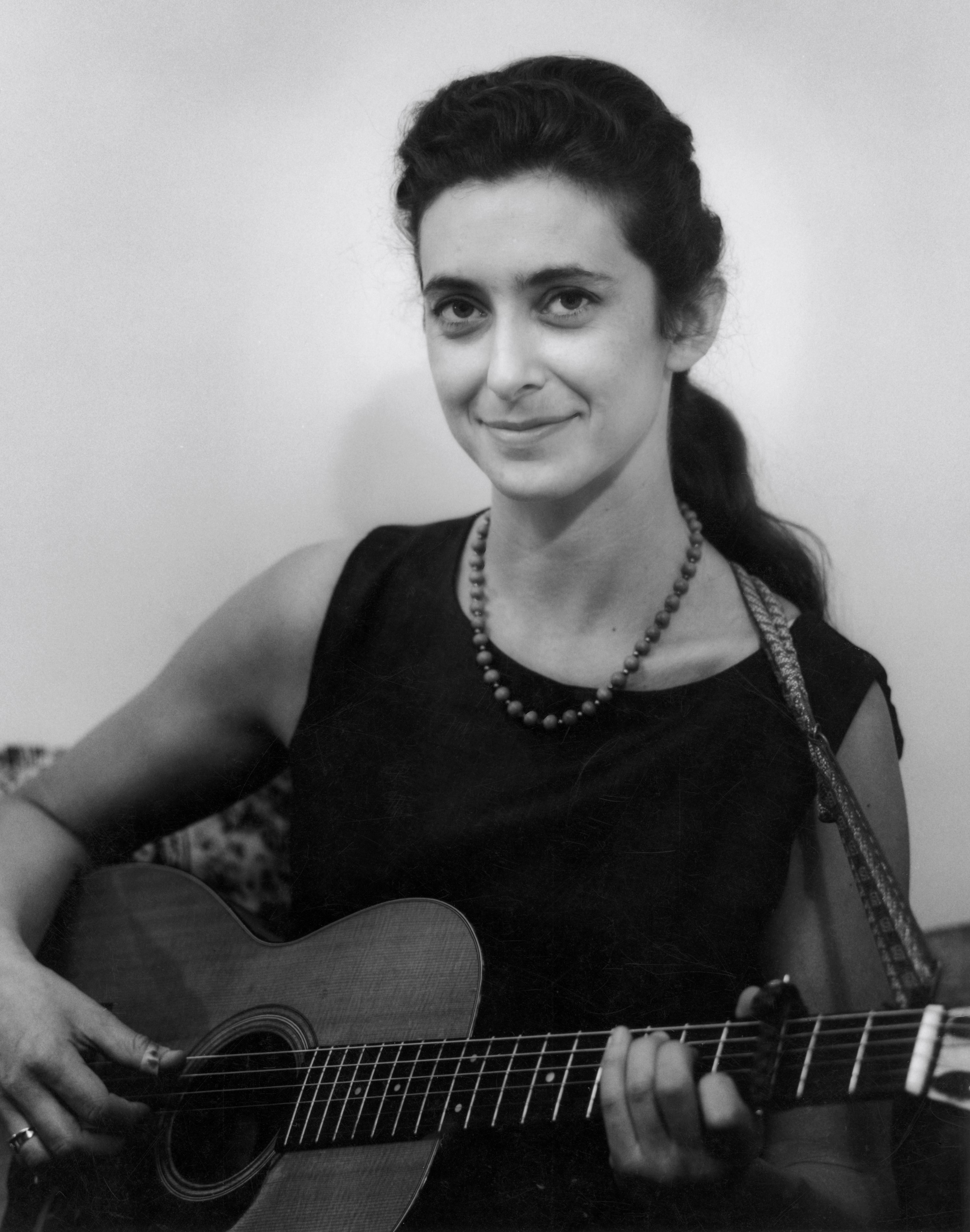
- Stekert in 1965
- Born: May 26, 1935 (age 91); New York City, New York, United States
- Occupations: Academic, folklorist, and musician
- Notable work: Songs of a New York Lumberjack, Ballads of Careless Love

Academic background
- Education: Cornell University (BA); Indiana University (MA); University of Pennsylvania, Philadelphia (PhD)
- Thesis: Two Voices of Tradition: The Influence of Personality and Collecting Environment upon the Songs of Two Traditional Folksingers (1965)

Academic work
- Discipline: English, folklore
- Institutions: University of Minnesota; Wayne State University
- Notable works: The Urban Experience and Folk Tradition
- Musical career
- Genre: Folk music
- Occupation: Singer
- Instruments: Guitar, banjo, mandolin, harmonica
- Website: ellenstekert.com

Ellen Stekert (born 26 May 1935) is an American academic, folklorist, and musician. Stekert is a professor emerita of English at the University of Minnesota and a former president of the American Folklore Society. She has been called "one of the country's leading authorities on folklore."

As a musician, Stekert released four albums of folk music in the 1950s, including Songs Of A New York Lumberjack and (with Milton Okun) Traditional American Love Songs, and continued to perform occasionally during her academic career. She was cited by Bob Dylan in his memoir as an early musical influence.

== Early life and education ==
Stekert was born in New York City in 1935 and grew up in Great Neck on Long Island. She survived polio as a child. Stekert began performing folk music in high school.

Stekert majored in philosophy at Cornell University, where she took classes taught by the folklorist Harold Thompson, who she also assisted in teaching. As part of her work as Harold Thompson's teaching assistant, Stekert sang folk songs in Thompson's American Folk Literature course, accompanying herself on guitar. (Thompson's other singing graduate assistants included Peter Yarrow, later of the trio Peter, Paul and Mary.)

As her interest in folklore grew, Stekert began doing fieldwork, collecting folksongs from traditional singers in upstate New York. The songs Stekert collected from Ezra "Fuzzy" Barhight, a retired lumberjack from Cohocton, New York, she recorded and released as Songs of a New York Lumberjack in 1958.

After graduating in philosophy at Cornell, Stekert began a master's degree in folklore at Indiana University. There she continued her fieldwork, collecting folk songs in Kentucky and Southern Indiana. On completion of her MA, Stekert began research for a PhD in folklore in Indiana. She completed her doctorate at the University of Pennsylvania, Philadelphia in 1965.

== Career ==
=== As academic and folklorist ===
Stekert's first teaching position was at Wayne State University in Detroit. As director of Wayne State's Folklore Archives, Stekert built upon the pioneering work of Thelma James in the collection of urban folklore traditions. In 1968, Stekert organized a symposium, "The Urban Experience and Folk Tradition", at Wayne State. She and University of Texas professor Américo Paredes later edited the presentations into a special issue of the Journal of American Folklore, which was itself expanded into the 1971 book The Urban Experience and Folk Tradition. The four essays which made up the book focused on how the study of folklore, at the time considered largely a study of rural folk groups, could be applied to populations in large urban cities. Stekert's essay examined the difficulties and changing beliefs of Appalachian migrants who had settled in Detroit.

From there, she moved to the University of Minnesota where she was based for the rest of her academic career, as a professor in the English and American Studies departments.

Stekert was president of the American Folklore Society from 1976 to 1978, and served on its board from 1970 to 1978.

Stekert was appointed Minnesota's first state folklorist.

In 1986, Stekert was a consultant for the Science Museum of Minnesota exhibit Wolves and Humans: Coexistence, Competition, and Conflict, writing and giving lectures on the often contradictory lore and mythology of wolves in folklore. The exhibit traveled to several museums across the U.S., including the American Museum of Natural History.

=== As folksinger ===
Stekert began performing in high school and continued at Cornell, where she became involved with the 1950s folk-music scene in Greenwich Village. She released four albums during the 1950s and also appeared on numerous folk-music compilations. She is proficient in guitar, banjo, harmonica, and mandolin. Although Stekert's academic career took precedence over her musical career, she continued to perform frequently for many years.

In his memoir Chronicles: Volume One, Bob Dylan wrote that during his days living in Minneapolis, he learned some of his early material from watching Stekert perform.

She recorded as a duo with Milt Okun on several occasions, most notably on the 1957 album Traditional American Love Songs, a collection of songs mainly from English, Scottish and Irish sources. Bruce Eder of AllMusic called the album a "low-key and serious entry in the late-'50s folk music revival", and speculated that Stekert and Okun's version of "The Cambric Shirt" may have inspired Simon and Garfunkel's adaptation of the song as "Scarborough Fair/Canticle". Eder also praised Stekert's "considerable solo talents" on the song "Shule Aroo." David Dicaire, in his 2011 book The Folk Music Revival. Biographies Of Fifty Performers And Other Influential People, called Stekert and Okun's "The Cambric Shirt" a "folk classic" and likewise suggested that it may have been an influence on Simon and Garfunkel's version. He called the album "by far the best record Okun released as an artist."

On 1958's Songs of a New York Lumberjack, Stekert sang 18 songs she had collected from 81-year-old Ezra "Fuzzy" Barhight as part of her work as an academic folklorist. Reviewer Ed Cray of the journal Western Folklore called the album "outstanding".

Although Stekert did not release an album after the late 1950s, she continued to record her concerts and other performances and built up a large archive of unreleased music. In 2025, Stekert began working with producer and musician Ross Wylde to remaster these tapes. The first collection of material, 10 songs recorded between 1954 and 1980, was released in March 2025 as Go Round Songs, Vol. 1.

Other recordings followed, including Camera Three, recorded in 1959 for the CBS news show of the same name, which included a version of the previously unknown and undocumented Woody Guthrie song "High Floods & Low Waters". The performance also featured notable folk musicians Jean Ritchie, Oscar Brand, Dave Sear, and the New Lost City Ramblers.

== Personal life ==
Stekert no longer sings due to post-polio health complications. She lives with her partner Beth in South Minneapolis. Although she has retired from professorship, she occasionally still speaks on topics surrounding folklore.

== Selected publications ==
=== Books ===
- Américo Paredes and Ellen Jane Stekert (eds.) The Urban Experience and Folk Tradition. Published for the American Folklore Society by the University of Texas Press (1971)

=== Articles ===
- Ellen Stekert, "Fairy Palace". Western Folklore (1959)
- Ellen Stekert, "The Hidden Informant." Midwest Folklore (1963)
- Ellen Stekert. “The Snake-Handling Sect of Harlan County, Kentucky: Its Influence on Folk Tradition.” Southern Folklore Quarterly (1963)
- Ellen Stekert, "Four Pennsylvania Songs Learned Before 1900, From the Repertoire of Ezra V. Barhight" in Two Penny Ballads and Four Dollar Whiskey: A Pennsylvania Folklore Miscellany, ed. Robert H. Byington and Kenneth S. Goldstein (1966)
- Ellen J. Stekert, "Foreword: The Urban Experience and Folk Tradition." Journal of American Folklore (1970)
- Ellen J. Stekert, "Focus for Conflict: Southern Mountain Medical Beliefs in Detroit". Journal of American Folklore (1970)
- Richard M. Dorson, Ronald L. Baker, Robert H. Byington, George Carey, Robert A. Georges, Thomas A. Green, Ellen J. Stekert, Robert T. Teske, "The Academic Future of Folklore". Journal of American Folklore (1972)
- Ellen J. Stekert, "The False Issue of Folklore vs. 'Fakelore': Was Paul Bunyan a Hoax?" Journal of Forest History (1986)
- Mary Jane Hennigar, Daniel Hoffman, and Ellen J. Stekert. “The First Paul Bunyan Story in Print [with Commentary].” Journal of Forest History (1986)
- Ellen J. Stekert, "Autobiography of a Woman Folklorist". Journal of American Folklore (1987)
- Ellen J. Stekert and Luz María Umpierre, "Deviance and Power: Malleable Realities in Manuel Puig‘s Use of Folklore and Cinematic Sources in Kiss of the Spider Woman." Cincinnati Romance Review (1992)
- Ellen Stekert, "Folk Song and Folk Music" in Encyclopedia of American Social History (Scribner, 1993)
- Ellen J. Stekert, "Cents and Nonsense in the Urban Folksong Movement: 1930–1966" in Transforming Tradition, ed. Neil V. Rosenberg (1993)

== Selected discography ==
Traditional American Love Songs
Review scores
Source	Rating
AllMusic	4/5 stars

=== As primary artist ===
- Ellen Stekert, Ozark Mountain Folk Songs Volume One (Stinson Records, c. 1955)
- Ellen Stekert, Ballads Of Careless Love (Cornell Recording Society, 1956)
- Milton Okun and Ellen Stekert, Traditional American Love Songs (Riverside Records, 1957)
- Ellen Stekert, Songs Of A New York Lumberjack (Folkways Records, 1958)
- Ellen Stekert, Go Round Songs, Vol. 1 (2025)
- Ellen Stekert, Jean Ritchie, Oscar Brand, Dave Sear, and the New Lost City Ramblers, Camera Three (2025)

=== Compilations and other appearances ===
- Various Artists, Everybody Sing! American Folk Songs Specially Selected For Children, Volume 1: Songs For Cubs (Riverside Records, c. 1957): Milton Okun and Ellen Stekert, "Paper of Pins/Jenny Jenkins"
- Various Artists, Everybody Sing! American Folk Songs Specially Selected For Children, Volume 2: Songs For Juniors (Riverside Records, c. 1957): Milton Okun and Ellen Stekert, "River Brazos/Shule Aroon"
- Various Artists, Everybody Sing! American Folk Songs Specially Selected For Children, Volume 3: Songs For Seniors (Riverside Records, c. 1957): Milton Okun and Ellen Stekert, "Must I Go Bound; The Cambric Shirt"
- Various Artists, Our Singing Heritage Volume I (Elektra, 1958): "The House Carpenter" and "Froggie went A-Courting"
- Various Artists, Songs Of The Civil War (Folkways Records, 1963): "The Cumberland And The Merrimac" and "Pat Murphy Of The Irish Brigade"
- Sarah Ogan Gunning, Girl Of Constant Sorrow (Folk-Legacy Records, 1965)
- Various Artists, O Love Is Teasin' (Anglo-American Mountain Balladry) (Elektra, 1984): "Froggie went A-Courting"
- Various Artists, The Riverside Folklore Series Volume Three: Singing the New Traditions: Songs, Singers, and Instrumentalists of the Folk Revival (Riverside Records, 1996): Milt Okun and Ellen Stekert, "The Cambric Shirt (Child #2)", "Must I Go Bound", "The Brazos River", "Trouble"
- Various Artists, Constant Sorrow (Gems From The Elektra Vaults) (One Day Music, 2014): "Froggie went A-Courting"
- Various Artists, Classic English And Scottish Ballads From Smithsonian Folkways (Smithsonian Folkways, 2017): "The Two Sisters (Child No. 10)"
