= Karen L. Gould =

9th President of Brooklyn College
- In office August 1, 2009 – July 31, 2016
- Preceded by: Christoph Kimmich
- Succeeded by: Michelle Anderson

Personal details
- Born: June 17, 1948 San Francisco, California, U.S.
- Education: Sorbonne University (GrDip); Occidental College (BA); University of Oregon (PhD)
- Awards: Governor General’s Award for Canadian Studies (2003); Donner Medal in Canadian Studies (2005)

Karen L. Gould (born June 17, 1948) is a scholar of French-Canadian literature, and an academic administrator who has been a dean at Old Dominion University and the University of Cincinnati, provost and senior vice president at California State University, Long Beach, and the ninth president of Brooklyn College, the first woman to hold that position.

== Early life and education ==
Gould was born in San Francisco, California, in 1948. She spent her junior year of high school as an exchange student in Southern France, the foundation of her interest in French culture and literature. She received a diploma from the Sorbonne in 1969, a B.A. degree in French from Occidental College in 1970, and a Ph.D. in Romance Languages from the University of Oregon in 1975. While her dissertation and early research focused on native French writers, she was among a small group in the 1970s who recognized the legitimacy, importance, and relevance of looking critically at the francophone periphery, literature produced in the French language outside France.

== Academic career ==
Gould began her teaching career at Bucknell University in 1973. She also taught at Virginia Polytechnic University from 1980 to 1985, and Bowling Green State University from 1985 to 1996. She served as dean of the College of Arts and Letters at Old Dominion University from 1996 to 2001, dean of the McMicken College of Arts and Sciences at the University of Cincinnati from 2001 to 2007, provost and senior vice president for academic affairs at California State University, Long Beach from 2007 to 2009. She was named the ninth president of Brooklyn College (a campus of the City University of New York) in June 2009.

Gould has written or co-edited six books and over 50 articles on contemporary Quebec literature, francophone women writers, and the modern French novel. Beginning her scholarly work with a book on French novelist Claude Simon, she shifted her attention to Québec women writers in the 1980s. Using feminist theory, she explained difficult experimental texts in clear and accessible language. She has interpreted feminist poetry and prose in the context of Québec intellectual history. In journal articles and book chapters Gould has discussed such writers as Louky Bersianik, Marie-Claire Blais, Nicole Brossard, Madeleine Gagnon, Anne Hébert, Suzanne Lamy, Monique LaRue, Madeleine Monette, France Théoret, Élise Turcotte, and Ying Chen.

She was awarded the Governor General's Award for Canadian Studies in 2003, and the Donner Medal in Canadian Studies in 2005. She is a former editor of the journal Québec Studies. She has served as president of the International Council for Canadian Studies, and president of the American Association for Canadian Studies.

== Books authored ==
- Gould, Karen (1979). Claude Simon's mythic muse. Columbia, South Carolina: French Literature Publications Co. ISBN 9780917786105.
- Gould, Karen; Birn, Randi (1981). Orion blinded: essays on Claude Simon. Lewisburg, Pennsylvania London: Bucknell University Press Associated University Presses. ISBN 9780838724200.
- Gould, Karen (1990). Writing in the feminine: feminism and experimental writing in Quebec. Carbondale: Southern Illinois University Press. ISBN 9780809315826.
- Gould, Karen; Metcalfe, William; Jockel, Joseph (1993). Northern exposures: scholarship on Canada in the United States. Washington, DC: Association for Canadian Studies in the United States. ISBN 9781883027001.
- Gould, Karen; Green, Mary; Rice-Maximin, Micheline; Walker, Keith; Yeager, Jack (1996). Postcolonial subjects: francophone women writers. Minneapolis, Minnesota: University of Minnesota Press. ISBN 9780816626298.
- Gould, Karen; Gaffield, Chad (2003). The Canadian distinctiveness into the XXIst century. Ottawa, Ontario: University of Ottawa Press. ISBN 9780776605517.

== Notes ==
Preceded by Christoph M. Kimmich	President of Brooklyn College; 2009–2016	Succeeded by Michelle Anderson
