= Madeleine Monette =

American poet

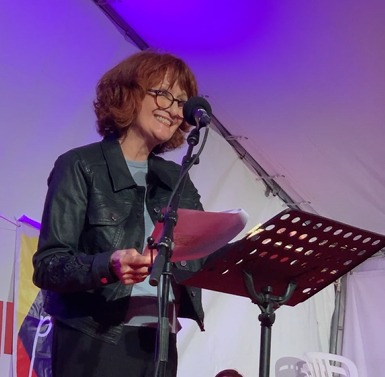
- Madeleine Monette in 2007
- Born: Montreal
- Occupations: Fiction writer and poet
- Writing career
- Language: French, English
- Genres: Novels, short-stories and poetry
- Notable works: Le Double suspect (Doubly Suspect); La Femme furieuse Ciel à outrances/Lashing Skies
- Notable awards: Robert-Cliche Award, Fondation Gabrielle-Roy Award, member of the Académie des lettres du Québec
- Website: www.madeleinemonette.com

Madeleine Monette is a Canadian novelist, short story writer, and poet from Quebec.

== Biography ==
Born in Montreal, she has lived in New York City since 1979. After her first novel, Le Double suspect, won the Prix Robert-Cliche in 1980, she devoted herself to writing novels and short stories that combine an intimate sense of reality with an acute social consciousness, revisiting the social novel and probing at close range the notion of "Americanity", creating works that are cultural multiplexers and whose geography tends to undo the very concept of "territory", physical or imaginary. In 2007, she turned to poetry as another way to explore our subjective and physical relationship to the present world, while keeping a close eye on social reality and the historical moment. Her poems, which channel the sensuality of her novelistic writings, reconsider and renew the art of the narrative, combining fiction and poetry in a singular way. Since the early 1980s, Monette also contributed to promote Quebec and francophone literature in the United States and Europe, and as far as New Caledonia in the South Pacific. She was received into the Académie des lettres du Québec (Québec Academy of Letters) in 2007.

== Literary career ==
Monette has published several novels: Le Double suspect (1980, Robert-Cliche Award), Petites Violences (1982), Amandes et melon (1991), La Femme furieuse (1997) and Les Rouleurs (2007). In 2000, Le Double suspect came out in English under the title Doubly Suspect. Her first book of poetry, Ciel à outrances, appeared in 2013. It was translated into English in 2014 under the title Lashing Skies. Her novel Les Rouleurs was published in 2015 by Galaade Editions in Paris, under the title Skatepark.

Over the years, many of her texts were read on the radio and published in short-story collections such as Histoires de livres, Lignes de métro, Nouvelles d'Amérique, Nouvelles de Montréal, Plages; others, including poems, appeared in literary publications such as Arcade, Code-Barres, Écrits du Canada français, Écrits, Estuaire, Exit, Liberté, Moebius, Nuit blanche, Possibles, Québec français, Le Sabord, Trois and XYZ (in Québec), Tessera and Virages (in English Canada), Americas' Society Review, Beacons, Women in French Studies, and Romance Language Annual (in the United States), Europe, Sud and Riveneuve-Continents (in France), and L'Immaginazione (in Italy).

Monette was writer in residence at the Université du Québec à Montréal in 1993–1994. In 2007, she was writer in residence at the Château de Lavigny International Writers' Residence in Switzerland, with the support of the Ledig-Rowohlt Foundation. In 2007–2008, she was a member of the jury of the Canada-Japan Award and of the Prix Ringuet du roman de l'Académie des lettres du Québec. In 2008–2009, she reviewed American novels on Première Chaîne's Vous m'en lirez tant. Since 2009, as a member of the Académie des lettres du Québec, she is a co-organizer of the annual Quebec session of Femmes-Monde à La Coupole in Paris.

Since 1983, she has toured, given lectures and public readings, taken part in festivals of literature, book fairs, conferences and international meetings of writers in North America, Europe, the Caribbean, and New Caledonia in the South Pacific.

== Awards and acknowledgements ==
Winner of the Robert-Cliche Award in 1980 for her first novel, Le Double suspect, she was also short-listed for literary awards such as the Marguerite Yourcenar Award (United States), the Prix France-Québec Philippe-Rossillon (France), the Prix Molson and Prix Ringuet de l'Académie des Lettres du Québec and the Prix Elle Québec (Canada). She was awarded the first Gabrielle-Roy Writing Grant in 1994, which allowed her to live in Roy's summer house on the St. Lawrence River.

Monette was featured in the literary magazine Lettres québécoises in 2009. Many studies, essays, and theses on her work appeared in North America and in Europe, including a collective entitled Relectures de Madeleine Monette (Summa Publications, Alabama, USA, 1999). Thus, recently, an in-depth interview entitled "La Vigilance du roman", together with an essay on Petites Violences and Les Rouleurs, was published in France, by Editions de la Transparence, in La violence au féminin.

== Affiliations ==
She is a member of the P.E.N. American Center of New York, the Centre québécois du P.E.N. international and the Union des écrivaines et écrivains québécois (UNEQ).

In 2007, she was received into the Académie des lettres du Québec.

== Honors ==
- Robert-Cliche Award (1980)
- Gabrielle Roy Writing Grant (1994)
- Writer in Residence at UQAM – Université du Québec à Montréal (1994)
- Member of the Académie des lettres du Québec (2007)

== Selected works ==
=== Poetry ===
- Ciel à outrances, Editions l'Hexagone, Collection Écritures, Montréal, 2013, 112 p.
- Lashing Skies, a translation of Ciel à outrances by Phyllis Aronoff and Howard Scott, Ekstasis Editions, Victoria, Canada, 2014, 104 p.

=== Novels ===
- Skatepark, Galaade Editions, Paris, 2015, 480 p. (First published as Les Rouleurs in 2007.)
- Les Rouleurs, Hurtubise HMH, Coll. L'arbre, Montréal, 2007.
- La Femme furieuse, l'Hexagone, Montréal, 1997, 336 p. Second and third printings 1998–2000. Short-listed for the Marguerite Yourcenar Award in the US, the Elle Québec Readers Award, the Philippe-Rossillon France/Québec Award and the Prix Ringuet de l'Académie des lettres du Québec.
- Amandes et melon, l'Hexagone, Montreal, 1991. 466 p. Short-listed for the Académie des lettres québécoises Award and the Edgar-Lespérance Award. Mass market edition, Typo, Montreal, 1997, 585 p.
- Amandes et melon, Livres Parlés Daisy (Daisy Spoken Books) on CD, Bibliothèque d'Inca, narration by Madeleine Arsenault, 2005. (FD02193)
- Petites Violences, Quinze, Montreal, 1982, 242 p. Mass market edition, Typo, Montreal, 1994, 241 p.
- Le Double suspect, Quinze, Montreal, 1980, 241 p. Robert-Cliche Award. Mass market editions, les Quinze, Coll. 10/10, Montreal, 1988 and 1991. 2nd mass market edition, Typo, Montreal, 1996, 228 p.
- Doubly Suspect, transl. by Luise von Flotow, Guernica Editions, Toronto, 2000, 144 p.

=== Short stories/poems/excerpts ===
- "Il latte del cielo", suite poétique tirée de Ciel à outrances, trad. de Maria Teresa Carbone, in L'Immaginazione, no. 287, Italie, mai-juin 2015, p. 46.
- "Zach e Juliette", extrait de La femme furieuse, trad. de Maria Teresa Carbone, in L'Immaginazione, no. 287, Italie, mai-juin 2015, p. 44-46.
- "Le lait du ciel" poem from Ciel à outrances, in Intranqu'îllités, Editions Passager des vents, Paris, 2015, p. 86.
- "C'est cela mourir" (excerpt from a novel in progress) in Les écrits n° 142, March 2015, p. 107-113.
- "Le plein de la bouche", poem from Ciel à outrances, in Intranqu'îllités, n° 3, Haïti, 2014, p. 186-187.
- "Le lait du ciel", poem from Ciel à outrances, in Intranqu'îllités, n° 2, Haïti, May 2013, p. 150-151.
- "The Grace of a Flock of Birds", first chapter of Les Rouleurs in Cincinnati Romance Review, Vol. 36, Fall 2013, p. 17-22. Translated into English by prof. Emmanuelle Ertel and her students, Master's degree in Literary Translation, Fall 2011, New York University, New York.
- "Petite" / "Little", French and English versions of poem from Ciel à outrances, in Cincinnati Romance Review, Vol. 36, Fall 2013, p. 1-16. Translated into English by Phyllis Aronoff and Howard Scott.
- "Le lait du ciel", poem from Ciel à outrances, in Intranqu'îllités, n° 2, Haiti, p. 150-151.
- "Les oiseaux rameurs" (poem), Montréal, Estuaire, Editions de l'Hexagone 60th anniversary special issue, March 2013.
- "La mer, au feu" (poem), Montreal, Mœbius, June 2013.
- "Les déliés et les pleins" (poem), in Les écrits (Hommage à Jean-Guy Pilon), n° 134, Montreal, p. 148-150, 2012.
- "Petite" (poem), in Estuaire, n° 148, Montreal, p. 43-50, 2012.
- "Le corps panique" (poem), in Exit, revue de poésie, n° 64, Montreal, 2011, p. 23-31.
- "Lalabad" (short story), in Riveneuve Continents, nº 11, Paris, 2010, p. 164-171. And in "Réinventer le 11 septembre", Mœbius, n˚ 130, Montreal, 2011, p. 67-73.
- "NaturaliZation", in Histoires de livres, Editions Hurtubise HMH, Montreal, 2010, p 201-220.
- "Élan vital", in Exit revue de poésie, n° 54, Montréal, March 2009,
- "Élan vital", in Moebius, edited by L. Langevin, n°116, spring 2008, p. 115-118.
- "Qui l'aurait cru?", in XYZ, n° 94, edited by Gaëtan Brulotte, n˚ 94, summer 2008, p. 9-13.
- "Les Houles hurlantes", in Women in French Studies, USA, 2003, p. 21-25.
- "Money", translated by Jane Brierley, in Women in French Studies, USA, 2003, p. 26-27.
- "A Strange Power", transl. Lydia Davis, in Review (A Publication of Americas Society), New York, 2003, p. 97-91.
- "L'Heure grise", in Nouvelles du métro, Ed. l'Hexagone/VLB, collection of short stories edited by D. Fournier, 2002.
- "Un argument intime", in Arcade, Montréal, n° 56, p. 23-25.
- "L'urgence du calme" (portrait of the poet Denise Desautels), in L'autre portrait, Edition d'art Le Sabord, Trois-Rivières, 2002, 85 p.
- "Pégase! À pleins gaz!", in Moebius, Montréal, n° 90, summer 2001, p. 121-128.
- "Le Cycliste, in Arcade, Montréal, n° 48, p. 30-34.
- "La Baigneuse de nuit", in Les Écrits, Montréal, n° 99, August 2000, p. 21-24.
- "Les Ruines de l'enfance", in Arcade, Montréal, n°47, 1999, p. 45-48.
- "La Fusée blanche", in Virages, Toronto, n° 6, summer 1999, p. 11-13
- "Un autre vertige encore", in Nouvelles d'Amérique, Editions de l'Hexagone, 1998, 178 p.
- "Un battement de rideaux", in Les Écrits, Montréal, n° 94, 1998, p. 19-35.
- "L'Arrivée", in Les Écrits, Montréal, n° 87, 1996, p. 85-101.
- "…Il était un monde", in Liberté 227, Montréal, Vol. 37, n° 5, Oct. 1996, p. 30-40.
- "L'Argent", in Tessera, Toronto, vol. 16, Summer 1994, p. 81-83.
- "Une salsa", in Les Écrits, Montréal, n° 81, 1994, p.-69-75
- "Noises", transl. by George Newman, in Beacons, USA, 1993.
- "L'Ami de lettres" in Nouvelles de Montréal, Editions de l'Hexagone, Montreal, 1992, 249 p.
- "Un pouvoir étrange", in Possibles, Montréal, vol.14, n°3, summer 1990, p. 149-157.
- "Le caisson de livraison", in Ouvrez l'œil sur le policier, Agenda littéraire, Foire du livre de Lanaudière, 1989
- "La Plage", in SUD, Nos. 78-79, France, 1988, pp. 155–172.
- "Petite Famille, Petites Morts", in Trois, Montréal, vol. 3 n° 3, 1988, p. 155-157.
- "Bruits", in Trois, Vol. 3, n°1, Montreal, 1987, pp. 37–40.
- "Le Maillot" in l'Aventure, la mésaventure, les Quinze, Montreal, 1987, 159 p.
- "Le Maillot", excerpt in Possibles, Montréal, vol. 8, n° 4, Summer 1984, p. 99-103,
- "La Plage" in Plages, Editions Québec/Amérique, edited by M. Monette, Montreal, 1986, 130 p.
- "Caro Mimmo...", in Moebius, Montreal, n° 29, Summer 1986, pp. 51–56.
- "L'Américain et la jarretière" in Fuites et Poursuites, Les Quinze, Montreal, 1982, 200 p. (Paperback edition, les Quinze, Coll. 10/10, Montreal, 1985, 219 p.)
- "Après vingt ans, un tressaillement, comme un tremblement d'être", in Arcade, Montréal, n° 10, Oct. 1985, p. 34-36; and in Anthologie Arcade, Montréal, 1996, n°35-36, p. 49-51.
- "Formes", in Québec français, Québec, Dec. 1983, n° 52, p. 39.

=== Essays ===
- Sans coupe-feux", presentation of playwright Carole Fréchette for her induction into the Académie des lettres du Québec, October 5, 2016. To be published in Carole Fréchette: un théâtre sur le qui-vive, ed. by Gilbert David (Éditions Nota bene).
- "Ce poète-là, une troisième personne" in Les écrits n° 142, March 2015, p. 114-116.
- "La vigilance du roman" (interview) in La violence au féminin, ed. by Claude Benoît, Éditions de la transparence, Paris, 2011.
- "Je vous écrirai aussi du Pacifique" (presented at the 2009 Annual Conference of the Académie des lettres du Québec) in Les Métropoles culturelles dans l'espace francophone, Hurtubise, Coll. Constantes, Montréal, 176 p.
- "Celle des romans" " self-portrait, in Lettres québécoises, Montréal, n° 133, 2009, p.7-8; in Code-Barres, n° 1, Montréal, 2010.
- Madeleine Monette : québécoise à New York ou s'éloigner pour mieux se rapprocher", interview by Hugues Corriveau, in Lettres québécoises, Montréal, n° 133, 2009, p. 12-13.
- "Liens et balises" (induction speech, Académie des Lettres du Québec), in Les Ecrits, n˚121, Montréal, 2007, p. 39-50.
- "La fragilité de sa démesure" (Inaugural Speech, XXXIst Rencontre québécoise internationale des écrivains on the theme of New York City ), in Québec français, n° 130, 2003, p. 43-44; in Les écrits, Montréal, n° 108, 2003, p. 9-23; in L'Annuaire du Québec 2004, Fides, Montréal. 2003, p. 936-944.
- "Une île, un monde" (presented at the AATF Congress in Lyon in 1996 and at the APFFA Congress in New York in 1998), in Relectures de Madeleine Monette, ed. by J. Ricouart, Summa Publishing, USA, 1999, 242 p.
- "Un roman sur la planche, un corps à aimer", (presented at the XXVth Rencontre québécoise internationale des écrivains on the theme "Ecrire l'amour, encore..."), in Liberté, n° 232, Montréal, 1997.
- "Plaque tournante" (presented at the 1995 Rencontre québécoise internationale des écrivains on the theme of "The writer and the city", in Possibles, Montreal, 1996.
- "La tentation du désordre", in le Double suspect, Les Quinze, Coll. 10/10, Montreal, 1988 and 1991, p. 267, and Typo, Montreal, 1996, p. 213.
- "Vivre ailleurs pour écrire", in Nuit blanche, n° 28, May–June 1987, p. 42.
- "Les Nouvellistes réfléchissent sur la nouvelle", in Québec français, n° 66, May 1987, pp. 66–69.
- "Détournements" (presented at the 1985 Annual Conference of the French-Canadian Academy), in Ecrits du Canada français, Montreal, n° 58, 1986, p. 94 103.
- "Auto portrait", in Québec français, n° 52, 1983, p. 38.

=== Translations ===
- « Au fond » and « Dynamique d'organisation galactique » by Saul Williams, in Intranqu'îllités, n° 3, Haïti, 2014, p. 184-185.
- "Le dessin en tant qu'éros et mémoire" by S. Kwinter, in Betty Goodwin, Steel Notes, Essays in coll., National Gallery of Canada, 1989, 151 p.
- "Au jeu" by William Wood, catalog of the Will Gorlitz exhibition at the 49th Parallel, New York, 1987, 32. p.
- Art catalogues for the 49th Parallel in 'New York and the Canadian Embassy Art Gallery in Washington (1987-1991).

== Sources ==
- Gould, Karen, "Translating 'America' in Madeleine Monette's Petites Violences", in Textual Studies/Etudes textuelles au Canada, n° 5, 1994.
- Gould, Karen "Rewriting 'America': Violence, Postmodernity, and Parody in the Fiction of Madeleine Monette, Nicole Brossard and Monique LaRue" in Postcolonial Subjects (Francophone Women Writers), University of Minnesota Press, 1996.
- Gould, Karen, "Madeleine Monette, 'Otherness', and Cultural Criticism", in Women by Women, edited by Roseanna Lewis Dussault, Fairleigh Dickinson University Press, 1997, p. 241–251.
- Hill, Sydney Margaret, "She must write her self": Feminist poetics of deconstruction and inscription (six Canadian women writing), Carleton University (Canada), 1998, 121 p.
- Ireland, Susan, "The Reader as Writer in Madeleine Monette's Le Double suspect", in Continental, Latin-American and Francophone Women Writers, ed. by G. Adamson and E. Myers, vol. IV, University Press of America, Maryland, 1997, pp. 269–276.
- Raoul, Valérie, "Gender Confusion and Self-Generation 1960–1990", in Distinctly Narcissistic, Diary Fiction in Quebec, Toronto, University of Toronto Press, 1996.
- Cannon, Margaret, Review of Doubly Suspect, The Globe and Mail, Toronto, 28 April 2001
- Stos, C. "Madeleine Monette. Doubly Suspect." Canadian Book Review Annual, July 2001, p. 156.
- Joubert, Lucie, "Monette(s)", Spirale, Nov./Dec., 1997, p. 28.
