= Harold William Thompson =

American 18th century English literature scholar

Harold William "Tommy" Thompson (1891–1964) was an American folklorist and historian. He was also a competent musician, specialising in playing the organ.

== Early life and education ==
Thompson was born in Buffalo, New York in 1891. After graduating from Westfield College in 1908, he graduated with a B.Phil. from Hamilton College in 1912. Thompson then studied at Harvard University, gaining a M.A (1913) a Ph.D. (1915). At Harvard, he studied under George Kitteridge, "one of the key figures in the development of folklore as an academic discipline in the United States".

In 1923, he won a Guggenheim Fellowship - one of the first fifteen educators to do so - allowing him further postgraduate study at Edinburgh University.

== Career ==
Thompson was trained as a literary scholar and his early research was focused on Henry Mackenzie, a Scottish lawyer and writer. Over time, his interest and then research grew into folklore and history.

In 1915 Thompson started lecturing in English at University of New York State Teachers College. In 1940 he joined Cornell University as a Lecturer in English and became Professor of English in 1951.

From 1936 to 1939 he corresponded with Ezra Pound. Both Thompson and Pound were graduates of Hamilton College.

== Folklore ==
As a teacher, Thompson was one of the first American Folklorists to send students out to collect lore in their local environs. Folklore collected in New York State by over eighty students formed the basis of the book Body, Books and Britches (1939), published in Thompson's name but with his students prominently cited. It has been noted that most of the students who contributed to Body, Books and Britches, were young women training to be teachers. Thompson's students at New York State included Pete Seeger and K. Leroy Irvis.

The archive material of Thompson's collaborations with over 1,6000 of his students, was donated to the New York State Historical Society and the New York Folklore Society.

During the 1930s, Thompson had a weekly radio broadcast on WGY in Schenectady, New York. He usually talked about the traditions of rural, white, Protestant people, but occasionally gave broadcasts on "Irish, Jewish, Italian and African American traditions".

Thompson's folklore classes at Cornell involved "singing, dancing, listening and reciting" and introducing students to a wide range of tales and music. Over time, it featured live performances by Woody Guthrie, Lead Belly and Thompson's former student Pete Seeger. Thompson's undergraduate teaching assistants included Peter Yarrow and Ellen Stekert.

In 1944, with Louis C. Jones Thompson founded the New York Folklore Society. Thompson served as the Society's President for many years and also edited The New York Folk Quarterly.

Thompson aimed to popularise folklore and make it accessible to a nonacademic audience. However, he did receive criticism from some folklorists for his popularist tendencies.

== Later years ==
Thompson retired in 1959, living his final years in Homer, New York. He worked in his later years on a book on African American folklore, which was never finished in his lifetime.

He died at Cortland Memorial Hospital in New York State on 21 February 1964.

== Family ==
His wife was Professor of English at New York State University.

== Honours ==
In 1932 he was elected a Fellow of the Royal Society of Edinburgh. His proposers were William Metzler, John Alexander Inglis, Robert Hannay and Charles Galton Darwin. Elected as an Ordinary Fellow rather than Foreign or Honorary Fellow, this indicates his physical presence in Edinburgh at that time.

Thompson served as a President of the American Folklore Society in 1942.

== Selected publications ==
- Lincoln, Abraham, Hastings, Harry W; Thompson, Harold W (1921). Selections from the works of Abraham Lincoln. New York: Ambrose & Co. OCLC 934140753.
- Mackenzie, Henry; Thompson, Harold William (1927). Anecdotes and egotisms, now first published. Edited with an introd. by Harold William Thompson. London: Oxford University Press. OCLC 223371985.
- Thompson, Harold William (1984). A Scottish man of feeling; some account of Henry Mackenzie, of Edinburgh, and of the golden age of Burns and Scott,. London; New York: Oxford University Press. OCLC 248855993.
- Thompson, Harold William (1939). Body, boots & britches: folktales, ballads and speech from Country New York. N.Y., N.Y.: Dover Publications. OCLC 220737709.
- Thompson, Harold William (1958). A pioneer songster; texts from the Stevens-Douglass manuscript of western New York, 1841-1856., Ithaca, N.Y.: Cornell University Press, 1958, OCLC 918778, retrieved 2022-03-05
- Thompson, Harold William (1962). New York State folktales, legends and ballads. New York: Dover Publications. OCLC 33089992.
