= Reine-Aimée Côté =

Canadian writer (born 1948)

Reine-Aimée Côté (born November 20, 1948) is a Canadian writer living in the Saguenay–Lac-Saint-Jean region of Quebec.

She was born in Villebois and earned a bachelor's degree in literary studies from the Université du Québec à Chicoutimi. Côté taught school at the primary and secondary levels in Alma for 35 years; from 1998 to 1999, she was advisor for French education at the junior high level. She retired from teaching in 2002.

In 1991, she won two first prizes at the annual creative writing contest sponsored by La Bonante. Her first novel Les Bruits received the Prix Robert-Cliche in 2004 and the Prix littéraire Abitibi-Consolidated the following year. Les Bruits was also a finalist for the Prix Anne-Hébert. Côté published her second novel L'échappée des dieux in 2009, which received honourable mention at the Salon du livre du Saguenay-Lac-Saint-Jean.

== Selected works ==
- Le bal des miséreux, stories (1996)
- Haillons de lune, poetry (1997)
