= Robert Hess (college president) =

American historian and academic administrator (1932–1992)

6th President of Brooklyn College
- In office 1979–1992
- Preceded by: John Kneller
- Succeeded by: Vernon Lattin

Personal details
- Born: Robert Lee Hess; December 18, 1932 Asbury Park, New Jersey, US
- Died: January 12, 1992 (aged 59) New York City, US
- Spouse: Frances Aaron (m. 1960)
- Children: 4
- Education: Yale University (BA, MA, PhD)

Robert Lee Hess (December 18, 1932 – January 12, 1992) was an American scholar of African history, and the sixth president of Brooklyn College.

== Personal life ==
Hess was born in Asbury Park, New Jersey, to Henry and Ada (Davis) Hess. He attended Yale University, where he earned his B.A. (1954, magna cum laude), M.A. (1955), and Ph.D. (1960) degrees, studying African history.

He was a resident of Brooklyn. Hess was married to Frances H. Aaron in 1960, and had four children.

Hess died on January 12, 1992, in Mt. Sinai Medical Center in New York, of lymphoma.

== Academic career ==
Hess taught from 1958 to 1961 at Carnegie Institute of Technology, from 1961 to 1962 and 1963 to 1964 at Mount Holyoke College, from 1962 to 1963 at Boston University, and from 1961 to 1964 at Northwestern University.

From 1966 to 1979, he taught history at the University of Illinois at Chicago. In 1966, he was appointed an associate professor and promoted to full professor in 1971. At Chicago he served as dean of Liberal Arts and Sciences, and, beginning in 1972 Associate Vice Chancellor for Academic Affairs.

Hess was the sixth president of Brooklyn College, from 1979 until 1992. In a 1988 survey of thousands of academic deans, the college ranked 5th in the United States in providing students with a strong general education. Brooklyn College was the only college in the top five in the survey that was a public institution. While Brooklyn College was referred to as "the poor man’s Harvard," Hess quipped: "I like to think of Harvard as the rich man's Brooklyn College."

The Robert L. Hess Scholar-in-Residence Program was established by Brooklyn College, and is supported by the Robert L. Hess Fund. Scholars in residence have included Vartan Gregorian, James S. Langer, Daniel Miller, Robin D. G. Kelley, Agnieszka Holland, Marc Shell, Sean Wilentz, Thomas Frank, and Edwidge Danticat.

Hess wrote several books and many articles on 19th-century Africa, the Horn of Africa, and colonialism. Among them were Ethiopia: the Modernization of Autocracy (considered by Choice: Current Reviews for Academic Libraries to be one of the ten best books on Africa), A bibliography of the primary sources for nineteenth century tropical African history, as recorded by explorers, missionaries, traders, travelers, administrators, military men, and adventurers (1965), Italian Colonialism in Somalia (1966), Patrick Gilkes, the Dying Lion: Feudalism and Modernization in Ethiopia (1977), and Ethiopia and the Horn of Africa (1978).

== Honors ==
He received a Fulbright Fellowship (1956–1958 at the University of Rome in Italy) and a Guggenheim Fellowship (1968–69).

Preceded by John Kneller	President of Brooklyn College; 1979–1992	Succeeded by Vernon Lattin
