= Danielle Trussart =

Quebec writer and painter (born 1948)

Danielle Trussart (born December 3, 1948) is a visual artist and writer living in Quebec, Canada.

She was born in Montreal, Quebec. Trussart received her teaching certificate from the École normale Jacques-Cartier and went on to study Quebec studies, adult education and special education at the Université de Montréal and the Université du Québec à Montréal. She co-founded an alternative school at Saint-Jérôme and taught at an alternative school in Sainte-Thérèse. She also took workshops in visual arts. Since 1993, she has lived at Baie-Saint-Paul where she operated an inn.

Trussart established a small publishing house to distribute her own illustrations of Quebec folk songs. She exhibits her art in Baie-Saint-Paul and Sainte-Thérèse. She was co-author of a collection of books for children. Trussart has contributed to the literary journals Arcade, Brèves littéraires and L'embarcadère. Her 2008 novel Le train pour Samarcande received the Prix Robert-Cliche.

She received honourable mention in 2005 for a Prix Brèves littéraires and was awarded that prize in 2007. In 2006, Trussart was a finalist in the literary competition sponsored by Radio-Canada.
