= John Kneller =

English-American academic administrator

John William Kneller

5th President of Brooklyn College
- In office 1969–1979
- Preceded by: Harold Syrett
- Succeeded by: Robert Hess

Personal details
- Born: October 15, 1916; Oldham, England
- Died: July 2, 2009 (aged 92); Westport, New York, U.S.
- Citizenship: British, American
- Spouse: Alice Bowerman Hart
- Children: 1
- Education: Clark University (BA); Yale University (MA, PhD)
- Awards: Commandeur in the Ordre des Palmes Academiques

John William Kneller, OAP (October 15, 1916 – July 2, 2009) was an English-American French language professor and scholar, and the fifth President of Brooklyn College.

== Biography ==
Kneller was born in Oldham, England, to John W. Kneller and Margaret Ann Truslove. He had four older brothers. He immigrated to Worcester, Massachusetts, when he was five years old. He later became a U.S. citizen.

He studied at Clark University (B.A.; 1938) and Yale University (M.A., 1948 and Ph.D. in French, 1950). Kneller was a Fulbright Scholar in French literature at the University of Paris in 1949-50. In June 1970 Clark University conferred upon him the degree of Doctor of Letters, Honoris Causa, "in recognition of his fine accomplishments as a teacher, scholar, and administrator and in gratitude for his wise counsel on behalf of the trustees and faculty of Clark University."

During World War II, Kneller was a translator for the United States Army Air Corps. He served at Camp Ritchie in Maryland and was part of the Military Intelligence Training Center classifying him as one of the Ritchie Boys.

Kneller taught at Oberlin College, where starting in 1950 he was a French instructor, professor, department chair, dean of the College of Arts and Sciences, and then provost.

He was the fifth President of Brooklyn College from 1969 to 1979. Kneller brought along his horse from Oberlin, and would ride it in Prospect Park. Students occupied his office at the college during a student strike after the Kent State shootings and the Cambodian Campaign in 1970. He terminated classes, but kept campus buildings open for students and faculty. A member of the Brooklyn College Fencing Team introduced streaking to the college in 1974, dashing across the Quad.

From 1979-1995 Kneller taught French literature at Hunter College and the CUNY Graduate Center. He was co-chair of the Henri Peyre Institute for the Humanities at the CUNY Graduate Center, and Managing Editor and Editor-in-Chief of the French Review. In 1999, the French government awarded him its highest rank -- Commandeur in the Ordre des Palmes Academiques (Order of Academic Palms).

He was married for 61 years to Alice Bowerman Hart. They had a daughter, Linda Hart Kneller.

Kneller died at 92 years of age on July 2, 2009, at his home in Westport, New York.
