= Gilles Jobidon =

Canadian writer

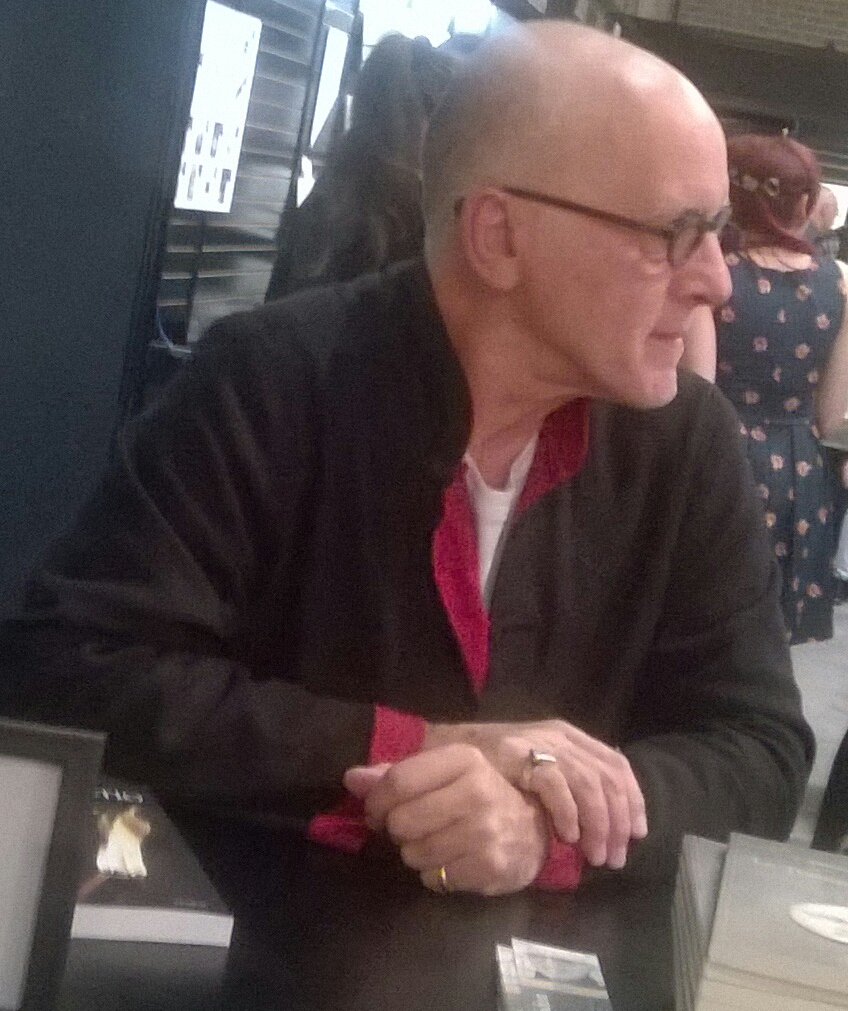
- Born: November 8, 1950 (age 75); Limoilou, Quebec, Canada
- Years active: 2000s–present

Gilles Jobidon (born November 8, 1950) is a Canadian writer from Quebec. He is most noted for his novel Le Tranquille affligé, which was the winner of the Prix des cinq continents de la francophonie in 2019.

His debut novel La route des petits matins, published in 2003, was the winner of the Prix Anne-Hébert, the Prix Robert-Cliche, and the Prix Ringuet.

== Works ==
- La Route des petits matins, 2003
- L'Âme frère, 2005
- Morphoses, 2006
- D'ailleurs, 2007
- Combustio, 2013
- La petite B., 2015
- Le Tranquille affligé, 2018
- C'est la faute à l'ostensoir, 2019
