= Paul Serge Forest =

Canadian writer

Paul Serge Forest is a Canadian Doctor and writer from Quebec, whose debut novel Tout est ori won the Prix Robert-Cliche and was shortlisted for the Governor General's Award for French-language fiction at the 2021 Governor General's Awards.

A medical doctor by profession, Forest grew up in Quebec's Côte-Nord region.

Tout est ori was selected for the 2022 edition of Le Combat des livres, where it was defended by actress Charlotte Aubin.
