= Nikolski (novel) =

2005 novel by Nicolas Dickner

Nikolski is a novel by Canadian writer Nicolas Dickner. Originally published in 2005 in French, an English edition translated by Lazer Lederhendler was published in 2008.

The original French edition was a nominee for the 2005 Governor General's Award for French fiction, won the Prix Anne-Hébert in 2006, and won the Prix littéraire des collégiens, a prize awarded by Quebecois post-secondary students, in 2006. The English translation won the 2008 Governor General's Award for French-to-English translation, and the 2010 edition of Canada Reads.

The novel's story is set in Montreal and revolves around three seemingly disconnected characters (Noah, Joyce and an unnamed narrator) whose lives eventually intersect in the city's Plateau neighbourhood. The title derives from one of the novel's recurring motifs, a broken compass which consistently points to the small village of Nikolski, Alaska instead of the Magnetic North Pole.
