= Nicolas Dickner =

Canadian novelist and short story writer

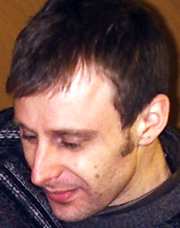
- Born: 1972 (age 53–54); Rivière-du-Loup, Quebec
- Writing career
- Language: French
- Genres: novels, short stories
- Notable work: Nikolski

Nicolas Dickner (born 1972 in Rivière-du-Loup, Quebec) is a Canadian novelist and short story writer. He is best known for his 2005 novel Nikolski, which has won numerous literary awards in Canada both in its original French and translated English editions. His books have been translated into over 10 languages.

== Education ==
Dickner studied at Laval University, where he was inspired by a course on biblical literary history. He studied art and literature during his bachelor's degree, then went on to complete a master's degree in creative writing. His master's work was published as the anthology L’Encyclopédie du petit cercle.

In 2017, Dickner completed a master's at the Université de Montréal on public sector data and its applications.

== Career ==
His first novel, Nikolski, was released in 2005 and became an instant success in Quebec. It marked a new wave of Quebec literature with appeal to an international audience and fresh ideas no longer drawing comparisons to other twentieth-century French-Canadian works.

He is published by the Quebec City-based publisher Éditions Alto, a small press founded by Antoine Tanguay who Dickner met in university.

In 2014, Dickner and Dominique Fortier published Révolutions, a collaborative project for which they each wrote a short piece each day for a year based on a word chosen from the French Republican Calendar.

He currently lives in Montreal with his family, where he is a literary columnist for the alternative weekly newspaper Voir. He also works in translation. In 2015, he finished a translation of Andrew Kaufman's Born Weird. Dickner has travelled throughout Latin America and Europe. He wrote in Bamberg for a period of time.

He has spent time as webmaster for the Union des écrivaines et des écrivains québécois (UNEQ) and as a database programmer in Peru.

== Works ==
- L'Encyclopédie du petit cercle, 2000
- Nikolski, 2005

English translation by Lazer Lederhendler published 2008.

- Traité de balistique, 2006

Written under the pen name Alexandre Bourbaki in collaboration with Bernard Wright-Laflamme.

- Tarmac, 2009

Apocalypse for Beginners, English translation by Lazer Lederhendler published 2010.

- Le Romancier portatif : 52 chroniques à emporter, 2011

A selection from Dickner's column in Voir.

- Révolutions, 2014
- Six degrés de liberté, 2015 (Six Degrees of Freedom, english translation by Lazer Lederhendler, Vintage Canada, 2017).

== Themes ==
Dickner's books often feature characters with peculiar fixations, like the end of the world in Tarmac, or shipping containers in Six degrés de liberté. He also introduces "geeky" references and features computer technology in Nikolski and Six degrés de liberté. His prose has a sense of "absurdist poetry" through his use of lists and technical asides. More than one of his characters becomes fascinated with consumer waste and either researching or reusing refuse. Travel and wanderlust are recurring topics throughout his works, as is loneliness.

Dickner uses fragmented stories and alternating perspectives to build up the narrative in his novels.

== Awards ==
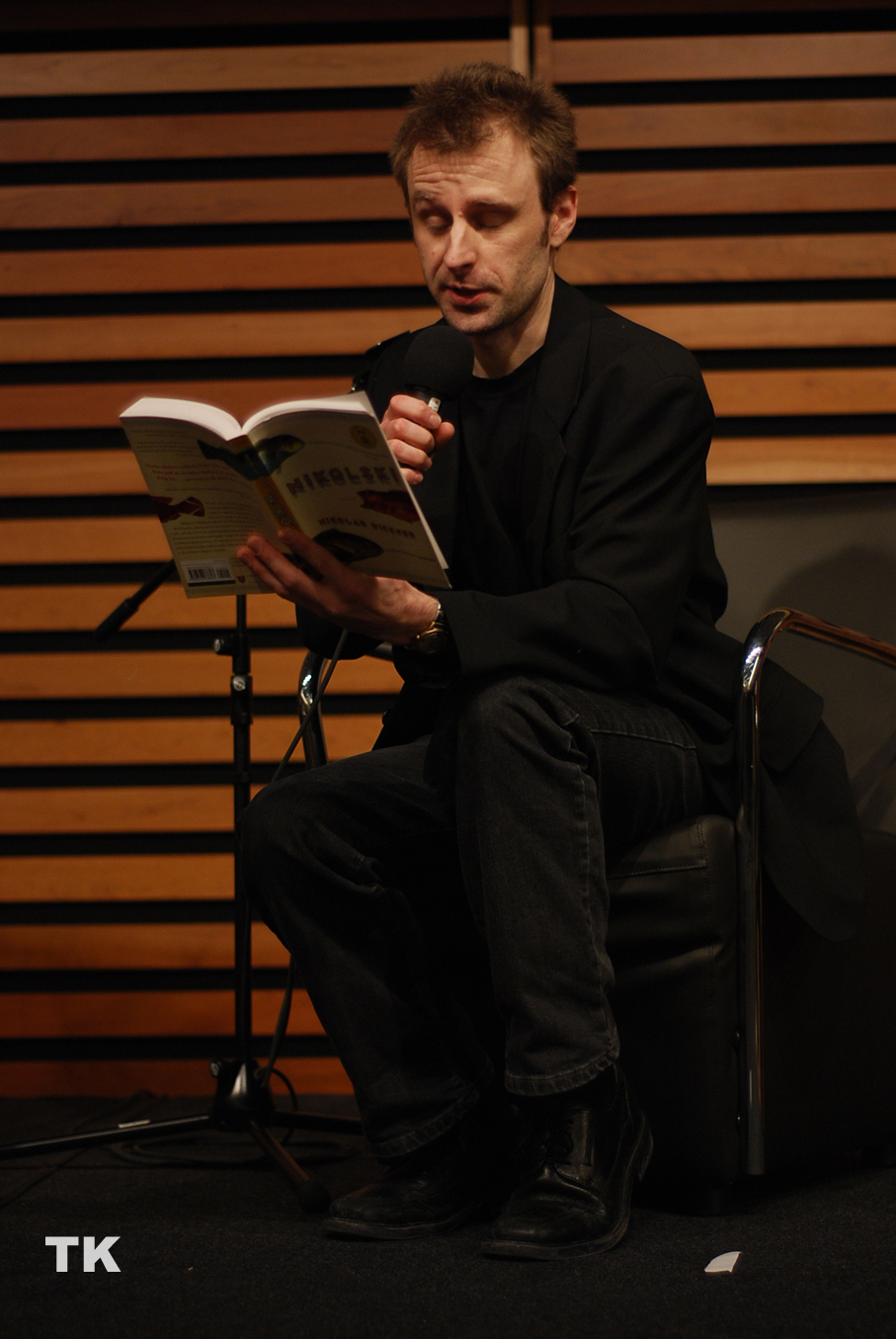
Dickner at a 2010 reading

- L'encyclopédie du petit cercle
1. 2001 - Prix littéraire Adrienne-Choquette
2. 2001 - Prix Jovette-Bernier
- Nikolski
1. 2006 - Prix des libraires
2. 2006 - Prix littéraire des collégiens
3. 2006 - Prix Anne-Hébert
4. 2006 - Prix Printemps des Lecteurs–Lavinal
5. 2008 - Governor General's Award for French to English translation
6. 2010 - Winner of Canada Reads 2010
- Six degrés de liberté
1. 2015 - Governor General's Award for Fiction (French)
