= Gabrielle Gourdeau =

Canadian writer

Gabrielle Gourdeau (1952 – July 5, 2006) was a writer in Quebec, Canada.

== Biography ==
Born in the Limoilou neighbourhood of Quebec City, Gourdeau received a PhD in French literature from the University of Toronto. She lectured in the Department of Literature at Laval University for a number of years.

In 1992, she received a fellowship grant from Laval University to assist her in writing Analyse du discours narratif, a work of literary criticism. That same year, Gourdeau published her first novel Maria Chapdelaine ou le Paradis retrouvé; despite some negative reaction from critics, it was awarded the Prix Robert-Cliche and the Prix littéraire Desjardins.

She contributed to various newspapers including La Presse, Le Devoir and Le Soleil, as well as several literary and cultural journals, notably Arcade.

Gourdeau's 2002 story "Gros Câlisse" led to a suit for defamation by a former colleague from Laval University, who claimed that a character based on him was portrayed in a derogatory fashion in that work of fiction. On the other hand, Gourdeau herself claimed that the character was not based entirely on that specific person. However, she did not deny that actions by that person may have played a part in her departure from the university.
