= Marie-Hélène Poitras =

Canadian journalist and writer (born 1975)

- Born: 1979 (age 46–47); Ottawa, Ontario, Canada
- Occupations: Novelist, journalist

Marie-Hélène Poitras (born 1975) is a Canadian writer living in Montreal, Quebec.

She was born in Ottawa, Ontario. She received a master's degree in literary studies from the Université du Québec à Montréal. Poitras is a journalist reporting on music for the magazine Voir; she also hosts a radio program for Radio-Canada.

Her first novel Soudain le Minotaure received the Prix Anne-Hébert in 2003. Her novel Griffintown received the Prix littéraire France-Québec in 2013 and was a finalist for the Prix Ringuet. Poitras published a collection of stories La mort de Mignonne et autres histoires in 2005 which was a finalist for the Prix des libraires du Québec. She also published a series for adolescents Rock & Rose in 2009. Her story "Sur la tête de Johnny Cash" received the Prix de la bande à Mœbius. Her books have been translated into English, Spanish and Italian. The English translation of Soudain le Minotaure. Suddenly the Minotaur, was shortlisted for a ReLit Award in 2007.

Poitras has also contributed to the literary journals Mœbius and Lettres québécoises.

She won the Governor General's Award for French-language fiction at the 2023 Governor General's Awards for Galumpf.
