= Judy Quinn =

Canadian writer and editor (born 1974)

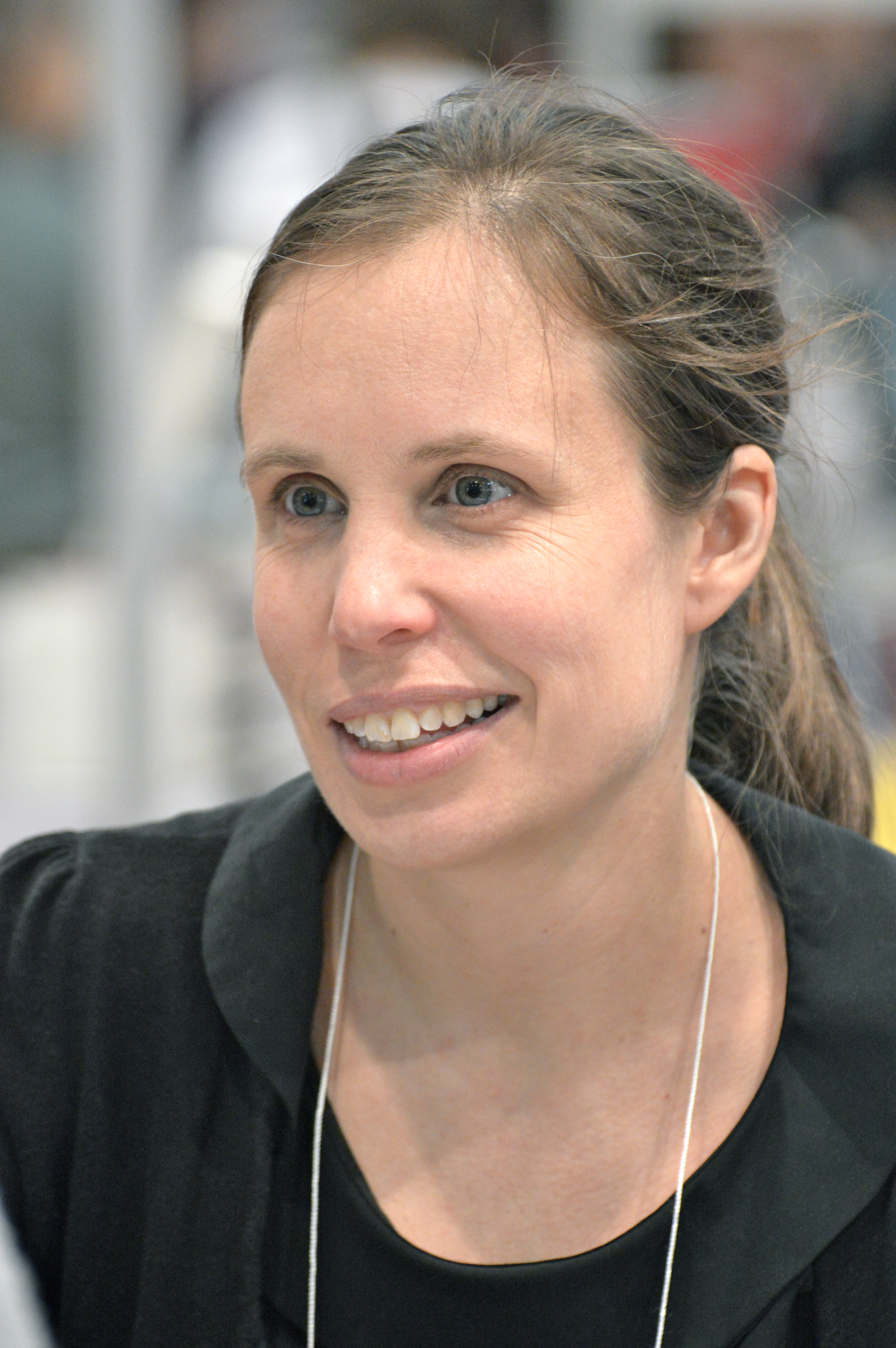
- Born: 1974 Quebec City, Quebec
- Genre: poetry, novel

Judy Quinn (born 1974) is a Canadian writer and editor living in Quebec.

== Biography ==
She was born in Quebec City and studied literature at the Université du Québec à Montréal and the Université de Toulouse-Le Mirail in France. She is literary critic and editor for the literary journal Nuit blanche. She also has contributed to various publications including Le Devoir.

Quinn published three collections of poetry: L'émondé (2008), Six heures vingt (2010) and Les damnés inflationnistes' (2012). She received the Prix littéraires Radio-Canada and the Prix Félix-Antoine-Savard for her poetry. In 2012, she published a novel Hunter s'est laissé couler which received the Prix Robert-Cliche; it was also a finalist for the Grand prix littéraire Archambault.

In 2013, she was writer in residence at the Cité internationale des arts in Paris.
