= Ryad Assani-Razaki =

Canadian author

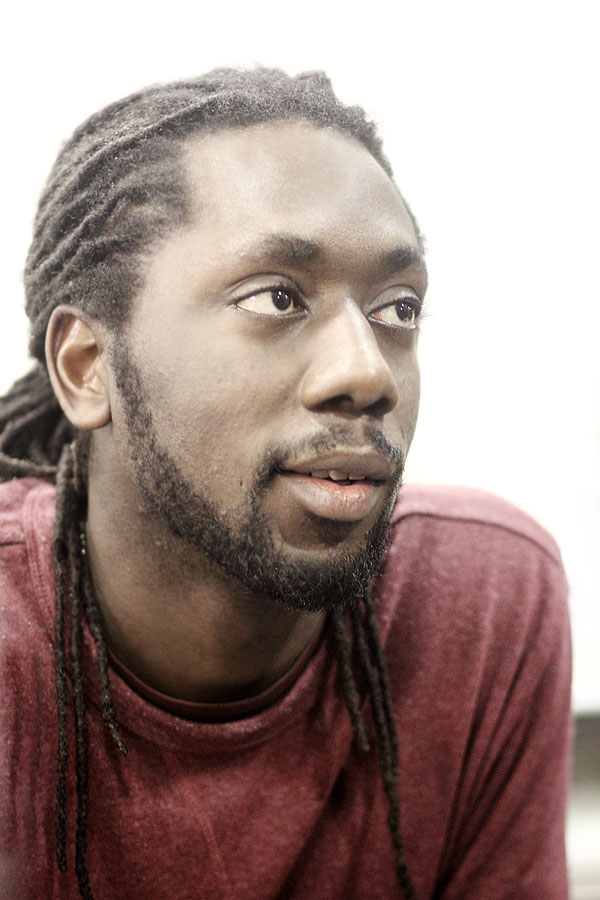
- Born: Cotonou, Benin
- Occupations: Novelist, short story writer
- Writing career
- Period: 2010s–present

Ryad Assani-Razaki (born November 4, 1981) is a Beninese-Canadian writer. His debut short story collection Deux cercles won the Trillium Book Award for French-language fiction in 2010, and his novel La main d'Iman won the Prix Robert-Cliche in 2011 and was shortlisted for the Governor General's Award for French-language fiction in 2012.

Born in Cotonou, Benin, Assani-Razaki first moved to North America in 1999, to study computer science at the University of North Carolina. After graduating in 2002, he struggled to find a job until registering for a master's in computer science at the Université de Montréal in 2004. He wrote his first short story in 2006, after witnessing an Asian man struggle to order food in a fast food restaurant because of his difficulties with the language. Deux cercles was published in 2009.

The Hand of Iman, an English translation of La main d'Iman, was published in 2025.

== Awards ==
- 2010 - Trillium Poetry Prize
- 2011 - Prix Robert-Cliche
- 2012 - nominated for the Governor General's Award for French-language fiction

== Gallery ==
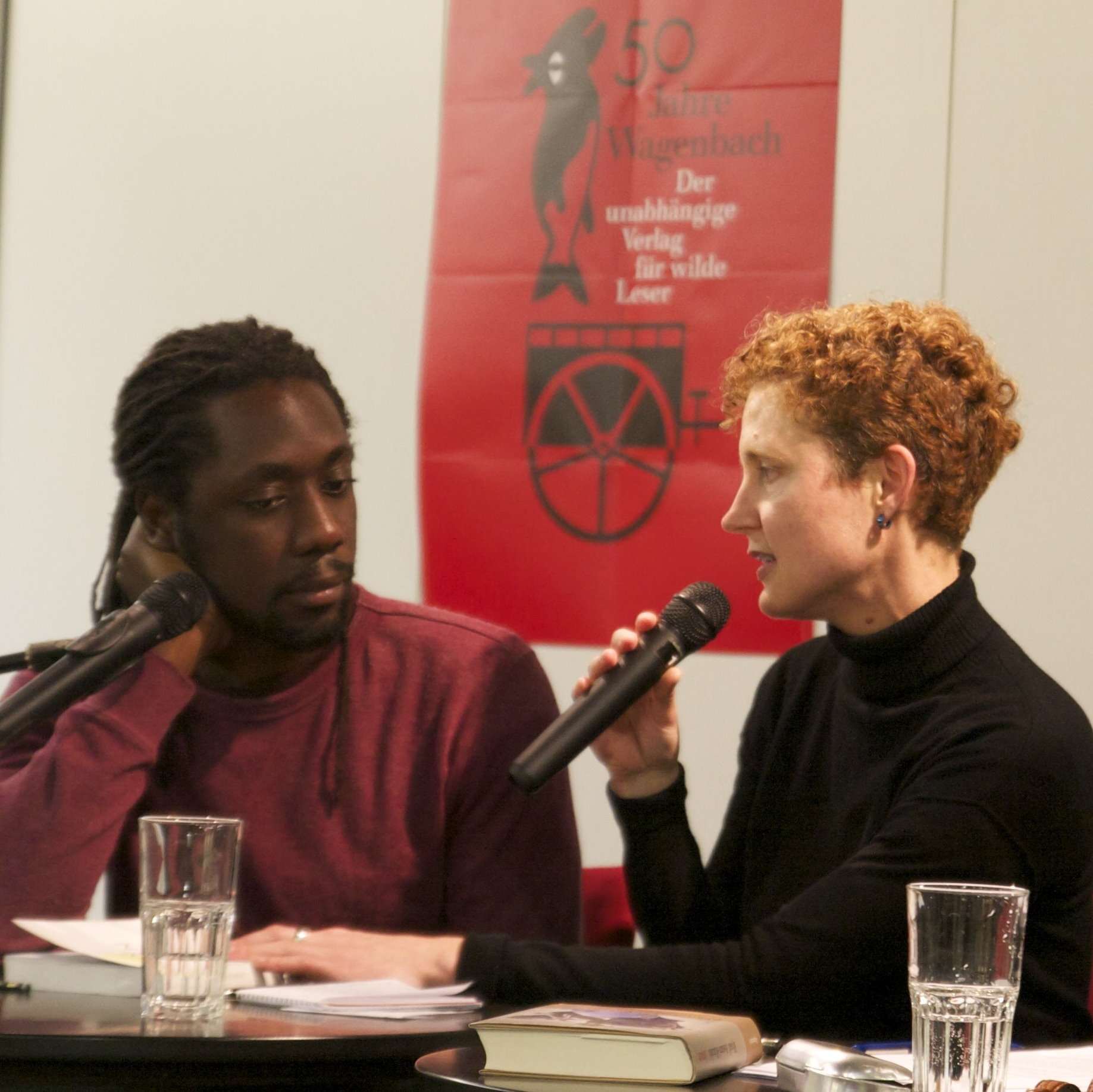
Ryad Assani-Razaki, Sonja Finck, Heine Haus Literaturhaus Düsseldorf

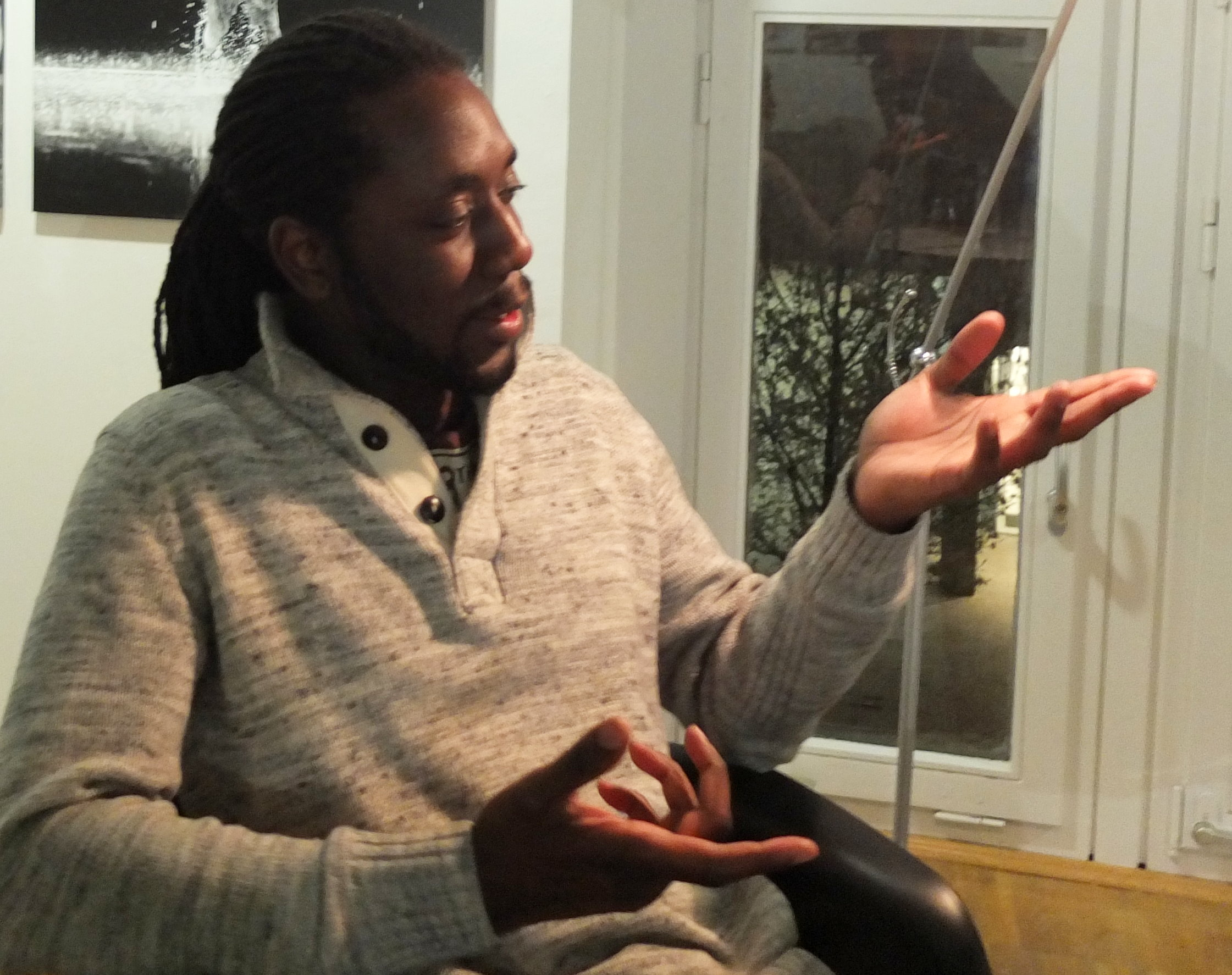
Ryad Assani-Razaki

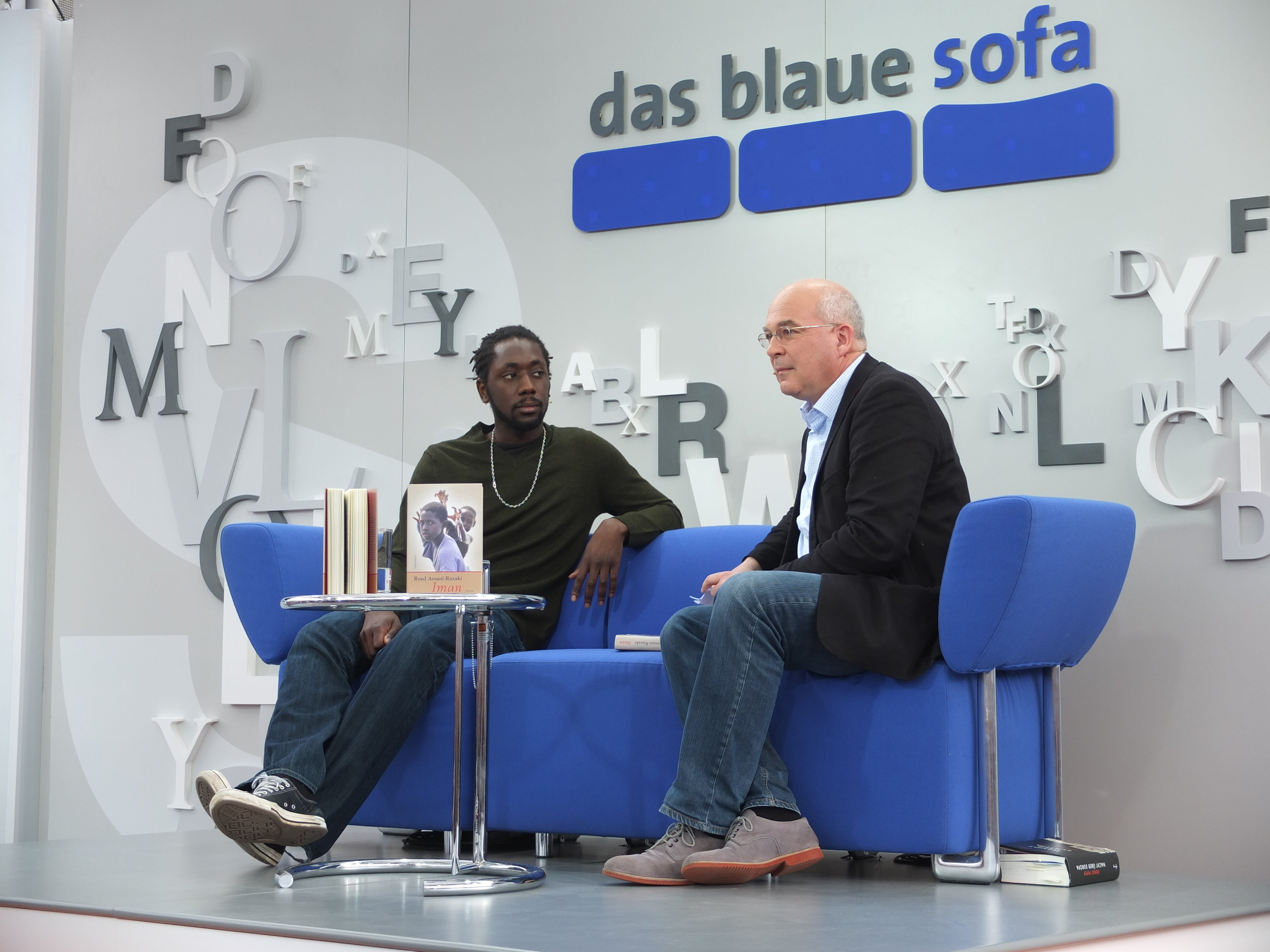
Christhard Läpple, Ryad Assani-Razak at the Leipzig Book Fair 2014
