= Christoph M. Kimmich =

German-American historian (born 1939)

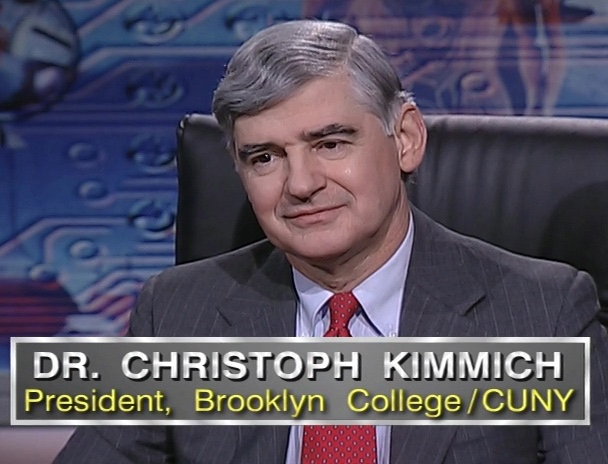
- Kimmich on CUNY TV's Education Forum, 2001

8th President of Brooklyn College
- In office February 2000 – August 2009
- Preceded by: Vernon Lattin
- Succeeded by: Karen L. Gould

Personal details
- Born: January 16, 1939 (age 87) Dresden, Germany
- Education: Haverford College (BA); Oxford University (PhD)

Christoph M. Kimmich (born January 16, 1939) is a German-American historian. He was the eighth President of Brooklyn College from 2000 to 2009. He was educated at Haverford College (BA 1961) and Oxford University (PhD. 1964) and elected to Phi Beta Kappa. He was trained as a historian of modern Europe.

== Career ==
Kimmich was born in Dresden, Germany. He immigrated to the United States and became a U.S. citizen in 1957.

In 1973 he came to Brooklyn College after eight years of teaching at Columbia University. He is a member of the faculty of the Department of History as well as the CUNY Graduate Center. From 1980 to 1984, he served as Chairman of the Department of History, before being appointed Associate Provost. He became Acting Provost in 1988 and Provost the following year. Kimmich served as Interim Chancellor of the City University of New York from November 1997 to September 1999.

In February 2000, he was appointed President of Brooklyn College. Kimmich served as president for nine years before retiring in August 2009.

Kimmich has written several books on German foreign policy in the period between World War I and World War II, as well as articles on this subject and on other subjects in German history. He has lectured in the United States and other countries.

Kimmich has been awarded a Fulbright Scholarship, an International Affairs Fellowship, and a Guggenheim Fellowship. He spent the academic year 1974-75 at the Council on Foreign Relations in New York City, and the academic year 1983-84 as a Visitor at the Institute for Advanced Study in Princeton.
