= Mylène Gilbert-Dumas =

Canadian writer

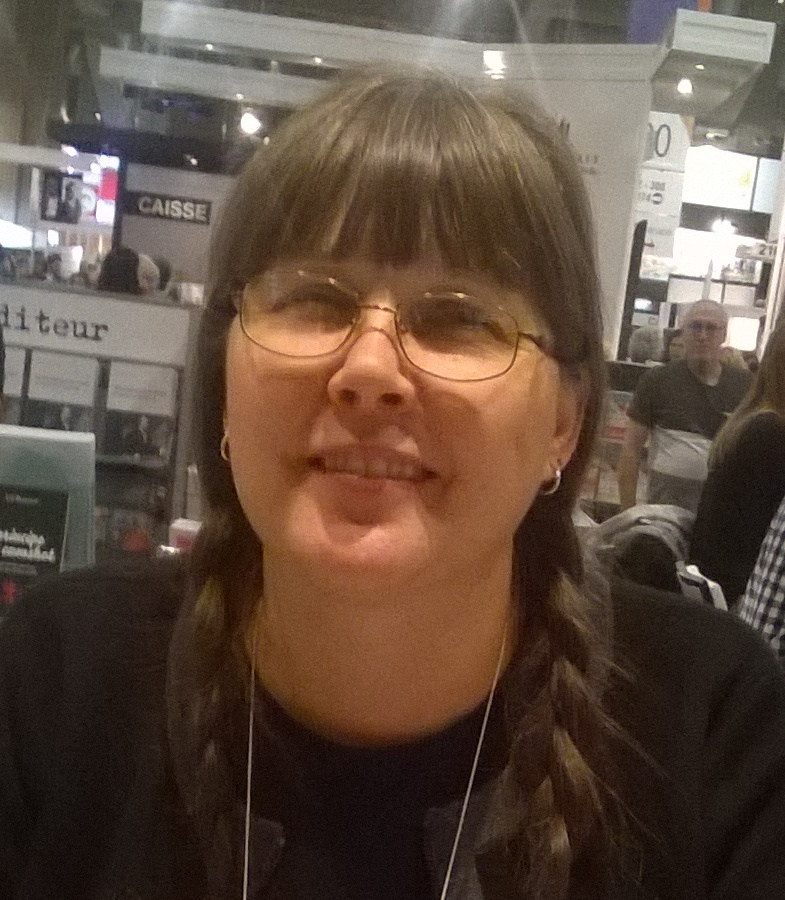
Mylène Gilbert-Dumas

Mylène Gilbert-Dumas (born October 20, 1967) is a Canadian writer living in the Estrie region of Quebec.

She was born in Sherbrooke, Quebec and received a bachelor's degree in French language instruction (secondary school) from Laval University. She taught French in an English school in Quebec for 12 years before returning to Sherbrooke in 2005.

Her first book Les dames de Beauchêne received the Prix Robert-Cliche in 2002 and was a finalist for the Grand prix littéraire Archambault in 2003. In 2009, she was writer-in-residence at Berton House Writer's Retreat in Dawson City. Gilbert-Dumas was also a finalist for a Mr. Christie's Book Award in 2004 for her book for young adults Mystique.

== Selected works ==
- Les dames de Beauchêne, historical fiction - three volumes (2002–2005)
- Lili Klondike, historical fiction - three volumes (2008–2009)
- Détours sur la route de Compostelle, novel (2014)
