= Prix Robert-Cliche =

Literary prize in Canada

The Prix Robert-Cliche is a literary prize created in 1979 to honour Robert Cliche, a Quebec lawyer, judge and politician. The prize is awarded annually for an original French language work by a Canadian author who has not previously published a novel. The manuscript must contain at least 30,000 words.

== Winners ==
- 1979 - Gaëtan Brulotte, L’emprise
- 1980 - Madeleine Monette, Le Double suspect
- 1981 - Robert Lalonde, La belle épouvante
- 1982 - Chrystine Brouillet, Chère voisine
- 1983 - Louise Leblanc, 37 1/2 AA
- 1984 - Danielle Dubé, Les olives noires
- 1985 - Rachel Fontaine, Black magic
- 1986 - Jean-Robert Sansfaçon, Loft story
- 1987 - Louise Doyon, Les héritiers
- 1988 - Raymond Beaudet, Passeport pour la liberté
- 1989 - Jean-Alain Tremblay, La nuit des Perséides
- 1990 - Jean Fontaine, Les lièvres de Saint-Giron
- 1991 - André Girard, Deux semaines en septembre
- 1992 - Gabrielle Gourdeau, Maria Chapdelaine ou le paradis retrouvé
- 1993 - Jacques Desautels, Le quatrième Roi mage
- 1994 - Robert Gagnon, La thèse
- 1995 - not awarded
- 1996 - Danielle Roy, Un cœur farouche
- 1997 - Raymonde Lamothe, L’ange tatoué
- 1998 - Michel Désautels, Smiley
- 1999 - Guy Moreau, L’amour Mallarmé
- 2000 - Chantal Gevrey, Immobile au centre de la danse
- 2001 - Arlette Fortin, C’est la faute au bonheur
- 2002 - Mylène Gilbert-Dumas, Les dames de Beauchêne
- 2003 - Gilles Jobidon, La route des petits matins
- 2004 - Reine-Aimée Côté, Les bruits
- 2005 - Roxanne Bouchard, Whisky et paraboles
- 2006 - François X Côté, Slash
- 2007 - Stéphane Achille, Balade en train assis sur les genoux du dictateur
- 2008 - Danielle Trussart, Le train pour Samarcande
- 2009 - Olivia Tapiero, Les murs
- 2010 - Simon Lambert, La chambre
- 2011 - Ryad Assani-Razaki, La main d'Iman
- 2012 - Judy Quinn, Hunter s'est laissé couler
- 2013 - Philippe Arseneault, Zora. Un conte cruel
- 2014 - Martin Clavet, Ma belle blessure
- 2015 - not awarded
- 2016 - Antoine Charbonneau-Demers, Coco
- 2017 - Philippe Meilleur, Maître Glockenspiel
- 2018 - Alice Guéricolas-Gagné, Saint-Jambe
- 2019 - Alexandre Michaud, Francis
- 2020 - not awarded
- 2021 - Paul Serge Forest, Tout est ori
- 2022 - Joël Bégin, Plessis
- 2023 - Line Richard, La rumeur du ressac
- 2024 - Laura Nicolae, Rue Escalei
