= Vernon Lattin =

American college president (b. 1938)

7th President of Brooklyn College
- In office 1992–2000
- Preceded by: Robert Hess
- Succeeded by: Christoph M. Kimmich

Personal details
- Born: Vernon Eugene Lattin; November 7, 1938 (age 86); Winslow, Arizona, U.S.
- Education: University of New Mexico (BBA, MA); University of Colorado (PhD)

Vernon Eugene Lattin (born November 7, 1938), an American of Mexican-American heritage, was the seventh president of Brooklyn College, from 1992 to 2000.

== Biography ==
Lattin was born in Winslow, Arizona, to Eli Voil Lattin and Betty (Rubi) Lattin. In 1720, his ancestors had moved from Spain to a farming village in what was then called New Spain, and is now New Mexico, which in 1821 became part of Mexico, and then in 1846 became part of the US. He and his family moved to New Mexico when he was eight years old. His single mother raised him and his two brothers.

He attended the University of New Mexico (Bachelor of Business Administration, 1960; Master of Arts in English, 1965) and University of Colorado (Doctor of Philosophy in English, 1970).

From 1965–1967 Lattin was an instructor in English at Wright State University, and from 1970–1974 he was Assistant Professor of English at the University of Tennessee. He was next at Northern Illinois University, where from 1974–1977 he was coordinator of communication skills and English, from 1974–1981 he was Associate Professor of English, and from 1978–1981 he was director of the Center Latino and Latin American Studies. From 1982–1988 he was associate vice president of academic affairs at the University of Wisconsin, and from 1989–1992 he was Provost and Professor of English at Arizona State University.

He was president of Brooklyn College from 1992 to 2000.

Lattin is the co-author of Tomas Rivera, 1935–1984: The Man and His Work, Bilingual Review/Press (1988). He also authored Contemporary Chicano fiction: a critical survey; Studies in the language and literature of United States Hispanos, Bilingual Press/Editorial Bilingüe (1986).

| Preceded by Robert Hess | President of Brooklyn College; 1992–2000 | Succeeded by Christoph M. Kimmich |
