= Prix Anne-Hébert =

Canadian literary award

The Prix Anne-Hébert is a Canadian literary award, presented annually to the best first work of fiction in French by a writer from Quebec. The award was created by Robert Desbiens in 2000 to honour writer Anne Hébert following her death.

The award has a monetary value of $7,500. It is sponsored by the Centre culturel canadien à Paris and Société Radio-Canada.

== Winners ==
- 2001 - Maryse Barbance, Toxiques
- 2002 - Denis Thériault, L'Iguane
- 2003 - Marie-Hélène Poitras, Soudain le Minotaure
- 2004 - Hélène Dorion, Jours de sable
- 2005 - Gilles Jobidon, La Route des petits matins
- 2006 - Nicolas Dickner, Nikolski
- 2007 - Mélanie Vincelette, Crimes horticoles
- 2008 - Anne Rose Gorroz L'homme Ligote; Michèle Plomer, Jardin sablier (jury special mention)
