= Guthrie Cortland Medical Center =

- Guthrie

Geography
- Location: 134 Homer Avenue, Cortland, New York, United States
- Coordinates: 42°36′31.7″N 76°11′15.0″W

Organization
- Care system: Private
- Type: Community

Services
- Beds: 144

History
- Founded: 1891

Links
- Website: www.guthrie.org/location/guthrie-cortland-medical-center
- Lists: Hospitals in New York State

The Guthrie Cortland Medical Center, formerly known as Cortland Regional Medical Center, is a large rural hospital in Cortland, New York founded in 1891. Cortland Regional Medical Center was ranked the top hospital in New York State by Centers for Medicare and Medicaid in 2015 and 2017. In 2016, it was received the Blue Distinction Center+ for Maternity Care award.

== History ==
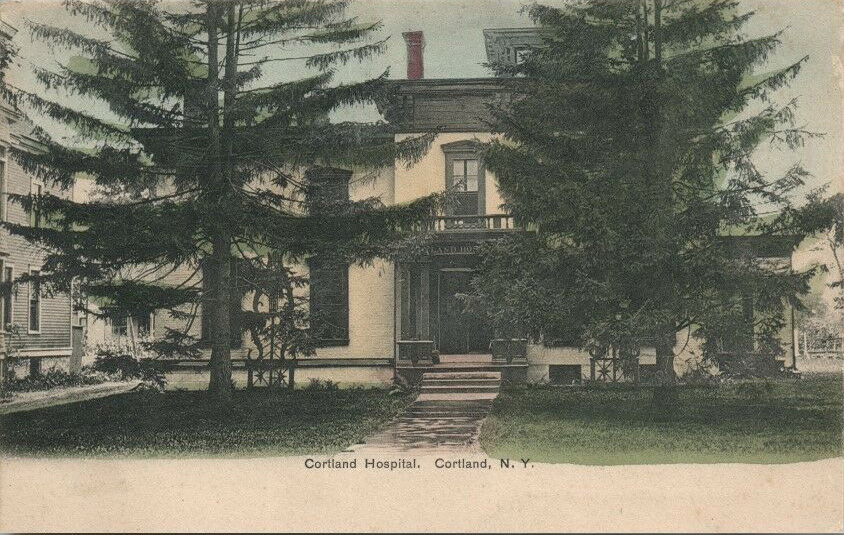
Cortland Hospital circa 1906

October 22, 1888 saw the formation of Cortland's Loyal Circle of King's Daughters. Rev. J. A. Robinson, of Grace Church, had been recommending the formation of a hospital for the region, and the King's Daughters decided to make this the first major order of business. By April of the next year, $25 was set aside. In February, 1891, a public meeting was held to discuss the organization of a hospital and ten days later, on February 23, 1891, the Cortland Hospital Association was formed. The King's Daughters transferred $1300 to the new organization's treasury.

Cortland Hospital, with space for six patients, opened on April 1, 1891, in a rented cottage on Clayton Avenue. Within just a few short years, the number of patients outgrew this hospital and an 1834 home at 84 North Main Street was bought for $6000 and dedicated on March 27, 1895. It had five private patient rooms, two wards with seven beds each, and a classroom for nurse training, with room to expand to 25 beds if needed. The previous year, in 1894, a training program for nurses was started.

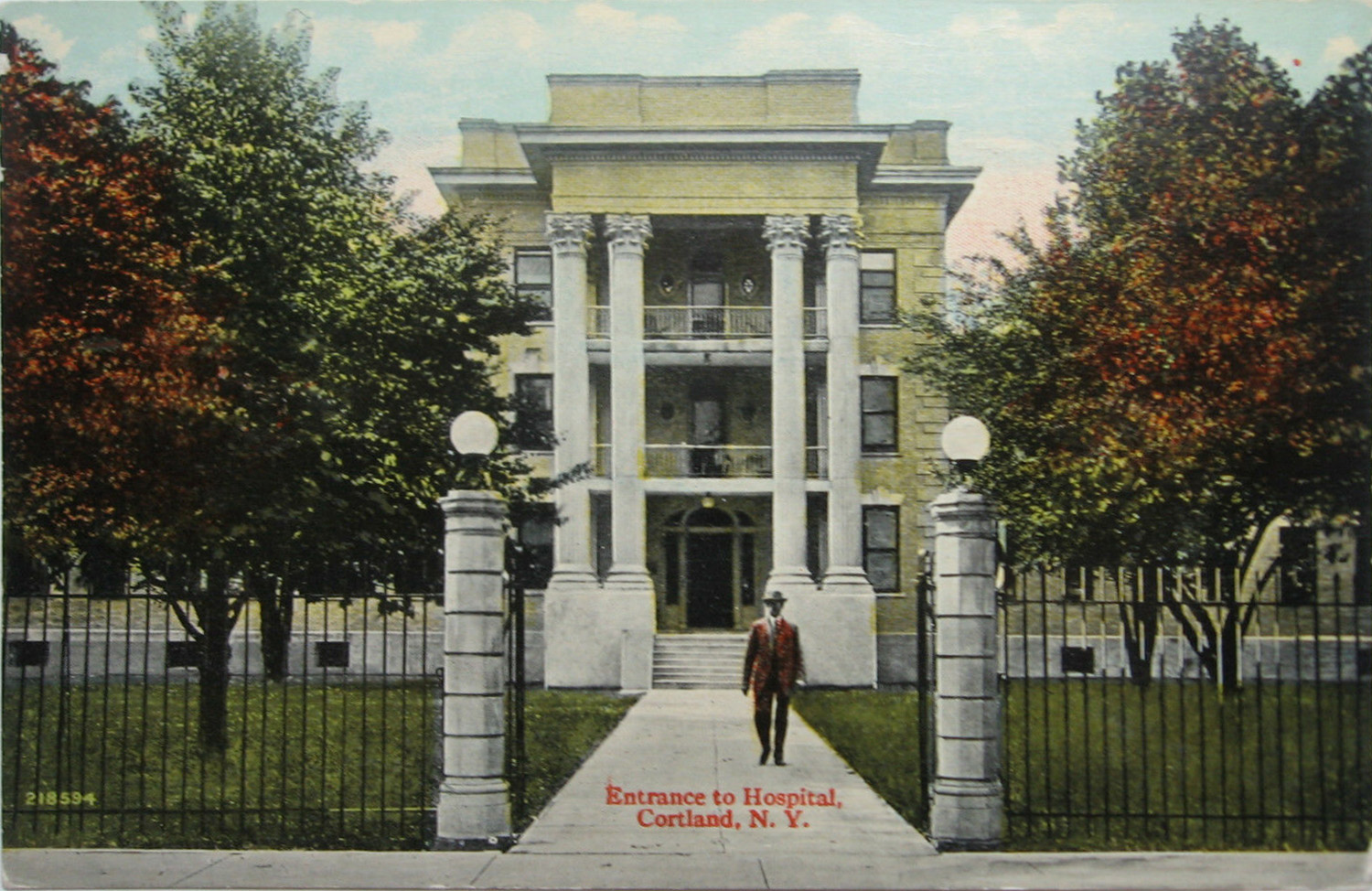
Cortland Hospital circa 1911

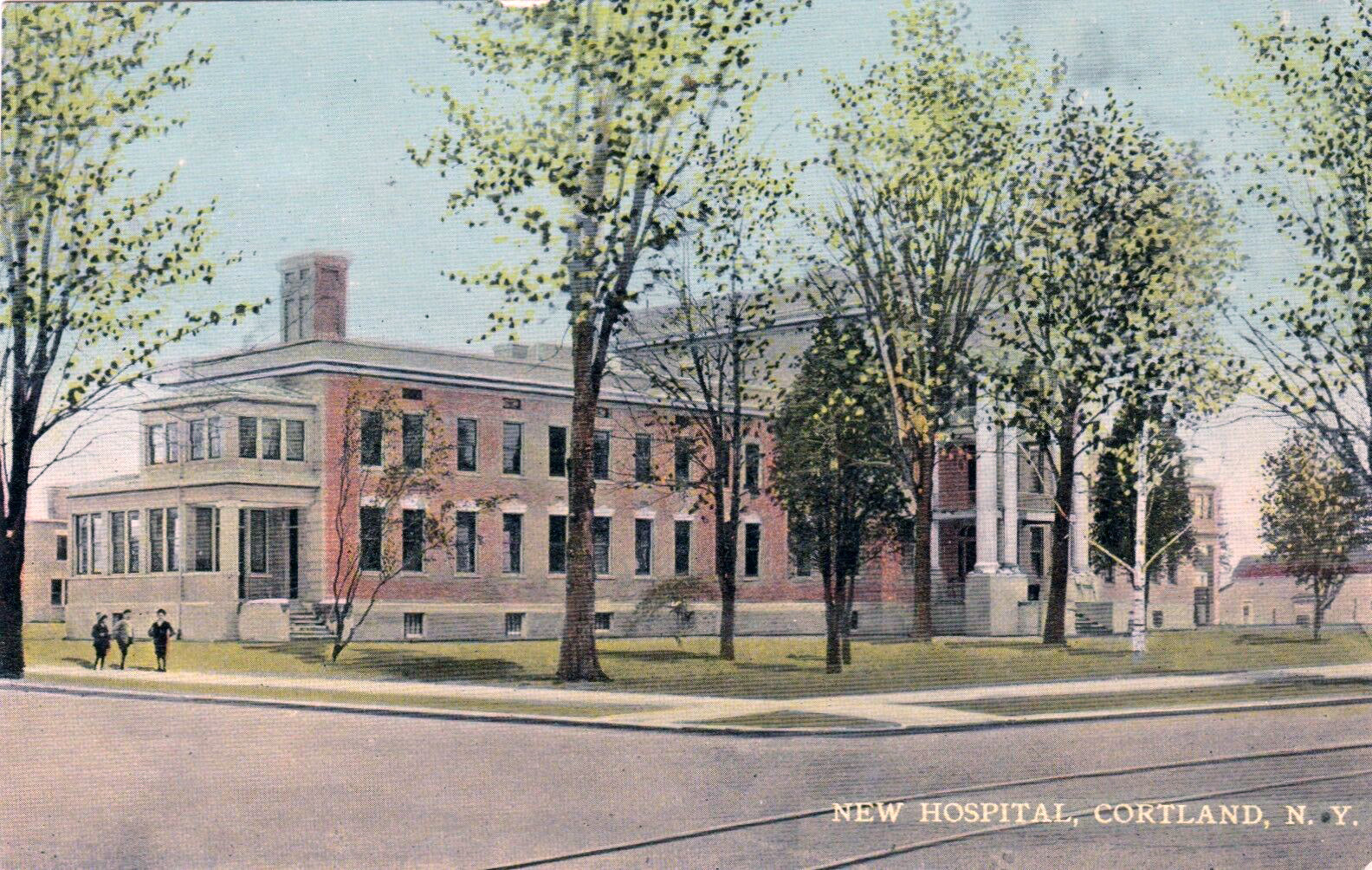
Cortland Hospital circa 1913

Around 1909, George H. Wiltsie sold his five-acre property at 134 Homer Avenue to the hospital association for $18,000 and Chester F. Wickwire initially donated $70,000 to construct a "first-rate" facility. The property housed the Copeland-Fitz Boynton residence which was attached to the rear of the new building. This Cortland Hospital opened in 1911 with an entrance modeled on that of the White House. By 1911, Wickwire had donated a total of $95,000. The new hospital had 52 beds total with separate wards for men and women, 22 private rooms, a children's ward, and two operating rooms.

Cortland Hospital opened a new 21-bed maternity wing in February 1922, delivering 135 babies by the end of the year. Six years later, the hospital expands again, adding a west pavilion that brought the hospital's total beds to 115.

In 1946, the University of the State of New York opened a nursing school in Morrisville, New York and Cortland County Hospital became a clinical training site. This partnership existed until 1980.

Cortland expanded again in 1962, opening a central pavilion that expanded the hospital to 170 beds. All open wards were closed by 1966, with patients in private and semi-private rooms. In 1978, a new south wing was completed with two new 33-bed medical-surgical units, a new intensive care unit and pediatrics units, a new emergency department, laboratory, and radiology department.

In 1993, the hospital opened a new 80 bed nursing home. Ten years later, a new emergency department and urgent care were opened.

Over the years and multiple changes, the name has changed from Cortland Hospital, to Cortland County Hospital (1917), Cortland Memorial Hospital (1955), to Cortland Regional Medical Center (2006), and most recently, Guthrie Cortland Medical Center when it became an entity of the Guthrie Clinic January 1, 2019. Guthrie is now its parent organization after Cortland had mounting financial losses and patient number decline.

== Controversies ==
In 2015, the Leapfrog Group rated Cortland Regional Medical Center "F" for patient safety, one of only two hospitals in New York to receive this grade. By spring 2019, the hospital has consistently raised its grade to "C." The New York State Department of Health rated the hospital with all average and above average ratings in the same categories for 2018.
