= Dave Sear =

Folk musician

- Born: New York City
- Genres: Folk music
- Instrument: Banjo
- Formerly of: American Folk Trio

Dave Sear is an American folk singer and banjo player. He performed and recorded with musicians that included Mary Travers, Jean Ritchie, and Oscar Brand. He was also part of the American Folk Trio with Sonja Savig and Lee Kahn. Sear also had a career as a radio host and producer for the national syndicated radio program Folk Music Almanac which aired on WNYC in New York City for over 40 years from 1959 to 1996.

== Early life and education ==
Sear learned to play banjo when he was eight years old. He attended high school in New York City where he emphasized playing folk music. He attended Black Mountain College where he studied music with composer Lou Harrison. He went on to attend Manhattan School of Music and had formal music training at the Music Work Shop in New York. Sear was inspired by social activist and banjo player Pete Seeger, who performed at his school when he was younger. He was also influenced by the Almanac Singers, Golden Gate Singers, and Lead Belly.

== Career ==
He performed on the Folksong Festival radio show and later played banjo and sang on the 1948 Oscar Brand album Absolute Nonsense, and on the Oscar Brand Bawdy Songs and Backroom Ballads series, including Bawdy Sea Shanties and Bawdy Songs Go to College. He also recorded the 1959 live album A Folk Concert in Town Hall, New York along with Jean Ritchie and Oscar Brand. In the 1950s, Sear began hosting and producing the WNYC-FM show Folk Music Almanac, a nationally syndicated radio program which he ran for more than 35 years. He also hosted the shows Adventures in Folk Music and Folk and Baroque.

In the early 1960s, Sear formed his own group, the American Folk Trio, along with Sonja Savig and Lee Kahn. The three met at the Yale Folk Festival as solo artists and played as a group on television as well as toured throughout the United States. Sear went solo again beginning in 1965.

Sear is credited with teaching Paul Newman how to play banjo for the 1967 film Cool Hand Luke. He also performed with Mary Travers prior to her joining Peter, Paul and Mary. Sear was also a faculty member of Hofstra University where he taught courses on American folk music. Audio recordings of Sear from his radio shows from 1959 to 1996 are part of the Dave Sear Collection at the University of North Carolina at Chapel Hill.
