= Suzanne Lamy =

- Born: September 30, 1929; Lombez, France
- Died: February 25, 1987 (aged 57); Montreal, Quebec, Canada
- Education: Université de Montréal
- Occupations: Taught French and Quebec literature at the Cégep du Vieux-Montréal
- Known for: The essays: D'elles (1979) and Quand je lis je m'invente (1984)

Suzanne Lamy (September 30, 1929 – February 25, 1987) was a French-born educator, essayist and critic in Quebec.

She was born in Lombez and came to Quebec in 1954. She studied at the Université de Montréal and taught French and Quebec literature at the Cégep du Vieux-Montréal from 1968 to 1986. Lamy also lectured at the Université de Montréal and the Université de Sherbrooke.

She is best known for her two essays: D'elles (1979) and Quand je lis je m'invente (1984), which contributed to the development of feminist criticism in Quebec. Her writing appeared in various magazines such as Châtelaine, Forces, Cahiers du centre de recherche sur le surréalisme and Actuellement. She was manager for the cultural magazine Spirale from 1984 to 1986.

She died in Montreal at the age of 57.

== Selected works ==
- Lamy, Suzanne; Lamy, Laurent (1967). La renaissance des métiers d'art au Canada français. Québec: Ministère des affaires culturelles. OCLC 9792737.
- Lamy, Suzanne (1977). André Breton: hermétisme et poésie dans Arcane 17. Montréal: Presses de l'Université de Montréal. ISBN 9780840503626.
- Lamy, Suzanne (1979). D'elles. Montréal: L'Hexagone. ISBN 9782890061644.
- Lamy, Suzanne (1981). Marguerite Duras à Montréal. Montréal, Québec: Éditions Spirale. ISBN 9782980010101.
- Lamy, Suzanne (1983). Féminité, subversion, écriture. Montréal Ville Saint-Laurent: Editions du Remue-ménage Distribution, Prologue. ISBN 9782890910454.
- Lamy, Suzanne (1984). Quand je lis, je m'invente: essai. Montréal: Hexagone. ISBN 9782890062092.
- Lamy, Suzanne (1997). La convention: récit. Outremont, Québec: Lanctôt. ISBN 9782894850282.
- Lamy, Suzanne; Yanacopoulo, Andrée; Bigras, Julien (1990). Textes: une éthique à redécouvrir. Montréal: L'Hexagone. ISBN 9782890063815.
