= Jean-Alain Tremblay =

Jean-Alain Tremblay (March 18, 1952 – June 9, 2005) was a writer who lived in the Saguenay–Lac-Saint-Jean region of Quebec, Canada.

The son of Gérard Tremblay and Rita Dufour, he was born Jeannot Tremblay in Alma, Quebec. Tremblay received a bachelor's degree in administration from Laval University. He worked as director of employment development at Chicoutimi for Employment and Immigration Canada and later as director of regional operations for Réseau Emploi-Québec du Saguenay/Lac St-Jean.

His first novel La nuit des Perséides, published in 1989, received the Prix Robert-Cliche, the Prix Jean-Hamelin and the Prix de la bibliothèque centrale de prêt du Saguenay-Lac-Saint-Jean. This was followed by La grande chamaille, published in 1993. Tremblay also wrote a radio drama Par la bande, broadcast on Radio-Canada in 2001. He published a nine volume collection of short stories based in the Saguenay–Lac-Saint-Jean region: Un lac, un fjord, un fleuve.

Tremblay was president of the Musée Louis-Hémon de Péribonka from 1992 to 1995 and was a founding member of the Association professionnelle des écrivains de la Sagamie Côte-Nord, also serving as its president.

He was married to Manon Brault; the couple had four children.

Tremblay died in Chicoutimi at the age of 53.
