= Alain Guillerm =

French historian

Alain Jean Andre Guillerm (9 April 1944 – 25 June 2005) was a French historian.
