= Alain Nonat =

Alain Jean Marie Nonat (June 18, 1942 – December 31, 2024) was a French-born Canadian tenor and educator who is the founder of Montréal's Théâtre Lyrichorégra 20.

== Early life and education ==
Born in Melun, France, Nonat studied voice in Paris before immigrating to Canada in 1966. In Montréal, he performed with Opera McGill and the Montreal Symphony Orchestra's chorus. He completed further studies at the Conservatoire National Supérieur de Musique et de Danse de Paris and returned permanently to Montréal in 1975.

== Career ==
In 1976, Nonat founded Théâtre Lyrichorégra 20, serving as volunteer director. The organization promoted opera and ran the Jeunes Ambassadeurs Lyriques program which provided auditions, scholarships, and performance opportunities in Europe and Asia, supporting artists such as Karoline Podolak, Jessica Muirhead, Michèle Losier, Julie Boulianne, and Étienne Dupuis.

Nonat also taught music full-time at elementary schools in Laval, Quebec, until his retirement in 2004. He also created programs to introduce opera to schoolchildren and organized cultural exchanges, notably with the Czech Republic and Slovakia, stemming from his admiration for composers such as Leoš Janáček and Antonín Dvořák.

== Recognition ==
- Chevalier de l'Ordre des Arts et des Lettres de la République française
- Queen Elizabeth II's Diamond Jubilee Medal
- Order of the President of the Slovak Republic
- Gold Medal of the Lieutenant-General of Quebec
