= Cincinnati Romance Review =

Academic journal founded in 1981

- Discipline: Romance-language literature
- Language: English
- Edited by: María Paz Moreno

Publication details
- History: 1981–present
- Publisher: University of Cincinnati (United States)

Standard abbreviations
- ISO 4: Cincinnati Roman. Rev.

Indexing
- ISSN: 2155-8817
- OCLC no.: 609592682

Links
- Journal homepage

The Cincinnati Romance Review is a peer-reviewed academic journal covering research and reviews subjects related to romance languages, literatures, and cultures. It was established in 1981 and is published by the Department of Romance and Arabic Languages and Literatures of the University of Cincinnati. It has been published electronically since 2008. Articles may be written in English, French, Spanish, Portuguese, or Italian. The editor-in-chief is María Paz Moreno.

== Abstracting and indexing ==
The journal is abstracted and indexed in the Modern Language Association Database and in Scopus from 2012 to 2019, and again in 2022, after which coverage was discontinued.
