= Boston Book Festival =

Nonprofit group based in Cambridge, Massachusetts

- Industry: Literature and Publishing
- Founded: 2009
- Founder: Deborah Z Porter
- Headquarters: Cambridge, Massachusetts, United States
- Area served: Greater Boston area
- Revenue: 361,480 United States dollar (2022)
- Total assets: 447,346 United States dollar (2022)
- Website: bostonbookfest.org

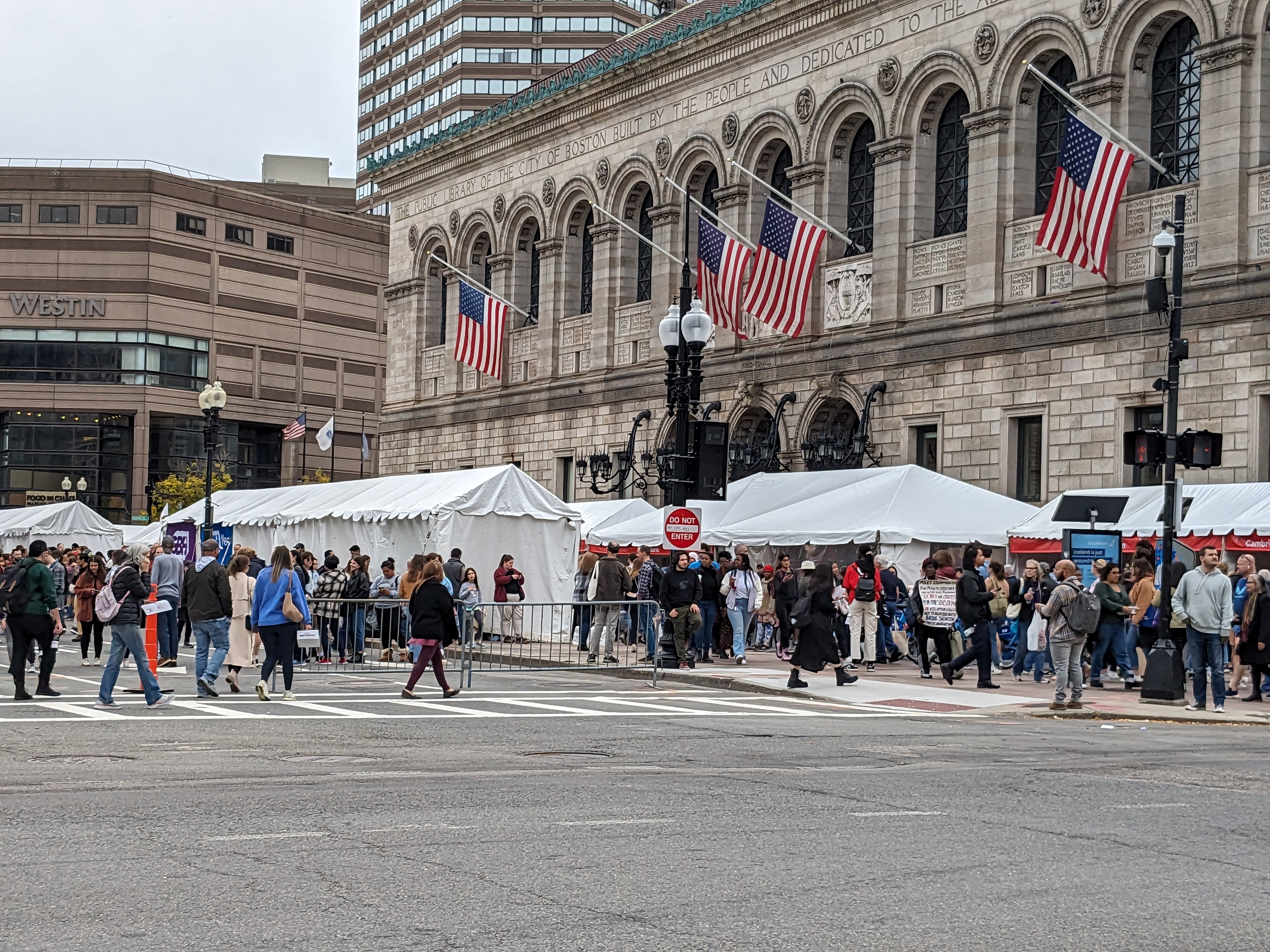
The 2023 Boston Book Festival street festival in Copley Square

The Boston Book Festival (BBF) is an independent nonprofit group based in Cambridge, Massachusetts, and also the name of its main event. The nonprofit was founded in 2009 by Deborah Z Porter, and aims to "celebrate the power of words to stimulate, agitate, unite, delight, and inspire by holding year-round events culminating in an annual, free Festival that promotes a culture of reading and ideas and enhances the vibrancy of our city".

The annual book festival combines a street festival with an array of authors and other literary presenters from around the world. Daytime events at the BBF are free. In 2014, 32,000 people attended.

Throughout the year, BBF hosts several literary events, several of which fall under their annual "Lounge Lit" series of literary outings, such as readings, cookbook author demos, and an annual literary pub trivia night. Since 2011, BBF has also hosted evening “kick-off” activities leading up to the Saturday festival.

== Annual festival ==
The Festival is held each October in Boston's Back Bay. Speaker presentations have taken place in the Boston Public Library, Church of the Covenant, Old South Church, Trinity Church, and Back Bay Events Center, among other locations in and around Copley Square.

The street festival is hosted on Copley Square, and usually includes a live music stage, dozens of exhibitors and vendors, and many free participatory activities for attendees and their families. This includes programming and activities for children, writing workshops and contests, and open mic opportunities.

=== 2009 ===
The inaugural festival on October 24, 2009, included more than seventy-five authors, including Ken Burns, Anita Diamant, Andre Dubus III, Tom Perrotta, Alicia Silverstone, and John Hodgman. Nobel laureate Orhan Pamuk delivered the keynote address in the sanctuary of Old South Church to over 1000 festival-goers. Popular sessions were “Ties That Bind” (featuring Elinor Lipman, Richard Russo, and Michael Thomas), “Power of Place” (featuring Anita Diamant, Elizabeth Nunez, Carolina De Robertis, and Anita Shreve), and "The Obama Year", featuring Jack Beatty, David Gergan, Lani Guinier, and Michael E. Porter.

=== 2010 ===
In 2010, the festival, held on October 16, included 130 authors and over forty sessions, with presenters including Bill Bryson, Food Network star Tyler Florence, Boston novelist Dennis Lehane, Nobel Prize winners Joseph Stiglitz and Amartya Sen, and surgeon and journalist Atul Gawande. Featured sessions included: “Bugs in the System” (featuring Dan Ariely and Mark Moffett), “Pop Culture” (featuring Lisa Birnbach, Chip Kidd, and David Rakoff), “Talking About Justice” (featuring Dambisa Moyo, Michael Sandel, and Amartya Sen), and “From Page to Screen” featuring A. M. Homes, Dennis Lehane, and Tom Perrotta. The kids' keynote speaker was Diary of a Wimpy Kid creator Jeff Kinney. Joyce Carol Oates closed the festival with a standing-room-only keynote address in the Trinity Church sanctuary. Attendance at BBF 2010 was 24,000, doubling the size of the crowd from the first year.

This year's festival also celebrated the start of a new literary outreach program: One City One Story. This initiative encouraged the greater Boston community to read and discuss a piece of literary fiction by making it readily available.

=== 2011 ===
The 2011 festival took place on October 15 and was similar in size to the 2010 festival. Large crowds filed in to hear talks such as: "Far Out Fiction" (featuring Gregory Maguire, Karen Russell, Chuck Klosterman, and Kate Beaton), “A Reason to Lead” (featuring Governor Deval Patrick), “Graphic Novels” (featuring Daniel Clowes, Seth, and Alison Bechdel), and “Frontiers of Science” featuring Stephen Greenblatt, Lisa Randall, Siddhartha Mukherjee. Mo Willems was the kids' keynote speaker, and Michael Ondaatje delivered the festival-closing keynote, both presenting to several hundred attendees at the Back Bay Events Center's John Hancock Hall. The festival kicked off on Friday, October 14, with a special session called "The Art of The Wire", featuring a discussion with actors and writers of the acclaimed HBO television series.

=== 2012 ===
In 2012, the festival was on October 27, and it boasted an array of speakers, including Junot Díaz, Chip Kidd, and Hanna Rosin. Lemony Snicket was the kids' keynote speaker, and the ticketed evening keynote featured Richard Ford, interviewed by Claire Messud. Popular sessions were "The Brain: Thinking About Thinking" (featuring Eric Kandel and Ray Kurzweil), “Serious Satire” (featuring Lizz Winstead, Kevin Bleyer, and Baratunde Thurston), "Fiction: Time and Place" (featuring Dennis Lehane, Tayari Jones, and Alex Gilvarry), and “YA: The Future Is Now" featuring M. T. Anderson, Rachel Cohn, Cory Doctorow, and Gabrielle Zevin. The 2012 kickoff event was called "Page to Screen", which featured authors whose works had been adapted for film and television, including Buzz Bissinger, Rachel Cohn, Andre Dubus III, Nick Flynn, and Daniel Handler.

In 2012 the festival launched a new program called BBF Unbound, in which community members were invited to submit proposals for sessions. In 2012, two proposals were accepted and subsequently developed and presented at the BBF: "Writing the War" and "Books Behind Bars".

=== 2013 ===
The fifth annual festival was held October 17–19. The festival kicked off on October 17 with an evening session entitled “Writing Terror: An Exploration of Fear”, which featured Wes Craven, Mary Louise Kelly, Jessica Stern, and Valerie Plame Wilson in a discussion moderated by Joe Klein. The first-ever kids' kickoff event, on the afternoon of October 18, featured Newbery Medalists Kate DiCamillo, Jack Gantos, and Rebecca Stead. Keynote speaker Salman Rushdie spoke to a sellout crowd at Old South Church on the evening of October 18. Other notable presenters included Paul Harding, Ty Burr, Chuck Klosterman, Clifford Ross, and kids' keynote speaker Tomie dePaola. “Synthetic Biology: Designing Life” (featuring Emily Anthes, Juan Enriquez, and Craig Venter); “Dirty, Crazy, Endless Love” (featuring Nicholson Baker, Andre Dubus III, and Jamie Quatro); “The Rise and Fall of Nations” (featuring Noah Feldman and James Robinson); and “Our Boston” (featuring Mike Barnicle, Madeleine Blais, Leigh Montville, and Lesley Visser) were some of the largest presentations.

=== 2014 ===
The 2014 festival took place on October 23–25. Herbie Hancock, the memoir keynote speaker, started off the festival Thursday evening as he discussed his life and musical times with Berklee College of Music president Roger Brown. The following night, fiction keynote speaker Susan Minot joined Nigerian-American journalist Dayo Olopade in a conversation about Minot's latest novel Thirty Girls. Saturday's festivities began with kids’ keynote speaker Rick Riordan filling Trinity Church to capacity with fans young and old of his Percy Jackson & the Olympians series. There were over 150 notable presenters at the 2014 festival with panels such as “Technology: Promise and Peril” (featuring Andrew McAfee, David Rose, Nicholas Carr, and moderator Sacha Pfeiffer), “Mayor’s Rule” (featuring Benjamin Barber, Marty Walsh, Mayor Thomas Menino, Mayor Dan Rivera, and Mayor Lisa Wong, with host Bob Oakes), "Fiction: Love and Loss" (featuring Leah Hager Cohen, Celeste Ng, and Jaime Clarke), and “(Post) Modern Love” (featuring Daniel Jones, Margo Howard, Jennifer Finney Boylan, and moderator Meredith Goldstein); all drawing large crowds. The third keynote speaker Doris Kearns Goodwin provided her insights on presidential leadership from Lincoln to Obama in her history keynote, while Norman Foster rounded out the festival with his art, architecture, and design keynote.

=== 2017 ===
The 9th annual event took place October 26–28 in Copley Square with the theme of “Where We Find Ourselves”. Thursday night began the festival with “Lit Crawl Boston”. On Friday, an authors’ variety show, “The Book Revue”, was performed. Sarah Howard Parker, Director of Operations, called it “the most ambitious and complex festival we have had”. The schedule included author signings, music and dance workshops, science experiments, hands-on art explorations, inter-personal games, and writer workshops. Activities for children included appearances by characters Waldo, Nutbrown Hare, Olivia, Maisy, and the duo Elephant and Piggie. Lemony Snicket provided a kids’ keynote featuring the new picture book, “The Bad Mood and the Stick”, Waltham-raised author Joanna Schaffhausen presented her case for crime-solving in the “Gumshoes to Cyber Sleuths” session at the Old South Church. Adam Gopnik, Alan Light, and Rob Sheffield provided a session studying Beatles music and lyrics at the Church of the Covenant. “This is the Place: Women Writing about Home” was held at Trinity Church. Another version of home was discussed in “Voices of America: The Immigrant Experience Through a Writer’s Eyes”, featuring award-winning Grace Talusan. At Emmanuel Church, “Memoir: Strange Journeys”, was moderated by WBUR ARTery reporter Maria Garcia. Virginia Prescott provided the podcast “Welcome to Nightvale". Old South Church was the site for “Natural and Unnatural History: Earthquakes and Woolly Mammoths”. Additionally, Somerville author Daphne Kalotay provided the “One City One Story” feature.

For the first time in its nine-year history, the BBF dedicated a whole venue exclusively to sessions for writers. The Boston Common Hotel and Conference Center was the main site for these sessions. Included was a game of “Literary Never Have I Ever” hosted by Stephanie Gayle. “Reading Like a Writer: Debuts, Perspective, and Setting”, was a trilogy of sessions connecting professionals of the craft. “Reading Like a Writer: Poetry”, featuring Stephanie Burt, Myron Hardy, and Erika L. Sanchez provided attendees with sample exploration. “BBF Unbound: Writing from Privilege”, featured authors Alexandria Marzano-Lesnevich, Shuchi Saraswat, Laura van den Berg, Hasanthika Sirisena, and Kaitlin Solimine. Mass Poetry sponsored “Poems and Pints” at XHALE. Rebecca Morgan Frank, Krysten Hill, and Natalie Shapero were the featured poets.

=== 2018 ===
The 2018 festival was held on October 13. It was the tenth annual event and took place in venues throughout Copley Square, including Emmanuel Church, French Cultural Center, Church of the Covenant, Trinity Church, Old South Church, Boston Public Library, Prudential Center, Boston Architectural College, and Room & Board. For the first time, East Boston and Roxbury were included as satellites. Also for the first time, a "Hide-a-Book" event was held on Tuesday the 9th, during which Boston Book Festival volunteers hid books in and around Boston and tweeted pictures of them for people to find. The "One City One Story" program was suspended due to litigation and claims of plagiarism.

A kickoff keynote was at the Old South Church was by Michael Pollan with Meghna Chakrabarti. The festival drew a record crowd. More than 275 authors were featured, and 30,000 people attended. The overall focus of the event was on societal issues such as environment, gun violence, #MeToo, social media, cultural divides, and diplomacy. Animal activist Sy Montgomery was featured in the "Animal Story" panel. "Twitter Ate My Brain" included Michael Rich, Tree Sreenivasan, and Maryanne Wolf. Multi-cultural authors Sam Graham-Felsen, Yang Huang, Blair Hurley, and Fatima Farheen Mirza shared and discussed their work in "Between Cultures". Graham Allison joined James Sebenius and Wendy Sherman in discussion of "Diplomacy: the Art of the Deal". Sessions specifically for writers were also offered, as were special programs for young adults and children.

=== 2019 ===
The 2019 festival took place on October 18–20 with the theme of "Connections." There were six keynote speakers and more than 350 presenters.

=== 2020 ===
The 2020 festival was held virtually on October 24–25.

=== 2021 ===
The 2021 festival took place October 16-23 in a mostly virtual format.

=== 2022 ===
The 2022 festival was held on October 28 and October 29. Publishers such as University of Massachusetts Press, Stillwater River Publications, and She Writes Press attended.

=== 2023 ===
The 2023 festival was held on October 14. Keynote speakers included Rick Riordan, Heather Cox Richardson, and Chloe Gong. The poetry headliners were Diannely Antigua and Oliver de la Paz.

=== 2024 ===
The 2024 festival was held on October 26 in Copley Square at locations including the Boston Public Library, Old South Church, Church of the Covenant, Trinity Church, the Goethe-Institut Boston, the French Library, and Room & Board.

== One City One Story ==
One City One Story (also known as "1C1S") is Boston's annual citywide reading program started by the Boston Book Festival in 2010. The organization prints and distributes, free of charge, 30,000 copies of a short story. The program is intended to lower barriers around reading literary fiction for enjoyment. It functions as a way for the Greater Boston area to come together around a shared reading experience. The program, which usually kicks off in late summer, also starts to build momentum for the Boston Book Festival itself.

The short story chosen the first year was Tom Perrotta's "The Smile on Happy Chang's Face," first published in Post Road Magazine. In 2011 the story was "The Whore's Child" by Richard Russo. The 2012 1C1S selection was "The Lobster Mafia Story" by Anna Solomon. In 2013, it was "Karma" by Rishi Reddi. The 2014 selection was “Sublimation” by Jennifer Haigh. Each year, multiple translations are made available on the Boston Book Festival website and printed copies (in English and, since 2012, in Spanish) are distributed to Boston's libraries, subway stations, coffeehouses, bookstores, farmers' markets, and elsewhere. The program culminates each year with a session at the October Boston Book Festival, at which the story's author participates in a town hall-style discussion with attendees who have read the work.

One City One Story was suspended in 2018 due to litigation and claims of plagiarism.

== Authors ==
=== 2018 ===
A kickoff keynote was at the Old South Church was by Michael Pollan. The Kids' Keynote speaker was Kate DiCamillo. The public affairs keynote speaker was Anand Giridharadas.

Other featured presenters included Graham Allison, Lesley Nneka Arimah, Justine Bateman, Stephanie Burt, Eve Ewing, Yang Huang, Laura Koenig, Beth Macy, Monica Munoz Martinez, Alexandria Marzano-Lesnevich, Fatima Farheen Mirza, Sy Montgomery, Susan Oleksiw, James Sebenius, Wendy Sherman, Sree Sreenivasan, and Mo Walsh.

For a full list of presenters, visit Presenters – Boston Book Festival

=== 2017 ===
Featured presenters included: Graham Allison, M.T. Anderson, Stephanie Burt, Meghna Chakrabarti, Sonya Chung, Vicki Croke, Sari Edelstein, Hallie Ephron, Erica Ferencik, Meredith Goldstein, Krysten Hill, Ha Jin, Margot Kahn, Laura Koenig, Dennis Lehane, Marianne Leone, Kekla Magoon, Claire Messud, Celeste Ng, Erika L. Sanchez, Joanna Schaffhausen, Lemony Snicket, Mo Walsh, and Paul Yoon.

For a full list of presenters, visit Archive 2017 – Boston Book Festival

=== 2014 ===
There were five Keynotes including the Memoir Keynote by Herbie Hancock, Fiction Keynote by Susan Minot, History Keynote by Doris Kearns Goodwin, Kids’ Keynote by Rick Riordan, and art, architecture, and design keynote by Norman Foster.

Featured presenters included: Greeta Anand, Vikram Chandra, Vikas Swarup, Nicholas Carr, Andrew McAfee, David Rose, Benjamin Barber, Judith Donath, Howard Gardiner, Stanislas Dehaene, Daniel Dennett, Stacey D'Erasmo, Kate Racculia, Wesley Stace, Doug Most, Belinda Rathbone, Jenna Russell, Bob Ryan, Neil Swidey, Holly Black, Soman Chainani, Cassandra Clare, Gregory Maguire, Scott Anderson, Vicki Croke, Carl Hoffman, A.S. King, Scott Westerfeld, Meg Wolitzer, William Giraldi, Ben Mezrich, Lauren Oliver, Jennifer Finney Boylan, Margo Howard, Daniel Jones, Rebecca Mead, Joanna Rakoff, Max Tegmark, Lily King, Joseph O’Neil, and Rupert Thomson.

For a full list of presenters, visit Presenters – Boston Book Festival

=== 2013 ===
The Keynote was Salman Rushdie, with host Homi Bhabha. The Kid's Keynote was Tomie dePaola.

Featured presenters included: Emily Anthes, Jason Anthony, Nicholson Baker, Mike Barnicle, Madeleine Blais, Ty Burr, Vishaan Chakrabarti, Kevin Cullen, Alan Dershowitz, Erin Dionne, Andre Dubus III, Juan Enriquez, Noah Feldman, Thomas Fleming, Margalit Fox, Amity Gaige, Leigh Gallagher, Moses Gates, Nancy Gertner, Francesca Gino, Charles Graeber, Paul Harding, George Harrar, Harold Holzer, Miriam Karmel, Jessica Keener, Joshua Kendall, Chuck Klosterman, Barbara Krauthamer, Ann Leary, Wendy Mass, Ayana Mathis, Claire Messud, Leigh Montville, Abelardo Morell, Gregory Nagy, Michael Norton, Mirta Ojito, Richard Olivier, Tom Perrotta, Jamie Quatro, James Robinson, Clifford Ross, Nancy Jo Sales, Robert Shea, J. Courtney Sullivan, Anthony Tjan, Anthony Townsend, Craig Venter, Lesley Visser, Brenda Wineapple.

For a full list of presenters, visit https://web.archive.org/web/20140422232951/http://www.bostonbookfest.org/archives/#2013

=== 2012 ===
The Keynote was Richard Ford, with host Claire Messud. The Kid's Keynote was Lemony Snicket.

Featured presenters included: Peter Abrahams, M. T. Anderson, Gabrielle Bell, Barbara Berke, Buzz Bissinger, Kevin Bleyer, Charles Burns, Nancy L. Cohen, Rachel Cohn, Robert Darnton, Jacqueline Davies, Junot Díaz, Cory Doctorow, Esther Duflo, Jeffry Frieden, Alex Gilvarry, Edward Glaeser, Paul Grogan, Jennifer Haigh, Anita Hill, Philip Howard, Tayari Jones, Eric Kandel, Randall Kennedy, Chip Kidd, Madeleine Kunin, Ray Kurzweil, Dennis Lehane, Lawrence Lessig, Alan Lightman, Leslie Maitland, Ben Marcus, Andrew McAfee, Vahram Muratyan, Nicholas Negroponte, Edith Pearlman, Tom Perrotta, Michael E. Porter, Ayanna Pressley, Carmen M. Reinhart, Hanna Rosin, Michael Sandel, Alexander McCall Smith, Alexandra Styron, Baratunde Thurston, Lizz Winstead, Alex Witchel, Maryanne Wolf, and Gabrielle Zevin.

For a full list of presenters, visit https://web.archive.org/web/20140422232951/http://www.bostonbookfest.org/archives/#2012

=== 2011 ===
The Keynote was Michael Ondaatje, with host Homi Bhabha. The Kids' Keynote was Mo Willems.

Featured presenters included: Jabari Asim, Julia Alvarez, Sarah Bakewell, Sandra Beasley, Kate Beaton, Alison Bechdel, Idit Harel Caperton, Daniel Clowes, Kenneth C. Davis, Lawrence Douglas, Andre Dubus III, Jennifer Egan, Carlos Eire, Drew Gilpin Faust, Joseph Finder, Charles Bracelen Flood, Howard Gardner, Ethan Gilsdorf, Adam Goodheart, Stephen Greenblatt, Sue Hallowell, Chuck Hogan, Tony Horwitz, Maisie Houghton, Ben Ryder Howe, Michael D. Jackson, Chuck Klosterman, Jane Leavy, Gregory Maguire, Tom Matlack, Stephen McCauley, Sugata Mitra, Peter Mountford, Siddhartha Mukherjee, Nicholas Negroponte, Governor Deval Patrick, George Pelecanos, Lisa Randall, Emma Rothschild, Karen Russell, Seth, Glenn Stout, Sherry Turkle, Linda Urban, Thomas Whalen, Michael Willrich, Meg Wolitzer, and Mitchell Zuckoff.

For a full list of presenters, visit https://web.archive.org/web/20140422232951/http://www.bostonbookfest.org/archives/#2011

=== 2010 ===
The Keynote was Joyce Carol Oates and the Kids' Keynote was Jeff Kinney.

Featured presenters included: Susan Abulhawa, Dan Ariely, Nick Bilton, Lisa Birnbach, Bill Bryson, Noni Carter, Kristin Cashore, Justin Cronin, Jef Czekaj, Alan Dershowitz, David Edwards, Joshua Ferris, Tyler Florence, Atul Gawande, Myla Goldberg, Christina Gonzalez, Allegra Goodman, Jennifer Haigh, Tony Hiss, A.M. Homes, Michelle Hoover, Marlon James, Gish Jen, Steven Johnson, Kevin Kelly, Chip Kidd, David Kirkpatrick, Dennis Lehane, Simon Mawer, Richard Michelson, Mark Moffett, Dambisa Moyo, Nicholas Negroponte, Neri Oxman, Mitali Perkins, Tom Perrotta, Michael E. Porter, David Rakoff, John Rich, Michael Sandel, Juliet Schor, Amartya Sen, Brando Skyhorse, Jessica Stern, Joseph Stiglitz, and Lionel Vital.

For a full list of presenters, visit https://web.archive.org/web/20140422232951/http://www.bostonbookfest.org/archives/#2010

=== 2009 ===
The Keynote was Orhan Pamuk. The Kids' Keynote was Chris Van Allsburg.

Featured presenters included: Jack Beatty, Ken Burns, Carolina de Robertis, Anita Diamant, A. W. Flaherty, David Gergen, Lani Guinier, Steve Haber, John Hodgman, Jennie Israel, Mary Lou Jepsen, Neil Jones, Brewster Kahle, Tim Kring, Reif Larsen, Grace Lin, Elinor Lipman, Scott Magoon, Nicholas Negroponte, Elizabeth Nunez, Jon Orwant, Tom Perrotta, Michael E. Porter, Iqbal Quadir, Richard Russo, Anita Shreve, Alicia Silverstone, Michael Thomas, and Scout Tufankjian.

For a full list of presenters, visit https://web.archive.org/web/20140422232951/http://www.bostonbookfest.org/archives/#2009

== See also ==
- Books in the United States
