= Christopher Castellani =

American novelist

- Castellani at Boston Book Festival in 2026
- Born: 1972 (age 53–54); Wilmington, Delaware, U.S.
- Education: Swarthmore College (BA); Tufts University (MA); Boston University (MFA)
- Spouse: Michael Borum (2004 to present)

Christopher David Castellani (born 1972) is the author of four novels and a book of essays.

== Family and education ==
Christopher Castellani, the son of Italian immigrants, was born and raised in Wilmington, Delaware, and graduated from Salesianum School in 1990. He holds a B.A. in English literature from Swarthmore College, an M.A. in English literature from Tufts University, and an M.F.A. in creative writing from Boston University. He resides in Boston, Massachusetts. He has been married to Michael Borum since May 21, 2004.

== Novels and other publications ==
Castellani is the author of four novels. His first book, A Kiss from Maddalena, won the 2004 Massachusetts Book Award. That novel and his next two, The Saint of Lost Things and All This Talk of Love, are devoted to the same Italian-American family and constitute, in one reviewer's phrase, "something of an opera buffa of the immigrant experience". He is also the author of The Art of Perspective: Who Tells the Story, an installment in the writing craft series from Graywolf Press. His short fiction and essays have been included in several anthologies.

Castellani's most recent book, Leading Men, is a fictionalized telling of the relationship between Tennessee Williams and Frank Merlo. New York Times book critic Dwight Garner said the novel "casts a spell right from the start" and "to hold it in your hands is like holding...a front-row opera ticket." Also in the Times, novelist David Leavitt called it "intricately designed as a Lego kit" and said "engineering may be the aspect of novel writing that deserves the most praise and gets the least, and Castellani is a first-rate engineer." The novel is divided into two narratives and includes the full text of an invented, and intentionally bad, Tennessee Williams play. Leading Men is currently being adapted into a feature film by Searchlight Pictures with a screenplay by playwright Matthew Lopez (writer). The film is being produced by Peter Spears and directed by Luca Guadagnino.

== Academic and professional career ==
Castellani taught English literature at Tufts University (1997–2000) and creative writing as a visiting professor at Swarthmore College (2007). In 2004 and 2005, Castellani was a Fellow at the Bread Loaf Writers' Conference at Middlebury College, and has served on the Bread Loaf faculty as well as the faculty of the Fine Arts Work Center in Provincetown, MA. He is the former artistic director of the creative writing non-profit GrubStreet, and serves on the faculty of the Warren Wilson College MFA Program for Writers. From 2022 to 2024, Castellani was the Fannie Hurst Writer in Residence at Brandeis University.

As a result of the lawsuits between writers Sonya Larson and Dawn Dorland described in a 2021 New York Times article Who Is the Bad Art Friend, some of Castellani's private emails were made public, including one where Castellani wrote of Dorland, "my mission in life is going to be to exact revenge on this pestilence of a person." GrubStreet director Eve Bridburg publicly expressed concern that Castellani's comments had "caused distrust and concern in our community." Castellani published an apology to the GrubStreet community, expressing regret for his words and saying, "I wrote some of those unprofessional emails as an admittedly hyperbolic, deliberatively provocative, and highly performative way of supporting my friend and fellow writer."

== Awards ==
- Massachusetts Book Award, 2004
- Guggenheim Fellowship, 2014
- Poets & Writers: Barnes & Noble Writers for Writers Award, 2015
- Massachusetts Cultural Council Fellowship, 2016
- National Endowment for the Arts Fellowship, 2024

== Writings ==
=== Novels ===
- A Kiss from Maddalena, Algonquin Books, 2003
- The Saint of Lost Things, Algonquin Books, 2005
- All This Talk of Love, Algonquin Books, 2013
- Leading Men, Viking Books, 2019
- Last Seen, Viking Books, 2026

=== Short fiction ===
- "The Living," Ploughshares, 2013

=== Non-fiction ===
- The Art of Perspective: Who Tells the Story, Graywolf Press, 2016

=== Anthologies and essays ===
- Now Write! Fiction Writing Exercises from Today's Best Writers and Teachers, Sherry Ellis, ed., Tarcher Books, 2006
- Naming the World: And Other Exercises for the Creative Writer, Bret Anthony Johnston, ed., Random House, 2008
- Mentors, Muses & Monsters, Elizabeth Benedict, ed., Excelsior Editions, 2012
