= GrubStreet =

Boston-based creative writing center

GrubStreet, Inc. is a non-profit creative writing center located in Boston, Massachusetts that hosts workshops, seminars, consultations, and similar events. It also offer scholarships.

In October 2021, several members of GrubStreet leadership were involved in a controversy surrounding the alleged plagiarism of the work of a former student and instructor by Sonya Larson, then-director of the center's annual Muse Conference.

== History ==
GrubStreet was founded in 1997 in Boston, Massachusetts by Eve Bridburg. At first, GrubStreet had two instructors (Bridburg one of them), teaching eight students in workshops centered on fiction. By 2001 GrubStreet had nearly 100 students, more than a dozen instructors, and courses in poetry, screenwriting, nonfiction, and playwriting. GrubStreet became a nonprofit in 2002.

Beginning in 2012, GrubStreet led a coalition promoting a "Literary Cultural District," which would include "some 80 literary landmarks in downtown Boston, Back Bay, and Beacon Hill," according to Boston Magazine. The coalition was led by GrubStreet but included other partners, including the Boston Public Library, the Boston Book Festival, and Emerson College. In October 2014, the Massachusetts Cultural Council officially recognized Boston's Literary Cultural District.

In 2018, GrubStreet was chosen by the Boston Planning & Development Agency to get construction funding and below-market rent for moving from its 3,500-square-foot headquarters in Boston's Back Bay to a 13,000-square-foot space in a luxury condo building in the Seaport District. GrubStreet, which had already received a $2 million grant from the Calderwood Charitable Foundation for the transition, said that it would still need to raise "substantial funds" for the move. In 2019, after successfully raising $8 million, GrubStreet relocated to the Seaport District.

=== Controversy ===
In October 2021, GrubStreet came under scrutiny after journalist Robert Kolker wrote a piece for The New York Times magazine detailing the multi-year ongoing litigation between two Grubstreet employees: Muse & Marketplace director Sonya Larson and former Grubstreet student Dawn Dorland. Dorland had accused Larson of plagiarism based on her use of a letter, written by Dorland, in a published short story; this accusation prompted Larson to sue Dorland for defamation. Kolker's piece brought new attention to text messages and emails exchanged by GrubStreet employees and leader who were close friends and colleagues of Larson's, including GrubStreet's artistic director Christopher Castellani.

In response to concerns expressed by its members, GrubStreet launched an investigation. On October 29, 2021, GrubStreet announced that, based on a third party review, it had asked not only Sonya Larson but also Director of Online Learning Alison Murphy and board member Jennifer De Leon to step down from their leadership roles. Castellani, who stayed on, posted a letter on the official GrubStreet website, expressing regret for causing Dawn Dorland personal hurt.

== Muse & the Marketplace ==
The Muse and the Marketplace is an annual weekend-long writer's symposium hosted by GrubStreet. In 2010, it was attended by over 900 writers and publishing professionals.

Many authors, agents, and editors have been involved with GrubStreet's Muse and the Marketplace. In 2010, Chuck Palahniuk was the keynote speaker. In 2013, the keynote speaker was Amanda Palmer.

Muse and the Marketplace was cancelled in 2020 due to the COVD-19 pandemic, but was held virtually in 2021, with panelists including Alexander Chee, Vievee Francis, and Nick Flynn.

== GrubStreet Book Prize ==
Between 2007 and 2015, GrubStreet awarded prizes to a writer publishing his/her second book or beyond. As the goal of the prize was to bring writers to Boston, only writers whose primary residence was not Massachusetts, Vermont, Maine, New Hampshire, Connecticut, or Rhode Island were eligible. The award was discontinued in 2015.

Previous Book Prize winners include:

=== 2007 ===
- Fiction: Sheri Joseph, Stray (MacAdam/Cage)
- Poetry: Linda Gregg, In the Middle Distance (Graywolf Press)
- Non-Fiction: Susan Richards Shreve, Warm Springs: Traces of a Childhood at FDR’s Polio Haven (Houghton Mifflin Harcourt)

=== 2008 ===
- Fiction: Joshua Furst, The Sabotage Café (Alfred A. Knopf)
- Poetry: Rebecca Seiferle, Wild Tongue (Copper Canyon Press)
- Non-Fiction: Dinty W. Moore, Between Panic and Desire (University of Nebraska Press)

=== 2009 ===
- Fiction: Alan Cheuse, To Catch Lightning (Sourcebooks)
- Poetry: Rick Barot, Want (Sarabande Books)
- Non-Fiction: Not awarded

=== 2010 ===
- Fiction: Vestal McIntyre, Lake Overturn (Harper Perennial)
- Poetry: Debra Allbery, Finbul-Winter (Four Way Books)
- Non-Fiction: Rahna Reiko Rizzuto, Hiroshima in the Morning (The Feminist Press)

=== 2011 ===
- Non-Fiction Winner: Wendy Call, No Word for Welcome: The Mexican Village Faces the Global Economy (The University of Nebraska Press)
- Finalist: Sandra Beasley, Don’t Kill the Birthday Girl: Tales from an Allergic Life (Crown Publishing)
- Finalist: Daniele Cadena Deulen, The Riots (University of Georgia Press)

=== 2012 ===
- Fiction Winner: Eileen Pollack, Breaking and Entering (Four Way Books)
- Honorable Mention: Mandy Keifetz, Flea Circus: A Bestiary of Grief (New Issues)
- Honorable Mention: Valerie Laken, Separate Kingdoms (Harper Perennial)
- Honorable Mention: Scott Nadelsom, Aftermath (Hawthorne)

=== 2013 ===
- Non-Fiction Winner: Ellen Cassedy, We Are Here: Memories of the Lithuanian Holocaust (The University of Nebraska Press)

=== 2014 ===
- Poetry Winner: Rob Schlegel, January Machine (Four Way Books)

=== 2015 ===
- Fiction Winner: Josh Weil, The Great Glass Sea (Grove Atlantic)
