= Who Is the Bad Art Friend? =

2021 feature story

Lead image of the story, by Pablo Delcan

"Who Is the Bad Art Friend?" is a 2021 New York Times Magazine feature story by Robert Kolker about a feud between two writers, Dawn Dorland and Sonya Larson. The piece focused on accusations that GrubStreet employee Sonya Larson had included a letter written by former GrubStreet instructor Dawn Dorland in her short story The Kindest. Though Dorland and Larson had been involved in ongoing lawsuits since 2018 and the story of their feud had been covered by the media before, Kolker's piece went viral and led to ongoing scrutiny of the case.

== Background ==
Kolker's article centers around two writers and a short story, "The Kindest", published by one of them but contested by the other. Dawn Dorland and Sonya Larson met sometime around 2007 at Boston's GrubStreet Writing Center. Dorland was at first a student and later a workshop leader there, while Larson was until recently the director of GrubStreet's Muse in the Marketplace conference. Larson, who grew up in Minnesota with a white father and a Chinese-American mother, has published both fiction and non-fiction, winning some awards. Dorland, who now lives in California, is at work on a novel inspired by her hardscrabble Iowa upbringing.

The contested story, which Sonya Larson published in two different audio versions and in the 2017 edition of American Short Fiction, is about a working-class Chinese-American woman named Chuntao, an alcoholic who gets a kidney donation from a wealthy white woman who then feels entitled to pester Chuntao. According to Larson, whose work often treats racial issues, the story is a critique of "white-savior dynamics".

Kolker begins his article by describing Dawn Dorland ("openhearted and eager", although he says that some people find her "a little extra") who gave one of her kidneys to a stranger with kidney failure. The wife of her kidney recipient (who was not a compatible donor for her husband) gave one of her kidneys to yet another person in need—this is called a "chain donation". After Dawn Dorland's surgery, she drafted a letter to the person at the end of the "chain"—that is, the person who needed a kidney but had no friend or family member willing to give one. Kolker, calling the letter "heartfelt", quotes from it at length:

Personally, my childhood was marked by trauma and abuse; I didn't have the opportunity to form secure attachments with my family of origin. A positive outcome of my early life is empathy, that it opened a well of possibility between me and strangers. While perhaps many more people would be motivated to donate an organ to a friend or family member in need, to me, the suffering of strangers is just as real.

Dorland posted the letter to a private Facebook group she had created, before her surgery, for family and friends who wanted to get updates and offer support. Even before her June 24, 2015 surgery, Dorland noticed that one person in the group was reading every post but not interacting. That group member was Sonya Larson. Unsure what it meant, Dorland sent her an email in August, eventually getting a reply that described her kidney donation as "a tremendous thing." Six weeks after her surgery, Dorland made her first public posting to Facebook about her kidney donation.

In October, 2015, Sonya Larson sent out to "Chunky Monkeys" (a friend-group of successful writers working at GrubStreet) the first draft of her story "The Kindest", where a young Chinese-American woman gets a kidney transplant and later a visit from the kidney donor, a narcissistic and annoying white woman whose name is Dawn Rothario. Next day, one group member texted to say, "I'm now following Dawn Dorland's kidney posts with creepy fascination." Another later remembered, "everybody in that workshop immediately recognized dawn dorland in the story..."

On the advice of her writing group, Larson changed the character's name from "Dawn" to "Rose". But she had trouble modifying the text of a letter, included in her story, sent by kidney donor "Rose" to her recipient, saying in January, 2016, "it literally has sentences that I verbatim grabbed from Dawn's letter on FB. I've tried to change it but I can't seem to." Kolker's 2021 story included one paragraph of the letter as Audible recorded it in 2016:

My own childhood was marked by trauma and abuse; I wasn't given an opportunity to form secure attachments with my family of origin. But in adulthood that experience provided a strong sense of empathy. While others might desire to give to a family member or friend, to me the suffering of strangers is just as real.

In June, 2016, Dorland wrote to Larson: "Hey, I heard you wrote a kidney-donation story. Cool! Can I read it?" Larson pushed back, in the email exchange that followed, until Dorland accepted her refusal. Although the magazine American Short Fiction published "The Kindest" in August, 2017, Dorland did not read it until June, 2018, when it was made available for free online. As the Boston Globe describes Dorland's reaction, "she was surprised to find a donor letter in Larson's fiction that bore striking similarities to her own. Dorland's feeling of personal betrayal turned to professional indignation."

== Writing process ==
Although the underlying story received some press attention in 2018, when the Boston Book Festival canceled its One City One Story event due to plagiarism concerns, Kolker first learned of it in January 2021, when Dawn Dorland wrote to ask him to take a look at the ongoing legal tangle. In an email Kolker described as "straightforward", Dorland wrote:

This dispute, on top of just being surreal, has cost my family a lot of money we didn't have...And, as I am learning now through the legal discovery process, cost me my writing community back in Boston, where I cut my teeth as a writer.

According to Kolker, he pitched the story to his New York Times Magazine editor as a non-judgmental account of a complex dispute. He and his editor agreed on "a story that would present both Ms. Dorland's and Ms. Larson's side faithfully, while explaining to readers how, moment by moment, all of this unfolded."

Kolker worked to establish "trust and understanding" with both Dorland and Larson in off-the-record interviews, before beginning work on the story in February.

On October 5, 2021, Kolker described his about-to-be published story on his Twitter account as "Plenty of plot twists in my new story in this weekend's @NYTmag—a writing-world potboiler about inspiration and appropriation (and litigation)."

== Aftermath ==
=== Reception ===
After Kolker's article appeared (October 5, 2021), response to it was called "viral". Elizabeth Bruenig in The Atlantic (October 7, 2021), said, "The story swiftly became an obsession among the very online, as readers debated its moral and meaning."

WBUR summed up the online debate as follows:

The Dorland-like character in "The Kindest"—which Larson has said was only partly modeled on Dorland—is portrayed as an entitled egotist with a white savior complex whose altruism contains hidden motives. Whether this seemingly thinly-veiled takedown of the real-life Dorland was warranted was hotly debated online. Some saw Dorland as a desperate narcissist who only donated her kidney for praise and adulation. Others saw Larson as a cruel opportunist who exploited a friendship for personal gain. Some found fault in the actions of both women.

Some commentators criticized the article for its effect on Dorland and Larson. According to Louise Perry in New Statesman, while Dorland and Larson got harsh treatment from "the internet's kangaroo court...There is only one winner from this story: Robert Kolker." WGBH quoted Brianna Wu asking if the story's publication was "really worth the damage that they've done to these two women's lives?" In a follow-up NYT story (October 20, 2021), Kolker expressed concern that some of his readers were "identifying emotionally with one side—and getting mad," saying "I feel that a lot of the debate that continues to swirl across Twitter risks flattening the piece into a tale of good guys and bad guys."

=== Other related coverage ===
Hollywood Reporter (November 3, 2021) published a column by a lawyer and a law student, "Who is the bad copyright friend?", examining Larson's claim that what Dorland called plagiarism of her letter was really "fair use". Referencing a side-by-side graphic of the two letters that had been posted by Twitter user "Kidneygate", the authors concluded that Larson would face "an uphill battle to convince a jury." (Note: On September 14, 2023, the U.S. District Court for the District of Massachusetts ruled that Larson's story was protected by fair use, but that Larson was not defamed by Dorland.)

The text of Larson's story The Kindest was among the court documents. It was reviewed unfavorably by The New Yorker staff writer Katy Waldman, who criticized the story's "cartoon of the donor character," adding "the prose is bad."

=== Investigation by Grubstreet ===
On October 12, GrubStreet announced they would hire an expert to look into the ongoing dispute, saying, "Bluntly, we are appalled by the disconnect between GrubStreet's stated values and the alleged behavior by some that has come to light." According to Publishers Weekly, "the involvement of so many leaders in the organization's community—and the release of potentially disparaging emails by them—prompted an internal review."

On October 29, 2021, Eve Bridburg announced that Larson and two of her colleagues (Alison Murphy and board member Jennifer De Leon) would leave their leadership positions at GrubStreet, but Artistic Director Christopher Castellani would remain in his role. In private correspondence with Larson and the Chunky Monkeys writing group that was released as part of discovery during the trial, Castellani had written of Dorland, "my mission in life is going to be to exact revenge on this pestilence of a person".
