= G. P. Putnam's Sons Sue Grafton Memorial Award =

Annual literary award

The G. P. Putnam's Sons Sue Grafton Memorial Award was established in 2019 to honor Sue Grafton and is presented to "the best novel in a series featuring a female protagonist." It is presented annually as part of the Edgar Awards on behalf of the Mystery Writers of America.

== Recipients ==
Award winners and shortlists
Year	Author	Title	Result	Ref.
2019	Sara Paretsky	Shell Game	Winner	
2019	Lisa Black	Perish	Shortlist	
2019	Victoria Thompson	City of Secrets	Shortlist	
2019	Charles Todd	A Forgotten Place	Shortlist	
2019	Jacqueline Winspear	To Die but Once	Shortlist	
2020	Tracy Clark	Borrowed Time	Winner	
2020	Linda Castillo	Shamed	Shortlist	
2020	Edwin Hill	The Missing Ones	Shortlist	
2020	Tara Laskowski	One Night Gone	Shortlist	
2020	Gigi Pandian	The Alchemist's Illusion	Shortlist	
2020	Marcie R. Rendon	Girl Gone Missing	Shortlist	
2021	Rosalie Knecht	Vera Kelly is Not a Mystery	Winner	
2021	Kathleen Kent	The Burn	Shortlist	
2021	Laurie R. King	Riviera Gold	Shortlist	
2021	Sara Paretsky	Dead Land	Shortlist	
2021	Ilaria Tuti	The Sleeping Nymph	Shortlist	
2021	James W. Ziskin	Turn to Stone	Shortlist	
2022	Tracy Clark	Runner	Winner	
2022	Elizabeth Breck	Double Take	Shortlist	
2022	Thomas Kies	Shadow Hill	Shortlist	
2022	Kwei Quartey	Sleep Well, My Lady	Shortlist	
2022	S. J. Rozan	Family Business	Shortlist	
2023	Louisa Luna	Hideout	Winner	
2023	Mark de Castrique	Secret Lives	Shortlist	
2023	Claire Kells	An Unforgiving Place	Shortlist	
2023	Emilya Naymark	Behind the Lie	Shortlist	
2023	Stephen Spotswood	Secrets Typed in Blood	Shortlist	
2024	Linda Castillo	An Evil Heart	Winner	
2024	Samantha Jayne Allen	Hard Rain	Shortlist	
2024	Susan Isaacs	Bad, Bad Seymour Brown	Shortlist	
2024	Val McDermid	Past Lying	Shortlist	
2024	Sarah Stewart Taylor	A Stolen Child	Shortlist	
2025	Jacqueline Winspear	The Comfort of Ghosts	Winner	
2025	Kelley Armstrong	Disturbing the Dead	Shortlist	
2025	Clare Mackintosh	A Game of Lies	Shortlist	
2025	Beverly McLachlin	Proof	Shortlist	
2025	Mindy Mejia	A World of Hurt	Shortlist	
2025	Joanna Schaffhausen	All the Way Gone	Shortlist	
2026	Joanna Schaffhausen	Gone in the Night	Winner	
2026	Kelley Armstrong	Cold as Hell	Shortlist	
2026	Linda Castillo	Rage: A Novel	Shortlist	
2026	Lee Goldberg	Fallen Star	Shortlist	
2026	Daniel G. Miller	The Red Letter	Shortlist	
