= Yang Huang =

American novelist and short story writer (born 1971)

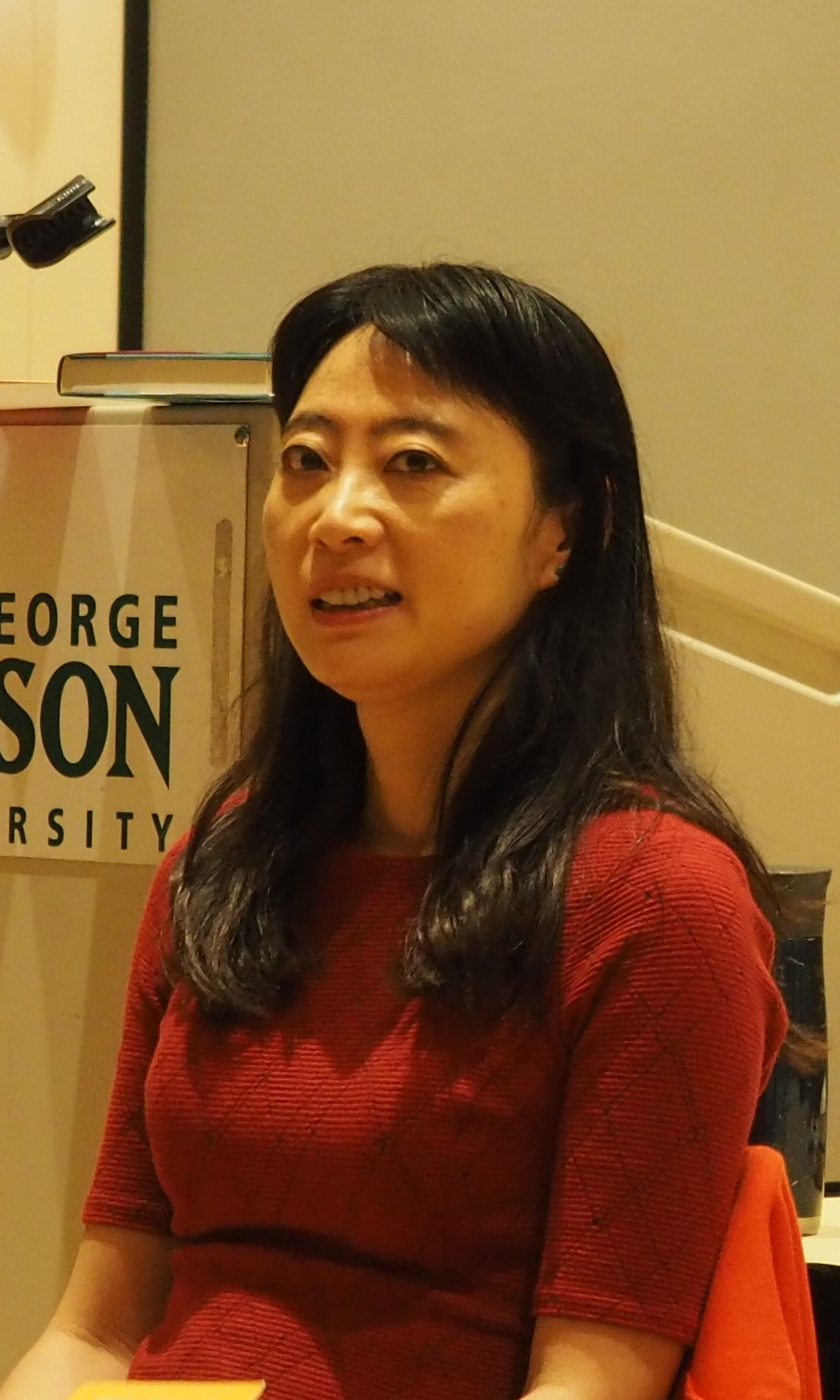
- Born: June 13, 1971 (age 55); Jiangsu, China
- Education: Tongji University; Florida Atlantic University (BS, BA); Boston College (MA); University of Arizona (MFA)
- Occupation: Writer

Yang Huang (born June 13, 1971) is an American novelist and short story writer. Her fiction focuses on the intergenerational drama post-Tiananmen China.

Her debut novel, Living Treasures, was a finalist for the 2008 Bellwether Prize and the 2014 INDIEFAB Book of the Year Awards (now known as the Foreword INDIES). Her short story collection, My Old Faithful, won 2017 Juniper Prize for Fiction. her novel, My Good Son, was the winner of 2020 University of New Orleans Publishing Lab Prize.

== Early life and education ==
Yang Huang studied applied physics at Tongji University from 1988 to 1990, received a B.S in computer science in 1993 and B.A. in English literature in 1996 from Florida Atlantic University, an M.A in English literature from Boston College in 1998, and an MFA in creative writing from University of Arizona in 2000.

Her stories have been featured in The Asian Pacific American Journal, Stories for Film, FUTURES, Porcupine Literary Arts Magazine, Nuvein Magazine, and The Evansville Review.

Her short story "A Spell of Spring Dream" was nominated for the Pushcart prize.

Yang Huang works at UC Berkeley. She lives in the San Francisco Bay Area, USA. She is married with two children.

== Works ==
- Living Treasures; Harvard Square Editions 2014, ISBN 978-0-9895960-5-3
- My Old Faithful: Stories (Juniper Prize for Fiction); University of Massachusetts Press (February 2, 2018),ISBN 978-1625343369
- My Good Son: A Novel; University of New Orleans Press (May 27, 2021) ISBN 978-1608012015
