= Marcie Rendon =

Native American author

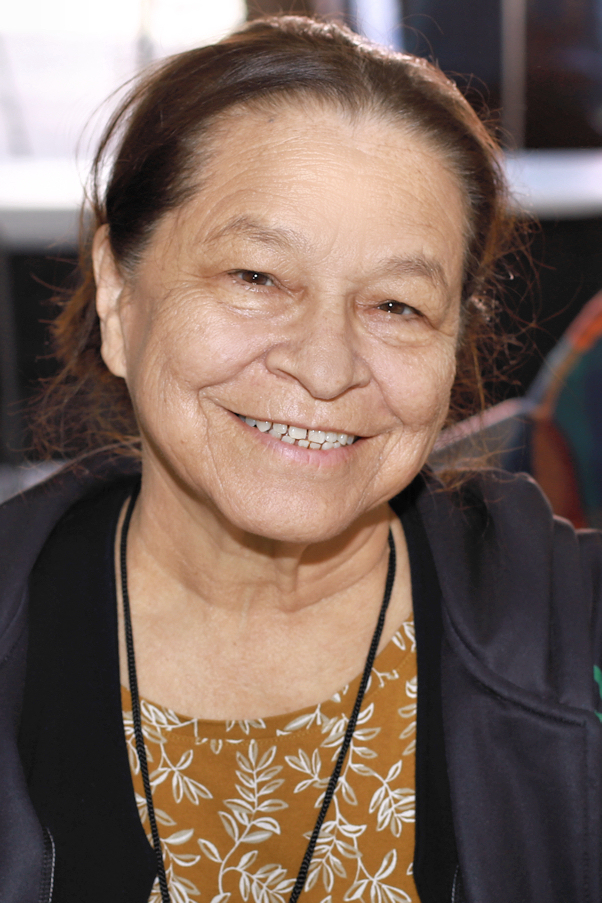
- Marcie Rendon at the 2022 Texas Book Festival
- Born: 1952 (age 73–74)
- Education: Moorhead State University (BA); Saint Mary's University of Minnesota (MA)
- Occupations: Playwright; poet; writer
- Writing career
- Language: English
- Genres: Juvenile nonfiction, crime fiction
- Notable awards: McKnight Foundation's Distinguished Artist Award (2020)
- Website: marcierendon.com

Marcie Rendon (born 1952) is a Native American playwright, poet, author, and community arts activist based in Minneapolis. She is an enrolled member of the White Earth Band of the Minnesota Chippewa Tribe.

Rendon founded Raving Native Productions theater. Along with various plays, screenplays, poems, and short stories, she has written two nonfiction books for children and five crime fiction novels. Her first novel Murder on the Red River won the 2018 Pinckley Prize for Debut Crime Fiction. Her second novel Girl Gone Missing was shortlisted for the 2020 G. P. Putnam's Sons Sue Grafton Memorial Award. Her most well-known theatre work is Free Frybread, a mock telethon play which satirizes the American prison system and its treatment of Native Americans.

== Early life and education ==
Rendon was born in Norman County, Minnesota in 1952.

Rendon graduated from Moorhead State University in 1975 with two Bachelor of Arts degrees, in criminal justice and Indian studies. In 1991 she graduated with a Master of Arts in human development from Saint Mary's University of Minnesota.

== Career ==
In the early 1990s, Rendon won the Loft’s Inroads Writers of Color Award and was mentored by Anishinaabe writer Jim Northrup. She founded Raving Native Productions in 1996.

In 2016, Rendon received the Loft's Spoken Word Immersion fellowship. In 2017, her poetry appeared in the Saint Paul Almanac's Impressions project.

In June 2019, Rendon was featured in Visual Collaborative's Polaris catalogue as part of the Voyager series for humanities. Rendon was the first Native American woman to receive the McKnight Foundation's 2020 Distinguished Artist Award.

== Awards and honors ==
- 1997: Nomination for Notable Children's Trade Book in the Field of Social Sciences (Pow Wow Summer)
- 2002: Ohio Farm Bureau Federation Award (Farmer's Market)
- 2002: Wisconsin Library Association Outstanding Youth Selection (Farmer's Market)
- 2018: Pinckley Prize for Debut Crime Fiction (Murder on the Red River)
- 2020: McKnight Foundation's Distinguished Artist Award
- 2020: Honorary Doctor of Humane Letters from Adler University
- 2025: Nomination for Minnesota Book Award for Genre Fiction (Where They Last Saw Her)

== Works ==
=== Children's nonfiction ===
- Powwow Summer: A Family Celebrates the Circle of Life (1996, Carolrhoda Books)
- Farmer's Market: Families Working Together (2001, Carolrhoda Books)

=== Crime fiction ===
- Murder on the Red River (2017, Cinco Puntos Press, republished by Soho Press in 2022)
- Girl Gone Missing (2019, Cinco Puntos Press, republished by Soho Press in 2022)
- Sinister Graves (2022, Soho Press)
- Where They Last Saw Her (2024, Bantam Books)
- Broken Fields (2025, Soho Press)

=== Short stories ===
- "Wingless" in Never Whistle at Night: An Indigenous Dark Fiction Anthology (ed. Shane Hawk and Theodore C. Van Alst Jr., 2023, Vintage Books)
