= Hidden Valley Road =

Book by Robert Kolker

Hidden Valley Road: Inside the Mind of an American Family
- Cover of first edition
- Author: Robert Kolker
- Audio read by: Sean Pratt
- Cover artist: Air Force photo, 1961; John Fontana (design)
- Language: English
- Subjects: Galvin family; schizophrenia
- Publisher: Doubleday
- Publication date: April 7, 2020
- Publication place: United States
- Media type: Print (hardcover and paperback), e-book, audiobook
- Pages: 400
- ISBN: 978-0-385-54376-7 (hardcover)
- OCLC: 1148170726
- Dewey Decimal: 616.89/80092
- LC Class: RC514 .K648 2020

Hidden Valley Road: Inside the Mind of an American Family is a 2020 non-fiction book by Robert Kolker. The book is an account of the Galvin family of Colorado Springs, Colorado, a mid 20th-century American family with twelve children (ten boys and two girls), six of whom were diagnosed with schizophrenia (notably all boys). The family became the subject of researchers investigating a genetic origin for schizophrenia.

The book was selected for the revival of Oprah's Book Club. It debuted at number one on the New York Times nonfiction bestseller list. The book was also named one of "The 10 Best Books of 2020" by The New York Times Book Review and as one of the year's most critically acclaimed non-fiction books.

Robert Kolker was originally approached by the two Galvin sisters, Margaret Galvin Johnson and Lindsay (née Mary) Galvin Rauch, to write about the family's struggle and ordeal; he used it as a backdrop to explore the medical research and understanding about mental illness. Kolker interviewed family matriarch Mimi Galvin as part of his research; she shared the various theories and rumors that had spread about their family and how they all struggled to get answers about the condition.

Studies implicated two genes, SHANK2 and CHRNA7, which were passed on to the boys from their mother.

== Plot ==
Hidden Valley Road is a true story about the Galvin family, an American family from Colorado with twelve children, six of whom are diagnosed with schizophrenia. The eldest, Donald Galvin, was born in 1945, and the youngest, Mary (who later changed her name to Lindsay) was born in 1965. By the mid-1970s, six of the ten boys (Donald, James, Brian, Joseph, Matthew and Peter) were diagnosed with schizophrenia. The Galvins became one of the first families to be studied by the National Institute of Mental Health, with their DNA samples and experiences forming the cornerstone of research for the disease in the mid-1900s.

== Reception ==
Kirkus Reviews praised its "astounding depth and empathy" and Kolker's account of schizophrenia's history and the complicated atmosphere and relationships among members of the Galvin family.

In a review for The New York Times, Sam Dolnick wrote, "Kolker tells their story with great compassion" and that the author "is a restrained and unshowy writer who is able to effectively set a mood".

Similarly, in her review for The Washington Post, Karen Iris Tucker described Kolker's retelling of the Galvin family as "deeply compassionate and chilling," further noting that "the book gives much space to how difficult the disease has been to diagnose and treat. Yet it ends in 2017, as a story of hope."

Publishers Weekly called the book a "haunting and memorable" account of multi-generational mental illness and praised Kolker's "taut and often heartbreaking narrative." Former president Barack Obama listed the book as one of his favorite books of 2020 on social media on December 17, 2020.

== See also ==
- Genain quadruplets - Another sibling group whose studies focused on the genetic component of schizophrenia
