= Fantasy Freaks and Gaming Geeks =

- Author: Ethan Gilsdorf
- Language: English
- Genre: travel literature, memoir, immersion journalism
- Publisher: Lyons Press
- Publication date: 2009
- Publication place: United States
- Media type: Print (Hardcover)
- Pages: 320 pp
- ISBN: 978-1-59921-480-1

Fantasy Freaks and Gaming Geeks (full title: Fantasy Freaks and Gaming Geeks: An Epic Quest for Reality Among Role Players, Online Gamers, and Other Dwellers of Imaginary Realms) is a book by author Ethan Gilsdorf and a work of travel literature, memoir and immersion journalism that explores fantasy and gaming subcultures.

The book was first published in 2009 by the Lyons Press.

== Reception ==
Several newspapers, magazines and online publications have favorably reviewed Fantasy Freaks and Gaming Geeks, including wired.com, The Boston Globe, National Public Radio and The Huffington Post.

As of December 2014, the ebook version of the book available on Amazon.com had a rating of 3.8 out of 5 stars.

== Reviews ==
- Realms of Fantasy
