= Robert Kolker =

American journalist

- Born: Baltimore, Maryland, US
- Education: Columbia University (BA)
- Occupations: writer, journalist
- Spouse: Kirsten Danis
- Writing career
- Genre: Long-form journalism
- Notable work: Hidden Valley Road

Robert Kolker is an American journalist and contributor to The New York Times Magazine who previously worked as a contributing editor at New York Magazine and projects and investigations reporter for Bloomberg News and Bloomberg Businessweek.

He is the author of Lost Girls, a New York Times best-selling true crime book that was named one of Publishers Weekly's Top Ten Books of 2013. In 2020, his book Hidden Valley Road was published and was selected for the revival of Oprah's Book Club.

== Early life and education ==
Kolker is a native of Columbia, Maryland. His mother was a counselor at Howard County General Hospital and father worked as a homebuilder. He attended Wilde Lake High School and graduated from Columbia College of Columbia University in 1991.

== Career ==
=== Longform journalism ===
As a journalist, Kolker's work has appeared in New York Magazine, The Atlantic, Bloomberg Businessweek, The New York Times Magazine, Wired, GQ, O, The Oprah Magazine, and The Marshall Project. His work often takes the form of reported narratives. His 2006 investigation into sexual abuse in the ultra-Orthodox Jewish community in Brooklyn helped bring an abuser to justice and was nominated for a National Magazine Award. His exploration of an eighteen-year murder-exoneration case and the police tactics that can lead to false confessions received the John Jay/Harry Frank Guggenheim 2011 Excellence in Criminal Justice Reporting Award.

Kolker's 2004 story in New York Magazine about a public-school embezzlement scandal was adapted for the feature film Bad Education, starring Hugh Jackman. The film had its world premiere at the Toronto International Film Festival on September 8, 2019 before its rights were acquired by HBO.

In 2021 Kolker wrote the piece "Who Is the Bad Art Friend?" for The New York Times Magazine. The piece focused on the years long litigation between two former employees of Boston based writing center GrubStreet: Dawn Dorland, a former writing instructor and kidney donor, and Sonya Larson, a promising young writer accused of plagiarizing Dorland. The piece went viral and renewed attention to the case led to the dismissal of Sonya Larson and several of her friends, also implicated in the dispute, from their positions at GrubStreet.

He teaches at Columbia Journalism School.

=== Lost Girls ===
Kolker's 2013 book Lost Girls recounts the lives of five sex workers murdered by the Long Island serial killer, and the story of the hunt for the as-yet-unidentified killer. It also explores the implications of the emergence of on-line personal ads as a major vehicle for sex work. The book received wide critical acclaim.

Lost Girls was adapted for the 2020 feature film Lost Girls, directed by Liz Garbus and starring Amy Ryan.

=== Hidden Valley Road ===
Kolker's 2020 book Hidden Valley Road is the nonfiction account of the Galvins, a midcentury American family, with twelve children. The oldest son, Donald Jr. was diagnosed with schizophrenia, and then five more of his brothers were as well. The Galvins became science’s great hope in the quest to understand the disease. Kolker was originally approached by the two Galvin sisters to write their family story, and interviewed Mimi Galvin as part of his research and writing. The book was listed by The New York Times as one of the "10 Best Books" of 2020 and one of the "Best Higher Education Books of 2020" by Forbes.

=== The Vanishing Family ===
His 2026 book The Vanishing Family is a non-fiction book about a family dealing with genetic frontotemporal dementia.

== Personal life ==
Kolker is married to Kirsten Danis, an editor at The New York Times and former managing editor of The Marshall Project, whom he met at Columbia. Danis was also the editor-in-chief of the Columbia Daily Spectator.
