= Post Road (magazine) =

American literary magazine

- Editor: Jaime Clarke & David Ryan
- Categories: Literary journal
- Frequency: Biannual
- Publisher: Boston College
- Founded: 1999
- Country: United States
- Language: English
- Website: www.postroadmag.com
- ISSN: 1531-4073
- OCLC: 44875434

Post Road is an American literary magazine established in 1999 that publishes fiction, nonfiction, criticism, poetry, art, and theatre. In addition to these traditional genres, the magazine also features a "Recommendations" section in which established writers suggest their favorite work and an "Etcetera" section which presents literary curiosities such as letters, reprints, and interviews. Post Road is published biannually by the Department of English at Boston College.

== History ==
The magazine was established in New York City in 1999 by Sean Burke, Jaime Clarke and David Ryan. Editors emeritus include Sean Burke (1999–2001), Jaime Clarke (1999–2008), Mary Cotton, as Publisher and Managing Editor (2004–2008), Erin Falkevitz (2005–2006), Alden Jones (2002–2004), Fiona Maazel (2001–2002), Marcus McGraw (2003–2004), Catherine Parnell, as Managing Editor (2003), and Samantha Pitchel (2006–2008). From 2006 to 2008, the magazine partnered with Lesley University. Since 2008, it has been housed at Boston College.

== Awards and praise ==
Tom Perrotta's story The Smile on Happy Chang's Face, which first appeared in issue 8, was included in Best American Short Stories 2005 and has been chosen for the 2010 Boston Book Festival's “One City One Story” program. Stories, essays, and poems from the magazine have also been included in Pushcart Prize anthologies, received honorable mentions for the O. Henry Prize, and been selected for Best American Essays, Best American Travel Writing, and Best American Poetry.

Nina MacLaughlin, in her 2004 review of the publication for Boston's The Phoenix, says that the magazine "exudes experimental vigor without succumbing to the temptation of being edgy for the sake of edginess." In 2008, The Boston Globe's Tracy Slater identified Post Road as one of the top ten literary journals in New England because it "publishes a great mix of high-quality writing while maintaining its cutting-edge voice."

== See also ==
List of literary magazines
