= Deborah Porter =

American writer

Deborah Z. Porter
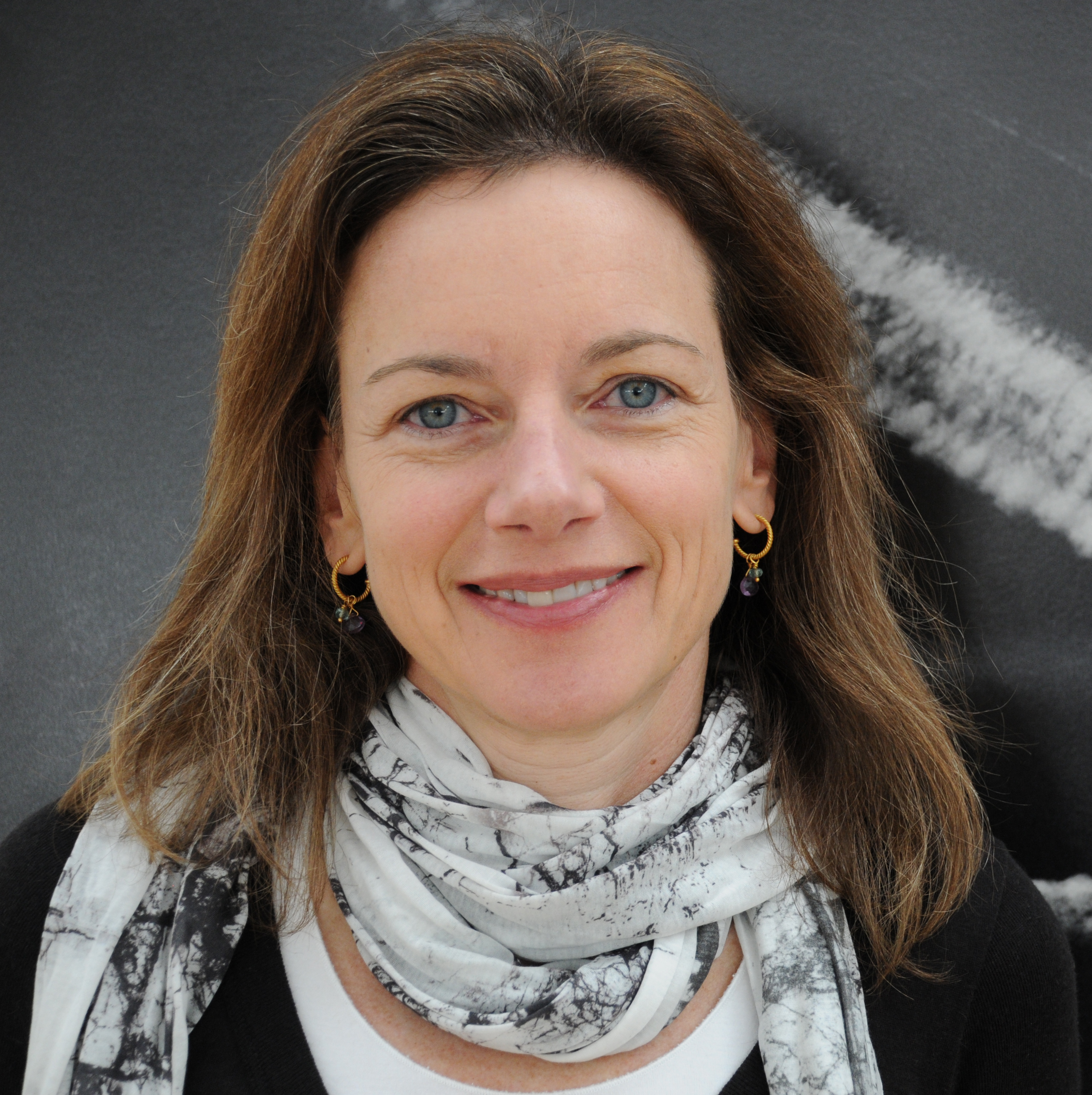
- Born: 1958 (age 67–68); Cleveland, Ohio, US
- Occupations: critic, executive director
- Known for: Boston Book Festival

Deborah Z. Porter (born 1958) is non-profit director best known for founding the Boston Book Festival, which she has run since 2009. She lives in Cambridge, Massachusetts.

== Life and work ==
Porter was born in Cleveland, Ohio. She graduated from Brandeis University in 1980, and founded a non-profit to match students with meaningful internships. Later she pursued her love of books, getting an MA in Children's Literature from Simmons College, and writing as a critic for Kirkus Reviews, Ruminator Review, and WBUR.

== Book festival and reading campaigns ==
In 2006, Porter looked into starting a Boston-area book festival, as none had been held in Boston since the Boston Globe Book Festival had been discontinued. In 2009 she founded a non-profit, the Boston Book Festival, to run such an event each year. The first festival was held that October in Copley Square, drawing over 10,000 attendees and a positive response from the speakers. The festival grew to 25,000 attendees and over 100 presenters each year, including a number of Nobel and Pulitzer Prize–winning authors.

In 2010, Porter started the "One City One Story" project in Boston, to encourage everyone in the city to read the same story and discuss it together. Unlike other citywide reading projects, this project gave away 30,000 copies of the selected story to city residents, organizing large-group discussions involving hundreds of people. This is now an annual event.
