= The Good Men Project =

American blog founded by Tom Matlack

- Formation: June 16, 2009; 17 years ago
- Founder: Tom Matlack
- Type: Online platform
- Purpose: A conversation about the changing roles of men in the 21st century.
- Website: goodmenproject.com

The Good Men Project is an American blog founded by Tom Matlack in 2009.

== Background ==
The online platform was founded in 2009 by American entrepreneur Tom Matlack.

The Good Men Project launched as an online publishing site and social platform on June 1, 2010. It publishes stories surrounding manhood, relationships, sexuality, social justice, and ethics. Ms. magazine once described the site by stating that it "... will make you rethink the idea of a men’s magazine. Recommend it...to anyone who wants to read stories about people coming to terms with what enlightened masculinity might look like in the 21st century.”

On July 9, 2013, an article in The Atlantic Wire argued that The Good Men Project is an alternative to the dying breed of lad mags.

Lisa Hickey is the CEO and publisher of The Good Men Project. Executive editors Wilhelm Cortez, Lisa M. Blacker, and Kara Post-Kennedy are among the site's other employees. Christa McDermott was named the managing editor and partnership director. Michael Kasdan serves a tenure as the director of special projects.

The Good Men Project shares content with The Shriver Report, XOJane and Salon.

=== Books and films ===
The Good Men Project: Real Stories from the Front Lines of Modern Manhood is a collection of 31 essays written by a diverse group of contributors. It includes well-known writers, a former Sing Sing inmate, a father of five watching his wife die from cancer, a soldier returning from Iraq, and a slew of ordinary men willing to share their daily struggles to define themselves as men in the twenty-first century. Notable contributors include rock critic Steve Almond, former New England Patriot Linebacker and NFL Hall of Famer Andre Tippett, and Pulitzer Prize winner Charlie LeDuff.

The film of the same title is directed and produced by Matt Gannon, maker of the feature documentary In the Crease and co-producer of the Oscar-nominated Girl with a Pearl Earring. The film presents the stories of ten men from varied backgrounds who share the moments in their lives that made them who they are.

== Nonprofit foundation ==
The Good Men Foundation was a registered New York State non-profit charitable corporation dedicated to helping organizations that provide educational, social, financial, and legal support to men and boys at risk.

Tom Matlack and his business partner, James Houghton, began The Good Men Foundation with two objectives, help at-risk boys by contributing money to proven non-profits, and to initiate a broad discussion on what it means to be a good man.

=== Good Men Media, Inc. ===
The for-profit arm of the Good Men Project, Good Men Media, Inc., was founded in March 2010 by Lisa Hickey, an advertising veteran and social media consultant. Hickey is also the CEO.

Good Men Media is responsible for publishing the online content site The Good Men Project and is also developing book, film and technological applications that all focus on men's issues.

In November 2010, Good Men Media received a round of angel funding worth $500,000. The company plans to use the funding to expand distribution of men's related content and to support revenue growth. Investors in Good Men Media include project founder Tom Matlack and private angel investors Grant Gund, managing partner of Coppermine Capital; Jack Roberts, CEO and president of Consert Inc.; Mike Jackson, former partner at Lehman Brothers and founding partner of Ironwood and Housatonic Partners; and Michael Margolis, founder of the investment management firm Maric LS, LLC, and others. Ken Goldstein is a member of the board of directors.
