= Vestal McIntyre =

American author

- Born: Nampa, Idaho, U.S.
- Education: Tufts University
- Occupation: Author

Vestal McIntyre is an American author currently based in the UK. He was born in Nampa, Idaho, and educated at Tufts University, Massachusetts. His first collection of short stories, You Are Not the One, was published by the independent Scottish publisher Canongate in 2006. His follow-up book, Lake Overturn, was published in 2009, and won the GrubStreet National Book Prize and the Lambda Literary Award for Gay Fiction.

== Bibliography ==
Title	Publication date
Lake Overturn	2009
You Are Not the One: Stories	2004
Almost Tall	2013
Strangers to Youth: Two Novellas	2014
