= A Young Man's Guide to Late Capitalism =

2011 novel by Peter Mountford

- First edition
- Author: Peter Mountford
- Language: English
- Publisher: Houghton Mifflin Harcourt
- Publication date: 2011
- Dewey Decimal: 813.6
- LC Class: PS3613.O865 Y68

A Young Man's Guide to Late Capitalism is a 2011 novel by Peter Mountford, published by Houghton Mifflin Harcourt.

== Summary ==
In the words of Michael K. Walonen,

Its title playfully aping the Victorian genre of conduct guidebooks for upper class young men, A Young Man's Guide to Late Capitalism recounts the story of Gabriel Francisco de Boya, a former financial reporter newly employed by a rapacious hedge fund and sent to Bolivia to furtively obtain information that will give it a competitive edge in its investment choices. In pursuing this task Gabriel falls in love with Lenka, the press secretary of just-elected President Evo Morales, who unwittingly helps him succeed in his mission by giving him jealousy-fueled false information regarding the nationalization of Bolivia's gas reserves which she thinks will cause his firm to lose money and Gabriel to be guilty of insider trading. The novel ends with Gabriel having been promoted, though alienating both Lenka and his radically leftist anthropology professor mother in the process. He thus achieves the financial security he has sought after but comes to find himself fundamentally alone and prematurely aged.

== Reviews ==
- Yates, Alexander. 'On Peter Mountford's A Young Man's Guide to Late Capitalism.' The Kenyon Review XXXIII.2 (Spring 2011).
