= Lisa Hickey =

Lisa Hickey is an American author and advertising consultant. She has been the CEO of Good Men Media, Inc. and the publisher of Good Men magazine since 2010.

== Biography ==
Hickey received a Bachelor of Arts in Psychology and Sociology from the University of Rochester in 1979 where she graduated cum laude. Hickey went onto acquire a Certificate in Graphic Design from the Massachusetts College of Art in Boston, Massachusetts.

Hickey worked for companies such as Boston's Heater Advertising (Renamed Red), Arnold Worldwide and Holland Mark Advertising. In 1999, she opened her own agency, Velocity Advertising.

Hickey has also helped to resurrect Holland Mark, an agency that she had worked for in the late nineties. In 2007, Hickey was part of a team assembled by Chris Colbert to help re-open the previously troubled company.

In 2009, Hickey teamed up with media critic Steve Hall and Edward Boches to create hashtags about the Super Bowl XLIII ads.

The for-profit arm of the Good Men Project, Good Men Media, Inc., was founded in March 2010 by Hickey who acts as CEO. Hickey was responsible for creating a plan, figuring out an operational structure, and raising investor funding. Good Men Media also published the online magazine The Good Men Project, and books, films and technological applications that all focus on men’s issues.

== Publications ==
- Hickey, Lisa (1999). Design Secrets: Advertising: 50 Real-Life Projects Uncovered. Rockport Publishers. ISBN 978-1564966636.
- Hickey, Lisa (2004). Designs That Stand Up, Speak Out, and Can't Be Ignored. Rockport Publishers. ISBN 1592531040.
- Hickey, Lisa (2007). Little Book of Big Promotions. Quarry Books. ISBN 978-1592533558.

Hickey is also a published poet. Her latest poem, Mail Order Tadpoles, was featured in Rattle, an online poetry magazine.
