= Victoria Thompson =

American author (1948–2024)

- Born: Victoria Ellen Straface; July 25, 1948; Washington, D.C., U.S.
- Died: August 23, 2024 (aged 76); Long Grove, Illinois, U.S.
- Education: University of Maryland (BA); Seton Hall University (MFA)
- Occupation: Author
- Spouse: Jim Thompson (1969)
- Writing career
- Years active: 1985-2024
- Notable awards: Agatha Award; Edgar Allan Poe Award; Career Achievement Award from Romantic Times

Victoria Thompson (born Victoria Ellen Straface, July 25, 1948 – August 23, 2024) was an American author of cozy mystery novels.

== Biography ==
Thompson was born in Washington, D.C., on July 25, 1948. She earned a Bachelor of Arts in English and Secondary Education from the University of Maryland in 1970. She then earned a Master of Fine Arts in Writing Popular Fiction from Seton Hill University in 2012.

Thompson lived with her husband near Chicago. She had two adult daughters who are both writers, and three grandchildren. Thompson died at her home in Long Grove, Illinois, on August 23, 2024, at the age of 76.

== Career ==
Thompson began her career writing historical romance novels in the 1980s. In 1996, her publisher let her go, and her agent encouraged her to try writing mysteries. When Thompson heard Berkley Books was looking for a writer for a series set in turn of the 20th century New York City with a midwife heroine, so she wrote a proposal adding a detective character, and was hired to write the Gaslight Mystery series. Thompson felt it was kismet because she loves history, and she had fallen in love with New York City, and Greenwich Village in particular, when her daughter attended New York University's Tisch School of the Arts. At that time, Thompson was working as a fundraiser for the March of Dimes, and several of the volunteers she worked with were midwives.

Along with writing, Thompson was a professor in the creative writing Master of Fine Arts program at Seton Hill University from 2000-2023. She also served on the Board of Trustees for the Vernon Area Public Library in Lincolnshire, Illinois from 2019-2024. Many of her former students have become published authors, including V.M. Burns. Thompson also taught for a time in the continuing education program at Pennsylvania State University.

== Awards and achievements ==
In 2012, Thompson received a Career Achievement Award from Romantic Times magazine. In 2016, she was Guest of Honor at Malice Domestic mystery fan convention.

Awards for Thompson's writing
Year	Title	Award	Result
1999	Murder on Astor Place	Romantic Times Reviewer’s Choice Awards First Mystery Award	Finalist
2001	Murder on St. Mark’s Place	Edgar Allan Poe Award for Best Paperback Original	Finalist
2005	Murder on Marble Row	Bruce Alexander Historical Mystery Award	Finalist
2012	Murder on Fifth Avenue	Agatha Award for Best Historical Novel	Finalist
2013	Murder in Chelsea	Agatha Award for Best Historical Novel	Finalist
2014	Murder in Murray Hill	Agatha Award for Best Historical Novel	Finalist
2015	Murder on Amsterdam Avenue	Agatha Award for Best Historical Novel	Finalist
2016	Murder in Morningside Heights	Agatha Award for Best Historical Novel	Finalist
2018	Murder on Union Square	Agatha Award for Best Historical Novel	Finalist
2019	City of Secrets	G. P. Putnam's Sons Sue Grafton Memorial Award	Finalist

== Selected publications ==
=== Novels ===
==== Gaslight Mystery Novels ====
- Murder on Astor Place. Berkley Publishing Group. 1999.
- Murder on St. Mark's Place. Berkley Publishing Group. 2000.
- Murder on Gramercy Park. Berkley Publishing Group. 2001.
- Murder on Washington Square. Berkley Publishing Group. 2002.
- Murder on Mulberry Bend. Berkley Publishing Group. 2003.
- Murder on Marble Row. Berkley Publishing Group. 2004.
- Murder on Lenox Hill. Berkley Prime Crime. 2005.
- Murder in Little Italy. Berkley Prime Crime. 2006.
- Murder in Chinatown. Berkley Prime Crime. 2007.
- Murder on Bank Street. Berkley Prime Crime. 2008.
- Murder on Waverly Place. Berkley Prime Crime. 2009.
- Murder on Lexington Avenue. Berkley Prime Crime. 2010.
- Murder on Sisters' Row. Berkley Prime Crime. 2011.
- Murder on Fifth Avenue. Berkley Prime Crime. 2012.
- Murder in Chelsea. Berkley Prime Crime. 2013.
- Murder in Murray Hill. Berkley Prime Crime. 2014.
- Murder on Amsterdam Avenue. Berkley Prime Crime. 2015.
- Murder on St. Nicholas Avenue. Berkley Prime Crime. 2015.
- Murder in Morningside Heights. Berkley Prime Crime. 2016.
- Murder in the Bowery. Berkley Prime Crime. 2017.
- Murder on Union Square. Berkley Prime Crime. 2018.
- Murder on Trinity Place. Berkley Prime Crime. 2019.
- Murder on Pleasant Avenue. Berkley Prime Crime. 2020.
- Murder on Wall Street. Berkley Prime Crime. 2021.
- Murder on Madison Square. Berkley Prime Crime. 2022.
- Murder on Bedford Street. Berkley Prime Crime. 2023.
- Murder in Rose Hill. Berkley Prime Crime. 2024.

==== Counterfeit Lady Novels ====
- City of Lies. Berkley Publishing Group. 2017.
- City of Secrets. Berkley Publishing Group. 2018.
- City of Scoundrels. Berkley Publishing Group. 2019.
- City of Schemes. Berkley Publishing Group. 2020.
- City of Shadows. Berkley Publishing Group. 2021.
- City of Fortune. Berkley Publishing Group. 2022.
- City of Betrayal. Berkley Publishing Group. 2023.

=== Novellas ===
- Greenberg, Martin H.; Lellenberg, John L.; Stashower, Daniel, eds. (2009). "The Minister's Missing Daughter". Sherlock Holmes in America. Skyhorse Publishing.

=== Nonfiction ===
- "Ruining Everything: Tips for Plotting a Mystery". Many Genres, One Craft: Lessons in Writing Popular Fiction. Headline Books. 2011.
