= Noni Carter =

American novelist

Noni Carter is an American author from Fayetteville, Georgia, whose first book, Good Fortune, was released by Simon & Schuster in January 2010. The young-adult novel is about the life of a slave girl who was snatched from her homeland in Africa in the early 19th century and brought to the United States, where she eventually escaped from a plantation and fled to freedom. Carter, who started attending Harvard University as a freshman in the fall of 2009, is one of the youngest writers signed by Simon & Schuster. Noni is currently completing a PhD at Columbia University.

== Literary biography ==
Carter decided to write a novel after sitting around a kitchen table at age 12 with her family listening to a great-aunt tell the story of Rose Caldwell, Carter’s 4xgreat-grandmother. She especially recalls a description of how her Grandma Rose as a young girl watched as her mother was sold across the Mississippi River.

She spent many hours from ages 12 to 15 writing and researching black history for her novel. What began as a short story became the 479-page Good Fortune. She was editing her book by the 11th grade. A writing mentor suggested that Carter start speaking at book festivals. The idea paid off, and her book was picked up by Simon & Schuster at BookExpo America in 2008.

== Good Fortune ==
The protagonist of Good Fortune is Ayanna Bahati, who is captured in Africa at the age of 4 and brought to the American South as a slave. Ayanna eventually escapes slavery and starts a new life in Ohio. Along the way, she learns to read and write and starts a school for black students. Often sad, she hears her past echoing in her name, Bahati, which means “good fortune.”

== Criticism and praise ==
The effect of Carter's book on the current generation has been compared to that of the classic Alex Haley (1921–1992) novel Roots on previous generations. In Roots, Haley traced his ancestry through seven American generations back to Africa.
