= Blair Hurley =

American novelist

- Education: Princeton University (AB); New York University (MFA)
- Occupation: Novelist
- Writing career
- Period: 2009-present
- Website: blairhurley.com

Blair Hurley is an American novelist who lives near Toronto, Ontario. She was awarded a Pushcart Prize in 2018 for her short story The Home for Buddhist Widows, published in West Branch.

In 2018, Hurley published the novel The Devoted. In the New York Times Book Review, critic Sharma Shields called the work an "intimate, fluid debut," and "as tender and fervent as a prayer". Vogue called The Devoted "an assured and promising debut", and Eliana Dockterman at Time Magazine called the work "terrifying but insightful".

== Novels ==
- The Devoted. W. W. Norton. 2018. ISBN 978-0393651591.
- Minor Prophets. Ig Publishing. 2023. ISBN 978-1632461490.
