= Meredith Goldstein =

American journalist

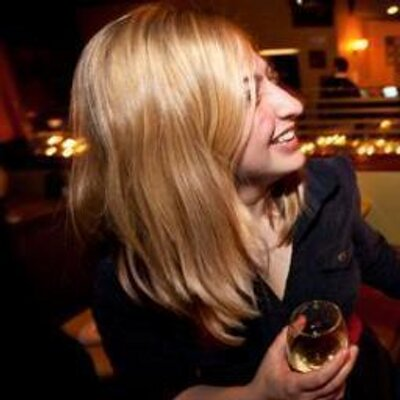
Meredith Goldstein at Love Letters party in Somerville, MA.

Meredith Goldstein is an advice columnist and entertainment reporter for The Boston Globe. Her love advice column "Love Letters" appears daily on Boston.com and in the Globe’s print edition every Tuesday, Friday, Saturday, and in the Sunday Magazine.

Goldstein's first novel, The Singles, was released by Penguin/Plume on April 24, 2012. The novel was optioned for film by Lime Orchard Productions, which is run by Stacey Lubliner and actress Jami Gertz.

In March 2016, Grand Central Publishing acquired a memoir based on Goldstein's Love Letters column. "Can't Help Myself: Lessons and Confessions From a Modern Advice Columnist" was released April 3, 2018. The book was reviewed in 2018 by both Publishers Weekly and Kirkus.

Goldstein's first young adult novel, Chemistry Lessons, was released June 19, 2018 with Houghton Mifflin Harcourt.

Goldstein was born in New Jersey, raised in Highland, Maryland, went to Syracuse University, and now lives in Jamaica Plain, Massachusetts.
