= Elizabeth Benedict =

American author

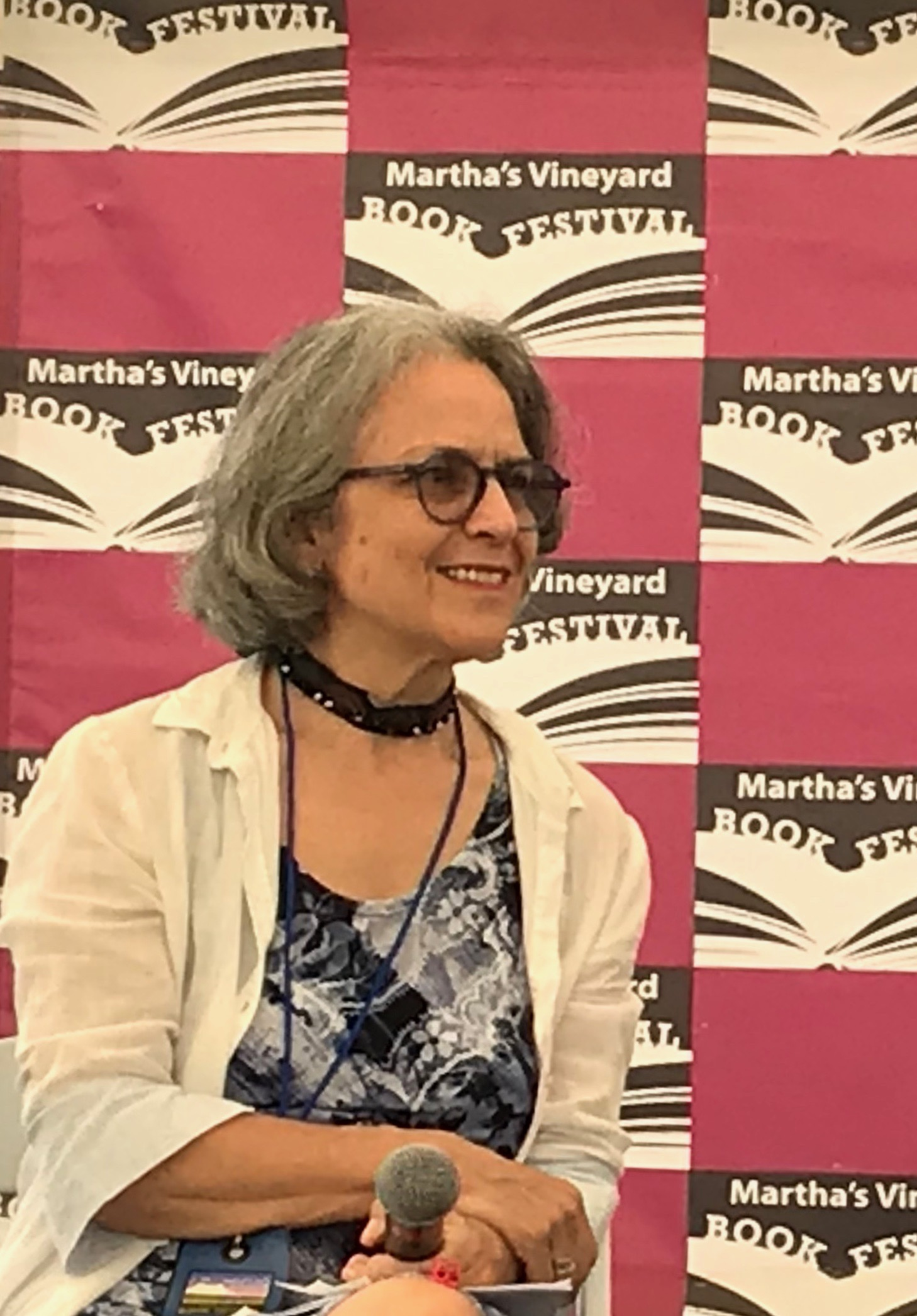
- Benedict at the Martha's Vineyard Book Festival, 2019
- Education: Barnard College
- Occupations: Writer; Editor; College Admissions Consultant
- Website: elizabethbenedict.com

Elizabeth Benedict is an American author best known for her fiction, her personal essays, as the editor of three anthologies, and for The Joy of Writing Sex: A Guide for Fiction Writers. Her novels are: Slow Dancing, The Beginner's Book of Dreams, Safe Conduct, Almost, and The Practice of Deceit. Her first memoir, Rewriting Illness: A View of My Own, was published in May 2023. She lives in New York City and works as a college admissions consultant.

== Work ==
=== Fiction ===
Her first published short story, "Feasting," was selected for the 1983 O. Henry Prize Short Story collection. Her second story, "A Fifty Percent Chance," published in Seventeen magazine in 1982, earned a National Magazine Award. Benedict's first novel, Slow Dancing (Alfred A. Knopf), was a finalist for the 1985 National Book Award and the Los Angeles Times Fiction Prize. Additionally, her novel Almost, a New York Times Notable Book of the Year, was selected as one of Newsweek's Best Fiction of 2001.

=== Nonfiction ===
Benedict's Joy of Writing Sex: A Guide for Fiction Writers (Story Press) was first published in 1996. A second edition, published in 2002, was updated to include the new role of the Internet and the Bill Clinton-Monica Lewinsky scandal in writing about sex in fiction. The book was also published in the U.K., Germany, and Australia.

Benedict teaches workshops on writing about sex in fiction at writers' conferences and has appeared on radio shows discussing the issue in the U.S., UK, and Australia.

The Joy of Writing Sex led The New York Observer to include Benedict on its panel on the Clinton-Lewinsky scandal, described in Francine Prose's article, "New York Supergals Love That Naughty Prez" Benedict defended then-President Clinton's conduct, saying "Nobody is aggrieved here. Monica's not complaining, Hillary's not complaining. The only person who cares is Ken Starr." Benedict reaffirmed her defense of Clinton in a retrospective of the scandal on the Slate podcast "Slow Burn", in 2018.

Benedict's first memoir, Rewriting Illness: A View of My Own, an account of her experience with lymphoma, was published in May 2023.

In 2024, Benedict published an essay in Salmagundi about her personal correspondence with American writer James Salter, in which Salter discussed his complex feelings about his Jewish identity and decision to change his name from James Horowitz to James Salter. Salter had previously refused to discuss these matters publicly.

Benedict's book reviews, personal essays, and articles have appeared in The New York Times, Los Angeles Times, The Boston Globe, Salmagundi, Tin House, Daedalus, Harper's Bazaar, Esquire, Real Simple, Allure, The American Prospect, and The Rumpus. Her short fiction and memoir have appeared in Narrative Magazine.

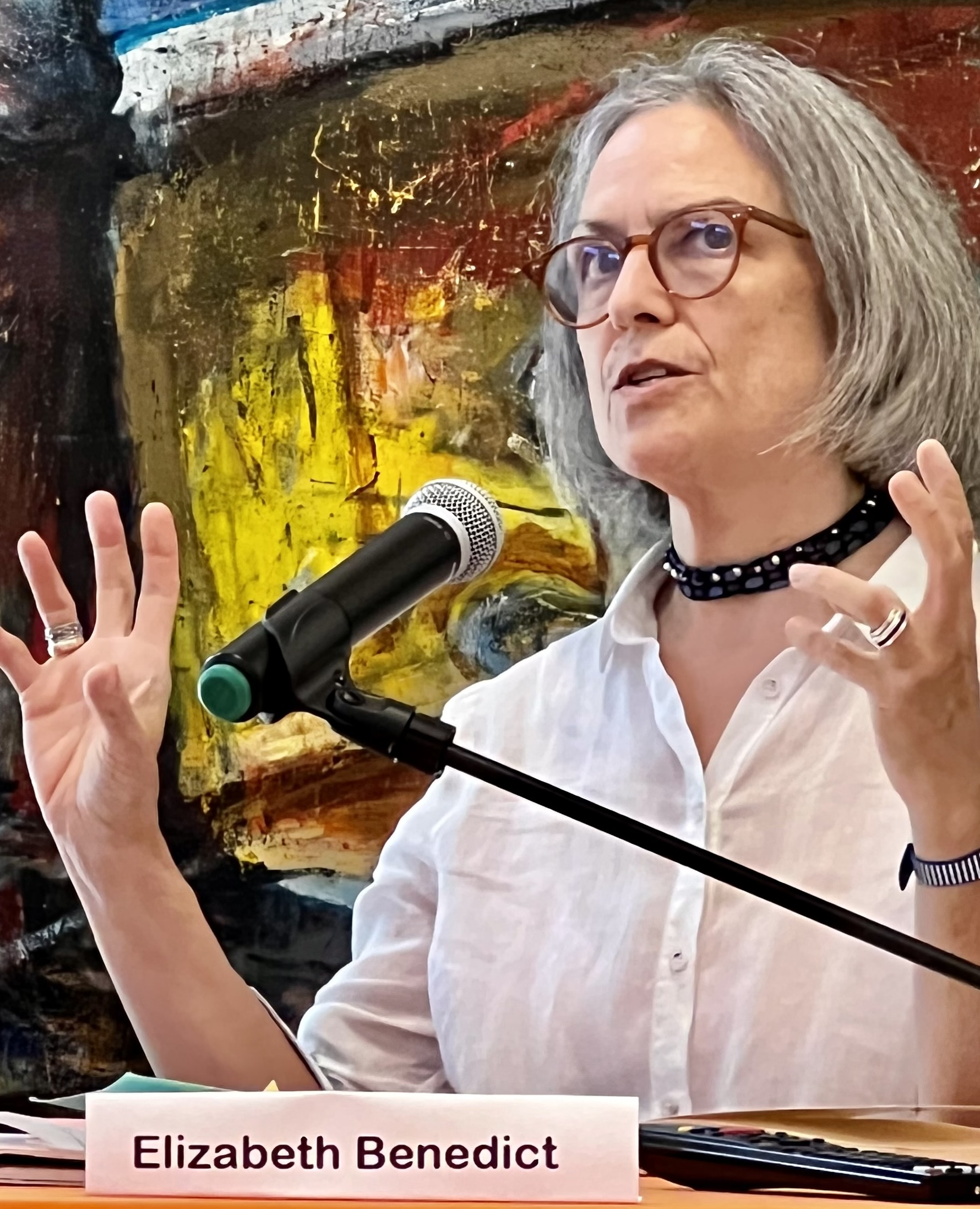
Elizabeth Benedict speaking at Islanders Write in Martha's Vineyard, July 2022

=== Anthologies ===
Benedict is the editor of three anthologies. The first, Mentors, Muses and Monsters: 30 Writers on the People who Changed Their Lives (2009, Free Press, Simon & Schuster), was inspired by an essay she wrote for Tin House about her mentor at Barnard, Elizabeth Hardwick. It includes essays by other Barnard alumnae Mary Gordon and Sigrid Nunez. Nunez's essay on Susan Sontag was the inspiration for her 2011 memoir about Sontag, Sempre Susan.

Her second anthology, What My Mother Gave Me: Thirty-one Women on the Gifts that Mattered Most (2013 Algonquin Books), was a New York Times Bestseller. Her third, Me, My Hair and I: Twenty-seven Women Untangle an Obsession (2015, Algonquin Books) includes essays by Maria Hinojosa, Marita Golden, and Jane Smiley.

== Themes ==
Growing up in New York City has been a noted theme of Benedict's fiction and nonfiction. About her second novel, The Beginner's Book of Dreams, Kirkus Reviews wrote: "Benedict handles Manhattan life, in this case a young girl's exploration of semi-fraudulent Manhattan life, superbly—with the vibrancy of The World of Henry Orient (that underappreciated book by Nora Johnson) or with the emotional dislocations of the better work of John O'Hara and Richard Yates."

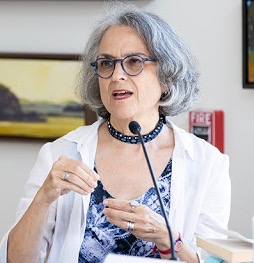
Benedict at the 2019 Islander's Write Festival in Martha's Vineyard

Benedict's personal essay, "Murder One: Mad Dog Taborsky and Me" was published in Daedalus in 2008 and explored the effect of the murder of her mother's brother on her parents' marriage and her own life. In 1960, Joseph "Mad Dog" Taborsky was the last man executed in the state of Connecticut until 2005, after being released from death row for the murder of Benedict's uncle. Once released, he committed a series of murders that terrorized central Connecticut in 1956 and 1957.

== College essay coaching and teaching ==
Benedict is the founder and president of Don't Sweat the Essay, Inc., which focuses on coaching students for college and graduate school application essays. She has written frequently on the subject for Huffington Post.

Benedict has been on the fiction faculty of the New York State Summer Writers Institute, at Skidmore College, since 1997

== Bibliography ==
- Slow Dancing (1985)
- The Beginner's Book of Dreams (1988)
- Safe Conduct (1993)
- The Joy of Writing Sex (1996, revised 2002)
- Almost (2001)
- The Practice of Deceit (2005)
- Rewriting Illness: A View of My Own (2023)
- Mentors, Muses and Monsters: 30 Writers on the People Who Changed Their Lives (Editor) (2009)
- What My Mother Gave Me: Thirty-one Writers on the Gifts that Mattered Most (Editor) (2013)
- Me, My Hair and I: Twenty-seven Women Untangle an Obsession (Editor) (2015)
