= Mark W. Moffett =

American entomologist

Mark Moffett (born 7 January 1958) is an American tropical biologist who studies the ecology of tropical forest canopies and the social behavior of animals (especially ants) and humans. He is also the author of several popular science books and is noted for his macrophotography documenting ant biology.

== Early life and education ==
Moffett was born in Salida, Colorado, where his father was a Presbyterian minister. As a young boy, he was interested in insects and when the family moved to Wisconsin, he attended meetings of the Wisconsin Herpetological Society, where, at 12, he was the youngest member. Although a high-school drop out he was admitted to Beloit College, and at 17 he was invited to a collecting trip to Costa Rica. He came across the book The Insect Societies and wrote to the author E.O. Wilson before he met him and went on to research under him. Moffett received his Ph.D. in Organismic and Evolutionary Biology from Harvard University in 1989 under Wilson. Moffett is a Research Associate in the Department of Entomology at the National Museum of Natural History in the Smithsonian Institution.

== Awards, exhibits and media ==
Moffett is a past Yale University Poynter Fellow in journalism, received a Bowdoin Prize from Harvard University, the Lowell Thomas Medal from The Explorers Club in 2006, a National Outdoor Book Award in 2010, a PROSE (Professional and Scholarly Excellence) Award from the Association of American Publishers in 2010, and awards for his photography from World Press Photo Foundation and Pictures of the Year International.

In 2009, the exhibition Farmers Warriors, Builders: the Hidden Life on Ants opened at the National Museum of Natural History in the Smithsonian Institution, containing 40 of Moffett’s images. Moffett is a lecturer for the National Geographic Society and was a speaker for the World Science Festival in 2013. Moffett has appeared multiple times on the Late Night with Conan O'Brien and The Colbert Report. He has also been interviewed in such radio programs as National Geographic’s Weekend Edition, "Fresh Air" and other NPR programs, West Coast Live!, Voice of America, CBS Sunday Morning, and Living on Earth.

The ant species Pheidole moffetti from French Guiana was named after him by Edward O. Wilson in 2003.

== Publications ==
- Moffett, Mark W (1994). The High Frontier: Exploring the Tropical Rainforest Canopy. Harvard University Press. ISBN 9780674390386.
- Moffett, Mark W (2008). Face to Face with Frogs. National Geographic Society. ISBN 978-1426302053.
- Moffett, Mark W (2010). Adventures Among Ants. University of California Press. ISBN 978-0520261990.
- Moffett, Mark W (2019). The human swarm: how our societies arise, thrive, and fall. Basic Books. ISBN 9780465055685. OCLC 1080600557.
