= Peter Mountford (author) =

American author

Peter Mountford (born July 17, 1976) is an American novelist and writer of short stories and non-fiction.

== Biography ==
A former adjunct scholar of the Alexis de Tocqueville Institution, Mountford received an MFA in fiction in 2006 from the University of Washington, where he won the David Guterson Prize for a thesis. He was a 2012–14 writer-in-residence for the Richard Hugo House.

== Published work ==
Mountford's first novel, A Young Man's Guide to Late Capitalism, was published by Houghton Mifflin Harcourt in April 2011. The novel won the 2012 Washington State Book Award in fiction and was a finalist for the 2012 VCU Cabell First Novelist Award. Set in Bolivia and inspired by the author's experiences in Ecuador working at the Tocqueville Institution, it describes the interplay and conflict between the interests of Bolivia and the goals of international financiers. The author discovered that the book was being translated into Russian for a pirate publisher.

His second novel, The Dismal Science, was released in February 2014 by Tin House Books.

Mountford's short fiction and essays have appeared in The Atlantic, Boston Review, Best New American Voices 2008, Granta, Michigan Quarterly Review, Salon, Seattle Review, and Conjunctions.

== Works ==
=== Novels ===
- A Young Man's Guide to Late Capitalism (Houghton Mifflin Harcourt, 2011)
- The Dismal Science (Tin House, 2014)

=== Short fiction ===
- Impact Play, Kink - Stories (Simon & Schuster, 2021)
- Two Sisters, in the Fall 2010 issue of Phoebe: A Journal of Literature and Art
- Mr. McNamara's Suit, in the Spring 2010 issue of Seattle Review
- A Room on the Eighth Floor, Conjunctions, Fall 2008
- Horizon, Best New American Voices 2008 and Michigan Quarterly Review.
- Barbarians' Fantasies, Boston Review, March/April 2007
