= Mandy Keifetz =

American novelist, playwright, and poet (born 1966)

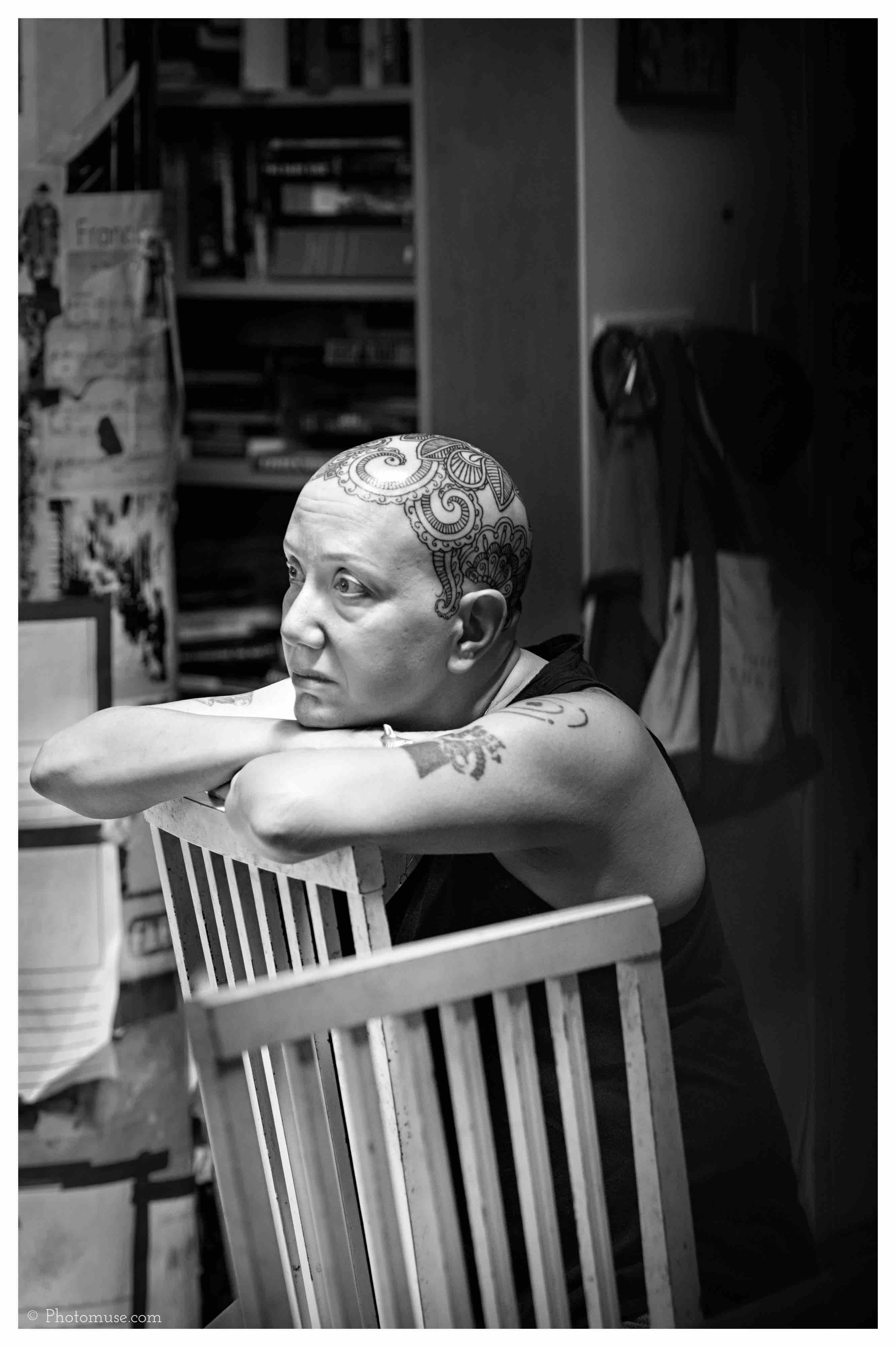
- Keifetz in 2016
- Born: May 26, 1966 (age 60)
- Occupations: Novelist; playwright; poet

Mandy Keifetz (born May 26, 1966) is an American novelist, playwright, and poet. Her work has appeared in The Massachusetts Review, The Brooklyn Rail, .Cent, Penthouse, Vogue, QW, The Review of Contemporary Fiction, and others. She was a Fellow with the New York Foundation for the Arts in 2002 and her plays have been staged in London at the Young Vic and Theatre503, in Cambridge at the Junction Theater and at the Judith E. Wilson Studio, in Montréal at the Théâtre Ste. Catherine, in Oslo at the Samtid Festivalen and in New York at Where Eagles Dare Studios.

== Works ==
- Flea Circus: A Brief Bestiary of Grief, 2012. New Issues Poetry & Prose
  - Association of Writers and Writing Programs Prize in the Novel (AWP Prize), 2010
  - Grub Street Prize finalist and honorable mention, 2011
  - "A tour de force." Kirkus Reviews
  - "A lovely mix of lyrical imagery and striking prose" Superstition Review, Issue 9
  - "Artful alliteration and sorrowful lyricism" TriQuarterly
- Corrido, 1998. Flea Bites Press
  - "What makes the novel a satisfying read is Keifetz's right-on grasp of events and details that elevate the common into something nearly precious." The Austin Chronicle
- Her forthcoming third novel Klingon Confidential was excerpted in The Massachusetts Review (Winter 2012, Vol. 53 Issue 4)
