= Nuvein Magazine =

Nuvein Magazine logo

Nuvein Magazine was an online magazine about fiction, poetry, and essays in existence from 1996 to 2004. It was started by Enrique D. Diaz while on board the U.S.S. New Jersey (BB-62) in 1982. The publication was a collection of photocopied articles and short stories written by Enrique and fellow sailors.

== History and profile ==
In 1996, Nuvein Magazine made its debut on the web. The magazine was originally published in photocopy format and distributed individually. This was the case up to issue 22, published for Fall 2004 when the editorial board behind the magazine ceased operations. In its time, Nuvein Magazine was available online and was also printed in anthology format; it was one of the older online magazines in continuous existence. The writers included in the magazine came from different parts of the world. They are representative of both genders, and also of cultural and ethnic diversity. Nuvein Magazine also includes voices from the community, ranging from entertainment to educational intent.

The magazine was well received, and its publisher, Enrique Diaz, was encouraged to organize a non-profit arts organization, a foundation (Nuvein Foundation for Literature and the Arts) in order to expose young people to literature and the arts in the San Gabriel Valley Region and communities of Southern California. In 2007, Nuvein became a 501(c)(3) nonprofit organization, with the help of the community and business leaders from various San Gabriel Valley cities, and established its home in El Monte, California.

Seal of the Nuvein Foundation

The flagship of this endeavor was the Nuvein Presents series where performers (poets, writers, musicians, comedians, dancers, and others) perform for the community to contribute to their cultural and artistic aims. The Nuvein Foundation also began to raise funds in order to provide scholarships to students interested in a career in literature and the arts, which it continues to do to this day. Nuvein continues to offer various community events and programs for the communities across the San Gabriel Valley.

The El Monte/South El Monte Chamber of Commerce Educational Committee joined Nuvein Foundation as co-sponsors of Nuvein Presents. Nuvein Magazine's publisher was Enrique D. Diaz. The editor was Anh Lottman. The Nuvein Foundation board of directors originally included the following: Jeffrey Bickel, UCLA Film and Television Archive; Juan Nunez, Valley Vista Services; Roberta Lujan, Golfland South El Monte; Miguel Sankitts, Mavrec Global; Renato Aguirre, IDM; Ryan Storms, Sk8Life Clothing; Jody Bush, El Monte/South El Monte Chamber of Commerce, Enrique D. Diaz, and Anh Lottman.
