= Joanna Schaffhausen =

American mystery novelist

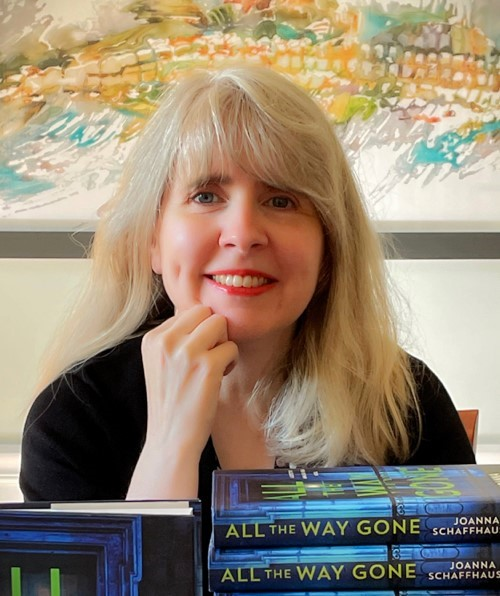
- Schaffhausen with All the Way Gone in 2024
- Education: Tufts University (BA); Yale University (PhD)
- Occupations: Novelist; science journalist (formerly)
- Spouse: Garrett Rooney (m. 2008)
- Children: 1
- Writing career
- Genres: Mystery; police procedural; thriller
- Notable awards: Mystery Writers of America/Minotaur Books First Crime Novel Award
- Website: joannaschaffhausen.com

Joanna Schaffhausen is an American mystery novelist and former science journalist. She has authored nine novels in two series about female protagonists, with thriller and police procedural elements, that have been translated to four languages. Before writing full time, she worked as a science advisor for ABC News television and edited a pharmacological journal.

== Education and journalism career ==
Joanna Schaffhausen graduated from Tufts University in 1996, majoring in psychology, specifically neuroscience. She says she tried nearly every Tufts department before deciding to major in neuroscience when she realized that it was the brain studying about itself. She received a PhD in behavioral neuroscience from Yale University in 2003, studying learning in memory under Thomas J. Carew.

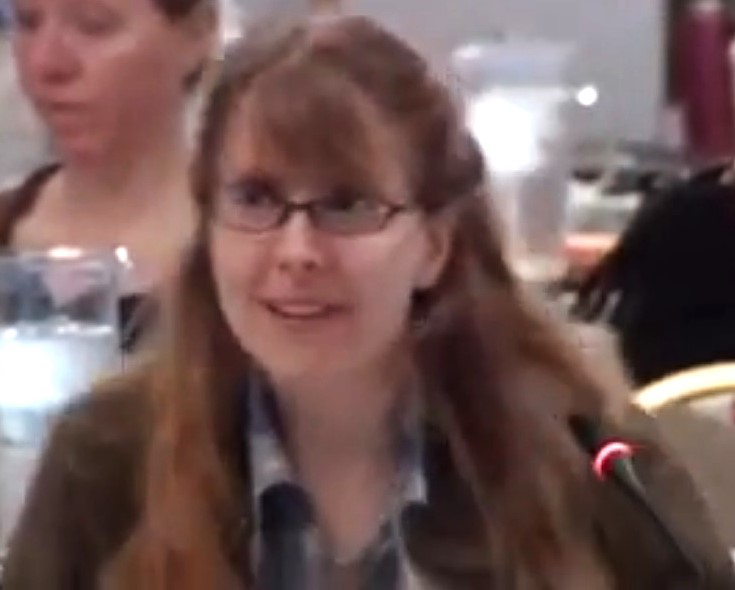
Schaffhausen reporting for ABC News from a National Human Genome Research Institute seminar in 2010

After graduating, Schaffhausen worked as an editorial producer for ABC News television, doing science advising for programs such as ABC World News, Good Morning America and 20/20. In 2010, she joined the science publisher Cell Press as an editor at Trends in Pharmacological Sciences. She left Cell Press in 2018 to write full time.

== Mystery writing ==
=== Ellery Hathaway series ===
Schaffhausen's first published mystery novel was The Vanishing Season, published in December 2017 by the Minotaur imprint of St. Martin's Press (ISBN 978-1-250-12604-7). It introduced Ellery "Ellie" Hathaway, junior police officer in the fictional town of Woodbury, Massachusetts. As a child, she was the sole survivor of a serial killer, and changed her name to escape the publicity. When she suspects another serial killer is stalking both her small town, and her personally, Ellery calls Reed Markham, the disgraced FBI criminal profiler who rescued her fourteen years ago.

The Vanishing Season won the 2016 Minotaur Books/Mystery Writers of America First Crime Novel Award. It was translated to Czech as Noc, kdy zmizela Bea Nesbitová (literally The night Bea Nesbit died) in September 2018 (Metafora, ISBN 978-80-7359-572-2), and to German as Wie viele willst du töten (literally How many do you want to kill) in March 2020 (dtv Verlagsgesellschaft, ISBN 9783423219204).

Her second book, No Mercy, published in January 2019 (Minotaur, ISBN 978-1-250-29736-5), follows Ellery, on involuntary leave and attending group therapy classes after shooting the killer from the first book. She becomes interested in the stories of two members, a rape victim, and a mother who lost her son to an arsonist. Since she can't investigate officially, she calls her friend Reed Markham. The book was translated to Czech as Bez smilování later in 2019 (Metafora, ISBN 978-80-271-2277-6), and to Hungarian as Nincs kegyelem in July 2023 (Holnap Kiadó, ISBN 9789633494110).

All the Best Lies, published in February 2020 (ISBN 978-1-250-29738-9), describes Reed Markham and Ellery Hathaway investigating the murder of Reed's mother, in Las Vegas, forty years ago. Reed was adopted after her death, but DNA tests reveal that his adopting father was actually his biological father. It was translated to Czech as Jedna velká lež in July 2020 (Metafora, ISBN 978-80-7625-087-1), and to German as All die dunklen Lügen in February 2021 (dtv Verlagsgesellschaft, ISBN 9783423218405).

Every Waking Hour (January 2021, ISBN 978-1-250-24965-4) has Ellery and Reed trying to find a girl who disappeared from a Boston street fair. The novel also follows the fragile relationship between the two, who became a romantic couple in the previous book.

Last Seen Alive (January 2022, ISBN 978-1-250-24967-8) sees the return of Francis Coben, the serial murderer and kidnapper that originally brought Ellery and Reed together. Coben, in prison, offers to reveal the graves of his previous victims if he can meet Ellie again. The novel concludes with a coda for the series, Ellery's and Reed's relationship, and their plans for the rest of their lives.

=== Annalisa Vega series ===
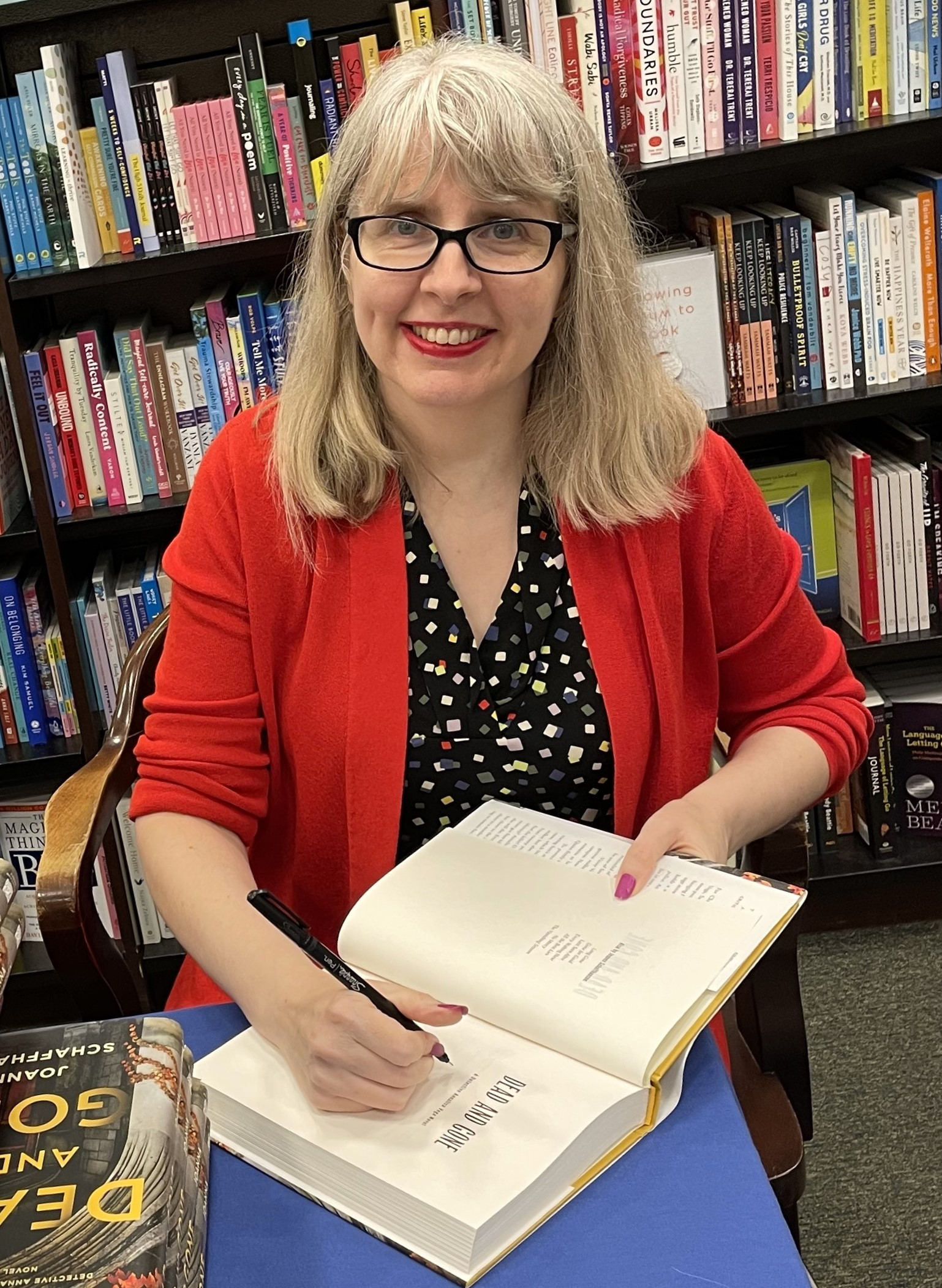
Schaffhausen signing copies of Dead and Gone in 2023

Gone for Good, Schaffhausen's fifth novel, (August 2021, ISBN 978-1-250-26460-2) marked the start of a new novel series, about Detective Annalisa Vega of the Chicago Police Department. In it, a serial killer has apparently returned after twenty years, the victim being a member of a group of cold case amateur sleuths, and a childhood friend of Vega's mother. It was published in Estonian as Jäädavalt lahkunud in 2024 (Suur Puu, ISBN 9789916928134).

Long Gone (August 2022, ISBN 978-1-250-26463-3) sees Vega and her partner and ex-husband Nick Carelli investigate the murder of a legendary Chicago police officer, and his wife telling a fantastic story of an intruder in wetsuit and diving mask. The complex investigation sees Vega framed for murder by the victim's former partners.

Dead and Gone (August 2023, ISBN 9781250853370) has Vega investigating the death of a private investigator and former police officer, her boss's old friend. Before Sam Tran was found hanging from a tree, he was investigating three complex cases, including a stalker of Vega's niece.

All the Way Gone (August 2024, ISBN 9781250904140) sees Vega having left the Chicago Police Department to open her own detective agency. Vega follows two cases at once, an author wondering whether the doctor subject of her book, The Good Sociopath, is actually a murderer, and finding the mother of Vega's stepdaughter's girlfriend, who needs a kidney transplant. All the Way Gone was nominated for the 2025 G. P. Putnam's Sons Sue Grafton Memorial Award.

=== Mystery writing support ===
Besides novels, Schaffhausen writes articles about mystery writing, true crime, especially murders, and reviews mystery novels by other authors.

Schaffhausen has served on the board of the New England chapter of Mystery Writers of America from 2020, as its vice president from 2021 to 2024, and as its current president, from 2025.

== Personal life ==
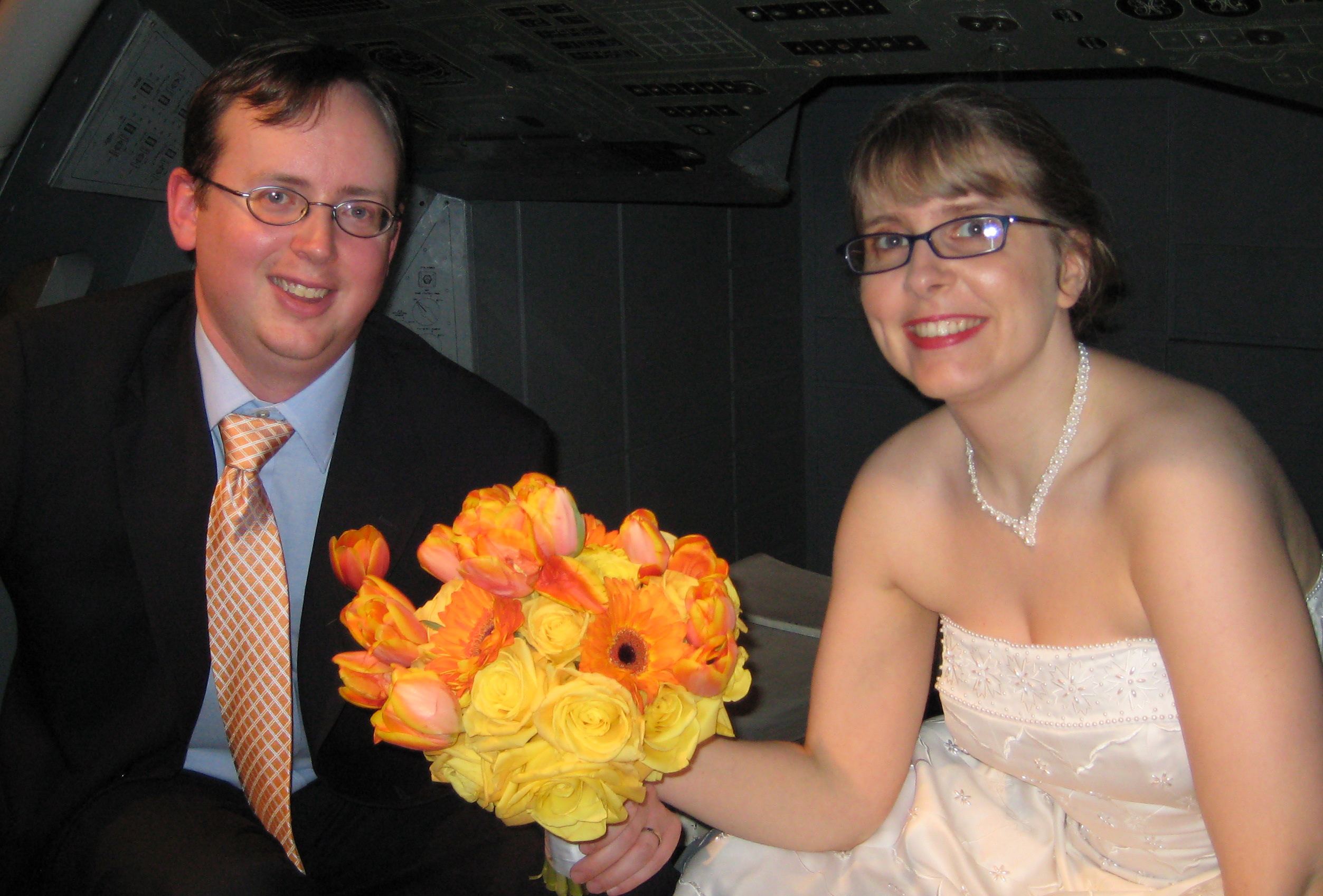
Schaffhausen (right) with husband Garrett Rooney, inside the model of a Apollo command module at the Boston Museum of Science at their wedding reception, 2008

Schaffhausen lives in Canton, Massachusetts with her husband, their daughter, and a Basset Hound she used as a model for Ellery Hathaway's dog Bump. Her husband, Garrett Rooney, is a software engineer and was a published author before she was (his book, Practical Subversion, was published by Apress in 2005, ISBN 1590592905).
