= Tom Matlack =

American venture capitalist and author

- Born: Circa. July 1965 (age 61); United States
- Education: Wesleyan University; Yale School of Management
- Occupations: Venture capitalist, entrepreneur
- Known for: Founder and managing partner of Megunticook Management
- Spouse: Elena (second wife)
- Children: 3

Tom Matlack is an American entrepreneur, venture capitalist, and author. In 2009, Matlack founded The Good Men Project.

== Early years and education ==
Matlack graduated from Wesleyan University in 1986 with a B.A. and an M.B.A. from Yale School of Management in 1991.

== Career ==
He served as the chief financial officer of The Providence Journal until 1997 when the paper was absorbed in a $1.5 billion takeover by the A. H. Belo Corporation of Dallas, owner of The Dallas Morning News and a number of television stations. The deal was orchestrated by Matlack.

Matlack has led several venture investments in the technology arena, such as Art Technology Group, where he invested at a $7.5 million pre-money valuation and exited most of his investors at a $5 billion valuation. In 2010, Art Technology Group was purchased by Oracle for 1 billion.

From 1999 until 2010, Matlack founded and ran as a managing partner Megunticook Management, a venture capital firm that started more than 30 companies. Megunticook's biggest success was a company called Telephia in which the company was a lead investor. In 2007, Telephia was sold to Neilsen for over $500 million.

Beyond his work with The Good Men Project, Matlack is an active investor. He also founded Game Empire Enterprises.

=== Media appearances and interviews ===
In October 2009, Matlack started the Good Men Book tour at Sing Sing prison. According to Matlack, "My book is about manhood and redemption. I have in my mind the image of Johnny Cash going into Fulsom Prison. Like his music, my book is about manhood, raw and unvarnished. So I need to find guys who understand what that is about. It's also about the possibility of redemption, about making mistakes, and about picking yourself up. I have no idea what I am going to say to these guys but I am going to try."

In December 2009, Matlack appeared on the Tyra Banks Show where he donated, on behalf of the Good Men Foundation, $5,000 to help cover Christmas expenses for a family who had just lost their husband and father.

Matlack has interviewed David Kohan, creator of Will & Grace and artist Shep Fairey.

He has also been interviewed by his own foundation where he discusses his reason for starting the Good Men Foundation.

== Publications ==
Matlack's work has appeared in Rowing News, Boston Common, Boston Magazine, Boston Globe Magazine and Newspaper, Wesleyan, Yale, Tango, and PopMatters. He is a regular columnist for The Huffington Post.

Matlack has a regular column titled “Good is Good” as part of The Good Men Magazine, a blog titled “The Good Man” for Men's Health, and regularly publishes pieces on his Scribd page.

Matlack has had op-ed pieces published in the Boston Globe as well as regular feature articles. He has also contributed multiple pieces to Boston Magazine.

Once an avid rower at Wesleyan, he has also had pieces featured in Rowing News. His connection to Wesleyan also allowed him to interview Mad Men creator Matthew Weiner for the Wesleyan Magazine.

== The Good Men Foundation ==
The Good Men Foundation is a nonprofit charitable corporation based in the state of New York. It is dedicated to helping organizations that provide educational, social, financial, and legal support to men and boys at risk.

Tom Matlack and his business counterpart, James Houghton, created The Good Men Foundation to drive discussion about cultural issues pertaining to men.

Matlack left the Good Men Project on April 9, 2013, two days after publishing an article critical of an editorial by Catherine Rampell in The New York Times published on April 2. During that same week, he also deleted his Twitter account.

In 2019, the foundation released documentary film, "The Good Men Project: Real Stories From the Front Lines of Modern Manhood". The film was directed and produced by Matthew Gannon and features Kent George, John Sheehy, Bruce Ellman, Mark St.Amant, Konstantin Selivan, Amin Ahmad, Charlie LeDuff, Stuart Horwitz, Michael Kamber and Rolf Gates.
