= A Council of Dolls =

2023 novel by Mona Susan Power

- First edition cover
- Author: Mona Susan Power
- Cover artist: Holly Young (art); Mumtaz Mustafa (design)
- Language: English
- Genre: Indigenous; Literary; Cultural Heritage; Magical Realism; Historical / 20th Century / General; Coming of Age; Own Voices; Saga
- Set in: 19th century America; 20th century America; Standing Rock Indian Reservation; Carlisle Indian Industrial School
- Publisher: Mariner Books imprint of HarperCollins
- Publication date: August 8, 2023
- Publication place: United States
- Media type: Print
- Pages: 308
- Awards: Minnesota Book Awards; High Plains Book Awards
- ISBN: 9780063281097 hardcover
- OCLC: 1340038999
- Dewey Decimal: 813.6
- LC Class: PS3566.083578 C68 2023
- Website: www.monasusanpower.com/a-council-of-dolls

A Council of Dolls is a 2023 historical fiction family saga novel by Mona Susan Power (Standing Rock Sioux). The story follows multiple generations of Yanktonai Dakota women grappling with the effects of settler colonialism, told partially through the point of view of their dolls. The book was released through Mariner Books in August 2023. A Council of Dolls was longlisted for the 2023 National Book Award for Fiction.

== Plot summary ==
Three generations of Dakota girls and their dolls live through family and societal change. The girls and dolls can talk to each other, and the dolls have powers to help the girls through the tragedies they face. The narrative is non-linear.

== Concept and creation ==
A Council of Dolls was published nearly thirty years after the success of Mona Susan Power's debut novel The Grass Dancer. Power struggled with mental health and her writing practice following her debut.

The novel is an expansion on an earlier story about dolls written in fall of 2019 and published by The Missouri Review in 2021 called "Naming Ceremony" (OCLC 9014326414). "Naming Ceremony" was runner-up for the 2020 Jeffrey E. Smith Editors’ Prize and a finalist for the 2019 Rick DeMarinis Short Story Prize.

Power was guided by her family's own history with unwelcome government intervention into Native society and multigenerational experiences with Indian boarding schools. While writing another novel in 2014 with the working title "Harvard Indian Seance at Lizzie Borden Bed and Breakfast", Power felt compelled to tell the story of boarding school survivors. Weeks later, international news broke about child burials at Canadian boarding schools, which she says explained her need to tell boarding school stories. Power wrote about several generations of the family because she wanted readers to sympathize with the effects of their intergenerational trauma, rather than condemn them. For Writer's Digest she explained: "My concern that the mother character will be judged and disliked for her woundedness, the dangers it creates, leads me to include two more generations of girls and their stories. As I write, I feel ancestors crowding into the small room. This is their story, too. I believe they support my efforts, cheer me on, as if my healing the past will help them set down their own sadness and regret." At times writing the novel was so emotional she would cry. "A Council of Dolls is my attempt to be part of a long overdue, ferociously suppressed healing ceremony."

The book dedication reads "For my ancestors". "This novel’s dedication, [...] affirms its roots in Power’s family history," according to the High Plains Book Awards review. The story is semi-autobiographical, with the characters and story based on herself, her own family members, and their family history. The character of Lillian is based on her mother, activist Susan Kelly Power, one of the founders of the American Indian Center in Chicago, Illinois.

The novel was written during the COVID-19 pandemic lockdown beginning in February 2021. The first draft was completed in four months following recovery from a broken arm in May 2021. Power was completing copy-edits in 2022.

== Release ==
Power held a launch party on publication day 8 August 2023 at the Birchbark Books event space Birchbark Bizhew in Minneapolis, Minnesota. The first printing was 75,000 books. A paperback version was released November 5, 2024.

The cover art is by Dakota beadwork artist Holly Young (Standing Rock Sioux), who connected with Power while researching prominent historical beadworker Nellie Two Bears Gates (Standing Rock Sioux), who is Power's great-grandmother. Publisher Harper Collins chose an existing piece for A Council of Dolls: floral appliqué beadwork sewn onto blue velvet cloth in traditional Dakota style. Young also created a custom work for the cover of Diane Wilson's The Seed Keeper, and the newest edition of The Grass Dancer.

== Reception ==
A starred review by Publishers Weekly calls it a "story of survival that shines brightly," and says Power reveals a "deep knowledge of Indigenous history" and the book is a "keen" and "wrenching" depiction of boarding schools. Booklist describes the novel as a "heart-wrenching account of inherited trauma and resilience" that "is perceptively told." Midwest Book Review "unreservedly recommend[s]" the book as a "masterpiece of literary elegance and emotional eloquence". In reviews published for the finalists for their awards, the High Plains Book Awards reviewer calls the dolls an "ingenious technique" and the writing "glorious prose". They recommend it "for readers who appreciate great writing, great storytelling, universal themes, and the history of a people who have emerged with a strong, proud identity after centuries of oppression." In literary magazine F(r)iction, Sara Santistevan praised the novel's use of speculative fiction elements: "The speculative elements in A Council of Dolls are executed so seamlessly into the narrative I found myself questioning whether they even were speculative."

The Historical Novels Review said the book is a "beautifully written story" that is "highly recommended", but found the final portion "a bit disconnected" from the rest of the book. Kirkus Reviews had a mixed response to the book, saying it was "occasionally moving" but "steeped a little bit too long in sentimentality."

Writing for American Literary History, James H Cox lists A Council of Dolls as a "powerful example" of "centering of the tribal national", defined as specific depictions of tribal identity and politics despite displacement. Cathy C. Waegner in European Journal of American Studies cites A Council of Dolls as a modern iteration of Indigenous traditions that use puppets and dolls to interrogate experiences with colonialism.

Dakota author Gabrielle Tateyuskanskan of the Oceti Sakowin Writers Society praised A Council of Dolls for bringing to light the experiences of boarding school survivors and their descendants, and relates events in the book to recorded abuses at boarding schools raised in legal cases and academic studies.

A Council of Dolls illustrates the horrible legacy and emotional toll of medical neglect, mental abuse, disease, malnourishment, use of child labor, sexual abuse, and physically abusive conditions that wakaneja [children] endured while attending boarding school. Due to adverse childhood experiences, many young people did not survive boarding school and their resting places are in marked and unmarked school graveyards across America. These children were never returned to their grieving families. In many cases the records of burial sites and their locations have been lost. Families then suffer as a result of those wakaneja who have disappeared. This story describes the results of 150 years of stress, anguish, and feelings of powerlessness of parents, the tiwahe [family] and the Oyate [nation] due to the loss of their cherished children to inhumane educational institutions. These schools were places where wakaneja should have been protected, educated and nurtured.

— Gabrielle Tateyuskanskan (Oceti Sakowin Writers Society), A Council of Dolls: A Novel by Mona Susan Power (review)

Centers for the Book of the Library of Congress selected A Council of Dolls as one of Minnesota's "Great Reads for Adults". The novel was featured in The New Yorker's Best Books of 2023. Good Housekeeping recommended it as part of their GH Book Club, and as sixth out of thirty "must-read" books by Native authors. People, Washington Post, USA Today, Electric Literature, Shondaland, the Washington Library Association publication Alki, and The News-Gazette also highlighted the novel. It was the November 2024 Target Book Club Pick.

== Awards ==
A Council of Dolls was longlisted for the 2023 National Book Award for Fiction and the 2024 Carol Shields Prize for Fiction, and won the 2024 Minnesota Book Awards category for novel. The novel won the woman writer category for the High Plains Book Awards, which honors books about the High Plains region in the U.S. and Canada.

Awards and nominations for A Council of Dolls
Year	Award	Category	Result	Ref.
2023	National Book Award	Fiction	Longlisted	
2024	Carol Shields Prize for Fiction	—	Longlisted	
2024	Minnesota Book Awards	Novel	Won	
2024	High Plains Book Awards	Woman Writer	Won	
2024	Nautilus Book Awards	Fiction (Large Publisher/Large Hybrid)	Gold	

Although A Council of Dolls was not selected by the jury for the 2025 RUSA Listen List for outstanding audiobook narration, it was highlighted with the winners.

=== Notable lists ===
- 2023 American Indians in Children's Literature (AICL) Year In Review: Crossover Books
- 2023 Chicago Public Library Must-Read Books of 2023: Fiction
- 2025 RUSA Listen List
- 2025 Robert S. Peabody Institute of Archaeology Peabody Picks

== Editions ==
A Council of Dolls is also available as an audiobook from HarperAudio, read by actress Isabella Star LaBlanc (Sisseton Wahpeton Oyate) (ISBN 9780063281127), and in ebook (ISBN 9780063281110) and large print format (ISBN 9798885796194).

Minnesota State Services for the Blind read the book live on-air in a twelve part broadcast series starting May 28, 2024, part of their Radio Talking Book program, which communicates publications such as newspapers, magazines, and popular books via radio 24-hours a day. The Minnesota Braille and Talking Book Library and the National Library Service for the Blind and Print Disabled hold copies in large print and downloadable audiobook (eAudiobook) format.
