= Let Him Go (novel) =

Book by Larry Watson

- First edition cover
- Author: Larry Watson
- Language: English
- Genre: Western drama
- Published: September 3, 2013
- Publisher: Milkweed Editions
- Publication place: United States
- Media type: Print, e-book
- Pages: 256 pages
- ISBN: 9781571311023

Let Him Go is a 2013 American neo-Western drama novel by Larry Watson. The book was released on September 3, 2013, through Milkweed Editions.

== Film adaptation ==
Focus Features released a film adaptation of the book on November 6, 2020, directed by Thomas Bezucha. The film stars Diane Lane, Kevin Costner and Lesley Manville.

== See also ==
- Let Him Go
