= List of Diane Lane performances =

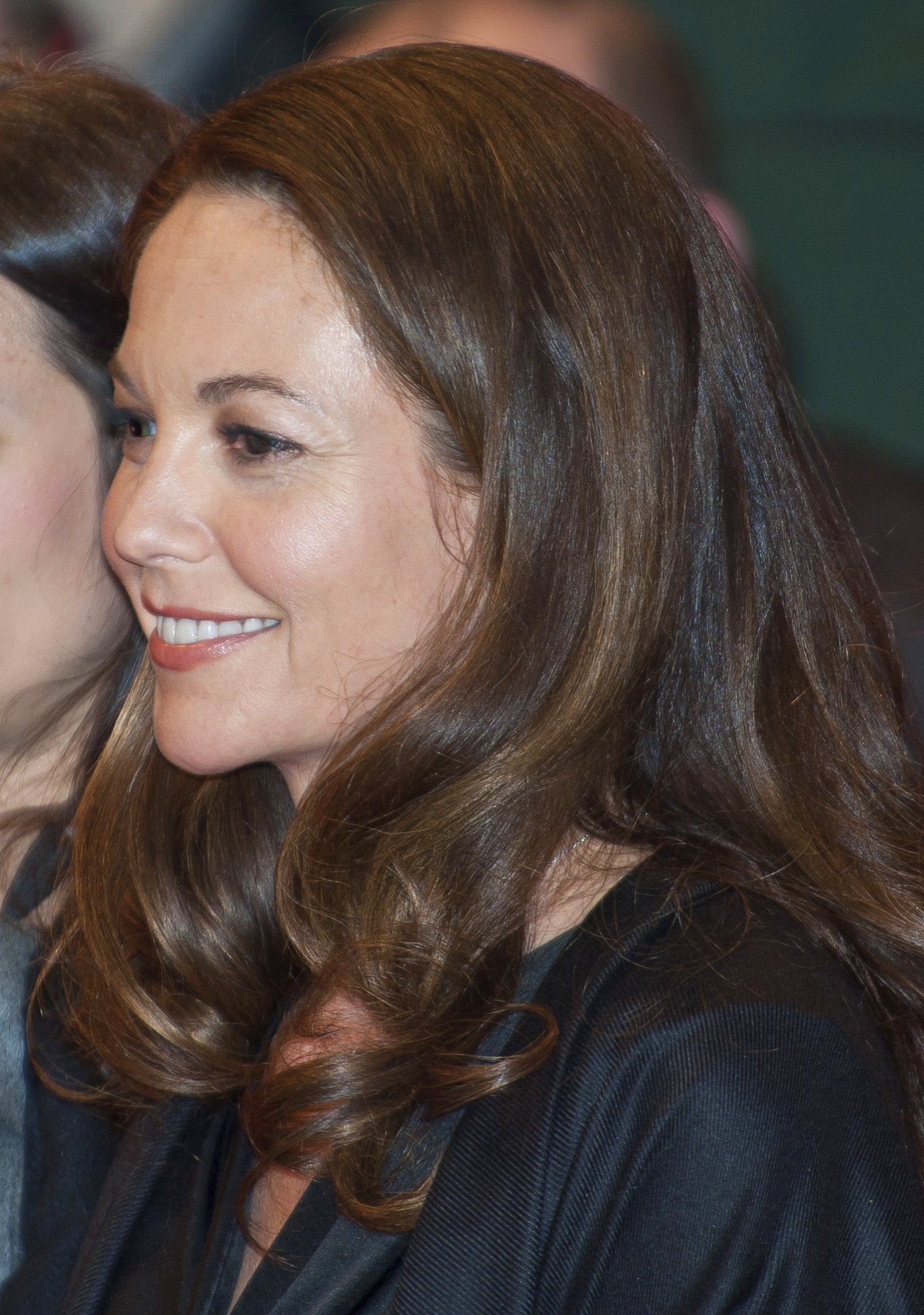
Lane attending the premiere of True Grit at the Berlin International Film Festival in 2011.

Diane Lane is an acclaimed American actress who made her motion picture debut in George Roy Hill's 1979 film A Little Romance.

Lane would earn critical acclaim for her performance as Constance "Connie" Sumner in Adrian Lyne's 2002 film Unfaithful, and was nominated for the Academy Award for Best Actress, in addition to nominations for the Golden Globe and Screen Actors Guild Award.

Other notable film credits for Lane include The Outsiders (1983), The Perfect Storm (2000), Under the Tuscan Sun (2003), and as Martha Kent in Zack Snyder's films Man of Steel (2013), Batman v Superman: Dawn of Justice (2016), Justice League (2017), and its director's cut, Zack Snyder's Justice League (2021).

== Film ==
Year	Title	Role	Notes
1979	A Little Romance	Lauren King	
1980	Touched by Love	Karen Brown	
1981	Cattle Annie and Little Britches	Jenny "Little Britches" Stevens	
1982	National Lampoon's Movie Madness	Liza	
1982	Six Pack	Heather "Breezy" Aikens	
1982	Ladies and Gentlemen, The Fabulous Stains	Corinne Burns	
1983	The Outsiders	Sherri "Cherry" Valance	
1983	Rumble Fish	Patty	
1984	Streets of Fire	Ellen Aim	
1984	The Cotton Club	Vera Cicero	
1987	Lady Beware	Katya Yarno	
1987	The Big Town	Lorry Dane	
1988	Love Dream	China	
1990	Vital Signs	Gina Wyler	
1992	Knight Moves	Kathy Sheppard	
1992	My New Gun	Debbie Bender	
1992	The Setting Sun	Lian Hong	
1992	Chaplin	Paulette Goddard	
1993	Indian Summer	Beth Warden	
1995	Judge Dredd	Judge Barbara Hershey	
1995	Wild Bill	Susannah Moore	
1996	Jack	Karen Powell	
1996	Mad Dog Time	Grace Everly	
1997	The Only Thrill	Katherine Fitzsimmons	
1997	Murder at 1600	USSS Agent Nina Chance	
1998	Gunshy	Dr. Melissa	
1999	A Walk on the Moon	Pearl Kantrowitz	
2000	My Dog Skip	Ellen Morris	
2000	The Perfect Storm	Christina "Chris" Cotter	
2001	The Glass House	Erin Glass	
2001	Hardball	Elizabeth Wilkes	
2002	Unfaithful	Connie Sumner	
2002	Searching for Debra Winger	Herself	Documentary film
2003	Under the Tuscan Sun	Frances Mayes	
2005	Fierce People	Liz Earl	
2005	Must Love Dogs	Sarah Nolan	
2006	Hollywoodland	Toni Mannix	
2008	Untraceable	FBI Agent Jennifer Marsh	
2008	Jumper	Mary Rice	
2008	Nights in Rodanthe	Adrienne Willis	
2009	Killshot	Carmen Colson	
2010	Secretariat	Penny Chenery	
2012	Casting By	Herself	Documentary film
2013	Man of Steel	Martha Kent	
2014	Every Secret Thing	Helen Manning	
2015	Inside Out	Riley's Mom	Voice
2015	Riley's First Date?	Riley's Mom	Voice; short film
2015	Trumbo	Cleo Trumbo	
2016	Batman v Superman: Dawn of Justice	Martha Kent	
2017	Paris Can Wait	Anne Lockwood	
2017	Mark Felt: The Man Who Brought Down the White House	Audrey Felt	
2017	Justice League	Martha Kent	
2018	Tully	Corrine ‘Third Degree’ Burns	
2019	Serenity	Constance	
2020	Let Him Go	Margaret Blackledge	
2021	Zack Snyder's Justice League	Martha Kent	Director’s Cut of Justice League
2024	Inside Out 2	Riley's Mom	Voice
2025	Anniversary	Ellen Taylor	
2027	The Exorcist: Martyrs	Mary Miller	Post-production

== Television ==
Year	Title	Role	Notes
1981	Great Performances	Charity Royall	Episode: "Summer"
1981	Child Bride of Short Creek	Jessica Rae Jacobs	Television film
1982	Miss All-American Beauty	Sally Butterfield	Television film
1989	Lonesome Dove	Lorena Wood	Miniseries; 4 episodes
1990	Descending Angel	Irina Stroia	Television film
1993	Fallen Angels	Bernette Stone	Episode: "Murder, Obliquely"
1994	Oldest Living Confederate Widow Tells All	Lucy Honicut Marsden	Miniseries
1995	A Streetcar Named Desire	Stella Kowalski	Television film
1998	Grace and Glorie	Gloria Greenwood	Television film
2000	The Virginian	Molly Stark	Television film
2011	Cinema Verite	Pat Loud	Television film
2012	Half the Sky	Herself	Documentary film
2018	The Romanoffs	Katherine Ford	2 episodes
2018	House of Cards	Annette Shepherd	Main role, 7 episodes
2021	Y: The Last Man	Senator Jennifer Brown	Main role, 10 episodes
2023	Extrapolations	Martha Russell	Episode: "2059: Face of God"
2024	Feud: Capote vs. The Swans	Slim Keith	8 episodes
2024	A Man in Full	Martha Croker	Netflix miniseries
2024	Dream Productions	Riley's Mom	Voice; 4 Episodes

== Stage ==
Year	Title	Role	Theatre/company	Notes
1971–76	The Trojan Women, Electra, The Good Woman of Szechuan, Blood Wedding, The Silver Queen, As You Like It	Various	La MaMa, E.T.C.	Performed in New York and toured abroad
1976–77	The Cherry Orchard	Ensemble (child peasant)	Vivian Beaumont Theater at Lincoln Center (New York)	Broadway; New York Shakespeare Festival
1976–77	Agamemnon	Iphigenia	Vivian Beaumont Theatre at Lincoln Center (New York)	Broadway; New York Shakespeare Festival
1978	Runaways	Jackie	The Public Theater (New York)	Off-Broadway
1989	Twelfth Night	Olivia	American Repertory Theater (Cambridge, MA)	Shakespeare play
2012	Sweet Bird of Youth	Alexandra Del Lago / Princess Kosmonopolis	Goodman Theatre (Chicago)	
2015	The Mystery of Love and Sex	Lucinda	Mitzi Newhouse Theatre at Lincoln Center (New York)	Off-Broadway
2016	The Cherry Orchard	Madam Ranevskya	American Airlines Theatre, Roundabout Theatre (New York)	Broadway
