= Kayli Carter =

American actress (born 1993)

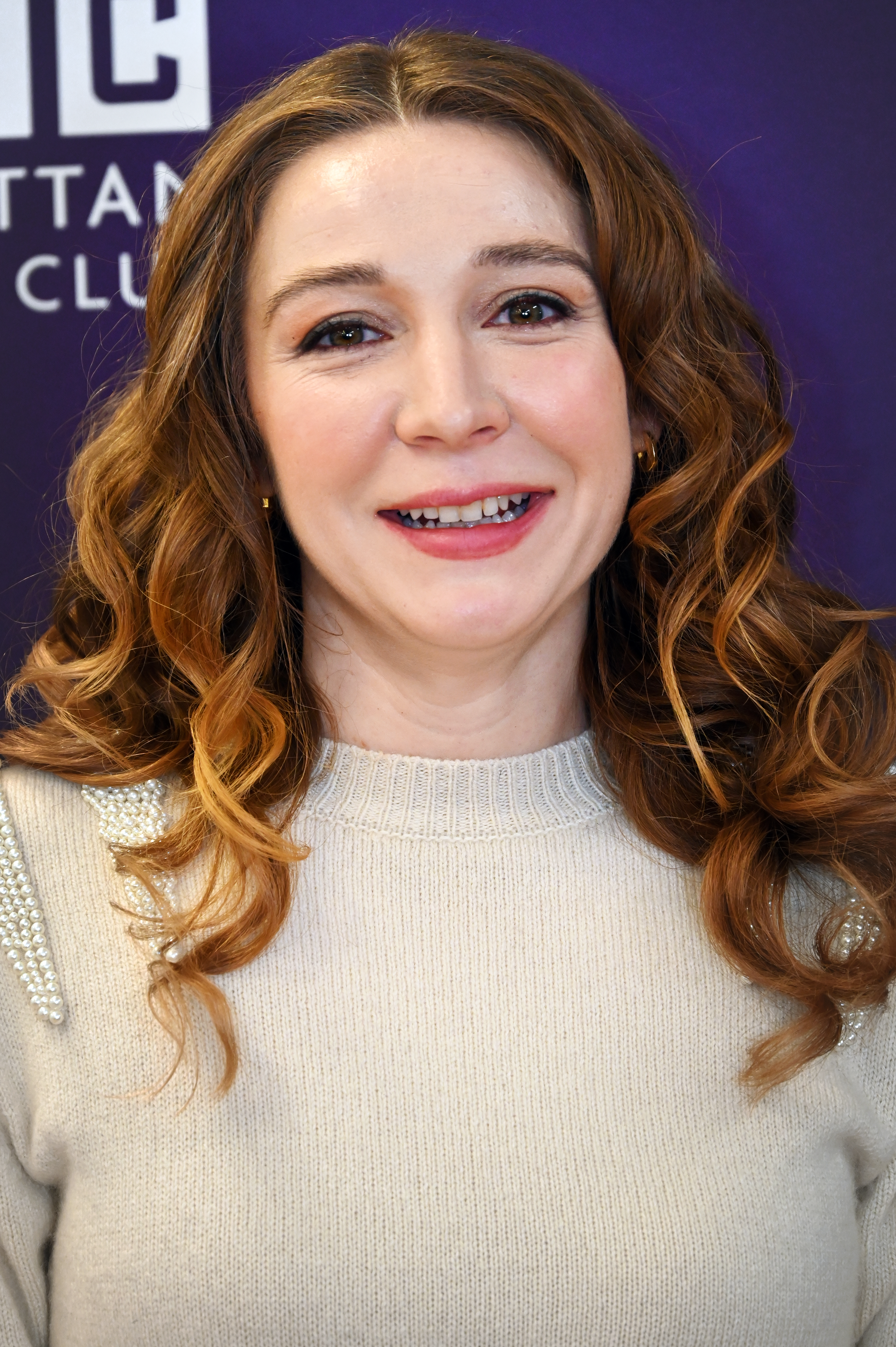
- Carter in 2026
- Born: July 8, 1993 (age 32); Oviedo, Florida, U.S.
- Education: Savannah College of Art and Design (BFA)
- Occupation: Actress
- Years active: 2013–present

Kayli Carter (born July 8, 1993) is an American actress. She portrayed Sadie Rose in the Netflix western TV series Godless and Amber McCarden in the film Bad Education, opposite Hugh Jackman and Allison Janney. Her role in Private Life earned a nomination for an Independent Spirit Award for Best Supporting Female.

== Early life and education ==
Carter was raised in Oviedo, Florida, and later in Chuluota, Florida. Her father works in construction, and her mother is a therapist. She studied acting at the Savannah College of Art and Design, earning a Bachelor of Fine Arts degree in performing arts. Carter has performed on stage in her first professional theater role in Mark Rylance's play Nice Fish on The West End in London, at St. Ann's Warehouse in Brooklyn, New York City and at the American Repertory Theater in Cambridge, Massachusetts.

== Career ==
In 2017, Carter starred as Sadie Rose in the Netflix western TV series Godless, alongside Michelle Dockery, Merritt Wever, and Jeff Daniels. The same year, she teamed up with Merritt Wever again to play Squeaky Fromme in the Mary Harron-directed Charles Manson biographical drama film Charlie Says alongside Hannah Murray and Matt Smith.

In 2019, she starred as Amber McCarden in the film Bad Education, opposite Hugh Jackman and Allison Janney. Carter played Pamela in the 2020 TV mini-series Mrs. America alongside Cate Blanchett. Carter also portrayed Lorna Blackledge, the daughter-in-law of a retired sheriff (Kevin Costner) and his wife (Diane Lane) in Universal Pictures' 2020 film Let Him Go.

In 2021, Carter joined the cast of The Marvelous Mrs. Maisel in a recurring role.

== Filmography ==
=== Film ===
Year	Title	Role	Ref.
2017	Rings	Evelyn Borden (née Osorio)	
2018	Private Life	Sadie Barrett	
2018	Charlie Says	Squeaky Fromme	
2019	Bad Education	Amber McCarden	
2020	Let Him Go	Lorna Blackledge	
2023	I'll Be Right There	Sarah	
2024	A Complete Unknown	Maria Muldaur	

=== Television ===
Year	Title	Role	Notes	Ref.
2015	The Weekend Detectives	Partygoer	Episode: "Party's Over"	
2015	Z: The Beginning of Everything	Belle	1 episode	
2017	Godless	Sadie Rose	7 episodes	
2018	Chicago Med	Tara	Episode: "Backed Against the Wall"	
2020	Mrs. America	Pamela	9 episodes	
2021	The Marvelous Mrs. Maisel	Gloria	Season 4; 4 episodes	
2022	Evil	Amalia	Season 3, episode: "The Demon of Sex"	
2026	Vladimir	Lila	7 episodes	

== Awards and nominations ==
Year	Award	Category	Nominated work	Result	Ref.
2018	Savannah College of Art and Design Film Festival	SCAD40 Prize	Graduates career - highest rank	Won	
2018	Indiana Film Journalists Association	Best Supporting Actress	Private Life	Nominated	
2019	Film Independent Spirit Awards	Best Supporting Female	Private Life	Nominated	
2019	Hamptons International Film Festival	Breakthrough Artist	Private Life	Won	
