= Josephine Gates Kelly =

Native American activist (1888–1976)

- Born: Josephine Gates; January 24, 1888; Cannon Ball, North Dakota, U.S.
- Died: October 23, 1976 (aged 88)
- Known for: First female tribal chair in the United States
- Spouse: Covin Kelly (m. 1920)
- Children: 7
- Mother: Nellie Two Bears Gates

Josephine Gates Kelly (January 24, 1888 – October 23, 1976) was a Native American activist. In 1946, she became the first female chair of a tribal council in United States history when she was elected Tribal Chair of the Standing Rock Sioux Reservation.

== Biography ==
Josephine Gates Kelly was born on January 24, 1888, in Cannon Ball, North Dakota. Her parents were Nellie Two Bears Gates and Frank Gates.

In 1902, Kelly left Standing Rock to enroll at the Carlisle Indian School in Pennsylvania. She graduated in 1909, becoming the first female graduate of Carlisle from her reservation. Following her graduation, she worked for the governor of North Dakota as a stenographer.

Kelly began her involvement in politics in the 1930s, specifically the politics of the Native Americans and the Nonpartisan League. During this time, she hitchhiked to Washington, D.C. so that she could protest portions of the Indian Reorganization Act.

In 1940, Kelly was elected to serve as a member of the Standing Rock Tribal Council.

In 1944, she attended the National Republican Convention in Chicago, Illinois, as a delegate.

In November 1946, she was elected Tribal Chair. This made her the first female Tribal Chair in the history of the United States. During her tenure she advocated for the improvement of conditions on the Standing Rock reservation. She was re-elected every year until 1951.

In the early 1950s, Kelly assisted in the establishment of a memorial in Valley Forge, Pennsylvania, in honor of Native Americans who were killed serving in the United States Armed Forces.

Josephine Gates Kelly died on October 23, 1976. She was 88 years old.

== Personal life ==
She married Covin Kelly in 1920; the two had seven children. Her youngest son was named Louis; he was killed while serving in the military and buried at Arlington National Cemetery. A daughter of hers, Susan Kelly Power, was one of the co-founders of the American Indian Center in Chicago, Illinois.
