= Birchbark Books =

Bookstore founded by Louise Erdrich

Birchbark Books and Native Arts

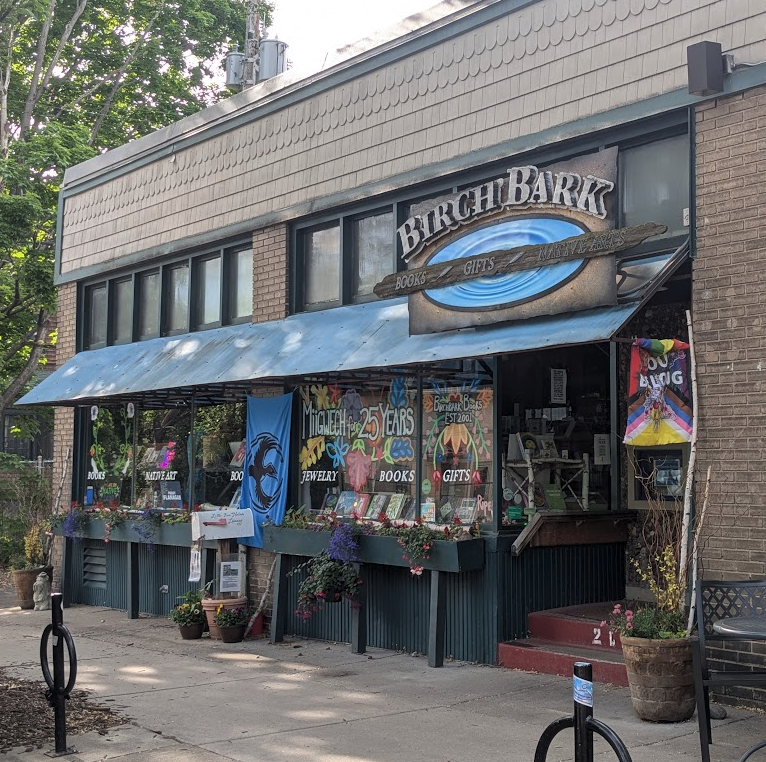
- Industry: bookstore; gift shop
- Founded: 2001; 25 years ago in Minneapolis, Minnesota, United States
- Areas served: Minneapolis–Saint Paul metropolitan area
- Products: Native American literature; Native American art
- Owner: Louise Erdrich
- Website: birchbarkbooks.com

Birchbark Books, also known by its full name, Birchbark Books & Native Arts, is an independent bookstore in Minneapolis, Minnesota in the Kenwood neighborhood. Selling both books and works of art, it was founded by Pulitzer Prize–winning Native American novelist Louise Erdrich (Turtle Mountain Band of Chippewa Indians) in 2001.

The physical location in the Kenwood neighborhood of Minneapolis is known as Birchbark Books and the online art ecommerce storefront is known as Birchbark Native Arts. An event space and warehouse called Birchbark Bizhew or Birchbark Lynx debuted in April 2023. The business is collectively called Birchbark Books and Native Art.

The physical location focuses on Native books and art, and sells some non-Native products. The online store sells only Native products.

Birchbark carries a variety of Native-authored literature in genres such as fiction, history, spirituality, education, and language. They focus on stocking little-known and up-and-coming Native authors and materials. A significant Dakota and Ojibwe language section is stocked with children's picture books, language learning materials, and adult literature. Staff personally choose the books stocked and handwritten signs on the shelves give recommendations to customers.

The interior of the store is decorated with Native art and the space was designed by Native artists. A large canoe hangs from the ceiling, the children's area has a loft styled like a tree house with a Hobbit hole underneath, and an altar installation is decorated with owner Erdrich's sins.

Birchbark is part of the Midwest Independent Booksellers Association.

Owner Erdrich has said that Birchbark is haunted.

== History ==
Louise Erdrich founded the bookstore in 2001 as a "a tiny general-interest shop with a concentration in Native American or Indigenous writing: fiction, poetry, history, politics, food, memoir and material that supports Indigenous language revitalization, particularly the Ojibwe and Dakota languages." The bookstore also sells pieces handcrafted by indigenous artists, such as baskets, beadwork, and jewelry, while also showcasing indigenous craftsmanship in its construction, from its hanging canoe to its building made from cedar wood and birch logs.

In 2011, when the bookstore's neighbor, Kenwood Café, closed down, Birchbark Books saw sales plummet, after which Erdrich questioned whether she could still sustain her bookstore. Thanks to a community effort from customers and neighbors, however, Erdrich was able to raise enough money to sustain Birchbark Books temporarily until business resumed as normal in the neighborhood.

An events space, Birchbark Books has hosted authors like Angela Davis, Tommy Orange, Gerald Vizenor, Marcie Rendon, Teresa Peterson, Diane Wilson, and others. The bookstore has also collaborated with galleries and churches to showcase indigenous art.

=== Birchbark Bizhew ===
During the COVID-19 pandemic, the bookstore closed its storefront and instead fulfilled online orders. Southwest Voices reported that the bookstore's sales "skyrocketed" after 2020. To help with fulfillment, the bookstore occupied a space near Loring Corners, a building near Loring Park and the Walker Art Center. Three years later, in 2023, the bookstore permanently established a space in Loring Corners called Birchbark Bizhiw or Birchbark Lynx, which is dedicated to events for indigenous authors and artists. Past authors and artists include Monique Gray Smith, Carole Lindstrom, and Sky Hopinka. Products from indigenous companies—such as Native Wisdom Skincare, Makwa Studio, Romona Farms and Seka Hills—and local artists are sold.

PEN Award-winning author Mona Susan Power held the release party for National Book Award-longlisted A Council of Dolls at Birchbark Bizhew.
