= List of awards and nominations received by Diane Lane =

Diane Lane awards and nominations
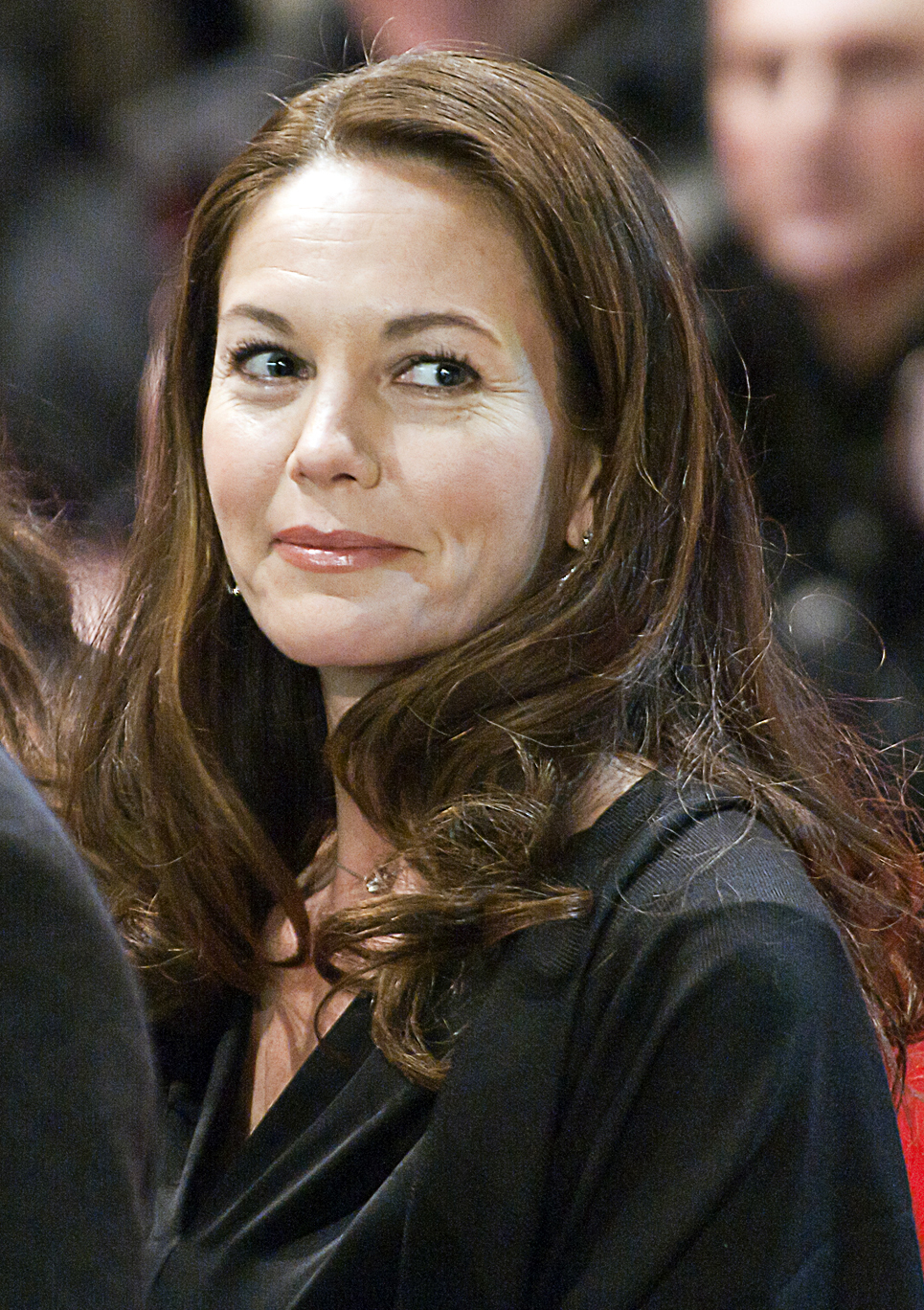
- Lane at the Berlin International Film Festival in 2011
Awards and nominations (Note: Certain award groups do not simply award one winner, as they may recognize several recipients and have runners-up. Since this is a specific recognition and is different from losing an award, runner-up mentions are considered wins in the awards tally.) (Note: Awards in certain categories do not have prior nominations and only winners are announced by the jury. For simplification and to avoid errors, each award in this list has been presumed to have had a prior nomination.) (Note: Organizations without a Wikipedia page are not included in list of accolades.)
| Award | Wins | Nominations |
Totals
| Academy Awards | 0 | 1 |
| Blockbuster Entertainment Awards | 0 | 1 |
| Chicago Film Critics Association | 0 | 1 |
| Critics' Choice Movie Awards | 0 | 1 |
| Golden Globe Awards | 0 | 3 |
| Hollywood Film Awards | 1 | 0 |
| Independent Spirit Awards | 0 | 1 |
| National Society of Film Critics | 1 | 0 |
| New York Film Critics Circle | 1 | 0 |
| Primetime Emmy Awards | 0 | 3 |
| Satellite Awards | 1 | 2 |
| Screen Actors Guild Awards | 0 | 3 |
| Vancouver Film Critics Circle | 0 | 1 |
| Women's Image Network Awards | 1 | 1 |
| Young Artist Award | 3 | 2 |
| Wins | 8 |
| Nominations | 19 |

This is a list of awards and nominations for acclaimed American actress Diane Lane.

== Awards and nominations ==
| Association | Year | Category | Nominated work | Result | Ref. |
|---|---|---|---|---|---|
| AARP Movies for Grown Ups Awards | 2009 | Best Grownup Love Story (shared with Richard Gere) | Nights in Rodanthe | Nominated | |
| Academy Awards | 2003 | Best Actress | Unfaithful | Nominated | |
| Almería Western Film Festival | 2021 | Best Actress | Let Him Go | Won | |
| Behind the Voice Actors Awards | 2016 | Best Vocal Ensemble in a Feature Film | Inside Out | Won | |
| Blockbuster Entertainment Awards | 2001 | Favorite Supporting Actress — Drama | The Perfect Storm | Nominated | |
| Chicago Film Critics Association Awards | 2003 | Best Actress | Unfaithful | Nominated | |
| Critics Choice Movie Awards | 2003 | Best Actress | Unfaithful | Nominated | |
| Gold Derby Awards | 2003 | Lead Actress | Unfaithful | Nominated | |
| Gold Derby Awards | 2011 | TV Movie/Miniseries Lead Actress | Cinema Verite | Nominated | |
| Golden Globe Awards | 2003 | Best Actress in a Motion Picture — Drama | Unfaithful | Nominated | |
| Golden Globe Awards | 2004 | Best Actress in a Motion Picture — Comedy or Musical | Under the Tuscan Sun | Nominated | |
| Golden Globe Awards | 2012 | Best Actress in a Miniseries or Motion Picture Made for Television | Cinema Verite | Nominated | |
| Golden Raspberry Awards | 1985 | Worst Supporting Actress | Streets of Fire; The Cotton Club | Nominated | |
| Golden Schmoes Awards | 2002 | Best Actress of the Year | Unfaithful | Nominated | |
| Golden Schmoes Awards | 2002 | Best T&A of the Year | Unfaithful | Nominated | |
| Hollywood Film Awards | 2003 | Actress of the Year | Unfaithful | Won | |
| International Online Cinema Awards | 2003 | Best Actress | Unfaithful | Nominated | |
| Italian Online Movie Awards | 2003 | Best Actress | Unfaithful | Nominated | |
| Independent Spirit Awards | 2000 | Best Female Lead | A Walk on the Moon | Nominated | |
| Las Vegas Film Critics Society Awards | 2000 | Best Actress | A Walk on the Moon | Nominated | |
| National Society of Film Critics Awards | 2003 | Best Actress | Unfaithful | Won | |
| New York Film Critics Circle Awards | 2002 | Best Actress | Unfaithful | Won | |
| OFTA Film Awards | 2003 | Best Actress | Unfaithful | Nominated | |
| OFTA Television Awards | 2011 | Best Actress in a Motion Picture or Miniseries | Cinema Verite | Nominated | |
| Online Film Critics Society Awards | 2003 | Best Actress | Unfaithful | Nominated | |
| Phoenix Film Critics Society Awards | 2003 | Best Lead Actress | Unfaithful | Nominated | |
| Primetime Emmy Awards | 1989 | Outstanding Lead Actress in a Miniseries or a Special | Lonesome Dove | Nominated | |
| Primetime Emmy Awards | 2011 | Outstanding Lead Actress in a Miniseries or Movie | Cinema Verite | Nominated | |
| Primetime Emmy Awards | 2024 | Outstanding Supporting Actress in a Limited or Anthology Series or Movie | Feud: Capote vs. The Swans | Nominated | |
| Satellite Awards | 2003 | Best Actress in a Motion Picture — Drama | Unfaithful | Won | |
| Satellite Awards | 2004 | Best Actress in a Motion Picture — Comedy or Musical | Under the Tuscan Sun | Nominated | |
| Satellite Awards | 2011 | Best Actress in a Miniseries or a Motion Picture Made for Television | Cinema Verite | Nominated | |
| Satellite Awards | 2024 | Best Actress in a Supporting Role in a Series, Miniseries & Limited Series, or Motion Picture Made for Television | Feud: Capote vs. The Swans | Won | |
| Satellite Awards | 2025 | Best Actress in a Motion Picture — Drama | Anniversary | Nominated | |
| Screen Actors Guild Awards | 2003 | Outstanding Performance by a Female Actor in a Leading Role | Unfaithful | Nominated | |
| Screen Actors Guild Awards | 2012 | Outstanding Performance by a Female Actor in a Television Movie or Miniseries | Cinema Verite | Nominated | |
| Screen Actors Guild Awards | 2016 | Outstanding Performance by a Cast in a Motion Picture | Trumbo | Nominated | |
| Vancouver Film Critics Circle Awards | 2003 | Best Actress | Unfaithful | Nominated | |
| Western Heritage Awards | 2001 | Television Feature Film (principal actor) | The Virginian | Won | |
| Women's Image Network Awards | 2010 | Actress Feature Film | Secretariat | Nominated | |
| Women's Image Network Awards | 2011 | Actress Made for Television Movie/Miniseries | Cinema Verite | Won | |
| Young Artist Awards | 1980 | Best Juvenile Actress in a Motion Picture — The Sybil Jason Award | A Little Romance | Won | |
| Young Artist Awards | 1980 | Best Juvenile Actress in a Motion Picture | A Little Romance | Won | |
| Young Artist Awards | 1981 | Best Young Actress in a Major Motion Picture | Touched by Love | Won | |
| Young Artist Awards | 1984 | Best Young Motion Picture Actress in a Feature Film | Rumble Fish | Nominated | |
| Young Artist Awards | 1984 | Best Young Supporting Actress in a Motion Picture | The Outsiders | Nominated | |
