= Private Life (2018 film) =

2018 film by Tamara Jenkins

- Official release poster by Chris Ware
- Directed by: Tamara Jenkins
- Written by: Tamara Jenkins
- Produced by: Anthony Bregman; Stefanie Azpiazu; Tamara Jenkins
- Starring: Paul Giamatti; Kathryn Hahn; Kayli Carter; Molly Shannon; John Carroll Lynch; Desmin Borges; Denis O'Hare
- Cinematography: Christos Voudouris
- Edited by: Brian A. Kates
- Production company: Likely Story
- Distributed by: Netflix
- Release dates: January 18, 2018 (Sundance); October 5, 2018 (United States)
- Running time: 123 minutes
- Country: United States
- Language: English

Private Life is a 2018 American comedy-drama film written and directed by Tamara Jenkins and starring Paul Giamatti and Kathryn Hahn, with Kayli Carter, Molly Shannon, John Carroll Lynch, Desmin Borges, and Denis O'Hare in supporting roles. The film focuses on Richard and Rachel, a middle-aged married couple of New York City creatives, who are desperately trying to have a child by any means possible.

The film had its world premiere on January 18 at the Sundance Film Festival. It was released on October 5, 2018, by Netflix.

== Plot ==
Richard and Rachel are a middle-aged couple desperately trying to have a child. After multiple failed attempts at artificial insemination, they attempt in vitro fertilization. The couple learn that Richard has a blockage that is not letting him produce sperm, forcing him to undergo a surgery that puts him $10,000 in debt to his brother Charlie and his wife Cynthia. At the same time, they are attempting to adopt a child and participate in an interview with a social worker. Some time before, Richard and Rachel became connected with a supposedly pregnant teenager from Little Rock, Arkansas. Upon traveling to Arkansas, the teenager abruptly stopped contact, leading Richard and Rachel to believe they had been victims of an emotional scam.

After the IVF fails, their doctor floats the idea of using a donor egg to implant in Rachel, raising their chances of success from 4 to 65 percent. Rachel is initially against it, but slowly begins to consider it with Richard's encouragement.

Meanwhile, their 25-year-old niece, Sadie, decides to leave her writing program at Bard College to finish in absentia and live in New York City with Richard and Rachel, with whom she is very close. Rachel, who struggled with the idea of an unknown egg donor, decides to ask Sadie for her eggs. To their surprise, Sadie quickly agrees, both because she loves Richard and Rachel and because she thinks the egg donation will bring meaning to her life.

At Thanksgiving dinner, Sadie informs her family that she will be donating her egg to Richard and Rachel, much to her mother's chagrin. Despite the fact that Richard and Rachel tell Cynthia they will not go through with the donation without her consent, they decide to begin the pre-screening process.

Richard, Rachel, and Sadie happily go through the egg donor treatments together, but Sadie is told at an appointment that she is not developing eggs quickly enough. Determined not to let Richard and Rachel down, she increases her drug dosage on her own. The egg retrieval is a success, but Sadie becomes ill. Richard and Rachel take her to the hospital, where they learn of the increased dosage. Sadie moves out of their apartment.

Richard and Rachel go through with the implantation, but it is a failure. While Rachel is devastated, Richard admits to being relieved that they are finally done with trying, as their marriage and intimacy have suffered.

Sometime later, they drop Sadie off at the Yaddo colony, where she will take up a residency as a writer. She thanks Rachel for her help getting in, but Rachel informs her she did nothing to aid her application and that Sadie did it on her own.

Nine months later, Rachel receives a call from another woman looking at them as potential parents to adopt her child. They drive to a restaurant in Virginia, where they wait to meet the woman. Richard moves from his usual opposite seat and sits next to Rachel to hold her hand.

== Cast ==
- Kathryn Hahn as Rachel Biegler
- Paul Giamatti as Richard Grimes
- Kayli Carter as Sadie Barrett
- Molly Shannon as Cynthia Grimes
- Denis O'Hare as Dr. Dordick
- Emily Robinson as Charlotte Grimes
- John Carroll Lynch as Charlie Grimes
- Desmin Borges as Sam
- Francesca Root-Dodson as Fiona
- Siobhan Fallon Hogan as Beth

== Production ==
On January 4, 2017, it was reported that Kathryn Hahn would star in the Netflix film Private Life, written and directed by Tamara Jenkins. On January 31, 2017, Paul Giamatti joined the cast. On March 16, 2017, it was reported that Molly Shannon, Emily Robinson, John Carroll Lynch, Kayli Carter, and Francesca Root-Dodson would also play roles in the film. As of March 17, 2017, principal photography had begun in White Plains, New York. Denis O'Hare and Desmin Borges subsequently joined the film as well.

== Release ==
The film had its world premiere at the Sundance Film Festival on January 18, 2018. It also screened at the New York Film Festival on October 1, 2018. Netflix released Private Life on October 5, 2018, both in a limited theatrical bow and on its service.

== Reception ==
=== Critical response ===
The film received critical acclaim. On review aggregator website Rotten Tomatoes, the film holds an approval rating of 93% based on 106 reviews, with an average rating of 7.6/10. The site's critics consensus reads, "Private Life uses one couple's bumpy journey to take an affecting look at an easily identifiable – and too rarely dramatized – rite of adult passage." On Metacritic, the film holds a rating of 83 out of 100, based on 32 critics, indicating "universal acclaim".

=== Accolades ===
Award	Date of ceremony	Category	Recipient(s) and nominee(s)	Result	Ref(s)
Gotham Awards	November 26, 2018	Best Actress	Kathryn Hahn	Nominated	
Gotham Awards	November 26, 2018	Best Screenplay	Tamara Jenkins	Nominated	
Satellite Awards	February 17, 2019	Best Independent Film		Nominated	
Independent Spirit Awards	February 23, 2019	Best Director	Tamara Jenkins	Nominated	
Independent Spirit Awards	February 23, 2019	Best Screenplay	Tamara Jenkins	Nominated	
Independent Spirit Awards	February 23, 2019	Best Supporting Female	Kayli Carter	Nominated	
South African Film Online Critics Circle	December 17, 2018	Best Supporting Actress	Kayli Carter	Won	
