= The Grass Dancer =

1994 novel by Susan Power

- Author: Susan Power
- Cover artist: Honi Werner
- Language: English
- Genre: Fiction
- Publisher: Putnam Adult; 1st edition
- Publication date: August 1994
- Publication place: United States
- Media type: Hardcover
- Pages: 300
- ISBN: 0399139117
- Followed by: Roofwalker

The Grass Dancer is the 1994 debut novel by Susan Power.

== Plot ==
Prologue: Crowns of Glass – Harley dreams of his father and his brother often. He remembers the crash they died in before Harley was born. Henry Burger was drinking and angry about his wife's (Jeannette Mcvay) infidelity. Burger caused a head-on collision with Calvin Wind Soldier and Duane while trying to send the imaginary eyes he saw into hell.

Chapter 1: Grass Dancers – Set in 1981 at the Dakota Days Contest Powwow. In this chapter the reader is introduced to all of the main characters. At the powwow, Pumpkin does a Grass Dance, which is untraditional for a woman to do. After the powwow Pumpkin spent the night with Harley Wind Soldier. The next night Pumpkin and her friends die in a car crash.

Chapter 2: Christianity Comes to the Sioux – this chapter focuses on Harley Wind Soldier as an eighth grader in 1977. Harley internalizes his thoughts about his teacher, Jeanette McVeigh. He watches her behavior toward the students in his class, and observes she is trying too hard. Jeanette studies the culture in books, then applies it to the students, even when it may be out of context. Harley also sees Star Wars for the first time. It was so good, he sees it twice and identifies with the story and characters. This chapter also discusses how Christianity came to the reservation. The Missouri River runs through the reservation, and the river brought boats. On one of the boats came a piano, and gospel music was played. The piano allowed Christianity to take hold, as the tribe appreciated the music from the instrument.

Chapter 3: The Medicine Hole – This chapter takes place in 1976 and is told from the point of view of Herod Small War. Archie Iron Necklace has a dream about Native soldiers escaping from marksmen through the opening of a medicine hole in the ground. Upon revealing this dream to Herod in a Yuwipi ceremony, Archie, Herod, Frank, and Harley set out to find the medicine hole. While looking for it, they stumble upon the abandoned and haunted house of a white woman named Clara Miller. Herod Small War once worked for her in 1921 and engaged in an affair with her, as his wife refused to have sex with him because of certain Sioux traditions related to their newly born children. Archie Iron Necklace was the one who discovered this affair, and beat up Herod for doing so, since Archie is also in love with Alberta, Herod's wife. Because a storm rolled in that night, the boys took shelter in Clara's home, where her spirit then helped to reveal that Herod Small War was himself, the medicine hole.

Chapter 4: Moonwalk - This chapter takes place in the year 1969 during the Apollo 11 Moon landing. Margaret Many Wounds was diagnosed with diabetes three years prior and her health has dwindled drastically. Evie and Lydia are by their mother's side in her final moments making sure she is comfortable for passing. Margaret Many Wounds requests waštunkala, Sioux corn soup, which the daughters are more than willing to make even though it is a lengthy process to make. While coping with her mortality, Margaret Many Wounds commands her daughters to not let Father Zimmer near her, because she believed that he just wanted “to have the last word of my body and go fishing for my soul.” Even though Margaret Many Wounds was previously a devout follower of Father Zimmer, she became reluctant when she recovered her old faith. Evie agreed to her mother's command, and then switched thoughts to her husband, Philbert's whereabouts. Following Evie's thought, Philbert walked into Margaret Many Wounds's house and began a conversation with the three women about the Moon landing. Evie thinks to herself that she really does not love Philbert, but, because he was a champion bull rider like her father, she married him. It is also revealed that Evie is jealous of Lydia's beauty. Evie and Philbert decided to stay at Margaret Many Wounds's cabin for the night. Margaret Many Wounds could not sleep because she noticed ‘dark figures’ at the foot of her bed. She began to recall the story of her two lovers, Charles Bad Holy Macleod and Dr. Sei-ichi Sakuma. Margaret Many Wounds was with Charles Bad Holy Macleod for two years before his death and did not get pregnant with him. After his death, Margaret Many Wounds began working at the Bismarck camp, a prisoner of war camp, which Dr. Sakuma volunteered to work at as well. Margaret Many Wounds became pregnant with Evie and Lydia by Dr. Sakuma, and decided to lie about the father to her tribe because she did not want to be known for sleeping with the enemy. This story was never told to Evie and she became infuriated because her mother lied to her about her father and she looked up to this fictional father of hers. Margaret Many Wounds died before the waštunkala was finished, and was reunited with her first love Charles Bad Holy Macleod. Margaret Many Wounds's funeral service followed suit and her casket was surrounded by her loved ones. The chapter ends with Margaret Many Wounds’ spirit dancing on the Moon past Neil Armstrong and Buzz Aldrin into space where she stopped dancing and proceeded to step off “beyond the edge of the universe.”

Chapter 5: Morse Code - This chapter takes place in 1964. Crystal Thunder and Martin Lundstrom are both outcasts in their high school. They fall in love but keep their romance a secret from their mothers as they know they wouldn't approve. Crystal has a standoffish relationship with her mother, due to the strange magic her mother uses. Later, Martin proposes to Crystal who agrees, finding out that she is actually pregnant with his child. Crystal's mother is not happy about her daughter's choices but makes a deal with her. If she stays with her mother during the pregnancy, without seeing Martin at all until the child born, she may marry him. Crystal endures nine months of isolation with her mother. After the baby is born, Crystal's mother keeps it as part of the deal. Crystal marries Martin and leaves the reservation, telling her husband the child died in birth. They move to Chicago as Martin got a job at the Chicago Tribune as an artist. Crystal becomes lonely while her husband is at work and feels remorseful about her decision to leave home. Much to her dismay, Martin's mother Isabel moves in with them. Crystal is somewhat resentful to the woman at first, but Isabel teaches Crystal traditional wife duties and ends her feeling of loneliness.

Chapter 6: A Hole in the Sheets - Time stamped 1961, Anna Thunder is taking a bath when she is interrupted by Jeanette McVay, who is offered peaches and water while she explains the reason for her visit. Her story begins with Archeology and wanting to research the funeral and how a people deal with death on several levels. Anna's daughter Crystal returns home from school and runs upstairs to listen to Little Richard. Jeanette spends two weeks studying Anna Thunder; at the same time, Crystal becomes withdrawn from her mother. Spring arrives as Anna sits on the porch singing a Dakota song when tribal officer Calvin Wind Soldier arrives with a naked Jeanette with a towel around her and clutching her shoes. Jeanette had traveled to Herod Small War's place to sneak into a sweat with Archie Iron Necklace and Bill Good Voice Elk. They kicked her out and Herod's assistant called Calvin to take her away. Anna and Jeanette attend the carnival, see Calvin with his wife and her sister before running into Chester Brush Horns. He asks for cigarettes so Anna purchases them and then buys two tickets to ride the Ferris wheel where their car becomes stuck at the top. Chester entertains Anna at her request through acrobatics in the car. When Anna awakes the next morning, Chester gathers his clothing and leaves the house smoke-filled with Jeanette making breakfast. Anna tells Jeanette that she has a plan to correct a past wrong and falls asleep on the floor. She dreams of telling Calvin that they are to be together when Herod appears and tells her of an enchanted belt, which will not let her pass. Frustrated, Anna returns to her body from her dream and wakes up to discover Crystal was holding her and had thought she died. After hearing of Albert Elk Nation's death, Anna sabotages Calvin's relationship with his wife by threading pieces of Calvin's bed in Evelyn's, Calvin's wife's sister, and vice versa. The relationship was destroyed when Jeannette brings news of Evelyn's pregnancy even though her boyfriend had been kicked out. Anna becomes angry because Jeanette doesn't believe that Anna could be responsible for this event. Jeanette leaves the next day to head into town through Herod Small War, who drove her. However, after leaving Anna places a curse upon Jeannette that she would never be able to leave the reservation even though she wants to.

Chapter 7: Honor Song – This chapter follows Lydia Wind Soldier in 1964. The early parts of the chapter detail Lydia's relationship with her older twin sister, Evelyn. It quickly becomes apparent that Lydia and Evelyn have contrasting personalities. On her way home during a blizzard, Lydia almost runs over a freezing Calvin Wind Soldier. After stopping, Lydia puts him into her car, drives him home, and spends the night with him, which is uncharacteristic of her. Upon returning home. Lydia's mother thought nothing of her daughter's night with Calvin, but it would later be revealed that they became engaged. Calvin shares his Korean War stories with Lydia, as well as his relation to Red Dress early in their marriage. While Lydia was sick, Anna Thunder visits Calvin and curses him, which leads to him having an affair with Lydia's sister, Evelyn, which results in Evelyn giving birth to Calvin's Child. Lydia and Calvin decide to raise the child as their own, but this takes a mental toll on Lydia, leading to her breakdown which causes Calvin and the baby, Duane, to go for a drive. During this drive Calvin and Duane are involved in a crash caused by Henry Burger, resulting in their deaths. After this incident, Lydia stops speaking.

Chapter 8: Red Moccasins – Time-stamped 1935

Chapter 9: Snakes – Time-stamped 1864

Chapter 10: Swallowing the Birds – Time-stamped 1981

Chapter 11: The Vision Pit – The last chapter takes place in 1982. After Charlene leaves Mercury to live with her parents in Chicago, the people of reservation still do not trust Mercury. Near the end of the book, Harley fails to recognize the importance of his mother's traditional dancing dress that she has been working on for years, finds Harley drunk at a powwow, and slaps him. Herod Small War plans a vision pit experience to help Harley heal. While there, Harley is visited by his grandmother, Margaret Many Wounds, his father, Calvin Wind Soldier, and his brother, Duane Wind Soldier. Additionally, Red Dress and Ghost Horse appear and share an important message with Harley about the grass dance, tradition, and his identity. As he leaves the vision pit, he finally understands who he is.

== Characters ==
Calvin Wind Soldier: Husband of Lydia Wind Soldier and father to Duane and Harley Wind Soldier. Calvin has an extramarital affair with Lydia's twin sister Evelyn Many Wounds, producing Duane. Calvin and Duane are killed in a drunk driving incident by Henry Burger while Lydia is pregnant with Harley.

Lydia Wind Soldier: Wife of Calvin Wind Soldier and mother of Harley Wind Soldier. After her husband Calvin and nephew Duane are killed in a drunk driving incident, she refused to speak again. Lydia only communicates through gestures and occasionally song. In her mind, Lydia refers to herself as "Ini Naon Win," or Silent Woman.

Duane Wind Soldier: Son of Calvin Wind Soldier and Evelyn Many Wounds. Duane is the result of Calvin Wind Soldier's extra-marital affair with Evelyn Many Wounds. Duane was raised until his death by his father, and his aunt, Lydia Wind Soldier. Duane was killed in the same drunk driving incident that killed his father.

Chuck Norris: A Pomeranian dog that belongs to Harley Wind Soldier. Chuck Norris attends events with Harley, and expresses his opinion by barking at people, or peeing on their personal belongings.

Harley Wind Soldier: Son of Lydia and Calvin Wind Soldier. He was born about one month after his father Calvin and his half brother Duane are killed in a drunk driving incident. Harley is an excellent grass dancer, and competes in pow wows.

Red Dress (Esther): The name meaning beloved of snakes, Red Dress is Anna's grandmother's sister(great aunt). The sister of Long Chase, Red Dress was shot and killed by Reverend Pyke. After her death, her spirit is courted and married by Ghost Horse.

Margaret Many Wounds: The mother of Lydia and Evie, grandmother of Harley Wind Soldier. Confesses on her death bed the true identity of her daughter's father, a doctor she had met during the war.

Evelyn (Evie) Many Wounds: Daughter of Margaret Many Wounds, twin sister of Lydia Wind Soldier. Married to Philbert, a retired bull rider. Mother to Duane, who was the result of an affair with Lydia's husband, Calvin Wind Soldier.

Anna/Mercury Thunder: Is the mother of Crystal, the grandmother of Charlene. Anna changed her name to Mercury after reading about the element from the periodic table that Charlene had brought home. Mercury states "I'm all of a piece". She uses dark magic to control men.

Chaske: Anna's four-year-old son. His father was never known, but he got sick and died.

Charlene Thunder: Romantically interested in Harley Wind Soldier. She is the daughter of Crystal and Martin, but lives with her Grandmother Anna Thunder due to issues with her mother. She loves to dance but is never a Grass Dancer.

Crystal Lundstrom née Thunder: Daughter of Mercury and Mother to Charlene. Married to Martin Lundstrom. Crystal left the reservation with Martin. Crystal is forced to give up Charlene shortly after giving birth.

Martin Lundstrom: Husband of Crystal Thunder and father of Charlene Thunder. Martin is not Native. Instead, he is of Scandinavian descent. He is also crippled. After graduating high school, he asked Crystal to marry him. Together, they started a new life in Chicago.

Isabel Lundstrom: Mother to Martin Lundstrom. She is of Scandinavian descent. Although her relationship with Crystal starts off rocky, she takes on a role as a much-needed mother figure for her daughter in law. She can seem critical at times but she is only trying to help.

Spotted Dog: Originally Sunka Gleska, goes by Spotted Dog, belongs to the siblings Red Dress and Long Chase. First appears in Chapter 9 Snakes. Described as a clever companion, has a pumpkin color, wiry fur and white speckles on his muzzle as main features. Understands Dakota and English commands proving his wit. An energetic character, Spotted Dog is up for adventure and pretends to lead the way during a journey with Red Dress and Long Chase, but is dependent and loyal to both. His devotion to Red Dress is shown as his prognostication of her innermost thoughts do not pass him by as he comforts her with companionship. His bond with Long Chase is that of two best friends who love one another's company and are two spirits that will forever be linked.

Long Chase (Joseph): The younger sibling of Red Dress, Long Chase is a sixteen-year-old warrior who at a young age has already participated in war parties and also taken down buffalo bulls. He first appears in Chapter 9 Snakes. He is infused in the novel when he is determined to join his sister's adventure. Throughout his journey, his friendship with his assumed best friend, Spotted Dog, is shown as the two share a unique partnership. His innocent boyish nature is shown throughout his appearance in the novel, but still possesses a warrior's mentality that is not explored much in the story.

Reverend Pyke: Within the Red Dress chapter entitled Snakes, Reverend Pyke is idealistic religious presence within Fort Laramie who delivers passionate sermons that sometimes depart from direct scripture. He wears a stinking top hat that he is never seen without, un-scrubbed clothes, and has dirt-rimmed nails and a beard. Pyke's study, however, is very clean and tidy, and he becomes impassioned, lecturing on religion and also personal matters within his study. Red Dress (Esther) is his secretary for all intents and purposes, but later Pyke becomes suspicious of her when the soldiers begin to be found dead. Pyke confronts Red Dress, attempts to shoot her, but shoots Spotted Dog who jumps in the way. On the second shot, his bullet finds its mark. When Reverend Pyke flees from the tent, Dress Dress, now a spirit, follows him and causes him to shoot himself.

Fanny Brindle: Within the Red Dress chapter entitled Snakes, Fanny Brindle is a widow and somewhat of an outsider within the Fort Laramie community. A very thin, blonde, white woman, who has been thrust into poverty after the death of her husband, Fanny displays behavior that suggests she is desperate to escape her circumstances. Fanny stands out by always sitting alone in church and displaying some pop of color to brighten her dark mourning clothes. She befriends Red Dress (Esther), and convinces Red Dress to help her put on a Shakespearean play (Macbeth) to distract the members of the Fort. Later, Red Dress goes to visit Fanny in the hallway that she has had to make her home after becoming a widow, and finds Fanny in bed with her striker (the man whose residence the hallway is a part of) who is named Bailey Roe.

Pumpkin: A young woman travelling to various mid-western pow wows to perform her grass dancing. She is noted as the first female grass dancer the other characters had ever seen. Her graceful dancing is described as mesmerizing in her unique dancing outfit. She and Harley Wind Soldier become infatuated with each other and romantically involved until she dies shortly after their meeting in a car crash.

The White Ghost: A ghost that haunts an abandoned home, twelve miles outside the town. She is the ghost of a white settler, named Clara Miller, who once lived in the home. When she was alive, Herod Small War had worked for her, helping her around her home. This resulted in him having an affair with her, even though he was married. It is not mentioned how she died but her spirit continues to haunt her dilapidated home, making various, meaningful appearances to specific characters throughout the book.

Jeanette McVay: A white woman living on the reservation, dating one of the Indian men. She is a school teacher to most of the younger characters in the book. She often tries to appear Indian by dying her hair black. The Dakota culture fascinates her and she tries hard to fit in and appeal to them traditionally. Later on, she has a child, half native and half white.

Herod Small War: Frank Pipe's grandfather and a fatherlike figure to Harley Wind Soldier. He is a Yuwipi man, a spiritual person who works with spirits through the old Indian ceremony of "the sweat". He often helps the people on the reservation with supernatural things, such as protecting them from harmful spirits and helping them make decisions by speaking to the spirits for guidance. He strongly believes in the old ways of his people and tries to follow them closely.

Frank Pipe: The best friend of Harley Wind Soldier and grandson of Herod Small War. He follows Harley around on many of his adventures and tries to guide him. His grandfather is teaching him the Yuwipi ways to which Frank tries his best to follow.

Henry: Lloyd's best friend who refuses to co-sign on Lloyd's quick money scheme to revive Buffalo Bill's Wild West Show. Lloyd reminds Henry Burger of his wife's unfaithfulness, which results in Henry Burger getting drunk and in crashing his truck, kills Calvin and Duane Wind Soldier.

Lloyd: best friends with Henry Burger. Lloyd presents Henry with a get-rich-quick scheme that Henry Burger refuses to participate in. This frustrates Lloyd, which results in him teasing Henry Burger. This leads to the eventual deaths of Calvin and Duane Wind Soldier.

Archie Iron Necklace: good friends with Herod Small War and is infatuated with his wife, Alberta. Upon learning that Herod cheated on Alberta, Archie beats up Herod.

Dina: also known as Bernadine Blue Kettle is the 13-year-old niece of Anna Thunder. Dina takes her dancing seriously, which leads to her death when Anna tells her to dance in order to try out new moccasins after Chaske's death and never tells Dina to stop. She is found the next day in the snow frozen to a young Hackberry tree and was buried with her cousin Chaske in a joint funeral.

Joyce Blue Kettle: Dina's mother and Anna Thunder's cousin. She is jealous and controlling and loses her mind after the deaths of Chaske and Dina.

Ghost Horse: Uncle of Harley, brother of his great great grandfather. Dakota warrior and Heyo’ka, one of the old time clowns, who marries the spirit of Red Dress after her death. Ghost Horse dies in battle and leaves behind Red Dress’ spirit and later appears to Harley when learning how to pray.

== Themes and symbolism ==
=== Relationships ===
Susan Power uses the aspect of relationships as a sub-primary theme throughout The Grass Dancer. Harley and Pumpkin's relationship in the beginning of the story brings out the jealousy of Charlene Thunder. Crystal Thunder's (daughter to Charlene Thunder) love for a non-native Indian, Martin Lundstrom. Mercury Thunder uses her “bad magic” out of revenge against Calvin Wind Soldier because he is wearing a belt that repels her spells to make him fall in love with her. Instead, Mercury Thunder casts a spell that makes him have an affair with his wife's sister, Evelyn. Power uses the idea of marriage as an end result throughout the book. Lydia Wind Soldier marries Calvin Wind soldier after two months of dating. Power continues the struggle of power in relationships between “love, revenge, and jealousy.”

=== Non-Indian ideology ===
Power deals with the theme of non-Indian ideals throughout The Grass Dancer. Whether or not this is because she was not raised on the reservation is unknown, but there are many elements that point towards the theme of leaving the reservation and issues that are non-native Indians. Jeannette McVay coerces her students to share their real cultural stories with the class. Power flirts with the notion of non-native Indian relationships with white partners throughout the story. Jeanette McVay and her husband have a baby that doesn't look white at all and Herod has an affair with a white woman named Clara Miller. Crystal Thunder (daughter of Anna/Mercury Thunder) also falls in-love with a white boy named Martin Lundstrom. Power also deals with the notion of the end result of leaving the reservation. Charlene Thunder (1981) leaves the reservation after she tries to work some love magic to get Harley to fall in-love with her. She ends up leaving the reservation to go to Chicago to find her parents.

=== Ghost story ===
Throughout the novel the reader is presented with two legends of two fabled spirits, Red Dress and Ghost Horse. Red Dress became a spirit according to the legend to protect her descendants and was projected to be the start of the magical medicine of the Thunder family. While ghost horse is a warrior who chose to become a heyoka, or sacred clown, after his love Red Dress died. His spirit was said to guard over her body for one year. The legend states that both spirits are constantly seeking one another in the generations that follow. However, towards the end of the novel, it becomes clear that Red Dress is the only supernatural force influencing the novel, since Ghost Horse has left the earth in spirit form after he died on the battlefield. Yet the legend does hold truth, since Charlene Thunder constantly seeks out the love of Henry both of which are descendants of Red Dress and Ghost Horse.

=== Overcoming adversity ===
Within the novel Charlene Thunder is faced with the problem of overcoming adversity imposed by the family tradition of magical medicine. Charlene's connection to Red Dress is through her grandmother, who refuses to allow Charlene to act on what she believes in and instead wants Charlene to follow in her footsteps of being the tribe's witch. The connection to witchcraft ultimately creates more problems for Charlene of which she has no control, although the community recognized her lineage of holding great power ultimately she is shunned by association. Ultimately Charlene is faced with either becoming the witch that her family has destined her to be, or overcoming all adversity and living her life free and how she wants. Charlene chooses to be free and live her life away from the imposed tradition of her family's magical ties.

=== Magical realism ===
Magical realism is found throughout Susan Power's novel The Grass Dancer. Magical realism blends the natural with the supernatural. Magical realism in The Grass Dancer makes its appearance during certain rituals performed by the Dakota tribe, such as when Frank Pipe retells the story of when someone was killing reservation dogs and shooting coyotes. The tribe decided to perform a Yuwipi ceremony in order to discover who the killer was. During the ceremony, coyote spirits appeared and exposed the killer by carrying off one of the tribe members through the window of the gymnasium. The tribe members later found his body abandoned at Angry Butte with bite marks on his body. The coyotes not only identified the criminal, but they also sought justice.

According to Roland Walter who wrote “Pan-American (Re)Visions: Magical Realism and Amerindian Cultures in Susan Power's The Grass Dancer, Gioconda Belli' s La Mujer Habitada, Linda Hogan's Power, and Mario Vargas Llosa's El Hablador,” “Magical realism realizes the hybridization of the natural and the supernatural by focusing on specific histori- cal moments in order to problematize present-day disjunctive reali- ties” (Walter 66). When Margaret Many Wounds passes away in 1969, Harley Wind Soldier witnesses through a television screen his grandmother's spirit dancing on the moon while Neil Armstrong and Edwin Aldrin first set foot on its surface. Margaret Many Wounds’ spirit calls out to her grandson, “Look at me, look at the magic. There is still magic in the world” (Power 121).

Susan Power herself does not classify The Grass Dancer as a piece of magical realism. From her Voices from the Gaps interview with Shari Oslos, Power states in regard to her work: "I really feel that given the culture I was raised in, this is not magical realism, this is actual reality to me. It might not be another culture's reality but it is not a literary strategy for me. I'm really writing character's reality. It never offends me when critics characterize it that way because I understand where that's coming from. It's their cultural interpretation. But I think it's a mislabeling so whenever I get the chance to talk about it I always mention that."

=== Traditions ===
The Grass Dancer often describes a Yuwipi ceremony where tribe members gather together to call on the spirits for answers. An example of this ceremony happens in chapter 3 when Archie Iron Necklace has a dream about a medicine hole. During the Yuwipi ceremony, the spirits of Sioux ancestors guide the tribe members on a vision where Archie Iron Necklace, Herod Small War, Frank Pipe, and Harley Wind Soldier appear as young Sioux Indians riding their horses on the plain in the year 1877. On this day, one year after the Custer battle, four young warriors were trapped in the valley by white soldiers out for revenge. They prevented the warriors from escaping the valley, forcing their horses to die of starvation. When the soldiers discovered the corpses of the horses, the young warriors seemed to have vanished. The Yuwipi vision revealed how the four warriors managed to escape. The earth opened a hole and the four men were able to escape. (Power 85).

== Background ==
The Grass Dancer was written in two and a half years, with half of the book written in the last eight weeks of the deadline. The chapter titled "Medicine Hole" is inspired by a real life experience involving Power at the age of fourteen years old and her mother and two aunts, searching for a medicine hole in North Dakota. In an interview with Shari Oslos from Voices from the Gaps, author Susan Power discusses her take on the critics reaction to The Grass Dancer. She reminds her readers that the culture told in the plot is her reality. A lot of people who have read the novel has been said to be drawn to her "magical realism." But in fact, Power ensures that this was not her literary strategy. In an interview with Emerson College, Susan Power talks about her early ambitions to become a writer. "I've been writing all my life, even before I could read I filled pages with the letters I knew from the Alphabet song, and would seek out my parents, hold up the nonsense paper and declare, "This is what I wrote!," then I would tell them whatever story I concocted on the fly."

== Critical reception ==
The novel received the 1995 Hemingway Foundation/PEN Award. Terri Windling selected it as one of the best fantasy books of 1994, as well as the best fantasy first novel, describing it as "a fine work of American magical realism . . . a richly mythical novel.".

== Audiobook ==
The author Susan Power herself narrates the audiobook for The Grass Dancer.
