= Montana 1948 =

1993 novella by Larry Watson

- First edition
- Author: Larry Watson
- Language: English
- Genre: Western novel
- Publisher: Milkweed Editions
- Publication date: 1993
- Publication place: United States
- Media type: Print (Paperback)
- Pages: 169
- ISBN: 1-57131-061-4
- OCLC: 148649293
- Followed by: Justice

Montana 1948 is a 1993 novella by Larry Watson. The novella focuses on the life of young Montanan David Hayden, his family and the fictional town of Bentrock, Montana, and focuses on the struggles of a family torn between loyalty and justice. It was awarded the Milkweed National Fiction Prize.

== Plot ==
When Marie is found dead after making significant recovery before, Frank convinces the family that the cause of death was pneumonia. When David admits to seeing his uncle leave the residence hours before his babysitter's death, Wesley later confronts Frank about his actions at a family dinner at their parents' house and they reach a compromise, where Wes agrees to forget the whole incident. David, who was playing with his grandfather's pistol, once contemplates shooting Frank because of all the troubles he has given their family. Eventually, David decides to tell his parents Frank leaving their house time Marie died, implying that Frank was involved in the actions.

Wesley arrests Frank, who admits to killing Marie and molesting Native American women and arrests him in the basement, in order to avoid the embarrassment Frank would experience by going to the local jail. Wesley and Frank's father Julian are opposed to Frank's arrest and sends men to break Frank free at the house when Wesley is not there. Gail tries to scare them away by firing shotgun shots into the air. Gail later pleads for Wes to stop the nonsense and take Frank out the home so everything would stop. Wesley's moral values override his family loyalty and he agrees to take his brother to the local jail the next day. The sound of jars breaking in the basement, so the family wakes up. In the morning, Wesley finds that Frank killed himself by slitting his wrists with the broken glass.

After that, David and his family moves out of Bentrock, ending the fight between Wes and his dad.
