= Colleen Farrington =

American model, playmate, singer (1936–2015)

Playboy centerfold appearance
- October 1957
- Preceded by: Jacquelyn Prescott
- Succeeded by: Marlene Callahan

Personal details
- Born: Colleen Leigh Violet Farrington; August 5, 1936 Lordsburg, New Mexico, U.S.
- Died: October 12, 2015 (aged 79) Jupiter, Florida, U.S.
- Height: 5 ft 8 in (1.73 m)

Colleen Leigh Violet Farrington (August 5, 1936 – October 12, 2015) was an American model, Playboy Playmate, and nightclub singer. She was the mother of actress Diane Lane.

== Early life ==
Farrington was born in Lordsburg, New Mexico, the daughter of Leo White Farrington and Eleanor Biggs (later, Eleanor Scott).

== Career ==
She started work as a fashion model in New York City and was a particular favorite of fashion designer Oleg Cassini. She also had some acting roles. She was Playboy magazine's Playmate of the Month for its October 1957 issue. Her pictorial was photographed by Peter Basch.

== Personal life ==
Farrington married acting coach Burton Eugene Lane, and divorced him in 1965, shortly after their daughter, Diane Lane, was born, who went on to become an Academy Award–nominated actress. She later settled in Georgia and married Lawrence Price.

Farrington died in Jupiter, Florida, on October 12, 2015, at the age of 79.

| June Blair | Sally Todd | Saundra Edwards | Gloria Windsor | Dawn Richard | Carrie Radison |
| Jean Jani | Dolores Donlon | Jacquelyn Prescott | Colleen Farrington | Marlene Callahan | Linda Vargas |
