= I'll Be Right There =

- Theatrical release poster
- Directed by: Brendan Walsh
- Written by: Jim Beggarly
- Produced by: Bradley Ross; Peter Block; Cory Neal; Ross Meyerson; Brendan Walsh; Samantha Cocozza
- Starring: Edie Falco; Jeannie Berlin; Charlie Tahan; Kayli Carter; Michael Rapaport; Michael Beach; Sepideh Moafi; Bradley Whitford
- Cinematography: Aaron Medick
- Edited by: Aron Paul Orton
- Music by: James Righton
- Production companies: Open Swim; A Bigger Boat
- Distributed by: Brainstorm Media
- Release dates: October 7, 2023 (Hamptons); September 6, 2024 (United States)
- Running time: 98 minutes
- Country: United States
- Language: English

I'll Be Right There is a 2023 American independent comedy film written by Jim Beggarly, directed by Brendan Walsh and starring Edie Falco. It was filmed in Pearl River, New York.

== Cast ==
- Edie Falco as Wanda
- Jeannie Berlin as Grace
- Charlie Tahan as Mark
- Kayli Carter as Sarah
- Michael Rapaport as Marshall
- Michael Beach as Albert
- Sepideh Moafi as Sophie
- Bradley Whitford as Henry

== Production ==
In December 2022, it was announced that filming wrapped in New York.

== Release ==
The film premiered at the Hamptons International Film Festival on October 7, 2023. It also premiered that same month at the Newport Beach Film Festival. The film is scheduled to be released in select theaters on September 6, 2024.

== Reception ==
On the review aggregator website Rotten Tomatoes, 84% of 25 critics' reviews are positive, with an average rating of 6.8/10. Metacritic, which uses a weighted average, assigned the film a score of 66 out of 100, based on 5 critics, indicating "generally favorable" reviews.
