= High Plains Book Awards =

Literary award

- Awards horizontal logo
- Awarded for: English literary works which examine and reflect life in the High Plains region
- Country: United States; Canada
- Presented by: Billings Public Library, Billings, Montana, United States
- Eligibility: Living authors publishing a new work who reside in or write about the region
- Reward: Thirteen US$500 rewards
- Established: 2006; 20 years ago
- First award: 2007; 19 years ago
- Website: highplainsbookawards.org

The High Plains Book Awards are North American literary awards for literature about the High Plains region of the United States and Canada.

== Description ==
The awards go to books that highlight the experience and landscape of the High Plains region of the US and Canada. Books are eligible for nomination if the book is newly published that year and the authors are living and publishing in or about the region. Billings Public Library presents and administers the awards.

The awards defines the High Plains region as the states of Montana, North Dakota, South Dakota, Wyoming, Nebraska, Colorado, and Kansas, and the Canadian Provinces of Alberta, Manitoba, and Saskatchewan.

Each nominated book is reviewed by four community members. The top reviewed books are evaluated by literary professionals with knowledge of the region.

Thirteen categories have one winner each. The 2021 winners received US$500 and a commemorative plaque, for a total of US$6,500 in prize money. Winners are announced at a banquet in the Yellowstone Art Museum.

== History ==
In 2006 the Billings, Montana Billings Public Library Board of Trustees established the High Plains Book Awards. Board Chair Lloyd Mickelson led the effort to recognize works that were evocative of the High Plains landscape.

The first awards were in 2007. Parmly Billings Library administered and hosted the awards. The first awards ceremony was at Parmly as a kick off event to the fifth annual High Plains BookFest in October 2007. The original categories were Emeritus Award for best body of work by an author or team of authors, Best Book Award for fiction, non-fiction, or poetry published the previous year, and Best First Book Award for a work published in the previous year by a first-time author. Larry Watson received the inaugural Emeritus Award for his body of work in 2007.

During the sixth High Plains Book Awards in 2013, 60% of nominated works were by women, the first instance where more women's works were nominated than men's. 164 books published in 2012 were nominated in 9 categories: best fiction, nonfiction, poetry, first book, woman writer, art and photography, short stories, culinary, and young adult.

The 2017 awards debuted the Native American Author category, sponsored by Montana State University Billings Library.

The awards became a tax exempt organization in September 2017.

In 2019, The Billings Gazette reported that one-third of nominations were from Canadian authors.

== Archives ==
Historical materials related to the awards are available at the Montana Historical Society Library & Archive in their vertical files.

== See also ==
- Montana Book Award
