= Nellie Two Bears Gates =

Native American bead artist

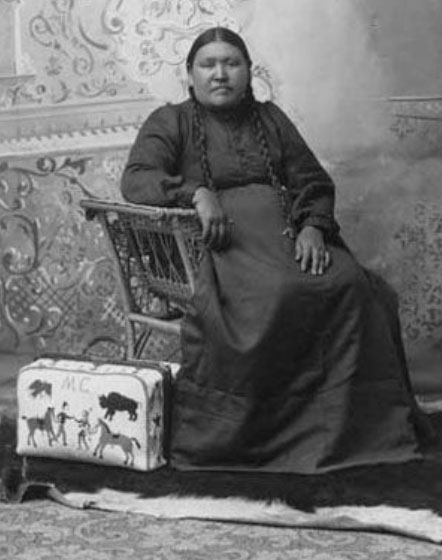
Nellie Two Bears Gates

Nellie Two Bears Gates (Note: Dakota: Maȟpíya Boǧáŋwiŋ) (c. 1854 – 1935) was a Native American artist whose beadwork depicted Yanktonai Dakota history and culture. Beaded suitcases and valises that she gave as gifts are now part of art collections and exhibitions.

== Early life ==
Nellie Two Bears Gates was born in 1854 on the traditional land of the Yanktonai Iháŋktȟuŋwaŋna Dakota which lay between the Missouri and James River in what is now North and South Dakota. Her Dakota name was Mahpiya Bogawin, meaning "Gathering of Stormclouds Woman". She was the eldest child of Chief Two Bears (d. 1878 or 1879) and his fourth wife, Honkakagewin.

At the age of seven, Nellie was taken from her family and placed in a Catholic boarding school at St. Joseph, Missouri where she stayed for eleven years. At school Nellie excelled academically and became fluent in English and French. In 1863 when she was nine and still at boarding school, her family's village was attacked and destroyed at the Battle of Whitestone Hill. Her father Chief Two Bears was one of the signers of the Treaty of Fort Laramie (1868) and settled at Standing Rock Reservation. At 18 Nellie returned to live with her family at Standing Rock after which she exclusively spoke the Dakota language.

== Family ==
Nellie married Frank Gates (b. 1853) in 1878. Together, they had seven children: Frank (b. 1878), Mary Ann (b. 1884, married J. A. Archambault 1907), Mollie (b. 1885), Josephine (b. January 24, 1888), Catherine (b. 1889), John (b. 1891), and Annie (b. unknown).

In 1946, her daughter, Josephine Gates Kelly, became the first woman in the United States to be elected chair of a tribal council. Kelly was the tribal chair of Standing Rock Reservation from 1946 to 1951. Kelly may also be the first female delegate to a Republican National Convention. Her great-granddaughter is author Mona Susan Power.

== Artwork and exhibitions ==
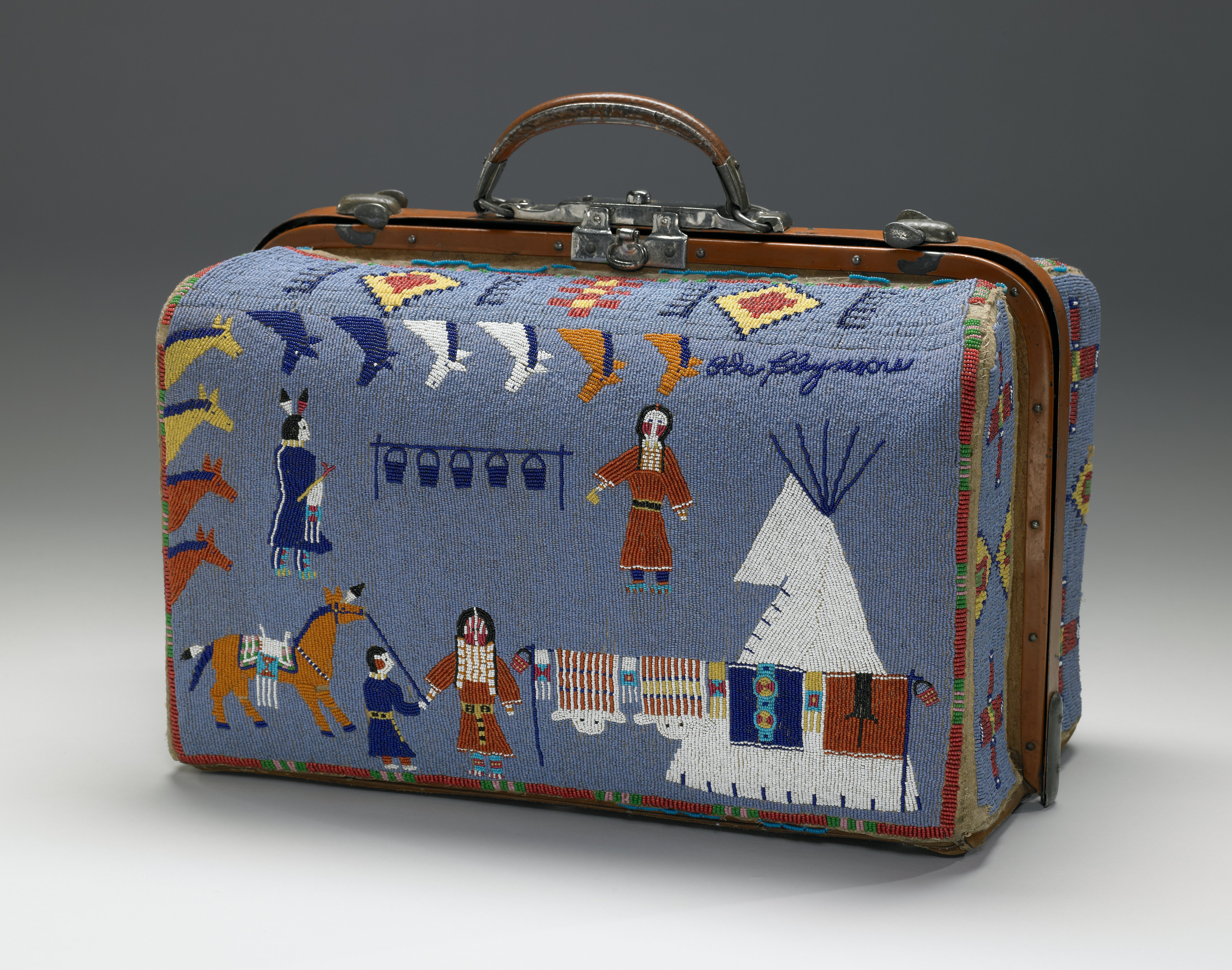
Suitcase (1880–1910)

Suitcase (1880–1910) is housed at the Minneapolis Institute of Art. It depicts a wedding scene and was a gift for Gates' relative, Ida Claymore, in honor of her marriage.

Pictorial Valise (c. 1903), is part of the Hirschfield Family Collection and was displayed as part of the Artists of the Earth and Sky exhibit at the Metropolitan Museum of Art. It was created as a gift for her daughter Josephine at the time of her graduation from the Carlisle Indian School in Pennsylvania, and depicts Chief Two Bears' actions in the Battle of Whitestone Hill in 1863.

Beaded Valise (c. 1907) is a traveling case showing pictographic designs of mounted warriors. It was a gift for her son-in-law, J. A. Archambault, as a wedding present. It has been exhibited at the Smithsonian Institution, the Wheelwright Museum of the American Indian, and the Eiteljorg Museum.

She was also featured in a group exhibit, Hearts of our People: Native Women Artists, at the Minneapolis Institute of Arts in 2019.
