= Child Bride of Short Creek =

1981 television film

- DVD cover
- Genre: Drama
- Written by: Joyce Eliason
- Story by: Michael Fessier Jr.
- Directed by: Robert Lewis
- Starring: Christopher Atkins; Diane Lane; Conrad Bain; Helen Hunt
- Theme music composer: John Cacavas
- Country of origin: United States
- Original language: English

Production
- Producers: Paul Monash; Lawrence Schiller
- Production locations: Rockville, Utah; Grafton, Utah
- Cinematography: Gary Graver
- Editors: John J. Dumas; Michael Economou
- Running time: 120 minutes
- Production company: Schiller-Monash Productions

Original release
- Network: NBC
- Release: December 7, 1981

Child Bride of Short Creek is a 1981 American made-for-television drama film written by Joyce Eliason, starring Christopher Atkins, Diane Lane, Conrad Bain, Helen Hunt and Dee Wallace. The film is a dramatization loosely based upon the 1953 Short Creek raid that had occurred in Colorado City, Arizona, and Hildale, Utah, United States, collectively known as "Short Creek," a community of members of the Fundamentalist Church of Jesus Christ of Latter Day Saints, a group that practices child marriage and polygamy.

== Plot ==
In 1953 Arizona, teenagers Jessica Rae "Jessie" Jacobs (Diane Lane) and her friend Naomi (Helen Hunt) have grown up in Short Creek as members of an isolated patriarchal polygamist religious community, led by President Frank King (Conrad Bain). The members of the small group dress in old-fashioned clothing and spend many hours a day doing domestic and agricultural chores with traditional equipment and few modern conveniences. The women are trained to serve and be subservient to their husbands. They rarely travel away from the community and are usually kept away from outside influences such as magazines and radio. Jessie's father Jay Jacobs has three wives, including Jessie's mother Mary, who only sees her husband on certain days when he is not with his other wives, and has mixed feelings about the arrangement. State authorities are also investigating the group due to its unlawful customs of polygamy and child marriage of young girls to older men.

President King's 19-year-old son Isaac (Christopher Atkins) returns home safely from serving in the Korean War, having gained knowledge of the outside world through his travels. At his homecoming party, he and Jessie become attracted to each other, and over time they fall in love. To his father's chagrin, Isaac begins to reject the group's lifestyle, including the polygamy which allows the older men of the group to regularly take new young women as wives. Isaac further questions the group's beliefs when his younger sisters accidentally drown because they were not allowed to learn how to swim. Meanwhile, President King has confided to the men of the group that God has told him to take Jessie as his wife, in addition to the three wives he already has. Despite Jessie's youth, her father Jay accepts this as God's will.

Jessie's friend Naomi attempts to run away from Short Creek, planning to go to Las Vegas and become an actress. She naively accepts a ride from two young men who get her to drink alcohol for the first time and then try to rape her. She is rescued just in time by President King and driven back to Short Creek, where she is immediately married off to an old man to settle her down.

Isaac learns that his father is planning to marry Jessie and is furious, not only because of his own feelings for Jessie but because an additional wife will cause his mother to be further neglected by his father. President King also tells Jessie of his plan to marry her. A reluctant Jessie goes along with his plan because she wants to please her parents and do the will of God, but she is very unhappy.

Jessie and Isaac secretly confess their love for each other and plan to run away together. However, after going a short distance they see many armed police preparing to launch a raid on the group. Fearing for the lives of her mother and family, Jessie decides she must go back to warn them, and says an emotional goodbye to Isaac, who boards a bus alone as Jessie rushes back to warn the community just ahead of the police. The police arrive and separate the families, sending the women and children to barracks where they will be re-educated in a modern lifestyle, while the men are sent to jail.

Two years later, Jessie and her mother Mary, along with the other community women, are being transferred once again from one barracks to another and are in line to board the bus when Jessie sees Isaac, who has just arrived in a car. Mary, seeing that Isaac and Jessie still love each other, tells her daughter to "run, while you still have a chance". Jessie hugs Mary goodbye, and goes to join Isaac; they drive away together.

== Cast ==
- Christopher Atkins: Isaac King
- Diane Lane: Jessica Jacobs
- Conrad Bain: Frank King
- Helen Hunt: Naomi
- Kiel Martin : Bob Kalish
- Dee Wallace: Mary Jacobs
- Julianne Slocum: Jacobs Daughter
- Jake Johnston: Garth Jacobs
- Karyn Christensen: Ada King
- Sharyn Christensen: Alma King

== Production ==
Parts of the film were shot in Grafton, Rockville Road, and Rockville Bridge in Utah.
