= Mona Susan Power =

Native American author (born 1961)

- Born: Susan Power; 1961 (age 64–65); Chicago, Illinois, United States
- Education: Harvard University (BA), Harvard Law School (JD), Iowa Writer's Workshop (MFA)
- Occupation: Author
- Relatives: Susan Kelly Power (mother)
- Writing career
- Pen name: Mona Susan Power
- Language: English
- Notable work: The Grass Dancer
- Notable awards: PEN/Hemingway Award (1995); US Artists Fellowship
- Website: monasusanpower.com

Mona Susan Power (Standing Rock Dakota, born 1961) is a Native American author based in Saint Paul, Minnesota. Her debut novel, The Grass Dancer (1994), received the 1995 PEN/Hemingway Award for Debut Novel.

== Early life ==
Power was born in Chicago, Illinois, and is a Yantonai Dakota enrolled citizen of the Standing Rock Sioux Tribe of North & South Dakota. Her mother, Susan Kelly Power, Gathering of Stormclouds Woman (Standing Rock Dakota, 1925–2022), was an activist who helped found the American Indian Center of Chicago. Mona's grandmother, Josephine Gates Kelly, was three-term tribal chairperson for the Stand Rock Sioux Tribe. Mona's great-grandmother was bead artist Nellie Two Bear Gates. She is a descendant of Sioux Chief Mato Nupa (Two Bears).

Power's father, Carleton Gilmore Power, a European-American from New England, worked in publishing as a salesman. One of his great-great-grandfathers was Governor of New Hampshire.

== Education ==
Power earned her bachelor's degree from Harvard University and a JD from Harvard Law School.

In 1992 she received an MFA from the Iowa Writers' Workshop.

== Career ==
Power's 1994 debut novel, The Grass Dancer, follows four generations of Native Americans, with the plot stretching from 1864 to 1986. She released the collection Roofwalker in 2002 and the novel Sacred Wilderness in 2014. Power's novel A Council of Dolls was released in 2023. The novel was longlisted for the National Book Award for Fiction.

Her short fiction has been published in The Atlantic, The Paris Review, Voice Literary Supplement, Ploughshares, Story, and The Best American Short Stories 1993.

She is a professor emeritus at Hamline University in Saint Paul, Minnesota.

== Honors and awards ==
The Grass Dancer won the 1995 PEN/Hemingway Award for Debut Novel.

Powers won a United States Artists Fellowship in 2006.

In 2024, A Council of Dolls won a Minnesota Book Award in the Novel & Short Story category.

== Bibliography ==
=== Books ===
- The Grass Dancer, G. P. Putnam's Sons, 1994.
- Strong Heart Society, Penguin Books, 1998.
- Roofwalker, Milkweed Editions, 2002.
- Sacred Wilderness, Michigan State University Press, 2014.
- A Council of Dolls, Mariner Books, 2023.

=== Short stories ===
- “Dead Owls” in Never Whistle at Night: An Indigenous Dark Fiction Anthology (2023)
