= Let Him Go =

2020 film by Thomas Bezucha

- Theatrical release poster
- Directed by: Thomas Bezucha
- Written by: Thomas Bezucha
- Based on: Let Him Go by Larry Watson
- Produced by: Paula Mazur; Mitchell Kaplan; Thomas Bezucha
- Starring: Diane Lane; Kevin Costner; Lesley Manville; Kayli Carter; Will Brittain; Jeffrey Donovan
- Cinematography: Guy Godfree
- Edited by: Jeffrey Ford; Meg Reticker
- Music by: Michael Giacchino
- Production company: The Mazur Kaplan Company
- Distributed by: Focus Features (United States); Universal Pictures (International)
- Release date: November 6, 2020
- Running time: 114 minutes
- Country: United States
- Language: English
- Budget: $21 million
- Box office: $11.4 million

Let Him Go is a 2020 American neo-Western thriller film starring Diane Lane and Kevin Costner, and directed, written, and co-produced by Thomas Bezucha, based on the 2013 novel of the same name by Larry Watson. It also stars Lesley Manville, Kayli Carter, Will Brittain, and Jeffrey Donovan.

The film follows a retired sheriff (Costner) and his wife (Lane) who try to rescue their grandson from a dangerous family living off-the-grid.

Let Him Go was theatrically released in the United States on November 6, 2020, by Focus Features. The film received positive reviews and grossed over $11.4 million.

== Plot ==
In 1961 Montana, retired sheriff George Blackledge lives on a ranch with his wife Margaret, their son James, James's wife Lorna and infant son Jimmy. One afternoon, Margaret sees James's horse return without him. George finds James's body by a creek; he had fallen off his horse and broken his neck.

In 1963, Lorna marries her new boyfriend, Donnie Weboy; she is not in love with him but needs his support with Jimmy. One afternoon, while out shopping, Margaret sees Lorna, Donnie and Jimmy getting ice cream. When Jimmy drops his, Donnie forcefully grabs Jimmy's arm. When Lorna steps in, Donnie strikes her. Margaret later goes to their house to check in on them, but a neighbor reveals that they have left town to move to his family. Margaret packs her bags, planning to rescue Jimmy. George reluctantly joins her. But they only know Donnie is from North Dakota.

George and Margaret speak to a sheriff who mentions a lead in Forsyth, a shop owner related to the Weboys. He tells them to look in Gladstone, North Dakota. George discovers that Margaret brought his revolver with them. Outside of Gladstone, they come across Peter Dragswolf, a young Native-American, who lives with a horse in a hut. He provides them with food and warmth for the evening, and suggests that they look for Bill Weboy, Donnie's uncle who is rude and cocky.

The following morning, George and Margaret meet Bill. He speaks to Donnie's mother Blanche, who says that she wants to meet the Blackledges. At her house - faraway from the city, she initially appears pleasant. However, when Lorna and Jimmy arrive, she starts to make rude comments toward the Blackledges and speaks sternly toward Lorna and sends Jimmy to bed.

The next day, George and Margaret visit Lorna at work in a shop and meet at a diner for lunch. They plead with her to return home to Montana with Jimmy, but Lorna is worried what Donnie will do if she tries to leave. However, she is convinced to sneak out later while the Weboys are asleep.

That night, Blanche, Donnie and Bill, along with Blanche's two other sons Marvin and Elton, break into the Blackledges' motel room. When Margaret tells Blanche that Donnie struck Lorna and Jimmy, she asks Donnie if it is true, then slaps him and then Margaret to ask how hard he hit Lorna. She then orders him to hit Margaret, which he does. When Bill tries to take advantage of Margaret, George grabs his gun and points it at them.

The men overpower George, then Blanche orders Donnie to chop off George's right hand's fingers with a hatchet, which he does. When they leave, they advise them to return home to avoid an "accident" happening to Jimmy. Margaret takes George to the hospital. An officer later tells them that he spoke to the Weboys, who insist George attacked first, as he and Margaret planned to abduct Jimmy. The officer says that Jimmy is a Weboy now and suggests they leave town.

George and Margaret start heading back to Montana, but when he is too weak to keep going, they stop by Peter's again to rest. Margaret asks George if they can move out there to be near Jimmy. He, however, wants to give up. Margaret breaks down, devastated that they have lost both James and Jimmy.

During the night, George sneaks out, returning by car to the Weboys'. Finding a shotgun on the back porch, he checks and replaces the shells in the gun. George sets a fire outside as a distraction, reaches Donnie and Lorna's room, and forces Donnie down at gunpoint while Lorna leaves with Jimmy.

Meanwhile, Margaret, upon finding George gone, rushes with Peter on horseback to find him. George knocks Donnie unconscious when he tries to alert the others. Blanche wakes as he fights Bill, and Lorna tumbles down the stairs. Blanche aims her pistol at George as he gets Jimmy back but she accidentally shoots Bill dead. He then throws Jimmy over the balcony to Lorna, who catches him as Blanche shoots him in the chest.

As Marvin and Elton run upstairs, George fights Blanche for the gun and eventually causes her to shoot both of them. Margaret and Peter find Lorna and Jimmy outside. Margaret rushes in to try and get George out, but Blanche corners them and shoots George again, this time killing him. Margaret then grabs the shotgun and kills Blanche.

Peter gets Margaret out as the Weboy house goes up in flames with George's corpse inside. They later part ways, as she drives home with Lorna and Jimmy.

== Cast ==
- Diane Lane as Margaret Blackledge
- Kevin Costner as George Blackledge
- Kayli Carter as Lorna Blackledge
- Ryan Bruce as James Blackledge
- Otto and Bram Hornung as Jimmy Blackledge
- Lesley Manville as Blanche Weboy
- Will Brittain as Donnie Weboy
- Jeffrey Donovan as Bill Weboy
- Will Hochman as Tucker
- Connor Mackay as Elton Weboy
- Adam Stafford as Marvin Weboy
- Booboo Stewart as Peter Dragswolf
- Greg Lawson as Gladstone Sheriff
- Bradley Stryker as Sheriff Nevelson

== Production ==
=== Casting ===
The film was announced in February 2019, with Thomas Bezucha directing his screenplay based on Larry Watson's novel, and Kevin Costner and Diane Lane attached to star. Bezucha would also produce the film with Paula Mazur and Mitchell Kaplan.

=== Filming ===
Filming began in April 2019 in Calgary, with Lesley Manville, Will Brittain, Jeffrey Donovan and Kayli Carter added to the cast. Actor Booboo Stewart was added in May. Filming lasted through May 17.

== Release ==
=== Theatrical ===
The film was released by Focus Features on November 6, 2020. It was previously scheduled to be released on August 21, 2020, but was delayed due to the COVID-19 pandemic. The studio spent an estimated $8 million promoting the film.

=== Home media ===
Let Him Go was released on digital download on February 2, 2021, and on Blu-ray and DVD by Universal Pictures Home Entertainment on February 9, 2021, in the United States. It was then released on Blu-ray and DVD on April 26, 2021, by Warner Bros. Home Entertainment in the United Kingdom. It began streaming on HBO and HBO Max on July 3, 2021. A 4K Ultra HD edition from Universal was released on August 20, 2024.

== Reception ==
=== Box office ===
Let Him Go grossed $9.4 million in the United States and Canada, and $2 million in other territories, for a worldwide total of $11.4 million.

The film made $1.5 million from 2,454 theaters on its first day, including $150,000 from Thursday night previews. It went on to debut to $4 million, becoming the second straight Focus Features film to top the box office after Come Play had the week prior. The audience was 66% over the age of 35, with 52% being female. The film made $1.8 million in its second weekend, finishing second behind newcomer Freaky, then $710,000 in its third.

In its fourth weekend of release the film made $453,000 from 1,447 theaters (and $670,000 over the five-day Thanksgiving frame). The film became available via VOD on the same weekend, and was the top-rented film on FandangoNow and Apple TV, and sixth on Google Play. The following weekend the film made $208,610, and finished first on Spectrum, second on FandangoNow, and ninth on Google Play.

=== Critical response ===
On review aggregator website Rotten Tomatoes, the film holds an approval rating of 84% based on 192 reviews, with an average rating of 7/10. The site's critics consensus reads: "Let Him Go's uneven blend of adult drama and revenge thriller is smoothed over by strong work from a solid veteran cast." On Metacritic, the film has a weighted average score of 63 out of 100 based on 36 critics, indicating "generally favorable" reviews. Audiences polled by CinemaScore gave the film an average grade of "B−" on an A+ to F scale, while PostTrak reported 82% of audience members gave the film a positive score, with 50% saying they would definitely recommend it.

Owen Gleiberman of Variety praised Costner and Lane's performances, saying they "give it their all in a genre film that fuses suspense with honest emotion." Writing for The Globe and Mail, Barry Hertz gave the film 3 out of 4 stars, saying: "A skilfully executed thriller that is narrowly aimed at one demographic – audiences over 50 who like a little violence with their late-life dramas – but succeeds at entertaining just about anyone who comes across its dusty, blood-soaked path."
