= Diane Lane =

American actress (born 1965)

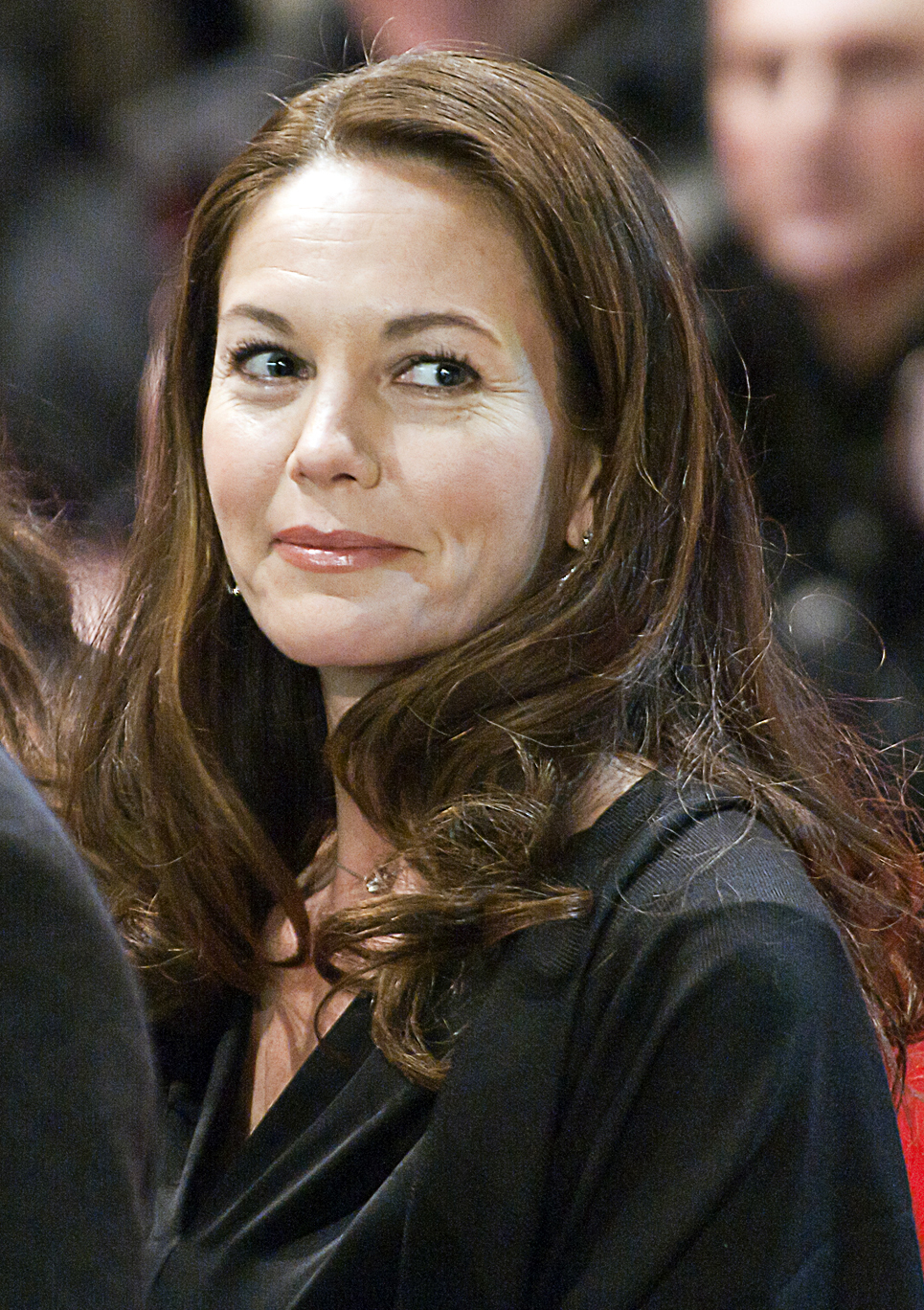
- Lane in 2011
- Born: January 22, 1965 (age 61); New York City, U.S.
- Occupation: Actress
- Years active: 1971–present
- Works: Full list
- Spouses: Christopher Lambert (m. 1988; div. 1994) Josh Brolin (m. 2004; div. 2013)
- Children: 1
- Mother: Colleen Farrington
- Awards: Full list

Diane Lane (born January 22, 1965) is an American actress. Lane started her career as a child actor before establishing herself as a leading actor in film. She has starred in numerous leading lady and key supporting roles in a huge variety of films ranging from major film studio blockbuster productions to smaller independent film features. Her accolades include a New York Film Critics Circle Award, an ICON Award from the Newport Beach Film Festival, as well as nominations for one Academy Award, three Primetime Emmy Awards, three Golden Globe Awards, several Screen Actors Guild Awards, and several Satellite Awards.

Lane started acting professionally on stage in 1971 (at the age of six) and made her film debut opposite Sir Laurence Olivier in A Little Romance (1979). Lane starred in various film roles in the 1980s, including The Outsiders (1983) and Streets of Fire (1984). After taking a brief break from acting, Lane participated in some independent films before being cast in the Western miniseries Lonesome Dove (1989), receiving a Primetime Emmy Award nomination for her role.

Lane continued to star in films throughout the 1990s, ending the decade with a nomination for the Independent Spirit Award for Best Female Lead for A Walk on the Moon (1999). In 2002, Lane received a nomination for the Academy Award for Best Actress for the Adrian Lyne-directed film Unfaithful (2002). Lane earned further acclaim for her Golden Globe-nominated roles in the romantic comedy-drama Under the Tuscan Sun (2003) and the HBO film Cinema Verite (2011).

Lane has played various recurring roles throughout her career. Starting with Man of Steel (2013), Lane has portrayed Martha Kent, the adoptive mother of Superman, in a total of four films in the DC Extended Universe. She also voiced the role of Riley's mom in the animated Pixar films Inside Out (2015) and Inside Out 2 (2024).

Lane's later roles have included leads in two thriller films: Let Him Go (2020), a top box office hit during the COVID pandemic, and Anniversary (2025), for which she received a nomination for a Satellite Award for Best Lead Actress. She also received a Primetime Emmy nomination for her starring role in the Ryan Murphy television series Feud: Capote vs. The Swans (2024).

Lane has starred in three films each with Richard Gere and Matt Dillon and four films with Kevin Costner. She has also appeared in four films directed by Francis Ford Coppola — The Outsiders (1983); Rumble Fish (1983); The Cotton Club (1984); and Jack (1996) — and one film directed by his late wife Eleanor Coppola: Paris Can Wait (2016).

== Early life ==
Lane was born on January 22, 1965, in New York City. Her mother, Colleen Leigh Farrington, was a nightclub singer and Playboy centerfold (Miss October 1957), who was also known as Colleen Price. Her father, Burton Eugene Lane, was a Manhattan drama coach, who ran an acting workshop with John Cassavetes, worked as a cab driver, and later taught humanities at City College.

In 1968, when she was just three years old, her parents separated. Lane's mother went to Mexico and obtained a divorce, while retaining custody of Lane until she was six years old. After Lane's mother moved to Georgia, Lane's father gained custody of her. She and her father lived in a number of residential hotels in New York City; she often rode with him in his taxi.

In 1980, when Lane was 15, she declared her independence from her father and flew to Los Angeles for a week with actor and friend Christopher Atkins, with whom she starred the following year in the film Child Bride of Short Creek (1981). Lane later remarked: "It was reckless behavior that comes from having too much independence too young." She returned to New York and moved in with a friend's family, paying them rent.

In 1981, Lane enrolled in high school after taking correspondence courses. However, Lane's mother kidnapped her and took her back to Georgia. Lane and her father challenged her mother in court, and six weeks later, she was back in New York. Lane did not speak to her mother for the next three years, but they eventually reconciled.

== Career ==
=== 1971–1977: Career beginnings in the theater ===
Lane's grandmother, Eleanor (née Biggs) Farrington Scott, was a Pentecostal preacher of the Apostolic denomination, and Lane was influenced theatrically by the demonstrative quality of her grandmother's sermons.

In 1971, at age six, Lane began acting professionally, landing her first acting role in the La Mama Experimental Theatre Company production of Medea (1971), in which she played Medea's daughter. From then until 1976, she performed with La MaMa, E.T.C. in New York and toured with them abroad. Some of the plays she performed in include The Trojan Women, Electra, Bertolt Brecht's The Good Woman of Szechuan, Federico García Lorca's Blood Wedding, Paul Foster's The Silver Queen, and Shakespeare's As You Like It. Most of these plays were directed or adapted by Andrei Șerban and Elizabeth Swados.

In 1977, when Lane was 12 years old, she had a role in Joseph Papp's production of The Cherry Orchard with Meryl Streep and Irene Worth. At this time, Lane was enrolled in an accelerated program at Hunter College High School, but her grades suffered due to her busy schedule.

From 1976 to 1977, Lane appeared in The Cherry Orchard and Agamemnon at New York's Vivian Beaumont Theater. She also participated in the first production of Runaways when it was off-Broadway.

=== 1979–1999: Film career beginnings and breakthrough ===
When Lane was 13, she turned down a role in Runaways on Broadway to make her feature-film debut opposite Laurence Olivier in A Little Romance. Lane won high praise from Olivier, who declared her "the new Grace Kelly". At the same time, Lane was featured on the cover of Time, which declared her one of Hollywood's "Whiz Kids".

In the early 1980s, Lane made a successful transition from an inexperienced to a frequently-booked actress. She appeared as the teenage lead in the tear-jerker Touched by Love (1980) and as the young female outlaw Little Britches in the Lamont Johnson film Cattle Annie and Little Britches (1981) (with Amanda Plummer in her own debut role as Cattle Annie). In 1982, Lane starred opposite Kenny Rogers in Six Pack and as the leader of a punk rock band in the cult classic film, Ladies and Gentlemen, The Fabulous Stains. The film also starred Laura Dern, punk musicians Steve Jones and Paul Cook of the Sex Pistols, and Paul Simonon from the Clash.

Lane's breakout performances came with back-to-back adaptations of novels by S. E. Hinton, adapted and directed by Francis Ford Coppola: The Outsiders and Rumble Fish, both in 1983. Both films featured memorable performances from a number of young male actors who later became leading men in the next decade (as well as members of the so-called "Brat Pack"), including Tom Cruise, Matt Dillon, Emilio Estevez, Leif Garrett, C. Thomas Howell, Rob Lowe, Ralph Macchio, Patrick Swayze, Mickey Rourke, and Nicolas Cage. Lane's distinction among these heavily male casts advanced her career while affiliating her with young male actors. Andy Warhol proclaimed her "the undisputed female lead of Hollywood's new rat pack".

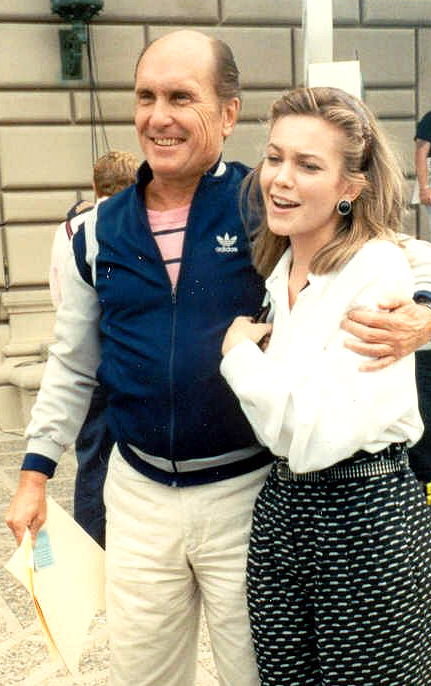
Diane Lane (age 24) with Robert Duvall (age 58) at the 41st Emmy Awards (1989)

In 1984, Lane starred in two films that were commercial and critical failures: Streets of Fire (she turned down Splash and Risky Business for this film) and The Cotton Club. Lane's career languished as a result. After The Cotton Club, Lane dropped out of the movie business and lived with her mother in Georgia, stating: "I hadn't been close to my mom for a long time, so we had a lot of homework to do. We had to repair our relationship because I wanted my mother back."

A few years later, Lane returned to acting with appearances in The Big Town (1987) and Lady Beware (1987). However, she did not make another big impression on a sizable audience until the popular and critically acclaimed TV miniseries Lonesome Dove (1989), for which she received an Emmy Award nomination.

In 1989, having taken a decade-long hiatus from the theater to build her film career, Lane returned to the stage to play Olivia in Twelfth Night at the American Repertory Theater in Cambridge, Massachusetts.

Lane came very close to being cast as Vivian Ward in the blockbuster hit Pretty Woman (1990), which had a much darker script at the time, but due to scheduling conflicts, she was unable to take the role. Apparently, costume fittings were made for Lane before the role fell to Julia Roberts.

Lane was given positive reviews for her performance in the independent film My New Gun (1992), which was well received at the Cannes Film Festival. She went on to appear as actress Paulette Goddard in Sir Richard Attenborough's big-budget biopic of Charles Chaplin, Chaplin (1992).

Over the next seven years, Lane would star in ten movies, notably Judge Dredd (1995) and Jack (1996). Lane earned further recognition for her role in the film A Walk on the Moon (1999), which also starred Liev Schreiber, Viggo Mortensen, and Anna Paquin. One reviewer wrote: "Lane, after years in post-young-career limbo, is meltingly effective." The film's director, Tony Goldwyn, described Lane as having "this potentially volcanic sexuality that is in no way self-conscious or opportunistic". Lane's performance earned her an Independent Spirit Award nomination for Best Female Lead. At this time, she was interested in making a film about actress Jean Seberg in which she would play Seberg.

=== 2000–2011: Unfaithful and further acclaim ===
Lane opened the decade with supporting roles as Mark Wahlberg's love interest in The Perfect Storm (2000) and Frankie Muniz's talkative mother in My Dog Skip (2000).

Lane then starred in two films that were released just 3 days after the September 11, 2001 terror attacks on New York and Washington, D.C.: the psychological thriller The Glass House and the baseball movie Hardball. Hardball debuted at number one and The Glass House debuted at number two at the US box office.

Lane then starred in Unfaithful (2002), an erotic thriller directed by Adrian Lyne and adapted from the French film The Unfaithful Wife. Lane played a housewife (opposite Richard Gere) who indulges in an affair with a younger, French book dealer played by Olivier Martinez. The film featured several sex scenes, and Lane's repeated takes for these scenes were very demanding for the actors involved, especially for Lane, who had to be emotionally and physically fit for the duration. While reflecting on the film's legacy, Lane has commented that she still deals with chronic neck pain.

Although Unfaithful received mixed reviews, Lane herself earned high praise for her performance, winning both the Best Actress Award at the National Society of Film Critics and the New York Film Critics Circle. Lane also received nominations for the Academy Award for Best Actress, the Critics' Choice Movie Award for Best Actress, the Golden Globe Award for Best Actress in a Motion Picture – Drama, and the Screen Actors Guild Award for Outstanding Performance by a Female Actor in a Leading Role. Entertainment Weekly critic Owen Gleiberman extolled her work: "Lane, in the most urgent performance of her career, is a revelation. The play of lust, romance, degradation, and guilt on her face is the film's real story."

Following Unfaithful, Lane starred in Under the Tuscan Sun (2003), a romantic comedy-drama based on the best-selling book by Frances Mayes, for which she earned a nomination for the Golden Globe Award for Best Actress – Motion Picture Comedy or Musical. This was followed by lead roles in Fierce People (2005), Must Love Dogs (2005), Hollywoodland (2006), and Untraceable (2008).

In addition to leading the cast of Untraceable, Lane appeared in three more films in 2008: Jumper, Killshot (which was given a limited theatrical release before being released on DVD in 2009), and Nights in Rodanthe (based on the novel of the same title by Nicholas Sparks). The latter film marked Lane's third collaboration with Richard Gere. While promoting the film, Lane expressed frustration with being typecast: "I am gunning for something that's not so sympathetic. I need to be a bitch, and I need to be in a comedy. I've decided. No more Miss Nice Guy." Lane had even contemplated quitting acting and spending more time with her family if she would be unable to get these kinds of roles. She continued: "I can't do anything official. My agents won't let me. Between you and me, I don't have anything else coming out..."

Despite these concerns with being typecast, Lane signed on to Secretariat (2010), a Disney film about the relationship between the 1973 Triple Crown-winning racehorse and his owner, Penny Chenery, whom Lane portrayed.

Lane then starred in Cinema Verite (2011), an HBO movie about the making of the first reality television show, An American Family (1973). Lane earned Emmy, Screen Actors Guild, Satellite, and Golden Globe award nominations for her portrayal of the reality family's matriarch, Pat Loud.

The following year, Lane was featured in the PBS documentary Half the Sky: Turning Oppression into Opportunity for Women Worldwide (2012), which was produced by Show of Force along with Fugitive Films, showcasing women and girls living under very difficult circumstances and bravely fighting to challenge them.

=== 2013–present: Return to theater and television ===
At the end of 2012, and before her divorce from Josh Brolin in early 2013, Lane returned to her theater roots, headlining a production of the David Cromer-directed Sweet Bird of Youth (by Tennessee Williams) at the Goodman Theatre in Chicago. Lane played Princess Kosmonopolis, a fading Hollywood movie star, opposite Finn Wittrock, who portrayed Chance, her attractive gigolo. This was the first time she had done a stage play since 1989, when she played Olivia in William Shakespeare's Twelfth Night at the American Repertory Theater in Cambridge, Massachusetts.

Following the success of Cinema Verite, Lane starred in Zack Snyder's Superman film Man of Steel (2013), playing Martha Kent. Snyder said of her casting: "We are thrilled to have Diane in the role because she can convey the wisdom and the wonder of a woman whose son has powers beyond her imagination." Lane reprised the role in Batman v Superman: Dawn of Justice (2016),Justice League (2017), and Zack Snyder's Justice League (2021).

Shortly after the release of Man of Steel, Lane was tapped to play Hillary Clinton in an NBC miniseries, Hillary, which was supposed to "start with the Monica Lewinsky morning-after... And then continue on until she was embarking on her [2008] presidential bid." Intense media backlash ultimately caused NBC to cancel the series.

Lane returned to theater again in 2015, starring with Tony Shalhoub and Mamoudou Athie in the off-Broadway original production of Bathsheba Doran's The Mystery of Love and Sex. In 2016, nearly four decades after she first appeared on Broadway, Lane starred in a play in which she had previously performed: Chekhov's The Cherry Orchard (1977), alongside Joel Grey and Harold Perrineau. While Lane played a child peasant (with no lines) in Broadway's 1977 run of the play, this time she played the lead role of Madame Lyubov Andreyevna Ranevskaya.

In 2015, Lane appeared in the drama Every Secret Thing alongside Dakota Fanning and Elizabeth Banks, had a voice role in the Pixar-animated feature Inside Out, and co-starred opposite Bryan Cranston and Helen Mirren in the biopic Trumbo, which received a Screen Actors Guild nomination for Best Ensemble Cast.

Besides Justice League, Lane appeared in two other films in 2017: Eleanor Coppola's Paris Can Wait and Mark Felt: The Man Who Brought Down the White House. That year, it was also announced that Lane was set to star in an untitled, Reed Morano-directed film with Jeff Bridges (whom she previously worked with in Wild Bill), though the film never materialized.

Lane marked her return to television in 2018 with two projects being released in the same week: the Amazon miniseries The Romanoffs and the final season of the Netflix hit series House of Cards. At the time, these roles were considered "rare TV appearance[s] for Lane, who has primarily worked in film throughout her career." However, Lane has continued to appear in various television series, including leading the cast of the FX series Y: The Last Man (based on the post-apocalyptic science fiction comic book series of the same name) in 2021 and appearing in the Apple TV series Extrapolations in 2023.

In between the aforementioned television work, Lane starred in Serenity (2019) and the western thriller Let Him Go (2020). The latter film marks her fourth collaboration with Kevin Costner and topped the US box office during the COVID pandemic.

In 2024, Lane received a Primetime Emmy nomination for her portrayal of Slim Keith in Ryan Murphy's Feud: Capote vs. The Swans on FX. She also played the female lead in the Netflix show A Man in Full (alongside Jeff Daniels, Lucy Liu, and Tom Pelphrey) and reprised her voice role as Riley's mother in Inside Out 2, which has become the most successful animated film in history.

In October 2025, Lane was awarded an ICON Award at the Newport Beach Film Festival. The award preceded the release of Anniversary (2025), a dystopian political thriller that she stars in alongside Kyle Chandler. Lane also served as one of the film's executive producers and was nominated for a Best Lead Actress Satellite Award.

Lane is involved in various forthcoming projects. She will star alongside Scarlett Johansson in the Mike Flanagan-directed movie, The Exorcist: Martyrs (2027). Other projects with as-yet determined release dates are the film Moral Capacity (co-starring Dacre Montgomery and Tim Robbins), the Hulu drama series Victoria, and the Netflix comedy series A Hundred Percent.

== Personal life ==
=== Family ===
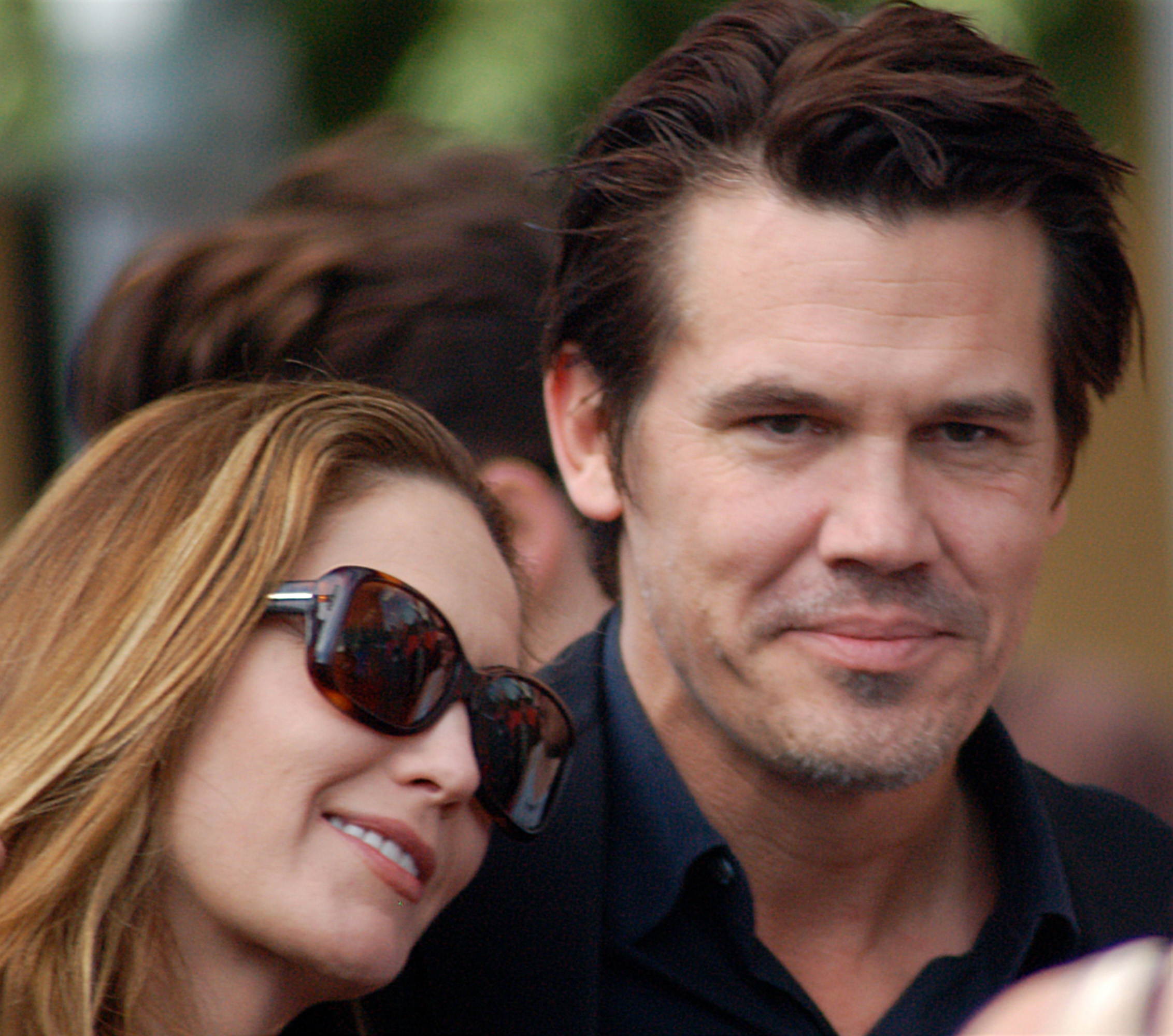
Lane (age 44) with then-husband Josh Brolin (age 41) when Mary Steenburgen received her Hollywood star (December 2009).

Lane met actor Christopher Lambert in Paris while promoting The Cotton Club in 1984. They had a brief affair and split up. They met again two years later in Rome to make a film together, entitled Priceless Beauty, and in two weeks they were a couple again. Lane and Lambert married in October 1988 in Santa Fe, New Mexico. They have a daughter. They divorced in March 1994.

Lane became engaged to actor Josh Brolin in July 2003 and they were married on August 15, 2004. On December 20 of that year, she called police after an altercation with him, and he was arrested on a misdemeanor charge of domestic battery. Lane declined to press charges and the couple's spokesperson described the incident as a "misunderstanding". Lane and Brolin filed for divorce in February 2013. Their divorce was finalized on November 27, 2013.

Lane has also dated Jon Bon Jovi, frequent costar Matt Dillon, and Timothy Hutton (and was his date to the 1981 Academy Awards where he won Best Supporting Actor for Ordinary People).

=== Charity work ===
Lane is also involved in several charities, including Heifer International, which focuses on world hunger, Artists for Peace and Justice, a Hollywood organization that supports Haiti relief, and the BrandAID Project. However, she tries not to draw attention to her humanitarian efforts: "Sometimes I give with my heart. Sometimes I give financially, but there's something about [helping others] that I think ought to be anonymous. I don't want it to be a boastful thing."

Lane was featured heavily in the documentary Half the Sky, based on the book Half the Sky: Turning Oppression into Opportunity for Women Worldwide. The documentary had Lane and several other A-list actresses/celebrities visit Africa and other areas where women are oppressed. Lane has become an ambassador for this kind of work and charity work in general.

On August 22, 2014, Lane was honored for her work with Heifer International at its third annual Beyond Hunger: A Place at the Table gala at the Montage Beverly Hills. Lane says working with Heifer International has affected her life and nurtured the relationship she has with her daughter.

== Awards and nominations ==
Four days before the New York Film Critics Circle's vote in 2002, Lane was given a career tribute by the Film Society of Lincoln Center. A day before that, Lane held a dinner for the actress at the Four Seasons Hotel. Critics and award voters were invited to both. She went on to win the National Society of Film Critics, the New York Film Critics Circle awards and was nominated for a Golden Globe and an Academy Award for Best Actress for her role in Unfaithful. In 2003, she was named ShoWest's 2003 Female Star of the Year, and was a co-recipient of the Women in Film Crystal Award honoring outstanding women in entertainment.

Lane ranked at No. 79 on VH1's 100 Greatest Kid Stars. She was ranked No. 45 on AskMen.com's Top 99 Most Desirable Women in 2005, No. 85 in 2006, and No. 98 in 2007.

=== Honors ===
- 2003: Honored as the Female Star of the Year by the ShoWest Convention.
- 2004: Received the American Riviera Award during the Santa Barbara International Film Festival.
- 2012: Received the Outstanding Achievement in Cinema Award during the Savannah Film Festival.
- 2017: Received the Career Achievement Award during the Sarasota Film Festival.
- 2025: Received the ICON Award at the Newport Beach Film Festival.

== Bibliography ==
- Ascher-Walsh, Rebecca. "Confidence: The Ultimate Seducer". Men's Health. Archived from the original on October 17, 2010.
- "Diane Lane: Her Best Roles". Empire.
- Directo, Debby (March 23, 2015). "Behind the scenes with 21-year-old Julia Roberts". CBS News.
- Hensley, Dennis (June 1, 2000). "Diane Lane: Lane Changes". Movieline. Archived from the original on December 2, 2011.
- Kaplan, Michael (April 1, 1996). "Diane Lane: A Career with a View". Movieline. Archived from the original on December 2, 2011.
- Radziwill, Carole (September 1, 2008). "Gorgeous At Any Age: Diane Lane". Glamour.
- Rebello, Stephen (October 1, 2003). "Diane Lane: Sudden Lane Changes". Movieline. Archived from the original on December 2, 2011.
- Robinson, Tasha (October 7, 2010). "Interview: Diane Lane". The Onion. The A.V. Club.
