= Susan Kelly Power =

American author and activist (1925–2022)

Susan Kelly Power (1925–2022) was an indigenous American Yanktonai Dakota activist and founding member of the American Indian Center of Chicago, Illinois.

Not to be confused with her daughter, Mona Susan Power, an American author.

== Early life ==
Susan Louise Kelly Power was born on January 22, 1925, in Fort Yates, North Dakota, on the Standing Rock Sioux Reservation.

Power was enrolled in an Indian Boarding School and later briefly sent to a Catholic boarding school within South Dakota and was then sent back to North Dakota to Bismarck Indian School. While in these schools, Susan faced physical and mental abuse from school staff. Due to unforeseen circumstances, in 1942 she arrived in Chicago to work where she eventually stayed due to financial constraints.

Susan was part of a large family, with seven siblings and parents Josephine and Colvin Kelly. Susan had close bonds with her sisters and a warm family life. Her Mother was one of her role models.

== Career ==
Power worked in a factory and edited legal publications for the University of Chicago Law School. She held positions at the Museum of Science and Industry, the Salvation Army, and the US Census Bureau. Power was active with Native groups such as the Indian Council Fire and the National Congress of American Indians, becoming was the organization's youngest member at the time of its creation in 1944.

She launched the American Indian Center of Chicago in 1953. On February 20, 2016, Power spoke at a community event at the center.

== American Indian Center ==
In a basement, Ms. Power and others helped establish what evolved into the American Indian Center of Chicago (AIC) in 1953. This center is the country's oldest urban American Indian center. This center was a place where individuals were assisted in connecting to housing and employment opportunities. It offers Native American people social services, youth and elder programs, cultural education, and gathering opportunities. The center is located at 3401 West Ainslie Street. AIC was established to assist Native families in dealing with the transition from life on the reservation to urban life as a result of this influx of reservation Indians.

=== History ===
American Indians have historically received assistance from AIC. American Indians from all over were relocated to metropolitan Chicago in the 1950s as a result of federal programs including the Indian Relocation Program.

=== Mission ===
AIC's mission is to foster relationships of understanding and communication between Indians and non-Indians residing in metro Chicago, as well as among Indian people of all Tribes. They additionally aim to aid their economic progress, support their cultural, artistic, and extracurricular endeavors, and perpetuate Indian cultural values.

== Family ==
She is survived by her daughter Mona Susan Power, stepson Douglas Power, and his wife Jeanann Glassford Power, stepdaughter Marjorie Mbilinyi, and grandchildren Douglas Drew and Alessandra Power, Nnali, Anina, and Lyungai Mbilinyi. Power was preceded in death by her husband Carleton G. Power, who died in 1973.
