= Larry Watson (writer) =

American writer

- Born: 1947 (age 78–79); Rugby, North Dakota, U.S.
- Education: Bismarck State College, University of North Dakota, University of Utah
- Occupation: Author
- Writing career
- Notable work: Montana 1948
- Notable awards: Milkweed National Fiction Prize (1993)

Larry Watson (born 1947) is an American author of novels, poetry and short stories.

== Early life ==
He was born in 1947 in Rugby, North Dakota. He grew up in Bismarck, North Dakota. He graduated from Bismarck State College, then earned both bachelor's and master's degrees at the University of North Dakota. He subsequently earned a Doctorate in creative writing from the University of Utah.

== Career ==
His short story "Where I Go, What I Do" was included in the anthology The Best American Short Stories in 1978. His first novel, In a Dark Time, was published in 1980. The book did not sell well, delaying Watson's plans for a second novel. But Montana 1948, published in 1993, was a success, winning the Milkweed National Fiction Prize that year and going on to sell more than half a million copies. The Washington Post called Montana 1948 "a significant and elegant addition to the fiction of the American West, and to contemporary American fiction in general." The book follows the story of a Montana family and involves the sexual assault and murder of a Native American woman. The book has been taught frequently in high schools, but its subject matter has been the subject of controversy. In 2020, Henry Sibley High School in Mendota Heights, Minnesota, announced that it would stop teaching the novel temporarily until fuller cultural context of the book's setting could be taught as well.

His subsequent novels include Orchard, Laura, Justice, and White Crosses. Esquire magazine called his 2011 novel American Boy one of the best books of that year.

Watson's 2013 novel 'Let Him Go', has been made into a film, directed by Thomas Bezucha, and starring Kevin Costner, Diane Lane and Lesley Manville. Filmed in Calgary in 2019, it was released by Focus Features in November 2020.

Watson taught writing and literature at the University of Wisconsin–Stevens Point for 25 years before joining the faculty at Marquette University in 2003 as a visiting professor.

== Bibliography ==
=== Novels ===
- In A Dark Time. Simon & Schuster. 1980. ISBN 9780671551643.
- Montana 1948. Milkweed Editions. 1993. ISBN 9780915943135.
- Justice. Washington Square Press. 1996. ISBN 9780671535575., collected fiction
- White Crosses. Washington Square Press. 1998. ISBN 9780671567736.
- Laura. Pocket Books. 2000. ISBN 9780671567743.
- Orchard. Random House Publishing Group. 2004. ISBN 9780375758546.
- Sundown, Yellow Moon. Random House. 2007. ISBN 9780375507229.
- American Boy. Milkweed Editions. 2011. ISBN 9781571310781.
- Let Him Go. Milkweed Editions. 2013. ISBN 9781571311023.
- As Good as Gone. Algonquin Books. 2016. ISBN 9781616205713.
- The Lives of Edie Pritchard. Algonquin Books. 2020. ISBN 9781616209025.

=== Poetry ===
- Watson, Larry (1983). Leaving Dakota. Song Press.
- Watson, Larry (2019). Late Assignments. Standing Stone Books.

== Honors ==
- Fellowships from the National Endowment for the Arts (1987, 2004)
- Grants from the Wisconsin Arts Board
- Milkweed National Fiction Prize (1993) for Montana 1948
- Friends of American Writers Award
- Mountains and Plains Independent Booksellers Association Fiction Award (1994)
- New York Public Library Fiction Award
- Wisconsin Library Association Award
- Critics’ Choice Award
- High Plains Book Awards
