= Tehching Hsieh =

Taiwanese artist (born 1950)

- Born: December 31, 1950 (age 75); Nanzhou, Pingtung, Taiwan
- Occupations: Performance artist, painter

Tehching Hsieh
- Traditional Chinese: 謝德慶
- Simplified Chinese: 谢德庆
Transcriptions
Standard Mandarin
- Hanyu Pinyin: Xiè dé qìng

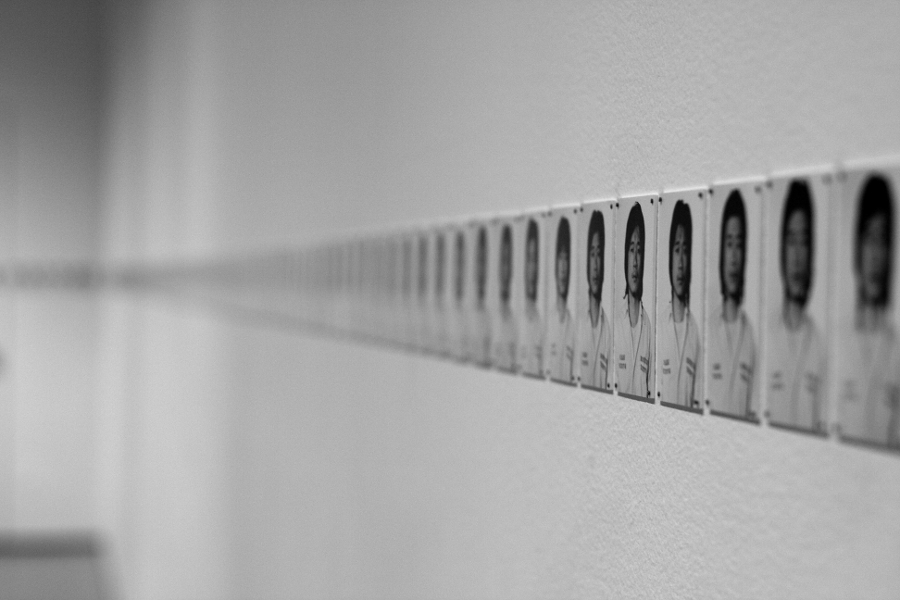
Tehching Hsieh's exhibition One Year Performance 1978–1979 at MoMA, 2009

Tehching Hsieh (Chinese: 謝德慶; born December 31, 1950), sometimes known as Sam Hsieh, is a Taiwanese-born painter and performance artist who lives in New York City. He is known for his durational art. He has been called a "master" by fellow performance artist Marina Abramović.

== Early life ==
Born in Nanzhou, Hsieh was one of 15 children from a family in southern Taiwan. He dropped out of high school and started creating paintings; he went on to create several performance pieces after finishing his three years of compulsory military service in Taiwan. In 1974, he worked as a seaman before abandoning ship at a pier on the Delaware River, near Philadelphia, and making his way to New York City, working as a dishwasher and cleaner during his first four years there.

== Career ==
Before coming to the United States, Hsieh had been a painter, producing many works until 1973.

From 1978 to 1986, Hsieh accomplished five One Year Performances while living in New York City; from 1986 to 1999, he worked on what he called his "Thirteen-Year Plan" to create work but not publicly exhibit it. In 1994, 96 of his paintings were sold at auction to a Taiwanese collector, raising about $500,000, which allowed for his purchase of buildings that he leased (including some for free to artists from 1994 onward) that financially supported his art. He was also supported financially by his mother and brother living in Taiwan. He has officially stopped making art since January 2000.

In 2008, MIT Press published Out of Now, The Lifeworks of Tehching Hsieh by Adrian Heathfield and Hsieh – a monograph with documentation, essays by academics and artists and an extended conversation. The year after its release, he told The New York Times, "Because of this book I can die tomorrow."

The next year, the Museum of Modern Art (MoMA) in New York exhibited a collection documenting his work. The exhibition, titled "Performance 1: Tehching Hsieh" and organized by Klaus Biesenbach, was the inaugural installation in a series of original performance pieces at the museum. Positively reviewed by The New York Times, the show led to a larger recognition of Hsieh's work. The Solomon R. Guggenheim Museum in New York also showed one of his works the same year as part of its retrospective exhibition, "The Third Mind: American Artists Contemplate Asia: 1860–1989."

Curated by Adrian Heathfield, Taiwan's Pavilion at the 57th Venice Biennale in 2017 featured Hsieh's work in an exhibition titled "Doing Time".

== Early works ==
=== Jump Piece ===
In 1973, Hsieh documented himself jumping out of a second-story window in Taiwan, and breaking both of his ankles on the concrete.

== Durational works ==
He is most known for six durational performance pieces completed between 1978 and 2000.

=== One Year Performance 1978–1979 (Cage Piece) ===
In this performance, which lasted from 29 September 1978 through 30 September 1979, the artist locked himself in an 11.5-by-9-by-8-foot (3.5 by 2.7 by 2.4 m) wooden cage, furnished only with a wash basin, lights, a pail, and a single bed. During the year, he did not allow himself to talk, to read, to write, or to listen to radio and TV. A lawyer, Robert Projansky, notarized the entire process and made sure the artist never left the cage during that one year. His loftmate Cheng Wei Kuong came daily to deliver food, remove the artist's waste, and take a single photograph to document the project. In addition, this performance was open to be viewed once or twice a month from 11 am to 5 pm.

=== One Year Performance 1980–1981 (Time Clock Piece) ===
For one year, from 11 April 1980 through 11 April 1981, Hsieh punched a time clock every hour on the hour. Each time he punched the clock, he took a single picture of himself, which together yield a 6-minute movie. He shaved his head before the piece, so his growing hair reflects the passage of time.

Documentation of this piece was exhibited at the Solomon R. Guggenheim Museum in 2009, using film, punch cards and photographs.

This work was the first of Hsieh's ever to be displayed in the UK at the Liverpool Biennial in 2010.

During the summer of 2017, this piece was displayed at the Tate Modern in London.

In his 2013 list of the greatest performance art works, Dale Eisinger of Complex wrote that One Year Performance 1980–1981 (Time Clock Piece) "is thought to have bridged a gap between industry and art in a way particular to the individual that Warhol's grand factory pieces couldn't achieve."

=== One Year Performance 1981–1982 (Outdoor Piece) ===
In his third one-year performance piece, from 26 September 1981 through 26 September 1982, Hsieh spent one year outside. He did not enter buildings or shelter of any sort, including cars, trains, airplanes, boats, or tents, with one exception: he was arrested and brought into the police station for a total of 15 hours. It came after he wielded nunchucks in self-defense during a street altercation. He spent the year moving around New York City with a backpack and a sleeping bag.

=== Art / Life: One Year Performance 1983–1984 (Rope Piece) ===
In this performance, Hsieh and Linda Montano spent one year between 4 July 1983 and 4 July 1984 tied to each other with an 8-foot-long (2.4 m) rope. They had to stay in the same room when inside, but were not allowed to touch each other until the end of the one-year period. Both shaved their hair in the beginning of the year, and the performance was notarized initially by Paul Grassfield and later by Pauline Oliveros. Subsequently, in a 2009 interview, Hsieh stated he was 'a little angry' with how he considered Montano to have '(taken) that piece and made it hers. Most people think that was her piece. The picture she always uses I don’t like either. She is in the foreground and I am in the background. Sometimes my name isn’t even included when documentation of the work is shown. So I am a little angry, because actually it was my idea and we decided to do it together and share the work 50/50, but now it is like she has eighty and I have twenty. She says it is the critics that make it that way. I tell her, "You know what is going on." But she doesn’t agree and there it is.'

=== One Year Performance 1985–1986 (No Art Piece) ===
For one year, Hsieh unaffiliated himself with art in any way possible: he did not create any art, did not talk about art, did not look at anything related to art, did not read any books about art, and did not enter any art museum or gallery.

=== Tehching Hsieh 1986–1999 (Thirteen Year Plan) ===
At the outset, Hsieh declared, "Will make Art during this time. Will not show it publicly." This plan began on his 36th birthday, 31 December 1986, and lasted until his 49th birthday, 31 December 1999.

At the end, on 1 January 2000 he issued his concluding report, "I kept myself alive. I passed the December 31st, 1999." The report consisted of cutout letters pasted onto a single sheet of paper.

== Philosophy ==
Hsieh's pieces are not feats of stamina nor consciously motivated by a desire to suffer (although they have been described as ordeals), but rather are explorations of time and of struggle. According to the American cultural critic Steven Shaviro, Hsieh's work can be seen as being about imprisonment, solitude, work, time, homelessness, exposure, marriage, human relations, and the way in which art and life are related. The artist himself states his work is about "wasting time and freethinking".

A little after 1999, Hsieh declared he was no longer an artist. He has, however, continued to give interviews to an art audience. He has expressed that he likes the work of Praxis.

== Influence on contemporary artists ==
In 2014, Benjamin Bennett embarked on a series of live actions broadcast by streaming on the web named Sitting and Smiling. For each section, he stares motionless in front of the camera for a period of four hours, twice a week without pause since the project started. He told Vice magazine that he was inspired by Hsieh's work.

Lisa Hsiao Chen's novel Activities of Daily Living (2022) is based on his life and work.

Lisa Ko's novel Memory Piece (2024) cites Hsieh's work as inspiration for the work of character Giselle Chin.

== Personal life ==
Hsieh lives in Clinton Hill, Brooklyn. Ai Weiwei is a former tenant and an old friend.

== See also ==
- Taiwanese art
