= Mystery Lights =

2024 short story collection

- Author: Lena Valencia
- Publisher: Tin House Books
- Publication date: August 6, 2024
- Pages: 256
- ISBN: 978-1959030621

Mystery Lights is a 2024 debut short story collection by One Story managing editor Lena Valencia. Consisting of ten stories, the book was published by Tin House Books.

== Stories ==
Title	Original publication
"Dogs"	Epiphany
"You Can Never Be Too Sure"	Joyland
"Mystery Lights"	CRAFT
"The White Place"	Ninth Letter
"Bright Lights, Big Deal"	
"Trogloxene"	Electric Literature
"The Reclamation"	Rejoinder
"Clean Hunters"	The Master's Review
"Reaper Ranch"	
"Vermilion"	BOMB

== Inspirations ==
Valencia stated that she had been inspired by David Lynch, specifically Twin Peaks, and had complicated feelings about the female revenge plot that she wanted to capture in her short stories.

== Critical reception ==
Electric Literature listed the book as one of the best short story collections of 2024.

Publishers Weekly called the short stories of "Valencia's accomplished debut collection" "alluring" and deserving of "a wide readership." Kirkus Reviews called the book a "self-assured debut collection" with "engaging" stories, ultimately lauding Valencia's grasp of horror and world-building.

Chicago Review of Books observed the consistent theme of female resilience, vulnerability, and power in Valencia's ten stories. The reviewer concluded: "The stories in Mystery Lights are little universes you want to stay inside, each full of intrigue. Valencia shows her range. She pulls you in from the first sentence, drops in clues at the right moments, and follows through on behalf of her characters."

West Trade Review observed the range and diversity of "dangers," both in reality and in more speculative worlds, which Valencia wrote into her short stories. The reviewer also lauded the theme of female resilience in Valencia's protagonists as they navigated such dangers.
