= Lisa Low =

American poet

Dr. Lisa Low
- Occupations: Poet and scholar

Academic background
- Education: Rice University (BA); Indiana University Bloomington (MFA); University of Cincinnati (PhD)

Academic work
- Discipline: English
- Sub-discipline: Creative writing
- Website: https://www.lisa-low.com/

Lisa Low is a Chinese American writer and artist. She is the author of Replica (University of Wisconsin Press, 2026) and the chapbook Crown for the Girl Inside (YesYes Books, 2023). In 2023, Low won a Pushcart Prize.

== Biography ==
Low was born and raised in Maryland. In 2009, she received her BA in English from Rice University.

Her debut poetry collection, Replica, was selected as one of Chicago Review of Books’ “Must-Read Books of March 2026.” It received a starred review from Booklist.

== Honors and awards ==
- 2020: Gulf Coast Nonfiction Prize
- 2023: Pushcart Prize
