= I Have Some Questions for You =

2023 novel by Rebecca Makkai

- Hardcover First Edition
- Author: Rebecca Makkai
- Language: English
- Subjects: Murder investigation, cold case, bias, truthiness, wrongful conviction, homicide, false confession, collective memory
- Genre: Mystery, thriller
- Publisher: Viking
- Publication date: February 21, 2023
- Publication place: United States
- Media type: Print, ebook
- Pages: 448 pp
- ISBN: 9780593490143; Hardcover First Edition
- OCLC: 1335121742
- LC Class: PS3613.A36 I33 2023 lccn.loc.gov/2022032713

I Have Some Questions for You is a 2023 literary mystery novel by American writer Rebecca Makkai, published by Viking Press. The novel received universal acclaim from critics upon release, and spent six weeks on the New York Times bestseller list.

It was popular among the general public, and placed ninth in the Goodreads Choice Award's Mystery & Thriller category. Its audiobook went on to win an inaugural Libby Book Award, and it was longlisted for prestigious prizes like the Aspen Words Literary Prize and Carol Shields Prize for Fiction.

== Plot ==
Bodie Kane, a film professor and podcaster, is forced to confront a series of violent events in her past when she is invited to teach a class at the New Hampshire boarding school she graduated from.

== Publication history ==
I Have Some Questions for You was published on February 21, 2023 by Viking Press. It spent six weeks on the New York Times Bestseller list, after having debuted at #3.

== Reception ==
=== Reviews ===
The Star Tribune and The Wall Street Journal both published positive reviews, with the former praising the novel's "nuance" and the latter positively describing the "expressive imagery" of Makkai's writing. Ron Charles, writing in The Washington Post, characterized the novel as standing apart from other "prep-school novels" by situating much of the novel's drama within the world outside the school. The Associated Press praised the novel as "a sleekly plotted literary murder mystery" but criticized the characters. Positive reviews were also published in The New York Times, The New Yorker, The Boston Globe, The Atlantic, and NPR.

Publishers Weekly praised the book and gave it a starred review, drawing a positive comparison to Makkai's previous novel, The Great Believers (2019), writing that "this is sure to be a hit." Kirkus Reviews, while positive overall, negatively compared the book to The Great Believers, noting that "this book does not have the profound impact of its predecessor." Booklist and Bookpage both published starred reviews, praising the novel's prose, Bodie's characterization, and what they felt was a subtle message about racism and misogyny.

=== Awards ===
Year	Award	Category	Result	Ref
2023	Goodreads Choice Awards	Mystery & Thriller	Nominated–9th	
2023	Heartland Booksellers Award	Fiction	Shortlisted	
2023	Libby Book Award	Audiobook	Won	
2024	Aspen Words Literary Prize	—	Longlisted	
2024	Carol Shields Prize for Fiction	—	Longlisted	
