= The Masters Review =

American literary magazine

- Founded: 2011; 15 years ago
- Founder: Kim Winternheimer
- Country of origin: United States
- Headquarters location: Portland, Oregon
- Distribution: Independent Publishers Group
- Publication types: Online, Books
- Official website: www.mastersreview.com

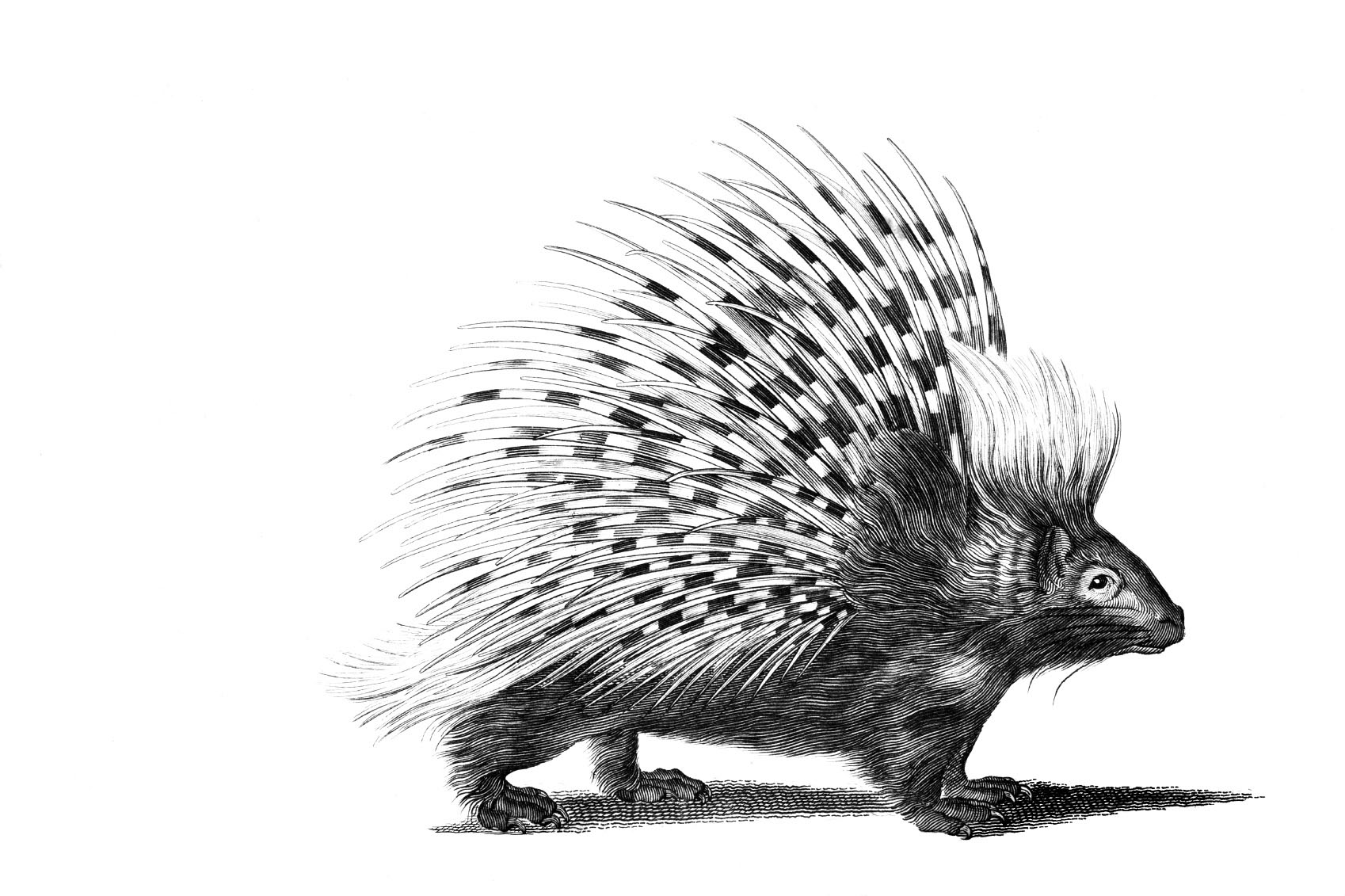
The Masters Review

The Masters Review is an American literary magazine and book publisher based in Portland, Oregon. Established in 2011 by founding editor Kim Winternheimer, the publication serves a platform for publishing and discovering new and emerging writers. Since its inception, The Masters Review has been honored by the Independent Publisher Book Awards for Best Short Story Collection by the American Library Association and Foreword Reviews, a fellowship from Oregon Literary Arts for the work it does for new writers, and has stories recognized in The Best of the Net, The Best Small Fictions, and The Million Writers Award, among others. It is distinguished from many other notable literary magazines by actively seeking work from previously unpublished writers.

Working with authors Lauren Groff, A. M. Homes, Lev Grossman, Kevin Brockmeier, Amy Hempel, and Roxane Gay, The Masters Review produces a printed volume of ten stories annually, which showcases and promotes emerging writers. It also publishes fiction and narrative nonfiction by new writers online, as well as stories and essays from guest writers, including: Kate Bernheimer, Ben Loory, Manuel Gonzales, Julia Elliott, and Ottessa Moshfegh, to name a few.

The publication hosts several contests year round, including its notable Short Story Award for New Writers, which is held twice yearly and awards cash prizes, publication, and connects writers with literary agencies looking for new talent.

== The Masters Review (Online) ==
The Masters Review publishes a great deal of its content online. Fiction, essays, interviews with important literary figures, craft essays, submission opportunities to other literary magazines and publications, book reviews by debut authors, and literary and cultural criticism are consistent features.

== A platform for emerging writers ==
The Masters Review focuses exclusively on emerging writers, which the publication defines as any writer who has not published a novel at the time of submission. They are open to writers with published story collections and writers with novels that were self-published or saw a circulation below 3000 copies, as showcased in Portland Monthly. The Masters Review accepts submissions and essays from writers around the world as long as stories are written and submitted in English.

=== Annual anthology ===
The Masters Review printed anthology serves as a major endorsement for new writers. Printed annually, a guest judge contributes an introduction and selects ten writers from a shortlist to be published in the collection. Aside from national distribution and high visibility in the printed work, the anthology is also part of an exclusive mailing to agents, with the aim of connecting new writers with representation. The Masters Review Volume III with stories selected by Lev Grossman received an INDIEFAB medal for Best Short Story Collection.

==== Writers who selected work for The Masters Review Annual Anthology ====
- Lauren Groff, The Masters Review Vol. I (2012)
- A. M. Holmes, The Masters Review Vol. II (2013)
- Lev Grossman, The Masters Review Vol. III (2014)
- Kevin Brockmeier, The Masters Review Vol. IV (2015)
- Amy Hempel, The Masters Review Vol. V (2016)
- Roxane Gay, The Masters Review Vol. VI (2017)
- Rebecca Makkai, The Masters Review Vol. VII (2018)
- Kate Bernheimer, The Masters Review Vol. VIII (2019)
- Rick Bass, The Masters Review Vol. IX (2020)

=== New Voices ===
New Voices appear online throughout the year. This category invites emerging writers to submit fiction and narrative nonfiction, selected by The Masters Review staff. New Voices stories include winners and finalists in The Best Small Fictions, The Best of the Net, and Million Writers Award, to name a few.

=== Featured Fiction ===
The Masters Review provides Featured Fiction, or stories written by established guest writers to appear online throughout the year. In this way, the publication aligns their new writers with established talent while offering free access to quality fiction and narrative nonfiction to its readership.

==== Writers who contributed work for The Masters Review Featured Fiction ====
- Manuel Gonzales, What Happened to Eloise, (2014)
- Ben Hoffman, Other Dangers, (2014)
- Kate Bernheimer, The Punk's Bride (2015)
- Ben Loory, The Candelabra (2015)
- JM Tyree and Michael McGriff, Our Secret Life in The Movies (reprint, 2015)
- Kelly Luce, Lookout (2015)
- Adrian Van Young, The Lady Winchester Deciphers Her Labyrinth (2015)
- Julia Elliott, The Restorative Unit (2015)
- Katie Chase, Creation Story (2016)
- Thomas Pierce, A Rogue Planet (2016)
- Brian Evenson, Room Tone (2016)
- Lydia Davis, The Visitor (2017)
- Jac Jemc, Hunt and Catch (2017)
- Ron Rash, Last Bridge Burned (2018)
- Chaya Bhuvaneswar, Heitor (2018)
- Kathy Fish, Praise Rain (2019)
- Adrian Van Young, Under the System (2019)
- Sherrie Flick, Woodpeckers Peck to Establish Territory in the Spring (2020)

== Staff ==
- Kim Winternheimer: Founder
- Cole Meyer: Editorial Director
- Melissa Hinshaw: Assistant Editor
- Brandon Williams: Assistant Editor
- Melissa Bean: Reader
- Abby Burns: Reader
- Jennifer Dupree: Reader
- Elena Ender: Reader
- Ross Feeler: Reader
- Kimberly Guerin: Reader
- Lauren Harkawik: Reader
- Courtney Harler: Reader
- Tom Houseman: Reader
- Benjamin Kessler: Reader
- Mariya Khan: Reader
- Abbie Lahmers: Reader
- Meghan Lane: Reader
- Melissa Madore: Reader
- Emily McLaughlin: Reader
- Aurore Munyabera: Reader
- Kathryn Ordiway: Reader
- Halley Parry: Reader
- Ben Perkins: Reader
- Fiona Robertson: Reader
- Michelle Servellon: Reader
- Nicole VanderLinden: Reader
- Hannah VanDuinen: Reader
- Kelsey Wang: Reader
- Rebecca Williamson: Reader

== Books published ==
- The Masters Review Volume I with stories selected by Lauren Groff (2012). ISBN 978-0-9853407-04
- The Masters Review Volume II with stories selected by AM Homes (2013). ISBN 978-0-9853407-11
- The Masters Review Volume III with stories selected by Lev Grossman (2014). ISBN 978-0-9853407-28
- The Masters Review Volume IV with stories selected by Kevin Brockmeier (2015). ISBN 978-0-9853407-35
- The Masters Review Volume V with stories selected by Amy Hempel (2016). ISBN 978-0-9853407-4-2
- The Masters Review Volume VI with stories selected by Roxane Gay (2017). ISBN 978-0-9853407-59
- The Masters Review Volume VII with stories selected by Rebecca Makkai (2018). ISBN 978-0-9853407-6-6
- The Masters Review Volume VIII with stories selected by Kate Bernheimer (2019). ISBN 978-0-9853407-73
- The Masters Review Volume IX with stories selected by Rick Bass (2020).

== See also ==
- List of literary magazines
