= Ravishing (novel) =

2025 novel by Eshani Surya

- Author: Eshani Surya
- Language: English
- Publisher: Grove Atlantic
- Publication date: 2025
- Publication place: United States

Ravishing is a 2025 debut novel by Eshani Surya, published by Grove Atlantic under the Roxane Gay Books imprint. The novel blends literary and speculative fiction to explore themes of beauty, identity, and chronic illness. It follows two siblings navigating the personal and ethical consequences of a biotechnology-driven beauty product.

== Plot ==
Ravishing follows Kashmira, a teenage Indian American girl who dislikes her facial features because they remind her of her abusive father. She becomes fixated on a highly sought-after cosmetic product that uses nanoparticle technology to transform users' appearances. As the product grows in popularity, users begin experiencing harmful side effects. The novel also follows her older brother, Nikhil, whose storyline intersects with the development and distribution of the product. Initially drawn to its promise, he becomes implicated as evidence emerges of its risks and ethical consequences. As Kashmira’s condition worsens, the narrative traces the personal and moral fallout of the technology, examining what individuals are willing to endure "to be the so-called best version of themselves."

== Themes ==
=== Beauty, technology, and capitalism ===
Critics describe Ravishing as a critique of the beauty and wellness industries and their entanglement with corporate power. Kirkus Reviews calls it a “speculative take” on the industry, while Publishers Weekly characterizes the novel as an “incendiary chronicle” of corporate ethics and personal desire. In an interview with The Rumpus, Surya states that the novel’s central technology was designed to explore how “the line between care and harm becomes really blurred” in profit-driven systems.

=== Identity, race, and assimilation ===
The novel engages with diasporic identity and racialized beauty standards. In Platform Magazine, Surya describes the project as asking whether there is “a perfect way to be brown in America.” Kirkus Reviews similarly highlights the novel’s focus on belonging and self-perception, particularly how external pressures shape identity.

=== Chronic illness and the body ===
Reviewers emphasize the novel’s treatment of chronic illness and embodiment. Broad Street Review notes its exploration of “chronic illness and capitalism,” while Surya, in interviews with The Rumpus and Debutiful, has linked the narrative to her own experiences with illness and the body as a site of intervention.

=== Family and trauma ===
The novel also centers on family relationships shaped by estrangement and trauma. Publishers Weekly highlights its dual narrative structure following two siblings, whose contrasting relationships to the novel’s central technology reflect broader emotional and ethical tensions. It also forces Nikhil, as an employee of Evolvoir, to question "where his loyalties lie."

== Reception ==
Kirkus Reviews stated, " [the novel] is thoughtful in its handling of tricky themes of identity, belonging, and, perhaps most compellingly, the intersection of wellness culture and chronic illness. Surya handles this latter with unflinching—even discomfiting—clarity." Publishers Weekly gave it a starred review: "Surya blends her stirring whistleblower plot with a heartrending depiction of Kashmira’s self-delusion [...]. This one hits hard." It was on Chicago Review of Books' "Best Debuts We Read in 2025" list.
