= The Edge of Water =

2025 novel by Olufunke Grace Bankole

- Author: Olufunke Grace Bankole
- Language: English
- Genre: Literary fiction
- Publisher: Tin House
- Publication date: 4 February 2025
- Pages: 272
- ISBN: 978-1-963108-05-7

The Edge of Water is a 2025 novel by Nigerian American writer, Olufunke Grace Bankole. Set between Nigeria and New Orleans, the novel follows three generations of women as prophecy, intergenerational bonds, and immigration intersect in the years surrounding Hurricane Katrina. Told largely through letters exchanged between a mother and daughter, and Ifa cowrie-shell divination, the novel explores themes of fate, immigration, motherhood, and Yoruba spirituality.

Published by Tin House in February 2025, The Edge of Water was Bankole's debut novel. Among numerous accolades, it was named one of TIME's 100 Must-Read Books of 2025, and extensively praised for its layered depiction of diasporic identity, matrilineal inheritance, intergenerational trauma, and the tensions between fate and agency.

== Background and publication ==
The Edge of Water is the debut novel of Nigerian American writer Olufunke Grace Bankole. The novel was published by Tin House on February 4, 2025 to critical acclaim.

Set between Nigeria and New Orleans, the novel follows three generations of women whose lives are shaped by cultural expectations, immigration, intergenerational bonds, and a prophecy that spans decades.

Reviewers noted the novel's skillful engagement with Yoruba cosmology, prophecy, and questions of fate and agency, as well as its nuanced depiction of the Nigerian diaspora experience in the United States.

== Plot ==
Set between Nigeria and New Orleans, The Edge of Water follows three generations of women whose lives are shaped by family bonds, immigration, and prophecy. In Ibadan, a city in southwestern Nigeria, Esther is given a foreboding prophecy, by the Yoruba priestess Iyanifa, warning her daughter, Amina, against travel to the United States. Esther allows Amina to go nonetheless, and Amina arrives in New Orleans full of hope for a new life. Years later, her daughter, Laila, grows up in New Orleans navigating the tensions between inherited traditions and American life. Much of the narrative unfolds through letters exchanged between Esther and Amina as they attempt to understand their family's past and their place within it. As Hurricane Katrina approaches the Gulf Coast, the prophecy that has shadowed the family for years begins to converge with unfolding events in New Orleans. The novel follows the women's attempts to negotiate questions of fate, individual longing, and belonging across continents and generations.

== Reception ==
The Edge of Water is the Winner of the 2026 VCU Cabell First Novelist Award, Winner of the 2025 Westport Prize For Literature, and Winner of the 2025 Ploughshares John C. Zacharis First Book Award. Among other award placements, it was Finalist for the New American Voices Award and Longlisted for the Carol Shields Prize for Fiction.

The novel was named a "Best Book of the Year" by numerous outlets, including: TIME, Apple Books, Electric Literature, Chicago Review of Books, Well-Read Black Girl, Brittle Paper, and many others.

In a starred review, Publishers Weekly described the novel as "a beautiful narrative" and praised its treatment of intergenerational trauma and resilience, noting that "Bankole fluidly alternates between Esther’s and Amina’s perspectives as each woman recounts her life story, deepening the reader’s understanding of the characters and the central events of the narrative."

Kirkus Reviews noted the novel as "[a] global, multigenerational novel suffused with heart, feeling, devastation, and hope" and commended Bankole's narration of family history, displacement, and memory across generations.

Booklist also gave the novel a starred review, stating, "Bankole's writing is both intimate and expansive, drawing readers into the personal lives of her characters while addressing larger societal issues, particularly the systemic prejudice against women in Nigeria and American contexts. The Edge of Water is a gripping, heartfelt novel that showcases the promise of an emerging author and leaves readers eagerly awaiting her next work."

Oprah Daily named the novel a "Best Book of the Month," describing it as a "captivating debut [that] finally captures the catastrophe on a scale that is at once human and global..."

Electric Literature highlighted the novel's engagement of prophecy and fate against the backdrop of Hurricane Katrina, stating "[t]his multi-generational novel is an insightful testament to the power of bonds between mothers and daughters."

In The Lagos Review, Olukorede Yishau focused on the novel's exploration of fate and agency, arguing that it resisted presenting destiny as either wholly fixed or wholly avoidable. The book is lauded as "an emotionally resonant exploration of the delicate interplay of fate and agency, which also explores the intersections of Nigerian, African, Christian and Yoruba cultures."

In a review for Afrocritik, Evidence Egwuono Adjarho praised the novel's portrayal of Yoruba cosmology and matrilineal inheritance, as well as its depiction of immigration and diasporic identity.

Reviewing the novel for The Advocate, Rien Fertel praised Bankole's rendering of New Orleans and her exploration of the city's African roots as important for "transporting New Orleans...to the shores of West Africa."

The Edge of Water was named one of TIME's "100 Must-Read Books of 2025".
