= 2023 Governor General's Awards =

Canadian literary award

The shortlisted nominees for the 2023 Governor General's Awards for Literary Merit were announced on October 25, 2023, and the winners were announced on November 8.

== English ==
Category	Winner	Nominated
Fiction	Anuja Varghese, Chrysalis	Suzette Mayr, The Sleeping Car Porter; Janika Oza, A History of Burning; Iain Reid, We Spread; Kai Thomas, In the Upper Country
Non-fiction	Kyo Maclear, Unearthing	Holly Hogan, Message in a Bottle; Monia Mazigh, Gendered Islamophobia: My Journey with a Scar(f); Harrison Mooney, Invisible Boy; Angela Sterritt, Unbroken: My Fight for Survival, Hope, and Justice for Indigenous Women and Girls
Poetry	Hannah Green, Xanax Cowboy	Robert Bringhurst, The Ridge; Conor Kerr, Old Gods; Amy Ching-Yan Lam, Baby Book; Susan Musgrave, Exculpatory Lilies
Drama	Cliff Cardinal, As You Like It, A Radical Retelling	Darla Contois, The War Being Waged; Hiro Kanagawa, Forgiveness; Suvendrini Lena, The Enchanted Loom; Jordan Tannahill, Is My Microphone On?
Children's literature	Sarah Everett, The Probability of Everything	Michelle Kadarusman, Berani; Zoulfa Katouh, As Long as the Lemon Trees Grow; Iain Lawrence, Fire on Headless Mountain; Kim Spencer, Weird Rules to Follow
Children's illustration	Jack Wong, When You Can Swim	Monica Arnaldo, Mr. S; Jon Klassen, The Skull; Buffy Sainte-Marie and Julie Flett, Still This Love Goes On; Nancy Vo, Boobies
French to English translation	Peter McCambridge, Rosa's Very Own Personal Revolution (Éric Dupont, La Logeuse)	Arielle Aaronson, Alone: The Journeys of Three Young Refugees (Paul Tom, Seuls); D. M. Bradford, House Within a House (Nicholas Dawson, Désormais, ma demeure); Émilie Monnet, Okinum (her own play of the same name); Susan Ouriou, Kukum (Michel Jean, Kukum)

== French ==
Category	Winner	Nominated
Fiction	Marie Hélène Poitras, Galumpf	David Clerson, Mon fils ne revint que sept jours; Brigitte Haentjens, Sombre est la nuit; Carole Labarre, Lʼor des mélèzes; Stéfani Meunier, Une carte postale de lʼocéan
Non-fiction	Philippe Bernier Arcand, Faux rebelles : Les dérives du politiquement incorrect	Martine Béland, Mégaptère; Frédéric Bérard, Jʼaccuse les tortionnaires dʼOmar Khadr; Francis Dupuis-Déri, Panique à l'Université; Dahlia Namian, La société de provocation
Poetry	Rita Mestokosho, Atikᵁ utei. Le cœur du caribou	Virginie Chaloux-Gendron, La fabrique du noir; Louise Dupré, Exercices de joie; Sebastián Ibarra Gutiérrez, À terre ouverte; Virginie Savard, Les deuils transparents
Drama	Mathieu Gosselin, Gros gars	Martin Bellemare, Charlie, du vent derrière le nombril; Rébecca Déraspe, Les Glaces; Nathalie Doummar, Mama; Soleil Launière, Akuteu
Children's literature	Lou Beauchesne, Linoubliable	J.L. Blanchard, Zipolaris Tome 3 : La malédiction de Zangra; Sylvie Drapeau, Escarpolette; Mylène Goupil, Mélie quelque part au milieu; Jean-Christophe Réhel, Le plancher de la lune
Children's illustration	Samuel Larochelle and Ève Patenaude, Le plus petit sauveur du monde	Geneviève Bigué, Parfois les lacs brûlent; Iris Boudreau, Gervais et Conrad; Boucar Diouf and François Thisdale, Le Bourlingueur de Matungoua; Maude Nepveu-Villeneuve and Agathe Bray-Bourret, Je t'écris de mon lit
English to French translation	Catherine Ego, Dans lʼombre du soleil: Réflexions sur la race et les récits (Esi Edugyan, Out of the Sun: On Race and Storytelling)	Dominique Fortier, Nʼayons pas peur du ciel (Emma Hooper, We Should Not Be Afraid of the Sky); Marie Frankland, Tout est bien (Mona Awad, All's Well); Luba Markovskaia, Père fictif (Joe Ollmann, Fictional Father); Madeleine Stratford, soufrelangue (Rebecca Salazar, sulphurtongue)
