= Love Marriage =

Love Marriage may refer to:

- Love marriage, a marital union based on love, affection and attraction

== Film ==
- Love Marriage (1942 film), a French comedy directed by Henri Decoin
- Love Marriage (1959 film), an Indian Hindi-language film directed by Subodh Mukherjee
- Love Marriage (1975 film), an Indian Malayalam-language film directed by Harihara
- Love Marriage (1984 film), an Indian Hindi-language film directed by Mehul Kumar
- Love Marriage (2001 film), an Indian Tamil-language film directed by K. Subash
- Love Marriage (2015 film), a Bangladeshi romantic drama directed by Shahin Sumon
- Love Marriage (2023 film), an Indian Bengali-language romantic comedy directed by Premendu Bikash Chaki
- Love Marriage (2025 film), an Indian Tamil-language romantic comedy directed by Shanmuga Priyan

== Other uses ==
- Love Marriage (TV series), a 2002 Indian Hindi-language series
- Love Marriage (novel), a 2008 novel by V. V. Ganeshananthan

== See also ==
- Love and Marriage (disambiguation)
- Love Marriage Ya Arranged Marriage, an Indian TV show
- Arranged marriage
  - Arranged marriage in the Indian subcontinent
