= Carol Shields Prize for Fiction =

Literary award

- Awarded for: English literature by female or non-binary writers in Canada or the United States
- Country: United States
- Reward: US$150,000 (2024)
- First award: 3 May 2023; 3 years ago
- Final award: 1 May 2025; 18 months ago
- Currently held by: Julia Elliott, Hellions (2026)
- Website: carolshieldsprizeforfiction.com

The Carol Shields Prize for Fiction is a North American literary award, created in 2020 to honour literature by women. The annual prize awards US$150,000 to the winning work and US$12,500 to each of the shortlisted finalists, making it one of the world's richest literary awards.

The prize is awarded to a Canadian or American woman or non-binary writer for a work published in English. French-language literature by Canadians, and Spanish-language literature by Americans, will be eligible when published in an English translation. Submissions are judged by a jury that includes at least one Canadian, one American and one international judge. Novelist Carol Shields was selected as the namesake of the award, both in honour of her record as an advocate and mentor for women writers and because of her status as a dual citizen of both countries. The winner will also receive a residency at the Fogo Island writers' retreat. In addition, the winner will also select an emerging female or non-binary writer, who will receive a year-long mentorship.

The prize was created by Canadian novelist Susan Swan and editor Janice Zawerbny, with an organizing committee that has included noted women literary figures such as Alice Munro, Dionne Brand, Jane Urquhart, Charlotte Gray, Margaret Atwood, Marie-Claire Blais, Natasha Trethewey, Jane Smiley, Francine Prose and Erica Jong. Alexandra Skoczylas is the current chief executive officer.

The first award was in 2023, with the longlist announced on March 8, the shortlist on April 6 and the winner on May 4. The 2024 award was announced on 13 May.

== Nominees and winners ==
Nominees for the Carol Shields Prize for Fiction
Year	Jury	Author	Book	Result	Ref
2023	Anita Rau Badami; Merilyn Simonds; Monique Truong; Katherena Vermette; Crystal Wilkinson	Fatimah Asghar	When We Were Sisters	Winner	
2023	Anita Rau Badami; Merilyn Simonds; Monique Truong; Katherena Vermette; Crystal Wilkinson	Daphne Palasi Andreades	Brown Girls	Shortlist	
2023	Anita Rau Badami; Merilyn Simonds; Monique Truong; Katherena Vermette; Crystal Wilkinson	Talia Lakshmi Kolluri	What We Fed to the Manticore	Shortlist	
2023	Anita Rau Badami; Merilyn Simonds; Monique Truong; Katherena Vermette; Crystal Wilkinson	Suzette Mayr	The Sleeping Car Porter	Shortlist	
2023	Anita Rau Badami; Merilyn Simonds; Monique Truong; Katherena Vermette; Crystal Wilkinson	Alexis Schaitkin	Elsewhere	Shortlist	
2023	Anita Rau Badami; Merilyn Simonds; Monique Truong; Katherena Vermette; Crystal Wilkinson	Andrea Barrett	Natural History	Longlist	
2023	Anita Rau Badami; Merilyn Simonds; Monique Truong; Katherena Vermette; Crystal Wilkinson	Lisa Hsiao Chen	Activities of Daily Living	Longlist	
2023	Anita Rau Badami; Merilyn Simonds; Monique Truong; Katherena Vermette; Crystal Wilkinson	Francine Cunningham	God Isn't Here Today	Longlist	
2023	Anita Rau Badami; Merilyn Simonds; Monique Truong; Katherena Vermette; Crystal Wilkinson	Kali Fajardo-Anstine	Woman of Light	Longlist	
2023	Anita Rau Badami; Merilyn Simonds; Monique Truong; Katherena Vermette; Crystal Wilkinson	Liana Finck	Let There Be Light	Longlist	
2023	Anita Rau Badami; Merilyn Simonds; Monique Truong; Katherena Vermette; Crystal Wilkinson	Emma Hooper	We Should Not Be Afraid of the Sky	Longlist	
2023	Anita Rau Badami; Merilyn Simonds; Monique Truong; Katherena Vermette; Crystal Wilkinson	Gish Jen	Thank You, Mr. Nixon	Longlist	
2023	Anita Rau Badami; Merilyn Simonds; Monique Truong; Katherena Vermette; Crystal Wilkinson	Chelene Knight	Junie	Longlist	
2023	Anita Rau Badami; Merilyn Simonds; Monique Truong; Katherena Vermette; Crystal Wilkinson	Tsering Yangzom Lama	We Measure the Earth with Our Bodies	Longlist	
2023	Anita Rau Badami; Merilyn Simonds; Monique Truong; Katherena Vermette; Crystal Wilkinson	Namwali Serpell	The Furrows	Longlist	
2024	Jen Sookfong Lee (Jury Chair); Laila Lalami; Claire Messud; Dolen Perkins-Valdez; Eden Robinson	V. V. Ganeshananthan	Brotherless Night	Winner	
2024	Jen Sookfong Lee (Jury Chair); Laila Lalami; Claire Messud; Dolen Perkins-Valdez; Eden Robinson	Eleanor Catton	Birnam Wood	Shortlist	
2024	Jen Sookfong Lee (Jury Chair); Laila Lalami; Claire Messud; Dolen Perkins-Valdez; Eden Robinson	Claudia Dey	Daughter	Shortlist	
2024	Jen Sookfong Lee (Jury Chair); Laila Lalami; Claire Messud; Dolen Perkins-Valdez; Eden Robinson	Kim Coleman Foote	Coleman Hill	Shortlist	
2024	Jen Sookfong Lee (Jury Chair); Laila Lalami; Claire Messud; Dolen Perkins-Valdez; Eden Robinson	Janika Oza	A History of Burning	Shortlist	
2024	Jen Sookfong Lee (Jury Chair); Laila Lalami; Claire Messud; Dolen Perkins-Valdez; Eden Robinson	Lisa Alward	Cocktail	Longlist	
2024	Jen Sookfong Lee (Jury Chair); Laila Lalami; Claire Messud; Dolen Perkins-Valdez; Eden Robinson	Nicole Cuffy	Dances	Longlist	
2024	Jen Sookfong Lee (Jury Chair); Laila Lalami; Claire Messud; Dolen Perkins-Valdez; Eden Robinson	Aisha Abdel Gawad	Between Two Moons	Longlist	
2024	Jen Sookfong Lee (Jury Chair); Laila Lalami; Claire Messud; Dolen Perkins-Valdez; Eden Robinson	Tania James	Loot	Longlist	
2024	Jen Sookfong Lee (Jury Chair); Laila Lalami; Claire Messud; Dolen Perkins-Valdez; Eden Robinson	Juliana Lamy	You Were Watching from the Sand	Longlist	
2024	Jen Sookfong Lee (Jury Chair); Laila Lalami; Claire Messud; Dolen Perkins-Valdez; Eden Robinson	Catherine Leroux	The Future	Longlist	
2024	Jen Sookfong Lee (Jury Chair); Laila Lalami; Claire Messud; Dolen Perkins-Valdez; Eden Robinson	Rebecca Makkai	I Have Some Questions for You	Longlist	
2024	Jen Sookfong Lee (Jury Chair); Laila Lalami; Claire Messud; Dolen Perkins-Valdez; Eden Robinson	Mona Susan Power	A Council of Dolls	Longlist	
2024	Jen Sookfong Lee (Jury Chair); Laila Lalami; Claire Messud; Dolen Perkins-Valdez; Eden Robinson	Anuja Varghese	Chrysalis	Longlist	
2024	Jen Sookfong Lee (Jury Chair); Laila Lalami; Claire Messud; Dolen Perkins-Valdez; Eden Robinson	C Pam Zhang	Land of Milk and Honey	Longlist	
2025	Diana Abu-Jaber (Jury Chair); Norma Dunning; Kim Fu; Tessa McWatt; Jeanne Thornton	Canisia Lubrin	Code Noir	Winner	
2025	Diana Abu-Jaber (Jury Chair); Norma Dunning; Kim Fu; Tessa McWatt; Jeanne Thornton	Dominique Fortier, tr. Rhonda Mullins	Pale Shadows	Shortlist	
2025	Diana Abu-Jaber (Jury Chair); Norma Dunning; Kim Fu; Tessa McWatt; Jeanne Thornton	Miranda July	All Fours	Shortlist	
2025	Diana Abu-Jaber (Jury Chair); Norma Dunning; Kim Fu; Tessa McWatt; Jeanne Thornton	Sarah Manguso	Liars	Shortlist	
2025	Diana Abu-Jaber (Jury Chair); Norma Dunning; Kim Fu; Tessa McWatt; Jeanne Thornton	Aube Rey Lescure	River East, River West	Shortlist	
2025	Diana Abu-Jaber (Jury Chair); Norma Dunning; Kim Fu; Tessa McWatt; Jeanne Thornton	Eliza Barry Callahan	The Hearing Test	Longlist	
2025	Diana Abu-Jaber (Jury Chair); Norma Dunning; Kim Fu; Tessa McWatt; Jeanne Thornton	Anne Fleming	Curiosities	Longlist	
2025	Diana Abu-Jaber (Jury Chair); Norma Dunning; Kim Fu; Tessa McWatt; Jeanne Thornton	Mubanga Kalimamukwento	Obligations to the Wounded	Longlist	
2025	Diana Abu-Jaber (Jury Chair); Norma Dunning; Kim Fu; Tessa McWatt; Jeanne Thornton	Oonya Kempadoo	Naniki	Longlist	
2025	Diana Abu-Jaber (Jury Chair); Norma Dunning; Kim Fu; Tessa McWatt; Jeanne Thornton	Rachel Kushner	Creation Lake	Longlist	
2025	Diana Abu-Jaber (Jury Chair); Norma Dunning; Kim Fu; Tessa McWatt; Jeanne Thornton	Erica McKeen	Cicada Summer	Longlist	
2025	Diana Abu-Jaber (Jury Chair); Norma Dunning; Kim Fu; Tessa McWatt; Jeanne Thornton	Julia Phillips	Bear	Longlist	
2025	Diana Abu-Jaber (Jury Chair); Norma Dunning; Kim Fu; Tessa McWatt; Jeanne Thornton	V Efua Prince	Kin: Practically True Stories	Longlist	
2025	Diana Abu-Jaber (Jury Chair); Norma Dunning; Kim Fu; Tessa McWatt; Jeanne Thornton	O. O. Sangoyomi	Masquerade	Longlist	
2025	Diana Abu-Jaber (Jury Chair); Norma Dunning; Kim Fu; Tessa McWatt; Jeanne Thornton	Sharon Wahl	Everything Flirts: Philosophical Romances	Longlist	
2026	Carmen Maria Machado; Ivan Coyote; Cherie Dimaline; Chitra Banerjee Divakaruni; Deesha Philyaw				
2026	Carmen Maria Machado; Ivan Coyote; Cherie Dimaline; Chitra Banerjee Divakaruni; Deesha Philyaw	Julia Elliott	Hellions	Winner	
2026	Carmen Maria Machado; Ivan Coyote; Cherie Dimaline; Chitra Banerjee Divakaruni; Deesha Philyaw	Quiara Alegría Hudes	The White Hot	Shortlist	
2026	Carmen Maria Machado; Ivan Coyote; Cherie Dimaline; Chitra Banerjee Divakaruni; Deesha Philyaw	Lee Lai	Cannon	Shortlist	
2026	Carmen Maria Machado; Ivan Coyote; Cherie Dimaline; Chitra Banerjee Divakaruni; Deesha Philyaw	Megha Majumdar	A Guardian and a Thief	Shortlist	
2026	Carmen Maria Machado; Ivan Coyote; Cherie Dimaline; Chitra Banerjee Divakaruni; Deesha Philyaw	Sonya Walger	Lion	Shortlist	
2026	Carmen Maria Machado; Ivan Coyote; Cherie Dimaline; Chitra Banerjee Divakaruni; Deesha Philyaw	Olufunke Grace Bankole	The Edge of Water	Longlist	
2026	Carmen Maria Machado; Ivan Coyote; Cherie Dimaline; Chitra Banerjee Divakaruni; Deesha Philyaw	Caren Beilin	Sea, Poison	Longlist	
2026	Carmen Maria Machado; Ivan Coyote; Cherie Dimaline; Chitra Banerjee Divakaruni; Deesha Philyaw	Jaime Burnet	milktooth	Longlist	
2026	Carmen Maria Machado; Ivan Coyote; Cherie Dimaline; Chitra Banerjee Divakaruni; Deesha Philyaw	Nina Dunic	Suddenly Light	Longlist	
2026	Carmen Maria Machado; Ivan Coyote; Cherie Dimaline; Chitra Banerjee Divakaruni; Deesha Philyaw	Lauren Francis-Sharma	Casualties of Truth	Longlist	
2026	Carmen Maria Machado; Ivan Coyote; Cherie Dimaline; Chitra Banerjee Divakaruni; Deesha Philyaw	Katie Kitamura	Audition	Longlist	
2026	Carmen Maria Machado; Ivan Coyote; Cherie Dimaline; Chitra Banerjee Divakaruni; Deesha Philyaw	Amanda Leduc	Wild Life	Longlist	
2026	Carmen Maria Machado; Ivan Coyote; Cherie Dimaline; Chitra Banerjee Divakaruni; Deesha Philyaw	Ruyan Meng	The Morgue Keeper	Longlist	
2026	Carmen Maria Machado; Ivan Coyote; Cherie Dimaline; Chitra Banerjee Divakaruni; Deesha Philyaw	Molly Olguín	The Sea Gives Up the Dead	Longlist	
2026	Carmen Maria Machado; Ivan Coyote; Cherie Dimaline; Chitra Banerjee Divakaruni; Deesha Philyaw	Janet Rich Edwards	Canticle	Longlist	
