= Activities of Daily Living =

2022 novel by Lisa Hsiao Chen

- Author: Lisa Hsiao Chen
- Language: English
- Genre: Fiction
- Publisher: W. W. Norton & Company
- Publication date: April 12, 2022
- ISBN: 9780393881127

Activities of Daily Living is the first novel by Taiwanese American author Lisa Hsiao Chen, published by W. W. Norton in 2022. It was widely praised, longlisted for the Center for Fiction First Novel Prize, and nominated for the inaugural Carol Shields Prize for Fiction.

== Plot ==
Alice, an immigrant from Taiwan who lives in New York and works freelance as a video editor, and her older sister Amy, a single mother who lives in San Jose, share responsibility for the care of their stepfather, an alcoholic Vietnam Veteran white American who loved making traditional Chinese furniture and now has dementia. The novel interweaves Alice's musings about his decline as she visits him in a succession of assisted living facilities in the San Francisco Bay Area with her increasing obsession with the life and career of Tehching Hsieh, a retired Taiwanese artist in New York known for year-long performance art projects. Alice herself habitually works on artistic projects, and is formulating her approach to one about the Artist, a response to Hsieh. She conceives of looking after her father as also a project, and after he dies, imagines that if she had shared that with him, he would have told her, "Take your time".

== Reception ==
Activities of Daily Living was generally well received by critics, including starred reviews from Kirkus Reviews and Publishers Weekly. Publishers Weekly included it in their list of the top ten books of 2022, regardless of genre, and Vogue also noted it as one of the best books of the year.

Reviewers commented on the loose narrative structure. The reviewer for Publishers Weekly said that it contributed to a "deeply empathic portrayal" with "careful and illuminating observations on issues of cultural difference, productivity, family, and freedom". Writing in The New Yorker, Hua Hsu described the novel as "digressive without feeling showy, sombre yet never maudlin". Steph Cha wrote in The New York Times that Chen "set out to write an unconventional, rambling novel of ideas and make it hang together with minimal narrative tension"; she described the novel as "an utterly persuasive transmutation of the ordinary stuff of life". The San Francisco Chronicle reviewer wrote that "[t]he whole novel reads like a project coming into existence" and called it "a meditation on human frailty and endurance [that shows] how we cling to our chosen work and the hope buried within it". The reviewer for Booklist referred to the novel as "[a]mbitiously inquisitive and ingeniously compelling" and wrote that it "confronts the liminal spaces between identities, languages, expectations, realities".

== Awards ==
Activities of Daily Living was longlisted for the Center for Fiction First Novel Prize, and for the inaugural Carol Shields Prize for Fiction in 2023.
