= Daphne Palasi Andreades =

American writer

Daphne Palasi Andreades is an American writer, whose debut novel Brown Girls was published in 2022.

== Early ==
Born and raised in Queens, New York, she is a graduate of the MFA creative writing program at Columbia University, where her mentors were Paul Beatty and Elissa Schappell.

== Writing ==
Brown Girls, a novel about a group of multicultural young girls growing up in immigrant families in New York City, was published January 4, 2022 by Random House. International editions were published in the UK and Commonwealth, France, and Germany.

The novel was a finalist for several prestigious prizes including: the 2022 Center for Fiction First Novel Prize, the 2022 New American Voices Award, and the inaugural Carol Shields Prize for Fiction in 2023. It was a semifinalist for the 2022 VCU Cabell First Novelist Award.

== Awards ==
Brown Girls was named a New York Times Editors' Choice and an Indie Next Pick by booksellers across the U.S. It was also named one of the Best Books of the Year by Popsugar and Kirkus.

Year	Title	Award	Result	Ref
2022	Brown Girls	Center for Fiction First Novel Prize	Shortlisted	
2022	Brown Girls	New American Voices Award	Shortlisted	
2022	Brown Girls	VCU Cabell First Novelist Award	Longlisted	
2023	Brown Girls	Carol Shields Prize for Fiction	Shortlisted	

== Bibliography ==
- —— (2022). Brown Girls (1st paperback ed.). Random House. ISBN 9780593243442.
