= The Hundred-Year House =

2014 novel by Rebbeca Makkai

- Author: Rebecca Makkai
- Language: English
- Genre: Fiction
- Publisher: Viking Press
- Publication date: July 2014

The Hundred-Year House is a novel by Rebecca Makkai. Her second novel, it is set in the Northern suburbs of Chicago, and was published by Viking Press in July 2014.

== Plot Summary ==
The novel is divided into sections, each one going further back in time. The first begins in 1999, when Zee and her husband Doug move back into the Devohr family estate, Laurelfield, with their parents and in-laws. Doug, a failing academic, becomes obsessed with researching the poet Edward Parfitt, who spent time at the estate when it was an artists' colony in the early 20th century, before disappearing. The family is plagued by "ghosts" and secrets hidden in a locked attic.

The next section is set in 1955, and follows Zee's parents, Grace and George, as well as their house staff. At the end of the section, Grace and George die in a car accident and their identities are taken by their chauffeur, Max, and their maid, Amy. So Zee's parents are actually Max and Amy.

The third section goes back to 1929 when the estate was an artists' colony. Edwin Parfitt fakes his suicide and takes on the identity of Max. So Edwin becomes Max, then George, and Amy becomes Grace.

== Critical reception ==
The book received starred reviews in Booklist, Publishers Weekly and Library Journal. The book won the 2014 Traditional Fiction Book of the Year award from the Chicago Writers Association and BookPage Best Book of 2014. It was recommended by the Chicago Tribune.

Meghan Daum wrote in the New York Times Book Review: "Makkai guides her twisty, maximalist story with impressive command and a natural ear for satire. Equal parts screwball comedy, intellectual sex farce, historical drama and old-fashioned ghost story, The Hundred-Year House sometimes feels like the precocious love child of John Irving's The Hotel New Hampshire and a rousing game of Clue."
