= Love and Marriage (disambiguation) =

"Love and Marriage" is a song popularized by Frank Sinatra.

Love and Marriage may also refer to:

== Film and television ==
- Love and Marriage (film), a 1964 Italian film
- Love and Marriage (1959 TV series), an American sitcom on NBC starring William Demarest
- Love and Marriage (1984 TV series), a Yorkshire Television anthology series
- Love and Marriage (1996 TV series), an American sitcom on Fox starring Anthony Denison
- Love and Marriage (2013 TV series), a British comedy-drama on ITV
- "Love and Marriage" (2point4 Children), a 1991 television episode
- "Love and Marriage" (M*A*S*H), a 1975 television episode
- "Love and Marriage" (Masters of Sex), a 2013 television episode
- "Love and Marriage" (The Vicar of Dibley), a 1998 television episode
- "Love and Marriage" (Will & Grace), a 1998 pilot television episode

== Other uses ==
- "Love (and Marriage)", the theme of the 2013 Pride in London festival

== See also ==
- Love Marriage (disambiguation)
