= 2 Hours Doing Nothing =

2020 viral YouTube video

- A still from the video
- Indonesian: 2 Jam Nggak Ngapa-ngapain
- Produced by: Muhammad Didit
- Release date: 10 July 2020
- Running time: 140 minutes
- Country: Indonesia

"2 Hours Doing Nothing" (Indonesian: 2 Jam Nggak Ngapa-ngapain) (Note: "Jam" was capitalized as emphasis to its duration.) was a two-hour video created by Madurese YouTuber Muhammad Didit, published on his YouTube channel Sobat Miskin Official (Official Broke Gang) (Note: Created on 4 February 2020. Later renamed to 'Didit Deelon.') on 10 July 2020 at 11:21:44 UTC. (Note: Local time is either 18:21:44 (WIB), 19:21:44 (WITA), or 20:21:44 (WIT).) The video features Didit staring at the camera in his bedroom for two hours. It was originally intended to be a 10-minute video. It surpassed four million views, and a mobile game of the same name was later published.

== Summary and production ==
The video was 2 hours, 20 minutes and 52 seconds in length; it features 21-year-old Madurese YouTuber Muhammad Didit Delon in his bedroom sitting on the floor staring at nothing. A viewer counted Didit blinking 362 times. Apart from the twelve seconds starting at 2:20:39, Didit remains tense throughout. The video was shot between 23 and 1 o'clock local time, with preparation beginning 30 minutes earlier. Didit originally planned the video to be only 10 minutes long. Didit stated that he feared his parents would call him out of his room while the video was being recorded. He stated that the video was a sarcastic commentary, responding to Indonesian netizens continually ranting about the lack of "educational" content on the Internet. He stated that the video "depends on you the viewers to filter; that is my only advice to all of you, and I hope that you will be entertained and benefited from this video."

== Reception ==
The video, published on YouTube, went viral, with Times Now reporting 1.7 million views on the day of its release, India.com reporting 2 million views as of 3 August, Beebom reporting 2.5 million views as of 9 August, and Tribun News reporting 3 million views as of one month since release. As of April 2022, the video has received over 5.8 million views with 193,000 likes.

In addition to several memes using the video's clips seen on Instagram and Twitter, the video hit trending on 9GAG. Didit stated that he did not expect such attention, that the video was only meant for his subscribers. Prior to this, Didit's primary focus had been the food genre.

The comment section itself attracted media attention. Some said Didit should register the video for the Cannes Film Festival; others imagined Didit forgetting to press the "Record" button and wasting his time. Many challenged Didit to make a similar video but with longer duration, or follow-up videos like "2 Hours Saying Alhamdulillah", "2 Hours Waiting Duck to Lay Egg", "1 Hour Begging Subscribers", and "2 Hours Holding Breath".

Vice said that it was part of a trend in Indonesia, but also found similar international videos such as "Doing Nothing For 8 Hours Straight", as well as Sitting and Smiling. The video was regarded as "one of the best things on the internet" by Ilyas Sholihyn of AsiaOne, "and [people worldwide] are surprised that a video of a random guy doing nothing for two hours is interesting enough to get millions of hits." Online newspaper World of Buzz compared Didit to comedian Russell Peters. UNILAD wrote, "Growing up, [...] parents all over the world say the same thing: 'You can't just sit about all day doing nothing.' [...] However, one man (Didit) has bucked the adage with his latest video." The Hindustan Times called him "inspirational". Former Jakarta Vice Governor Sandiaga Uno praised the video for being "cool and original", as well as accurately capturing the boredom of staying home during the COVID-19 pandemic. In an interview, he opined that the video is "based on authenticity", and that "content is king, [and] timing is queen. The timing was perfect."

== Video game adaptation ==
A mobile game of the same name was launched on Google Play by developer Hepitier. The main menu is a white screen with a text reading "Touch screen to begin," (Note: Indonesian: Sentuh layar untuk mulai.) and the game displays a bald man against a light gray background doing what Didit did, with a stopwatch below. As it hits 2:00:01, an end card reads "Congratulations! You've successfully done nothing for 2 hours." (Note: Indonesian: Selamat! Kamu tidak ngapa-ngapain selama 2 jam.) As of August 2020, it has been downloaded over 10,000 times.

== See also ==
- Deadpan, humor device used in the video
- Endurance art
- Sitting and Smiling
