= V. V. Ganeshananthan =

American writer (born 1980)

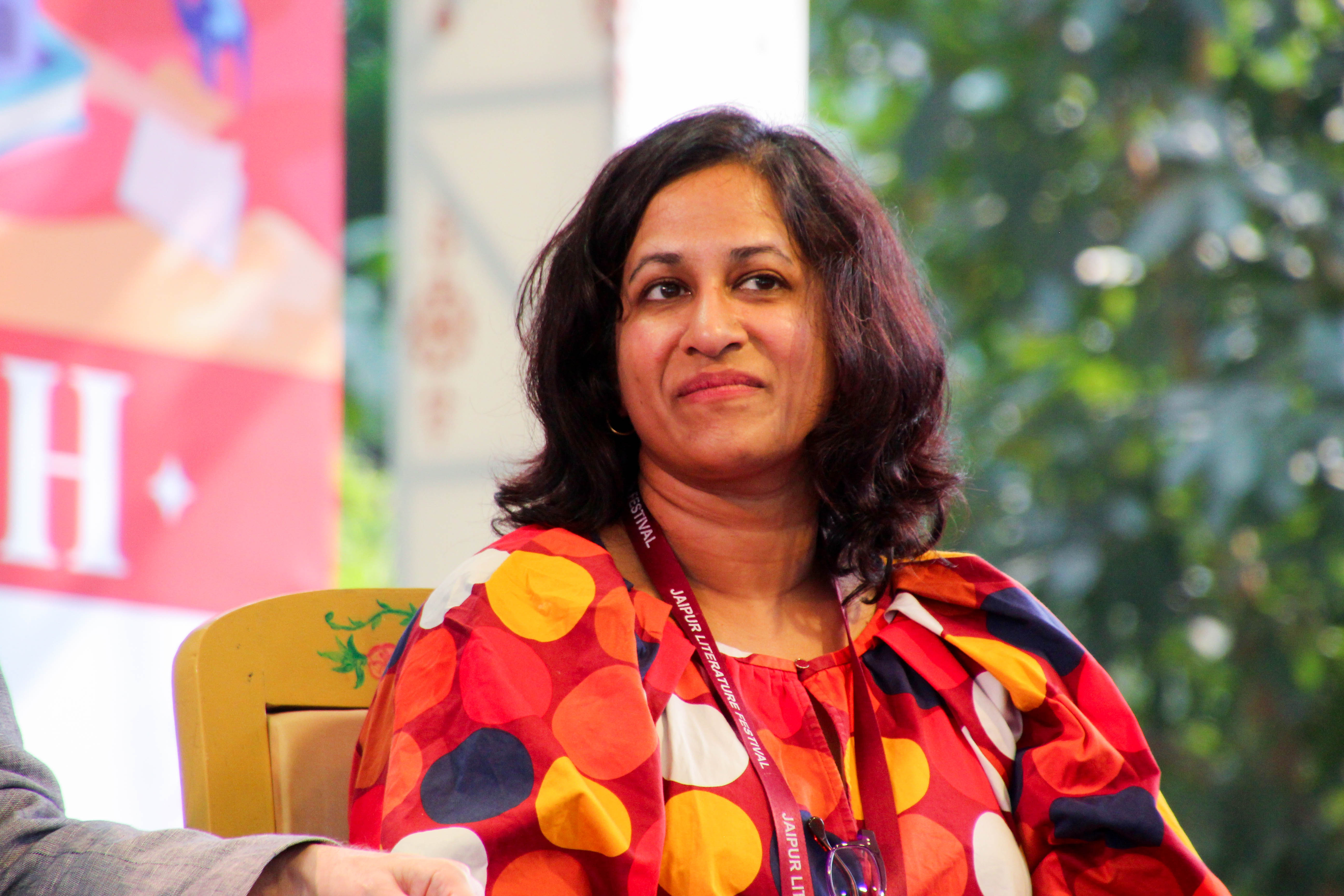
- Born: 1980 (age 45–46)
- Education: Harvard College (BA); University of Iowa (MFA); Columbia University Graduate School of Journalism (MA)
- Occupation: Writer
- Writing career
- Notable works: Love Marriage; Brotherless Night
- Website: vasugi.com

V. V. Ganeshananthan (born 1980) is an American fiction writer, essayist, and journalist. Her work has appeared in many leading newspapers and journals, including Granta, The Atlantic Monthly, and The Washington Post.

Ganeshananthan is the author of Love Marriage, a novel set in Sri Lanka and North America, which was published by Random House in April 2008. Love Marriage was named one of The Washington Post Book World's Best of 2008 and appeared on the longlist for the Orange Prize. It was also selected as a Barnes & Noble Discover Great New Writers Pick.

Ganeshananthan's second novel, Brotherless Night, is set in the early years of the Sri Lankan civil war and was published by Penguin Random House in January 2023. Selected as a New York Times Editors' Choice book, it won the 2024 Carol Shields Prize for Fiction and the 2024 Women's Prize for Fiction. It was also nominated for a 2024 Minnesota Book Award in the Novel and Short Story category.

== Biography ==
Ganeshananthan graduated from Harvard College in 2002, where she served as managing editor of The Harvard Crimson, and later earned her M.F.A. at the University of Iowa in 2005. In 2007, she earned another master's degree from the Columbia University Graduate School of Journalism, where she was a Bollinger Fellow specializing in arts and culture journalism.

She was the Zell Visiting Professor of Creative Writing at the University of Michigan through 2014. In 2015, she began teaching at the University of Minnesota.

She is a past vice president of the South Asian Journalists Association and now serves on the board of the Asian American Writers' Workshop, as well as on the graduate board of The Harvard Crimson. She is also an elected director on the board of the American Institute for Sri Lankan Studies.

== Work ==
=== Love Marriage ===
Ganeshananthan began Love Marriage as part of her senior thesis at Harvard University under the direction of Jamaica Kincaid. In a series of vignettes, Ganeshananthan's novel chronicles how Sri Lankan politics have affected and continue to affect a particular family. Its narrator, Yalini, is a young woman born to Sri Lankan parents in New York on July 23, 1983—the same day as one of the most violent episodes in the Sri Lankan Civil War, Black July. The novel follows Yalini and her family from suburban America to Toronto, where they reunite with an uncle who has left Sri Lanka after a life of militancy with the Tamil Tigers.

=== Brotherless Night ===
Ganeshananthan worked on Brotherless Night for nearly 20 years before its publication on January 3, 2023. The novel follows sixteen-year-old Sashikala "Sashi" whose dream of becoming a doctor is disrupted when her four brothers are swept up by the early years of the Sri Lankan Civil War. Sashi begins work at a field hospital for the minority Tamil militants before she is convinced by a feminist Tamil medical school professor to join her dangerous journey documenting human rights violations.

== Bibliography ==
=== Books ===
- Love Marriage (2008)
- Brotherless Night (2023)

=== Short fiction ===
- "Hippocrates." Granta, Winter 2009.
- "Enter the Body." Himal Southasian, October/November 2009.
- "A Just Country." Esquire, May 7, 2008.

=== Selected articles ===
- "In Ukraine, as in other wars, the full history will take years to tell and it will be told by women." The Los Angeles Times. December 27, 2022.
- "The Buzz Board." The Daily Beast. December 28, 2009.
- "Two Mr. Foxes, Two Views of Food." The Atlantic. December 14, 2009.
- "I Don’t Want To Fight (in conversation with Amitava Kumar)." Guernica." November 2009.
- "The Buzz Board." The Daily Beast. October 25, 2009.
- "Written in the Stars." The Washington Post. October 19, 2008.
- "The Buzz Board." The Daily Beast. July 28, 2009.
- "I Wrote a Story, Not the Whole Story." The Washington Post. July 13, 2008.
- "Whale Country." EGO Magazine. September 20, 2007.
- "The Big Picture." (Co-authored with James Fallows) The Atlantic Monthly. October 2004.
- "The outsider-geeks of the Dean campaign join forces with Al Gore, the most mainstream geek in American politics." The American Prospect. December 11, 2003.
- "The Late-Decision Program." The Atlantic Monthly. November 2003.
- "Home School." The American Prospect. September 22, 2003.
- "Retro Active: Bill Clinton can still work a crowd like no other Democrat -- which is both a good and bad thing." The American Prospect. September 16, 2003.
