= Brotherless Night =

2023 novel by V. V. Ganeshananthan

- Author: V.V. Ganeshananthan
- Language: English
- Genre: Fiction
- Publisher: Penguin Books
- Publication date: 3 January 2023
- Pages: 348
- ISBN: 0241611040 (paperback edition)

Brotherless Night is a 2023 coming-of-age novel by V.V. Ganeshananthan set during the Sri Lankan civil war. It centers around 16-year-old Sashi, who dreams of becoming a doctor while her brothers and first love join the Tamil Tigers. It won the Women's Prize for Fiction in 2024 and the Carol Shields Prize for Fiction in 2024.

== Plot ==
16-year-old Sashikala Kulenthiren lives in Jaffna with her parents and her four brothers: Niranjan, Dayalan, Seelan, and Aran. She dreams of becoming a doctor like her grandfather and is developing romantic feelings for her childhood friend K, a medical student whose prompt first aid saves her from serious injury when she is accidentally scalded. While studying for her A-levels at her grandmother's house in Colombo she witnesses anti-Tamil riots which kill her oldest brother, Niranjan. This prompts K and two of her remaining brothers to join the Tamil Tigers. As Sashi studies medicine during the Sri Lankan civil war, she confronts difficult questions about loyalty, duty and what it means to be a good person.

== Characters ==
- Sashikala Kulenthiren
- K, first love and friend of Sashi
- Niranjan, Sashi's oldest brother
- Dayalan, Sashi's brother
- Seelan, Sashi's brother
- Aran, Sashi's brother and the youngest child of the family
- Amma, Sashi's mother
- Appa, Sashi's father
- Anjali Premachandran, Sashi's anatomy professor
- Chelvi, Sashi's friend
- Hasna, Sashi's friend
- Bhavni, Sashi's friend
- Josie, Sashi's friend whose boyfriend is a Tamil Tiger

== Reception ==
Writing in The New York Times Book Review, Omar El Akkad praised Ganeshananthan's prose throughout, noting that she is a writer with "remarkable restraint", while at other times, she "can loosen her restraint to pull off gorgeous sentences" as well as called the use of second person narration "one of the most interesting stylistic elements in the novel." Publishers Weekly reviewed the novel positively, saying, "Ganeshananthan credibly captures the horrors and pain of the conflict felt by those caught between loyalties. It all makes for a convincing and illuminating war novel." The Guardian reviewed Brotherless Night positively calling it "a spectacular work of historical fiction: thoroughly researched, brimming with outrage and compassion, and full of indelible imagery."
