= Amanda Leduc =

Canadian writer

- Born: British Columbia
- Occupation: Writer
- Website: amandaleduc.com

Amanda Leduc is a Canadian writer. She is known for her books Disfigured: On Fairy Tales, Disability, and Making Space and The Centaur's Wife.

== Career ==
Leduc's first novel, The Miracles of Ordinary Men, was published in 2013 by ECW Press. The novel alternates perspectives between Sam, a man who has recently begun sprouting wings, and Lilah.

From 2016–2024, Leduc was the communications and development coordinator for the Festival of Literary Diversity in Brampton, Ontario. FOLD is Canada's first festival for diverse authors and stories.

In 2020, Leduc's non-fiction book, Disfigured: On Fairy Tales, Disability, and Making Space was published by Coach House Books. The book discusses representations of disability in fairy tales. Disfigured is part memoir and explores Leduc's personal experiences as a disabled person. Leduc was interested in challenging the idea that disability is "synonymous with an unhappy ending". She began writing it after walking in the forest in 2018 and considering how forests, the setting of many fairy tales, are often inherently inaccessible to disabled individuals.

Leduc's 2021 novel, The Centaur's Wife, grew out of a short story of the same name that she wrote in 2014. Leduc originally thought the story would be a novella. Between 2016 and 2019, she re-wrote the novel four times. The Centaur's Wife builds on the themes and ideas of Disfigured insofar as it is a fairy tale that centres disability and difference. The book is dedicated to Leduc's friend Jess, who died in 2019 shortly after the completion of the manuscript.

In 2022, Leduc was a Mabel Pugh Taylor Writer in Residence with the Hamilton Public Library. Leduc's fourth book and third novel, Wild Life, was published in March 2025. It was longlisted for the 2025 Giller Prize and the 2026 Carol Shields Prize for Fiction.

== Personal life ==
Leduc was born in British Columbia. She has congenital cerebral palsy and as a young child developed a limp as a consequence of an operation to remove a cyst from her brain. Leduc also has spastic hemiplegia.

Leduc currently lives in Hamilton, Ontario.

== Works ==
- The Miracles of Ordinary Men (2013)
- Disfigured: On Fairy Tales, Disability, and Making Space (2020)
- The Centaur's Wife (2021)
- Wild Life (2025)

== Awards ==
In 2015, Leduc was a finalist for the Thomas Morton Memorial Prize in Fiction. Leduc's short story, "All This, and Heaven Too", was long-listed for the 2019 CBC short story prize. Disfigured was nominated for a 2021 Aurora Award in the category Best Related Work and was nominated in the non-fiction category at the 28th annual Hamilton Literary Awards. It was also nominated in the non-fiction category at the 2020 Governor General's Literary Awards. The Centaur's Wife was a finalist for the Ontario Library Associations' 2022 Evergreen Awards.

Her novel Wild Life was longlisted for the 2025 Giller Prize, and for the Carol Shields Prize for Fiction in 2026, and shortlisted for the 2026 Sunburst Award for Excellence in Canadian Literature of the Fantastic.
