= Caren Beilin =

- Born: 1983 (age 42–43)
- Education: University of Montana (MFA); University of Utah (PhD)
- Occupation: Writer
- Website: www.carenbeilin.com

Caren Beilin (born 1983) is a writer and Assistant Professor in the Department of English at Case Western Reserve University. She also edits fiction for the Cleveland Review of Books.

== Early life and education ==
Beilin grew up in Germantown, Philadelphia and currently lives in Cleveland, Ohio. She holds a PhD in Literature & Creative Writing from the University of Utah and an MFA in Creative Writing (Fiction) from the University of Montana.

== Writing career ==
She won the 2022 Vermont Book Award for Fiction for Revenge of the Scapegoat (Dorothy, 2022), which was reviewed in several major literary magazines.

Her book Sea, Poison was longlisted for the 2025 National Book Critics Circle Award for Fiction and the 2026 Carol Shields Prize for Fiction.

== Bibliography ==
- Americans, Guests, or Us (Diagram/New Michigan Press, 2012)
- The University of Pennsylvania (Noemi Press, 2014)
- Spain (Rescue Press, 2018)
- Blackfishing the IUD (Wolfman Books, 2019)
- Revenge of the Scapegoat (Dorothy, 2022)
- Sea, Poison (New Directions, 2025)
