= Janika Oza =

Canadian novelist

- Born: Canada
- Occupations: Novelist, short story writer
- Writing career
- Notable works: A History of Burning (2023); "Fish Stories"
- Notable awards: O. Henry Award (2022)
- Website: www.janikaoza.com

Janika Oza is a Canadian novelist. Her debut novel, A History of Burning, was shortlisted for the Governor General's Award for English-language fiction at the 2023 Governor General's Awards, the 2024 Carol Shields Prize for Fiction, and the 2024 Amazon.ca First Novel Award.

Her short story "Fish Stories" won the 2022 O. Henry Award.

== Biography ==
In a piece for Toronto Star discussing her ancestry, Oza explained that her "great-grandparents left British-ruled India for British-ruled East Africa in the early 1900s, where three generations of my family settled, first in Kenya and then in Uganda, until they were exiled in 1972 under the dictator Idi Amin’s decree to expel all Asians from the country." She was the first person in her family to be born in Canada. She further explained that this ancestry helped her explore the questions raised in A History of Burning.

Oza was a school settlement worker.

In 2025 she served on the jury for the Dayne Ogilvie Prize for emerging LGBTQ writers.

== Awards and honours ==
=== Wins ===
- 2019 – The Malahat Review Open Season Award for "Exile".
- 2020 – Kenyon Review Short Fiction Award for "Fish Stories".
- 2022 – O. Henry Award for "Fish Stories".

=== Shortlists ===
- 2023 – Governor General's Award for English-language fiction for A History of Burning.
- 2024 – Amazon.ca First Novel Award for A History of Burning.
- 2024 – Carol Shields Prize for Fiction for A History of Burning.
- 2024 – Dayton Literary Peace Prize for A History of Burning.

=== Longlists ===
- 2019 – CBC Short Story Prize for "The Gift of Choice".

== Works ==
=== Novels ===
- A History of Burning. McClelland & Stewart, 2023. ISBN 9780771002311.

=== Short fiction ===
- "Exile".
- "Fish Stories".
- "The Gift of Choice".

=== Essays ===
- Oza, Janika (2023-06-10). "What does the question 'Where Are You From?' mean when you've always lived here?". Toronto Star. Archived from the original on 2023-11-01.
