= A History of Burning =

2023 novel by Janika Oza

- First edition cover
- Author: Janika Oza
- Language: English
- Publisher: Grand Central Publishing
- Publication date: May 2, 2023
- ISBN: 9781538724248

A History of Burning is a 2023 novel by Canadian author Janika Oza. It was shortlisted for the Governor General's Award for English-language fiction at the 2023 Governor General's Awards and for the 2024 Carol Shields Prize for Fiction.

The 10 perspectives in the novel trace one family's experiences over a century as they migrate from India to Africa and eventually to Canada. During these years, the generations face the challenge of preserving their cultural customs and unity in the face of frequently unwelcoming environments and evolving societal standards.

== Reception ==
A History of Burning was well received by critics, including starred reviews from Booklist, Kirkus Reviews, and Shelf Awareness.

Kirkus referred to the novel as "an ambitious family drama" that "skillfully explores the bonds of kinship and the yearning for peace and security".

Booklist's Shoba Viswanathan highlighted the book's strengths, writing, "This striking epic combines powerful characters of different generations, compelling storytelling, dramatic settings and conflicts, and thoughtful explorations of displacement and belonging, family ties, citizenship, loyalty, loss, and resilience."

Shelf Awareness's Julia Kastner similarly praised the writing: "Oza's gorgeous prose is lush with detail--colors, flavors, emotions--and saturated with loveliness and pain [...] A History of Burning admirably charts how [...] history, both personal and collective, is formed from the stories we tell and the silences we allow to remain."

Publishers Weekly called the novel "impressive", though noted that "the format doesn’t allow for much character development". Despite this, they wrote, "Oza neatly sets her characters’ lives within the context of broader political and economic movements, showing how historical circumstances determine their individual destinies as much as the choices of their forebears. Though it can be tiring, this broad and colorful portrait has plenty of impressive moments."

S. Kirk Walsh, writing for The New York Times Book Review, called A History of Burning "remarkable" and "epic", noting that "tender humanity emanates during these moments of colossal cruelty". However, Walsh indicated that "the plot turns at the novel’s end seem convenient; the story folds too neatly into the overarching metaphor of the book".

== Awards and honors ==
Booklist included A History of Burning on their "Top 10 Historical Fiction Debuts" list for 2023.

The novel was shortlisted for the 2023 Governor General's Award for English-language fiction, the 2024 Amazon Canada First Novel Award, and the 2024 Carol Shields Prize for Fiction.
