= Suvendrini Lena =

Canadian neurologist and stageplay writer

Suvendrini Lena is a Canadian neurologist and writer. She is most noted for her theatrical play The Enchanted Loom, which was a shortlisted finalist for the Governor General's Award for English-language drama at the 2023 Governor General's Awards.

A staff neurologist at Women's College Hospital and the Centre for Addiction and Mental Health, she was born in London, England, to Sri Lankan parents who had left that country during the Sri Lankan Civil War because of their status as a mixed Tamil and Sinhalese couple. The family moved to Toronto, Ontario, when she was a child.

The Enchanted Loom, a play about the enduring psychological effects of the Sri Lankan war, premiered at Toronto's Factory Theatre in 2016, with its cast including Sam Kalilieh and Kawa Ada. It was published in book form by Playwrights Canada Press in fall 2022.

In March 2023 she premiered Rubble, a play inspired by the poetry of Mahmoud Darwish and Lena Khalaf Tuffaha as a meditation on the value and purpose of art in times of crisis, at Toronto's Theatre Passe Muraille.
