= Rebecca Makkai =

American writer (born 1978)

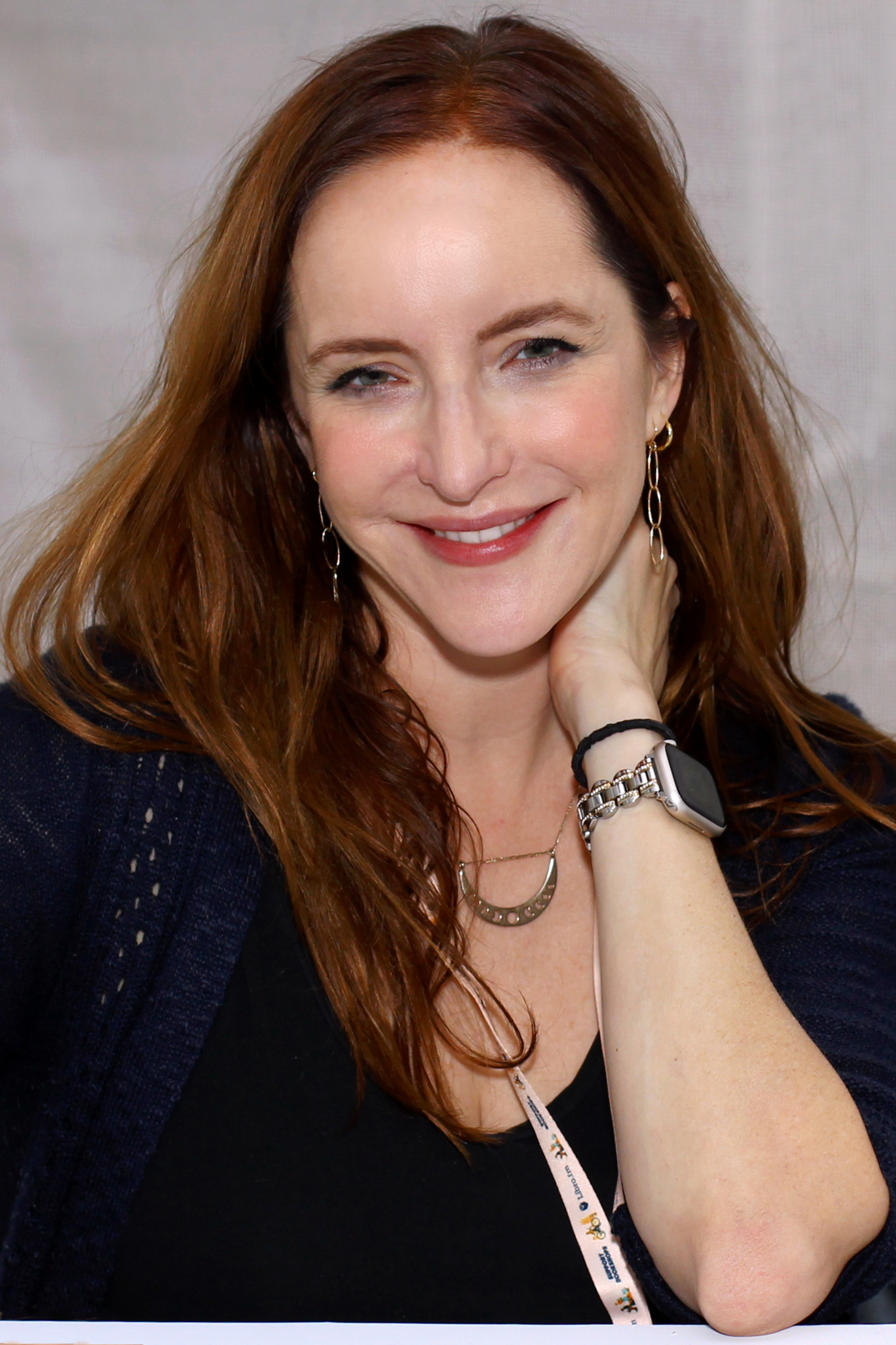
- Makkai at the 2023 Texas Book Festival
- Born: April 20, 1978 (age 48)
- Education: Washington and Lee University (BA); Middlebury College (MA)
- Occupation: Writer
- Writing career
- Notable work: The Great Believers (2018)
- Website: rebeccamakkai.com

Rebecca Makkai (born April 20, 1978) is an American novelist and short story writer. She is best known for writing The Great Believers (2018) and I Have Some Questions for You (2023), which have been positively received by critics and won awards such as the Los Angeles Times Book Prize for Fiction, the Andrew Carnegie Medal for Excellence in Fiction, and the Libby Book Award.

== Early life and education ==
Makkai grew up in Lake Bluff, Illinois. She is the daughter of linguistics professors Valerie Becker Makkai and Ádám Makkai, a refugee to the US following the 1956 Hungarian Revolution. Her paternal grandmother, Rózsa Ignácz, was an actress and novelist in Hungary. Her paternal grandfather, János Makkai, was a journalist and politician and, as a member of the Hungarian Parliament, was principal parliamentary author of Hungary's Second Jewish Law of 1939, before revising his views and being imprisoned by the Gestapo. His problematic legacy is a topic on which Makkai has written extensively in both fiction and essay form. Makkai graduated from Lake Forest Academy and attended Washington and Lee University where she graduated with a B.A. in English. She later earned a master's degree from Middlebury College's Bread Loaf School of English.

== Career ==
=== Writing ===
Makkai's debut novel, The Borrower, was released in June 2011. It was a Booklist Top Ten Debut, an Indie Next pick, an O, The Oprah Magazine selection, and one of Chicago's choices for best fiction of 2011. It was translated into twelve languages.

Her second novel, The Hundred-Year House, is set in the Northern suburbs of Chicago, and was published by Viking Press/Penguin Random House in July 2014. It received starred reviews in Booklist, Publishers Weekly and Library Journal. The book won the 2015 Novel of the Year award from the Chicago Writers Association and was named a best book of 2014 by BookPage.

Makkai's third novel, The Great Believers, is set during the AIDS epidemic in 1980s Chicago and was published by Viking/Penguin Random House in June 2018. The Great Believers won the 2019 Andrew Carnegie Medal for Excellence in Fiction and was a finalist for the 2018 National Book Award for Fiction. It was also a finalist for the 2019 Pulitzer Prize in Fiction, and won the Los Angeles Times Book Prize, the ALA Stonewall Award, and the Chicago Review of Books Award.

In 2024, The New York Times ranked The Great Believers one of "The 100 Best Books of the 21st Century". The novel was also ranked at number 28 in the related "Readers Pick" list.

Makkai's fourth novel, I Have Some Questions for You, was published by Viking in February 2023, and it debuted at number three on the New York Times Bestseller List.

Makkai's debut short story collection, Music for Wartime, was published by Viking in June 2015. A starred and featured review in Publishers Weekly said, "Though these stories alternate in time between WWII and the present day, they all are set, as described in the story "Exposition", within "the borders of the human heart"—a terrain that their author maps uncommonly well." The Kansas City Star wrote that "if any short story writer can be considered a rock star of the genre, it's Rebecca Makkai."

Her short stories have been anthologized in The Best American Short Stories 2008, 2009, 2010, and 2011 and as well as in The Best American Nonrequired Reading 2009 and 2016; she received a 2017 Pushcart Prize, a 2014 NEA Creative Writing Fellowship (worth US$25,000), and a 2022 Guggenheim Fellowship. Makkai's fiction has also appeared in The New Yorker, Ploughshares, Tin House, The Threepenny Review, New England Review, and Shenandoah. Her nonfiction has appeared in Harpers, Salon.com, and The New Yorker. Makkai's stories have also been featured on Public Radio International's Selected Shorts and This American Life.

=== Teaching ===
Makkai has taught at the Iowa Writers' Workshop and is on the MFA faculties of Bennington College and Northwestern University. She is the artistic director of StoryStudio Chicago. Makkai has also taught at Lake Forest College and held the Mackey Chair in Creative Writing at Beloit College in Wisconsin.

== Personal life ==
She has two children and lives in Lake Forest, Illinois. She met her husband, Jon Freeman, at Bread Loaf.

== Awards and honors ==
Awards for Makkai's writing
Year	Title	Award	Category	Result	Ref.
2017	The George Spelvin Players	Pushcart Prize	—	Won	
2018	The Great Believers	Chicago Review of Books Award	Fiction	Won	
2018	The Great Believers	Goodreads Choice Award for	Historical Fiction	Nominated—20th	
2018	The Great Believers	Los Angeles Times Book Prize	Fiction	Won	
2018	The Great Believers	National Book Award	Fiction	Finalist	
2019	The Great Believers	Andrew Carnegie Medal for Excellence	Fiction	Won	
2019	The Great Believers	Chicago Tribune Heartland Prize	Fiction	Won	
2019	The Great Believers	Pulitzer Prize	Fiction	Finalist	
2019	The Great Believers	RUSA Notable Books	Fiction	Selection	
2019	The Great Believers	Stonewall Book Award	Literature	Won	
2023	I Have Some Questions for You	Goodreads Choice Awards	Mystery & Thriller	Nominated—9th	
2023	I Have Some Questions for You	Heartland Booksellers Award	Fiction	Shortlisted	
2023	I Have Some Questions for You	Libby Book Award	Audiobook	Won	
2024	I Have Some Questions for You	Aspen Words Literary Prize	—	Longlisted	
2024	I Have Some Questions for You	Carol Shields Prize for Fiction	—	Longlisted	

== Bibliography ==
=== Novels ===
- The Borrower (2011, Viking)
- The Hundred-Year House (2014, Viking)
- The Great Believers (2018, Viking)
- I Have Some Questions for You (2023, Viking)

=== Short story collections ===
- Music for Wartime (2015, Viking)
