= Hood Feminism =

2020 non-fiction book

- First edition
- Author: Mikki Kendall
- Subject: Intersectionality and feminism
- Publisher: Viking Press
- Publication date: February 25, 2020
- Pages: 288
- ISBN: 978-0-525-56054-8

Hood Feminism is a 2020 non-fiction book by Mikki Kendall about intersectionality and feminism.

== Background ==
It was published on February 25, 2020, by Viking Press.

== Synopsis ==
The book consists of 18 separate essays. Through an intersectional framework, Kendall argues that mainstream feminism has excluded a number of women's issues, particularly those of women of color, and explores how a number of issues affect women, including the education gap, poverty, food and housing insecurity, and gun violence. For example, Kendall argues that mainstream feminist groups have left issues regarding hypersexualization of black girls to be handled by racial justice organizations. Myths and stereotypes attached to marginalized groups prevents them from getting proper help and Kendall argues this in chapters like "Black Girls Don't Have Eating Disorders". Kendall uses her personal experiences of being in an abusive marriage and raising her son in poverty in connection with her essays. Kendall writes that unique struggles differ between women of different communities and comments on the ability of one group of women to oppress another.

== Reception ==
Between June 28, 2020, and June 20, 2021, the book entered the Los Angeles Times's bestsellers list eight times. Time listed the book as one of "100 Must-Read Books of 2020".

Kirkus Reviews praised the book as a "much-needed addition to feminist discourse". Ericka Taylor lauded the prose as "clean, crisp, and cutting" and found that Kendall provided suggestions of how to "reach a more encompassing, intersectional feminism". These suggestions included advocating for women from different racial groups and communities to create overall feminist solidarity. Similarly, Nesrine Malik commends Kendall for renouncing the phrase "black girl magic" and the need for black women to be strong and sassy everyday of their lives. In contrast, Julie Lythcott-Haims of the Washington Post reviewed that some of the book featured "overly generalized" arguments, "opaque" writing and cliches. However, Lythcott-Haims stated that the book is convincing in its conclusion that in America, poor and working-class women of color lack access to necessities such as education, compared to upper-class white women.
