= Lisa Chen =

Taiwanese-American writer

- Born: Lisa Hsiao Chen; Taipei, Taiwan
- Education: University of California, Berkeley (BA); University of Iowa (MFA)
- Occupation: Writer
- Writing career
- Notable awards: Book Award for Poetry

Lisa Hsiao Chen is a Taiwanese-born American writer, based in Brooklyn, most famous for the widely reviewed autofiction Activities of Daily Living.

== Biography ==
Chen was born in Taipei, Taiwan. She earned her B.A. from the University of California, Berkeley, and her M.F.A. from the University of Iowa. Chen's debut poetry collection, Mouth, was published through Kaya Press in 2007. In an interview with Writer's Bone, Chen said she garnered inspiration for her collection from her email spam folder, ads, news items, conversation, and Hokusai's 100 Views of Mount Fuji, among other influences.

She has held residencies at the Lower Manhattan Cultural Council’s Workspace Program and Blue Mountain Center, and was a NYSCA/NYFA Artist Fellowship Finalist in Nonfiction Literature in 2017 and a Center for Fiction Emerging Writers Fellow from 2015 to 2016. She received a 2018 Rona Jaffe Foundation Writers' Award.

In an interview with the Sonora Review, Chen said she is interested in written forms "animated by what Viktor Shklovsky called ostranenie, or 'making strange'—sometimes translated as 'estrangement' or 'defamiliarization.'"

== Awards and honors ==
In 2009, Mouth won the Book Award for Poetry from the Association for Asian American Studies.

Activities of Daily Living was longlisted for the inaugural Carol Shields Prize for Fiction in 2023.
