= The Great Believers =

2019 novel by Rebecca Makkai

- Author: Rebecca Makkai
- Language: English
- Genre: Historical fiction
- Publisher: Viking Press
- Publication date: June 4, 2018
- Publication place: United States
- Pages: 421
- Awards: LAT Book Prize—Fiction (2018); Andrew Carnegie Medal—Fiction (2019); Stonewall Book Award—Fiction (2019)
- ISBN: 978-0735223523

The Great Believers is a historical fiction novel by American writer Rebecca Makkai published on June 4, 2018 by Viking Press.

The novel follows two storylines in alternating chapters. The first, set in 1980s and '90s Chicago, centers on Yale Tishman, an art gallery acquisitions manager living in Boystown. As he navigates a career-defining deal, the largely gay male community to which he belongs crumbles around him due to the devastation of the AIDS epidemic. The second plotline takes place in Paris in 2015. It follows Fiona Marcus, a secondary character from the first storyline, as she searches for her estranged adult daughter and reckons with the lasting impact that the AIDS epidemic has had on her life.

The book was an Andrew Carnegie Medal for Excellence in Fiction winner, National Book Award for Fiction finalist, Stonewall Book Award winner, and Pulitzer Prize for Fiction finalist.

== Plot ==
=== 1985–1992 ===
In 1985 Chicago, Yale Tishman and his long-term boyfriend, Charlie Keene, attend a party honoring the life of Nico Marcus, a close friend who has recently died of AIDS. Overwhelmed by emotion during a slideshow featuring photos of Nico and his friends, Yale briefly retreats to a room upstairs and emerges to an abandoned house. He later learns from Charlie that the partygoers had left to raid Nico's apartment and take his belongings as mementos.

The next morning, Yale heads to work at the Brigg Gallery at Northwestern University, where he has been hired to help build a permanent collection. Upon arriving, Yale learns that Nico's great-aunt, Nora Lerner, with encouragement from Nico's sister Fiona, has offered to donate her personal collection of previously undiscovered pieces by Modigliani, Soutine, Pascin, Foujita, and other Lost Generation artists from the 1920s. The following day, he sets out on an overnight business trip to Nora's home in Door County, Wisconsin, with Cecily Pearce, Northwestern's Director of Planned Giving, to meet Nora and assess the potential authenticity of her collection. She reveals that the paintings and sketches, mostly of her, were given to her as personal gifts by the artists whom she modeled for while attending art school in Paris after World War I. Though Yale remains hopeful after their visit, Cecily is evidently skeptical of the legitimacy of the pieces due to Nora's apparent lack of wealth. Later, she warns Yale that Frank Lerner, Nora's son, has enlisted the help of a major donor to block the donation from occurring so that he can inherit the collection.

At home, tensions rise in the Boystown apartment that Yale and Charlie share. Charlie is prone to fits of jealousy, and his accusatory outbursts are a frequent source of arguments. Since the two have been in a monogamous committed relationship for several years, they believe themselves to be safe from the AIDS epidemic. However, the increasing number of gay men in their immediate circle and wider community testing positive for HIV, developing debilitating symptoms, and dying from AIDS places further stress on their relationship.

Meanwhile, Nora mails photos of her collection to the office that convince Yale and his supervisor, Bill Lindsey, of the pieces' authenticity. They enlist the help of donors Allen and Esmé Sharp and the university's general counsel, Herbert Snow, to financially and legally support the acquisition as soon as possible, as Nora is dying of congestive heart failure and her living descendants actively oppose her donation of the pieces. Yale, Bill, and Yale's graduate student intern Roman travel back to Door County to see the pieces in person. Despite Frank's best efforts to stop them, the group is able to secure the deal and officially acquire Nora's complete set of paintings and sketches as part of the Brigg's permanent collection.

Yale returns home triumphant only to discover that Charlie has contracted HIV/AIDS, having secretly gotten tested after learning of the HIV-positive status of Julian Ames, an attractive young actor in their circle of friends. On the night of Nico's memorial party, Charlie had sex with Julian in a fit of jealousy, believing that Yale had left with Teddy Naples, another friend of theirs. Hurt and filled with rage over Charlie's hypocrisy and infidelity, Yale leaves him and spends the rest of the novel crashing at various places: the apartment of Nico's partner Terrence, Cecily's couch, and eventually the Sharps' spare apartment in the Marina Towers.

Yale and Roman return to Door County twice more to visit Nora and record the stories behind the collection. One condition of her donation is that the gallery display the pieces by Ranko Novak, an unknown artist and her former lover, alongside those by the famous painters in her collection. She reveals that Ranko was the love of her life, but suffered from severe trauma due to his experiences on the battlefield and killed himself in front of her soon after returning from the war. Soon after this visit, Yale leaves the Brigg, sacrificing his job to appease the donor Frank had enlisted to block the donation of Nora's collection. He begins a sexual relationship with Roman, whom he believes to be a repressed Mormon coming into his sexuality. Yale later learns that Roman has been sleeping with various other men, including Bill. He gets retested and learns that he has contracted HIV/AIDS. After cracking one of his ribs at an ACT UP protest, Yale's condition begins to decline. In his final few years, Cecily and Fiona take over his care, and he lives to see the exhibition of Nora's pieces at the Brigg before dying alone in a hospital bed at the Advocate Illinois Masonic Medical Center.

=== 2015 ===
In 2015, Fiona, now a 51-year-old divorcée, flies to Paris to search for her estranged daughter, Claire, who has been missing for three years. The tip she has been given also suggests that Claire has a child, a granddaughter whom Fiona has never known. On the flight, Fiona meets an American journalist named Jake Austen, an alcoholic with a "boomerang wallet" that comes back to him every time he loses it.

While in Paris, she stays with an old friend, Richard Campo, and his much younger boyfriend and publicist, Serge, at their residence on Île Saint-Louis. The unofficial documenter of Fiona and Yale's social circle in Boystown before and during the AIDS epidemic, Richard is now a famous photographer. As he and Serge assist Fiona in tracking down Claire, they are also deep in preparations for Richard's upcoming show at the Centre Pompidou.

After a fruitless first day of searching, Fiona encounters Jake, who has been looking for her in hopes of getting in contact with Richard to potentially write an article about him. After hesitantly agreeing to give him Serge's number, she receives a call from her private investigator, Arnaud, announcing that he has tracked down Kurt Pearce, Cecily's son and Claire's former boyfriend. Claire and Kurt had met during Claire's freshman year of college, and she dropped out of school soon afterwards. The couple then joined a cult known as the Hosanna Collective, and lived on the cult's farm in Boulder, Colorado, for a year before disappearing without a trace.

Fiona and Arnaud discover that Kurt is now married to another woman and break into his apartment, where they find photos of Kurt and Claire's child. Fiona later returns to the apartment to confront Kurt face-to-face; meanwhile, Arnaud tracks down Claire's place of work and arranges a meeting between Fiona and Claire. When they meet, Claire evidently harbors resentment towards her mother and refuses to give Fiona her contact information, but agrees to see her again in two days.

As these events unfold, Fiona attends a couple of art events with Richard, Serge, and Jake, with whom she begins a casual sexual relationship. She also reflects on Claire's childhood and where she feels she went wrong as a mother. Fiona became pregnant with Claire while she was still a college student studying psychology, and her father, Damian Blanchard, was Fiona's professor. Fiona suffered from postpartum depression after having Claire, and she also struggled to open up to Damian due to the trauma of losing so many loved ones during the AIDS epidemic. Fiona's affair with a man she had met at a yoga class only hastened the dissolution of their marriage and eventual divorce. The shadow of the AIDS epidemic loomed large over Claire's childhood–––Claire spent many hours in the resale shop benefiting AIDS housing that Fiona runs, and she grew up hearing countless stories about Fiona's brother and his Boystown friends who also died from AIDS. Most significantly, Claire was born the day before Yale died, in the maternity ward of the same hospital. Claire maintains that Fiona has said the day Claire was born was the worst day of her life.

The city is suddenly thrown into turmoil due to the November 2015 Paris attacks, and Fiona struggles to get into contact with Claire. Meanwhile, Richard surprises her with a visit from Julian, who she had assumed to be long dead from AIDS. The next day, Fiona and Cecily meet Claire's three-year-old daughter, Nicolette, for the first time and babysit her while Claire is at work. While watching Nicolette play in the park, Fiona breaks down in tears and confesses to Cecily that she turned Yale's mother away from the AIDS unit four days before he died. She decides to move to Paris to be with Claire and Nicolette and atone for the regret she feels as a mother.

On the day of Richard's show preview, Fiona and Claire meet in the gift shop of the Pompidou. Claire angrily confronts Fiona for casting the shadow of Yale's death over her entire upbringing. Julian attempts to reconcile them, and Claire unhappily resigns herself to the fact that Fiona will be moving to Paris. The three of them enter the gallery to see Richard's show, which prominently features photos from 1980s Boystown. The novel ends with Fiona watching previously unseen footage of her brother, Yale, and Charlie joking around while they were still happy and healthy.

== Reception ==
The Great Believers received starred reviews from Kirkus, Booklist, Publishers Weekly, and Shelf Awareness, as well as positive reviews from Library Journal, The New York Times Book Review, The Guardian, Los Angeles Review of Books, Entertainment Weekly, The Star Tribune, The Kenyon Review, the San Francisco Chronicle, The Boston Globe, and Lambda Literary, among others.

Writing for the Los Angeles Times, Dan López called The Great Believers "a heartbreaking meditation on AIDS, loss, and friendship." Kirkus said the book was "as compulsively readable as it is thoughtful and moving."

Newsday's Tim Murphy wrote that Makkai "has, in fact, done a superb job of capturing a group of friends in a particular time and place with humor and compassion. Conversations among her gay male characters feel very real — not too flamboyant, not too serious, always morbidly witty. It's hard not to get drawn into this circle of promising young men as they face their brutally premature extinction."

Kirkus named The Great Believers one of the best books of the year. The New York Times ranked it #64 in its list of the best 100 books of the 21st century in 2024.

== Awards ==
Selected awards for The Great Believers
Year	Award	Category	Result	Ref.
2018	Goodreads Choice Award for	Historical Fiction	Nominated—20th	
2018	Los Angeles Times Book Prize	Fiction	Won	
2018	National Book Award	Fiction	Finalist	
2019	Andrew Carnegie Medals for Excellence	Fiction	Won	
2019	Chicago Review of Books Award	?	Won	
2019	Pulitzer Prize	Fiction	Finalist	
2019	RUSA Notable Books	Fiction	Selection	
2019	Stonewall Book Award	Literature	Won	

== Censorship ==
In April 2025, the Lukashenko regime added the book to its "List of printed publications containing information messages and materials, the distribution of which could harm the national interests of Belarus".
