= Love Marriage (novel) =

Novel by V. V. Ganeshananthan

- Author: V.V. Ganeshananthan
- Language: English
- Genre: Fiction
- Publisher: Random House Trade Paperbacks
- Publication date: April 2008
- Pages: 302 (hardback edition)
- ISBN: 978-1400066698 (paperback edition)

Love Marriage (2008) is the debut novel by author V. V. Ganeshananthan set in Sri Lanka and North America. Published by Random House in April 2008, Love Marriage was named one of The Washington Post's Book World's Best of 2008, and appeared on the longlist for the Orange Prize. It was also selected as a Barnes & Noble Discover Great New Writers Pick.

Ganeshananthan began the novel as part of her senior thesis at Harvard University under the direction of Jamaica Kincaid. In a series of vignettes, Ganeshananthan's novel chronicles how Sri Lankan politics have affected and continue to affect a particular family. Its narrator, Yalini, is a young woman born to Sri Lankan parents in New York on July 23, 1983—the same day as one of the most violent episodes in the Sri Lankan Civil War, Black July. The novel follows Yalini and her family from suburban America to Toronto, where they reunite with an uncle who has left Sri Lanka, after a life of militancy with the Tamil Tigers.
