= Sitting and Smiling =

Art performance by Benjamin Bennett

- A still from the fifth Sitting and Smiling video, where a burglar entered Bennett's home.
- Created by: Benjamin Bennett
- Presented by: Benjamin Bennett
- No. of episodes: 327

Original release
- Network: YouTube
- Release: July 28, 2014 – present

Sitting and Smiling is an endurance art performance by Benjamin Bennett. In a typical performance, Bennett looks into a video camera recording him while sitting and smiling motionless for four hours.

Bennett uploaded his first Sitting and Smiling video on July 28, 2014. Over the next several years, he uploaded similar videos at a rate of about one per week. Currently, his videos have earned over 31 million views with over 380,000 subscribers.

Bennett cites Claire Bishop's 2012 Artificial Hells: Participatory Art and the Politics of Spectatorship as an inspiration for his art.

== Walking and Talking ==
On February 24, 2019, after reaching 300 Sitting and Smiling videos, Bennett began a new video series entitled Walking and Talking, in which he walks and talks continuously for four hours, or until his camera battery runs out. He speaks extemporaneously and reflexively, describing his subjective experience in real time, with subjects such as philosophy of mind, consciousness, and nonduality arising out of his self-reflection.

== Incidents on stream ==
During the fifth stream, a burglar entered Bennett's home. After opening the door to Bennett's room, the burglar said, "Hello?" and then proceeded to shut the door and leave. This incident stacked attention online, and the video has over 8.4 million views.

In a separate incident in his 52nd livestream, Bennett clearly urinates himself, with a wet puddle seeping out from under him and gradually evaporating over the remainder of the footage. He never acknowledges this or breaks his composure and continues to sit and smile at the camera.

During streams 238 and 257, Bennett spontaneously bursts into tears several times, briefly losing composure.

== Critical response ==
"There isn't a purpose. My inbox is full of people asking me why I'm doing this, but I don't think that question applies to this type of activity."

— Benjamin Bennett, 2015 interview with Vice Media

One reviewer commented, "One of the strangest aspects of this project is its apparent lack of explanation."

Other reviewers said that the performance was "bizarre", "tip of the creepy iceberg", and "bonkers".

Timothy Kennett of The Atlantic wrote:

Sitting and Smiling is, therefore, an extreme version of engagement with the present. It takes concepts like mindfulness (it is perhaps not coincidental that Bennett's cross-legged pose recalls the stance of meditation), attention to the present, and discomfort with the speed and busyness of modern life and pushes them until they are unpleasant, even unbearable. ...By making the videos borderline unwatchable, Bennett suggests that experiencing time in a way that is unmediated, focused, and 'real' is impossible. But, of course, Bennett manages it, smiling the whole time.

== See also ==
- 2 Hours Doing Nothing
