= Olufunke Grace Bankole =

Nigerian-American writer and novelist

Olufunke Grace Bankole is a Nigerian-American writer and novelist. Her debut novel, The Edge of Water (2025), won the Westport Prize for Literature, the Ploughshares John C. Zacharis First Book Award, and the 2026 VCU Cabell First Novelist Award. The novel was also named one of Time magazine's 100 Must-Read Books of 2025.

== Early life and education ==
Bankole is a first-generation Nigerian American who was born in Maryland and grew up in both the United States and Nigeria. She graduated from Cornell University in 2001 with a degree in government and later attended Harvard Law School. She received a Soros Justice Advocacy Fellowship and subsequently left the legal profession to pursue writing.

== Career ==
Bankole's fiction has appeared in literary journals including Ploughshares, Glimmer Train, AGNI, Michigan Quarterly Review, New Letters, The Antioch Review, and Stand Magazine. Her short story won first place in the Glimmer Train Short-Story Award for New Writers, and she was awarded the Bread Loaf-Rona Jaffe Scholarship in Fiction at the Bread Loaf Writers' Conference. She has also received an Oregon Literary Fellowship in Fiction, a Ludwig Vogelstein Foundation grant, and a Pushcart Prize Special Mention.

=== The Edge of Water ===
Bankole's debut novel, The Edge of Water, was published by Tin House in February 2025. Set between Nigeria and New Orleans, the novel follows three generations of Nigerian women whose lives are shaped by migration, family relationships, religious traditions, and the aftermath of Hurricane Katrina. The story explores the relationship between a mother in Nigeria and her daughter, who moves to the United States, and is told largely through letters and multiple perspectives. Publishers Weekly gave the novel a starred review, praising Bankole's alternating narrative perspectives for deepening readers' understanding of the characters and events. Time included it in its 100 Must-Read Books of 2025.

In September 2025, The Edge of Water won the Westport Prize for Literature. It also received the 2025 Ploughshares John C. Zacharis First Book Award. In 2026, Bankole won the VCU Cabell First Novelist Award, which recognizes an outstanding debut novel published in the preceding year.
