= Julia Elliott =

American writer

- Education: Penn State (MFA); University of Georgia (PhD)
- Occupation: Writer
- Writing career
- Genres: Literary fiction, southern gothic horror, genre-leaping, surrealism, fairy tale
- Notable awards: Carol Shields Prize (2026)
- Website: www.juliaelliott.net

Julia Elliott is an American fiction writer. She won the 2012 Rona Jaffe Foundation Writers' Award for beginning women writers.

== Early life and education ==
Elliott received her Master of Fine Arts from Penn State in 1996, and a PhD in English from the University of Georgia in 2004.

== Career ==
Her work has appeared in The Georgia Review, Tin House, Conjunctions, and The New York Times, and been featured in The Best American Short Stories 2015 and 2019.

Her debut short story collection, The Wilds, was published by Tin House in 2014. The collection was chosen by Kirkus Reviews, Publishers Weekly, and Buzzfeed as one of the "Best Books of 2014" and was a New York Times Book Review Editors’ Choice.

Her debut novel, The New and Improved Romie Futch, was published in 2015. In 2016, she was awarded the Shared Worlds Residency by Amazon.com.

Elliott teaches English and Women's and Gender Studies at University of South Carolina in Columbia, South Carolina.

In 2026, she won the Carol Shields Prize for Fiction for her short story collection Hellions. The book was also a finalist for the 2026 Southern Book Prize.

== Bibliography ==
=== Short story collections ===
- The Wilds. Tin House. 2014. ISBN 9781935639923.
- Hellions. Tin House/Zando. 2025. ISBN 9781963108064.

=== Novels ===
- The New and Improved Romie Futch. Tin House. 2015. ISBN 9781941040157.
