= Boucar Diouf =

Canadian television presenter (born 1965)

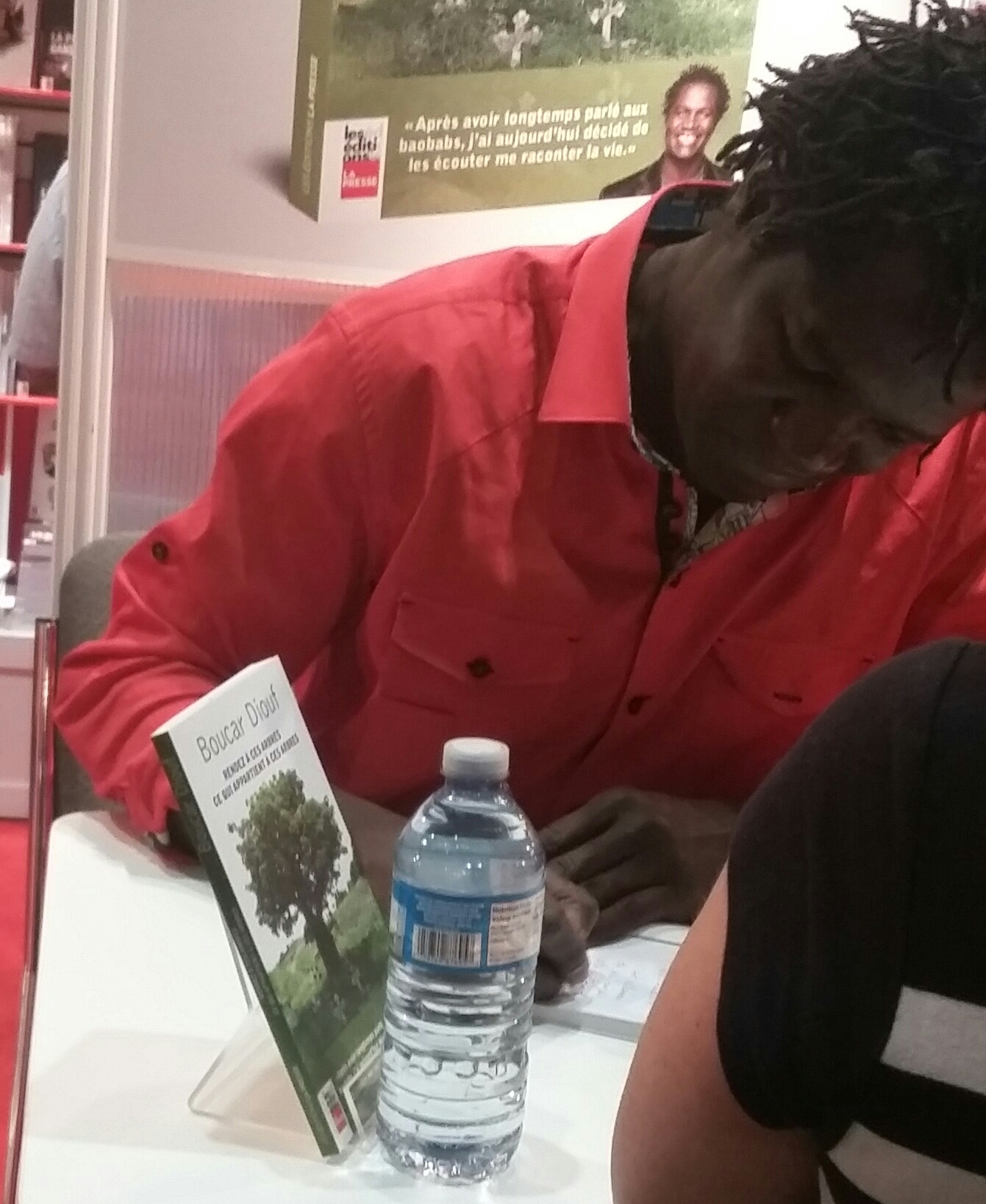
- Boucar Diouf at the Montreal Book Fair, November 2015
- Born: Boucar Diouf; May 26, 1965 (age 61); Fatick, Senegal
- Education: Cheikh Anta Diop University; Université du Québec à Rimouski (PhD)
- Website: Official website

Boucar Diouf (born 26 May 1965 in Fatick, Senegal) is a biologist, oceanographer and comedian of Senegalese origin based in Quebec. He moved to Quebec in 1991 to pursue graduate studies at Rimouski, where he briefly taught biology at the Université du Québec à Rimouski. He now works as a comedian, columnist, and radio host.

His sketches often focus on issues of immigrant integration, life in Africa, and cultural differences.

== Biography ==
After undergraduate and graduate studies in biology at Cheikh Anta Diop University in Dakar, Diouf earned a PhD in oceanography from the Université du Québec à Rimouski (UQAR). He then taught biology at UQAR, working on practical teaching methods in animal physiology. To make his lectures easier to understand, he created humorous capsules called “Boucardises.” It was his students who signed him up for auditions at the Just for Laughs festival.

From 2006 onward, he hosted several television shows. Between 2014 and 2023, he hosted the Radio-Canada program La nature selon Boucar before a live audience of 40 people. He also occasionally takes part in public debates, speaking out on issues such as systemic racism and the low acceptance rate by Ottawa of students from French-speaking Africa.

== Career ==
=== Comedy shows ===
- D'hiver Cités
- L'Africassé-e
- Pour une raison X ou Y
- Magtogoek ou le chemin qui marche
- Nomo sapiens

=== Books ===
- Sous l'arbre à palabres, mon grand-père disait..., Éditions des Intouchables, 2007
- La Commission Boucar pour un raccommodement raisonnable, Éditions des Intouchables, 2008
- Le brunissement des baleines blanches, Éditions des Intouchables, 2011
- Rendez à ces arbres ce qui appartient à ces arbres, Éditions La Presse, 2015
- Boucar disait... pour une raison X ou Y, Éditions La Presse, 2017
- Apprendre sur le tas: la biologie des bouses et autres résidus de digestion, Éditions La Presse, 2018
- Pour l'amour de ma mère – Et pour remercier les mamans, Éditions La Presse, 2019
- La face cachée du grand monde des microbes, Éditions La Presse, 2019
- Les brunissements des baleines blanches, Éditions La Presse, 2020
- Jo Groenland et la route du Nord, Éditions La Presse, 2020
- Jonathan Tenderbear: Et la sagesse du Corbeau, Éditions La Presse, 2021
- La face cachée du grand monde des microbes, Éditions La Presse, 2021
- Ce que la vie doit à la mort: Quand la matriarche de famille tire sa révérence, Éditions La Presse, 2022

=== Television ===
- 2006: La Fosse aux lionnes, columnist
- 2007–2012: Des kiwis et des hommes, co-host and columnist
- 2013: Océania, host
- 2019: Léo (season 2, episode 11) by Fabien Cloutier – role: Boucar
- 2022: Autour d'une dinde, creator and host

=== Film ===
- 2004: Le bonheur c'est une chanson triste

== Awards ==
- 2005: Revelation of the Year, Grand Rire de Québec
- 2006: Jacques-Couture Award – from the Ministry of Immigration and Cultural Communities
- 2011: Mérite du Français en éducation, from the Association des professeurs de français du Québec
- 2011: Prix nez d'or, Grand Rire de Québec festival
- 2013: Charles-Biddle Award, Government of Quebec
- 2014: Pierre Dansereau Award, Association des biologistes du Québec
- 2016: Knight of the National Order of Quebec, presented by Premier Philippe Couillard
- 2019: Medal of Honour of the National Assembly of Quebec
- 2021: Honorary doctorate, Université Laval
