= Mikki Kendall =

American writer (born 1976)

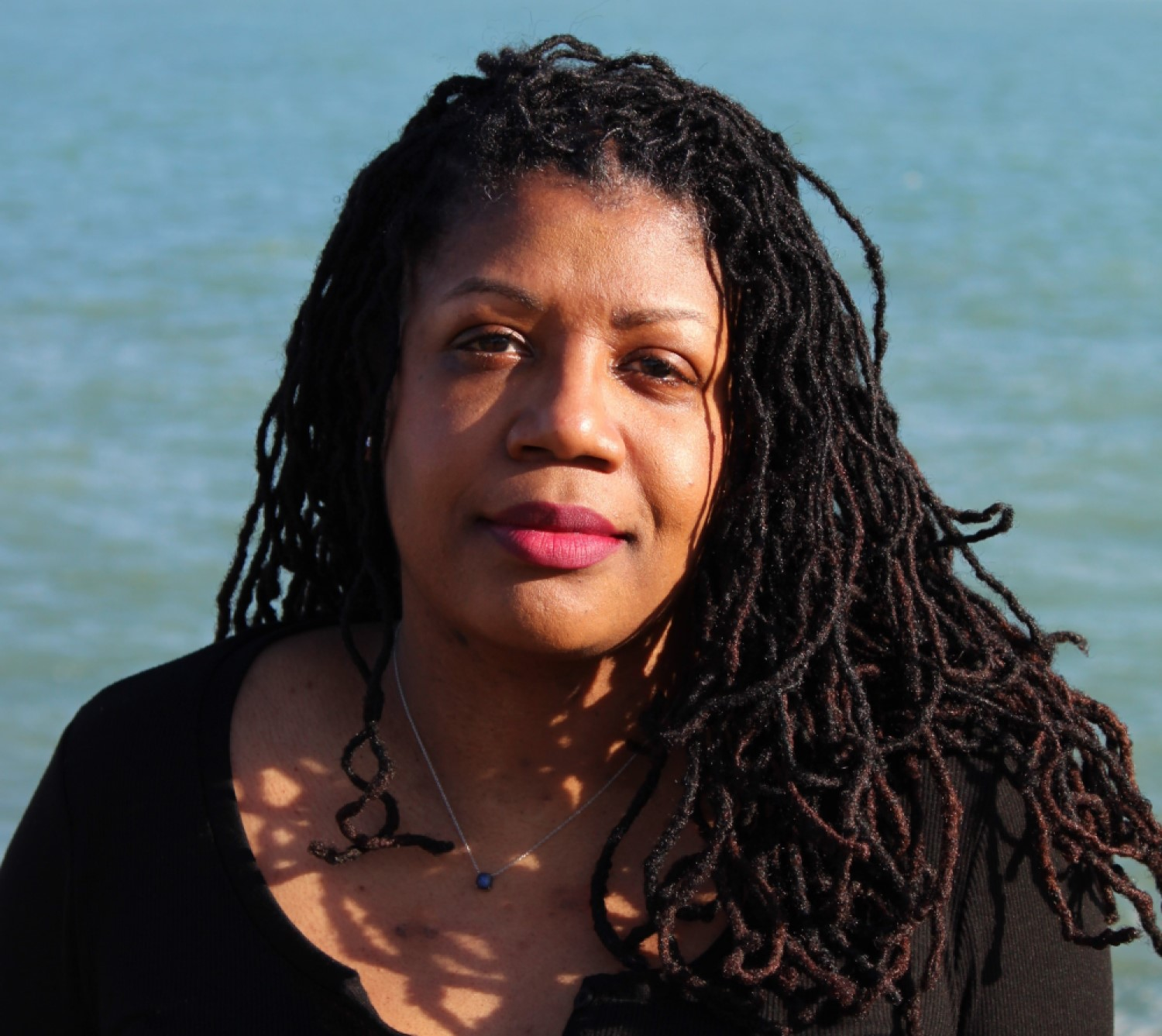
- Born: October 23, 1976 (age 49); Chicago, Illinois, United States
- Occupation: Writer
- Writing career
- Language: English
- Genres: Essays; Cultural critic
- Notable works: Amazons, Abolitionists, and Activists; Hood Feminism
- Website: mikkikendall.com

Mikki Kendall (born October 23, 1976) is an author, activist, and cultural critic. Her work often focuses on current events, media representation, the politics of food, and the history of the feminist movement. Penguin Random House published her graphic novel Amazons, Abolitionists, and Activists in 2019, while her political nonfiction book Hood Feminism was released in early 2020.

== Early life and education ==
Kendall was born in Chicago, Illinois on October 23, 1976 and was raised in the Hyde Park neighborhood of Chicago. Kendall is a 2005 graduate of the University of Illinois at Urbana Champaign. Kendall also has a Masters in Writing and Publishing from DePaul University.

== Career ==
A veteran of the United States Army, Kendall worked in government service until 2013 when she left her job at the Department of Veterans Affairs to pursue her writing career full-time.

Kendall is currently an essayist and cultural critic. She has written for The Guardian, The Boston Globe, NBC News, The Washington Post, Bustle, Essence and Eater (with her essay in Eater "Hot Sauce in Her Bag" named a Best Food Essay by the Association of Food Journalists). She has appeared as a cultural commentator on NPR, Al Jazeera English, and the BBC.

She is recognizable as a member of Black Twitter. Kendall is also the creator of the viral Twitter hashtags #SolidarityIsForWhiteWomen, which criticized racism in the feminist movement, as well as #FastTailedGirls, a reference to the hypersexualization of Black girls, and #FoodGentrification, about the marginalization of traditional foods by commercial interest.

Kendall edited the science-fiction anthology Hidden Youth for Crossed Genres Press in 2016. Kendall's graphic novel history Amazons, Abolitionists, and Activists: A Graphic History of Women's Fight for Their Rights was released in November 2019 by Ten Speed Press and her political-nonfiction book Hood Feminism: Notes From the Women That a Movement Forgot was released in February 2020 by Viking Books. It criticizes the feminist movement for being largely "the province of the privileged" and ignoring problems that disproportionately impact communities of color, including poverty, housing, medical care, and racism.

== Awards and honors ==
- 2017: Best Food Essay Award from the Association of Food Journalists for "Hot Sauce in Her Bag: Southern Black identity, Beyoncé, Jim Crow, and the pleasure of well-seasoned food"

== Bibliography ==
=== Books ===
Title	Publisher	Year	ISBN	Note
Hidden Youth: Speculative Fiction from the Margins of History	Crossed Genres Publications	2016	ISBN 9780991392124	Editor (with Chesya Burke)
Amazons, Abolitionists, and Activists: A Graphic History of Women's Fight for Their Rights	Ten Speed Press	2019	ISBN 9780399581793	illustrated by A. D'Amico
Hood Feminism: Notes From the Women That a Movement Forgot	Viking Press	2020	ISBN 9780525560548	

=== Recent essays ===
Title	Publication	Date	Note
When Black Girls Hear That ‘Our Bodies Are All Wrong’	The New York Times	February 21, 2020	
Feminism Claims to Represent All Women. So Why Does It Ignore So Many of Them?	Time	February 24, 2020	
The Neoliberal Misunderstanding of Black Education	Literary Hub	February 27, 2020	
