= Chicago Review of Books =

Literary publication

- Website type: Literature, writing, reviews, interviews
- Available in: English
- Headquarters: Chicago
- Owner: StoryStudio Chicago
- Founder: Adam Morgan
- Editor: Michael Welch
- Website: https://chireviewofbooks.com/
- Launched: 2016

The Chicago Review of Books is an online literary publication of StoryStudio Chicago that reviews recent books covering diverse genres, presses, voices, and media. The magazine was started in 2016 by founding editor Adam Morgan. It is considered a sister publication of Arcturus, which publishes original fiction, non-fiction, and poetry.

After Morgan stepped down, the Chicago Review of Books was led by Editor-in-Chief Amy Brady. It is currently led by Editor-In-Chief Michael Welch.

== Content ==
The Chicago Review of Books publishes regular reviews and interviews from authors publishing across independent and large publishers, as well as book lists, feature essays, and podcasts. With an international audience and editorial scope, the magazine is also dedicated to shining a light on Chicago's literary scene and serving as a forum for literature in the Midwest.

== The Chicago Review of Books Awards ==
Since 2016, the Chicago Review of Books Awards have honored exemplary works of fiction, nonfiction, poetry, and essays & short stories published by authors from the Chicagoland literary community. The awards are voted on by a committee of Chicago booksellers and Chicago Review of Books staff, and past winners have included authors such as Rebecca Makkai, Eve L. Ewing, Mikki Kendall, Erika L. Sánchez, and more.

The Chicago Review of Books also introduced the Adam Morgan Literary Leadership Award to the annual awards ceremony in 2019. Named after the magazine's founding editor Adam Morgan, the award honors individuals for their contributions to the Chicago literary community through service, advocacy, and stewardship.

=== Past Winners ===
==== Fiction ====
- 2025 – The El by Theodore C. Van Alst Jr.
- 2024 – Hot Springs Drive by Lindsay Hunter
- 2023 – Bliss Montage: Stories by Ling Ma
- 2022 – The School For Good Mothers by Jessamine Chan
- 2021 – The Upstairs House by Julia Fine
- 2020 – The Lost Book of Adana Moreau by Michael Zapata
- 2019 – False Bingo by Jac Jemc
- 2018 – The Great Believers by Rebecca Makkai
- 2017 – How to Behave in a Crowd by Camille Bordas
- 2016 – The Lightkeepers by Abby Geni

==== Nonfiction ====
- 2025 – Original Sins: The [Mis]education of Black and Native Children and the Construction of American Racsim by Eve L. Ewing
- 2024 – The Night Parade by Jami Nakamura Lin
- 2023 – King: A Life by Jonathan Eig
- 2022 – Crying in the Bathroom: A Memoir by Erika L. Sánchez
- 2021 – Three Girls from Bronzeville: A Uniquely American Memoir of Race, Fate, and Sisterhood by Dawn Turner
- 2020 – Hood Feminism: Notes from the Women That a Movement Forgot by Mikki Kendall
- 2019 – Burn the Place by Iliana Regan
- 2018 – Ghosts in the Schoolyard: Racism and School Closings on Chicago’s South Side by Eve L. Ewing
- 2017 – The Wrong Way to Save Your Life by Megan Stielstra
- 2016 – The South Side by Natalie Y. Moore

==== Poetry ====
- 2025 – Hardly Creatures by Rob Macaisa Colgate
- 2024 – The Murmuring Grief of the Americas by Daniel Borzutsky
- 2023 – I Done Clicked My Heels Three Times by Taylor Byas
- 2022 – Against Heaven by Kemi Alabi
- 2021 – Wolf Lamb Bomb by Aviya Kushner
- 2020 – Too Much Midnight by Krista Franklin
- 2019 – 1919 by Eve L. Ewing
- 2018 – Citizen Illegal by José Olivarez
- 2017 – Electric Archces by Eve L. Ewing
- 2016 – child in a winter house brightening by Abigail Zimmer

==== Essay/Short Story ====
- 2025 – “A Trans Migrant Came to Chicago to Escape Violence. Now She's Afraid of Deportation” by Adriana Cardona-Maguigad in WBEZ Chicago
- 2024 – “After 25 years of selling tamales in Chicago, an undocumented immigrant mother returns to Mexico without her family” by Laura Rodríguez Presa in Chiacago Tribune
- 2023 – “After the Buses: Meet the Migrants at the Center of Texas’ Manufactured Crisis” by Madison Savedra in Block Club Chicago & Borderless Magazine
- 2022 – “It’s quiet around here until it’s not” by Salem Collo-Julin in Chicago Reader
- 2021 – “The climate crisis haunts Chicago’s future. A Battle Between a Great City and a Great Lake” by Dan Egan in The New York Times
- 2020 – “When reporting on movement actions, revolutionary joy must be given the same space as the struggle” by Matt Harvey in The TRiiBE
- 2019 – “An Axe for the Frozen Sea” by Megan Stielstra in Believer Magazine
- 2018 – “After Unthinkable Loss” by Sarah Conway, photos by Sebastián Hidalgo in City Bureau / Chicago Magazine
