= Whoever Was Using This Bed =

- Theatrical release poster
- Directed by: Andrew Kotatko
- Written by: Andrew Kotatko
- Based on: "Whoever Was Using This Bed" by Raymond Carver
- Produced by: Andrew Kotatko; Marie Slaight
- Starring: Jean-Marc Barr; Radha Mitchell; Jane Birkin
- Cinematography: Geoffrey Simpson, ACS
- Edited by: Roland Gallois, ASE
- Music by: Ben Frost; Jon Hopkins; Robert Mackenzie
- Production companies: Midnight Coffee Films; Altaire Productions
- Release date: 13 January 2016 (Flickerfest International Short Film Festival)
- Running time: 21 minutes
- Country: Australia
- Language: English

Whoever Was Using This Bed is a 2016 Australian short film directed by Andrew Kotatko. It is based on the short story of the same name by Raymond Carver from his 1988 collection Elephant. The film stars Jean-Marc Barr, Radha Mitchell and features the voice of Jane Birkin.

The film was co-produced by Altaire Productions and Midnight Coffee Films, with post-production funds successfully raised via crowdfunding on Kickstarter.

Whoever Was Using This Bed won Best Drama in the Australian Film Institute / Australian Academy of Cinema and Television Arts's 2016 Social Shorts competition.

It is Kotatko's second adaptation of Carver's writing, the first being Everything Goes starring Hugo Weaving, Abbie Cornish and Sullivan Stapleton.

== Synopsis ==
A married couple (Barr and Mitchell) is woken in the dead of night by a mysterious phone caller (Birkin). Unable to sleep, the couple are drawn into an unsettling examination of their darkest fears and desires.

== Cast ==
- Jean-Marc Barr as Ray
- Radha Mitchell as Iris
- Jane Birkin as The Caller

== Release ==
The film had its Australian premiere at the 25th Flickerfest International Short Film Festival. It was nominated for Best Australian Short Film.

== Background ==
In an interview about Whoever Was Using This Bed in The Brag Magazine, Kotatko said: "People who've seen the film have told me that it plays like an intimate American drama from the '70s, but there's definitely a visual quality to the film that evokes classic film noir. I think it also has an emotionally unnerving and suspenseful quality to it. It feels a bit like a thriller."

Radha Mitchell expressed her reasons for doing the project in The Beast Magazine: "I wouldn't normally be attracted to do a short film, except this is such a character piece, and it's so dependent on the two lead performances. It's sophisticated, and in a sense, it's very adult. Not in an x-rated sense, but thematically it's mature, and that was of interest to me."

Jean-Marc Barr shared his thoughts on the film's story in an interview for Filmink Magazine: "There's something very human about Carver's short stories and daily happenings that I think every couple has maybe gone through this. He [Kotatko] was able to leave it as open and as modern as possible but also give it his own kind of spices and wishes. The characters are really well built, especially in the writing and I think they leave a really big range for interpretation."

== Critical reception ==
Matthew Lowe of Filmink Magazine gave the film 18 out of 20, noting that "Whoever Was Using This Bed is an impeccably well-made short film, deeply melancholic and enriched by its superb performances".

US film critic Jeffrey M. Anderson of Combustible Celluloid gave the film 3 and a half out of 4 and observed that "Whoever Was Using This Bed occupies a state of sad, inescapable truth. To my eyes, Kotatko comes the closest of any filmmaker to capturing Carver on film."

In his review, ABC Radio's Movieland critic CJ Johnson wrote that "Whoever Was Using This Bed is an intelligent, precise and mature short film that doesn't rely on Carver's innate abilities; in transposing this gripping little two-hander to the screen, Kokatko makes plenty of cinematic choices of his own, informed by his obvious deep regard for the source material."
