= Beginners (short story collection) =

2009 short story collection by Raymond Carver

- First edition cover
- Editors: William L. Stull; Maureen P. Carroll
- Author: Raymond Carver
- Original title: Beginners: the original version of What We Talk About When We Talk About Love
- Language: English
- Genre: Short stories
- Publisher: Jonathan Cape
- Publication date: 2009
- Publication place: England
- Media type: Print (hardback & paperback)
- Pages: 212
- ISBN: 9780224089296
- OCLC: 799539673

Beginners is a short story collection by Raymond Carver. It was his original title for his first collection, which was published, after significant edits by Gordon Lish, as What We Talk About When We Talk About Love (1981). Carver's original version of the collection, under his original title, was published in 2009, after his death.

== Publishing history ==
The stories in Beginners were heavily edited by Gordon Lish before publication as What We Talk About When We Talk About Love. His edits included cutting up to 78% of some stories, retitling stories, changing endings, and renaming characters. The resulting collection was 50% shorter.

Carver was initially horrified by Lish's edits, and wrote to Lish in 1980 attempting to halt production of the collection in Lish's version, saying that "if the book were to be published as it is in its present edited form, I may never write another story". However, a week later, he wrote that he was "thrilled about the book and its impending publication". The book went ahead in its edited form.

In the final selection of his stories made during his lifetime, Where I'm Calling From: New and Selected Stories (1988), Carver included three of his original versions of the stories, in place of Lish's versions, but he also included eight of Lish's versions.

After his death, with the support of his widow Tess Gallagher, Carver's original version of the whole collection was included in the 2009 Collected Stories, alongside Lish's version of the collection.

Carver's original version was published as a separate volume, under its original title Beginners, in 2009.

== Reception ==
In an article largely critical of the decision to publish the original version of Beginners, The New York Review of Books said bluntly that "the book isn't very good". It found that the publication of the originals "has not done Carver any favors. Rather, it has inadvertently pointed up the editorial genius of Gordon Lish."

In The Guardian, Blake Morrison found more to admire in Carver's originals. He cites examples where Lish's edits have improved on the original but also examples where they have had the opposite effect. He compares Carver's "A Small Good Thing" with Lish's version, "The Bath", which "is feeble in comparison; the story barely gets going before he shuts it down." He concludes that "The true Carver, we now see, is gentler, fleshier, less brutal than Lish's Carver."

== Contents ==
- "Why Don't You Dance?"
- "Viewfinder"
- "Where is Everyone?"
- "Gazebo"
- "Want to See Something?"
- "The Fling"
- "A Small, Good Thing"
- "Tell the Women We're Going"
- "If It Please You"
- "So Much Water So Close to Home"
- "Dummy"
- "Pie"
- "The Calm"
- "Mine"
- "Distance"
- "Beginners"
- "One More Thing"

== Publications ==
- Carver, Raymond. Beginners. London: Chatto Bodley Head & Cape (2009)
- Carver, Raymond. Collected Stories. New York: Library of America (2009).
- Carver, Raymond. Beginners. New York: Vintage Contemporaries (2015)
