= Birdman (film) =

2014 film by Alejandro G. Iñárritu

- Theatrical release poster
- Directed by: Alejandro G. Iñárritu
- Written by: Alejandro G. Iñárritu; Nicolás Giacobone; Alexander Dinelaris Jr.; Armando Bó
- Produced by: Alejandro G. Iñárritu; John Lesher; Arnon Milchan; James W. Skotchdopole
- Starring: Michael Keaton; Zach Galifianakis; Edward Norton; Andrea Riseborough; Amy Ryan; Emma Stone; Naomi Watts
- Cinematography: Emmanuel Lubezki
- Edited by: Douglas Crise; Stephen Mirrione
- Music by: Antonio Sánchez
- Production companies: Regency Enterprises; New Regency; M Productions; Le Grisbi Productions; Worldview Entertainment
- Distributed by: Fox Searchlight Pictures
- Release dates: August 27, 2014 (Venice); October 17, 2014 (United States)
- Running time: 119 minutes
- Country: United States
- Language: English
- Budget: $16.5–18 million
- Box office: $103.2 million

Birdman, stylized as BiRDMAN or (The Unexpected Virtue of Ignorance), is a 2014 American satirical comedy-drama film directed by Alejandro González Iñárritu. The film stars Michael Keaton as a faded Hollywood actor, best known for playing a superhero named Birdman, and follows the struggles he faces while trying to make a comeback by writing, directing, and starring in a Broadway adaptation of Raymond Carver's short story "What We Talk About When We Talk About Love". The film's supporting cast includes Zach Galifianakis, Edward Norton, Andrea Riseborough, Amy Ryan, Emma Stone, and Naomi Watts.

With a brief exception, Birdman is presented as though it was filmed in one continuous take, an idea Iñárritu had from the film's conception. Cinematographer Emmanuel Lubezki believed that the recording time necessary for the long take approach could not have been made with older technology. The film was shot in New York City during the spring of 2013 with a budget of $16.5 million, jointly financed by Fox Searchlight Pictures, Regency Enterprises, and Worldview Entertainment.

Birdman premiered at the 71st Venice International Film Festival on August 27, 2014, receiving a limited theatrical release in the United States on October 17, followed by a wide release on November 14. Grossing more than $103 million worldwide, the film received critical acclaim, with praise for its screenplay, direction, cinematography, and the performances of the cast (particularly Keaton, Norton, and Stone). At the 87th Academy Awards it won Best Picture, Best Director, Best Original Screenplay, and Best Cinematography from a total of nine nominations, tying it with The Grand Budapest Hotel for the most nominated and awarded film at that year's ceremony. It also won Outstanding Cast in a Motion Picture at the 21st Screen Actors Guild Awards, as well as Best Actor in a Musical or Comedy for Keaton and Best Screenplay at the 72nd Golden Globe Awards.

== Plot ==
Riggan Thomson is a faded actor famous for playing a superhero named Birdman in a film trilogy from 1989 to 1992. He is tormented by the mocking and critical internal voice of his past self as Birdman and is frequently shown performing feats of levitation and telekinesis. Riggan is trying to regain recognition by writing, directing, and starring in a Broadway adaptation of Raymond Carver's short story "What We Talk About When We Talk About Love". However, the Birdman voice wants Riggan to return to blockbuster cinema and insists that he is essential to Riggan's identity.

Riggan's best friend and lawyer Jake is producing the play, which co-stars Riggan's girlfriend Laura and Broadway newcomer Lesley. Riggan's daughter Sam, a recovering drug addict with whom he is trying to reconnect, works as his assistant. A light fixture falls onto Riggan's hapless co-star Ralph the day before the first preview. At Lesley's suggestion, Riggan replaces Ralph with her boyfriend, the brilliant but volatile and self-absorbed method actor Mike Shiner.

The first previews are disastrous: Mike breaks character over replacing his gin with water, attempts to rape Lesley during a sex scene, and complains that the prop gun does not look natural. When Riggan berates Sam after finding her smoking marijuana, she insultingly rebukes and chastises him, telling him that he is irrelevant and the play is for his own vanity. Riggan clashes continually with Mike, culminating in a brawl after Riggan reads a New York Times interview with Mike in which he steals Riggan's personal reason for doing a Raymond Carver play. Jake persuades Riggan to continue with the play.

During the final preview, after seeing Mike and Sam kissing backstage, Riggan goes for a smoke and accidentally locks himself outside with his robe stuck in the fire escape door. He is forced to walk through Times Square in his briefs and enter through the audience to begin the final scene. A concerned Sam is waiting in his dressing room after the show, and she thinks the performance was very unusual but interesting. She shows him that the Times Square footage is going viral and explains how this actually helps him.

Riggan goes to a bar for a drink and approaches Tabitha Dickinson, a cynical and highly influential theater critic. She reveals her hatred for him and promises to "kill" his play with a deprecating review without seeing it. On the way back, Riggan buys a pint of whiskey, drinks it, and passes out on a stoop. The next day, walking to the theater with a severe hangover, he visualizes Birdman trying to convince him to abandon the play and make a fourth Birdman film. Riggan then imagines himself flying through the streets of Manhattan before arriving at the theater.

On opening night, the play goes very well. In his dressing room, a strangely calm Riggan confesses to his ex-wife, Sylvia, that several years ago, he attempted to drown himself in the ocean after she caught him having an affair. He also tells her about the Birdman voice, which she ignores. After Sylvia leaves, Riggan picks up a real gun for the final scene in which his character commits suicide. At the climax, Riggan shoots himself seemingly through the head on stage. The play receives a standing ovation.

Riggan wakes up in a hospital and learns he merely shot off his nose, which has been surgically reconstructed. Tabitha has published a glowing review of the play, mistaking the suicide attempt for a new acting technique. Sam visits with flowers and takes a picture of him to share with the skyrocketing number of followers on the Twitter account she has created for him. While she steps outside to find a vase, Riggan goes into the bathroom, removes the bandages revealing his swollen new nose, and says goodbye to Birdman. Fascinated by the birds flying outside his room, he opens the window, peers up at them, and then climbs out onto the ledge. Sam returns to an empty room, frantically runs to the open window and scans the ground. Finding no sign of Riggan, she hears a bird's cry, slowly looks up into the sky and smiles at what she sees.

== Cast ==
- Michael Keaton as Riggan
  - Benjamin Kanes as young Riggan / Birdman
- Zach Galifianakis as Jake
- Edward Norton as Mike
- Andrea Riseborough as Laura
- Amy Ryan as Sylvia
- Emma Stone as Sam
- Naomi Watts as Lesley
- Lindsay Duncan as Tabitha
- Merritt Wever as Annie
- Jeremy Shamos as Ralph
- Bill Camp as Crazy Man
- Damian Young as Gabriel
- Michael Siberry as Larry
- Clark Middleton as Sydney
- Natalie Gold as Clara
- Paula Pell as Lady in Bar
- David Fierro as Man in Bar
- Donna Lynne Champlin as Broadway Lady
- Craig Grant as Broadway Man on Street
- Jackie Hoffman as Lady on Balcony (Mary)
- Susan Blackwell as Intermission Woman
- Stephen Adly Guirgis as Good Neighbor

== Production ==
=== Development ===
Birdman director Alejandro G. Iñárritu originally conceived the film as a comedy filmed in a single shot set in a theatre. The original choice behind the film's genre, which was subsequently re-adapted to concentrate on Riggan's final emotional tailspin, came from the director wanting to see a change in his approach. All his previous films were dramas, and after directing Biutiful, he did not want to approach his new film in the same tragic manner again. The decision to make the film appear as a single shot came from his realization that "we live our lives with no editing". By presenting the film as a continuous shot, he could "submerge the protagonist in an 'inescapable reality' and take the audience with him". Iñárritu shared his idea with the Argentine screenwriters/cousins Nicolás Giacobone and Armando Bo, as well as playwright Alexander Dinelaris Jr., who had all worked with him on Biutiful. (Note: Dinelaris contributed some of the first drafts, Bo and Giacobone co-wrote the film.) Their first reaction was to tell him the continuous-shot idea could not work. According to Dinelaris and Giacobone, "huge" and "important" people told him to not even try the project for the same reason. Iñárritu himself described the technique as "almost suicidal", worrying that it would be distracting, instead of immersive. Dinelaris later said that had they truly paused and considered the idea, they might have talked Iñárritu out of it.

The personal and vocational experiences of the four co-writers were central to writing the script. Dinelaris' exposure to Broadway shaped the depictions of rehearsals and events backstage, though he admitted exaggerating these. He also felt his background writing long scenes of dialogue helped since scenes in the film "were really more like play scenes". Iñárritu's own experiences influenced many of Birdman's themes. "What this film talks about, I have been through", Iñárritu recalled. "I have seen and experienced all of it; it's what I have been living through the last years of my life." Dinelaris described this aspect as "a laughing look at oneself", but said it had to be done in a comedic way; otherwise, "it would have been the most unbelievably self-absorbed look at the subject". Themes from Raymond Carver's short story "What We Talk About When We Talk About Love", which Riggan adapts for stage in the story, also influenced the script. Iñárritu wanted to find the connection between the themes in Riggan's story and those of Carver's. Because of this, it was important to the director that Carver's story be the subject of the play depicted within the film. Therefore, Iñárritu stated that his desire to use Carver's work was "terrifying" because the rights to using the Carver material were still subject to the possibility of being rejected during development of the film, but no issues arose. Carver's widow, writer Tess Gallagher, loved the script and permitted the adaptation, saying that Carver would be laughing about the film.

While some aspects of the film – the first frame with Riggan, for instance – went unchanged from Birdman's conception to release, others went through several iterations. One of these was the sequence in which alter ego Birdman takes complete control over Riggan's thoughts. The writers knew it would occur at Riggan's lowest point, so at one stage planned for it to happen after Riggan hears the initial negative press coverage and destroys his dressing room. In another discarded version, Riggan tries to drown himself in Central Park and flies out to save himself.

The film's ending also changed, the final version being written halfway through filming. The original intended to depict Johnny Depp in Riggan's dressing room with a Pirates of the Caribbean poster in the back. Iñárritu grew to strongly dislike this ending, calling it "so embarrassing", and rewrote it with Dinelaris and Giacobone after a new ending came to him in a dream. Iñárritu was reluctant to describe the original ending, but it was leaked by Dinelaris. He said the original ending was set in the theatre, instead of the hospital, and involved Depp putting on Riggan Thomson's wig, and in Jack Sparrow's voice, "... the poster asks Depp, 'What the fuck are we doing here, mate?', and it was going to be the satire of the endless loop of that." The director and co-authors ruled out the satirical ending, and favored the new, more ambiguous, ending.

The project of co-writing was expedited by the collaboration between the four co-writers on the internet working from different geographical locations. With Iñárritu in Los Angeles, Giacobone and Bo in Buenos Aires, and Dinelaris in New York, the script was mainly written through Skype calls and emails. Although this complicated the writing process, Dinelaris said he believed the best ideas in Birdman came from Skype sessions at two in the morning where he and Giacobone were "cracking each other up". Incorporating the one-shot feature also affected the writing. Bo said: "We wrote everything thinking of this one shot, and a lot of decisions that would mostly be taken in the editing room were taken before shooting". The one-shot approach meant the scenes could not be removed or re-ordered in post-production, so the writers needed to be "very, very sure about what was on the page". As a result, it took about a year and a half to complete the final draft. As Dinelaris summarized, "You have to be an idiot to do it all in one shot. You have to be an idiot to attempt it. It takes a great, great deal of ignorance to not pay attention to the difficulties and to think you're going to do this. Birdman looks like a good idea now, but [at the time of production] we did not know how we would land."

=== Casting ===
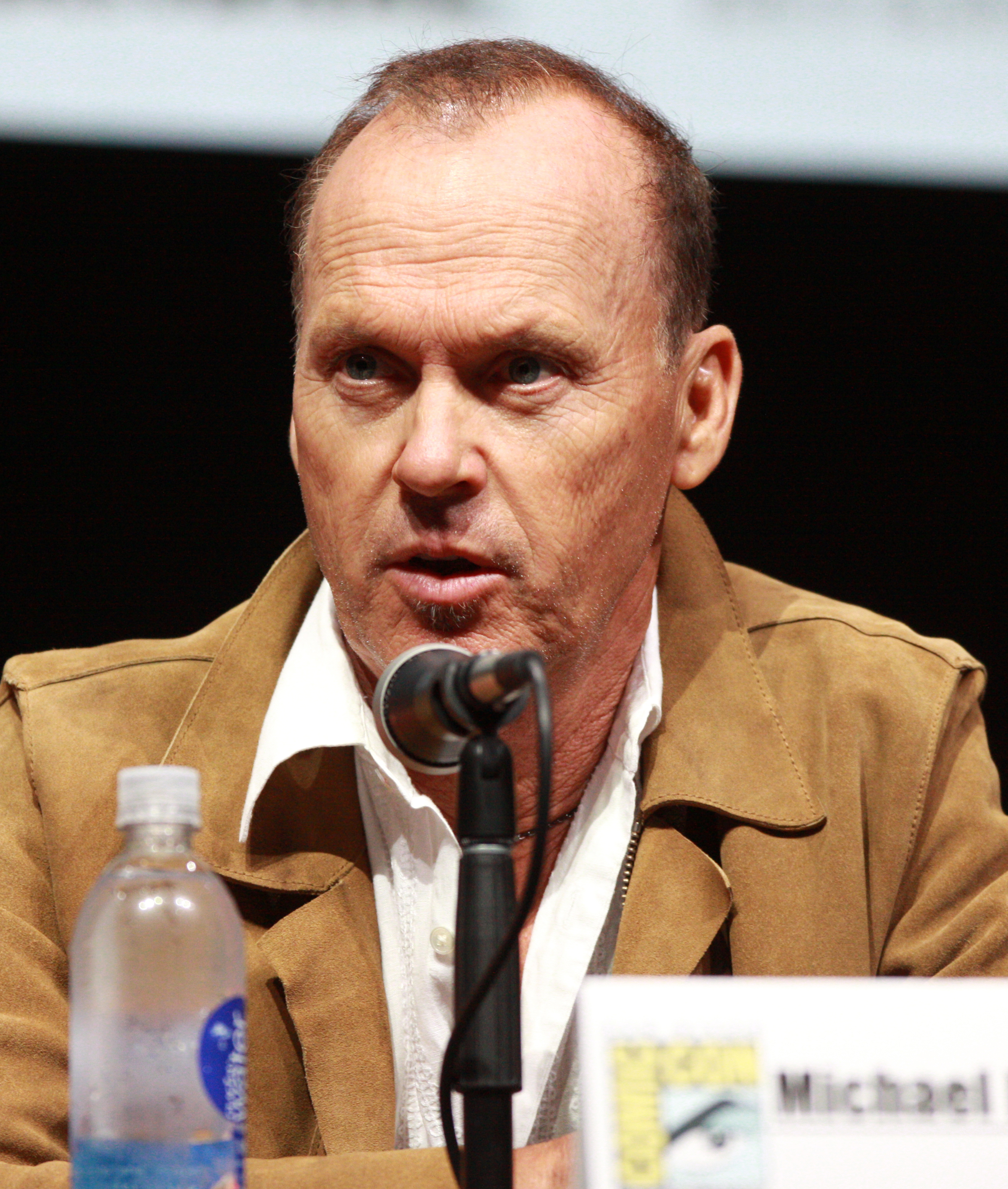
Michael Keaton was Iñárritu's first choice to play Riggan Thomson.

Iñárritu cast several of the leading roles before the film was financed. Among these was the lead role. Early in script development, Iñárritu did not have Michael Keaton in mind, but he had changed his mind by the end: "When I finished the script, I knew that Michael was not the choice or option, he was the guy". Iñárritu cast Keaton for his depth in a variety of acting styles: He could handle the demands of the stage, up-close work, and comedy and empathy "with a profound depth to both".

Keaton knew about Birdman before Iñárritu contacted him. He was in the middle of production of another project when he learned that Iñárritu was making another film. Keaton, a fan of his work, flew home to find out more. Iñárritu sent him the script and they discussed it over dinner. The first thing Keaton asked Iñárritu was whether he was making fun of him (regarding his role in Tim Burton's Batman films), but after Iñárritu explained the role, its technicalities, and the film's production, Keaton agreed to play Riggan. Despite this, the final film contains numerous references to Burton's Batman films, including the year Riggan is mentioned to have last played Birdman being 1992.

Iñárritu called his decision behind casting Zach Galifianakis as Jake "a bet". Galifianakis met Iñárritu's criteria of being lovable and funny, but Iñárritu also considered him sensitive, which scored him the role. Emma Stone already knew she wanted to work with Iñárritu before she was offered the role of Sam. The script that Iñárritu gave her and the rest of the cast came with the photo Man on Wire, which featured Philippe Petit crossing the Twin Towers on a tightrope. Iñárritu told the cast, "We are doing that".

Once these actors were committed, Iñárritu sought funding. He first invited Fox Searchlight Pictures to finance the project, but they turned his offer down because they felt his asking budget was too high. At one stage Megan Ellison of Annapurna Pictures wanted to be involved in the project, but decided against it because, unlike her other films, she had not been involved since the beginning. Iñárritu approached Brad Weston, president of New Regency, who accepted the offer. When executive Claudia Lewis of Searchlight heard about the deal, she reconsidered and asked to be included in the deal. Searchlight and New Regency had previously worked together to finance 12 Years a Slave, and they decided to join for Birdman, financing a budget of $16.5 million.

Weston and Lewis developed a close relationship with Iñárritu, editing the script with him and switching some of the actors. When they joined production, Josh Brolin was set to play the role of Mike Shiner, but the financiers decided to switch him for Norton because of scheduling conflicts.

He said Norton's experience as a theatre actor, combined with his self-confidence, meant that "in a way, there was some kind of mental reality to Edward", but Norton believes he was the one who convinced Iñárritu to take him on. Norton was a fan of the director's work and impressed with his ability to push outside film-making boundaries. Norton heard about Iñárritu's project from a friend. Once he got the script, he read it straight through until 3:00 am. Norton said, "I laughed so hard I woke people up." Norton wanted to meet Iñárritu the next day, and once they met, Norton told him he could not cast someone who was the "embodiment" of what the script was taking aim at. Instead, the director needed to cast someone "who has at least a little bit of authentic depth of experience, in this world". Iñárritu agreed.

Amy Ryan, one of the last actors to be cast, was invited because Iñárritu had seen her in the play Detroit. Lindsay Duncan had vast experience in the theatre world too, and decided to accept the offer to play the critic because of the quality of the script. "It's delicious because of the writing." But like Shiner's character, Iñárritu found casting Laura difficult. Riseborough met him on a street corner for a cup of tea, and recalling the event, said, "I told him that I would crawl across hot coals to work with him". Iñárritu described Laura as "a very wacky, quirky role", but said, "when [Andrea Riseborough] did it, I knew that it was her, because she did it right in the tone, and she understood who she was – she was not judging".

=== Rehearsal and filming ===
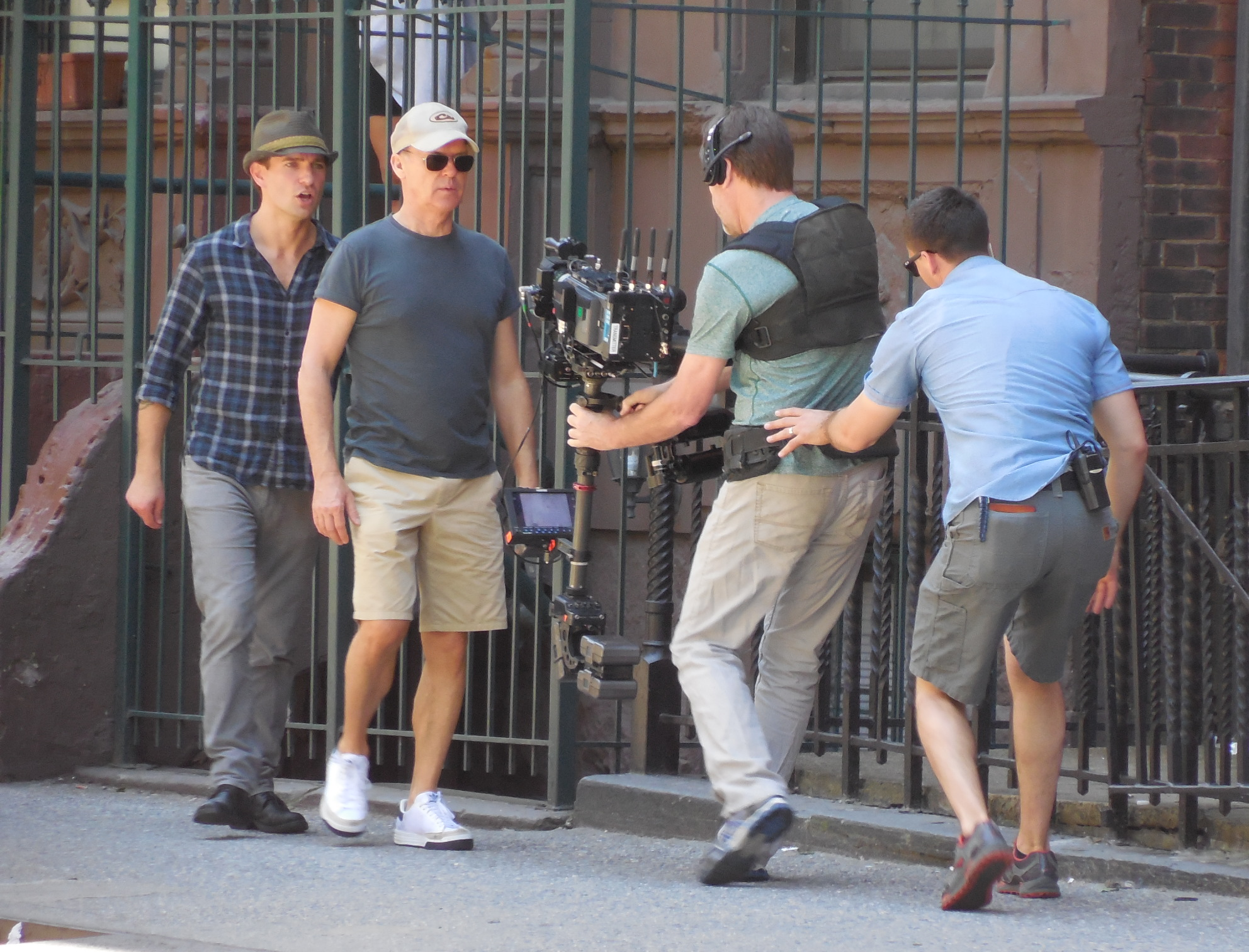
Michael Keaton rehearsing an action-sequence of the film

Once the writing was finished, Iñárritu contacted friend and cinematographer Emmanuel Lubezki to discuss his idea for the film. After reading the script, Lubezki was worried that Iñárritu would offer him the job since Birdman "had all of the elements of a movie that I did not want to do at all" – comedy, studio work and long takes – but changed his mind after further discussion with the director. The pair had worked together on commercials and a short film in the anthology To Each His Own Cinema, but not on any feature films. Lubezki wanted to be sure that this was a decision Rodrigo Prieto, cinematographer of all four of Iñárritu's feature films, was comfortable with, but after receiving his blessing, the two headed into pre-production.

Lubezki was concerned that no film had been shot in the way Iñárritu envisioned, meaning there would be no reference material to look up. The two decided the only way to learn how to shoot it would be to shoot it themselves, so they built a proxy stage at Sony Studios in Los Angeles. The setup was minimal. Canvas and C-stands were used for walls, while tape and a few pieces of furniture marked out areas. Using a camera and some stand-ins, the duo worked through the movie to see if it was possible. Realizing no theatre could accommodate the intricate camerawork they needed, they hired Kaufman Astoria Studios in New York. Still, Iñárritu wanted to shoot at a Broadway theater, but would have to wait until several weeks into rehearsals before securing St. James Theatre. They then spent a few months designing and making "blueprints" of the shots and blocking the scenes, using the stand-ins to read and walk through the script. The planning was precise. Iñárritu said: "There was no room to improvise at all. Every movement, every line, every door opening, absolutely everything was rehearsed." The actors started rehearsing once this preliminary work was completed: According to Lubezki, they did the scenes with the actors "once we kind of knew what the rhythm of the scenes were". He described the atypical approach "like an upside down movie where you do post-production before the production".

I know Alejandro is very adamant about kind of keeping the rabbit in the hat and not being super specific about how it was shot, but I will say it took a lot of rehearsal and it was very specific... There was no luxury of cutting away or editing around anything. You knew that every scene was staying in the movie, and like theater, this was it, this was your chance to live this scene.

— Emma Stone

Editors Douglas Crise and Stephen Mirrione were involved in the project by this stage. When Iñárritu told Mirrione that he planned for Lubezki to record table readings and the rehearsals, he suggested they edit them immediately to discover what was and was not working early on. The editing also allowed the editors to discuss pacing issues with the director, such as the position of the night-day transitions and other moments of rest in the film. Production designer Kevin Thompson was on hand too, and mapped out the scenes. The camerawork required many elements of the set to be built in a certain way. For example, Riggan's makeup mirror and desk were constructed so that the camera would see his reflection. Thompson also took into consideration the needs of the crew, for instance designing the stairs a little wider for Steadicam operator Chris Haarhoff's footsize. He then constructed a template of the set they would build when in New York. The writers were also involved in the rehearsals, fine-tuning the script to "make sure the film was fluid and never stopped".

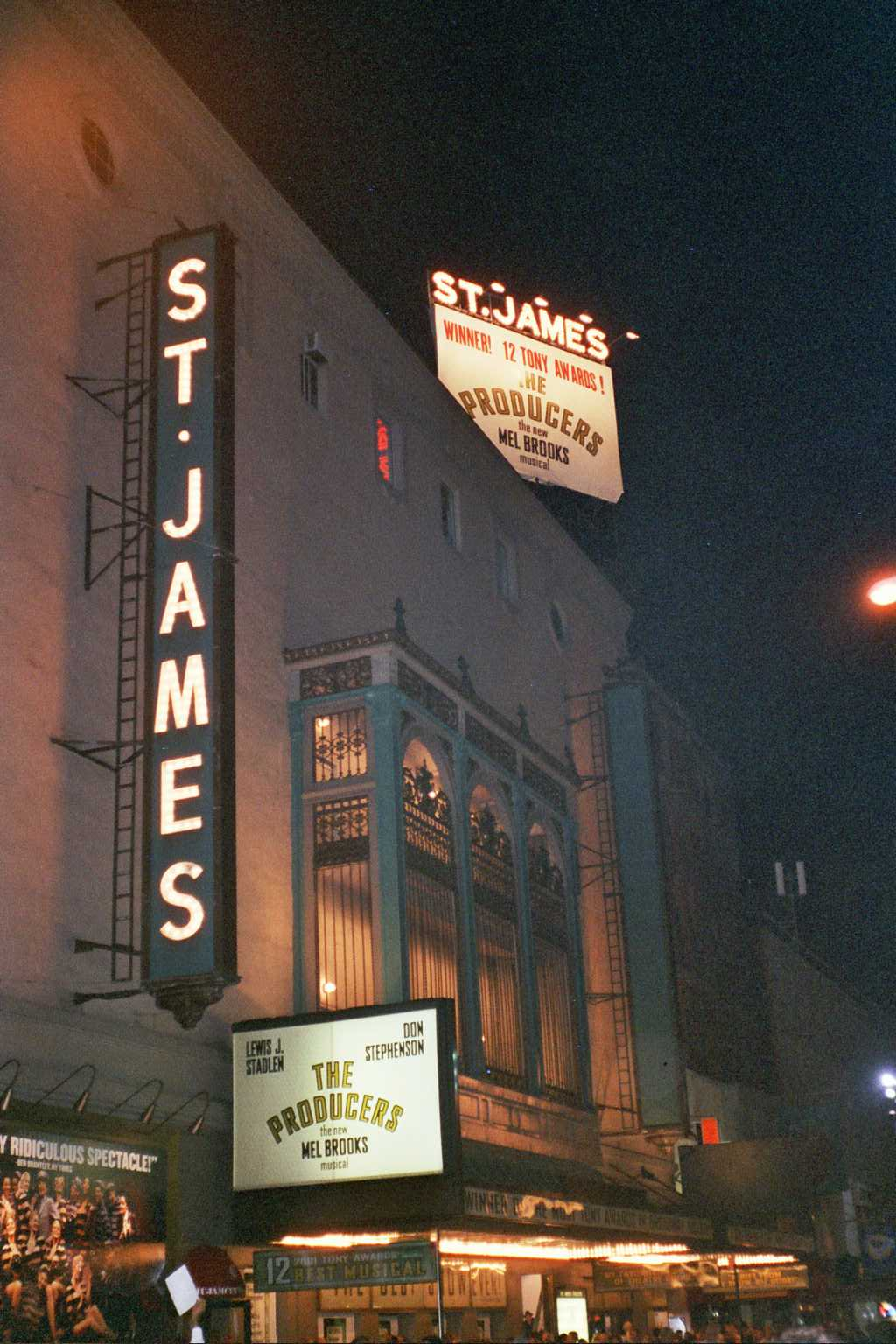

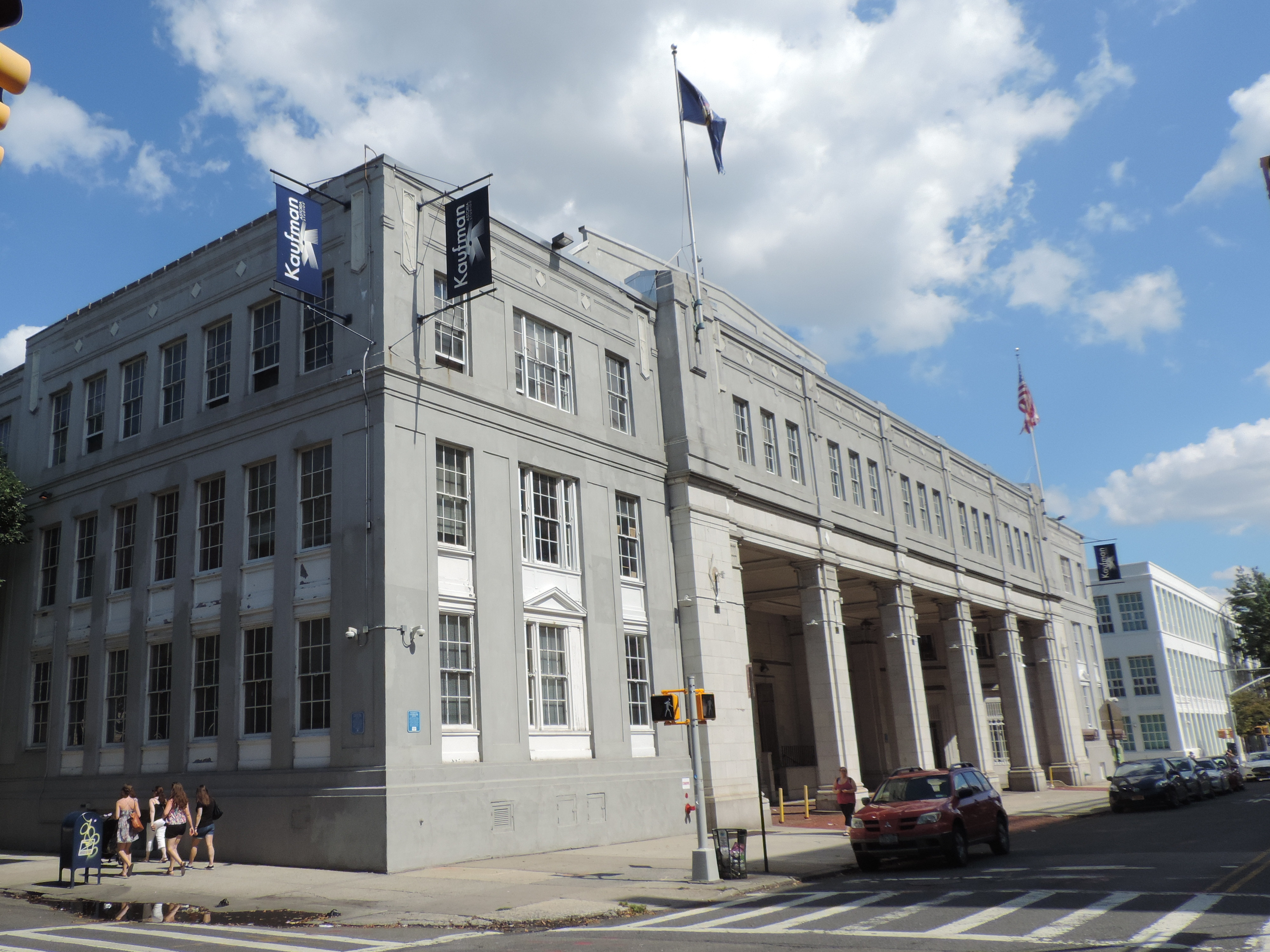
St. James Theatre and Kaufman Astoria Studios in New York were used to film the stage and backstage scenes of Birdman, respectively.

Once the logistics of the scenes were worked out and they had the timing down, the team headed to Kaufman Studios for more rehearsals, followed by principal photography based exclusively in New York during the spring of 2013. The studios were used to film the backstage areas of the film, including Riggan's dressing room and the theatre corridors. St. James Theatre was used for two weeks; it was the location for the stage scenes. The bar segments were shot in The Rum House on 47th Street, and 43rd Street was used for the action-sequence. The film was unable to be shot chronologically because of scheduling with the theatre. Throughout the locations, including the studio, the scenes were lit with natural light, (Note: There was one exception, a 20K used to simulate daylight outside a window.) since Lubezki wanted the movie "to look as naturalistic as possible". The night-time scenes were possible to film in this way due to the brightness of New York. Lubezki found lighting the scenes to be the hardest part of his work on the film. Not only did the lighting need to look realistic, but also had to be designed so that the continuous movements of the camera did not project the crew's shadows onto the actors.

Throughout shooting, Arri Alexa cameras were used; an Alexa M was used for handheld sequences, and an Alexa XT was attached to the Steadicam. Neither used matte boxes, however. Steadicam operator Chris Haarhoff explained this decision: "We didn't want this big black thing gliding into their eyeline. This way we could get very close and get the light past the lens and onto the actor's face." Lubezki – who did all the handheld camerawork – had chosen the Alexa M because the camera was very small and allowed him to get into tiny spaces and close to the actors, sometimes filming two inches (5 cm) away from Keaton's face. The camera also allowed recording for such a long period – necessary for the long takes of the movie – that Lubezki went so far as to say the movie would have been impossible to do years before. The cameras were lensed with Leica Summilux-C or Zeiss Master Primes. Lubezki stated that these gave clean images, saying "You can have all these lights in the frame and they are not really causing bad flare or things like that". In terms of sizes, they initially trialled a 21mm, but this did not give Iñárritu the "intimacy" he wanted. The crew instead went to an 18mm Leica, which was used for the majority of the film. Only when emphasis was needed did they switch the lens to a 14mm, but this was rare.

Despite all the preparation, a typical shooting day would begin with rehearsals. These usually lasted most of the morning, after which photography followed. The meticulous timing for the scenes meant that takes were cancelled because of the slightest mishaps. Emma Stone, in an interview with Jimmy Fallon, recalled how a six-minute take of the scene where Riggan first meets Mike was ruined after she walked around a corner too quickly. Takes were also repeated if a scene's rhythm did not feel right to Iñárritu, or if he and Lubezki were not satisfied with a shot's framing. As shooting progressed, lines of dialog would also be dropped, giving Iñárritu more options during post-production. Because of this, the number of takes for a given scene was high, usually 20 for the shorter scenes, the takes running smoothly around the fifteenth. Chris Haarhoff described it as "a type of dance where everyone would hopefully try to peak all at the same moment". The locations sometimes placed restrictions on the takes too; the live Times Square sequence was shot only twice since they did not want to attract the attention of tourists.

Whenever shooting was taking place there was pressure on everyone involved, but the cast had a positive experience. Norton said that normally in movie production half the people can "check out" due to repetitive aspects, but during the shooting of Birdman, "everybody's on, the whole thing, and you're all on pins and needles because you're all relying on forty other people not to drop the ball". Because of this, Stone said the director was able to get the best out of the cast, saying Iñárritu's process "creates this sort of fury in you, and then you end up realizing that he just got so much out of you that you didn't even know you had". Naomi Watts commented that the atmosphere "felt emblematic of how it feels onstage – at least my long-time memories from long ago". Andrea Riseborough, meanwhile, described the process as "wonderful", mentioning how it was possible to hear the filming of a sequence from far away before the camera arrived, and then "the magic happens with you, and then everything leaves you, and everything's silent". Once they successfully completed a take though, it was obvious to everybody involved. Norton said: "I've never, ever been on a set where every day ended with an enormous, authentic sort of cheer at having made it. You're waiting for the scream from [Iñárritu], and everybody was genuinely excited."

=== Music and soundtrack ===
The film's original music segments are a drum score consisting entirely of solo jazz percussion performances by Antonio Sánchez. The score is offset by a number of well-known classical music pieces, including Mahler and Tchaikovsky. Iñárritu did not regard the particular choice of classical pieces as important. Nonetheless, the choice of classical music was strongly oriented to highly melodic scores taken predominantly from the 19th century classical repertoire (Mahler, Tchaikovsky, Rachmaninov, Ravel). Iñárritu stated that the classical components come from the world of the play, citing the radio in Riggan's room and the show itself as two sources of the music. The classical music segments also included two compositions by American composer John Adams. Several jazz compositions by Victor Hernández Stumpfhauser and Joan Valent counterbalance the original music composition by Sánchez. The drum sections comprise the majority of the score, however, and were composed by Sánchez. Iñárritu explained the choice by saying they helped to structure scenes, and that "The drums, for me, was a great way to find the rhythm of the film... In comedy, rhythm is king, and not having the tools of editing to determine time and space, I knew I needed something to help me find the internal rhythm of the film."

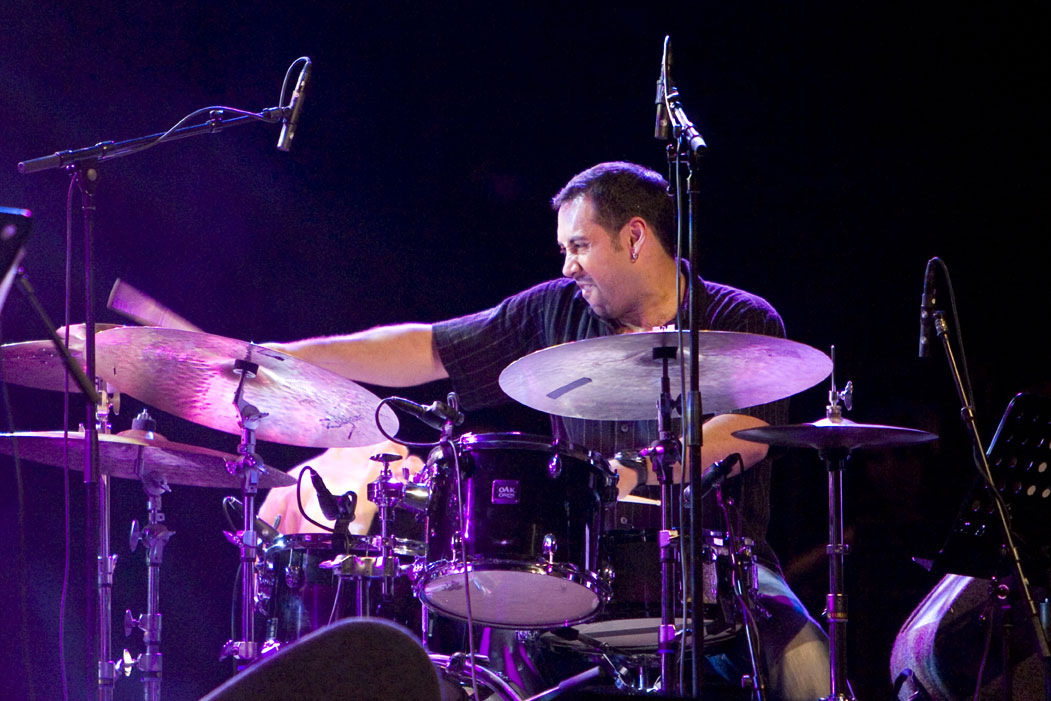
Jazz drummer Antonio Sánchez composed and recorded the score for the film.

Iñárritu contacted friend and jazz drummer Antonio Sánchez in January 2013, inviting him to compose the score for the film. His reaction to writing a soundtrack using only drums was similar to Lubezki's thoughts of shooting the movie like a single shot: "It was a scary proposition because I had no point of reference of how to achieve this. There's no other movie I know that has a score like this." Sánchez had also not worked on a film before, nevertheless, after receiving the script, he composed "rhythmic themes" for each of the characters. Iñárritu was looking for the opposite approach, however, preferring spontaneity and improvisation. Sánchez then waited until production moved to New York before composing more, where he visited the set for a couple of days to get a better idea of the film. Following this, a week before principal photography, he and Iñárritu went to a studio to record some demos. During these sessions the director would first talk him through the scene, then while Sánchez was improvising guide him by raising his hand to indicate an event – such as a character opening a door – or by describing the rhythm with verbal sounds. They recorded around seventy demos, which Iñárritu used to inform the pacing of the scenes on set, and once filming was complete, spliced them into the rough cut. Sánchez summarized the process by saying, "The movie fed on the drums, and the drums fed on the imagery". The official soundtrack was released as a CD (77 min) in October 2014, and as an LP (69 min) in April 2015. When the Academy of Motion Picture Arts and Sciences released their longlist for the Academy Award for Best Original Score in December 2014, Birdman or (The Unexpected Virtue of Ignorance) was absent from the list. The previous day, Sánchez received a note from the award committee explaining the decision, quoting rule fifteen of the 87th Academy Award Rules, noting "the fact that the film also contains over a half an hour of non-original (mostly classical) music cues that are featured very prominently in numerous pivotal moments in the film made it difficult for the committee to accept your submission". Sánchez launched an appeal, and along with Iñárritu and the executive vice-president of Fox Music, they sent letters to Charles Fox, the chair of the Academy's music branch executive committee, asking that the committee reconsider their decision. One of the points they raised was that the committee incorrectly calculated the ratio of classical to original music, which after being clarified Sánchez thought he was "on really solid ground". A response from Fox on December 19, however, explained that a special meeting of the music committee was held, and although its members had "great respect" for the score and considered it "superb", they thought that the classical music "was also used as scoring", "equally contributes to the effectiveness of the film", and that the musical identity of the film was created by both the drums and classical music. Ultimately, they did not overturn their decision. Sánchez said that he and Iñárritu were not satisfied with the explanation.

=== Post-production and visual effects ===
The film was edited by Douglas Crise and Stephen Mirrione, who had both worked with the director before on 21 Grams and Babel. Stitching shots together was a crucial component of the editing, but Crise and Mirrione already had experience doing this. The director had included takes that were joined in previous films, but in these if the editors did not think the stitching worked, they had the ability to introduce cuts. Mirrione said that in Birdman, Iñárritu had "let go of that safety net". Because of this the editors needed to be involved in the project early on, and during principal photography Crise was on set every day. (Mirrione was busy and unable to be in New York.) Crise was not used to being on set and providing feedback, but said he was happy Iñárritu "dragged it out" of him, knowing that they would not have much room to fix scenes later so they needed to get them right. For stitching, aside from the director, Crise also discussed strategies with Lubezki and Thompson, and techniques for gluing takes together included panning on walls and actors' bodies. The editors were used to being able to adjust the rhythm of a scene by the positioning of cuts, so without this tool used Sánchez's music instead. The director gave the New York recordings to Crise early on to help with pacing, asking him to cut the music to the film. Still, in terms of the editing workflow, Crise described it as "pretty traditional". The editors cut the film together back in Los Angeles. A few weeks after shooting, they were quite far along the cut itself, and transitioned into visual-effects mode, where they fine-tuned the shots.

They always talk about how when you're cutting a dance scene, a choreographer wouldn't want any cuts because she's designing something to see the whole movement, and that's what Alejandro was doing here.

— Stephen Mirrione

The visual effects for the film were created by Montreal based studio Rodeo FX. They spent four months working on the film, and according to visual effects supervisor Ara Khanikian "visual effects touched 90% of the frames in the movie". A lot of the work was subtle, such as stitching shots together, or creating the background for the windows in the hospital scene. Many shots in the film feature mirrors, and much work was spent removing the reflections of the crew from these. To accomplish this the studio created a 2.5D digital matte painting of the reflected environment. They then rotoscoped out the parts of the mirror not containing the foreground actors and their reflections, and replaced these with the digital environment. Some of the original shots captured smudges and dirt on the mirrors, so the studio developed a way to extract them so they could paste them back into the film. A matte-painting was constructed for the night-day time lapses in the film too, created by matchmoving and reprojecting shots of the buildings it features, captured at different times of the day, together. Rodeo FX also adjusted the pace of scenes. Iñárritu demanded a "very precise rhythm and flow" to the film, so the studio had to re-speed much of it with timewarp curves to fit the pacing the director desired.

Unlike some of the smaller adjustments though, the flying sequence required extensive preparation. Iñárritu spent three weeks with Halon Entertainment to previsualize the sequence. In New York, Lubezki then used the choreography of the previsualization to shoot background plates for the sequence, using a camera crane on a truck. When these were shot, Lubezki had mounted four GoPro cameras to the lens of the film camera to capture the light environment around him. Later, on a greenstage in Montreal, using a technique he had developed on Gravity, Lubezki lit Keaton with LED panels featuring high-dynamic-range images of the surrounding New York footage. The panels then realistically lit Keaton. Khanikian described the effect of the process, saying, "Instead of using standard lighting on greenscreen, [we were getting] the proper red bounce from the red bricks, and the same color of the sky reflected on Michael's head. It worked so well." Rodeo FX then completed the final shots. The sequence was the last piece the editors inserted into the film. Mirrione commented that before the sequence was finished, they "had only imagined what it was going to feel like", but once it was completed, "it took the movie to this ecstatic level that absolutely blew me away".

Sound design for the film was handled by Martín Hernández, who has worked on all the director's feature films. The production sound his team was given was "surprisingly perfect and clean", so they did not need to spend much time tidying it. The lack of visual cuts in the film meant a departure from the usual way Hernández edited sound though. "Normally, Alejandro likes, as he calls it, 'the clashing of the sounds'. The camera changes angle within the scene and there is a change of everything – backgrounds, texture, dialog. Obviously, that would not work on Birdman because here, everything is flowing." Additionally, the sound of objects in the film needed to be coordinated with their position onscreen, a non-trivial task, since the camera was nearly always moving. Hernández also helped to cut Sánchez's tracks, selecting and editing moments from the New York recordings against the film. When the tracks were re-recording in Los Angeles, in order "to have distance, and closeness and resonance" the team used thirty-two microphones for each take. Hernández described the job as "crazy". A large challenge of the post-production soundwork was designing the sound of the theatre audience, particularly in the scene when Mike is drunk and comes out of character. Iñárritu knew how he wanted the audience to respond, but figuring out the sound of their reaction took four months of work from five sound designers. Hernández said he thought, for a film in general, that the narrative created by sound "provokes more 'explosions'" than that created by images, and that in Birdman, "Alejandro has sound exploding all throughout the film".

The digital intermediate was completed by a team at Technicolor led by Steven Scott. They had previously collaborated with Lubezki on Gravity, but needed to approach Birdman differently because of the continuous-shot approach. According to Scott, "we have never done anything like it before". The color timing had to be done in such a way that the transitions between color-corrected environments were invisible, in contrast to a usual film where the transitions coincide with visible cuts. To do this, the team inserted their own cuts whenever the camera was stationary, and in the middle of pans and other camera movements. They then devised a way to color correct the stationary cuts and turn the moving cuts into a form of dissolve, allowing them to "do all these independent, crazy, complicated, color corrections that would flow organically from one to another". Inserting the dissolves required rotoscoping methods which the software Scott and his team were using did not have, but an enterprise agreement between Technicolor and the software's developer led to the creation of a tool Scott required. For the color timing itself, one of the priorities of the team was making the faces as dimensional and readable as possible. This required, amongst other things, that faces be highlighted, but the moving camerawork meant that the mattes used in this process had to be animated by hand. Lubezki would provide notes on the areas he wanted tracked, then the team would carry out the animations. Of the whole process, Iñárritu remarked that "everyone was out of their comfort zone", while Scott said it was the most challenging DI project of his career.

== Analysis and themes ==
Iñárritu has emphasized and defended the various ambiguities intentionally included in the film: "At the ending of the film, [it] can be interpreted as many ways as there are seats in the theater." Many aspects of film theory were debated concerning the film by critical reviews which included, among other subjects, (a) film genre; (b) intended and unresolved ambiguities of plot; and (c) the complex interaction of Riggan's personal life with his professional life as an actor. A short list of the diverse forms of film genre associated with the film has included it being referred to alternatively as a black-humor film, a mental health film, a realism/surrealism/magical realism film, a dark-humor parody film, a film of psychological realism, a failed domestic reconciliation drama, or a film concerning theatrical realism and naturalism. Iñárritu has maintained his penchant, well-known to followers of his previous films, for deliberately including multiple plot lines in this film which are intentionally left unresolved at the ending. Separate reviews in the press have also summarized the film as closely associated with the theme of the final tailspin of a late mid-life crisis in the life of a has-been actor seeking closure and resolution in his public and private life.

The father-daughter themes in the film, portrayed through the relationship of Riggan and Samantha, were the "most difficult" and important parts of the film to depict for co-writers Dinelaris and Giacobone, as they both had similar experiences within their families involving their own relationships with their daughters. When the writers were asked about the meaning of the ambiguous ending which the director refused to comment upon, they stated that any comedic ending was completely ruled out. The writers also stated that reflections about the conclusion to the film were not directly concentrated upon Riggan or the character of Birdman as much as upon the lives of the surviving characters portrayed in the film, in particular the portrayal of Riggan's daughter Samantha.

Noting the thematic pull between Riggan's insanity or actual superpowers, Travis LaCouter of First Things writes that "the importance of these powers – real or imagined – is apparent: They are for Riggan the thing beyond the labels, the kernel of his genius and, because he sees drawing upon them as selling out, the source of his great angst." LaCouter concludes that "the quirky profundity of this film is in how it dares the viewer to consider the everyday magic that we tend to ignore, repress, or resent".

Critics Barbara Schweizerhof and Matthew Pejkovici see the film's central theme as a satirical critique of contemporary theatrical realism, with Pejkovici comparing it favorably to Fellini's film 8½ (1963). As Pejkovici states: "Much like Fellini's 1960[sic] classic 8½, Iñárritu's Birdman is a very intimate film about an artist's malaise, yet is epic, innovative, and ambitious in approach. Iñárritu captures the artist's battle between ambition, admiration, and celebrity with stunning scope and skill in the form of a one-take format, as his camera sweeps through the backstage corridors, across the stage, out on the busy NYC streets, and back again in breathtaking fashion."

Thematically, Richard Brody also compared it to Opening Night (1977) by John Cassavetes. Brody said that the actors played in "the sort of modern naturalism, without eccentricity of gesture, excess of expression, or heightened and formalistic precision, that is the business-casual of contemporary cinema". The Wall Street Journal's Caryn James compared the story to that of Don Quixote (who believes himself to be a knight), as the main character believes he is a superhero (the equivalent to a knight in the 21st century). This relationship was also highlighted by the scholarly literature.

== Release and reception ==
Birdman was selected as the opening film of the 71st Venice International Film Festival along with Mohsen Makhmalbaf's new film. A limited release began in four North American theatres on October 17, 2014, followed by a nationwide release in 857 theatres on November 14, 2014.

=== Box office ===
Birdman grossed $42.3 million in North America and $60.9 million in other territories, for a worldwide total of $103.2 million, against a budget of about $17 million.

The film earned $424,397 during its limited North America opening in four theatres in New York and Los Angeles on the weekend of October 17, 2014, a per-theater average of $106,099, making it the 18th all-time earner (eighth among live-action movies) and ranking No. 20. In the second weekend of October 24, 2014, Birdman expanded to 50 theaters and earned $1.38 million, which translates to a $27,593 per-theater average. The film expanded nationwide to 857 theaters in the weekend of November 14, 2014, grossing $2,471,471, with a per theatre average of $2,884, and ranking No. 10. In the same weekend, Birdman grossed $11.6 million.

The film opened in Mexico on November 13, 2014, grossing $628,915 in its opening weekend, and opened in the United Kingdom on January 2, 2015, grossing $2,337,407 over the weekend. In the United Kingdom, Australia, and Italy, the film grossed $7.6 million, $3.97 million, and $1.97 million, respectively.

=== Critical response ===
On review aggregation website Rotten Tomatoes, Birdman holds an approval rating of 91%, based on 351 reviews, and an average rating of 8.50/10. The website's critical consensus reads: "A thrilling leap forward for director Alejandro González Iñárritu, Birdman is an ambitious technical showcase powered by a layered story and outstanding performances from Michael Keaton and Edward Norton." On Metacritic, the film received a weighted average score of 87 out of 100, based on 58 critics, indicating "universal acclaim". Audiences surveyed by CinemaScore gave the film an average grade of "A−" on an A+ to F scale. In 2015, the film was named as one of the top 50 films of the decade so far by The Guardian.

Margaret Pomeranz and David Stratton from At the Movies praised the film's writing, direction, performances and cinematography. Stratton also described the implementation of the percussion score as "really exciting", while Pomeranz summarised: "It's just really beautifully written and stunningly performed and beautifully made." The pair both gave the film five stars, making Birdman the only film to receive such a rating from the hosts in 2014. In The New York Times, Manohla Dargis compared the main character to Icarus, the Greek mythological figure who crashed to his death after flying too close to the sun. She also noted a reference to Susan Sontag's Against Interpretation in the dressing-room mirror.

Richard Kolker compared the film to both Alfred Hitchcock's Rope (1948) and Alexander Sokurov's Russian Ark (2002). Kolker concludes that Birdman is "a film about acting, identity, transformation, and the mysterious effects of superheroes, (and) is filmed to create the illusion of being made in one continuous take. As with Rope, the edits are hidden, and the result is a rhythmic slide through the life of an actor in search of his self, a search doomed from the start." Ollie Cochran called the film "an amalgam of technical prowess, hypnotising visuals and pragmatically perceptive dialogue", believing it to be "a thought-provoking, energetic perspective of a fading actor looking to revitalise his career."

International reception of the film was also at a high level of praise. In Germany, a film aggregate rating at EPD Film gave the film a 3.4 out of 5 rating, based on seven critiques. The German critic Barbara Schweizerhof gave the film a 4 out of 5 possible stars, complimenting the director's satirical virtuosity in making the film. In her review, Schweizerhof spoke of the film as inviting the viewer to re-watch it "a second and third time", and praised the technical achievement of representing a storyline depicting "the feverish stream of consciousness" of its main character throughout the film.

The camerawork, which depicts most of the film as one continuous take, was met with extensive acclaim for its execution and usage. The acting was widely praised, particularly Keaton's, with Peter Debruge of Variety calling the performance the "comeback of the century". Debruge described the film as "a self-aware showbiz satire", and called it "a triumph on every creative level". Robbie Collin of The Daily Telegraph rated the film 5/5 and gave particular praise to the use of long takes by Emmanuel Lubezki, director of photography. Richard Roeper gave the film an "A" and wrote that Keaton made a serious case for an Academy Award for Best Actor nomination (which Keaton later achieved).

Writing for The New Yorker, Richard Brody called the film "Godardian", comparing it to Pierrot le Fou (1965), Every Man for Himself (1980), Alphaville (1965), and Germany Year 90 Nine Zero (1991), four classic films by French director Jean-Luc Godard. However, he suggested the film fell short of reaching the same cinematic mastery, adding, "it's not a good idea for a filmmaker to get in the ring with Mr. Godard". In his critical comments on the film, he concluded that the film "trade[d] on facile, casual dichotomies of theatre versus cinema and art versus commerce" and "deliver[ed] a work of utterly familiar and unoriginal drama". In another review in The New Yorker separately supplementing the review by Brody, Anthony Lane rejected the film's suggestion that film critics are out to destroy films, explaining, "Someone could have told Iñárritu that critics, though often mean, are not preemptively so, and that anybody who'd say, as Tabitha does, 'I'm going to destroy your play', before actually seeing it, would not stay long in the job."

=== Accolades ===
At the 87th Academy Awards, Birdman or (The Unexpected Virtue of Ignorance) won four Academy Awards: Best Picture, Best Director, Best Original Screenplay, and Best Cinematography. Michael Keaton was nominated for Best Actor, Edward Norton and Emma Stone were nominated for Best Supporting Actor and Best Supporting Actress respectively, and it also received nominations for Best Sound Editing and Best Sound Mixing.

Keaton received his first Golden Globe Award, winning for Best Actor in a Motion Picture – Musical or Comedy at the 72nd Golden Globe Awards. The film also won the Golden Globe Award for Best Screenplay.

In 2016, the Directors Guild of America ranked the film 58th on its list of The 80 Best-Directed Films since the Guild’s founding in 1936. In 2021, members of Writers Guild of America West (WGAW) and Writers Guild of America, East (WGAE) voted its screenplay 51st in WGA’s 101 Greatest Screenplays of the 21st Century (So Far). In 2025, it was one of the films voted for the "Readers' Choice" edition of The New York Times' list of "The 100 Best Movies of the 21st Century," finishing at number 114.

==== Top ten lists ====
Birdman or (The Unexpected Virtue of Ignorance) was listed on many critics' top ten lists.

- 1st – Anne Thompson, Indiewire
- 1st – Garry Arnot, Cinema Perspective
- 1st – Steve Persall, Tampa Bay Times
- 1st – Christy Lemire, RogerEbert.com
- 1st – Lisa Kennedy, Denver Post
- 1st – Kristopher Tapley, HitFix
- 1st – Steven Rea, The Philadelphia Inquirer
- 1st – James Verniere, Boston Herald
- 2nd – Bob Mondello, NPR
- 2nd – Rafer Guzmán, Newsday
- 2nd – Gregory Ellwood, HitFix
- 2nd – Peter Travers, Rolling Stone
- 2nd – Jocelyn Noveck, Associated Press
- 2nd – Ann Hornaday, The Washington Post
- 2nd – Bill Goodykoontz, Arizona Republic
- 2nd – Barbara Vancheri, Pittsburgh Post-Gazette
- 2nd – Mick LaSalle & Leba Hertz, San Francisco Chronicle
- 2nd – Jeffrey M. Anderson, San Francisco Examiner
- 3rd – Rene Rodriguez, Miami Herald
- 3rd – Alci Rengifo, The Corsair
- 3rd – Peter Debruge, Variety
- 3rd – Todd McCarthy, The Hollywood Reporter
- 3rd - Christopher Orr, The Atlantic
- 3rd – Betsy Sharkey, Los Angeles Times (tied with The Grand Budapest Hotel)
- 4th – People
- 4th – Richard Roeper, Chicago Sun-Times
- 4th - Matthew Jacobs & Christopher Rosen, The Huffington Post
- 5th – Alison Willmore, BuzzFeed
- 6th – Jessica Kiang, Indiewire
- 6th – David Ansen, The Village Voice
- 6th – Peter Hartlaub, San Francisco Chronicle
- 7th - RogerEbert.com
- 7th – Jeff Baker, The Oregonian
- 7th – Glenn Kenny, RogerEbert.com
- 8th – Matt Mueller, Indiewire
- 9th – Owen Gleiberman, BBC
- 9th – Chris Nashawaty, Entertainment Weekly
- 10th – Ty Burr, The Boston Globe
- 10th – Sasha Stone, Awards Daily
- 10th – Richard Corliss, Time
- Top 10 (ranked alphabetically) – David Denby, The New Yorker
- Top 10 (ranked alphabetically) – Moira Macdonald, Seattle Times
- Top 10 (ranked alphabetically) – Justin Lowe, Indiewire
- Top 10 (ranked alphabetically) – Claudia Puig, USA Today
- Top 10 (ranked alphabetically) – Carrie Rickey, CarrieRickey.com
- Top 10 (listed alphabetically) – Stephen Whitty, The Star-Ledger
- Top 10 (listed alphabetically) – Joe Morgenstern, The Wall Street Journal
- Top 10 (ranked alphabetically) – Joe Williams & Calvin Wilson, St. Louis Post-Dispatch
- Best of 2014 (listed alphabetically, not ranked) – Manohla Dargis, The New York Times

== See also ==
- Alejandro González Iñárritu filmography
