= Viewfinder (disambiguation) =

A viewfinder is a device used in photography.

Viewfinder may also refer to:

- Viewfinder (album), a 2001 album by the group Pullman
- Viewfinder (short story), a 1978 short story by Raymond Carver
- Viewfinder (video game), a puzzle video game by Sad Owl Studios
