= Raymond Carver =

American story writer and poet (1938–1988)

- Carver in 1956
- Born: Raymond Clevie Carver Jr. May 25, 1938; Clatskanie, Oregon, U.S.
- Died: August 2, 1988 (aged 50); Port Angeles, Washington, U.S.
- Education: Chico State College; Humboldt State College (BA); University of Iowa
- Occupation: Writer
- Spouses: Maryann Burk (m. 1957; div. 1982) Tess Gallagher (m. 1988)
- Writing career
- Period: 1958–1988
- Genres: Short story, poetry
- Movements: Minimalism, dirty realism

Raymond Clevie Carver Jr. (May 25, 1938 – August 2, 1988) was an American short story writer and poet. He published his first collection of stories, Will You Please Be Quiet, Please?, in 1976. His breakout collection, What We Talk About When We Talk About Love (1981), received immediate acclaim and established Carver as an important figure in the literary world. It was followed by Cathedral (1983), which Carver considered his watershed and is widely regarded as his masterpiece. The definitive collection of his stories, Where I'm Calling From, was published shortly before his death in 1988. In their 1989 nomination of Carver for the Pulitzer Prize for Fiction, the jury concluded, "The revival in recent years of the short story is attributable in great measure to Carver's mastery of the form."

== Early life ==
Carver was born in Clatskanie, Oregon, a mill town on the Columbia River, and grew up in Yakima, Washington, the son of Ella Beatrice Carter (née Casey) and Clevie Raymond Carver. His father, a sawmill worker from Arkansas, was a fisherman and a heavy drinker. Carver's mother worked on and off as a waitress and a retail clerk. His brother, James Franklin Carver, was born in 1943.

Carver was educated at local schools in Yakima. In his spare time, he read mostly novels by Mickey Spillane or publications such as Sports Afield and Outdoor Life, and hunted and fished with friends and family.

After graduating from Yakima High School in 1956, Carver worked with his father at a sawmill in California. In June 1957, at age 19, he married 16-year-old Maryann Burk, who had just graduated from a private Episcopal school for girls. Their daughter, Christine La Rae, was born in December 1957. Their second child, a boy named Vance Lindsay, was born a year later. Carver worked as a delivery man, janitor, library assistant, and sawmill laborer, while Maryann worked as an administrative assistant, high school English teacher, salesperson, and waitress.

== Writing career ==
Carver moved to Paradise, California, with his family in 1958 to be close to his mother-in-law. He became interested in writing while attending Chico State College and enrolled in a creative writing course taught by the novelist John Gardner, then a recent doctoral graduate of the Iowa Writers' Workshop, who became a mentor and had a major influence on Carver's life and career. In 1961, Carver's first published story, "The Furious Seasons", appeared. More florid than his later work, the story strongly bore the influence of William Faulkner. "Furious Seasons" was later used as a title for a collection of stories published by Capra Press, and is part of the collection, No Heroics, Please and Call If You Need Me.

Carver continued his studies under the short story writer Richard Cortez Day (alumnus of the Iowa program) beginning in autumn 1960 at Humboldt State College in Arcata. He chose not to take the foreign language courses required by the English program and received a B.A. in general studies in 1963. During this period he was first published and served as editor for Toyon, the college's literary magazine, in which he published several of his own pieces under his own name as well as the pseudonym John Vale.

With his B-minus average, exacerbated by his penchant to forsake coursework for literary endeavors, ballasted by a sterling recommendation from Day, Carver was accepted into the Iowa Writers' Workshop on a $1,000 fellowship for the 1963–1964 academic year. Homesick for California and unable to fully adjust to the program's upper middle class milieu, he only completed 12 credits out of the 30 required for a M.A. degree or 60 for the M.F.A. degree. Although program director Paul Engle awarded him a fellowship for a second year of study after Maryann Carver personally interceded and compared her husband's plight to Tennessee Williams' deleterious experience in the program three decades earlier, Carver decided to leave the University of Iowa at the end of the semester. According to biographer Carol Sklenicka, Carver falsely claimed to have received an M.F.A. from Iowa in 1966 on later curricula vitae. Maryann, who postponed completing her education to support her husband's educational and literary endeavors, eventually graduated from San Jose State College in 1970 and taught English at Los Altos High School until 1977. After completing graduate work at Stanford, she briefly enrolled in the University of California, Santa Barbara's English doctoral program when Carver taught at the institution as a visiting lecturer in 1974.

In the mid-1960s, Carver and his family resided in Sacramento, where he briefly worked at a bookstore before taking a position as a night custodian at Mercy Hospital. He did all of the janitorial work in the first hour and then wrote through the rest of his shift. He audited classes at what was then Sacramento State College, including workshops with poet Dennis Schmitz. Carver and Schmitz soon became friends, and Carver wrote and published his first book of poems, Near Klamath, under Schmitz's guidance.

1967 was a landmark year for Carver with the appearance of "Will You Please Be Quiet, Please?" in Martha Foley's annual Best American Short Stories anthology and the impending publication of Near Klamath by the English Club of Sacramento State College. He briefly enrolled in the library science graduate program at the University of Iowa that summer but returned to California following the death of his father. Shortly thereafter, the Carvers relocated to Palo Alto, California, so he could take his first white-collar job, at Science Research Associates, a subsidiary of IBM in nearby Menlo Park, California, where he worked intermittently as a textbook editor and public relations director through 1970.

Following a 1968 sojourn to Israel, the Carvers relocated to San Jose, California; as Maryann finished her undergraduate degree, he continued his graduate studies in library science at San Jose State through the end of 1969 before failing once again to take a degree. During this period, he established vital literary connections with Gordon Lish, who worked across the street from Carver as director of linguistic research at Behavioral Research Laboratories, and the poet/publisher George Hitchcock.

After the publication of "Neighbors" in the June 1971 issue of Esquire at the instigation of Lish (by now ensconced as the magazine's fiction editor), Carver began to teach at the University of California, Santa Cruz at the behest of provost James B. Hall, an Iowa alumnus and early mentor to Ken Kesey at the University of Oregon, commuting from his new home in Sunnyvale, California.

Having endured a succession of failed applications to the Stegner Fellowship, Carver was admitted to the prestigious non-degree Stanford University graduate creative writing program for the 1972–1973 term, where he cultivated friendships with Kesey-era luminaries Ed McClanahan and Gurney Norman in addition to contemporaneous fellows Chuck Kinder, Max Crawford, and William Kittredge. The $4,000 stipend enabled the Carvers to buy a house in Cupertino, California. He also took on another teaching job at the University of California, Berkeley that year and briefly rented a pied-à-terre in the city; this development was precipitated by his initiation of an extramarital affair with Diane Cecily, a University of Montana administrator and mutual friend of Kittredge who would subsequently marry Kinder.

During his years of working at miscellaneous jobs, rearing children, and trying to write, Carver started abusing alcohol. By his own admission, he gave up writing and took to full-time drinking. In the fall semester of 1973, Carver was a visiting lecturer in the Iowa Writers' Workshop with John Cheever, but Carver stated that they did less teaching than drinking and almost no writing. With the assistance of Kinder and Kittredge, he attempted to simultaneously commute to Berkeley and maintain his lectureship at Santa Cruz; after missing all but a handful of classes due to the inherent logistical hurdles of this arrangement and various alcohol-related illnesses, Hall gently enjoined Carver to resign his position. The next year, after leaving Iowa City, Carver went to a treatment center to attempt to overcome his alcoholism, but continued drinking for another three years.

His first short story collection, Will You Please Be Quiet, Please?, was published in 1976. The collection itself was shortlisted for the National Book Award, though it sold fewer than 5,000 copies that year.

== Personal life and death ==
=== Decline of first marriage ===
The following excerpt from Scott Driscoll's review of Maryann Burk Carver's 2006 memoir describes the decline of her and Raymond's marriage.

The fall began with Ray's trip to Missoula, Mont., in '72 to fish with friend and literary helpmate Bill Kittredge. That summer Ray fell in love with Diane Cecily, an editor at the University of Montana, whom he met at Kittredge's birthday party. "That's when the serious drinking began. It broke my heart and hurt the children. It changed everything."

"By fall of '74", writes Carver, "he was more dead than alive. I had to drop out of the PhD program so I could get him cleaned up and drive him to his classes". Over the next several years, Maryann's husband physically abused her. Friends urged her to leave Raymond.

"But I couldn't. I really wanted to hang in there for the long haul. I thought I could outlast the drinking. I'd do anything it took. I loved Ray, first, last and always."

Carver describes, without a trace of rancor, what finally put her over the edge. In the fall of '78, with a new teaching position at the University of Texas at El Paso, Ray started seeing Tess Gallagher, a writer from Port Angeles, who would become his muse and wife near the end of his life. "It was like a contretemps. He tried to call me to talk about where we were. I missed the calls. He knew he was about to invite Tess to Thanksgiving." So he wrote a letter instead.

"I thought, I've gone through all those years fighting to keep it all balanced. Here it was, coming at me again, the same thing. I had to get on with my own life. But I never fell out of love with him."

After being hospitalized three times between June 1976 and February or March 1977, Carver began his "second life" and stopped drinking on June 2, 1977, with the help of Alcoholics Anonymous. While he continued to regularly smoke cannabis and later experimented with cocaine at the behest of Jay McInerney during a 1980 visit to New York City, Carver believed he would have died of alcoholism at the age of 40 had he not overcome his drinking.

=== Second marriage ===
In November 1977, Carver met the poet Tess Gallagher at a writers' conference in Dallas, Texas. Gallagher later remembered feeling "as if my life until then had simply been a rehearsal for meeting him." Beginning in January 1979, Carver and Gallagher lived together in El Paso, Texas, in a borrowed cabin near Port Angeles, Washington, and in Tucson, Arizona.

In 1980, the two moved to Syracuse, New York, where Gallagher had been appointed the coordinator of the creative writing program at Syracuse University; Carver taught as a professor in the English department. He and Gallagher jointly purchased a house in Syracuse, at 832 Maryland Avenue. In ensuing years, the house became so popular that the couple had to hang a sign outside that read "Writers At Work" in order to be left alone. In 1982, he and his first wife, Maryann, were divorced.

On June 17, 1988, six weeks prior to his death, Carver and Gallagher married in Reno, Nevada.

=== Death ===
On August 2, 1988, Carver died in Port Angeles from lung cancer at the age of 50. In the same year, he was inducted into the American Academy of Arts and Letters. He is buried at Ocean View Cemetery in Port Angeles, Washington. The inscription on his tombstone reads:

LATE FRAGMENT
And did you get what
you wanted from this life, even so?
I did.
And what did you want?
To call myself beloved, to feel myself
beloved on the earth.

His poem "Gravy" is also inscribed.

As Carver's will directed, Tess Gallagher assumed the management of his literary estate.

== Awards and memorials ==
Carver was nominated for the National Book Award for his first major-press collection, Will You Please Be Quiet, Please? in 1977 and the Pulitzer Prize for Fiction for his third major-press collection, Cathedral (1983), the volume generally perceived as his best. Included in the latter collection are the award-winning stories "A Small, Good Thing", and "Where I'm Calling From". John Updike selected the latter for inclusion in The Best American Short Stories of the Century. For his part, Carver perceived Cathedral as a watershed in his career for its shift toward a more optimistic and confidently poetic style amid the diminution of Lish's literary influence. Carver won five O. Henry Awards with "Are These Actual Miles" (originally titled "What Is It?") (1973), "Put Yourself in My Shoes" (1974), "Are You A Doctor?" (1975), "A Small, Good Thing" (1983), and "Errand" (1988).

In Carver's birth town of Clatskanie, Oregon, a memorial park and statue are at the corner of Lillich and Nehalem streets, across from the library. A block away is the building where Carver was born.

== Legacy and posthumous publications ==
In December 2006, Gallagher published an essay in The Sun magazine, titled "Instead of Dying", about alcoholism and Carver's having maintained his sobriety. The essay is an adaptation of a talk she initially delivered at the Welsh Academy's Academi Intoxication Conference in 2006. The first lines read: "Instead of dying from alcohol, Raymond Carver chose to live. I would meet him five months after this choice, so I never knew the Ray who drank, except by report and through the characters and actions of his stories and poems."

Chuck Kinder's Honeymooners: A Cautionary Tale (2001) is a roman à clef about his friendship with Carver in the 1970s. Carver's high school sweetheart and first wife, Maryann Burk Carver, wrote a memoir of her years with Carver, What it Used to be Like: A Portrait of My Marriage to Raymond Carver (2006).

In 2009, The New York Times Book Review and San Francisco Chronicle named Carol Sklenicka's unauthorized biography, Raymond Carver: A Writer's Life (2009), published by Scribner, one of the Best Ten Books of that year; and the San Francisco Chronicle deemed it: "exhaustively researched and definitive biography". Carver's widow, Tess Gallagher, refused to engage with Sklenicka.

His final (incomplete) collection of seven stories, titled Elephant and Other Stories in Britain (included in Where I'm Calling From: New and Selected Stories) was composed in the five years before his death. The nature of these stories, especially "Errand", have led to some speculation that Carver was preparing to write a novel. Only one piece of this work has survived – the fragment "The Augustine Notebooks", first printed in No Heroics, Please.

Tess Gallagher fought with Knopf for permission to republish the stories in What We Talk About When We Talk About Love as they were originally written by Carver, as opposed to the heavily edited and altered versions that appeared in 1981 under the editorship of Gordon Lish. On October 1, 2009, the book, entitled Beginners, was released in hardback in Great Britain, followed by its publication in the Library of America edition which collected all of Carver's short fiction in a single volume.

The Raymond Carver Reading Series at Syracuse University is a reading series program which annually brings 12 to 14 prominent writers to the campus. It is presented by the Creative Writing Program in SU's College of Arts and Sciences.

== Literary characteristics ==
Carver's career emphasized short stories and poetry. He described himself as "inclined toward brevity and intensity" and "hooked on writing short stories" (in the foreword of Where I'm Calling From: New and Selected Stories, a collection published in 1988 and a recipient of an honorable mention in the 2006 New York Times article citing the best works of fiction of the previous 25 years). Another stated reason for his brevity was "that the story [or poem] can be written and read in one sitting." This was not simply a preference but, particularly at the beginning of his career, a practical consideration as he juggled writing with work. His subject matter was often focused on blue-collar experience, and was clearly reflective of his own life.

Characteristics of minimalism are generally seen as one of the hallmarks of Carver's work, although, as reviewer David Wiegand notes:

Carver never thought of himself as a minimalist or in any category, for that matter.

"He rejected categories generally," Sklenicka says. "I don't think he had an abstract mind at all. He just wasn't built that way, which is why he's so good at picking the right details that will stand for many things."

Carver's editor at Esquire, Gordon Lish, was instrumental in shaping his prose in this direction – where his earlier tutor John Gardner had advised Carver to use fifteen words instead of twenty-five, Lish instructed Carver to use five in place of fifteen. Objecting to the "surgical amputation and transplantation" of Lish's heavy editing, Carver eventually broke with him. During this time, Carver also submitted poetry to James Dickey, then poetry editor of Esquire.

Carver's style has also been described as dirty realism, which connected him with a group of writers in the 1970s and 1980s that included Richard Ford and Tobias Wolff with both of whom Carver was closely acquainted, as well as others such as Ann Beattie, Frederick Barthelme, and Jayne Anne Phillips. With the exception of Beattie, who wrote about upper-middle-class people, these were writers who focused on sadness and loss in the everyday lives of ordinary people—often lower-middle class or isolated and marginalized people.

In his essay "On Influence", Carver states that, while he was an admirer of Ernest Hemingway's fiction, he never saw him as an influence, citing instead the work of Lawrence Durrell.

== Works ==
=== Fiction ===
==== Collections ====
- Will You Please Be Quiet, Please? (first published 1976)
- Furious Seasons and Other Stories. (Santa Barbara, CA: Capra Press, 1977) ISBN 9780884961161
- What We Talk About When We Talk About Love (1981)
- Cathedral (1983)
- Elephant and Other Stories (1988) – this title published only in Great Britain; included as a section of Where I'm Calling From: New and Selected Stories in the U.S.
- Beginners (2009)

==== Compilations ====
- Where I'm Calling From: New and Selected Stories (1988)
- Short Cuts: Selected Stories (1993) – published to accompany the Robert Altman film Short Cuts
- Collected Stories (2009) – complete short fiction including Beginners

=== Poetry ===
==== Collections ====
- Near Klamath (1968)
- Winter Insomnia (1970)
- At Night The Salmon Move (1976)
- Fires (1983) (Also contains essays and stories)
- Where Water Comes Together With Other Water (1985)
- Ultramarine (1986)
- A New Path To The Waterfall (1989)
- Gravy (Unknown year)

==== Compilations ====
- In a Marine Light: Selected Poems (1988)
- All of Us: The Collected Poems (1996)

=== Screenplays ===
- Dostoevsky (1982, with Tess Gallagher) (published in 1985)
- Purple Lake (1983, with Michael Cimino) (unpublished)

== Films and theatre adaptations ==
- I Could See the Smallest Things... a 1982 Clark University stage production based on five stories from Carver's What We Talk About When We Talk About Love
- Short Cuts directed by Robert Altman (1993), based on nine Carver short stories and a poem
- Everything Goes directed by Andrew Kotatko (2004), starring Hugo Weaving, Abbie Cornish and Sullivan Stapleton based on Carver's short story "Why Don't You Dance?"
- Jindabyne directed by Ray Lawrence (2006), based on Carver's short story "So Much Water So Close to Home"
- Everything Must Go directed by Dan Rush (2010), and starring Will Ferrell, based on Carver's short story "Why Don't You Dance?"
- Birdman or (The Unexpected Virtue of Ignorance), directed by Alejandro G. Iñárritu, depicts the mounting of a Broadway production of "What We Talk About When We Talk About Love" as its central storyline. The film's main character, Riggan Thomson, attributes his choice of acting as a profession to a complimentary note he once received from Raymond Carver written on a cocktail napkin. The film also preludes with Carver's poem "Late Fragment." In February 2015, Birdman won four Oscars, including the Academy Award for Best Picture.
- Whoever Was Using This Bed, directed by Andrew Kotatko (2016), starring Jean-Marc Barr, Radha Mitchell and Jane Birkin, based on Carver's short story of the same name
- The Idea directed by Henry Chastain (2025), starring Melora Walters, based on Carver’s short story of the same name.
