= What We Talk About When We Talk About Love =

1981 short story collection by Raymond Carver

- First edition
- Author: Raymond Carver
- Language: English
- Publisher: Knopf
- Publication date: 1981
- Publication place: United States
- Media type: Print
- Pages: 176

What We Talk About When We Talk About Love is a 1981 collection of short stories by American writer Raymond Carver, as well as the title of one of the stories in the collection. Considered by many to be one of American literature's most ambitious short-story collections, it was this collection that turned Raymond Carver into a household name in the publishing industry.

== Content ==
=== "Why Don't You Dance?" ===
"Why Don't You Dance?" tells the story of a middle-aged man overseeing a yard sale, where many of his possessions are being sold. A young couple stops by to select furniture for their new apartment. They briefly haggle with him over prices, buying a TV and a bed. The man tells the young woman to put a record on, and, when the music begins, asks the couple to dance. The young man is reluctant, but they dance. When the middle-aged man dances with the girl she tells him "You must be desperate or something." Several weeks later, the woman is telling her friends about the man at his yard sale. She indicates the record player and records he gave them, saying: "Will you look at this shit?" She repeatedly and unsuccessfully tries to describe the man's situation to others, hoping to make sense of the man's situation, before eventually giving up.

=== "Viewfinder" ===
A hook-handed man takes a photograph of the narrator's house from the street, then sells it to him. The narrator asks the photographer in for coffee. The manuscript version of the same title appears in Beginners (2009).

=== "Mr. Coffee and Mr. Fixit" ===
A man reflects "about three years back" on his struggle to come to grips with a couple of troublesome relationships. He was surprised to see his elderly single mother kissing a man on the sofa upstairs. He says his kids were crazy and so was his wife, Myrna, who eventually fell for another man named Ross whom she met at Alcoholics Anonymous. He remembers how his father died and suggests to Myrna that they "hug awhile" and have a "real nice supper," and she responds somewhat lukewarmly. The manuscript version titled "Where Is Everyone?" appears in Beginners (2009).

=== "Gazebo" ===
Set in a roomy upstairs suite, motel managers Holly & Duane discuss the disintegration of their marriage. Duane has been having an affair with a cleaning lady, Juanita. Duane tries to convince Holly that their love can be rekindled and reconciled but Holly does not agree. Duane is left hopelessly bemoaning the future he had envisioned with Holly. Though he is self aware that it might not have really been the future he wanted himself. The manuscript version of the same title appears in Beginners (2009).

=== "I Could See the Smallest Things" ===
Nancy wakes up in the middle of the night because of a noise outside. She realizes it's the open gate, and hesitantly she goes to the kitchen to smoke for a while before going out to investigate, leaving her alcoholic husband Cliff "passed out" and snoring loudly in bed. At the fence, Nancy meets her neighbor Sam who is spreading insecticide to kill slugs which are ruining his garden. Nancy & Sam talk and it becomes clear Sam and Cliff, once good friends, have had a falling-out. Lonely and wishing to patch up their relationship, Sam asks Nancy to tell Cliff he said hello. Nancy says she will and goes back to bed, realizing she forgot to latch the gate shut. The manuscript version titled "Want to See Something?" appears in Beginners (2009).

=== "Sacks" ===
Les, a textbook salesman, reflects back a year ago on an incident where he met up with his father in a Sacramento airport. It's been two years since his father's divorce from his mother. While the wife was away, the father had been having an extramarital affair with a Stanley Products saleswoman. The father asks Les if everything is okay, and Les lies, saying everything is fine. A fissure seems to grow between the father and son during the uncomfortable, transient, confusing meeting. Fairly sure that his father will play a negligent to nonexistent role in his future, Les boards his flight. The manuscript version titled "The Fling" appears in Beginners (2009).

=== "The Bath" ===
On his birthday, young Scotty is walking to school when he is hit by a car and knocked unconscious. "The Bath" is a sibling to "A Small, Good Thing," one of Carver's most famous stories, which was published in Cathedral. Because of heavy edits made by Carver's editor, Gordon Lish, it is much shorter than "A Small, Good Thing" and ends on an ambiguous note as Scotty's mother goes home from the hospital to take a bath, which is where this version of the story gets its name.

=== "Tell the Women We're Going" ===
Two close childhood friends, identified by the author as Bill Jamison & Jerry Roberts, are out of school and have married. After Jerry married, Bill sensed a change in his friend, something that he'd never once shown. One afternoon, the two men leave both their wives and Jerry's kids to go out for a drive, for old-time's sake. They play pool and drink beer at the Rec Center while reminiscing about the olden days. On their way out, they see two women biking down the road. Jerry proposes turning back and chatting them up, juvenile and excited. They pull up to the women and Bill introduces himself and Jerry, but the girls, named Barbara and Sharon, seem completely uninterested. They drive ahead and wait for the women to pass. The women, when they arrive, drop their bikes and cut down a path away from the men, which doesn't really bother Bill but angers Jerry, who devises a plan to cut them off. The story ends in a surprise twist, with Jerry bashing Sharon and Barbara over their heads with a rock, ostensibly killing them both and proving Jerry's deep unhappiness with life. The manuscript version of the same title appears in Beginners (2009).

=== "After the Denim" ===
James and Edith Packer, an elderly couple, go out for the night to play bingo at the local community center. While there, James is perturbed by a young hippy-like couple dressed in denim who go on to ruin his fun and evening: they take the Packers' parking spot; James sees the young man cheating and confronts him but the man denies the allegation. Later, when the young girl gets bingo, everybody but James claps. James is certain the couple will use the victory money on drugs. That night as the Packers are getting ready for bed, Edith reveals to James that she's been "bleeding" and "spotting," and she'll require medical attention. Restless and upset over his wife's sickness, James wonders why it isn't the young couple who has all the problems. The manuscript version titled "If It Please You" appears in Beginners (2009).

=== "So Much Water So Close to Home" ===
As she is having breakfast, Claire, is shocked to learn that her husband, Stuart, and his three buddies found the body of a girl washed up on the rivershore upon arriving in the afternoon for their yearly camping trip, as reported by the morning newspaper that day. Instead of reporting the body to the police immediately, the four rather enjoy their vacation, spending some time fishing, getting to eating, and drinking whisky as they sit by the fire, all the while the body of the dead girl lays there. As the quartet packs up the next morning, Stuart uses a payphone to alert the police about the corpse found by the riverbed. Claire feels deeply distanced from her husband, whom she thought she knew, and cannot stop wondering about the dead girl, to whom she feels oddly connected. She starts believing that Stuart and his friends could be behind the girl's murder. Claire wonders why they didn't go fishing locally and why they didn't report the body quickly, as she'd have. Later, after the body is identified and Stuart is at work, Claire reads the funeral plans in the newspaper and decides to attend. On her way to the funeral, a man in a pickup truck pulls her over and asks to talk to her. Though he claims he just wants to make sure she's safe, Claire believes that he is looking at her sexually through the glass. Claustrophobic and frightened, Claire clicks her car locks shut and says she's fine. After the funeral Claire overhears a woman saying they caught the killer, but Claire is not so certain they have the right man. The story ends with Stuart making a sexual advance on Claire in the kitchen. As he reaches for her breasts, she hears water running in the sink and is reminded of the girl floating in the river. The manuscript version of the same title appears in Beginners (2009).

=== "The Third Thing That Killed My Father Off" ===
The character of Jack Fraser, in classical Carver style, tells the story of a local outsider named Dummy who worked in the same sawmill as Jack's father Del. Del gets Dummy to fill a pond on his land with bass, but Dummy eventually builds an electric fence around it so people stop coming by. Dummy drifts further into isolation and his wife starts going around with another man, much to his discontent. The story ends with Dummy murdering his wife and committing suicide by drowning in his beloved pond. Del impresses upon Jack what a wrong woman can turn a man into. Later, Jack understands Dummy's plight more clearly. The manuscript version titled "Dummy" appears in Beginners (2009).

=== "A Serious Talk" ===
Burt finds himself incapable of leaving his wife Vera alone. On Boxing Day, Burt comes back to his wife's house to try and explain away his poor behavior from the night before. On Christmas Day, Burt put too many logs in the fire which could've burned the place down. On his way out to make room for Vera's boyfriend Charlie, Burt finds it appropriate to steal six pies from the kitchen counter left unattended. On the 26th, Vera does not want to talk to Burt; she doesn't have the time, it's obvious she has plans already. Burt tries again and again to apologize but Vera does not think it's sincere. Burt notices cigarette butts that are not Vera's regular brand collected in the ashtray, "their ashtray," and feels out of place. While Vera is the bathroom the phone rings and she shouts at Burt to answer it. It's a call for Charlie and Burt responds curtly, saying he's "not here" before leaving the phone off the hook. Vera comes back into the kitchen, and it's clear she cannot tolerate Burt sticking around. The phone rings again and Vera says she'll answer it from the bedroom. Instead of hanging up when Vera commands, Burt takes a knife from the cabinet and cuts the cord in two. Vera realizes what's happened and yells for Burt to leave, saying she'll get a restraining order. Burt leaves calmly and, as he drives away in his car holding their ashtray, he is deludedly convinced that in a few weeks they'll have a "serious talk" and get back together. The manuscript version titled "Pie" appears in Beginners (2009).

=== "The Calm" ===
A man sitting in a barber's chair getting a haircut listens as three men waiting their turn argue about a hunting story one of the men is telling. The manuscript version of the same title appears in Beginners (2004).

=== "Popular Mechanics" ===
The protagonist is seen first packing a suitcase, all the while a woman swears at him and yells loudly, glad that he's finally leaving her. Their baby won't stop crying. The protagonist decides he wants to bring the baby with him but the woman won't let him even get near their baby. The two get into a tussle and a tug-of-war over the baby. The story ends with the man and the woman pulling tremendously on the baby, with somewhat ambiguously grim and dark possibilities. Titled "Little Things" in Where I'm Calling From: New and Selected Stories (1988); the manuscript version titled "Mine" appears in Beginners (2009).

=== "Everything Stuck to Him" ===
A father tells his young adult daughter what life was like for their family when she was a young child, all while on vacation in Milan. The manuscript version titled "Distance" appears in Beginners (2009).

=== "One More Thing" ===
At the kitchen table, L.D. argues with his daughter Rae, age 15, about her beliefs. Maxine, the wife, comes home and notices L.D. is drunk. Maxine sides with Rae, saying she can like what she likes. In a moment of fury, L.D. throws a pickle jar through the window, shattering the glass. Maxine gives L.D. an ultimatum: he must pack his things and go or she'll call the police. L.D. starts packing, stuffing not only his belongings into his suitcase but also vindictively taking womanly toiletries he could make no use of. Taking one last look around, about to leave for good, L.D. says he has one more thing to tell his wife and daughter but, suddenly inarticulate, he is unable to put what he feels into words. The manuscript version of the same title appears in Beginners (2009).

=== "What We Talk About When We Talk About Love" ===
Mel McGinnis is a 45-year-old cardiologist married to Teresa, also known as Terri. They live together in Albuquerque. The narrator, Nick, describes Mel as tall and rangy with curly soft hair and Teresa (who is Mel's second wife) as bone-thin with a pretty face, dark eyes, and brown hair. Nick is 38 years old, and married to Laura, 35, who works as a legal secretary. The four sit around a table at Mel and Terri's, drinking gin in the afternoon.

They soon start to talk about love. Terri has had an abusive relationship; the abuse, she says, derives from love. Ed, Terri's former abusive boyfriend, "loved her so much he tried to kill her." Ed would beat Terri; he dragged her around the living room by her ankles knocking her into things along the way. Terri believes that Ed loved her and his abuse was his way of showing it. No matter what Terri says, Mel refuses to believe that was "love". Ed also stalked Mel and Terri and called Mel at work with threatening messages. At one point, Mel was so scared he bought a gun and made out a will. Mel even wrote to his brother in California, saying that "if something happened to him" to look for Ed.

Terri's abusive boyfriend eventually committed suicide after two attempts (as Terri sees it, another act of love). Ed's first attempt at suicide was when Terri had left him. Ed had drunk rat poison, but was rushed to the hospital where he was saved. In Ed's second, successful attempt he shot himself in the mouth. Terri and Mel argued about whether she could be in the hospital bedroom with him when he died. Terri won and was with Ed as he died; as Terri puts it, "He never came up out of it."

Soon afterward, Mel begins a story about an elderly couple struck by a drunk driver, a teenager who was pronounced dead at the scene. Mel was called into the hospital and saw how badly the elderly couple had been injured. He says that they had "multiple fractures, internal injuries, hemorrhaging, contusions, and lacerations." The couple were in casts and bandages from head to toe. Mel's point in telling the story is the husband's consternation when the couple was moved into the intensive care unit. Mel would visit the couple daily, and when he put his ear to the husband's mouth-hole, the latter told Mel he was upset because he could not see his wife through his eye-holes.

Mel strays from the topic with more talk about Ed, his personal thoughts about love, hatred toward his ex-wife, and life as a knight. Mel feels even though one loves a person, if something were to happen to them, the survivor would grieve but love again.

After finishing the second bottle of gin, the couples discuss going to dinner, but no one makes any moves to proceed with their plans.

==== Earlier version ====
Carver's original draft of the story "Beginners" was heavily edited by Gordon Lish, who cut out nearly half of Carver's story, adding in details of his own. Carver's original draft, released by his widow Tess Gallagher and published in a December 2007 issue of the New Yorker, reveals the extensive edits. For instance, the character Mel was originally named Herb, and the abusive boyfriend, renamed Ed by Lish, was originally named Carl. Additionally, Herb's story about the old couple was cut nearly in half, with Lish removing the story of the old couple's home life, love, and reunion in the hospital. In Carver's original version, the two had separate rooms, which caused them to pine for each other and eventually led to a scene when they met again. Lish removed all of this, rewrote the couple into the same room, but in body casts that prevented them from seeing each other, and then explained the old man's distress thus:

"I mean, the accident was one thing, but it wasn't everything. I'd get up to his mouth-hole, you know, and he'd say no, it wasn't the accident exactly but it was because he couldn't see her through the eye-holes. He said that that was making him feel so bad. Can you imagine? I'm telling you, the man's heart was breaking because he couldn't turn his goddamn head and 'see' his goddamn wife." Mel looked around the table and shook his head at what he was going to say. "I mean, it was killing the old fart just because he couldn't 'look' at the fucking woman."

Lish also cut out eight paragraphs at the end, in which Terri communicates her worry over Herb's depression to Laura and Nick, and another aspect of love is shown as Laura comforts Terri, tying together all the types of love discussed in the story.

== Editing ==
There was some contention between Raymond Carver and his editor Gordon Lish over several stories in the collection; the author complained about the "surgical amputation and transplant that might make them someway fit into the carton so the lid will close." Eventually, the book was published with Lish's extensive alterations, and received critical acclaim.

Shortly before his death, Carver arranged the publication of his own selection of 37 of his stories, Where I'm Calling From: New and Selected Stories. He included some stories as edited by Lish, some restored from his original manuscripts, and some unpublished stories.

Carver's widow, Tess Gallagher, fought with Knopf for permission to republish the 17 stories in What We Talk About When We Talk About Love as they were originally written by Carver. These original versions eventually appeared in Beginners, published by Jonathan Cape in 2009, and in the Library of America volume Collected Stories.

== In popular culture ==
- The stories "So Much Water So Close to Home" and "Tell the Women We're Going" were adapted for Robert Altman's 1993 feature film Short Cuts. The former was the inspiration for the Paul Kelly song "Everything's Turning to White" on the album So Much Water So Close to Home and was also later adapted for the 2006 film Jindabyne.
- The story "Why Don't You Dance?" serves as the basis for the award-winning 2004 short film Everything Goes as well as for the 2010 feature film Everything Must Go.
- The 2012 film Stuck in Love uses the quote, "I could hear my heart beating. I could hear everyone's heart. I could hear the human noise we sat there making, not one of us moving, not even when the room went dark" from "What We Talk About When We Talk About Love" as the main character's, author Bill Borgens's, favorite quote. They are the last words spoken in the film.
- Alejandro González Iñárritu's 2014 film Birdman or: The Unexpected Virtue of Ignorance depicts an eclipsed Hollywood star, Riggan Thomson, who mounts a Broadway production of "What We Talk About When We Talk About Love" as its central storyline. The Broadway production includes several aspects of the Carver story—such as the four friends telling stories over a bottle of gin, and Mel's story about the couple in the car crash—but also includes other, more melodramatic storylines that are not part of the Carver story. Thomson attributes his choice of acting as a profession to a complimentary note he once received from Carver written on a cocktail napkin.
- In Sun Kil Moon's January 2023 release of the single "Black Perch", Mark Kozelek reflects on his youth and personal growth while delving into "What We Talk About When We Talk About Love". The lyrics recount Kozelek's initial jealousy and avoidance of Carver's work, influenced by his ex-girlfriend's admiration for it. However, as he matures, Kozelek finds enlightenment and comfort in Carver's writings, ultimately paying heartfelt homage to Carver's profound impact on the human experience.
