= Why Don't You Dance? =

Short story by Raymond Carver

- Short story by Raymond Carver
- Language: English

Publication
- Published in: Quarterly West; The Paris Review
- Publication date: Autumn 1978; Spring 1981

"Why Don't You Dance?" is a short story by American author Raymond Carver. It was published in the Spring 1981 edition of The Paris Review and that same year in the short story collection What We Talk About When We Talk About Love.

== Synopsis ==
"Why Don't You Dance?" tells the story of a middle-aged man overseeing a yard sale, where many of his possessions are being sold. A young couple stops by to select furniture for their new apartment. They briefly haggle with him over prices, buying a TV and a bed. The man tells the young woman to put a record on, and, when the music begins, asks the couple to dance. The young man is reluctant, but they dance. When the middle-aged man dances with the girl she tells him "You must be desperate or something." Several weeks later, the woman is telling her friends about the man at his yard sale. She indicates the record player and records he gave them, saying: "Will you look at this shit?" She tries talking to everyone about the man to further make sense of his situation, but quits trying after a while.

== Publication ==
In 1977, Carver submitted a story with the title "Why Don't You Dance?" to Esquire, which Gordon Lish subsequently edited and retitled "I Am Going to Sit Down", but no version ever appeared in Esquire. The story was first published in Quarterly West in Autumn 1978 and later in The Paris Review in Spring 1981. The Quarterly West version incorporated many of Lish's suggested changes, while the final version was 9% shorter. It was first collected the same year in What We Talk About When We Talk About Love and later in Where I'm Calling From: New and Selected Stories.

== Analysis ==
Literary scholar Charles E. May identified the story as being "a particularly pure example of the Chekhovian story's convention of trying to express inner reality by focusing on outer reality."

== Film adaptations ==
The story was adapted into the 2002 short film Why Don't You Dance? by Michael Downing, the 2004 short film Everything Goes starring Hugo Weaving, and the 2010 film Everything Must Go starring Will Ferrell and written and directed by Dan Rush.
