= Viewfinder (short story) =

"View Finder"
- Short story by Raymond Carver
- Country: United States
- Language: English

Publication
- Published in: Quarterly West
- Publication date: Spring/Summer 1978

"Viewfinder" is a short story by American author Raymond Carver. It was originally published as "View Finder" in the Spring/Summer 1978 issue of Quarterly West, and in the Winter 1978 issue of The Iowa Review. It was later collected in What We Talk About When We Talk About Love (1981). It is told in the first-person narrative of a man who is visited by an elderly man with prosthetic hook hands.

The man comes to the narrator's house to try and sell him a picture of the latter's house. The narrator is obsessed with the fact that the elderly man has hook hands, and invites him into his house to see how he will hold a cup of coffee. The narrator decides to have the hook-handed man take more pictures in his house. The story ends with the narrator climbing onto the roof so that his picture could be taken as he throws a rock off the roof.

Indicative of Carver's often dissociative and working class themes, the story focuses on the connection between physical deformity and social deformity, the hook arms being a shadow of the narrator's anti-social behavior.
