= Everything Goes (film) =

- Theatrical release poster
- Directed by: Andrew Kotatko
- Written by: Andrew Kotatko
- Based on: "Why Don't You Dance?" by Raymond Carver
- Produced by: Colin Englert
- Starring: Hugo Weaving; Abbie Cornish; Sullivan Stapleton; Nikki Bennett
- Cinematography: Martin McGrath, ACS
- Music by: Ben Frost
- Production company: Soft Paw Films
- Distributed by: Soft Paw Films
- Release date: 14 June 2004 (Sydney Film Festival)
- Running time: 18 minutes
- Country: Australia
- Language: English
- Budget: $180,000

Everything Goes (stylized as everything goes) is a 2004 short film directed by Andrew Kotatko. It is based on the 1978 short story "Why Don't You Dance?" from Raymond Carver's 1981 collection What We Talk About When We Talk About Love. The film stars Hugo Weaving, Abbie Cornish and Sullivan Stapleton. Everything Goes won the award for Best Short Film at the 2004 Inside Film Awards and was the only Australian film selected for the prestigious Clermont-Ferrand International Short Film Festival in 2005.

== Synopsis ==
The film depicts the unlikely relationship that forms between a young couple (Cornish and Stapleton) looking to begin their future together and a lonely middle-aged man (Weaving) trying to rid himself of the past.

== Cast ==
- Hugo Weaving as Ray
- Abbie Cornish as Brianie
- Sullivan Stapleton as Jack
- Nikki Bennett as Ray's Wife

== Reviews ==
The film received positive reviews from critics. In an article on Australian cinema for Cinematical.com, respected American film critic Jeffrey M. Anderson praised Everything Goes as "everything a great short film can be" and noted that "Kotatko makes spectacular use of light and space, using Carver's words when necessary and conjuring up wordless images just as potent".
