= Elephant and Other Stories =

1988 short story collection by Raymond Carver

- First edition (publ. Collins Harvill)
- Author: Raymond Carver
- Language: English
- Genre: Short stories
- Publisher: Collins Harvill
- Publication date: August 1988
- Publication place: England
- Media type: Print (hardback & paperback)
- Pages: 124
- ISBN: 9780002710404
- OCLC: 17585618

Elephant and Other Stories (1988) is the last collection of short stories by American writer Raymond Carver. They were the final seven stories Carver wrote before his death, and only appeared as a separate book in Great Britain. The book was published by Collins Harvill in London on August 4, 1988, two days after Carver's death.

In the United States, these seven stories were published as a section of Where I'm Calling From: New and Selected Stories (1988).

== Stories ==
The collection contains the following stories:

=== Boxes ===
The narrator and Jill find each other after failed marriages. Soon after they set up a household, their comfortable life is disrupted by the arrival of the narrator's seventy-year-old mother. She is constantly on the move, going from one place to another, hoping to find a good life, but is always disappointed by what she encounters. When she moves to her son's community, she dislikes everything about it. No sooner does she move into her quarters then she packs her possessions into boxes (the story's title) in preparation to return to California. A half year passes before she finally departs. During this time, Jill's easy going response to the mother's disruptive presence keeps the narrator and Jill's relationship on even keel. When the mother finally heads back to California in her packed car, both she and her son realize that they are not likely to see each other again.

=== Whoever Was Using This Bed ===
A 3:00 am phone call wakes the narrator and his wife, Iris, from a deep sleep. When the narrator answers the phone, a woman's voice asks to speak to "Bud." The narrator tells the woman she has a wrong number and hangs up. But she persistently calls back, forcing him to take the phone off the hook. Once back in bed, Iris starts chain smoking and engages the narrator in conversation. The narrator desperately wants to go back to sleep, but he gets caught up in Iris's ruminations. He begins chain smoking as well. Iris talks about the dream the phone call interrupted. She doesn't remember the details, but she recalls that the dream did not include the narrator, which upsets him. As the night moves on, the narrator is very much aware of the passage of time, and hopes to be able to catch some sleep before daybreak, when he needs to get up to go to work. But he is engaged in the chat with his wife. Ultimately, the conversation focuses on whether one partner will "pull the plug" on the other if either were mortally incapacitated. Iris wants the narrator to pull the plug, but after some thought, the narrator asks Iris to let the doctors do what they can do. Don't pull the plug. At daybreak, the narrator gets up and goes to work. Throughout the day he reflects on his conversation with Iris and on his fatigue. That night, the phone rings and the familiar woman's voice asks for "Bud." While the narrator is holding the phone, Iris pulls the plug—and disconnects the phone.

=== Intimacy ===
The narrator has achieved a measure of public recognition as a writer. While on the road, he drops by his ex-wife's house unannounced. It has been four years since they last met. When she sees him, she launches into a non-stop soliloquy, enumerating her hurts and anger at his betrayal. Through her onslaught, it is clear that she cared dearly for him and the lost life they built together. After her diatribe dies down, the narrator drops to his knees before her, holding the hem of her dress. She becomes self-conscious, then worries that her new husband will return home and find them together. She indicates that the reason he visited her was to gain new material for his stories. She asks him to leave. He departs.

=== Menudo ===
In the middle of the night, the narrator reflects on his relations with three women: his current wife, Vicky; his ex-wife, Molly; and the neighbor with whom he is having a sexual affair, Amanda. He looks out his window and sees the lights on at Amanda's house and wonders what she is doing. After Amanda's husband Oliver discovered her affair with the narrator, he left the house, giving Amanda an ultimatum to move out within a week. Vicky also knows of the affair and is now snubbing him. It is not clear how their relationship will end or what kind of a future relationship he will have with Amanda. He reflects on his treatment of his ex-wife, Molly. She loved him unconditionally. When he left her for Vicky, she had a breakdown and was sent to a mental institution. The narrator had trouble dealing with Molly's breakdown—while attending a drinking party at an artist friend's house (Alfredo), he began to shake uncontrollably. The friend said he would fix him a menudo, a Mexican soup made of tripe, sausage, onions, tomatoes, chili powder, and other ingredients. The menudo would calm him down. But the narrator fell asleep before the menudo was ready and as a consequence he never sampled it. As the narrator reflects on his life with the three women, dawn arrives. Looking outside, he sees leaves scattered on his lawn. He dresses, grabs a rake and rakes and bags the leaves on his lawn. Then he begins raking a neighbor's lawn, and the story ends.

=== Elephant ===
A man who has recently lost his job asks the narrator, his brother, for money, assuring him that he will pay him back. The narrator's mother regularly borrows money from the narrator too, and so the narrator tells his brother to pay the money to his mother, as that month's loan to her from him. However, the brother does not pay back all the money, and thus the narrator must nonetheless pay his mother for the month. He expresses frustration at this, but he continues to work hard and loan his mother money, thinking that his brother will not ask again given that he has not paid back the original money. His daughter says she needs money to get a job to help her kids, and he thus begins giving her money each month. He also gives money monthly to his ex-wife. His son asks him for money too, but the financial demands become high, and so he says he can no longer give as much. His son then tells him that he will engage in criminal activity to get money if he doesn't send it to him, so he continues to do so, but must live a much more restrained life himself, as well as needing loans to have enough for all the family members he must help. Eventually, he sends all his relatives a letter saying that he will change his name, quit his job and go to live in Australia, and no longer be burdened by them; they respond in various ways- his son threatens to commit suicide, his mother says she will go back into work at the age of seventy-five, his daughter says she will get a job but needs more money to start up, and his ex-wife doesn't respond. He abandons the idea. He then gets a call from his brother asking for more money and assuring him once again that he will pay him back, but he does not, and he gives various excuses for this. The narrator then has two dreams, the first in which he recalls climbing up on his dad's shoulders and pretending that he is an elephant; the second in which he is with his ex-wife and children happily, before he recalls threatening to kill his son years before. He realizes how ridiculous his promise to go to Australia appeared to his relatives. He walks along a road and feels more contented with his life as he does so; a colleague of his, George, then offers to take him to work, which he accepts, and he reveals he didn't pay for his car. He then drives very quickly, and the narrator finds this thrilling.

=== Blackbird Pie ===
A man recalls receiving a letter from his wife years ago in which she explains her reasons for leaving him, and he repeatedly insists that it is not in her handwriting. He has a great memory, but says he accidentally threw the letter away years ago, so he writes part of it out from what he remembers. He recalls her unusual behaviour at their dinner before reading the letter. He then, after reading part of it, reads extracts and stray sentences from the rest of the letter in a mix, and notices that she has left the house. He meets her outside with a horse, a deputy and a rancher named Frank, and the parting occurs without any real problems emerging, although he sees tears in his wife's eyes. He remembers a black-and-white photograph of her when she was three months pregnant as she leaves, states that he believes she will return to him, and then repeats that the letter was not in her handwriting.

=== Errand ===
Anton Chekhov is with his friend the publisher Aleksey Suvorin at a restaurant when blood comes out of his mouth. He is visited in bed after the incident by his sister and by Leo Tolstoy, with whom he discusses the soul. He is diagnosed with tuberculosis. He goes to Berlin to meet the physician Karl Ewald Hasse, but leaves in anger when he is told his case is hopeless. He tells his mother and sister that he will soon recover, knowing this to be false. He becomes delirious one night and his wife calls a doctor called Schwöhrer. He is about to call others, but Chekhov tells him that it is pointless, so instead he orders three glasses of champagne from the hotel. They each have one, and Chekhov says that it is a long time since he has had champagne, before he dies. His wife asks to be alone with him before news spreads, and Schwöhrer agrees to prevent anyone knowing temporarily and leave them. The young man who brought the champagne then returns and brings a vase of roses. She pays him to bring a distinguished mortician, but act naturally, as if engaged on a simple errand. He picks up the vase to take with him, and then uses his other hand to pick up the champagne cork on the floor.

== Reception ==
Adam Begley of the London Review of Books assessed Elephant as "seven exquisitely crafted stories; all of them provide eloquent testimony to the authority of his prose."
