= Everything Must Go (film) =

- Theatrical release poster
- Directed by: Dan Rush
- Screenplay by: Dan Rush
- Based on: "Why Don't You Dance?" by Raymond Carver
- Produced by: Marty Bowen; Wyck Godfrey
- Starring: Will Ferrell; Rebecca Hall; Michael Peña
- Cinematography: Michael Barrett
- Edited by: Sandra Adair
- Music by: David Torn
- Production companies: Birdsong Pictures; Nationlight Productions; Temple Hill Entertainment
- Distributed by: Lionsgate; Roadside Attractions
- Release dates: September 10, 2010 (TIFF); October 29, 2010 (United States)
- Running time: 97 minutes
- Country: United States
- Language: English
- Budget: $5 million
- Box office: $2.8 million

Everything Must Go is a 2010 American comedy-drama film directed by Dan Rush and starring Will Ferrell. The film was based on Raymond Carver's 1978 short story "Why Don't You Dance?" and was released in theaters on May 13, 2011.

== Plot ==
In Arcadia, Arizona, salesman Nick Halsey is fired from his job of 16 years following an incident in Denver related to his alcoholism. After stabbing his supervisor Gary’s tires with his farewell gift – a Swiss Army Knife with his name on it – but leaving it behind, Nick has a confrontation with teenagers outside a convenience store. He returns home to find his wife Catherine is gone, the locks have been changed, and his belongings are strewn all over his lawn; she has left a letter explaining that she is leaving him, also over the Denver incident, and not to contact her.

After spending the night on the lawn, Nick meets his new pregnant neighbor, Samantha, and pays a neighborhood boy named Kenny to watch his things. He discovers that he has been cut off from his credit cards, joint bank account, and phone service, and his company car is taken back. Almost arrested when the police ask him to vacate the premises, Nick has them contact his AA sponsor, Detective Frank Garcia, who provides him with a permit for a yard sale, allowing him three more days before he must move on.

Nick gets Kenny to help him sell his possessions, promising to pay him and teach him to play baseball but is initially unwilling to let items go. He bonds with Samantha, who is still waiting for her husband to join her at their new house. Nick reveals that he had been sober for six months until a business trip to Denver, where he got blackout drunk with a female colleague; he awoke with no memory of the night before, but she lodged a complaint against him, leading to his firing.

Finding a yearbook with a friendly message from an old classmate, Delilah, Nick tracks her down; their reunion is awkward, but Delilah tells Nick he still has a good heart. Out of money and alcohol, Nick experiences withdrawal. Samantha brings him Valium and tells him to seek help, but Nick replies that she is no better than him for putting up with her husband’s drinking and frequent absences, and she storms off.

Nick awakens to find Kenny has arranged his belongings with thoughtful price tags, and they sell almost everything. Nick apologizes to Samantha, who admits he was right and has told her husband to either come home or get a divorce. She, Nick, and Kenny go out to dinner, where Nick runs into Gary, who reveals that the Denver incident probably did not happen: the female employee was fired for having a history of suing coworkers for sexual harassment, and Nick would likely have gotten his job back if he had not slashed Gary’s tires. When Gary leaves his beer behind, Nick refrains from drinking and returns it to him.

Visiting Frank at his office, Nick answers a call on Frank’s phone from Catherine. He confronts Frank, who admits Catherine has been staying with him; they fight, and Frank declares that Catherine deserves better than Nick. Driving him home, Frank observes that Nick’s marriage was bound to fail, and gives him Catherine’s divorce papers to sign, along with some money and the keys to Nick’s house. Asking Frank to tell his wife he is sorry, Nick walks home; he almost stops at the convenience store where he regularly bought beer, but moves on and spends the night in his old bed.

The next day, he pays Kenny – including what he skimmed for beer money – and receives an appreciative hug from Samantha, whose husband has come home. She hands him the picture she took of him a few days prior, with the message from the fortune cookie he gave her: “Everything is not yet lost”.

== Cast ==
- Will Ferrell as Nicholas "Nick" Halsey, the alcoholic protagonist
  - Casey Likes as young Nick
- Rebecca Hall as Samantha, who just moved in across the street
- Michael Peña as Frank Garcia, Nick's sponsor.
- Christopher "C.J." Wallace as Kenny, a neighborhood kid
- Glenn Howerton as Gary, Nick's supervisor
- Stephen Root as Elliot, Nick's neighbor
- Laura Dern as Delilah, Nick's high school friend

== Production ==
Filming took place in Phoenix and Scottsdale, Arizona. The film was released on September 10, 2010, at the Toronto International Film Festival as well as the London Film Festival on October 15.

== Release ==
The official trailer was released on April 5, 2010.

== Reception ==
Everything Must Go received positive reviews and has a score of 73% on Rotten Tomatoes based on 130 reviews with an average rating of 6.7 out of 10. The critical consensus states: "It may not improve on the Raymond Carver short story that inspired it, but Everything Must Go resists cliche and boasts a pair of magnetic performances from the perfectly cast Ferrell and Wallace." The film also has a score of 65 out of 100 on Metacritic based on 37 critics.
