= Abbie Cornish =

Australian actress (born 1982)

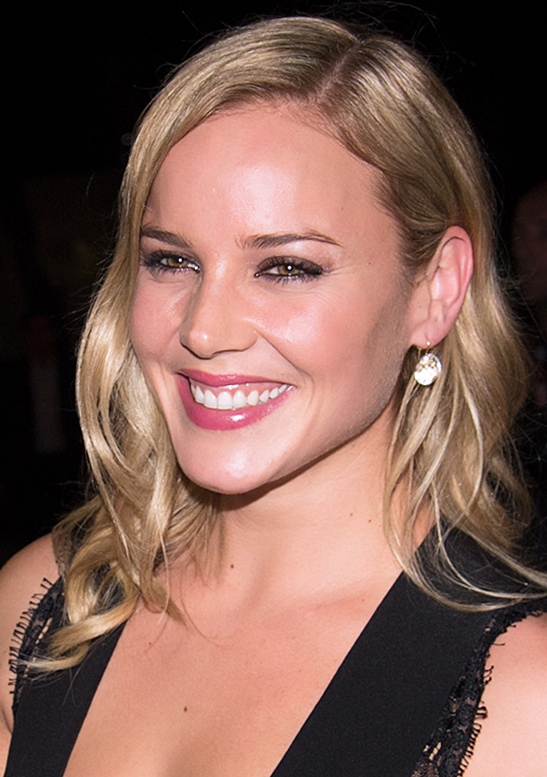
- Cornish in 2012
- Born: 7 August 1982 (age 44); Lochinvar, New South Wales, Australia
- Other name: Dusk
- Occupations: Actress, rapper
- Years active: 1997–present
- Relatives: Isabelle Cornish (sister)

Abbie Cornish (born 7 August 1982) is an Australian actress and rapper. In film, Cornish is known for her roles as Heidi in Somersault (2004), Fanny Brawne in Bright Star (2009), Sweet Pea in Sucker Punch (2011), Lindy in Limitless (2011), Clara Murphy in RoboCop (2014), and Sarah Wilson in Geostorm (2017). She worked with writer/director Martin McDonagh in Seven Psychopaths (2012) and Three Billboards Outside Ebbing, Missouri (2017). For the latter, Cornish won her first Screen Actors Guild Award as part of the cast. In 2018, she portrayed Cathy Mueller in the first season of Amazon Video series Jack Ryan opposite John Krasinski, a role she reprised in the fourth and final season in 2023. She also played Dixy in the film The Virtuoso (2021) alongside Anthony Hopkins.

== Early life ==
Abbie Cornish was born on 7 August 1982 in Lochinvar, New South Wales, as the second of five children of Shelley and Barry Cornish. Her sister, Isabelle Cornish, is also an actress. She grew up on a 70-hectare (170-acre) farm before moving to Newcastle. As a teenager, Cornish was fascinated by independent and foreign films.

== Acting career ==
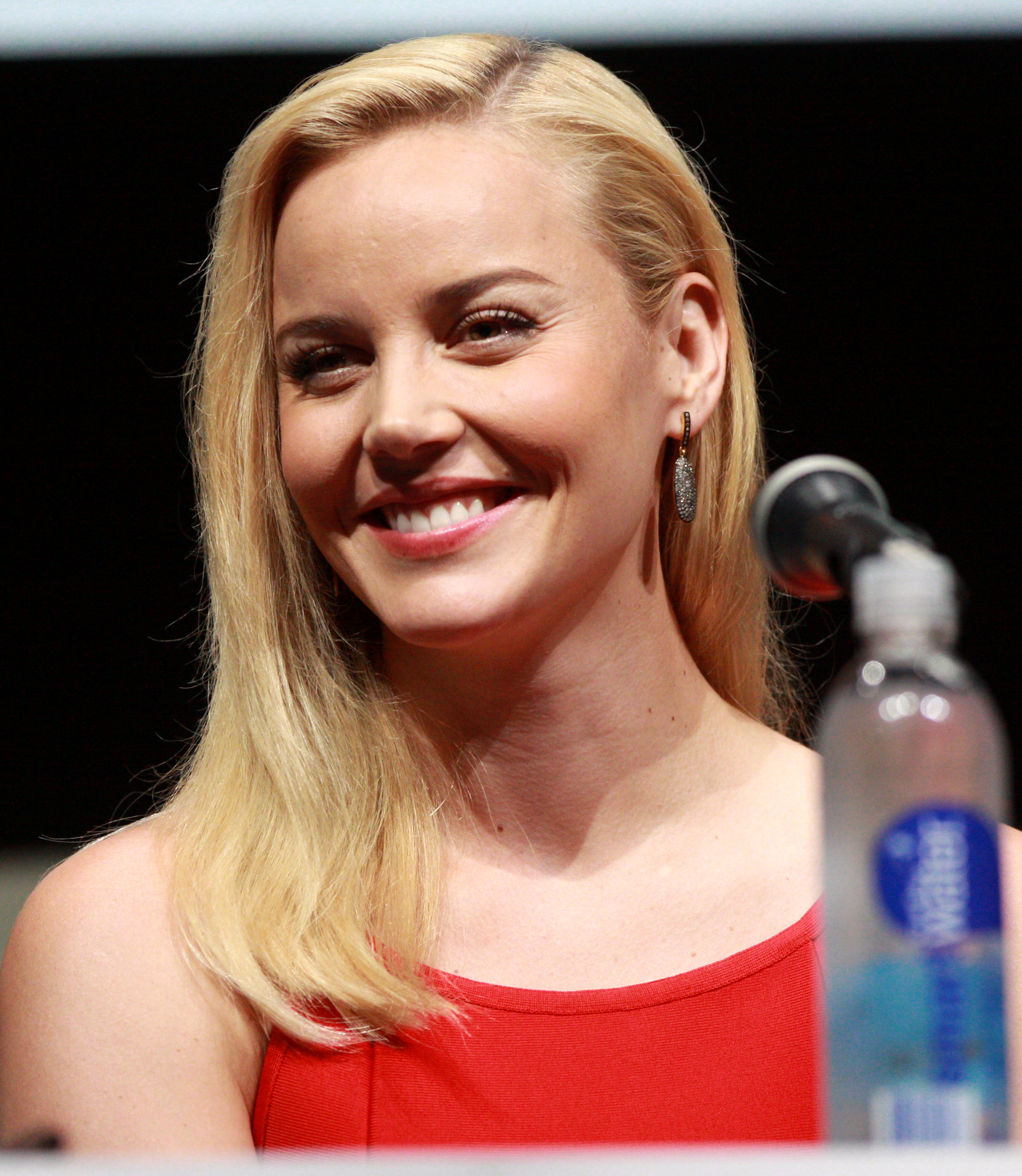
Cornish at the 2013 San Diego Comic-Con

Cornish began modelling at age 13 after reaching the finals of a Dolly Magazine competition. In 1999, Cornish was awarded the Australian Film Institute Young Actor's Award for her role in the Australian Broadcasting Corporation's television show Wildside and was offered her first role in a feature film, The Monkey's Mask.

In 2001, Cornish played Penne in the first season of Life Support, a satirical, sometimes dark look at Australian life as seen through the omnipresent lens of a television lifestyle show.

In 2004, Cornish appeared in the award-winning short film Everything Goes with Hugo Weaving. She received the Australian Film Institute Award for Best Actress in a Leading Role, Best Actress at the FCCA and Inside Film Awards and Best Breakthrough Performance at the 2005 Miami International Film Festival for her role in Somersault. Cornish received critical acclaim for her role in Candy, opposite Heath Ledger. She has also starred in A Good Year, Elizabeth: The Golden Age and Kimberly Peirce's Stop-Loss. She garnered widespread acclaim for her starring performance as Fanny Brawne in Jane Campion's 2009 film about the Romantic poet John Keats, Bright Star. In April 2010, Cornish was cast in Limitless, the film adaptation of the novel The Dark Fields, directed by Neil Burger and also starring Bradley Cooper and Robert De Niro.

Cornish narrated Zack Snyder's film Sucker Punch, in which she played one of the protagonists.

Cornish played the role of Wally in Madonna's film W.E., about Edward VIII and Wallis Simpson. In 2012, she replaced Emily Blunt in the independent film The Girl, which premiered at the Tribeca Film Festival, and starred alongside Woody Harrelson and Colin Farrell in the crime comedy Seven Psychopaths. Cornish co-starred in the 2014 RoboCop reboot, as Clara Murphy, the wife of protagonist Alex Murphy (Joel Kinnaman).

In 2015, she played Agent Katherine Cowles in Solace, a mystery thriller film directed by Afonso Poyart with central performances by Anthony Hopkins, Colin Farrell, and Jeffrey Dean Morgan.

In 2016, she filmed The Girl Who Invented Kissing with Luke Wilson.

In 2017, she played Agent Sarah Wilson in the science fiction disaster film Geostorm, directed, co-written, and co-produced by Dean Devlin, also starring Gerard Butler, Jim Sturgess, Ed Harris, and Andy García.

In 2018, she starred in Tom Clancy's Jack Ryan as Cathy Mueller, alongside John Krasinski.

In 2019, she starred in the Australian television miniseries Secret Bridesmaids' Business along with Katie McGrath and Georgina Haig.

In 2021, she starred in Dakota with Tim Rozon, Patrick Muldoon and William Baldwin for director Kirk Harris.

== Music career ==
Cornish is also a rapper, singer and songwriter. She has been rapping under the name Dusk since 2000 and was part of Australian hip hop group Blades from age 18 to 22. In 2015, Cornish supported American rapper Nas on his Australian tour. The same year, she released two new tracks on SoundCloud: "Evolve" featuring Jane Tyrrell and "Way Back Home", which was produced by Suffa from Hilltop Hoods. The songs were re-released in 2020, and her first EP, Key of the Sun, was released in 2021.

=== Discography ===
- "Evolve" - Single, 2020
- "Way Back Home" - Single, 2020
- "MVP" - Single, 2020
- "Zombies" - Single, 2020
- Key of the Sun - EP, 2021
- "I'll Be There For You" - Single, 2021

== Activism ==
In 2006, Cornish became an ambassador for Australian animal rights group Voiceless, the animal-protection institute, and was part of a national advertising campaign in 2012. Cornish is a dairy-free pescetarian who advocates for plant-based diets and co-authored Pescan: A Feel Good Cookbook with Jacqueline King Schiller in 2019.

== Personal life ==
Cornish dated actor Ryan Phillippe in 2006, shortly before his separation from actress Reese Witherspoon. They split in 2010. In 2019, she announced her engagement to mixed martial artist Adel Altamimi.

== Filmography ==
=== Film ===
| Year | Title | Role | Notes |
|---|---|---|---|
| 2000 | The Monkey's Mask | Mickey Norris | |
| 2003 | Horseplay | Becky Wodinski | |
| 2004 | One Perfect Day | Emma Matisse | |
| 2004 | Somersault | Heidi | Australian Film Institute Award for Best Actress in a Leading Role; Film Critics Circle of Australia Award for Best Actress; Inside Film Award for Best Actress; Miami Film Festival: Breakthrough Award |
| 2004 | Everything Goes | Brianie | Short film |
| 2006 | Candy | Candy | Nominated—Australian Film Institute Awards for Best Actress in a Leading Role; Nominated—Inside Film Awards for Best Actress; Won—Film Critics Circle of Australia for Best Actress in a Lead Role |
| 2006 | A Good Year | Christie Roberts | |
| 2007 | Elizabeth: The Golden Age | Bess Throckmorton | |
| 2008 | Stop-Loss | Michelle Overton | |
| 2009 | Bright Star | Fanny Brawne | Nominated—Australian Film Institute Award for Best Actress in a Leading Role; Nominated—British Independent Film Award for Best Actress; Nominated—Chicago Film Critics Association Award for Best Actress; Nominated—Denver Film Critics Society Award for Best Actress; Nominated—Houston Film Critics Society Award for Best Actress; Nominated—International Cinephile Society Award for Best Actress (Runner-up); Nominated—London Film Critics Circle Award for Actress of the Year; Nominated—National Society of Film Critics Award for Best Actress (2nd Runner-up); Nominated—San Diego Film Critics Society Award for Best Actress (Runner-up); Nominated—Satellite Award for Best Actress – Motion Picture Drama |
| 2010 | Legend of the Guardians: The Owls of Ga'Hoole | Otulissa | Voice only |
| 2011 | Limitless | Lindy | |
| 2011 | Sucker Punch | Sweet Pea | |
| 2011 | W.E. | Wally Winthrop | |
| 2012 | The Girl | Ashley | |
| 2012 | Seven Psychopaths | Kaya | |
| 2014 | RoboCop | Clara Murphy | |
| 2015 | Solace | Agent Katherine Cowles | Direct-to-video |
| 2016 | Lavender | Jane | Direct-to-video |
| 2017 | The Girl Who Invented Kissing | Patti | |
| 2017 | 6 Days | Kate Adie | |
| 2017 | Three Billboards Outside Ebbing, Missouri | Anne Willoughby | Screen Actors Guild Award for Outstanding Performance by a Cast in a Motion Picture; Nominated—AACTA International Award for Best Supporting Actress |
| 2017 | Geostorm | Agent Sarah Wilson | |
| 2018 | Where Hands Touch | Kerstin | |
| 2018 | Paris Song | Lee Abbott | |
| 2018 | Perfect | Mother | |
| 2021 | The Virtuoso | The Waitress | |
| 2022 | Blackout | Anna | |
| 2022 | Dakota | Kate Sanders | |
| 2024 | Detained | Rebecca Kamen | Also executive producer |
| 2025 | I'm Beginning to See the Light | Hannah | |
| 2026 | Whale Shark Jack | Nita | |
| 2026 | Trust Me, I'm a Doctor | Anna Nicole Smith | |

=== Television ===
| Year | Title | Role | Notes |
|---|---|---|---|
| 1997 | Wildside | Simone Summers | Australian Film Institute Award for Best Young Actor |
| 1999 | Close Contact | Sara Boyack | |
| 2000 | Water Rats | Marie Marchand | 1 episode |
| 2001 | Outriders | Reggie McDowell | 26 episodes |
| 2001 | Life Support | Penne No. 1 | 10 episodes |
| 2003 | White Collar Blue | Antonia McAlister | |
| 2003 | Marking Time | Tracey | Nominated—Australian Film Institute Award for Best Guest or Supporting Actress in Television Drama or Comedy |
| 2014 | Klondike | Belinda Mulrooney | Miniseries; 6 episodes |
| 2018; 2023 | Jack Ryan | Cathy Mueller | Main role; 14 episodes (season 1 & 4) |
| 2019 | Secret Bridesmaids' Business | Melanie | Miniseries; 6 episodes |
| 2026 | Invisible | Emma Le Roux | Main Cast |

== Selected publications ==
- Pescan: A Feel Good Cookbook (2019, Abrams Books) ISBN 9781419734670
