= Tess Gallagher =

American poet, essayist and writer

- Born: July 21, 1943 (age 83); Port Angeles, Washington, U.S.
- Education: University of Washington; Iowa Writer's Workshop
- Spouse: Raymond Carver (m. 1988; died 1988)
- Writing career
- Notable awards: Guggenheim Fellowship (1978); Two National Endowment for the Arts awards Maxine Cushing Gray Foundation Award; Elliston Award; International Fondazione Roma di poesia Prize for Lifetime Achievement in Poetry

Tess Gallagher (born 1943) is an American poet, essayist, and short story writer. Among her many honors were a fellowship from the Guggenheim Foundation, National Endowment for the Arts award, and the Maxine Cushing Gray Foundation Award. In 2023, Gallagher became the first American writer to have been awarded the prestigious international Fondazione Roma di poesia Prize for Lifetime Achievement in Poetry."Tess Gallagher". poets.org.

== Biography ==
Gallagher was born in Port Angeles, Washington to logger and longshoreman Leslie Bond and gardener mother Georgia Bond. She studied with poet-intellectual Theodore Roethke in the University of Washington, earning both a bachelor’s and a master’s degree in English. She also attended the Iowa Writers' Workshop, where she made films.

In November 1977 Gallagher met Raymond Carver, a short story writer and poet, at a writers' conference in Dallas, Texas and their relationship very much influenced her literary work, which included helping to edit and publish his writing. Beginning in January 1979, Carver and Gallagher lived together in El Paso, Texas, in a borrowed cabin near Port Angeles, Washington, and in Tucson, Arizona. In 1980, the two moved to Syracuse, New York, where Gallagher had been appointed the coordinator of the creative writing program at Syracuse University; Carver taught as a professor in the English department. They jointly purchased a house in Syracuse, at 832 Maryland Avenue. In ensuing years, the house became so popular that the couple had to hang a sign outside that read "Writers At Work" in order to be left alone.

In 1988, six weeks prior to his death, Carver and Gallagher married in Reno, Nevada.

Tess Gallagher spends part of her time living in a cottage in County Sligo, Ireland, and collaborated with her long-time Irish partner, Josie Gray, until his death in 2017. Gray was a storyteller and a painter in the northwest of Ireland. Gray and Gallagher published two oral story collections called "Barnacle Soup," and "Surrounded by Weasels," the latter of which was published by Cirque Press in 2025.

=== Raymond Carver and poetry ===
Raymond Carver influenced her to write the short stories that were collected in The Lover of Horses (1986).

She wrote Moon Crossing Bridge, a collection of love poems dedicated to Raymond Carver, who died in 1988.

She published the essay "Instead of Dying" in The Sun Magazine about Raymond Carver's life.

=== Distant Rain: A Conversation Between Jakucho Setouchi and Tess Gallagher ===
Distant Rain, published in 2006, is a conversation between Tess and Jakucho Setouchi, a Buddhist nun from Kyoto, that happened in Japan in 1990. They spoke about poetry, Tess Gallagher's grief about Raymond Carver, and differences between cultures.

=== Boogie-Woogie Crisscross ===
Tess Gallagher wrote the book of poetry Boogie-Woogie Crisscross in collaboration with Lawrence Matsuda. They sent each other emails with new poetry and ideas, then from these correspondences was gathered the book. The collaboration started when Alfredo Arreguin, Tess Gallagher's friend, gave her poetry by Lawrence Matsuda's about World War II and Japanese who were imprisoned in camp Minidoka located in the western United States. Tess Gallagher helped Lawrence Matsuda to find a publisher for the poetry about Minidoka and this was how their literary friendship began.

=== Teaching career ===
Gallagher has taught at various institutions including St. Lawrence University, University of Montana, University of Arizona, Syracuse University, Bucknell University, and Whitman College.

== Selected works ==
=== Poetry ===
Collections

- Stepping outside : poems. Lisbon, Iowa: Penumbra Press. 1974.
- Instructions To The Double. Graywolf Press. 1975. ISBN 978-0-91530-803-3.
- Under Stars. Graywolf Press. 1978. ISBN 978-0-915308-19-4.
- Willingly. Graywolf Press. 1984. ISBN 978-0-915308-46-0.
- The Hug. 1984.
- Amplitude. Graywolf Press. 1987. ISBN 978-1-55597-099-4.
- Moon Crossing Bridge. Graywolf Press. 1992. ISBN 978-1-55597-156-4.
- I Stop Writing the Poem. 1992.
- Portable Kisses. Capra Press. 1992. ISBN 978-0-88496-342-4.
- My Black Horse. Bloodaxe. 1995. ISBN 978-1-85224-306-7.
- Dear Ghosts (Poetry Finalist for 2007 Washington State Book Award). Graywolf Press. 2006. ISBN 9781555974435.
- Midnight Lantern: New and Selected Poems. Graywolf Press. 2011. ISBN 978-1-55597-597-5.
- Gallagher, Tess; Matsuda, Lawrence (March 31, 2016). Boogie-Woogie Crisscross. Madhat, Inc. / Plume Editions. ISBN 978-1941196298.
- Is, Is Not:Poems. Graywolf Press. 2019. ISBN 978-1-55597-841-9.

=== Short fiction ===
Collections

- The Lover of Horses. Harper & Row. 1986. ISBN 978-0-06-091435-6.
- At The Owl Woman Saloon. Simon & Schuster [Scribner]. 1999 [1997]. ISBN 978-0-684-84756-6.
- The Man From Kinvara: Selected Stories. Graywolf Press. 2009. ISBN 978-1-55597-537-1.

Stories

| Title | Year | First published | Reprinted/collected | Notes |
|---|---|---|---|---|
| The Poetry Baron | 1997 | "The Poetry Baron". The Atlantic Monthly. 280 (1): 79–86. July 1997. | | |

=== Essay collections ===
- A concert of tenses: essays on poetry. University of Michigan Press. 1986. ISBN 978-0-472-09370-0.
- Soul Barnacles. University of Michigan Press. 2003. ISBN 978-0-472-08912-3.

=== Other works ===
- With Raymond Carver (December 1985). "Dostoevsky: A Screenplay" & "King Dog a Screenplay" (Paperback ed.). Capra Back-to-Back Series.
- Words Like Distant Rain (2006)
- With Josie Gray (January 2009). Barnacle Soup and Other Stories from the West of Ireland. Eastern Washington University Press. ISBN 978-1597660365.

=== Anthologies ===
- Patrice Vecchione, ed. (2002). "Sudden Journey". The Body Eclectic: An Anthology of Poems. Macmillan. ISBN 978-0-8050-6935-8.
