= Raymond Carver bibliography =

The bibliography of Raymond Carver consists of 72 short stories, 306 poems, a novel fragment, a one-act play, a screenplay co-written with Tess Gallagher, and 32 pieces of non-fiction (essays, a meditation, introductions, and book reviews). In 2009, the 17 stories collected in What We Talk About When We Talk About Love were published in their manuscript form, prior to Gordon Lish's extensive editing, under the title Beginners.

== Complete works ==
Raymond Carver's complete published works are collected in the following volumes:

- Collected Stories (Library of America, 2009) - includes the complete fiction (72 short stories, 1 novel fragment, 17 manuscript versions)^{1}
- All of Us (Vintage, 2000) - includes the complete poetry (306 poems)
- Call If You Need Me: The Uncollected Fiction and Other Prose (Vintage, 2001) - includes the complete non-fiction (5 essays, 1 meditation, 8 comments on work, 6 introductions, 12 book reviews)^{2}

^{1}The book also includes 4 essays
^{2}The book also includes 11 works of fiction

Two texts which are not included in any of the collections above were published separately:

- Dostoevsky (Capra, 1985) - screenplay (co-written with Tess Gallagher)
- Carnations (Engdahl Typography, 1992) - a one-act play.

== Books ==
Title	Publisher	Contents	Notes
Near Klamath	Sacramento: English Club of Sacramento State College (1968)		
Winter Insomnia	Santa Cruz: Kayak (1970)		
At Night the Salmon Move	Santa Barbara: Capra (1976)		
Will You Please Be Quiet, Please?	New York: McGraw-Hill (1976)	22 short stories	
Furious Seasons and Other Stories	Santa Barbara: Capra (1977)	8 short stories	
What We Talk About When We Talk About Love	New York: Knopf (1981)	17 short stories	
Fires: Essays, Poems, Stories	Santa Barbara: Capra (1983); New York: Vintage (1984); New York: Vintage Contemporaries (1989)	2 essays, 50 poems, 7 short stories	
Cathedral	New York: Knopf (1983); London: Collins (1984)	12 short stories	
Dostoevsky	Santa Barbara: Capra (1985)	A Screenplay	Written with Tess Gallagher
Where Water Comes Together with Other Water	New York: Random House (1985)	80 poems	
Ultramarine	New York: Random House (1986)	84 poems	
Where I'm Calling From: New and Selected Stories	New York: Atlantic Monthly (1988); Franklin Center, PA: Franklin Library (1988)	37 short stories	
A New Path to the Waterfall	New York: Atlantic Monthly (1989)	73 poems	
No Heroics, Please: Uncollected Writings	London: Collins Harvill (1991); New York: Vintage Contemporaries (1992)	stories, 19 poems and book reviews	
Short Cuts: Selected Stories	New York: Vintage (1993)	9 short stories, 1 poem	Released to accompany Short Cuts film (1993)
All of Us: The Collected Poems	New York: Vintage (2000)	306 poems	
Call If You Need Me: The Uncollected Fiction and Other Prose	New York: Vintage (2001)	10 stories, 1 novel fragment, 32 pieces of nonfiction	
Collected Stories	New York: Library of America (2009)	90 stories, 4 essays, 1 novel fragment	

=== British editions ===
Title	Publisher	Contents	Notes
The Stories of Raymond Carver	London: Picador (1985)	51 stories	Complete contents of Will You Please Be Quiet, Please?, What We Talk About When We; Talk About Love, and Cathedral
In a Marine Light: Selected Poems	London: Collins Harvill, (1987)		
Elephant and Other Stories	London: Collins Harvill (1988)	7 short stories	Includes the 7 new stories collected in Where I'm Calling From
Beginners	London: Chatto Bodley Head & Cape (2009)	17 stories	Manuscript version of stories included in What We Talk About When We Talk About Love

=== Chapbooks and limited editions ===
Title	Publisher	Contents
Put Yourself in My Shoes	Santa Barbara: Capra (1974)	1 short story
The Pheasant	Worcester, MA: Metacom (1982)	1 short story
Two Poems	Salisbury, MD: Scarab (1982)	2 poems
If It Please You	Northridge, CA: Lord John (1984)	1 short story
My Father's Life	Derry, NH: Babcock & Koontz (1986)	Biographical essay
Two Poems	Concord, NH: Ewert (1986)	2 poems
Those Days: Early Writings by Raymond Carver	Elmwood, CT: Raven (1987)	11 poems, 1 short story

== Short stories ==
Title	Originally published in	Collected in:	Notes
"Fat"	Harper's Bazaar, September 1971	Will You Please Be Quiet, Please? (1976); Where I'm Calling From (1988); Collected Stories (2009)	
"Neighbors"	Esquire, June 1971	Will You Please Be Quiet, Please? (1976); Where I'm Calling From (1988); Collected Stories (2009)	
"The Idea"	Northwest Review, 1971-72	Will You Please Be Quiet, Please? (1976); Collected Stories (2009)	
"They're Not Your Husband"	Chicago Review, 1973	Will You Please Be Quiet, Please? (1976); Where I'm Calling From (1988); Collected Stories (2009)	
"Are You a Doctor?"	Fiction, 1973	Will You Please Be Quiet, Please? (1976); Collected Stories (2009)	
"The Father"	Toyon, 1961	Will You Please Be Quiet, Please? (1976); Collected Stories (2009)	
"Nobody Said Anything"	Seneca Review, 1970	Will You Please Be Quiet, Please? (1976); Where I'm Calling From (1988); Collected Stories (2009)	
"Sixty Acres"	Discourse, 1969	Will You Please Be Quiet, Please? (1976); Collected Stories (2009)	
"What's in Alaska?"	Iowa Review, 1972	Will You Please Be Quiet, Please? (1976); Where I'm Calling From (1988); Collected Stories (2009)	
"Night School"	North American Review, 1971	Will You Please Be Quiet, Please? (1976); Collected Stories (2009)	
"Collectors"	Esquire, August 1975	Will You Please Be Quiet, Please? (1976); Where I'm Calling From (1988); Collected Stories (2009)	
"What Do You Do in San Francisco?"	Colorado State Review, 1967	Will You Please Be Quiet, Please? (1976); Where I'm Calling From (1988); Collected Stories (2009)	
"The Student's Wife"	Carolina Quarterly, 1964	Will You Please Be Quiet, Please? (1976); Where I'm Calling From (1988); Collected Stories (2009)	
"Put Yourself in My Shoes"	Iowa Review, 1972	Will You Please Be Quiet, Please? (1976); Where I'm Calling From (1988); Collected Stories (2009)	
"Jerry and Molly and Sam"	Perspective, 1972	Will You Please Be Quiet, Please? (1976); Collected Stories (2009)	
"Why, Honey?"	Sou'wester, 1972	Will You Please Be Quiet, Please? (1976); Where I'm Calling From (1988); Collected Stories (2009)	
"The Ducks"	Carolina Quarterly, 1963	Will You Please Be Quiet, Please? (1976); Collected Stories (2009)	
"How About This?"	Western Humanities Review, 1970	Will You Please Be Quiet, Please? (1976); Collected Stories (2009)	
"Bicycles, Muscles, Cigarets"	Kansas Quarterly, 1973	Will You Please Be Quiet, Please? (1976); Where I'm Calling From (1988); Collected Stories (2009)	
"What Is It?"	Esquire, 1972	Will You Please Be Quiet, Please? (1976); Where I'm Calling From (1988); Collected Stories (2009)	Titled "Are These Actual Miles?" in Where I'm Calling From (1988)
"Signals"	December, 1970	Will You Please Be Quiet, Please? (1976); Collected Stories (2009)	
"Will You Please Be Quiet, Please?"	December, 1966	Will You Please Be Quiet, Please? (1976); Collected Stories (2009)	
"Pastoral"	Western Humanities Review, Winter 1963	Furious Seasons and Other Stories (1977); Collected Stories (2009)	
"Furious Seasons"	Selection, Winter 1960-1961	Furious Seasons and Other Stories (1977); Collected Stories (2009)	
"Why Don't You Dance?"	Quarterly West, 1978	What We Talk About When We Talk About Love (1981); Where I'm Calling From (1988); Collected Stories (2009)	Manuscript version appears in Beginners (2009) and Collected Stories (2009).
"Viewfinder"	Quarterly West, 1978	What We Talk About When We Talk About Love (1981); Collected Stories (2009)	Manuscript version appears in Beginners (2009) and Collected Stories (2009).
"Mr. Coffee and Mr. Fixit"	TriQuarterly, 1980	What We Talk About When We Talk About Love (1981); Collected Stories (2009)	Manuscript version appears in Beginners (2009) and Collected Stories (2009).
"Gazebo"	Missouri Review, 1980	What We Talk About When We Talk About Love (1981); Where I'm Calling From (1988); Collected Stories (2009)	Manuscript version appears in Beginners (2009) and Collected Stories (2009).
"I Could See the Smallest Things"	Missouri Review, 1980	What We Talk About When We Talk About Love (1981); Collected Stories (2009)	Manuscript version appears in Beginners (2009) and Collected Stories (2009).
"Sacks"	Perspective, 1974	What We Talk About When We Talk About Love (1981); Collected Stories (2009)	Manuscript version appears in Beginners (2009) and Collected Stories (2009).
"The Bath"	Columbia, 1981	What We Talk About When We Talk About Love (1981); Collected Stories (2009)	Manuscript version appears in Beginners (2009) and Collected Stories (2009). Republished as "A Small, Good Thing" in rewritten and expanded form in Cathedral.
"Tell the Women We're Going"	Sou'wester, 1971	What We Talk About When We Talk About Love (1981); Collected Stories (2009)	Manuscript version appears in Beginners (2009) and Collected Stories (2009).
"After the Denim"	New England Review, 1981	What We Talk About When We Talk About Love (1981); Collected Stories (2009)	Manuscript version appears in Beginners (2009) and Collected Stories (2009).
"So Much Water So Close to Home"	Spectrum, 1975	What We Talk About When We Talk About Love (1981); Where I'm Calling From (1988); Collected Stories (2009)	Manuscript version appears in Beginners (2009) and Collected Stories (2009).
"The Third Thing That Killed My Father"	Discourse, 1967	What We Talk About When We Talk About Love (1981); Where I'm Calling From (1988); Collected Stories (2009)	Manuscript version appears in Beginners (2009) and Collected Stories (2009).
"A Serious Talk"	Playgirl, 1980	What We Talk About When We Talk About Love (1981); Where I'm Calling From (1988); Collected Stories (2009)	Manuscript version appears in Beginners (2009) and Collected Stories (2009).
"The Calm"	Iowa Review, 1979	What We Talk About When We Talk About Love (1981); Collected Stories (2009)	Manuscript version appears in Beginners (2009) and Collected Stories (2009).
"Popular Mechanics"	Playgirl, March 1978	What We Talk About When We Talk About Love (1981); Where I'm Calling From (1988); Collected Stories (2009)	Titled "Little Things" in Where I'm Calling From (1988); manuscript version titled "Mine" appears in Beginners (2009) and Collected Stories (2009).
"Everything Stuck to Him"	Chariton Review, Fall 1975 (as "Distance")	Furious Seasons and Other Stories (1977); Fires (1983); What We Talk About When We Talk About Love (1981); Where I'm Calling From (1988); Collected Stories (2009)	Titled "Distance" in Where I'm Calling From (1988); Manuscript version titled "Distance" appears in Beginners (2009) and Collected Stories (2009).
"What We Talk About When We Talk About Love"	Antaeus, 1981	What We Talk About When We Talk About Love (1981); Where I'm Calling From (1988); Collected Stories (2009)	Manuscript version appears in Beginners (2009) and Collected Stories (2009).
"One More Thing"	North American Review, 1979	What We Talk About When We Talk About Love (1981); Where I'm Calling From (1988); Collected Stories (2009)	Manuscript version appears in Beginners (2009) and Collected Stories (2009).
"The Lie"	Sou'wester, 1971	Fires (1983); Collected Stories (2009)	
"The Cabin"	Western Humanities Review, 1963	Fires (1983); Collected Stories (2009)	
"Harry's Death"	Eureka Review, 1975-76	Fires (1983); Collected Stories (2009)	
"The Pheasant"	Occident, 1973	Fires (1983); Collected Stories (2009)	
"Feathers"	The Atlantic Monthly, September 1982	Cathedral (1983); Collected Stories (2009)	
"Chef's House"	The New Yorker, November 30, 1981	Cathedral (1983); Collected Stories (2009)	
"Preservation"	Grand Street, 1983	Cathedral (1983); Collected Stories (2009)	
"The Compartment"	Granta, June 1983	Cathedral (1983); Collected Stories (2009)	
"A Small, Good Thing"	Columbia, 1981	Cathedral (1983); Collected Stories (2009)	Originally published as "The Bath" in What We Talk About When We Talk About; Love in a shorter form.
"Vitamins"	Granta, March 1981	Cathedral (1983); Collected Stories (2009)	
"Careful"	The Paris Review, 1983	Cathedral (1983); Collected Stories (2009)	
"Where I'm Calling From"	The New Yorker, March 15, 1982	Cathedral (1983); Collected Stories (2009)	
"The Train"	Antaeus, 1983	Cathedral (1983); Collected Stories (2009)	
"Fever"	North American Review, 1983	Cathedral (1983); Collected Stories (2009)	
"The Bridle"	The New Yorker, July 19, 1982	Cathedral (1983); Collected Stories (2009)	
"Cathedral"	The Atlantic Monthly, September 1981	Cathedral (1983); Where I'm Calling From (1988); Collected Stories (2009)	
"Boxes"	The New Yorker, February 24, 1986	Where I'm Calling From (1988); Elephant and Other Stories (1988); Collected Stories (2009)	
"Whoever Was Using This Bed"	The New Yorker, April 28, 1986	Where I'm Calling From (1988); Elephant and Other Stories (1988); Collected Stories (2009)	
"Intimacy"	Esquire, August 1986	Where I'm Calling From (1988); Elephant and Other Stories (1988); Collected Stories (2009)	
"Menudo"	Granta, 1987	Where I'm Calling From (1988); Elephant and Other Stories (1988); Collected Stories (2009)	
"Elephant"	The New Yorker, June 9, 1986	Where I'm Calling From (1988); Elephant and Other Stories (1988); Collected Stories (2009)	
"Blackbird Pie"	The New Yorker, July 7, 1986	Where I'm Calling From (1988); Elephant and Other Stories (1988); Collected Stories (2009)	
"Errand"	The New Yorker, June 1, 1987	Where I'm Calling From (1988); Elephant and Other Stories (1988); Collected Stories (2009)	
"The Hair"	Toyon, 1963	Call If You Need Me (2000); Collected Stories (2009)	
"The Aficionados"	Toyon, 1963	Call If You Need Me (2000); Collected Stories (2009)	
"Poseidon and Company"	Toyon, 1963	Call If You Need Me (2000); Collected Stories (2009)	
"Bright Red Apples"	Gato Magazine, 1967	Call If You Need Me (2000); Collected Stories (2009)	
"Kindling"	Esquire, July 1999	Call If You Need Me (2000); Collected Stories (2009)	
"What Would You Like to See?"	The Guardian, June 24, 2000	Call If You Need Me (2000); Collected Stories (2009)	
"Dreams"	Esquire, August 2000	Call If You Need Me (2000); Collected Stories (2009)	
"Vandals"	Esquire, October 1999	Call If You Need Me (2000); Collected Stories (2009)	
"Call If You Need Me"	Granta, 1999	Call If You Need Me (2000); Collected Stories (2009)	

== Poetry ==
Carver's 306 poems are collected in All Of Us (1996) after previously appearing in the collections: Near Klamath (1968), Winter Insomnia (1970), At Night The Salmon Move (1976), Fires (1983), Where Water Comes Together With Other Water (1985), This Water (1985), Ultramarine (1986), Early For The Dance (1986), Those Days: Early Writings By Raymond Carver: Eleven Poems And A Story (1987), In A Marine Light: Selected Poems (1987), A New Path To The Waterfall (1989), and No Heroics, Please (1991).

Notable poems include "Photograph of My Father in His Twenty-Second Year", which grew out of the essay "My Father's Life", and "Gravy", which was published in The New Yorker in August 1988 following Carver's death. The poems "Late Fragment" and "Gravy" are both inscribed on his tombstone.

=== The poems ===
- "Drinking while Driving"
- "Luck"
- "Distress Sale"
- "Your Dog Dies"
- "Photograph of My Father in His Twenty-Second Year"
- "Hamid Ramouz (1818–1906)"
- "Bankruptcy"
- "The Baker"
- "Iowa Summer"
- "Alcohol"
- "For Semra, with Martial Vigor"
- "Looking for Work 1"
- "Cheers"
- "Rogue River Jet-Boat Trip, Gold Beach, Oregon, July 4, 1977"
- "You Don't Know What Love Is"
- "Morning, Thinking of Empire"
- "The Blue Stones"
- "Tel Aviv and Life on the Mississippi"
- "The News Carried to Macedonia"
- "The Mosque in Jaffa"
- "Not Far from Here"
- "Sudden Rain"
- "Balzac"
- "Country Matters"
- "This Room"
- "Rhodes"
- "Spring, 480 BC"
- "Near Klamath"
- "Autumn"
- "Winter Insomnia"
- "Prosser"
- "At Night the Salmon Move"
- "With a Telescope Rod on Cowiche Creek"
- "Poem for Dr Pratt, a Lady Pathologist"
- "Wes Hardin: from a Photograph"
- "Marriage"
- "The Other Life"
- "The Mailman as Cancer Patient"
- "Poem for Hemingway & WC Williams"
- "Torture"
- "Bobber"
- "Highway 99e from Chico"
- "The Cougar"
- "The Current"
- "Hunter"
- "Trying to Sleep Late on a Saturday Morning in November"
- "Louise"
- "Poem for Karl Wallenda, Aerialist Supreme"
- "Deschutes River"
- "Forever"
- "Woolworth’s, 1954"
- "Radio Waves"
- "Movement"
- "Hominy and Rain"
- "The Road"
- "Fear"
- "Romanticism"
- "The Ashtray"
- "Still Looking Out for Number One"
- "Where Water Comes Together With Other Water"
- "Happiness"
- "The Old Days"
- "Our first House in Sacramento"
- "Next Year"
- "To My Daughter"
- "Anathema"
- "Energy"
- "Locking Yourself Out, Then Trying to Get Back In"
- "Medicine"
- "Wenas Ridge"
- "Reading"
- "Rain"
- "Money"
- "Aspens"
- "At Least"
- "The Grant"
- "My Boat"
- "The Poem I Didn't Write"
- "Work"
- "In The Year 2020"
- "The Juggler at Heaven’s Gate"
- "My Daughter and Apple Pie"
- "Commerce"
- "The Fishing Pole of the Drowned Man"
- "A Walk"
- "My Dad’s Wallet"
- "Ask Him"
- "Next Door"
- "The Caucasus: a Romance"
- "A Forge, and a Scythe"
- "The Pipe"
- "Listening"
- "In Switzerland
- "A Squall"
- "My Crow"
- "The Party"
- "After Rainy Days"
- "Interview"
- "Blood"
- "Tomorrow"
- "Grief"
- "Harley’s Swans"
- "Elk Camp"
- "The Windows of the Summer Vacation Houses"
- "Memory 1"
- "Away"
- "Music"
- "Plus"
- "All Her Life"
- "The Hat"
- "Late Night with Fog and Horses"
- "Venice"
- "The Eve of Battle"
- "Extirpation"
- "The Catch"
- "My Death"
- "To Begin With"
- "The Cranes"
- "A Haircut"
- "Happiness in Cornwall"
- "Afghanistan"
- "In a Marine Light Near Sequim, Washington"
- "Eagles"
- "Yesterday, snow"
- "Reading Something in the Restaurant"
- "A Poem Not Against Songbirds"
- "Late Afternoon, April 8, 1984"
- "My work"
- "The Trestle"
- "For Tess"
- "This Morning"
- "What You Need for Painting"
- "An Afternoon"
- "Circulation"
- "The Cobweb"
- "Balsa Wood"
- "The Projectile"
- "The Mail"
- "The Autopsy Room"
- "Where They’d Lived"
- "Memory 2"
- "The Car"
- "Stupid"
- "Union Street: San Francisco, Summer 1975"
- "Bonnard’s Nudes"
- "Jean’s TV"
- "Mesopotamia"
- "The Jungle"
- "Hope"
- "The House Behind This One"
- "Limits"
- "The Sensitive Girl"
- "The minuet"
- "Egress"
- "Spell"
- "From the East, Light"
- "A Tall Order"
- "The Author of Her Misfortune"
- "Powder-Monkey"
- "Earwigs"
- "Nyquil"
- "The Possible"
- "Shiftless"
- "The Young Fire Eaters of Mexico City"
- " Where the Groceries Went"
- "What I Can Do"
- "The Little Room"
- "Sweet Light"
- "The Garden"
- "Son"
- "Kafka’s Watch"
- "The Lightning Speed of the Past"
- "Vigil"
- "In the Lobby of the Hotel del Mayo"
- "Bahia, Brazil"
- "The Phenomenon"
- "Wind"
- "Migration"
- "Sleeping"
- "The River"
- "The Best Time of the Day"
- "Scale"
- "Company"
- "Yesterday"
- "The Schooldesk"
- "Cutlery"
- "The Pen"
- "The Prize"
- "An Account"
- "The Meadow"
- "Loafing"
- "Sinew"
- "Waiting"
- "The Debate"
- "Its Course"
- "September"
- "The White Field"
- "Shooting"
- "The Window"
- "Heels"
- "The Phone Booth"
- "Cadillacs and Poetry"
- "Simple"
- "The Scratch"
- "Mother"
- "The Child"
- "The Fields"
- "After Reading Two Towns in Provence"
- "Evening"
- "The Rest"
- "Slippers"
- "Asia"
- "The Gift"
- "Wet Picture - Jaroslav Seifert"
- "Thermopylae"
- "Two Worlds"
- "Smoke and Deception - Anton Chekhov"
- "In a Greek Orthodox Church Near Daphne"
- "For the Record"
- "Transformation"
- "Threat"
- "Conspirators"
- "This Word Love"
- "Don’t Run - Anton Chekhov"
- "Woman Bathing"
- "The Name - Tomas Transtromer"
- "Looking for Work 2"
- "The World Book Salesman"
- "The Toes"
- "The Moon, the Train"
- "Two Carriages - Anton Chekhov"
- "Miracle"
- "My Wife"
- "Wine"
- "After the Fire - Anton Chekhov"
- "From a Journal of Southern Rivers - Charles Wright"
- "The Kitchen"
- "Songs in the Distance - Anton Chekhov"
- "Suspenders"
- "What You Need to Know for Fishing - Stephen Oliver"
- "Oyntment to Alure Fish to the Bait - James Chetham"
- "The Surgeon"
- "Night Dampness - Anton Chekhov"
- "Another Mystery"
- "Return to Kraków in 1880 - Czeslaw Milosz"
- "Sunday Night"
- "The Painter & the Fish"
- "At Noon - Anton Chekhov"
- "Artaudv
- "Caution"
- "One More"
- "At the Bird Market - Anton Chekhov"
- "His Bathrobe Pockets Stuffed with Notes"
- "The March into Russia"
- "Some Prose on Poetry"
- "Poems"
- "Letter"
- "The Young Girls"
- "From Epilogue - Robert Lowell"
- "The Offending Eel"
- "Sorrel - Anton Chekhov"
- "The Attic"
- "Margo"
- "On an Old Photograph of My Son"
- "Five O’clock in the Morning - Anton Chekhov"
- "Summer Fog"
- "Hummingbird"
- "Out"
- "Downstream - Anton Chekhov"
- "The Net"
- "Nearly"
- "Foreboding - Anton Chekhov"
- "Quiet Nights"
- "Sparrow Nights - Anton Chekhov"
- "Lemonade"
- "Such Diamonds - Anton Chekhov"
- "Wake Up"
- "What the Doctor Said"
- "Let’s Roar, Your Honor - Anton Chekhov"
- "Proposal"
- "Cherish"
- "Gravy"
- "No Need"
- "Through the Boughs"
- "After-Glow"
- "Late Fragment"
- "The Brass Ring"
- "Beginnings"
- "In the Trenches with Robert Graves"
- "The Man Outside"
- "Adultery"
- "For the Egyptian Coin Today, Arden, Thank You"
- "Seeds"
- "Betrayal"
- "The Contact"
- "Something is Happening"
- "A Summer in Sacramento"
- "Reaching"
- "Soda Crackers"
- "Those Days"
- "On the Pampas Tonight"
- "Poem on My Birthday, July 2"
- "Return"
- "The Sunbather, to Herself"
- "No Heroics, Please"

== Non-fiction ==
=== Essays ===
Title	Originally published in	Collected in:	Notes
"My Father's Life"	Esquire, September 1984	Fires (1983); Collected Stories (2009)	
"On Writing"	The New York Times Book Review, 15 February 1981 (as "A Storyteller's Shoptalk")	Fires (1983); Collected Stories (2009)	
"Fires"	Antaeus, Autumn 1982	Fires (1983); Collected Stories (2009)	Appears in anthology In Praise of What Persists (1983)
"On Where I'm Calling From"	Where I'm Calling From (1988) (as "A Special Message for the First Edition")	No Heroics, Please (1991); Call If You Need Me (2001); Collected Stories (2009)	
"John Gardner: The Writer as Teacher"	Georgia Review, Summer 1983 (as "John Gardner: Writer and Teacher")	Call If You Need Me (2001)	Reprinted as foreword to Gardner's; On Becoming a Novelist (1983)
"Friendship"	Granta, Autumn 1988	Call If You Need Me (2001)	
"Meditation on a Line from Saint Teresa"	Commencement, 15 May 1988 untitled statement	Call If You Need Me (2001)	

=== Occasions ===
Title	Published in:	Collected in:
On "Neighbors"	Cutting Edges: Young American Fiction for the '70s, ed. Jack Hicks (New York: Holt, Rinehart and Winston, 1973)	Call If You Need Me
On "Drinking While Driving"	New Voices in American Poetry, ed. David Allan Evans (Cambridge, Massachusetts: Winthrop Publishers, 1973)	Call If You Need Me
On Rewriting	Afterward to Fires: Essays, Poems, Stories, (Santa Barbara, California: Capra Press, 1983)	Call If You Need Me
On the Dosotevsky Screenplay	Introduction to Dostoevsky: A Screenplay (Santa Barbara, California: Capra Press, 1985)	Call If You Need Me
On "Bobber" and Other Poems	The Generation of 2000: Contemporary American Poets ed. William Heyen (Princeton, New Jersey: Ontario Review Press, 1984)	Call If You Need Me
On "For Tess"	Literary Cavalcade 39, no. 7 (Scholastic, Inc. New York, April 1987)	Call If You Need Me
On "Errand"	The Best American Short Stories 1988 (Boston: Houghton Mifflin, 1988)	Call If You Need Me
On Where I'm Calling From	Foreword to Where I'm Calling From (New York: Atlantic Monthly, 1988);	Call If You Need Me

=== Introductions ===
Title	Introduction to:	Collected in:
Steering by the Stars	Syracuse Poems and Stories 1980; Syracuse University, 1980	Call If You Need Me
All My Relations		Call If You Need Me
The Unknown Chekhov		Call If You Need Me
Fiction of Occurrence and Consequence (with Tom Jenks)		Call If You Need Me
On Contemporary Fiction		Call If You Need Me
On Longer Stories		Call If You Need Me

=== Book reviews ===
Title	Books reviewed	Published in:	Collected in:
Big Fish, Mythical Fish	My Moby Dick by William Humphrey	Chicago Tribune Book World, 29 October 1978	Call If You Need Me
Barthelme's Inhuman Comedies	Great Days by Donald Barthelme	Chicago Tribune Book World, 28 January 1978	Call If You Need Me
Rousing Tales			Call If You Need Me
Bluebeard Mornings, Storm Warnings			Call If You Need Me
A Gifted Novelist at the Top of His Game			Call If You Need Me
Fiction That Throws Light on Blackness			Call If You Need Me
Brautigan Serves Werewolf Berries and Cat Cantaloupe			Call If You Need Me
McGuane Goes After Big Game			Call If You Need Me
Richard Ford's Stark Vision of Loss, Healing			Call If You Need Me
A Retired Acrobat Falls under the Spell of a Teenage Girl			Call If You Need Me
"Fame Is No Good, Take It from Me"			Call If You Need Me
Coming of Age, Going to Pieces			Call If You Need Me

== Other works ==
At College

Carver's first publication was in the Chico State student newspaper, The Wildcat, on October 31, 1958. His contribution was a letter to the editor entitled "Where Is Intellect?", which complained about the apathy of students on campus. In 1962, Carver wrote an absurdist one-act play entitled Carnations, which was staged on his college's campus on May 11 and received mostly negative feedback. The play was published in 1992 by Engdahl Typography.

A fragment of Carver's unfinished novel The Augustine Notebooks was published in Iowa Review (Summer 1979), and later collected in Call If You Need Me (2000) and Collected Stories (2009). Additionally, Carver had accepted an advance on an unwritten novel from McGraw-Hill and planned to write a novel he imagined as "an African Queen sort of thing" set in German East Africa after World War I. Carver later admitted he stopped working on the novel after two weeks, and it appears that nothing of it exists beyond the published fragment.

Michael Cimino Screenplays

In 1982, Carver was approached by director Michael Cimino with the idea of reworking a screenplay on the life of Fyodor Dostoevsky. Carver asked Tess Gallagher to assist him in the project. The movie was never produced but the screenplay, entitled Dostoevsky, was published by Capra (Santa Barbara, 1985).

Carver and Cimino later collaborated on a screenplay which the two completed in fall of 1983. Tentatively called Purple Lake, the film was to be a contemporary Western "about the rehabilitation of juvenile felons," as described by The New York Times. This screenplay is now considered lost.

At an unspecified date, Cimino also claimed to have co-written another screenplay with Carver on the life of the American poet Thomas McGrath.

== Editing ==
Carver served as the founding editor of the Chico State literary magazine Selection in 1960 and the UC Santa Cruz journal Quarry (later Quarry West) in 1971. He also edited the Spring 1963 issue of Toyon at Humboldt State. Carver also selected the contents for the book Syracuse Poems and Stories 1980 (Syracuse, N.Y.: Department of English, Syracuse University, 1980). He also selected, along with Shannon Ravenel, the stories included in The Best American Short Stories 1986 (Boston: Houghton Mifflin, 1986) and edited American Short Story Masterpieces (New York: Delacorte Press, 1987) with Tom Jenks.
