= Where I'm Calling From: New and Selected Stories =

1988 short story collection by Raymond Carver

- First edition hardcover
- Author: Raymond Carver
- Cover artist: Lorraine Louie (design); Trent Burleson (illustration)
- Language: English
- Genre: Short story collection
- Publisher: Atlantic Monthly Press
- Publication date: May 1988
- Media type: Print (hardcover)
- Pages: 393 pp.
- ISBN: 978-0-87113-216-1
- OCLC: 17321685
- Dewey Decimal: 813/.54
- LC Class: PS3553.A7894 W43 1988

Where I'm Calling From: New and Selected Stories is a 1988 collection of short stories compiled by American author Raymond Carver. The collection includes 30 stories selected from four previously published volumes, and seven new stories. They appear in the order of their original publication. The book was published by the Atlantic Monthly Press in May 1988, three months before Carver's death. The seven new stories were later published as a separate book in the United Kingdom, titled Elephant and Other Stories, in August 1988. A paperback edition was published by Vintage Contemporaries in June 1989, under the title Where I'm Calling From: Selected Stories. The book received positive reviews from critics and was a finalist for the Pulitzer Prize for Fiction.

== Background ==
After writing "Errand", the last story in the book, Carver was diagnosed with lung cancer. He underwent surgery in October 1987 in Syracuse, New York, where doctors removed two-thirds of his left lung. When the cancer returned in his brain in March 1988, Carver underwent a seven-week course of radiation therapy from April to May.

The book does not collect all of Carver's stories. In an interview with The New York Times, Carver said, "There are some I'm not particularly fond of and would not like to see reprinted again. I just picked up ones that I felt I could live with." Where I'm Calling From was edited by Gary Fisketjon, an employee of the Atlantic Monthly Press at the time. In Carol Sklenicka's biography of Carver, Fisketjon is quoted as saying, "The main reason Ray and I wanted to do a 'new and selected' with Where I'm Calling From was to show how steadily his work had evolved and to shuck the moronic 'minimalist' label." Fisketjon declared, "Where I'm Calling From is the definitive edition of Ray's stories. Those are the stories that Ray wanted to restore."

There was some contention between Raymond Carver and his editor Gordon Lish over several of Carver's stories; the author once complained about the "surgical amputation and transplant that might make them someway fit into the carton so the lid will close." Several of his stories in What We Talk About When We Talk About Love were published with extensive alterations by Lish. In Where I'm Calling From, Carver included some stories as edited by Lish, some restored from his original manuscripts, and some unpublished stories. In the 2000s, Carver's widow, Tess Gallagher, fought with Knopf for permission to republish the 17 stories in What We Talk About When We Talk About Love as they were originally written by Carver. These original versions eventually appeared in Beginners, published by Jonathan Cape in 2009, and in the Library of America volume Collected Stories.

== Contents ==
=== Selected stories ===
- "Nobody Said Anything"
- "Bicycles, Muscles, Cigarettes"
- "The Student's Wife"
- "They're Not Your Husband"
- "What Do You Do in San Francisco?"
- "Fat"
- "What's in Alaska?"
- "Neighbors"
- "Put Yourself in My Shoes"
- "Collectors"
- "Why, Honey?"
- "Are These Actual Miles?"
- "Gazebo"
- "One More Thing"
- "Little Things"
- "Why Don't You Dance?"
- "A Serious Talk"
- "What We Talk About When We Talk About Love"
- "Distance"
- "The Third Thing That Killed My Father Off"
- "So Much Water So Close to Home"
- "The Calm"
- "Vitamins"
- "Careful"
- "Where I'm Calling From"
- "Chef's House"
- "Fever"
- "Feathers"
- "Cathedral"
- "A Small, Good Thing"

=== New stories ===
- "Boxes"
- "Whoever Was Using This Bed"
- "Intimacy"
- "Menudo"
- "Elephant"
- "Blackbird Pie"
- "Errand"

== Reception ==
Publishers Weekly wrote, "Carver has the ability to render graceful prose from dreary, commonplace, scraping-the-bottom human misery." The publication also praised the new story "The Errand" as having "more affecting and finished prose than ever before".

In a lengthy review for The New York Times, author Marilynne Robinson wrote that the last seven stories are "written in more elegant prose and more elegiac" than the previous stories in the collection. Robinson continued: "Carver stands squarely in the line of descent of American realism. His weaknesses are for sentimentality and sensationalism. His great gift is for writing stories that create meaning through their form. [...] He should be famous for the conceptual beauty of his best stories, and disburdened of his worst." Robinson, however, went on to lament the difficult and "uncongenial" experience of reading Carver.

Paul Skenazy of the Los Angeles Times wrote, "The book that results is austere, impressive and weighty with the authority of a writer whose attention to language, and the people who live within and by it, rarely wavers."

On November 27, 1989, the English-Speaking Union awarded the book its Ambassador Book Award. The book was also a finalist for the 1988 National Book Critics Circle Award for Fiction, and the 1989 Pulitzer Prize for Fiction.
