= Short Cuts =

1993 film by Robert Altman

- Theatrical release poster
- Directed by: Robert Altman
- Screenplay by: Robert Altman; Frank Barhydt
- Based on: Characters by Raymond Carver
- Produced by: Cary Brokaw
- Starring: Andie MacDowell; Bruce Davison; Julianne Moore; Matthew Modine; Anne Archer; Fred Ward; Jennifer Jason Leigh; Chris Penn; Lili Taylor; Robert Downey Jr.; Madeleine Stowe; Tim Robbins; Lily Tomlin; Tom Waits; Frances McDormand; Peter Gallagher; Annie Ross; Lori Singer; Jack Lemmon; Lyle Lovett; Buck Henry; Huey Lewis
- Cinematography: Walt Lloyd
- Edited by: Geraldine Peroni
- Music by: Mark Isham
- Production companies: Spelling Films International; Cary Brokaw Productions; Avenue Pictures
- Distributed by: Fine Line Features
- Release date: October 3, 1993
- Running time: 188 minutes
- Country: United States
- Language: English
- Budget: $12 million
- Box office: $6.1 million

Short Cuts is a 1993 American comedy-drama film directed by Robert Altman. Filmed from a screenplay by Altman and Frank Barhydt, it is inspired by nine short stories and a poem by Raymond Carver. The film is set in Los Angeles, in contrast to the original Pacific Northwest backdrop of Carver's stories. Short Cuts traces the actions of 22 principal characters, both in parallel and at occasional loose points of connection.

The film features an ensemble cast including Matthew Modine, Julianne Moore, Fred Ward, Anne Archer, Jennifer Jason Leigh, Robert Downey Jr., Madeleine Stowe, Chris Penn, Jack Lemmon, Frances McDormand, Lori Singer, Andie MacDowell, Buck Henry, Lily Tomlin, actress and singer Annie Ross, and musicians Huey Lewis, Lyle Lovett, and Tom Waits.

The film won the Golden Lion at the 50th Venice International Film Festival in a tie with Three Colours: Blue by Krzysztof Kieślowski.

== Plot ==
The film begins with a fleet of helicopters spraying for medflies, which brings various characters together along the flight path.

Dr. Ralph Wyman and his wife Marian meet unemployed salesman Stuart Kane and his party clown wife Claire at a concert where Zoe Trainer performs on cello. They impulsively decide to have a Sunday dinner date. Marian's sister Sherri is married to a cheating cop named Gene Shepard, who is having an affair with Betty Weathers. Betty is divorcing one of the helicopter pilots, Stormy.

Among the other characters are Doreen Piggot, a waitress married to an alcoholic limo driver named Earl, and television commentator Howard Finnigan and his wife, Anne, who live next door to Zoe and her mother, Tess, a jazz singer. Jerry Kaiser, the pool cleaner, is married to Lois, who works from home as a phone sex operator. Jerry and Lois are friends with Honey, Doreen's daughter, and her husband Bill Bush, a makeup artist.

Tragedy strikes when Casey, Howard and Anne's young son, is accidentally hit by Doreen's car. Although he initially seems fine, Casey later falls unconscious at home. The concerned parents rush him to the hospital, where he remains comatose. In the midst of this, the baker Andy Bitkower repeatedly calls the Finnigans to inform them about their ordered cake. However, Howard, wanting to keep the phone line free, abruptly ends the calls, leading to frustration on Andy's part.

Howard's estranged father, Paul, arrives at the hospital and recalls an incident from Howard's childhood, which caused the rift between them. Meanwhile, Stuart and his friends, Gordon and Vern, harass Doreen at the diner before leaving for a fishing trip. During their excursion, they discover the body of a young woman. Contemplating what to do, they decide to tie her to the rocks and continue fishing, only reporting the incident later. Stuart eventually confesses to Claire, who is appalled by their actions and visits the funeral home out of guilt.

Stormy pays a destructive visit to Betty's house while she is away with their son. Gene abandons the family dog due to its barking, but eventually retrieves it after his children express distress. The Wymans have a heated argument before their dinner party with the Kanes, during which Marian admits to having an affair. Both couples resort to heavy drinking, and the party lasts throughout the night.

A glimmer of hope arises when Casey's eyes flutter, but tragically, he suddenly dies, leaving Howard and Anne devastated. Meanwhile, Zoe, overwhelmed by her mother's alcoholism, Casey's death, and her own isolation, commits suicide by starting her car engine inside the garage. Her mother discovers her lifeless body and drinks herself into a stupor.

When Honey picks up pictures from the Fotomat, she finds them mixed up with Gordon's. Honey is shocked to find pictures of the submerged body from Gordon's fishing trip while Gordon is equally shocked to find pictures of Honey appearing severely beaten. Disturbed, they part ways but memorize each other's license plates. Later, at a picnic, Jerry and Bill encounter two young women on bicycles. At Bill's suggestion, they follow the girls to see if they are waiting for them. They start talking to the girls offering them beer. Bill and one of the girls walk away, only to hear her scream moments before Jerry kills her with a rock. Suddenly, a major earthquake strikes, causing chaos. The aftermath suggests that Jerry's act may be mistakenly attributed to the falling rocks during the earthquake.

== Cast ==
- Andie MacDowell as Anne Finnigan
- Bruce Davison as Howard Finnigan
- Julianne Moore as Marian Wyman
- Matthew Modine as Dr. Ralph Wyman
- Anne Archer as Claire Kane
- Fred Ward as Stuart Kane
- Jennifer Jason Leigh as Lois Kaiser
- Chris Penn as Jerry Kaiser
- Lili Taylor as Honey Piggot Bush
- Robert Downey Jr. as Bill Bush
- Madeleine Stowe as Sherri Shepard
- Tim Robbins as Gene Shepard
- Lily Tomlin as Doreen Piggot
- Tom Waits as Earl Piggot
- Frances McDormand as Betty Weathers
- Peter Gallagher as Stormy Weathers
- Annie Ross as Tess Trainer
- Lori Singer as Zoe Trainer, the cellist
- Jack Lemmon as Paul Finnigan
- Lyle Lovett as Andy Bitkower
- Buck Henry as Gordon Johnson
- Huey Lewis as Vern Miller
- Charles Rocket as Wally Littleton
- Michael Beach as Jim Stone

== Production ==
According to associate producer Mike Kaplan, the screenplay was first written in 1989. Filming primarily took place in Los Angeles, California. Principal photography began on July 26, 1992, and ended on October 1, 1992.

== Release ==
The film was distributed by Fine Line Features and released in the United States on October 3, 1993. A special DVD edition was released by the Criterion Collection in 2004 and contains two discs, the collection of Carver's short stories, and an essay booklet on the film.

== Reception ==
Short Cuts received critical acclaim. On Rotten Tomatoes, the film holds a 95% approval rating, based on 60 reviews, with an average rating of 7.8/10. The site's critical consensus reads, "Robert Altman's ensemble drama deftly integrates its disparate characters and episodes into a funny, poignant, emotionally satisfying whole." On Metacritic, the film holds a score of 81 out of 100, based on 22 critics, indicating "universal acclaim".

Roger Ebert gave the film four out of four stars and wrote: "Los Angeles always seems to be waiting for something. Permanence seems out of reach; some great apocalyptic event is on the horizon, and people view the future tentatively. Robert Altman's 'Short Cuts' captures that uneasiness perfectly in its interlocking stories about people who seem trapped in the present, always juggling." Vincent Canby of The New York Times wrote, "The lives are often desperate and the characters inarticulate, but the group portrait is as grandly, sometimes as hilariously, realized as anything the director has ever done." Gene Siskel of the Chicago Tribune gave the film four out of four stars and called it "a brilliant companion piece" to The Player. Kenneth Turan of the Los Angeles Times wrote that the film "is not equally involving all the time. Some performances are stronger than others, some situations more entertaining, and some choices Altman has made, like an overreliance on female nudity that borders on the exploitative, difficult to defend. But whenever interest lags, a look, a moment, a frisson of regret will cross the screen and the emotional connection is restored." Rita Kempley of The Washington Post panned the film as "a cynical, sexist and shallow work" populated with "whiny, inert and mostly unlikable characters."

=== Accolades ===
Short Cuts was named one of the best films of 1993 by over 50 film critics. Only The Piano and Schindler's List appeared on more lists.

Altman was nominated for the Academy Award for Best Director (but lost to Steven Spielberg for Schindler's List) and shared a nomination for the Golden Globe Award for Best Screenplay with Barhydt (lost to Steven Zaillian for Schindler's List). The cast won a Special Golden Globe Award for their ensemble acting. The film also won the prestigious Golden Lion and the Volpi Cup for Best Ensemble Cast at the Venice Film Festival.

Year	Award	Category	Nominated work	Result	Ref.
1993	Academy Awards	Best Director	Robert Altman	Nominated	
1993	Golden Globe Awards	Best Screenplay	Robert Altman; Frank Barhydt	Nominated	
1993	Golden Globe Awards	Special Award for Ensemble	Short Cuts	Won	
1993	Venice Film Festival	Golden Lion	Robert Altman	Won	
1993	Venice Film Festival	FIPRESCI Prize	Robert Altman	Won	
1993	Venice Film Festival	Pasinetti Award	Robert Altman	Won	
1993	Venice Film Festival	Special Volpi Cup	Andie MacDowell; Bruce Davison; Jack Lemmon; Zane Cassidy; Julianne Moore; Matthew Modine; Anne Archer; Fred Ward; Jennifer Jason Leigh; Chris Penn; Joseph C. Hopkins; Josette Maccario; Lili Taylor; Robert Downey Jr. Madeleine Stowe; Tim Robbins; Cassie Friel; Dustin Friel; Austin Friel; Lily Tomlin; Tom Waits; Frances McDormand; Peter Gallagher; Jarrett Lennon; Annie Ross; Lori Singer; Lyle Lovett; Buck Henry; Huey Lewis; Danny Darst	Won	
1995	César Award	Best Foreign Film	Short Cuts	Nominated	
1993	Independent Spirit Awards	Best Feature	Short Cuts	Won	
1993	Independent Spirit Awards	Best Director	Robert Altman	Won	
1993	Independent Spirit Awards	Best Screenplay	Robert Altman; Frank Barhydt	Won	
1993	Independent Spirit Awards	Best Supporting Female	Julianne Moore	Nominated	
1993	National Board of Review	Top Ten Films of 1993	Short Cuts	Won	
1993	National Society of Film Critics	Best Film	Short Cuts	Nominated	
1993	National Society of Film Critics	Best Director	Robert Altman	Nominated	
1993	National Society of Film Critics	Best Screenplay	Robert Altman; Frank Barhydt	Nominated	
1993	National Society of Film Critics	Best Supporting Actress	Madeline Stowe	Won	
1993	National Society of Film Critics	Best Supporting Actress	Jennifer Jason Leigh	Nominated	
1993	New York Film Critics Circle	Best Supporting Actress	Jennifer Jason Leigh	Nominated	
1993	Los Angeles Film Critics Association	Best Director	Robert Altman	Nominated	
1993	Los Angeles Film Critics Association	Best Screenplay	Robert Altman; Frank Barhydt	Nominated	
1993	Chicago Film Critics Association	Best Film	Short Cuts	Nominated	
1993	Chicago Film Critics Association	Best Director	Robert Altman	Nominated	
1993	Chicago Film Critics Association	Best Screenplay	Robert Altman; Frank Barhydt	Nominated	
1993	Chicago Film Critics Association	Best Supporting Actress	Andie MacDowell	Nominated	
1993	Boston Society of Film Critics	Best Screenplay	Robert Altman; Frank Barhydt	Won	

=== Year-end lists ===
- Top 10 (listed alphabetically, not ranked) – Mike Mayo, The Roanoke Times
- No. 1. Peter Travers, Rolling Stone
- No. 1. Armond White, The City Sun
- No. 2. Gene Siskel, Chicago Tribune

== Book ==
A book was released to accompany the film, which compiled the nine short stories and one poem that inspired it. Altman wrote an introduction to this collection, which featured insights into the making of the film and his own thoughts about Carver's stories.

1. "Neighbors"
2. "They're Not Your Husband"
3. "Vitamins"
4. "Will You Please Be Quiet, Please?"
5. "So Much Water So Close to Home"
6. "A Small, Good Thing"
7. "Jerry and Molly and Sam"
8. "Collectors"
9. "Tell the Women We're Going"
10. "Lemonade" (poem)

== In popular culture ==
The song Will You Please Pass The Milk, Please? by Car Seat Headrest heavily references the film and how it ruined Will Toledo's relationship with his father effectively. The title of this song also references Will You Please Be Quiet, Please? by Raymond Carver which inspired this film.

The structure of Richard Curtis's film Love, Actually was inspired by Short Cuts and Altman's earlier film, Nashville.

== Documentary ==
Luck, Trust & Ketchup: Robert Altman in Carver County was a behind-the-scenes documentary, featuring interviews with Altman and the cast.

== Unfilmed sequel ==
Anne Rapp, who wrote Cookie's Fortune and Dr. T & The Women for Altman, was commissioned to adapt more Carver stories into a screenplay which he did not film.
