= Ville Neuve =

- Directed by: Félix Dufour-Laperrière
- Written by: Félix Dufour-Laperrière
- Based on: Chef's House by Raymond Carver
- Produced by: Galilé Marion-Gauvin
- Starring: Robert Lalonde; Johanne-Marie Tremblay; Théodore Pellerin; Gildor Roy; Paul Ahmarani
- Cinematography: Félix Dufour-Laperrière
- Edited by: Félix Dufour-Laperrière
- Music by: Jean L'Appeau
- Production company: L'Unité Centrale
- Distributed by: Funfilm Distribution
- Release dates: September 7, 2018 (Venice); April 12, 2019 (Quebec)
- Running time: 76 minutes
- Country: Canada
- Language: French
- Budget: C$1.6 million

Ville Neuve is a 2018 Canadian animated drama film written and directed by Félix Dufour-Laperrière, in his animated feature debut. Made entirely by hand using ink on paper, the film stars Robert Lalonde and Johanne-Marie Tremblay in a story set against the backdrop of the 1995 Quebec referendum campaign. It premiered in the Venice Days section of the 2018 Venice International Film Festival.

== Synopsis ==
Joseph returns to the Gaspé Peninsula, where he stays in a seaside cabin that he had once visited with his former wife, Emma. Hoping to reconnect with her, he calls Emma, who eventually travels to Gaspé. The story is set against the backdrop of the 1995 Quebec referendum campaign.

== Cast ==
The cast includes:

- Robert Lalonde as Joseph
- Johanne-Marie Tremblay as Emma
- Théodore Pellerin as Ulysse
- Gildor Roy as Édouard
- Paul Ahmarani as the innkeeper
- Francesco Najari as young Ulysse
- Marie-Ève Blain-Juste as Marie
- Florence Blain-Mbaye as the driver
- Rémi Savard as Brandon

== Production ==
Dufour-Laperrière began writing the screenplay in 2012, adapting it in part from Raymond Carver's short story "Chef's House". The film was his animated feature debut. It was animated entirely by hand using ink on paper animation. It was made by a team of around 30 people, using approximately 80,000 drawings, on a budget of C$1.6 million.

== Release ==
The film premiered in the Venice Days section of the 2018 Venice International Film Festival. It was selected for the feature competition at the 2018 Ottawa International Animation Festival. The film had its Quebec premiere at the Festival du nouveau cinéma, and was later screened at the Hamburg Film Festival and the Vancouver International Film Festival. It was released theatrically on four screens in Montreal and Quebec City on April 12, 2019.

== Reception ==
=== Critical response ===
Writing for The Hollywood Reporter, Boyd van Hoeij called Dufour-Laperrière "a gifted animator with a minimalist but personal style", but wrote that the film’s adaptation felt "sketchy and unpolished" and that its political material was not fully integrated into the story.

=== Awards and nominations ===
Félix Dufour-Laperrière was long-listed for the 2018 Directors Guild of Canada Discovery Award for Ville Neuve.
