= Robert Lalonde =

Canadian actor and writer

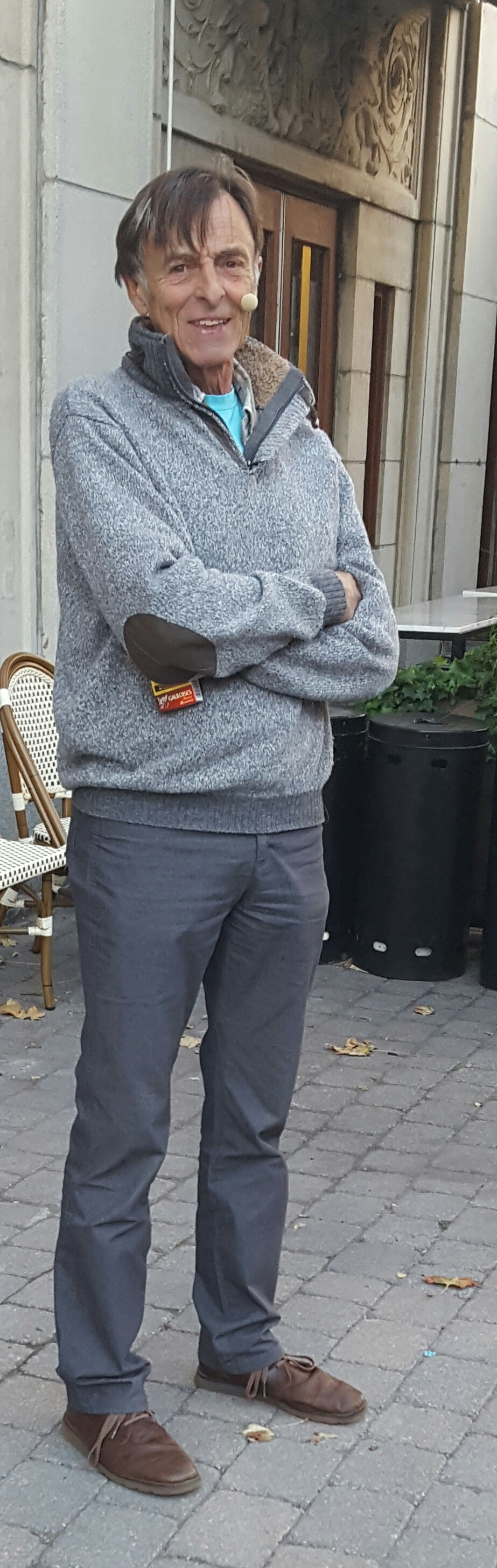
Lalonde in 2016

Robert Lalonde O.C. (born 22 July 1947 in Oka, Quebec) is a Canadian actor and writer. He won the Governor General's Award for French-language fiction at the 1994 Governor General's Awards for Le Petit aigle à tête blanche. He was also nominated in 1989 for Le Diable en personne, in 1993 for Sept lacs plus au nord, in 2007 for Espèces en voie de disparition and in 2014 for C'est le cœur qui meurt en dernier.

Lalonde film and television roles as an actor have included The Saracen Woman (La Sarrasine), Lilies, Looking for Alexander (Mémoires affectives), Shake Hands with the Devil, Bittersweet Memories (Ma vie en cinémascope), Séraphin: Heart of Stone (Séraphin: Un homme et son péché), Les Rescapés and Ville Neuve.

== Awards and recognitions ==
- Prix Robert-Cliche, 1981 (La Belle Épouvante)
- Prix Jean-Macé, 1982 (Le Dernier Été des indiens)
- Prix Québec-Paris, 1985 (Une belle journée d'avance)
- Grand Prix du livre de Montréal, 1988 (Le Fou du père)
- Prix des lectrices Elle Québec, 1992 (L'Ogre de Grand Remous)
- Governor General's Award, 1994 (Le Petit Aigle à tête blanche)
- Prix France-Québec/Jean Hamelin 1995 (Le Petit Aigle à tête blanche)
- Lalonde was appointed an Officer of the Order of Canada in 2009.
- Prix Athanase-David, 2023

== Works ==
=== Novels ===
- La belle épouvante, 1981; translated into English by David Homel as Sweet Madness, 1982.
- Le dernier été des Indiens, 1982; translated into English by Jean-Paul Murray as The Last Indian Summer, 2013.
- Une belle journée d'avance, 1986; translated into English by Neil Bishop as One Beautiful Day to Come, 1998.
- Le fou du père, 1988;
- Le diable en personne, 1989; translated into English by Leonard W. Sugden as The Devil Incarnate, 1997.
- L'ogre de Grand Remous, 1992; translated into English by Leonard W. Sugden as The Ogre of Grand Remous, 1995.
- Sept lacs plus au nord, 1993; translated into English by Jean-Paul Murray as Seven Lakes Further North, 2012.
- Le Petit aigle à tête blanche, 1994; translated into English by Jean-Paul Murray as Little Eagle With a White Head, 2015.
- Où vont les sizerins flammés en été?, 1996.
- Des nouvelles d'amis très chers, 1999.
- Un jardin entouré de murailles, 2002.
- Que vais-je devenir jusqu'à ce que je meure?, 2005; translated into English by Jean-Paul Murray as What Will I Become Until I Die? 2014.
- Un jour le vieux hangar sera emporté par la débâcle, 2012.
- C'est le cœur qui meurt en dernier, 2013; translated into English by Jean-Paul Murray as The Heart is What Dies Last, 2016.
- Le Petit Voleur, 2016; translated into English by Jean-Paul Murray as The Little Thief, 2019.
- Un poignard dans un mouchoir de soie, 2018.
- La reconstruction du paradis, 2021; translated into English by Jean-Paul Murray as Rebuilding Paradise, 2021.

=== Short stories ===
- Espèces en voie de disparition, 2007
- Un cœur rouge dans la glace, 2009

=== Poetry ===
- Baie de feu, Écrits des Forges, 1991

=== Plays ===
- Monsieur Bovary - ou Mourir au théâtre, 2001

=== Non-fiction ===
- Le monde sur le flanc de la truite, 1997; translated into English by Jean-Paul Murray as The World on the Side of a Trout, 2017.
- Le vacarmeur, 1999; translated into English by Jean-Paul Murray as The Game Driver, to be published.
- Iotékha, 2004; translated into English by Jean-Paul Murray as Iotékha, 2020.
- Le Seul instant, 2011.
- La Liberté des savanes, 2017.
- Fais ta guerre, fais ta joie, 2019.

== Filmography ==
Year	Title	Role	Notes
1992	The Saracen Woman (La Sarrasine)	Me St-Louis	
1996	Lilies	The Baron	
2002	Séraphin: Heart of Stone (Séraphin: un homme et son péché)	Docteur Cyprien	
2004	The Five of Us (Elles étaient cinq)	Paul	
2004	Looking for Alexander (Mémoires affectives)	Agent Drolet	
2004	Bittersweet Memories (Ma vie en cinémascope)	Neurologue Prévost	
2006	Without Her (Sans elle)	Robert	
2007	Shake Hands with the Devil	Général Maurice Baril	
2013	Emilie	Gabriel	
2017	It's the Heart That Dies Last (C'est le coeur qui meurt en dernier)	Barman hôtel	
2018	Ville Neuve	Joseph	
2021	Portrait-Robot	Michel Lambeau/Robert Hargrave	TV series, 2 episodes
