= Popular Mechanics (short story) =

- Short story by Raymond Carver
- Country: United States
- Language: English

Publication
- Published in: Furious Seasons and Other Stories
- Media type: Print
- Publication date: 1977

"Popular Mechanics" is a short story by American writer Raymond Carver. It was originally titled "Mine" and first appeared in Carver's 1977 collection Furious Seasons and Other Stories. It was then republished as "Little Things" in Fiction, as "Mine" again in Playgirl, as "Popular Mechanics" in Carver's 1981 collection What We Talk About When We Talk About Love, and again as "Little Things" in Carver's 1988 collection Where I'm Calling From: New and Selected Stories. There are minor revisions between the version of "Mine" in Furious Seasons and the version published as "Popular Mechanics".

== Plot ==
"Popular Mechanics" is the story of a couple that has been having relationship issues. Raymond Carver uses ambiguity in the story to describe the situation that is going on between the married couple. Although the problems they are having are not stated specifically, it is clear that the couple is moving apart from each other. The narrator shows us the husband getting ready to leave his wife, which turns into a yelling match. The man is packing a suitcase, getting ready to leave, when he demands to take their child with him. However, the couple then argues about the child as well. The wife holds the child, and they begin to argue about who should take care of the baby. The wife does not want him to have the baby, but the husband thinks he should have it. The couple begins grasping the baby by the arms. The wife has one arm and the husband has hold of the other. Then, the baby begins crying because it is apparently in some pain, due to the actions of the couple. The husband begins forcing his wife's hands off of the baby, her grip slips off, but she grabs the baby again harder. The wife does the same thing, and the husband grabs the child by the top of his arm underneath the shoulder. The baby was slipping from both people, but they held on harder and pulled in the opposite directions. As the couple pulled on the child from its arms, it is apparent that they harmed the baby in some way, hence the last line of the story:

He felt the baby slipping out of his hands and he pulled back very hard. In this manner, the issue was decided.

== Analysis ==
The ending of the story is an homage to the biblical story of Solomon's Judgement, where King Solomon solves a dispute between two mothers over the ownership of a baby by suggesting it be split down the middle, and one half be given to each woman. One of the mothers protests this decision, and so King Solomon declares that she must be the true mother, as any mother would rather see their child given to someone else than harmed. The baby in this short story however is not as fortunate.

== See also ==
- Popular Mechanics
- Judgement of Solomon

== Sources ==
- Oates, Joyce Carrol. American Gothic Tales. 1996. Print.
