= Where I'm Calling From =

- Short story by Raymond Carver
- Country: United States
- Language: English

Publication
- Published in: The New Yorker
- Publication date: March 15, 1982

"Where I'm Calling From" is a short story by American author Raymond Carver. The story focuses on the effects of alcohol. Throughout this story Carver experiments with the use of quotation and meditates on the healing factors of storytelling. "Where I'm Calling From" was originally published in the March 15, 1982 issue of The New Yorker. It was later collected in Cathedral (1983). The story also lends its title to a collection of thirty-seven short stories compiled by Carver, Where I'm Calling From: New and Selected Stories (1988).

== Plot synopsis ==
The main character, an unnamed man, has been dropped off at Frank Martin's alcohol rehabilitation center by his girlfriend, not to be confused with his wife. After arriving he encounters Joe Penny ("J.P") who starts telling him his story. J.P. is a chimney sweep drunk whose father-in-law and brother-in-law recently dropped him off at Frank Martin's as well. J.P. tells the story of how he met his wife, Roxy, one afternoon at a friend's house. She was a chimney sweep who asked to kiss J.P.'s friend when she was done cleaning his chimney. J.P. asked for a kiss as well. J.P dated Roxy, married her, and they have two children. As J.P. continues his story it becomes about how alcohol has ruined his marriage to his wife. Roxy comes to visit J.P. The story ends with the main character contemplating calling his wife or calling his girlfriend. The story title comes from the last few lines where he says:

I won't raise my voice. Not even if she starts something. She'll ask me where I'm calling from, and I'll have to tell her. I won't say anything about New Year's resolutions. There's no way to make a joke out of this. After I talk to her, I'll call my girlfriend. Maybe I'll call her first. I'll just have to hope I don't get her kid on the line. "Hello, sugar," I'll say when she answers. "It's me."
