= Neighbors (short story) =

1971 short story by Raymond Carver

- Short story by Raymond Carver
- Country: United States
- Language: English

Publication
- Published in: Esquire
- Publication date: June 1971

"Neighbors" is a short story written by Raymond Carver in 1971. It first appeared in Esquire magazine in June 1971. It was published in the collection Will You Please Be Quiet, Please? in 1976, in the compilation Where I'm Calling From in 1989, and again in Short Cuts in 1993.

== Plot ==
The short story "Neighbors" by Raymond Carver has a plot that follows the exploits of Bill and Arlene Miller who are left to take care of the Stone's apartment. The plot is chronological and despite a few memories of the characters, the action begins when the Stones leave for their trip and ends after the Millers have gone through their apartment. It is clear that there is a close friendship between the two couples and it is also apparent that Bill and Arlene find their lives less exciting than that of their neighbors. When the Stone's leave for their vacation, Bill goes over to the apartment to water the plants and feed the cat.

As time progresses in "Neighbors", Bill becomes increasingly interested in his neighbor's possessions, almost as though he is living through them simply by eating their food, drinking their drinks, and trying on their clothes. He even takes time off of work to spend time in their apartment, almost as if it has a magical quality that makes time fly by. Bill appears to be stimulated sexually by his visits the neighbor's apartment, as does Arlene. Like her husband, Arlene too spends a great deal of time at the Stone's apartment, rifling through their possessions. In the end, they accidentally leave the key to the Stone's apartment inside, hence locking themselves out. They both worry that the Stones will find out what they have been doing in their apartment.
