= Cathedral (short story) =

- Short story by Raymond Carver
- Country: United States
- Language: English

Publication
- Published in: The Atlantic Monthly
- Publication date: September 1981

"Cathedral" is a short story written by American writer and poet Raymond Carver. It was the first story written after finishing What We Talk About When We Talk About Love. "Cathedral" was first published in the September 1981 issue of The Atlantic Monthly. It was later collected in a short story collection of the same name in 1983.

== Plot ==
"Cathedral" opens with the narrator telling the reader in a conversational tone that a blind friend of his wife's is coming to visit them. The narrator is clearly unhappy about the upcoming visit. He then flashes back to the story of how his wife met the blind man when she worked for him as a reader. At the time, she was engaged to marry an officer in the Air Force. When she tells the blind man goodbye, he asks if he can touch her face. The touch of his fingers on her face is a pivotal moment in her life, something the narrator does not understand.

Although his wife has maintained contact with the blind man for ten years, this will be the first time she has seen him since her marriage, subsequent divorce, and remarriage. Robert, the blind man, has just lost his wife and will be travelling to Connecticut to visit with her family. Along the way, he will spend the night at the home of the narrator and his wife. His wife tells the narrator that Robert and his wife, Beulah, were inseparable. The narrator considers how dreadful it must have been for Beulah not to have been seen by the man she loved.

When Robert arrives, he visits with the narrator's wife; the narrator observes them, but only occasionally joins in on the conversation. They all drink heavily and eat a large dinner, complete with strawberry pie. After dinner, they drink more, and the narrator continues to observe. Finally deciding that the blind man is "beginning to run down," the narrator turns on the television set, much to his wife's dismay. She leaves the room to get on a robe, and Robert and the narrator share cannabis, again much to his wife's dismay.

The narrator's wife falls asleep and the narrator is left with Robert and the television. The narrator attempts to describe what he sees on the television; however, when a cathedral appears in a documentary, the narrator is unable to find the words to describe it.

Robert asks the narrator to get some paper and a pen so that they can draw a cathedral together. The narrator does as he is asked. When he returns, he gives the paper to Robert who feels the size of the paper. Then Robert places his hand on the hand of the narrator that holds the pen. "'Go ahead, bub, draw,' he said. 'Draw. You'll see. I'll follow along with you. It'll be okay. Just begin now like I'm telling you.'"

The drawing goes on and on. Finally, Robert tells the narrator to close his eyes and continue to draw. At this moment, something strange happens to the narrator. "It was like nothing else in my life up to now," he tells the reader. Even when Robert tells him to open his eyes, he keeps them closed. Something has happened to him that has changed his understanding of life. "My eyes were still closed. I was in my house. I knew that. But I didn't feel like I was inside anything." No longer hostile to Robert, no longer aware of Robert's blindness, the narrator experiences the possibility of change in his life.

== Recognition ==
The short story "Cathedral" was included in the 1982 edition of Best American Short Stories. It is the final story in Carver's collection Cathedral (1983). "Cathedral" is generally considered to be one of Carver's finest works, displaying both his expertise in crafting a minimalist story and also writing about a catharsis with such simple storylines. The author commented in an interview:

The story "Cathedral" seemed to me completely different from everything I'd written before. I was in a period of generosity. The character there is full of prejudices against blind people. He changes; he grows. The sighted man changes. He puts himself in the blind man's place. The story affirms something.

Bruce Allen of The Christian Science Monitor considered "Cathedral" to be "among the year's finest fiction," and he wrote, "The story is about learning how to imagine, and feel - and it's the best example so far of the way Raymond Carver's accomplished miniaturist art is stretching itself, exploring new territories." Samuel Coale of The Providence Journal praised the way an "unpoetic soul" is able to describe the cathedral to a blind man: "Even in such nihilistic landscapes, epiphanies are still possible, and Carver makes us feel them with a quiet, smouldering joy that only such accurate and unblurred landscapes in fiction can produce."
