= Chef's House =

- Short story by Raymond Carver
- Country: United States
- Language: English

Publication
- Published in: The New Yorker
- Publication date: November 30, 1981

"Chef's House" is a short story written by Raymond Carver.

== Plot ==
Wes, a middle-aged man, goes to live by the ocean as he tries to recover from his alcoholism. He rents a house from another recovered alcoholic, Chef, and calls his wife, Edna, who he has not been with in over two years, to come and live with him. She does and they have a happy summer together until Chef tells him they have to leave by the end of the month so that he can give the house to his daughter, Linda. Wes, who has attached the success of his recovery to the house, takes the news badly and must decide whether to continue his success or to succumb to drinking again.

== Background ==
"Chef's House" was originally published by The New Yorker magazine in their November 30, 1981 issue, and was the first of Carver's stories to be published in the magazine. Later, it was published in the short story collections Cathedral in 1983 and Where I'm Calling From: New and Selected Stories in 1988.

== Characters ==
- Wes – One of the primary characters and a recovering alcoholic; he struggles with establishing his own identity apart from alcohol and Chef's house throughout the story
- Edna – Wes' wife who leaves her current boyfriend and peaceful situation to give Wes another chance one summer
- Chef – A recovered alcoholic who rents out his house to Wes
- Linda – Also called "Fat Linda," Chef's daughter
- Cheryl and Bobby – Wes and Edna's children; mentioned in passing

== Themes ==
There are multiple themes in "Chef's House," all of which are closely interrelated.

Alcohol

Alcohol plays a major role in the short story, despite the fact that the word itself never appears. "Alcoholic," "drink," "drinking," "drunk," and "sober" all show up at some point, but never "alcohol." Wes is a recovering alcoholic, attending "Don't Drink meetings" with Chef. It is implied that his marriage with Edna originally failed because of his drinking, and his children have become estranged from him for the same reason. While Wes originally is very successful in stopping to drink, the end of the story sees him sinking back towards the decision to drink again because of shattered hopes and a fragile sense of identity.

Identity

Almost even more pervasive than alcohol in the story is the theme of identity. Wes has never been able to create an individual identity apart from things in his life (possibly because he was married and had two children by the age of 19). Originally, he finds his identity in alcohol, but is able to replace that identity with one wrapped up in Chef's house. Chef's house comes to symbolize his recovery, safety, and a better life, however, no matter what he does, Wes cannot escape the fact that ultimately the house belongs to Chef as well as everything inside it. Thus, it can never be his own identity. That realization devastates Wes, and causes him to turn back to his original identity, involving alcohol.

Starting over

In the story, starting over is linked with the idea of identity in the sense of someone trying to create another life and a new vision for himself/herself. By the end of the story, however, Wes has lost all faith in the possibility of anyone genuinely starting afresh since, as he puts it, "If I was somebody else, I wouldn't be me. But I'm who I am." To go through the "what if" situations and to pretend to start over is to try to become someone else and have someone else's life. Wes sees this as unrealistic and thus, makes the decision to give into the "self" he was originally, that of an alcoholic.

Storytelling

Storytelling has always been an important part of Raymond Carver's stories. "Chef's House" is unusual, however, in that, unlike most of Carver's stories, the dialogue between characters is not within quotation marks. Thus, the whole story seems to be more like Edna's recounting of all the events to a friend after the fact, rather than the action happening in real-time. Also unusual, is the fact that it is Edna recounting the story, rather than Wes. Most of Carver's works come from the male perspective and more often from the alcoholic, rather than the alcoholic's wife. These changes give a special twist to "Chef's House" and reinforce the questions about identity from throughout the story.

== Additional resources ==
- Carver, Raymond. "Chef's House." Where I'm Calling From: Selected Stories. New York: Vintage Contemporaries, 1989. 297-302.
- Stull, William PhD.. "Chronology." Ed. Tess Gallagher
