= Cathedral (short story collection) =

1983 short story collection by Raymond Carver

- First edition cover, 1983
- Author: Raymond Carver
- Language: English
- Genre: Short story
- Publisher: Knopf
- Publication date: 1983
- Publication place: United States
- Media type: Print
- Pages: 228
- Dewey Decimal: 813/.54
- LC Class: PS3553.A7894 C3 1983

Cathedral is the third major-press collection of short stories by American writer Raymond Carver, published in 1983. It received critical acclaim and was a finalist for the 1984 Pulitzer Prize for Fiction.

== Reception ==
Cathedral was enthusiastically received by critics. In The New York Times Book Review, critic Irving Howe wrote:

Mr. Carver has been mostly a writer of strong but limited effects - the sort of writer who shapes and twists his material to a high point of stylization. In his newest collection of stories, Cathedral, there are a few that suggest he is moving toward a greater ease of manner and generosity of feeling; but in most of his work it's his own presence, the hard grip of his will, that is the strongest force. It's not that he imposes moral or political judgments; in that respect, he's quite self-effacing. It's that his abrupt rhythms and compressions come to be utterly decisive."

The Washington Post wrote that "there are no arid places in Cathedral. Instead there are a dozen stories that overflow with the danger, excitement, mystery and possibility of life."

== The stories ==
The collection contains the following stories:

- "Feathers" - A couple visit another couple for dinner. The men know each other from work, the couples otherwise do not know each other. The couple they are visiting have an obnoxious noisy peacock as a pet and a plaster mold of the wife's terrible teeth before they were straightened. The wife is grateful to her husband for these gifts. After dinner, the couple bring out their baby, who is strikingly ugly.
- "Chef's House" - Wes rents Chef's house by the ocean and asks wife Edna to come live with him again.
- "Preservation" - Sandy's husband has taken to the sofa since he lost his job as a roofer three months before.
- "The Compartment" - Myers, vacationing in Europe, takes a train to meet his son, who he hasn't seen in eight years.
- "A Small, Good Thing" - An extended version of his earlier short story "The Bath". Scotty, 8, is hit by a car.
- "Vitamins" - Patti decides to sell vitamins door-to-door.
- "Careful" - Lloyd and wife Inez are living separately but she helps him with a problem.
- "Where I'm Calling From" - At Frank Martin's drying out facility with JP, Tiny, and other residents.
- "The Train" - Miss Dent waits in a train station late at night after she used a gun to force a man to kneel and plead for his life.
- "Fever" - Carlyle has trouble finding a babysitter after his wife leaves him and the kids for California.
- "The Bridle" - Marge, a woman who supervises an apartment building in Arizona with her husband Harley, tells the story about a family that moves into an apartment after being displaced from their farm in Minnesota.
- "Cathedral" - Narrated by a man whose wife is old friends with a blind man, the story shows the husband/narrator's distaste for the blind man who is coming to visit him and his wife for a few days. At times it seems that the man is jealous of the blind man for being so close to his wife; at other times it seems that the husband is disgusted by the man's blindness. In the end they bond in a way through the communication they share about what a cathedral looks like.
