= Vitamins (short story) =

- Short story by Raymond Carver
- Language: English

Publication
- Published in: Granta
- Publication date: Spring 1981

"Vitamins" is a short story by American author Raymond Carver. It was originally published in the Spring 1981 edition of Granta magazine and later in 1983, in the short story collection Cathedral.

== Plot ==
"Vitamins" begins with an unnamed male narrator telling the story of how his wife starts a home business selling vitamins. His wife Patti starts selling vitamins because she wants a job for her self-respect. Patti takes her job very seriously and she feels hurt when girls quit on her. One night one of her employees, a girl named Sheila makes a pass at Patti by telling her she loves Patti. Then she grabs Patti's breast. Patti tells her she "doesn’t swing that way", but says that she loves Sheila, just not in the way Sheila loves her.

After that incident, the narrator describes a party that he and Patti hold for all of Patti's employees. The vitamin business was not doing as well as before so Patti holds a party to cheer all her employees up. All the girls are dancing with other girls, but the narrator dances with a girl named Donna. Sheila is the first person to get drunk and pass out. The narrator and Patti move Sheila's sleeping body out onto the porch and they forget about her. The party winds down and the narrator makes attempts to have sex with Donna. Donna tells him not now and she leaves the party. Sheila wakes up and walks into the house. After complaining, she asks the narrator where Patti is and that Patti has to take her to the hospital. The narrator says that Patti is asleep and he kicks Sheila out of the house. The next morning Patti asks the narrator where Sheila is and he tells her that she went to Portland. Patti complains of dreaming of vitamins and that her life is becoming consumed by vitamins.

A couple of days after the party the narrator invites Donna to a bar called the Off-Broadway for a drink. He describes it as a "spade" bar. While there, a man named Benny approaches them. Benny walks over with his friend Nelson, a veteran of Vietnam who has just arrived home. Nelson jokes about how Donna and the narrator are not married and that they must be good friends. To tease them, he pulls out a box with a cut off ear from a Vietnamese soldier. Khaki, the owner of the bar walks over asks if everything is alright. Benny assures him that everything is fine. Nelson then offers Donna a couple hundred dollars to 'French' him (perform oral sex). The narrator and Donna leave, disgusted. While in his car, Donna remarks that she could have used the money and that she is deciding to leave for Portland.

The narrator returns home. He pours himself a glass of Scotch and he takes it into his bathroom. Patti wakes up and runs into the bathroom, fully clothed. She yells at the narrator saying that he let her oversleep and that she has to get to work to sell vitamins. The narrator tells her to go back to sleep. The story ends with the narrator commenting that all the medicine was falling out of the medicine cabinet.

== Themes ==
Alcohol plays a part in all of the situations with the characters. Alcohol is seen to have negative effect on the lives of all of the characters. Especially with the character of Sheila who passes out on the porch during the party. When the narrator takes Donna to the "spade" bar, the alcohol plays a part in the scene by setting the tone of the scene as being "underground".

The Vitamins can also be interpreted as being metaphors for alcohol. The narrator is seen to be drinking alcohol throughout the story and the vitamins may represent the negative effects played out in the life of his wife, Patti. Patti constantly thinks about vitamins in much the way that an alcoholic thinks about drinking. Patti confides to the narrator that she feels suffocated by vitamins, and that she wants to escape from vitamins. These feelings are similar to ones that an alcoholic feels and in the end, the vitamins are seen to be destroying the marriage.
