= Margaret Pokiak-Fenton =

Inuvialuk author (1969–2021)

- Occupation: Writer
- Spouse: Lyle Fenton
- Writing career
- Period: From 2010 to 2021
- Genre: Children's literature

Margaret Olemaun Pokiak-Fenton (June 7, 1936 – April 21, 2021) was an Inuvialuk author of children's books, story keeper, and residential school survivor.

== Personal life ==
Margaret Pokiak (or Olemaun) was born June 7, 1936, on Baillie Island, NWT Canada. Her family went to Banks Island, where they would hunt during the winter, and remained there until she was eight years old. As a child, she learned how to drive a dog-sled, hunt, and travelled on a schooner on a regular basis to gather supplies.

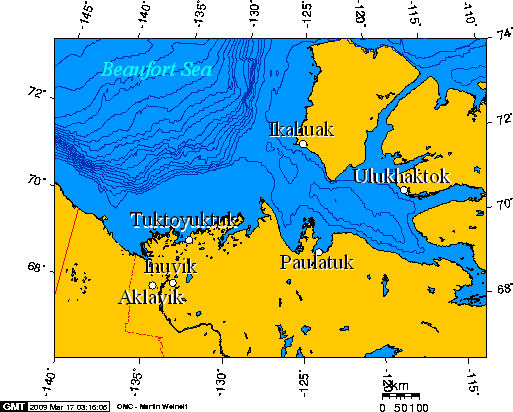
Pokiak-Fenton's community of the Inuvialuit settlement region

When she was eight years old she travelled to Aklavik, a fur trading settlement founded by her great-grandfather, to attend the Immaculate Conception residential school, run by the Roman Catholic Church. She had a strong desire to learn how to read and begged to go to the school, despite its horrific reputation. Her book Fatty Legs describes this experience and reveals her eagerness to learn how to read and her desire to join school, in spite of the oppressive atmosphere present in these schools. After Pokiak-Fenton entered residential school she did not see her parents for two years. In a 2020 interview with Shelagh Rogers on CBC's The Next Chapter, Pokiak-Fenton related that over the two years she forgot her language, food, and "everything." When she returned home she could no longer communicate with her mother because her mother did not speak English.

After two years of schooling, Pokiak-Fenton moved back to her family, which was in Tuktoyaktuk at the time. Although she had a challenging time at the Immaculate Conception residential school, she returned to school to accompany her younger sisters.

Later she began her work for the Hudson's Bay Company. In Tuktoyaktuk, she also met Lyle Fenton, her future husband. Lyle was working on the DEW Line Project. They moved together to Fort St. John, British Columbia, where they raised a family of eight children.

Pokiak-Fenton was a fixture at the farmers' market at Fort St. John where she was locally famous for her beadwork, embroidery, and bannock. Her book, Fatty Legs, was initially sold only at the farmers' market.

Pokiak-Fenton would not speak about her experience in residential school for much of her life. However, after writing Fatty Legs she began to speak more about her experience. Encouraged by her daughter-in-law Christy Jordan-Fenton, she told her story of the hardships of residential school so her grandchildren and other children would learn the truth of the experiences. When Pokiak-Fenton wrote her first book and began to speak at schools and libraries, many people in Canada did not know about residential schools.

Pokiak-Fenton returned to using her birth name of Olemaun at the age of 80. Olemaun means the stone that sharpens an ulu knife. Pokiak-Fenton had changed to using the name Margaret as a child and no longer felt a connection to her culture due to the assimilation process enforced at the residential school. According to her daughter-in-law she received a traditional tattoo of a caribou at age 81.

Pokiak-Fenton died on April 21, 2021. She was predeceased by her husband Lyle.

== Writing career ==
Pokiak-Fenton co-wrote a number of books with her daughter-in-law, Christy Jordan-Fenton. Her stories relayed the horrors of the residential school system in terms that could be understood by young readers. Her stories also relayed the experience of living in the north of Canada. Pokiak-Fenton and Jordan-Fenton extensively toured Canada, and also visited the United States and Cuba, to tell the story of residential schools, making 100 school and library visits a year.

Although reluctant at first, writing and relating about her experiences of residential school, loss and recovery of culture, and resiliency in the face of hardship became a mission for Pokiak-Fenton. Her work is notable because stories for children about residential school written by survivors were so rare. In numerous interviews and articles she related that many survivors do not speak of their experiences. She is quoted in an article saying: “So many of them have problems that they put out of their mind, but deep inside they just don’t know how to cope with it. But then my book gave a lot of people a chance for hope. I think that’s why, when they read the book, it makes them understand so much more than they ever knew.” Her writing became an important way to teach children and formed the basis of numerous lesson plans with elementary school systems.

Pokiak-Fenton's books frequently appear on recommended readings lists, especially in relation to the experiences of Indigenous peoples in Canada. All four of her books were included in a list of 48 titles curated by writer David A. Robertson featured on the CBC website after the announcement that the bodies of 251 children were confirmed in an unmarked burial at the Kamloops Indian Residential School.

== Publications ==
=== Fatty Legs (2010) ===
Fatty Legs: A True Story, published by Annick Press in 2010, was Pokiak-Fenton's first picture book and was inspired by her experiences at residential school. She co-wrote the book with her daughter-in-law, Christy Jordan-Fenton. Fatty Legs was illustrated by Liz Amini-Holmes and includes archival photographs from Pokiak-Fenton's collection. A tenth anniversary edition was released in 2020 and included a new foreword by Dr. Debbie Reese and a new preface by Christy Jordan-Fenton.

The story introduces children to the devastating reality of the residential school system, a system which was focused on assimilation of Indigenous peoples. The book was published two years before the work of the Truth and Reconciliation Commission began to investigate the residential school system and was among the first children's books from a survivor of Canada's Indian Residential School System.

Fatty Legs received positive critical reception and was included on many recommended books lists as a way to introduce children to the history and trauma of the residential school system in an age-appropriate way.

Fatty Legs was a finalist for the Sheila A. Egoff Children’s Literature Prize. Fatty Legs was named one of the 10 best children’s books of the year by the Globe and Mail.

Fatty Legs formed part of a controversy in November 2020 when it came out that an assignment at W. A. Fraser Middle School in Abbotsford, British Columbia, was using the book to show the positive side of residential school. In a newspaper article Jordan-Fenton stated using the book out of context was “irresponsible at best, and intentionally or unintentionally, it is revisionism and the perpetuation of a falsehood.”

=== A Stranger At Home (2011) ===
A Stranger At Home, published November 1, 2011, by Annick Press, is a sequel to Fatty Legs and follows Margaret as she returns home to her family after two years at residential school. The book was co-written with Christy Jordan-Fenton and illustrated by Liz Amini-Holmes. Annick Press has documented the age range of A Stranger At Home as ages 9-12.

The story follows Margaret's difficulties fitting back into her home and family life and the challenges of losing connections to her culture. Pokiak-Fenton has related that she hoped to reflect the way she felt disconnected from her family, something she said was not talked about often by survivors of residential schools but frequently experienced.

The book won numerous awards and is on frequent recommendation lists.

=== When I Was Eight (2013) ===
When I was Eight, published by Annick Press in 2013, is a picture book memoir for children ages 5 to 9. The nonfiction story is centred on Pokiak-Fenton's life as she convinces her father to send her to residential school so she can learn to read. It documents the vicious treatment she received at the school, particularly from one nun, having her hair cut, being locked in a dark basement, and the humiliation of being given red socks as a punishment. The story also speaks to the power of literature and of resiliency and fortitude.

=== Not My Girl (2014) ===
Not My Girl, published by Annick Press on July 1, 2014, is a non-fiction picture book memoir that tells the story of Margaret Pokiak-Fenton's return home after two years at residential school. It tells the story of Margaret's mother angrily saying “Not my girl!” because Pokiak-Fenton's hair is short, she no longer speaks the language of her family, has forgotten how to hunt and fish, and does not like her family's food. She has lost her culture and the trust of her family. However, over time, Pokiak-Fenton relearns her culture and is given a dogsled of her own.

The story serves as a way to instruct children about the role residential schools played in the loss of culture but also resiliency and cultural recovery. The Kirkus Review states that the "authors deal gently with the child’s trauma, showing how, in every case, things get better."

== Awards and honours ==
Fatty Legs was named one of the ten best children's books of the year by The Globe and Mail in 2011.

The Ontario Library Association included A Stranger At Home on their annual Best Bets List.

Canadian Toy Testing Council and TD Summer Reading Club included When I Was Eight on recommended reading lists.

The Center for the Study of Multicultural Children's Literature named Not My Girl one of the best multicultural children's books of 2014.

Fatty Legs, A Stranger at Home, When I Was Eight, and Not My Girl have all been named some of the best books for kids and teens by the Canadian Children's Book Centre.

Awards for Pokiak-Fenton's writing
Year	Title	Title	Award	Result
2011	Fatty Legs	First Nation Communities Read Award	Winner	
2011	Fatty Legs	Next Generation Indie Book Awards for Children's/Juvenile Nonfiction	Finalist	
2011	Fatty Legs	Sheila A. Egoff Children’s Literature Prize	Shortlist	
2011	Fatty Legs	USBBY Outstanding International Books	Selection	
2012	Fatty Legs	Hackmatack Children's Choice Book Award for Non-fiction	Shortlist	
2012	Fatty Legs	Ontario Library Association's Golden Oak Award	Shortlist	
2012	A Stranger At Home	Independent Publishers Book Award	Winner	
2012	A Stranger At Home	International Youth Library's White Ravens Collection	Selection	
2012	A Stranger At Home	Next Generation Indie Book Awards for Children's/Juvenile Nonfiction	Finalist	
2012	A Stranger At Home	Skipping Stones Book Award	Honor	
2012	A Stranger At Home	USBBY Outstanding International Books	Selection	
2012	A Stranger At Home	VOYA Nonfiction Honor List	Selection	
2013	When I Was Eight	Christie Harris Illustrated Children’s Literature Prize	Finalist	
2015	Not My Girl	Chocolate Lily Award	Shortlist	
2015	Not My Girl	da Vinci Eye Award	Finalist	
2015	Not My Girl	Information Book Award	Shortlist	
2015	Not My Girl	Skipping Stones Book Award	Honor	
2015	Not My Girl	Storytelling World Award	Honor	
