= Jella-Lepman Medal =

The Jella Lepman medal is an award made to individuals and institutions that have made lasting contributions to children's literature. It is named after Jella Lepman (1891-1970), founder of the International Board on Books for Young People (IBBY) and the International Youth Library (IYL) in Munich. It was created in 1991 to celebrate her 100th birthday. It was reinstated in 2005.

== Recipients of the Jella Lepman Medal, 1991 ==
Individuals

- Richard Bamberger, Vienna (Austria) - founding member of IBBY and former President
- Jo Tenfjord, Oslo (Norway) - founding member of IBBY and former Vice President
- Fritz Brunner, Zurich (Switzerland) - founding member of IBBY and former treasurer
- John Donovan, New York (USA) - former treasurer of IBBY

Institutions/organisations

- Pro Juventute, Zurich (Switzerland)
- International Youth Library, Munich (Germany)
- Biennale of Illustrations, Bratislava (Slovakia)
- Bologna International Children’s Book Fair, Bologna (Italy)
- The Asahi Shimbun Newspaper Company, Tokyo (Japan)
- IBBY Documentation Centre of Books for Disabled Young People, Oslo (Norway)

== Recipients of the Jella Lepman Medal, 2006 ==
- Hideo Yamada, Okayama Prefecture (Japan) - President of the Yamada Apiculture Center Inc. for his generous support of IBBY and its projects through the IBBY-Yamada Fund
- The Nissan Motor Co., Tokyo (Japan) - as tribute for their longstanding support of the Hans Christian Andersen Awards
- Vincent Frank-Steiner, Basel (Switzerland) - for his expert financial advice

== Recipients of the Jella Lepman Medal, 2010 ==
- Joan Glazer, Warwick (Rhode Island, USA) - in acknowledgement of her magnificent contribution to IBBY as President of Bookbird Inc Board.

== Recipients of the Jella Lepman medal, 2014 ==
- Nami Island Inc. (South Korea) - for their sponsorship of the Hans Christian Andersen Award

== Recipients of the Jella Lepman medal, 2018 ==
- Katherine Paterson (USA) - in gratitude and recognition of her outstanding contribution to IBBY
