= Fatty Legs =

2010 non-fiction children's book

- First edition
- Author: Christy Jordan-Fenton and Margaret Pokiak-Fenton
- Illustrator: Liz Amini-Holmes
- Language: English
- Subject: Canadian Indian residential school system
- Genre: Memoir
- Publisher: Annick Press
- Publication date: September 1, 2010
- Media type: Print, Audio
- Pages: 104
- ISBN: 9781554512461
- Followed by: A Stranger at Home

Fatty Legs is a memoir aimed at middle-grade children, written by Christy Jordan-Fenton and Margaret Pokiak-Fenton and illustrated by Liz Amini-Holmes, published September 1, 2010 by Annick Press. The story is about the residential school system, a system focused on the assimilation of Indigenous peoples.

A tenth anniversary edition was released in 2020 and included a new foreword by Dr. Debbie Reese and a new preface by Christy Jordan-Fenton.

Fatty Legs was later followed by A Stranger at Home, as well as editions for younger readers entitled When I Was Eight and Not My Girl. The four books "have sold more than a quarter of a million copies and collected over 20 awards and distinctions."

== Plot ==
When Pokiak-Fenton was eight years old, a residential school opened nearby, and with the dream of learning to read, she begged her parents to go. However, upon arrival, one of the nuns is cruel to her.

== Reception ==
Fatty Legs received positive critical reception and was included on many recommended books lists as a way to introduce children to the history and trauma of the residential school system in an age-appropriate way.

Kirkus provided a starred review, calling the memoir "[a] moving and believable account" of Canadian residential schools. School Library Journal's Jody Kopple called it "[a]n excellent addition to any biography collection," noting, "the book is fascinating and unique, and yet universal in its message."

Fatty Legs formed part of a controversy in November 2020 when it came out that an assignment at W. A. Fraser Middle School in Abbotsford, British Columbia was using the book to show the positive side of residential school. Jordan-Fenton stated using the book out of context was “irresponsible at best, and intentionally or unintentionally, it is revisionism and the perpetuation of a falsehood.”

In 2010, Fatty Legs was named one of the best children's books of the year by The Globe and Mail. Ten years later, the Canadian Children's Book Centre included it on their list of the Best Books for Kids & Teens.

Awards and honours for Fatty Legs
| Year | Award | Result | Ref. |
|---|---|---|---|
| 2011 | First Nation Communities Read Award | Winner | |
| 2011 | Next Generation Indie Book Awards for Children's/Juvenile Nonfiction | Finalist | |
| 2011 | Sheila A. Egoff Children’s Literature Prize | Shortlist | |
| 2011 | USBBY Outstanding International Books | Selection | |
| 2012 | Hackmatack Children's Choice Book Award for Non-fiction | Shortlist | |
| 2012 | Ontario Library Association's Golden Oak Award | Shortlist | |
| 2012 | Skipping Stones Book Award | Honor | |
