= A Stranger at Home =

2012 non-fiction children's book

- First edition
- Author: Christy Jordan-Fenton and Margaret Pokiak-Fenton
- Illustrator: Liz Amini-Holmes
- Language: English
- Subject: Canadian Indian residential school system
- Genre: Memoir
- Publisher: Annick Press
- Publication date: September 1, 2011
- Media type: Print, audio
- Pages: 112
- ISBN: 9781554513611
- Preceded by: Fatty Legs

A Stranger at Home is a memoir aimed at middle-grade children, written by Christy Jordan-Fenton and Margaret (Olemaun) Pokiak-Fenton and illustrated by Liz Amini-Holmes, published September 1, 2011 by Annick Press. The book follows Margaret Pokiak's experience of returning home to her family after living at a residential school for two years.

A Stranger at Home was preceded by Fatty Legs, both of which were later revised for younger readers and published under the titles When I Was Eight and Not My Girl. The four books "have sold more than a quarter of a million copies and collected over 20 awards and distinctions."

== Plot ==
At age eight, fascinated by the possibility of reading, Margaret Pokiak-Fenton asks her parents if she can attend the nearby religious school instead of her Arctic school, not knowing the dangers of the residential school system. While at the school, she is unable to speak her language or connect to her culture in any way.

Two years later, Margaret returns home a stranger with short cropped hair and the outsiders' perspective of the world, and she has lost many of the skills and enjoyments of life with her family. Although she is thrilled to return home, her mother doesn't recognize the person she has become and angrily yells, "Not my girl!"

Over time, Margaret readjusts to life at home with her family and community.

== Reception ==
A Stranger at Home received a positive review from Kirkus Reviews, who noted, "Olemaun's spirit and determination shine through this moving memoir."

The Ontario Library Association included A Stranger at Home on their annual Best Bets List, and the Canadian Children's Book Centre named it one of the best books for kids and teens.

Awards for A Stranger at Home
Year	Award	Result	Ref.
2012	Independent Publishers Book Award	Winner	
2012	International Youth Library's White Ravens Collection	Selection	
2012	Next Generation Indie Book Awards for Children's/Juvenile Nonfiction	Finalist	
2012	Skipping Stones Book Award	Honor	
2012	USBBY Outstanding International Books	Selection	
2012	VOYA Nonfiction Honor List	Selection	
