= Yihyeon =

South Korean writer, born 1970

- Born: 1970 (age 55–56); Busan, South Korea
- Occupations: Children's Author, Novelist
- Writing career
- Language: Korean
- Genre: Children's Literature

Yihyeon (Korean: 이현) is a South Korean children's author and novelist. She has written works of animal fantasy, young adult fiction, historical fiction, and science fiction. She made her debut as a writer in 2006 with the short story collection Your Noodles Will Get All Mushy! Her major works include the children's books Planet of Robots, Play Ball, and Wanini the Green Lioness, a young adult novel, 1945, Cheolwon, and a picture book, I'm Opportunity, a Mars Exploration Rover. In 2022, Wanini the Green Lioness was selected for the IBBY Honour List, and 1945, Cheolwon was named as one of the twenty outstanding titles by the jury of the 2022 Hans Christian Andersen Awards.

== Biography ==
Yihyeon was born in Busan, South Korea. She received her bachelor's degree in Korean language and literature from Sookmyung Women's University. She formerly owned a bookstore. While working at various jobs, she began to write fiction.

In 2012, she won the Second Changwon Children’s Literature Award for Planet of Robots. In 2022, Wanini the Green Lioness was selected for the IBBY Honour List in the Writing category, and 1945, Cheolwon was named as one of twenty outstanding titles by the jury of the 2022 Hans Christian Andersen Awards.

In 2012, Yi released 1945, Cheolwon, about the history of the period of Korea’s independence from Japanese rule through the eyes of young people. In 2013, she published Seoul in the Summer of That Year, a novel set during the Korean War. In Hooray for Jang-soo!, she writes of the dangers of violence that may go unnoticed in the lives of young children and adolescents. In many of her works, such as I’m on My Way to the Silk Road, The Secret of Yeondong-dong, and Wanini the Green Lioness, the adventures are led by female protagonists. The sci-fi feature "Robot Star" also features girl-type robots as the main characters. The sci-fi novel series Planet of Robots also features female robots as protagonists.

== Awards and honours ==
- 2022 Nominated by IBBY on the Hans Christian Andersen Awards - 1945, Cheolwon

== Works as writer ==
- 2020 The Secret of Yeondong-dong (Changbi Publishers) ISBN 9788936443108
- 2019 Fighters of Legend (Changbi Publishers) ISBN 9788936447519
- 2019 Wanini the Green Lioness 2 (Changbi Publishers) ISBN 9788936443054
- 2019 I'm Opportunity, a Mars Exploration Rover (Manmanbooks) ISBN 9791189499051
- 2016 Play Ball (Hankyoreh Publishing Company) ISBN 9788984319851
- 2015 Wanini the Green Lioness (Changbi Publishers)ISBN 9788936442804
- 2013 Seoul in the summer of that year (Munhakdongne Publishing Group) ISBN 9788936456511
- 2012 1945, Cheolwon (Munhakdongne Publishing Group) ISBN 9788936456443
- 2012 Our Scandal (Munhakdongne Publishing Group) ISBN 9788936456016
- 2012 I'm on My Way to The Silk Road (Prunsoop publishing Co. Ltd.) ISBN 9788971846841
- 2011 Planet of Robots (Prunsoop publishing Co. Ltd.) ISBN 9788971849255
- 2010 Planet of Robots 3 (Prunsoop publishing Co. Ltd.) ISBN 9788971846476
- 2010 Planet of Robots 2 (Prunsoop publishing Co. Ltd.) ISBN 9788971846469
- 2010 Planet of Robots 1 (Prunsoop publishing Co. Ltd.) ISBN 9788971846452
- 2006 Your Noodles Will Get All Mushy! (Changbi Publishers) ISBN 9788936442248
