= PMC Indigenous Literature Awards =

Annual Canadian literary award presented to Indigenous Canadian writers

The Periodical Marketers of Canada Indigenous Literature Awards, also known as the First Nation Communities Read Awards, is an annual Canadian literary award presented to Indigenous Canadian writers.

First Nation Communities Read was established in 2003 to help bring awareness to and support First Nation, Métis, and Inuit authors, publishers, and illustrators. In 2012, Periodical Markers of Canada signed on and has since provided winners with a $5,000 prize.

First Nation Communities Read receives support from the Government of Canada, the Ontario Library Service, publishers, librarians, and the general public.

== Recipients ==
PMC Indigenous Literature Awards winners and finalists
Year	Category	Author	Title	Result	Ref.
2003-2004		Tomson Highway with Brian Deines (illus.)	Dragonfly Kites	Winner	
2004-2005		Andrea Spalding	Solomon’s Tree	Winner	
2005-2006		Jan Bourdeau Waboose	Sky Sisters	Winner	
2006-2007		Larry Loyie	As Long as the Rivers Flow	Winner	
2007-2008	No Award Presented				
2008-2009		Leo Yerxa	Ancient Thunder	Winner	
2009-2010		Sylvia Olsen	Which Way Should I Go?	Winner	
2010-2011		David Bouchard-Fenton and Margaret Pokiak-Fenton	Long Powwow Nights	Winner	
2011-2012		Christy Jordan-Fenton and Margaret Pokiak-Fenton with Liz Amini-Holmes (illus.)	Fatty Legs	Winner	
2012-2013		Janet Wilson	Shannen and the Dream for a School	Winner	
2013-2014		Richard Wagamese	Indian Horse	Winner	
2013-2014		Drew Hayden Taylor	Motorcycles and Sweetgrass	Shortlist	
2013-2014		Dawn Dumont	Nobody Cries at Bingo	Shortlist	
2013-2014		Christy Jordan-Fenton and Margaret Pokiak-Fenton with Liz Amini-Holmes (illus.)	A Stranger at Home: A True Story	Shortlist	
2013-2014		David Alexander Robertson with Scott B. Henderson (illus.)	Sugar Falls: A Residential School Story	Shortlist	
2014-2015	Children's	Julie Flett	Wildberries / Pakwa che Menisu	Winner	
2014-2015	Children's	Roy Henry Vickers	Raven Brings the Light	Shortlist	
2014-2015	Children's	Rene Andre Meshake	Moccasin Creek	Shortlist	
2014-2015	Children's	Victor Lethbridge	Little Chief and the Gifts of the Morning Star	Shortlist	
2014-2015	Children's	Leah Dorion	The Diamond Willow Walking Stick	Shortlist	
2015-2016		Darrell Dennis	Peace Pipe Dreams: The Truth about Lies about Indians	Winner	
2015-2016		Edmund Metatawabin and Alexandra Shimo	Up Ghost River	Shortlist	
2015-2016		Lisa Charleyboy and Mary Leatherdale (Eds.)	Dreaming in Indian: Contemporary Native American Voices	Shortlist	
2015-2016		Dawn Dumont	Rose’s Run	Shortlist	
2015-2016		Jordin Tootoo	All the Way: My Life on Ice	Shortlist	
2016-2017	Children's	Jennifer Harrington with Michael Arnott (illus.)	Spirit Bear	Winner	
2016-2017	Children's	Celina Kalluk	Sweetest Kulu	Shortlist	
2016-2017	Children's	Danielle Daniel	Sometimes I Feel Like a Fox	Shortlist	
2016-2017	Children's	Alan Syliboy	The Thundermaker	Shortlist	
2016-2017	Children's	Sandy Tharp-Thee	The Apple Tree	Shortlist	
2017-2018		Carol Rose Daniels	Bearskin Diary	Winner	
2018-2019	Children's	Joanne Robertson	The Water Walker	Winner	
2018-2019	Children's	David Robertson	When We Were Alone	Shortlist	
2018-2019	Children's	Monique Gray Smith	My Heart Fills with Happiness	Shortlist	
2018-2019	Children's	Sherri Maret	The Cloud Artist	Shortlist	
2018-2019	Children's	Deborah Kigjugalik Webster	Akilak's Adventure	Shortlist	
2018-2019	Young Adult/Adult	Tanya Talaga	Seven Fallen Feathers	Winner	
2019-2020	Children's	Cindy Blackstock	Spirit Bear: Fishing for Knowledge, Catching Dreams	Winner	
2019-2020	Children's	Theresa Meuse-Dallien	The Gathering	Shortlist	
2019-2020	Children's	Dallas Hunt	Awâsis and the World-Famous Bannock	Shortlist	
2019-2020	Children's	Jeannette C. Armstrong	Neekna and Chemai	Shortlist	
2019-2020	Children's	Roselynn Akulukjuk	Putuguq & Kublu and the Qalupalik!	Shortlist	
2019-2020	Young Adult/Adult	Monique Gray Smith	Tilly and the Crazy Eights	Winner	
2020-2021	Children's	Clayton Gauthier	The Bear’s Medicine	Winner	
2020-2021	Children's	Rebecca Thomas and Pauline Young	I'm Finding My Talk	Shortlist	
2020-2021	Children's	Ida Tremblay and Miriam Körner	When We Had Sled Dogs	Shortlist	
2020-2021	Children's	Nancy Cooper, Heather Charles, Myrtle Jamieson, and Milena Vujanovic	E Meshkwadooniged Mitig /The Trading Tree	Shortlist	
2020-2021	Children's	Sylvia Olsen, Odelia Smith and Sheena Lott	Neekah's Knitting Needles	Shortlist	
2020-2021	Young Adult/Adult	Drew Hayden Taylor	Chasing Painted Horses	Winner	
2020-2021	Young Adult/Adult	Alicia Elliott	A Mind Spread Out on the Ground		
2020-2021	Young Adult/Adult	Brianna Jonnie	If I Go Missing		
2020-2021	Young Adult/Adult	Helen Knott	In My Own Moccasins		
2020-2021	Young Adult/Adult	Karen McBride	Crow Winter		
2021-2022	Children's	Bridget George	It’s a Mitig!	Winner	
2021-2022	Children's	Serapio Ittusardjuat	How I Survived: Four Nights on the Ice	Shortlist	
2021-2022	Children's	Mary Qamaniq-Mason and Kevin Qamaniq-Mason	I Am Loved	Shortlist	
2021-2022	Children's	Suzie Napayok-Short	Kits, Cubs, and Calves: An Arctic Summer	Shortlist	
2021-2022	Children's	Robert Budd with Roy Henry Vickers (illus.)	Raven Squawk, Orca Squeak	Shortlist	
2021-2022	Children's	Charlene Bearhead and Wilson Bearhead	Siha Tooskin Knows the Strength of His Hair	Shortlist	
2021-2022	Children's	Rebecca Thomas	Swift Fox All Along	Shortlist	
2021-2022	Children's	Monique Gray Smith with Nicole Neidhardt (illus.)	When We Are Kind	Shortlist	
2021-2022	Young Adult/Adult	Phyllis Webstad and Joan Sorley	Orange Shirt Day	Winner	
2021-2022	Young Adult/Adult	David A. Robertson	Black Water	Shortlist	
2021-2022	Young Adult/Adult	Michelle Good	Five Little Indians	Shortlist	
2021-2022	Young Adult/Adult	Bevann Fox	Genocidal Love: A Life after Residential School	Shortlist	
2021-2022	Young Adult/Adult	Nathan Adler	Ghost Lake	Shortlist	
2022	Children's	Lisa Boivin	We Dream Medicine Dreams	Winner	
2022	Children's	S.P. Joseph Lyons	Little Bear in Foster Care	Winner	
2022	Young Adult/Adult	Carol Anne Hilton	Indigenomics: Taking a Seat at the Economic Table	Winner	
2023	Children's	Marty Wilson-Trudeau	Phoenix Gets Greater	Winner	
2023	Young Adult/Adult	Joseph Kakwinokanasum	My Indian Summer	Winner	
