= Jean Mills =

Canadian young adult and children's novelist

- Born: 1955 (age 70–71)
- Education: Queen's University
- Occupations: Novelist, freelance writer
- Writing career
- Pen name: Lillian Stone
- Website: jeanmillswriter.com

Jean Mills (born 1955) is a Canadian young adult and children's novelist, based in Guelph, Ontario. In addition to her novels and freelance writing, she has also served as a writing workshop presenter at the Eden Mills Writers' Festival and writer-in-residence at St. John's-Kilmarnock School.

== Publications ==
- After the Wallpaper Music (Pajama Press, 2024)
- Wingman (Orca Book Publishers, 2023)
- Bliss Adair and the First Rule of Knitting (Red Deer Press, 2023)
- The Legend (Red Deer Press, 2021)
- Larkin on the Shore (Red Deer Press, 2019)
- Skating Over Thin Ice (Red Deer Press, 2018)
- Dude! (with Heather Wright) (Marden Publishing, 2014)
- Andrew and the Babysitter (writing as Lillian Stone) (Caramel Tree, 2012)
- Joey and the Firehall Ghost (writing as Lillian Stone) (Caramel Tree, 2012)
- The Ugly Duckling (writing as Lillian Stone) (Caramel Tree, 2012)
- The Toymaker's Son (Pugwash Publishers, 2009)
- Abby and the Curling Chicks (Pugwash Publishers, 2003)
- The Legacy (Nelson Canada, 1991)
- Wild Dog Summer (Nelson Canada, 1990; re-issued by Pugwash Publishers, 2008)

== Reception ==
- Whippoorwill Book Award for Rural YA Literature -- Larkin on the Shore (2020)
- USBBY Outstanding International Books List -- Skating Over Thin Ice (2019)
- Nominee for the Forest of Reading Red Maple Award -- Skating Over Thin Ice (2019)
- Winner of the Professional Writers Association of Canada Barbara Novak Award for Memoir/Humour Writing -- "the roots of her story," published in The Globe and Mail (2009)
