= Not My Girl =

2014 non-fiction children's book

- First edition cover of Not My Girl
- Author: Christy Jordan-Fenton and Margaret Pokiak-Fenton
- Illustrator: Gabrielle Grimard
- Language: English
- Publisher: Annick Press
- Publication date: January 9, 2014
- Media type: Print (hardcover, paperback)

Not My Girl is a memoir aimed at children, written by Christy Jordan-Fenton and Margaret Pokiak-Fenton and illustrated by Gabrielle Grimard, published January 9, 2014, by Annick Press. The book follows Margaret Pokiak's experience of returning home at age ten after attending a residential school for two years.

Not My Girl was adapted from the 2011 memoir A Stranger At Home. The book collection also includes Fatty Legs and When I Was Eight. The four books "have sold more than a quarter of a million copies and collected over 20 awards and distinctions."

== Plot ==
At age eight, fascinated by the possibility of reading, Margaret Pokiak-Fenton asked her parents if she could attend the nearby religious school instead of her Arctic school, not knowing the dangers of the residential school system. While at the school, she could not speak her language or connect to her culture in any way.

Two years later, Margaret returned home a stranger with short cropped hair and the outsiders' perspective of the world, and she has lost many of the skills and enjoyments of life with her family. Although she is thrilled to return home, her mother doesn't recognize the person she has become and angrily yells, "Not my girl!"

Over time, Margaret readjusted to life at home with her family and community.

== Reception ==
Not My Girl received a starred review from Kirkus Reviews who called the book a "compelling version of an inspiring story." The reviewer also complimented "Grimard’s dramatic paintings," noting, "The sky colors are particularly effective."

CBC Books called Not My Girl "[a] poignant story of a determined young girl's struggle to belong, it will both move and inspire readers everywhere" and referred to Grimard's illustrations as "evocative."

Awards for Not My Girl
Year	Award	Result	Ref.
2015	Chocolate Lily Award	Shortlist	
2015	da Vinci Eye Award	Finalist	
2015	Information Book Award	Shortlist	
2015	Skipping Stones Book Award	Honor	
2015	Storytelling World Award	Honor	
