= Paws + Edward =

Children's Picture Book

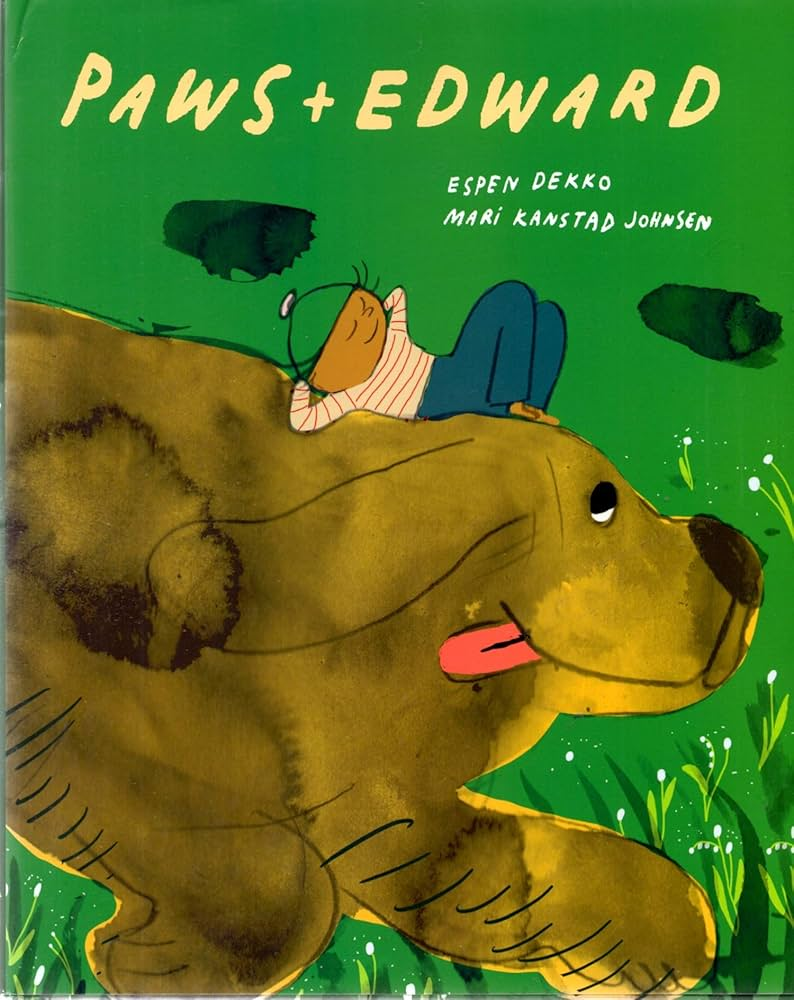
- Author: Espen Dekko
- Illustrator: Mari Kanstad Johnsen
- Language: Norwegian, English
- Genre: Children's Picture Book
- Published: 2017
- Publisher: Magikon forlag, Kids Can Press (English)
- Publication place: Norway
- English publication date: May 7, 2019
- ISBN: 978-1-525-30135-3

Paws + Edward is a children’s picture book written by Espen Dekko and illustrated by Mari Kanstad Johnsen. This book follows the perspective of Paws, an older dog, on a day with his owner, a child named Edward. At the end of the day, Paws passes away in his sleep, leaving a massive hole in Edward’s life, yet when Edward goes to sleep that night, he realizes that Paws is in a better place.

Originally published in Norway by the publishing house Magikon forlag under the title P + E, the book was translated to and published in English on May 9, 2019 by the Canadian publisher Kids Can Press. The book garnered some acclaim for its ability to help both children and adults process their grief over losing a pet to old age. Additionally, Paws + Edward won a spot on the USBBY’s Outstanding International Books list in 2020 and on Kirkus Reviews’ Best Picture Books of 2019.

== Plot ==
This book highlights the relationship between an older, massive, brown dog, named Paws, and his owner, a child named Edward. It begins with Paws in the middle of a nap, imagining his younger days when he could chase rabbits and squirrels. Edward sits on the couch next to him, reading, which Paws is grateful for, since he doesn’t have as much energy as he used to.

However, eventually Edward wants to go to the park. Paws wags his tail very slightly so that he can let Edward know that he is still happy to spend time with him. Paws quickly dozes off and dreams about rabbits again, when he gets woken up by Edward. Paws would rather stay inside, but he goes along so that Edward can get some valuable time outside.

The pace of the walk is very easy for Paws, and he even gets to take a break when Edward finds his friends. This rest is so nice that Paws forgets they are even on a walk before he has to be reminded by Edward. Eventually, they make it to the park, but Paws can’t hear or smell the usual features of the park, particularly the rabbits, despite them being abundant. Edward plays with a stick by himself, and eventually snuggles with Paws, much to the dog’s enjoyment.

When the duo gets home, exhaustion truly sets in for Paws. He lays in Edward’s bed, which reminds him of rabbit fur, and dreams even more. Edward eventually calls for him down the stairs, but Paws is enjoying his rest so much that he doesn’t feel like eating anything anymore. Paws acts like he doesn’t hear him so that he can continue to get more sleep and dream. Edward comes up the stairs, crying, and Paws licks his hand to comfort him. Paws eventually falls back asleep, but this time without any dreams.

Edward heads to the park again, now without his dog. The absence of Paws in his life is overwhelming, to the point where he can’t even read. At the park, Edward notices the same sounds, scents, and animals that were there every time he went with Paws. When he goes to sleep, he dreams of Paws, who is back to playing fetch, wagging his tail, and chasing rabbits.

== Themes ==
=== Death ===
In the illustrations of Paws + Edward, Paws constantly shows signs of aging, including being unable to sense rabbits in the park, despite them being clear in the pictures, and seeming exhausted as he has to be constantly woken up from his naps. According to School Library Journal's Betsy Bird, the book "shows an old pet at the end of its days, accepting what it can no longer do, dying in comfort and peace alongside someone who loves it”.

Paws + Edward also suggests death can be the start of a journey to even happier days. The pages between the cover and the first page show Paws and Edward when they were both younger, making happy memories together. Throughout the book, Paws wants to chase rabbits like in his younger days, but he can’t due to his age. However, in Edward’s dream after Paws’ death, Paws is again able to chase rabbits, just like he wanted to the entire time.

The book also shows how love can continue, even after death. Throughout the book, Paws takes up most of the page, representing how tremendous his role in Edward’s life is. After Paws's death, Edward continues to dream about him, showing readers that the feeling of love for an important figure in their lives is so powerful that it can never be taken away by monumental events, even death.

=== Pet-human relationships ===
Paws + Edward demonstrates a positive relationship between a pet and child. Many of the pictures show how exhausted Paws is, yet he looks happy and tries his best for Edward. Throughout the book, Edward views Paws with pure admiration, and despite being worn-out, Paws still spends time with Edward due to the love that his human gives him. Particularly, even though he doesn’t want to go outside at all, Paws convinces himself that he should because “Edward could use some fresh air,” showing how much he loves Edward. Kirkus Reviews described Paws and Edward as “inseparable.” The close bond is represented further by their dreams. At the end of the book, Edward dreams about spending another day with Paws, even though he has died, demonstrating Paws's impact on Edward's life.
