= Bookbird =

Journal of international children's literature (established 1957)

- Editor: Dr. Chrysogonus Siddha Malilang
- Frequency: 4 per year
- Founded: 1957
- Country: USA
- Based in: Baltimore
- Language: English
- Website: www.ibby.org/bookbird
- ISSN: 0006-7377

Bookbird: A Journal of International Children's Literature (ISSN 0006-7377) is the official refereed journal of the International Board on Books for Young People (IBBY). It is published quarterly and distributed by Johns Hopkins University Press.

== General information ==
Bookbird aims to communicate new ideas to the world-wide community of readers interested in children's books; it is open to any topic in the field of international children's literature. Each issue includes articles and information about children's literature from many countries. Regular features include peer-reviewed articles, shorter articles about children's books and their creators, interviews with authors and illustrators, reading promotion projects worldwide, and reviews of children's books and scholarly books from around the world.

Recent issues of Bookbird include articles on dual-language picturebooks, global rainbow families, children's literature in Russia, depictions of immigrant children in school settings, revolutionary children's literature in 1930s China, the portrayal of female genital mutilation in children's literature, and an examination of the social responsibility of bookmakers, readers and educators. The regular 'Focus IBBY' section highlights news of IBBY projects and events, and the 'Books on Books' section recently included reviews of texts from China, France, Japan, Poland, Scotland, and the USA. Issues of Bookbird vary between open issues and themed issues. Calls for manuscripts are posted on the IBBY website.

Every two years an issue of Bookbird is devoted to information about the illustrators and authors nominated for IBBY's Hans Christian Andersen Award. After the winners are announced, a subsequent issue carries articles about these, and also about the short-listed nominees. In a year when the biennial IBBY congress is held, an issue of Bookbird highlights the children's literature of the congress host country and region.

== History ==
The first issue of Bookbird was published in 1957 as a newsletter, by the founder of IBBY, Jella Lepman. The publication, Bookbird: A Flight Through Time (2021) recounts in words and pictures the story of Bookbird from its modest beginnings to an international journal with subscribers worldwide. Contributors include articles by or about those who have been involved with the story of Bookbird over some sixty years, providing insights into the development of children's literature in Europe and further afield. Photoessays include a history of the International Youth Library in Munich, which was the first home of Bookbird, and concludes with a photoessay about the work of IBBY and Bookbird in the twenty-first century.

== Publication ==
Bookbird is indexed by Scopus, Library Literature, LISA, Children's Book Review Index, Web of Science, and MLA International Bibliography. Bookbird is available by subscription in print and online through Johns Hopkins University Press, and individual articles are available online via Project Muse and ProQuest. Back issues from 1963 to 2013 are archived and free to access at Australian Literature Online. Bookbird, Inc. is registered in Indiana, USA as a not-for-profit corporation, and is managed by the Bookbird, Inc. Board.

== Sources ==
- Valerie Coghlan, Evelyn B. Freeman: Bookbird: A Flight Through Time. Bookbird, Inc. 2021. ISBN 9780578727257
