= Moa Backe Åstot =

Swedish Sámi author (born 1998)

- Born: 1998 (age 27–28); Malmberget, Sweden
- Occupation: Author
- Writing career
- Language: Swedish
- Years active: 2015–present
- Genre: Young adult literature
- Notable work: Himlabrand (2021)

Moa Backe Åstot (born 1998) is a Swedish Sámi author. She has written three young adult novels and several short stories, often addressing Sámi culture and identity. She has received accolades including the Norrlands litteraturpris and the Slangbellan, becoming the first Sámi author to win the latter.

Born in Malmberget, she began her literary career as a teenager. She studied writing at Umeå University and Jakobsberg Folk High School. Her debut novel, Himlabrand (2021), which follows a gay Sámi teenager navigating identity and first love, was nominated for the August Prize in the category of Children's and Youth Literature and for the Nordic Council Children and Young People's Literature Prize. It was translated into English as Fire From the Sky. Backe Åstot's second novel, Fjärilshjärta, also addresses Sámi identity; its English translation, Butterfly Heart, was nominated for a Kirkus Prize and named to the USBBY Outstanding International Books List. Her third novel Det är om dig jag skriver, was published in 2023 and also nominated for an August Prize.

== Life and career ==
Moa Backe Åstot was born in 1998 in Malmberget, Sweden, to a Sámi family. At the age of 17, while studying art at a gymnasium in Kiruna, she won the Lilla Erik Lindegrenpriset in 2015 for her short story "110 Lydia". It was subsequently published in the regional newspaper Norrländska Socialdemokraten. She then moved to Jokkmokk, her mother's hometown. In 2018, she won a Sveriges Radio short story competition for young people with "En liten röd droppe", about the experiences of a Sámi brother and sister during reindeer calf marking. She owns reindeer but is not a full-time reindeer herder. She studied writing at Umeå University and then continued her education at Jakobsberg Folk High School. She also took a Lule Sámi language course. She was involved in the development of Reality Check, a mobile game app launched in 2019 by the non-profit Teskedsorden to educate Swedish youth about racism. She wrote the storyline and script for the app's first Sámi character.

She made her debut as a young adult novelist in 2021 with Himlabrand, which was published by Rabén & Sjögren. The story follows Ánte, a 16-year-old Sámi boy and reindeer herder who fears the consequences of his homosexuality as he develops romantic feelings for his best friend, Erik. Although mostly in Swedish, the novel includes some untranslated Lule Sámi dialogue. In NORA: Nordic Journal of Feminist and Gender Research, Cathrine Bjerknes described it as "the first Scandinavian novel to thematize Sami gay male love". Similarly, Backe Åstot expressed in an interview with the Swedish LGBTQ magazine QX that it was likely the first young adult novel published in Sweden to feature a queer and Sámi main character. It received generally positive reviews from several literary critics. In Dagens Nyheter, Lydia Wistisen called it a "brilliant debut" (strålande debut) that captured both social realities of Sámi marginalisation as well as sincere feelings of first love. Johanna Lindbäck also praised it in Expressen, although she felt Ánte was not sufficiently developed as a main character. For Himlabrand, Backe Åstot became the first Sámi author to win the Slangbellan, a literary prize awarded annually by the Sveriges Författarförbund for debutants in children's and young adult literature. Other awards she received for her first novel include the Norrlands litteraturpris and the Studieförbundet Vuxenskolans författarpris, the latter shared with Patrik Lundberg. Himlabrand was nominated for the August Prize, in the category of Children's and Youth Literature. It was one of three Swedish-language books nominated for the Nordic Council Children and Young People's Literature Prize. It also received a Book of the Year nomination at the Gaygalan Awards. Eva Apelqvist translated it into English as Fire From the Sky, which was named a Printz Honour Book.

Backe Åstot's short story "Daughters" was published in May 2022 by Vogue Scandinavia, with accompanying illustrations by Sámi textile artist Britta Marakatt-Labba. She participated in a Sápmi Pride parade that August, the first such LGBTQ festival to be held in Gällivare. In 2023, Backe Åstot was one of four recipients of a Saami Council grant of 200,000 SEK. The same year, her second young adult novel, Fjärilshjärta, was published, about a girl named Vilda who loses a connection to her Sámi heritage after her grandfather's death. The novel explores questions about identity and belonging. Sydsvenskan journalist Shora Esmailian listed it as one of the year's best children's books. Translated by Agnes Broomé, Fjärilshjärta was released with the English title of Butterfly Heart and nominated for a Kirkus Prize in the young readers' category. It was also named to the USBBY Outstanding International Books List for children in grades 6–8.

Backe Åstot's third young adult novel, Det är om dig jag skriver, was published in 2026. It marked a departure from her previous works: it is a verse novel and not about Sámi culture. Set during the final semester before graduation at a rural school, the story explores a budding romance between two students of different social statuses but who share a creative interest. Bella Stenberg of Borås Tidning, who described it as more of a chronological sequence of poems rather than a novel, wrote that the format "[worked] surprisingly well". (Note: Swedish: funkar oväntat väl) Wistisen praised the second-person narrative and the lack of gender markers for the main characters, which she felt encouraged reader self-identification. While characterising the quality of the individual poems as uneven, she concluded the book's style made it a strong candidate for use in classrooms. Det är om dig jag skriver was nominated for the August Prize in the category of Children's and Youth Literature, Backe Åstot's second such nomination. In addition to writing young adult literature, she has advocated for youth literacy by participating in a Swedish Arts Council initiative. Speaking at the 2026 Littfest in Umeå, she emphasised the importance of listening to young people rather than having adults speculate about their reading preferences.

== Selected works ==
- Backe Åstot, Moa (2021). Himlabrand [Fire From the Sky] (in Swedish). Rabén & Sjögren. ISBN 9789129725575.
- — (2023). Fjärilshjärta [Butterfly Heart] (in Swedish). Rabén & Sjögren. ISBN 9789129741872.
- — (2026). Det är om dig jag skriver [You're the One I Write About] (in Swedish). Rabén & Sjögren. ISBN 9789129752403.
