= USBBY Outstanding International Books List =

American international books initiative

The USBBY Outstanding International Books List (The OIB List) is an initiative of the United States section of the International Board on Books for Young People (USBBY) to produce an annual list of the outstanding children's books from around the world.

== Background ==
The Outstanding International Books (OIB) list began in 2006. Each year, books are selected by a committee appointed from the membership of USBBY, the United States section of the International Board on Books for Young People (IBBY). The aim is to promote the best of international children's literature, to introduce young people to outstanding authors and illustrators from other countries, and to help children and young people in the United States to see the world from diverse perspectives.

== The 21st OIB List (2026) ==
A total of 41 titles from 24 countries were selected as “exceptional titles for children and young adults", reflecting themes of identity, hope, intergenerational bonds, friendship, play, curiosity, migration, nature, and cultural heritage.

Grades Pre-K–2

- Andruetto, María Teresa. Clara and the Man with Books in His Window. tr. from Spanish by Elisa Amado. illus. by Martina Trach. Greystone Kids (Argentina)
- Arai, Ryōji. The Snow Theater. tr. from Japanese by David Boyd. illus. by author. Enchanted Lion. (Japan)
- Atinuke. M Is for Mango. illus. by Angela Brooksbank. Candlewick Press. (UK/Nigeria)
- Auh, Dayeon. The Three-Year Tumble. tr. from German by Tim Mohr. illus. by author. NorthSouth Books. (Switzerland/South Korea)
- Xu, Bin. Picking Tea with Baba. tr. from Chinese by Shan Chen. illus. by Yu Yin. Charlesbridge. (China)
- Brandelius, Uje. The Playdate. tr. from Swedish by Nicola Smalley. illus. by Clara Dackenberg. Lantana. (Sweden)
- Flett, Julie. My Friend May. illus. by author. Greystone Kids. (Canada)
- Guarda, J. Maria. Paloma Flies Away. tr. from Spanish by Melanie Cordova. illus. by author. Candlewick Press. (Chile)
- Liu, Hao. Wrestlers of the Grasslands. tr. from Chinese by Clavis Press. illus. by author. Clavis Press. (China)
- Kim, Hye-Eun. Pencil. illus. by author. A Toon Book. (South Korea)
- Kim, Jihyun. Blue Sky Morning. tr. from Korean by Polly Lawson. illus. by author. Floris Books. (South Korea)
- Lam, Thao. Everybelly. illus. by author. Groundwood/House of Anansi. (Canada)
- Xiong, Liang. Take a Walk with the Wind. tr. from the Chinese by Chloe Garcia Roberts. illus. by author. Elsewhere Editions. (China)
- Lopez, Azul. Croco. tr. from the Spanish by Kit Maude. illus. by author. Tapioca Stories. (Mexico)
- Ohnari, Yuko. Downpour: Splish! Splash! Ker-Splash! tr. from Japanese by Emily Balistrieri. illus. by Koshiro Hata. Red Comet Press. (Japan)
- Perella, Eugenia. My Home Is In My Backpack. tr. from Spanish by Sally Polson. illus. by Angela Salerno. Floris Books. (Chile/Venezuela)
- Saunders, Kirli. Afloat. illus. by Freya Blackwood. Levine Querido. (Australia)
- Schuff, Nicolás. How to Reach the Moon. tr. from Spanish by Lawrence Schimel. illus. by Ana Sender. Amazon Crossing, Kids. (Argentina)
- Tallec, Olivier. Is It Asleep? tr. from French by Antony Shugaar. illus. by author. Gecko Press. (France)

Grades 3-5

- Dauremer, Rébecca. The Ordinary Life of Jacominus Gainsborough. tr. from French by Charis Ainslie. illus. by author.Post Wave. (France)
- Djupvik, Laura. My Brother. tr. from Norwegian by Martin Aitken. illus. by Øyvind Torseter. Elsewhere Editions. (Norway)
- Fadeeva, Olga. Sound: Discovering the Vibrations We Hear. tr. from Russian by Lena Traer. illus. by author. Eerdmans. (Russia)
- Kashiwaba, Sachiko. The Village Beyond the Mist. tr. from Japanese by Avery Fischer Udagawa. illus. by Miho Satake. Yonder/Restless Books. (Japan)
- Krishnaswami, Uma. The Sunshine Project. illus. by Julianna Swaney. Groundwood/House of Anansi. (Canada/India)
- McQuoid, Judith. Giant. Little Island. (Ireland/UK)
- Naïr, Karthika. Electric Birds of Pothakudi. illus. by Joëlle Jolivet. Abrams. (France/India)

Toro, Juliana Muñoz. Journey of the Humpbacks. tr. from Spanish by Lawrence Schimel. illus. by Dipacho. Eerdmans. (Colombia)

Grades 6-8

- Åstot, Moa Backe. Butterfly Heart. tr. from Swedish by Agnes Broomé. Levine Querido. (Sweden)
- Bjerkeland, Ingvild. Beasts. tr. from Norwegian by Rosie Hedger. Levine Querido. (Norway)
- Dzotap, Alain Serge. Adi of Boutanga: A Story from Cameroon. tr. from French by author. illus. by Marc Daniau. Eerdmans. (France/Cameroon)
- Go, Jung-Soon. Okchundang Candy. tr. from Korean by Aerin Park. illus. by author. Levine Querido. (South Korea)
- Lessore, Nathanael. Dropping Beats. Little, Brown.(UK)
- Mansour, Vivian. Pilgrim Codex. tr. from Spanish by Carlos Rodríguez Cortez. illus. by Emmanuel Valtierra. Levine Querido. (Mexico)
- Marsol, Manuel. Astro. tr. from Spanish by Lizzie Davis. illus. by author. Transit Books. (Spain)
- Rundberg, Johan. Biggest Fake in the Universe. tr. from Swedish by Eva Apelqvist. Amazon Crossing Kids. (Sweden)
- Said, SF. Tyger. illus. by Dave McKean.Penguin Workshop/Penguin Random House. (UK)

Grades 9-12

- Bassett, Louise. The Hidden Girl. Walker Books. (Australia)
- Magicdustė, Akvilė. The Bees: The Women Who Rocked Lithuania. tr. from Lithuanian by Erika Lastovskytė. illus. by author. Fantagraphics. (Lithuania)
- O’Brien. Gráinne. Solo. Little Island. (Ireland)
- Sanna, Alessandro. Old as Stone, Hard as Rock: Of Humans and War. tr. from Italian by Ammiel Alcalay. illus. by author. Unruly/Enchanted Lion. (Italy)
- Volbeda, Ludwig. Self Portrait. tr. from Dutch by Lucy Scott. illus. by author. Levine Querido.(The Netherlands)

== The 20th OIB List (2025) ==
A total of 40 titles from 23 different countries were selected.

Grades PreK–2

- A Day with Mousse by Claire Lebourg. tr. from French by Sophie Lewis. Transit Children’s Editions. (France)
- A Sleepless Night by Micaela Chirif. illus. by Joaquín Camp. tr. from Spanish by Jordan Landsman. Transit Children’s Editions. (Argentina)
- Amu Nowruz and His Violets by Hadi Mohammadi. illus. by Nooshin Safakhoo. tr. from Persian by Sara Khalili. Elsewhere Editions. (Iran)
- Boozhoo! Hello! by Mangeshig Pawis-Steckley. tr. from English to Anishinaabemowin by Mary Ann Corbiere. Groundwood Books. (Canada)
- Grandma’s Roof Garden by Tang Wei. tr. from Chinese by Kelly Zhang. Levine Querido. (China)
- Little Shrew by Akiko Miyakoshi. tr. from Japanese by KAISEI-SHA Publishing Co. and Kids Can Press. Kids Can Press. (Japan)
- Look! Look! by Uma Krishnaswami. illus. by Uma Krishnaswamy. Groundwood Books.(Canada/India)
- Marcelo, Martello, Marshmallow by Ruth Rocha. illus. by Ana Matsusaki. tr. from Portuguese by Tal Goldfajn. Tapioca Stories. (Brazil)
- Montezuma’s Tantrum by Nuria Gómez Benet. illus. by Santiago Solís Montes de Oca. tr. from Spanish by Elisa Amado. Aldana Libros/Greystone Books. (Spain/Mexico)
- ninitohtênân / We Listen by Caitlin Dale Nicholson with Leona Morin-Neilson tr. from English to Cree by Leona Morin-Neilson. Groundwood Books. (Canada)
- Taro Gomi’s Big Book of Words by Taro Gomi. tr. from Japanese by KAISEI-SHA Publishing Co, Taro Gomi, and Naomi Kirsten. Chronicle Books. (Japan)
- The Legend of Tiger and Tail-Flower by Lee Gee Eun. tr from Korean by Aerin Park. Levine Querido. (South Korea)
- The Slug and the Snail by Oein DeBhairduin. illus. by Olya Anima. Little Island. (Ireland)
- What Makes Us Human by Victor D.O. Santos. illus. by Anna Forlati. tr. from Portuguese by Victor D.O. Santos. Eerdmans Books for Young Readers. (Brazil)

Grades 3-5

- An Unexpected Light by José Saramago. illus. by Armando Fonseca. tr. from Portuguese by Margaret Jull Costa. Triangle Square Books/Seven Stories Press. (Portugal)
- Birds on the Brain by Uma Krishnaswami. illus. by Julianna Swaney. Groundwood Books. (Canada/India)
- Griso: The One and Only by Roger Mello. tr. from Portuguese by Daniel Hahn. Elsewhere Editions. (Brazil)
- John the Skeleton by Laan Triinu. illus. by Marja-Liisa Plats tr. from Estonian by Adam Cullen. Restless Books/Yonder. (Estonia)
- Loose Threads by Isol. tr. from Spanish by Lawrence Schimel. Enchanted Lion. (Argentina)
- Mishka by Edward van de Vendel, & Anoush Elman. illus. by Annet Schaap.tr. from Dutch by Nancy Forest-Flier. Levine Querido. (Netherlands)
- Taming Papa by Mylène Goupil. tr. from French by Shelley Tanaka. Groundwood Books. (Canada)
- The Duel: A Story about Peace by Inês Viegas Oliveira. tr. from Portuguese by Rosa Churcher Clarke. Triangle Square Books/Seven Stories Press. (Portugal)
- The Wildcat Behind Glass by Alki Zei. tr. from Greek by Karen Emmerich. Restless Books/Yonder. (Greece)
- Too Small Tola Makes It Count by Atinuke. illus. by Onyinye Iwu. Candlewick. (United Kingdom/Nigeria)
- Water: Discovering the Precious Resource All Around Us by Olga Fadeeva. tr. from Russian by Lena Traer. Eerdmans Books for Young Readers. (Russia)
- Vigdís: A Book About the World’s First Female President by Rán Flygenring. tr. from Icelandic by Jonas Moody. HELVETIQ. (Iceland)

Grades 6-8

- Call Me Al by Wali Shah & Eric Walters. Orca Books. (Canada)
- Island of Whispers by Frances Hardinge. illus. by Emily Gravett. Amulet/Abrams Books. (United Kingdom)
- Johnny, the Sea, and Me by Melba Escobar. illus. by Elizabeth Builes. Melba. tr. from Spanish by Sara Lissa Paulson. Enchanted Lion. (Colombia)
- Our Beautiful Darkness by Ondjaki. illus. by António Jorge Gonçalves. tr. from Portuguese by Lyn Miller-Lachmann. Unruly/Enchanted Lion. (Brazil/Angola)
- Save Our Forest! by Nora Dåsnes. tr. from Norwegian by Lise Lærdal Bryn. Hippo Park/Astra Books for Young Readers. (Norway)
- The Go-Between by Jennifer Maruno. Red Deer Press. (Canada)
- The Mailbox Tree by Rebecca Lim & Kate Gordon. Walker Books. (Australia)
- The Queen of Thieves: The Moonwind Mysteries by Johan Rundberg. tr. from Swedish by A. A. Prime. Amazon Crossing Kids. (Sweden)
- We Go to the Park by Sara Stridsberg. illus. by Beatrice Alemagna. tr. from Swedish by B.J. Woodstein. Unruly/Enchanted Lion. (Sweden)
- Wildful by Kengo Kurimoto. Groundwood Books. (Canada)

Grades 9-12 ● Crash Landing by Li Charmaine Anne. Annick Press. (Canada) ● Loud: Stories to Make Your Voice Heard by Anna Cercignano, Elenora Antonioni, Maurizia Rubino, Francesca Torre, La Tram, Lucia Biagi, Vega Guerrieri, Caterina Ferrante, Laure Guglielmo, Davide Costa, ElisA2B, Carmen Guasco, Marta Macolino, & Alessia De Sio. tr. from Italian by Anna Barton. Dark Horse Comics. (Italy) ● The Book of Denial by Ricardo Chávez Castañeda. illus. by Alejandro Magallanes. tr. from Spanish by Lawrence Schimel. Unruly/Enchanted Lion. (Mexico) ● Ukraine: Remember Also Me: Testimonies from the War by George Butler. Candlewick Studio. (United Kingdom/Ukraine)

== The 19th OIB List (2024) ==
A total of 41 books were selected. 29 of the titles were translated into English, 27 different countries or cultures are represented in the selections. The chair of the selection committee noted that "the authors and illustrators empower readers to make sense of themselves, make sense of the world at large, and to recognize change is always possible."

Grades PreK–2

- Aguilera, Claudio. 9 Kilometers. Tr. from Spanish by Lawrence Schimel. Illus. by Gabriela Lyon. Eerdmans Books for Young Readers. (Chile)
- Álvarez, David & David Bowles. Ancient Night. Illus. by David Álvarez. Levine Querido. (Mexico)
- Dalvand, Reza. I Have the Right: An Affirmation of the United Nations Convention on the Rights of the Child. Tr. from French by Scribble. Illus. by author. Scribble. (France)
- Fadeeva, Olga Fadeeva. Wind: Discovering Air in Motion. Tr. from Russian by Lena Traer. Illus. by author. Eerdmans. (Russia)
- Fontenaille, Élise. At the Drop of a Cat. Tr. from French by Karin Snelson and Emile Robert Wong. Illus. by Violeta Lópiz. Enchanted Lion Books. (France)
- Gombač, Žiga X. Adam and His Tuba. Tr. from Slovenian by Olivia Hellewell. Illus. by Maja Kastelic. North South Books. (Slovenia/Switzerland)
- Herreros, Ana Cristina. The Amazing and True Story of Tooth Mouse Pérez. Tr. from Spanish by Sara Lissa Paulson. Illus. by Violeta Lópiz. Enchanted Lion Books. (Spain)
- Lee, Suzy. The Shade Tree. Tr. from Korean by Helen Mixter. Illus. by author. Greystone Books. (South Korea)
- Maijala, Marika. Rosie Runs. Tr. from Finnish by Mia Spangenberg. Illus. by author. Elsewhere Editions. (Finland)
- Narayanan, Priya. Friend of Numbers: The Life of Mathematician Srinivasa Ramanujan. Illus by Satwik Gade. Eerdmans Books for Young Readers. (India)
- Rodari, Gianni. A Daydreamy Child Takes a Walk. Tr. from Italian by Antony Shugaar. Illus. by Beatrice Alemagna. Enchanted Lion Books. (Italy)
- Rodríguez, Nelson and Leonardo Agustín Montes. Colorful Mondays: A Bookmobile Spreads Hope in Honduras. Tr. from Spanish by Lawrence Schimel. Illus. by Rosana Faría and Carla Tabora. Eerdmans Books for Young Readers. (Honduras/Spain)
- Schneider, Noemi. Ludwig and the Rhinoceros: A Philosophical Bedtime Story. Tr. from German by Marshall Yarbrough. Illus. by Golden Cosmos. North South Books. (Switzerland)
- Shatokhin, Oleksandr. Yellow Butterfly: A Story from Ukraine. Illus. by author. Red Comet Press. (Ukraine)
- Vasco, Irene. The Young Teacher and the Great Serpent. Tr. from Spanish by Lawrence Schimel. Illus. by Juan Palomino. Eerdmans Books for Young Readers. (Colombia/Spain)
- Yomoto, Kazumi. The Bear and the Wildcat. Tr. from Japanese by Cathy Hirano. Illus. by Komako Sakai. Gecko Press. (Japan)

Grades 3–5

- Anisimova, Anna. The Invisible Elephant. Tr. from Russian by Ruth Ahmedzai Kemp. Illus. by Yulia Sidneva. Yonder: Restless Books for Young Readers. (Russia)
- Chang-hoon, Jung. The Moon Tonight: Our Moon’s Journey Around Earth. Tr. from Korean by Paige Morris. Illus. by Jang Ho. Blue Dot Kids Press. (South Korea)
- Colfer, Eoin. Three Tasks for a Dragon. Illus. by P. J. Lynch. Candlewick Press. (Ireland)
- Desnitskaya, Anna. On the Edge of the World. Tr. from Russian by Lena Traer. Illus. by author. Eerdmans Books for Young Readers. (Russia)
- Franck, Ed. The Moon is a Ball: Stories of Panda & Squirrel. Tr. from Dutch by David Colmer. Illus. by Thé Tjong-Khing. Gecko Press. (Belgium)
- Friedland, Aaron and Ndileka Mandela. The Walking School Bus. Illus. by Andrew Jackson Obol. Greystone Kids. (South Africa/Canada)
- Hillström, Ylva. The Art and Life of Hilma af Klint. Tr. from Swedish by B.J. Epstein. Illus. by Karin Eklund. Thames & Hudson. (Sweden)
- Kashiwaba, Sachiko. The House of the Lost on the Cape. Tr. from Japanese by Avery Fischer Udagawa. Illus. by Yukiko Fontini. Yonder: Restless Books for Young Readers. (Japan)
- Marcinkevičius, Marius. The Pebble: An Allegory of the Holocaust. Tr. from Lithuanian by Jūra Avižienis. Illus. by Inga Dagilė. Thames & Hudson. (Lithuania)
- Nguyen, Trang and Jeet Zdung. Saving H'non: Chang and the Elephant. Tr. from Vietnamese by authors. Illus. by Jeet Zdung. Dial Books. (Vietnam)
- Prokhasko, Taras and Marjana Prokhasko. Who Will Make the Snow? Tr. from Ukrainian by Boris Dralyuk and Jennifer Croft. Illus. by Marjana Prokhasko. Elsewhere Editions. (Ukraine)
- Vasco, Irene. Letters in Charcoal. Tr. from Spanish by Lawrence Schimel. Illus. by Juan Palomino. Lantana Publishing. (Colombia)
- Zarif, Marya. Dounia and the Magic Seeds. Tr. from French by Yvette Ghione. Illus. by author. OwlKids Books. (Syria/Canada)
- Zo-O. Corner. Tr. from Korean by Ellen Jang. Illus. by author. Owlkids Books. (South Korea)

Grades 6–8

- Bushby, Aisha. Pocketful of Stars. Carolrhoda Books. (Kuwait/United Kingdom)
- John-Kehewin, Wanda. Hopeless in Hope. Highwater Press. (Cree/Canada)
- Mitchell, Jane. Run for Your Life. Little Island. (Ireland)
- Phạm, Thọ and Sandra McTavish. The Cricket War. Kids Can Press. (Vietnam/Canada)
- Rundberg, Johan. The Night Raven. Tr. from Swedish by A.A. Prime. Amazon Crossing Kids. (Sweden)
- Saleh, Haya. Wild Poppies. Tr. from Arabic by Marcia Lynx Qualey. Levine Querido. (Jordan)

Grades 9–12

- Estrela, Joana. Pardalita. Tr. from Portuguese by Lyn-Miller Lachmann. Illus. by author. Levine Querido. (Portugal)
- Higa, Susumu. Okinawa. Tr. from Japanese by Jocelyne Allen. Illus. by author. Fantagraphics. (Japan)
- Kumagai, Clara. Catfish Rolling. Penguin Random House. (Japan/Canada)
- Sullivan, Deirdre. Savage Her Reply. Little Island. (Ireland)
- Wein, Elizabeth. Stateless. Tundra/Penguin Random House. (United Kingdom/Canada)

== The 18th OIB List (2023) ==
A total of 40 books were selected. 21 of the titles were translated into English, 26 different countries or cultures are represented in the selections.

GRADES PreK–2

- Howden, Sarah. The Tunnel. Illus. by Erika Rodriguez Medina. Owlkids. (Canada)
- Jihyun, Kim. The Depth of the Lake and the Height of the Sky. Trans. from Korean by S.B. Rights Agency. Illus. by author. Floris Books. (South Korea)
- Lee, Gee-Eun. My GrandMom. Trans. from Korean by Sophie Bowman. Illus. by author. Amazon Crossing Kids. (South Korea)
- Mahiout, Anouk. A Place for Pauline. Trans. from French by Groundwood. Illus. by Marjolaine Perreten. Groundwood Books. (Canada)
- Moahloli, Refiloe. I am You: A Book about Ubuntu. Illus. by Zinelda McDonald. Amazon Crossing Kids. (South Africa)
- Nainy, Mamta. Rainbow Hands. Illus. by Jo Loring-Fisher. Lantana. (India/United Kingdom)
- Parappukkaran, Sandhya. The Boy Who Tried to Shrink His Name. Illus. by Michelle Pereira. Abrams Books for Young Readers. (Australia)
- Ray, Achintyarup. Jhupli’s Honey Box. Trans. from Bengali by author. Illus. by Shivam Choudhary. Tulika Publishers. (India)
- Rodari, Gianni. Telling Stories Wrong. Trans. from Italian by Antony Shugaar. Illus. by Beatrice Alemagna. Enchanted Lion Books. (Italy)
- Skomsvold, Kjersti Annesdatter. Bedtime for Bo. Trans. from Norwegian by Kari Dickson. Illus. by Mari Kanstad Johnsen. Enchanted Lion Books. (Norway)
- Togo, Narisa. When the Sakura Bloom. Trans. from Japanese by Michael Sedunary. Berbay Publishing. (Japan)
- Yage, Wang. Playing with Lanterns. Trans. from Simplified Chinese by Helen Wang. Illus. by Zhu Chengliang. Amazon Crossing Kids. (China)

GRADES 3–5

- Atinuke. Too Small Tola and the Three Fine Girls. Illus. by Onyinye Iwu. Candlewick. (Nigeria)
- Ávila, Pilar López. With a Butterfly’s Wings. Trans. from Spanish by Jon Brokenbrow. Illus. by Zuzanna Celej. Cuento de Luz. (Spain)
- Dumas, William. The Gift of the Little People. Illus. by Rhian Brynjolson. HighWater Press. (Rocky Cree/Canada)
- Earle, Phil. When the Sky Falls. Bloomsbury Children’s Books. (England)
- Guridi, Raúl Nieto. it's so difficult. Trans. from Spanish by Lawrence Schimel. Illus. by author. Eerdmans Books for Young Readers. (Spain)
- Montañés, Mónica. Different: A Story of the Spanish Civil War. Trans. from Spanish by Lawrence Schimel. Illus. by Eva Sánchez Gómez. Eerdmans Books for Young Readers. (Spain)
- Mountford, Karl James. The Circles in the Sky. Illus. by author. Candlewick Studio. (UK)
- Oziewicz, Tina. What Feelings Do When No One's Looking. Trans. from Polish by Jennifer Croft. Illus. by Aleksandra Zając. elsewhere editions. (Poland)
- Sardà, Júlia. The Queen in the Cave Illus. by author. Candlewick Press. (United Kingdom)
- Stridsberg, Sara. The Summer of Diving. Trans. from Swedish by B. J. Woodstein. Illus. by Sara Lundberg. Seven Stories Press/Triangle Square Books for Young Readers. (Sweden)
- Sunar, Özge Bahar. My Grandma’s Photos. Illus. By Senta Urgan. trans. by Amy Marie Spangler. Amazon Crossing Kids. (Turkey)
- Thompson, Sam. Wolfstongue. Illus. by Anna Tromop. Little Island Books. (Ireland)
- White, Paula. The Baker by the Sea. Illus. by author. Templar Books. (England)
- Widmark, Martin. Dreams of Near and Far. Trans. from Swedish by Polly Lawson. Illus. by Emilia Dziubak. Floris Books. (Sweden)
- Wright, Felicity. A Kunwinjku Counting Book. Illus. by Gabriel Maralngurra. Enchanted Lion Books. (Bininj/Australia)

GRADES 6–8

- Cley, Amanda. The Pack. Trans. from Italian by Eerdmans Books for Young Readers. Illus. by Cecilia Ferri. Eerdmans Books for Young Readers. (Italy)
- Giménez, Regina. Geo-graphics. Trans. from Catalan by Alexis Romay and Valerie Block. Illus. by author. Levine Querido. (Spain)
- Nannestad, Katrina. We Are Wolves. Illus. by Martina Heiduczek. Atheneum. (Prussia/Australia)
- Neruda, Pablo. Book of Questions: Selections/Libros de las preguntas: Selecciones. Trans. from Spanish by Sara Lissa Paulson. Illus. by Paloma Valdivia. Enchanted Lion Books. (Chile)
- Newman, Carey & Kirstie Hudson. The Witness Blanket: Truth, Art and Reconciliation. Orca Book Publishers. (Canada)
- Richardson, Bill. Last Week. Illus. by Emilie Leduc. Groundwood Books. (Canada)
- Spencer, Kim. Weird Rules to Follow. Orca Book Publishers. (Ts’msyen Nation/Canada)
- Wolo, Mamle. The Kaya Girl. Little, Brown and Company. (Ghana)

GRADES 9–12

- Canizales. Amazona. Trans. from Spanish by Sofía Huitrón Martínez. Illus. by author. Lerner/Graphic Universe. (Columbia)
- Conyngham, Richard. All Rise: Resistance and Rebellion in South Africa 1910 – 1948 – A Graphic History. Illus. by Saaid Rahbeeni, The Trantraal Brothers, Liz Clarke, Dada Khanyisa, Tumi Mamabolo, & Mark Modimola. Catalyst Press. (South Africa)
- Martins, Vitor. This is Our Place. Trans. from Brazilian Portuguese by Larissa Helena. Scholastic/PUSH. (Brazil).
- Miyazaki, Hayao. Shuna’s Journey. Trans. from Japanese by Alex Dudok de Wit. Illus. by the author. FirstSecond. (Japan)
- Van Rijckeghem, Jean-Claude. Ironhead or, Once a Young Lady. Trans. from French by Kristen Gehrman. Levine Querido. (Belgium)

== The 17th OIB List (2022) ==
A total of 42 books were selected. 18 of the titles were translated into English, 24 countries or cultures are represented in the selections.

GRADES PreK–2

- Atinuke. Too Small Tola. Illus. by Onyinye Iwu. Candlewick Press. (Nigeria)
- Baek, Heena. Moon Pops. Trans. from Korean by Jieun Kiaer. Illus. by author. Owlkids Books. (South Korea)
- Flett, Julie. We All Play/ Kimêtawânaw. Trans. by The Cree Literacy Network. Illus. by author. Greystone Kids. (Canada)
- Kontoleon, Anna and Kontoleon, Manos. Comings and Goings. Illus. by Fontini Tikkou. Star Bright Books. (Greece)
- Lam, Thao. Thao. Illus. by author. Owlkids Books. (Vietnam/Canada)
- Larsen, Marit. Agnes’s Place. Trans. from Norwegian by Kari Dickson. Illus. by Jenny Løvlie. Amazon Crossing Kids. (Norway)
- Luby, Brittany. Mii Maanda Ezhi-Gkendmaanh: This Is How I Know. Trans. from Anishinaabemowin by Alvin Ted Corbiere and Alan Corbiere. Illus. by Joshua Mangeshig Pawis-Steckley. Groundwood Books. (Canada: Anishinaabewaking)
- Morgan, Sally. Little Bird's Day. Illus. by Johnny Warrkatja Malibirr. Blue Dot Kids Press. (Australia)
- Motum, Markus. Ducks Overboard! A True Story of Plastic in Our Oceans. Illus. by author. Candlewick Press. (UK: England)
- Pearson, Debora. My Words Flew Away Like Birds. Illus. by Shrija Jain. Kids Can Press. (Canada)
- Perrin, Clotilde. Inside the Suitcase. Trans. from French by Daniel Hahn. Illus. by author. Gecko Press. (France)
- Robert, Nadine. On the Other Side of the Forest. Trans. from French by Paula Ayer. Illus. by Gérard Dubois. Greystone Kids. (Canada)
- Soundar, Chitra. Sona Sharma, Very Best Big Sister? Illus. by Jen Khatun. Candlewick Press. (India)

GRADES 3–5

- Abery, Julie. Sakamoto’s Swim Club: How a Teacher Led an Unlikely Team to Victory. Illus. by Chris Sasaki. Kids Can Press. (Canada)
- Ahn, Angela. Peter Lee's Notes from the Field. Illus. by Julie Kwon. Tundra Books. (Canada)
- Atinuke. Africa, Amazing Africa: Country by Country. Illus. by Mouni Feddag. Candlewick Press. (African Continent)
- Birkjær, Betina. Coffee, Rabbit, Snowdrop, Lost. Trans. from Danish by Sinéad Quirke Køngerskov. Illus. by Anna Margrethe Kjærgaard. Enchanted Lion. (Denmark)
- Böge, Dieter. 189 Canaries. Trans. from German by Laura Watkinson. Illus. by Elsa Klever. Eerdmans Books For Young Readers. (Germany)
- Boivin, Lisa. We Dream Medicine Dreams. Illus. by author. Highwater Press. (Canada: Northwest Territories)
- Buitrago, Jairo. Wounded Falcons. Trans. from Spanish by Elisa Amado. Illus. by Rafael Yockteng. Groundwood Books. (Mexico)
- Carmona, Hannah. Anita and the Dragons. Illus. by Anna Cunha. Lantana. (Dominican Republic)
- Fried, Hédi. The Story of Bodri. Trans. from Swedish by Linda Schenck. Illus. by Stina Wirsén. Eerdmans Books For Young Readers. (Sweden)
- Fontaine, Valérie. The Big Bad Wolf in my House. Trans. from French by Shelley Tanaka. Illus. by Nathalie Dion. Groundwood Books. (Canada)
- Hrab, Naseem. The Sour Cherry Tree. Illus. by Nahid Kazemi. Owlkids Books. (Canada)
- Manrique, María Eugenia. The Caiman. Trans. From Spanish by Amy Brill. Illus. by Ramón París. Amazon Crossing Kids. (Venezuela)
- Morstad, Julie. Time is a Flower. Illus. by author. Tundra Books. (Canada)
- Pang, Hannah. Seasons: A Year in Nature. Illus. by Clover Robin. Tiger Tales/360 Degrees. (UK)
- Raúf, Onjali Q. The Star Outside my Window. Illus. by Pippa Curnick. Delacorte Press. (UK: England)
- Osada, Hiroshi. Almost Nothing, yet Everything: A Book about Water. Trans. from Japanese by David Boyd. Illus. by Ryōji Arai. Enchanted Lion. (Japan)
- Waters, Fiona. Tiger, Tiger, Burning Bright! An Animal Poem for Each Day of the Year. Illus. by Britta Teckentrup. Candlewick Press/Nosy Crow. (UK)

GRADES 6–8

- Cheng, Eugenia. Molly and the Mathematical Mysteries: Ten Interactive Adventures in Mathematical Wonderland. Illus. by Aleksandra Artymowska. Candlewick Press/Big Picture Press. (UK)
- Fung, Rosena. Living with Viola. Illus. by author. Annick Press. (Canada)
- Kuzki, Shaw. Soul Lanterns. Trans. from Japanese by Emily Balistrieri. Delacorte Press. (Japan)
- Mckay, Hilary. The Swallows’ Flight. Simon & Schuster/Margaret K. McElderry Books. (England/Germany)
- Poulin, Andrée. Burying the Moon. Illus. by Sonali Zohra. Groundwood Books. (India)
- Romanyshyn, Romana and Lesiv, Andriy. How War Changed Rondo. Trans. from Ukrainian by Oksana Lushchevska. Illus. by authors. Enchanted Lion. (Ukraine)

GRADES 9–12

- Aisato, Lisa. All the Colors of Life. Trans. from Norwegian by Olivia Lasky. Illus. by author. W1-Media/Arctis Books. (Norway).
- Boulerice, Simon. Carry On: Poetry by Young Immigrants. Trans. from French by Susan Ouriou. Illus. by Rogé. Owlkids Books. (Canada)
- Chim, Wai. Freedom Swimmer. Scholastic Press. (China)
- Kessler, Liz. When the World Was Ours. Simon & Schuster/Aladdin. (Austria/Poland/England)
- Kinew, Wab. Walking in Two Worlds. Penguin Teens. (Canada)
- Letria, José Jorge. War. Trans. from Portuguese by Elisa Amado. Illus. by André Letria. Greystone Kids. (Portugal)

== The 16th OIB List (2021) ==
A total of 42 books were selected.

GRADES PreK–2

- Ahmed, Sufiya. Under the Great Plum Tree. Illus. by Reza Dalvand. Tiny Owl. (UK)
- Atinuke. Catch that Chicken! Illus. by Angela Brooksbank. Candlewick.(UK/Set in West Africa)
- Berry, James. A Story About Afiya. Illus. by Anna Cunha. Lantana. (UK)
- Cotter, Sacha. Cannonball. Illus. by Josh Morgan. Sourcebooks/Sourcebooks Jabberwocky. (New Zealand)
- David, Gauthier. Letters from Bear. Trans. from French by Sarah Ardizzone. Illus by Marie Caudry. Eerdmans Books for Young Readers. (Belgium)
- Frankel, Yael. The Elevator. Trans. from Spanish by Kit Maude. Tapioca Stories. (Argentina)
- Hrab, Naseem. Weekend Dad. Illus. by Frank Viva. Groundwood. (Canada)
- Júnior, Otávio. From My Window. Trans. from Portuguese by Beatriz C. Dias. Illus. by Vanina Starkoff. Barefoot Books. (Brazil)
- Maclear, Kyo. Story Boat. Illus. by Rashin Kheiriyeh. Tundra. (Canada)
- Stinson, Kathy. The Lady with the Books: A Story Inspired by the Remarkable Work of Jella Lepman. Illus. by Marie Lafrance. Kids Can Press. (Canada)
- Van de Vendel, Edward. Little Fox. Trans. from Dutch by David Colmer. Illus. by Marije Tolman. Levine Querido/Em Querido. (Netherlands)
- Weightman, Magnus. All Along the River. Trans. from Dutch by author. Illus. by author. Clavis Publishing. (Belgium)
- Wernicke, María. Some Days. Trans. from Spanish by Lawrence Schimel. Illus. by author. Amazon Crossing Kids. (Argentina)
- Yoshitake, Shinsuke. There Must Be More Than That! Ed. by Naomi Kirsten from translation. Illus. by author. Chronicle Books. (Japan)

GRADES 3–5

- Almond, David. War is Over. Illus. by David Litchfield. Candlewick. (UK)
- Ferrada, María José. Mexique: A Refugee Story from the Spanish Civil War. Trans. from Spanish by Elisa Amado. Illus. by Ana Penyas. Eerdmans Books For Young Readers. (Mexico)
- Järvinen, Aino. 1,001 Creatures. Trans. from Finnish by Emily Jeremiah. Illus. by Laura Merz. Restless Books. (Finland)
- Krone, Bridget. Small Mercies. Illus. by Karen Vermeulen. Catalyst Press. (South Africa)
- Lam, Thao. The Paper Boat: A Refugee Story. Illus. by author. Owlkids Books. (Canada/Vietnam)
- McKay, Hilary. The Time of Green Magic. Simon & Schuster/McElderry Books. (UK)
- McLachlan, Jenny. The Land of Roar. Illus. by Ben Mantle. HarperCollins/Harper. (UK)
- Mian, Zanib. Planet Omar: Accidental Trouble Magnet. Illus. by Nasaya Mafaridik. Penguin/G.P. Putnam's Sons. (UK)
- Nilsson, Ulf. All the Dear Little Animals. Trans. from Swedish by Julia Marshall. Illus. by Eva Eriksson. Gecko Press. (Sweden)
- Romanyshyn, Romana & Lesiv, Andriy. Sound: Shhh...Bang...POP... BOOM! Trans. from Ukrainian by Vitaly Chernetsky. Illus. by authors. Chronicle/Handprint. (Ukraine)
- Roskifte, Kristin. Everybody Counts: A Counting Story from 0 to 7.5 Billion. Trans.from Norwegian by Siân Mackie. Illus. by author. The Quarto Group/ Wide Eyed Editions. (Norway)
- Utkin, Alexander. Gamayun Tales I. Trans. from Russian by Lada Morozova. Illus. by author. Nobrow. (UK/Russia)
- Yabouza, Adrienne. The Magic Doll: A Children’s Book Inspired by African Art. Trans. from French by Paul Kelly. Illus. by Élodie Nouhen. Prestel. (France/set in Central African Republic)

GRADES 6–8

- Aung Thin, Michelle. Crossing the Farak River. Annick Press. (Australia/set in Myanmar)
- Billet, Julia. Catherine’s War. Trans. from French by Ivanka Hahnenberger. Illus. by Claire Fauvel. HarperCollins/HarperAlley. (France)
- Fagan, Cary. Maurice and His Dictionary: A True Story. Illus. by Enzo Lord Mariano. Owlkids Books. (Canada)
- Kadarusman, Michelle. Music for Tigers. Pajama Press. (Canada/set in Australia)
- Pêgo, Ana & Martins, Isabel Minhós. Plasticus Maritimus: An Invasive Species. Trans. from Portuguese by Jane Springer. Illus. by Bernardo P. Carvalho. Greystone Books/Greystone Kids in partnership with the David Suzuki Institute. (Portugal)
- Robertson, David A. The Barren Grounds. Illus. by Natasha Donovan. Penguin Random House Canada Young Readers/Puffin. (Canada)
- Van den Ende, Peter. The Wanderer. Illus. by author. Levine Querido/Em Querido. (Netherlands)
- Watanabe, Issa. Migrants. Illus. by author. Gecko Press. (Mexico)

GRADES 9–12

- Bhathena, Tanaz. Hunted by the Sky. Macmillan/Farrar Straus Giroux.(Canada)
- Cuthew, Lucy. Blood Moon. Candlewick/Walker. (UK)
- Hardinge, Frances. Deeplight. Abrams/Amulet. (UK)
- Kaito. Blue Flag, Vol. 1. Trans. from Japanese by Adrienne Beck. Illus. by author. VIZ Media. (Japan)
- Thakur, Sophia. Somebody Give This Heart a Pen. Candlewick/Walker. (UK)
- Yu, Zhiying. The Ode to the Goddess of the Luo River. Adapted and trans. from Chinese by author. Illus. by Ye Luying. minedition. (China)

== The 15th OIB List (2020) ==
A total of 42 books were selected.

GRADES PreK-2

- Abadia, Ximo. The Farmer. Trans. by Grace Maccarone & Kelly Loughman. Illus. by the author. Holiday House Publishing. (Switzerland)
- Avingaq, Susan & Vsetula, Maren. The Pencil. Illus. by Charlene Chua. Inhabit Media. (Canada)
- Basil, Krystia. A Sky Without Lines. Illus. by Laura Borràs. minedition. (Hong Kong/set along US/Mexico border)
- Chernysheva, Natalia. The Return. Illus. by the author. Groundwood Books. (Portugal)
- Dekko, Espen. Paws+Edward. Trans. by Kids Can Press. Illus. by Mari Kanstad Johnsen. Kids Can Press. (Norway)
- Flett, Julie. Birdsong. Illus. by the author. Greystone Kids. (Canada)
- Iglesias, Juan Pablo. Daniel and Ismail. Trans. by Ilan Stavans, Eliezer Nowodworski, Frieda Press-Danieli, and Randa Sayegh. Illus. by Alex Peris. Yonder. (Chile)
- Lee, Hyeon-Ju. The Happiest Tree: A Story of Growing Up. llus. by the author. Feiwel and Friends. (Korea)
- Meddour, Wendy. Lubna and Pebble. Illus. by Daniel Egnéus. Dial Books for Young Readers. (UK)
- Ram, Praba & Preuitt, Sheela. Thukpa for All. Illus. by Shilpa Ranade. Karadi Tales Company. (India)
- Read, Kate. One Fox: A Counting Book Thriller. Illus. by the author. Peachtree Publishing Company. (UK)
- Tanco, Miguel. Count on Me. Illus. by the author. Tundra Books. (Canada)
- Vermette, Katherena. The Girl and the Wolf. Illus. by Julie Flett. Theytus Books. (Canada)
- Vilela, Fernando. Along the Tapajós. Trans. by Daniel Hahn. Illus. by the author. Amazon Crossing Kids. (Brazil)
- Yoshitake, Shinsuke. The Boring Book. Ed. by Naomi Kirsten from translation. Illus. by the author. Chronicle Books. (Japan)

GRADES 3-5

- Abela, Deborah. The Most Marvelous International Spelling Bee. Sourcebooks Jabberwocky. (Australia)
- Alvarez, Lorena. Hicotea: A Nightlights Story. Illus. by the author. Nobrow. (UK)
- Blackcrane, Gerelchimeg. The Moose of Ewenki. Trans. by Helen Mixter. Illus. by Jiu Er. Greystone Kids. (China)
- Dahle, Gro. Angryman. Trans. by Tara Chace. Illus by Svein Nyhus. NorthSouth Books. (Norway)
- Huson, Brett D. The Grizzly Mother. Illus. by Natasha Donovan. HighWater Press. (Canada)
- Hutchinson, Michael. The Case of Windy Lake. Second Story Press. (Canada)
- Ørbeck-Nilssen, Constance. Vanishing Colors. Trans. by Kari Dickson. Illus. by Akin Duzakin. Eerdmans Books for Young Readers. (Norway)
- Rundell, Katherine. The Good Thieves. Simon & Schuster Books for Young Readers. (UK/set in US)
- Smith, Heather. The Phone Booth in Mr. Hirota’s Garden. Illus.by Rachel Wada. Orca Book Publishers. (Canada/set in Japan)
- Taylor, Sean & the Khayaal Theatre. Riding a Donkey Backwards: Wise and Foolish Tales of Mulla Nasruddin. Illus. by Shirin Adl. Candlewick Press. (UK)
- Vafaeian, Marjan. The Parrot and the Merchant: A Tale by Rumi. Trans. by Azita Rassi. Illus. by the author. Tiny Owl Publishing. (Iran)

GRADES 6-8

- Argueta, Jorge. Caravan to the North: Misael’s Long Walk. Trans. by Elizabeth Bell. Illus. by Manuel Monroy. Groundwood Books. (Canada/set in Central America)
- Gourlay, Candy. Bone Talk. Scholastic. (UK/set in the Philippines)
- Kadarusman, Michelle. Girl of the Southern Sea. Pajama Press. (Canada/set in Indonesia)
- Litvina, Alexandra. The Apartment: A Century of Russian History. Trans. by Antonina W. Bouis. Illus. by Anna Desnitskaya. Abrams Books for Young Readers. (Russia)
- Mello, Roger. Charcoal Boys. Trans. by Daniel Hahn. Illus. by the author. Elsewhere Editions. (Brazil)
- Polak, Monique. The Taste of Rain. Orca Book Publishers. (Canada/set in China)
- Ross, Alisa. The Girl Who Rode a Shark: And Other Stories of Daring Women. Illus. by Amy Blackwell. Pajama Press. (Canada)
- Strange, Lucy. Our Castle by the Sea. Chicken House. (UK)
- Vecchini, Silvia. The Red Zone: An Earthquake Story. Trans. by Anna Barton. Illus. by Sualzo. Amulet Books. (Italy)

GRADES 9-12

- Adams, K.C. Perception: A Photo Series. Illus. by the author. HighWater Press. (Canada)
- Fried, Hédi. Questions I Am Asked About the Holocaust. Trans. by Alice E. Olsson. Scribe Publications. (Sweden)
- Kwaymullina Ambelin & Kwaymullina, Ezekiel. The Things She’s Seen. Alfred A. Knopf. (Australia)
- Magnason, Andri Snær. The Casket of Time. Trans. by Björg Árnadóttir & Andrew Cauthery. Yonder. (Iceland)
- Petreca, Guilherme. Ye. Trans. by Andrea Rosenberg. Illus. by the author. Top Shelf Productions. (Brazil)
- Sedgwick, Marcus & Sedgwick, Julian. Voyages in the Underworld of Orpheus Black. Illus. by Alexis Deacon. Walker Books. (UK)
- Various authors. This Place: 150 Years Retold. Illus. by various artists. HighWater Press. (Canada)

== The 14th OIB List (2019) ==
A total of 39 titles were selected.

Pre K-2

- Buitrago, Jairo. On the Other Side of the Garden. Trans. by Elisa Amado. Illus. by Rafael Yockteng. Groundwood Books. (Chile)
- Chabbert, Ingrid. A Drop of the Sea. Trans. from French. Illus. by Guridi. Kids Can Press. (France)
- Clarke, Maxine Beneba. The Patchwork Bike. Illus. by Van Thanh Rudd. Candlewick Press. (Australia)
- Crowther, Kitty. Stories of the Night. Trans. by Julia Marshall. Illus. by the author. Gecko Press. (Sweden)
- de Arias, Patricia. Marwan’s Journey. Trans. from Spanish. Illus. by Laura Borràs. Minedition. (Chile)
- Dubuc, Marianne. Up the Mountain Path. Illus. by the author. Princeton Architectural Press. (Canada)
- Gomi, Taro. I Really Want to See You, Grandma. Trans. from Japanese. Illus. by the author. Chronicle Books. (Japan)
- Grant, Shauntay. Africville. Illus. by Eva Campbell. Groundwood Books. (Canada)
- Kaadan, Nadine. Tomorrow. Trans. and Illus. by the author. Lantana Publishing. (Syria)
- Latour, Francie. Auntie Luce’s Talking Paintings. Illus. by Ken Daley. Groundwood Books. (Canada/set in Haiti)
- Nilsson, Ulf. A Case for Buffy. Trans. by Julia Marshall. Illus. by Gitte Spee. Gecko Press. (Sweden)
- Sanna, Francesca. Me and My Fear. Illus. by the author. Flying Eye Books. (UK)
- Soundar, Chitra. Farmer Falgu Goes to the Market. Illus. by Kanika Nair. Karadi Tales. (India)

Grades 3-5

- Blexbolex. Vacation. Illus. by the author. Enchanted Lion. (France)
- Duprat, Guillaume. Eye Spy: Wild Ways Animals See the World. Trans. by Patrick Skipworth. Illus. by the author. What On Earth Books. (France)
- Edwards, Nicola. What a Wonderful Word. Illus. by Luisa Uribe. Kane Miller. (UK)
- Gifford, Clive. The Colors of History: How Colors Shaped the World. Illus. by Marc-Etienne Peintre. Quarto Publishing. (UK)
- Green, Shari. Missing Mike. Pajama Press. (Canada)
- Ho, Van & Skrypuch, Marsha Forchuk. Too Young to Escape. Pajama Press. (Canada/set in Vietnam)
- Kacer, Kathy. The Sound of Freedom. Annick Press. (Canada)
- Kinew, Wab. Go Show the World: A Celebration of Indigenous Heroes. Illus. by Joe Morse. Tundra Books. (Canada)
- Lewis, Gill. A Story Like the Wind. Illus. by Jo Weaver. Eerdmans Publishing. (UK)
- Parr, Maria. Astrid the Unstoppable. Trans. by Guy Puzey. Illus. by Katie Harnett. Candlewick Press. (Norway)
- Walters, Eric. From the Heart of Africa: A Book of Wisdom. Illus. include original art from African countries. Tundra Books. (Canada)
- Widmark, Martin. The House of Lost and Found. Trans. by Polly Lawson. Illus. by Emilia Dziubak. Floris Books. (Sweden)
- Wilcox, Merrie-Ellen. After Life: Ways We Think About Death. Orca Book Publishers. (Canada)
- Winter, Ali. Peace and Me. Illus. by Mickaël El Fathi. Lantana Publishing. (UK)

Grades 6-8

- Bailey, Linda. Mary Who Wrote Frankenstein. Illus. by Júlia Sardà. Tundra Books. (Canada)
- Ellis, Sarah. Dodger Boy. Groundwood Books. (Canada)
- First News/Walker Books Ltd. Voices from the Second World War: Stories of War as Told to Children of Today. Candlewick Press. (UK)
- Hargrave, Kiran Millwood. The Island at the End of Everything. Alfred A. Knopf. (UK/set in the Philippines)
- Nielsen, Susin. No Fixed Address. Penguin Random House Canada Young Readers. (Canada)
- Orr, Wendy. Swallow's Dance. Pajama Press. (Canada)
- Smith, Heather. Ebb & Flow. Kids Can Press. (Canada)
- Tregonning, Mel. Small Things. Illus. by the author. Pajama Press. (Australia)
- Williamson, Victoria. The Fox Girl and the White Gazelle. Floris Books. (Scotland)

Grades 9-12

- Barter, Catherine. Troublemakers. Carolrhoda Books. (UK)
- Mills, Jean. Skating Over Thin Ice. Red Deer Press. (Canada)
- Ntshingila, Futhi. We Kiss Them With Rain. Catalyst Press. (South Africa)

== The 13th OIB List (2018) ==
A total of 38 titles were selected.
Pre K-2

- ATINUKE, You're Amazing, Anna Hibiscus! illus. by Lauren Tobia
- BUITRAGO, Jairo. Walk With Me. tr. by Elisa Amado. illus. by Rafael Yockteng
- CHRISTOPHER, Danny. Putuguq & Kublu. illus. by Astrid Arijanto. Inhabit Media. (Iqaluit) (Canada)
- FULLERTON, Alma. When the Rain Comes. illus. by Kim La Fave. Pajama Pr.
- GAN, Dayong. Little Rabbit's Questions. tr. by Helen Wang. illus. by author. Candied Plums. (China)
- HOHN, Nadia L. Malaika's Winter Carnival. illus. by Irene Luxbacher. Groundwood. (Canada)
- HONG, Nari. Days With Dad. illus. by author. Enchanted Lion. (South Korea)
- JOCELYN, Marthe. Sam Sorts (One Hundred Favorite Things). illus. by author. Tundra. (Canada)
- KRAULIS, Julie. A Pattern for Pepper. illus. by author. Tundra. (Canada)
- MIYAKOSHI, Akiko. The Way Home in the Night. illus. by author. Kids Can Pr. (Japan)
- PARKER, Danny. Molly & Mae. illus. by Freya Blackwood. HMH. (Australia)
- SCHWARTZ, Joanne. Town Is by the Sea. illus. by Sydney Smith. Groundwood. (Canada)
- SHER, Emil. Away. illus. by Qin Leng. Groundwood. (Canada)
- SIMLER, Isabelle. Plume. illus. by author. Eerdmans. (France)
- STARKOFF, Vanina. Along the River. tr. by Jane Springer. illus. by author. Groundwood. (Brazil)
- USHER, Sam. Rain. illus. by author. Candlewick/Templar Bks. (UK)

Grades 3–5

- BATE, Helen. Peter in Peril: Courage and Hope in World War Two. illus. by author. Otter-Barry Books. (UK/set in Hungary)
- CAO, Wenxuan. Bronze and Sunflower. tr. by Helen Wang. illus. by Meilo So. Candlewick. (China)
- CAO, Wenxuan. Feather. tr. by Chloe Garcia Roberts. illus. by Roger Mello. Elsewhere Editions. (China)
- FLINT, Shamini. Ten: A Soccer Story. Clarion. (Singapore/set in Malaysia)
- FRIER, Raphaëlle. Malala: Activist for Girls’ Education. tr. by Julie Cormier. illus. by Aurélia Fronty. Charlesbridge. (France/set in Pakistan)
- GOLDSTYN, Jacques. Bertolt. tr. by Claudia Zoe Bedrick. illus. by author. Enchanted Lion. (Canada)
- HARBRIDGE, Paul. When the Moon Comes. illus. by Matt James. Tundra. (Canada)
- IWASA, Migumi. Yours Sincerely, Giraffe. tr. by Cathy Hirano. illus. by Jun Takabatake. Gecko. (Japan)
- KULLING, Monica. Mary Anning's Curiosity. illus. by Melissa Castrillon. Groundwood.
- LEACH, Sara. Slug Days . illus. by Rebecca Bender. Pajama Pr. (Canada)
- MELLO, Roger. You Can't Be Too Careful! tr. by Daniel Hahn. illus. by author. Elsewhere Editions. (Brazil)
- VALCKX, Catharina. Bruno: Some of the More Interesting Days in My Life So Far. tr. by Antony Shugaar. illus. by Nicolas Hubesch. Gecko. (France)

Grades 6–8

- BRITT, Fanny. Louis Undercover. tr. by Christelle Morelli & Susan Ouriou. illus. by Isabelle Arsenault. Groundwood. (Canada)
- GREEN, Shari. Macy McMillan and the Rainbow Goddess. Pajama Pr. (Canada)
- HARDINGE, Frances. A Face Like Glass. Abrams/Amulet. (UK)
- KULLAB, Samya. Escape From Syria. illus. by Jackie Roche. Colors by Mike Freiheit. Firefly. (Canada/set in Lebanon)
- WEGELIUS, Jakob. The Murderer's Ape. tr. by Peter Graves. illus. by author. Delacorte. (Sweden)

Grades 9–12

- CROWLEY, Cath. Words in Deep Blue. Knopf. (Australia)
- HARDINGE, Frances. A Skinful of Shadows. Abrams/ Amulet. (UK)
- KWAYMULLINA, Ambelin. The Foretelling of Georgie Spider. Candlewick. (Australia)
- MAYHEW, Julie. The Big Lie. Candlewick. (UK)
- SMITH, Heather. The Agony of Bun O’Keefe. Penguin Teen Canada. (Canada)

== The 12th OIB List (2017) ==
A total of 41 titles were selected.
Pres-Gr 2

- DEGENNARO, Sue. The Pros and Cons of Being a Frog. illus. by the author. S. & S./Paula Wiseman Bks. Australia.
- DUBUC, Marianne. The Animals’ Ark. tr. from French. illus. by author. Kids Can. Canada.
- HIRST, Daisy. The Girl with the Parrot on her Head. illus. by author. Candlewick. UK.
- HOHN, Nadia L. Malaika's Costume. illus. by Irene Luxbacher. Groundwood. Canada/set in the Caribbean.
- LANTHIER, Jennifer. Hurry Up, Henry. illus. by Isabelle Malenfant. Puffin. Canada.
- LEROY, Jean. A Well-Mannered Young Wolf. tr. from French. illus. by Matthieu Maudet. Eerdmans. France.
- O’LEARY, Sara. A Family Is a Family Is a Family. illus. by Qin Leng. Groundwood. Canada.
- ROCHA, Ruth. Lines, Squiggles, Letters, Words. tr. from Portuguese by Lyn Miller-Lachmann. illus. by Madalena Matoso. Enchanted Lion. Brazil.
- SANNA, Francesca. The Journey. illus. by author. Flying Eye. UK.
- STARK, Ulf. The Midsummer Tomte and the Little Rabbits. tr. from Swedish by Susan Beard. illus. by Eva Eriksson. Floris. Sweden.
- VISWANATH, Shobha. The Blue Jackal. illus. by Dileep Joshi. Eerdmans. India.

Grades 3–5

- ARGUETA, Jorge. Somos Como Las Nubes/We Are Like the Clouds. tr. by Elisa Amado. illus. by Alfonso Ruano. Groundwood. Canada.
- CORNILLE, Didier. Who Built That? Bridges: An Introduction to Ten Great Bridges and Their Designers. tr. from French by Yolanda Stern Broad. illus. by author. Princeton Architectural. France.
- FABER, Polly. Mango & Bambang, the Not-a-Pig. illus. by Clara Vulliamy. Candlewick. UK.
- FENTON, Corinne. Bob the Railway Dog: The True Story of an Adventurous Dog. illus. by Andrew McLean. Candlewick. Australia.
- HURST, Elise. Imagine a City. illus. by author. Doubleday. Canada.
- KRISHNASWAMI, Uma. Book Uncle and Me. illus. by Julianna Swaney. Groundwood. Canada/set in India.
- KUHLMANN, Torben. Armstrong: The Adventurous Journey of a Mouse to the Moon. tr. from German by David Henry Wilson. illus. by the author. NorthSouth. Germany.
- KUHN, Camilla. Samira and the Skeletons. tr. from Norwegian by Don Bartlett. illus. by author. Eerdmans. Norway.
- LAGERCRANTZ, Rose. Life According to Dani. tr. from Swedish by Julia Marshall. illus. by Eva Eriksson. Gecko. Sweden.
- MARTINS, Isabel Minhós. Don't Cross the Line. tr. from Portuguese by Daniel Hahn. illus. by Bernardo P. Carvalho. Gecko. Portugal.
- MULLER, Gerda. A Year in Our New Garden. tr. from German. illus. by the author. Floris. Germany.
- PARVELA, Timo. Bicycling to the Moon. tr. from Finnish by Ruth Urbom. illus. by Virpi Talfitie. Gecko. Finland.
- PINFOLD, Levi. Greenling. illus. by the author. Candlewick/Templar. Australia.
- ROSSELL, Judith. Withering by Sea. illus. by the author. S. & S./Atheneum. Australia.
- SANABRIA, JOSÉ. As Time Went By. tr. from German. illus. by the author. NorthSouth. Switzerland.

Grades 6–8

- BOGART, Jo Ellen. The White Cat and the Monk: A Retelling of the Poem “Pangur Ban” illus. by Sydney Smith. Groundwood. Canada.
- Longbow-GirlDAVIES, Linda. Longbow Girl. Scholastic/Chicken House. UK.
- HARDSTAFF, Jane. The Executioner's Daughter. Lerner/Carolrhoda. UK.
- LEA, Synne. Night Guard. tr. from Norwegian by John Irons. illus. by Stian Hole. Eerdmans. Norway.
- LUURTSEMA, Nat. Goldfish. Feiwel and Friends. UK.
- STEVENSON, Robin. Pride: Celebrating Diversity and Community. Orca. Canada.
- SVINGEN, Arne. The Ballad of a Broken Nose. tr. from Norwegian by Kari Dickinson. S. & S./Margaret K. McElderry Bks. Norway.

Grades 9–12

- ACIOLI, Socorro. The Head of the Saint. tr. from Portuguese by Daniel Hahn. Delacorte. Brazil.
- DOWNHAM, Jenny. Unbecoming. Scholastic. UK.
- HARDINGE, Frances. The Lie Tree. Abrams. UK.
- LEWIS, Amanda West. The Pact. Red Deer. Canada/set in Germany.
- WILLIAMSON, Lisa. The Art of Being Normal. Farrar/Margaret Ferguson Bks. UK.
- WOLTZ, Anna. A Hundred Hours of Night. tr. from Dutch by Laura Watkinson. Scholastic/Arthur A. Levine Bks. Netherlands.
- WRIGHT, David & Lu Bouchard. Away Running. Orca. Canada/set in France.
- WUNG-SUNG, Jesper. The Last Execution. tr. from Danish by Lindy Falk van Rooyen. Atheneum/Caitlyn Dlouhy Bks. Denmark.

== The first 11 OIB Lists (2006–2016) ==
- 2016 Hong, Terry. (2016, February). [Welcome disruptions." School Library Journal. 34–27. 2016
- 2015 Dales, Brenda. (2015, February 4). "USBBY Presents Its Annual Outstanding International Books List." School Library Journal. 2015
- 2014 Dales, Brenda. (2014, February 24). "Passport to a World of Reading: USBBY's 2014 Outstanding International Books List Introduces Readers to the Global Community." School Library Journal. 2014
- 2013 Salvadore, Maria. (2013, February 5). "The Literary Equation: USBBY´s Outstanding International Books connect kids worldwide." School Library Journal.34–37. 2013
- 2012 East, Kathy. (2012, February 1). "All Together Now: USBBY´s Outstanding International Books connect kids worldwide." School Library Journal. 44–47. 2012
- 2011 Poe, Elizabeth. (2011, February 1). "Here, There, and Everywhere: The United States Board on Books for Young People cites 40 international books for its * 2011 honor list." School Library Journal. 42–46. 2011
- 2010 Pope, Elizabeth. (2010, February 1). "Crisscrossing the Globe: A World of International Books for Young People." School Library Journal. 42–45. 2010
- 2009 Angus, Carolyn. (2009, February 1). "World Class: The Latest Outstanding International Books List Offers Tales that Speak to Every Student." School Library Journal. 36–39. 2009
- 2008 Angus, Carolyn. (2008, February 1). "A World of Stories: 2008 Outstanding International Books." School Library Journal. 44–47. 2008
- 2007 Isaacs, Kathleen. (2007, February 1). "Book Your Trip Now: The Outstanding International Booklist Is Just the Ticket to Take Readers to Some Faraway Places." School Library Journal. 44–48. 2007
- 2006 Isaacs, Kathleen. (2006, February 1). "It´s a Big World After All: Books Are the Best Way to Open Kids´ Minds." School Library Journal. 40–44. 2006
