= Wanda John-Kehewin =

Canadian author and poet

Wanda John-Kehewin is a Cree-Métis (Kehewin Cree Nation) author and poet.

== Early life and education ==
John-Kehewin grew up on the Kehewin reserve in Alberta, but did not grow up speaking Cree. She lived with her mother, a Métis woman who struggled with alcoholism, for parts of her childhood. John-Kehewin began writing poetry at age six, as a way to express he feelings. She became aware of the lack of literature centering First Nations voices at a young age, after seeing the lack of representation in the books in her reserve's library. At age 19, John-Kehewin became pregnant. She left her reserve and traveled to Vancouver.

She attended Douglas College, where she studied criminology, and she also studied Sociology and Aboriginal Studies at Langara College. She earned her Master of Fine Arts at University of British Columbia. In 2011, she completed The Writer's Studio, a creative writing program at Simon Fraser University.

== Career ==
John-Kehewin has worked for the Canadian Ministry of Children and Families.

John-Kehewin released her first graphic novel, Visions of the Crow, in 2023, with illustrations by Nicole Marie Burton. The story features a Cree-Métis teenager who tries to figure out his relationship to a crow and a new girl at his school, while also dealing with his mother's alcoholism and life away from his Alberta reserve. It is the first in a planned trilogy.

Her first young adult novel, Hopeless in Hope, was published by Highwater Press in September 2023. It won the 2024 Sheila A. Egoff Children's Literature Prize and was included among the 41 titles selected for the 2024 USBBY Outstanding International Books List.

== Personal life ==
John-Kehewin lives in Coquitlam, British Columbia as of 2025. She has five children.

== Books ==
=== Poetry collections ===
- In the Dog House (2013), Talonbooks
- Seven Sacred Truths (2018), Talonbooks
- Spells, Wishes, and the Talking Dead ᒪᒪᐦᑖᐃᐧᓯᐃᐧᐣ ᐸᑯᓭᔨᒧᐤ ᓂᑭᐦᒋ ᐋᓂᐢᑯᑖᐹᐣ mamahtâwisiwin, pakosêyimow, nikihci-âniskotâpân (2023)
  - Nominated: League of Canadian Poets 2023 Raymond Souster Award

=== Graphic novels ===
==== Dreams trilogy ====
- Visions of the Crow: Vol. 1. 2023.
- Visions From The Fire: Vol. 2. Illustrated by nicole marie burton, Kielamel Sibal, and Rhael McGregor. Winnipeg: Highwater Press. 2026. ISBN 9781774920657.

=== Novels ===
- Hopeless in Hope (2023), HighWater Press
  - 2024 Sheila A. Egoff Children's Literature Prize
  - 2024 USBBY Outstanding International Books List
  - Shortlist: 2024 Ruth and Sylvia Schwartz Children's Book Awards; Middle Reader category
  - Nominated: 2025 Northern Lights Award, Manitoba Young Readers' Choice Awards
  - Nominated: 2025 Red Maple Award, Forest of Reading

=== Children's books ===
- Miya Wears Orange (2025); illustrated by Erika Rodriguez Medina

== Awards ==
- World Poetry Empowered Poet Award 2018, for In the Dog House
- Finalist for the Indigenous Voices Awards 2019, Published Poetry in English, for Seven Sacred Truths
