= Ancient Thunder =

2006 children's fantasy picture book by Leo Yerxa

- Book Cover, 2006 edition
- Author: Leo Yerxa
- Illustrator: Leo Yerxa
- Language: English
- Genre: Children's literature
- Publisher: Groundwood Books
- Publication date: 3 August 2006
- Publication place: Canada

Ancient Thunder is a children's fantasy picture book by the Canadian artist and writer Leo Yerxa, simultaneously published in Canada and the United States in 2006. It won the 2006 Governor General's Award for Children's Illustration and the 2008 Saskatchewan Willow Award for picture books. Ancient Thunder was both illustrated and written by Leo Yerxa.

== Summary ==
This book describes the relationship of horses and First Nation's cultures with a single poem and illustrations using water-colour artwork. Only few lines of text per page contrast with painted images associated with native culture.

== Concept and development ==
Yerxa was interested by the native people while he watched them ride across the Great Plains in the movie when he was a child, their traditional clothing and the running creatures inspired Yerxa to write this book. He used handmade water-colour paper and made it look like leather.

== Awards ==
Year	Literary awards	Result	Ref.
2006	Governor General's Literary Awards	Won	
2007	First Nation Communities Read	Won	
2008	Willow Awards	Won	
2007	Anskohk Aboriginal Children's Book of the Year Award	Nominated	
2007	Ruth and Sylvia Schwartz Award	Nominated	
