= Sylvia Olsen =

Canadian writer and public speaker

Sylvia Olsen (born 1955 or 1956) is a Canadian writer and public speaker.

== Biography ==
Olsen was born and raised in a middle-class family in Victoria, British Columbia.

In 1972, Olsen married Carl, who is Coast Salish, and moved to Tsartlip First Nation, where she lived for 35 years. During her time in Tsartlip, she raised her three children, began a few small businesses, and began working in the Tsartlip housing department, a passion that led to a number of career developments later on. Also during this time, she began questioning the differences between her privileged upbringing at those of First Nation Canadians. These questions and life experiences have greatly shaped her art and academic endeavours. In 1996, Sylvia achieved a PHd from the University of Victoria. Her dissertation was on the history of on-reserve housing programs in Canada.

Later, Olsen's family adopted another son from Brazil, and her children have bore her eight grandchildren, most of whom live in Tsarlip.

Olsen married her current husband, Tex McLeod, when she was 63. They live in North Saanich on Vancouver Island in British Columbia, just north of Tsartlip.

== Career ==
Olsen has been a founding member at a number of housing organizations for Canadian First Nations communities, including the First Nations Housing & Infrastructure Council for British Columbia. She was also a member of the Assembly of First Nations Chiefs Committee on Housing & Infrastructure.

She also "helped develop the curriculum for and teaches the First Nations Housing Management Certificate Program at Vancouver Island University."

== Awards ==
Year	Title	Award	Result	Ref.
2005	White Girl	Sheila A. Egoff Children’s Literature Prize	Shortlist	
2007	Yetsa's Sweater	Bill Duthie Booksellers’ Choice Award		
2011	Working with Wool	Roderick Haig-Brown Regional Prize	Shortlist	Winner Lieutenant Governor's Medal for Historical Writing
2010	Counting on Hope	Sheila A. Egoff Children’s Literature Prize	Shortlist	
2010	Which Way Should I Go?	PMC Indigenous Literature Award	Winner	
2014	Molly's Promise	Diamond Willow Award	Finalist	
2020	Neekah's Knitting Needles	PMC Indigenous Literature Award	Shortlist	

== Publications ==
=== Children's books ===
- No Time to Say Goodbye: Children's Stories of Kuper Island Residential School, with Rita Morris and Ann Sam (2002)
- Catching Spring (2004)
- Murphy and Mousetrap (2005)
- Yetsa's Sweater (2007)
- Which Way Should I Go?, with Ron Martin, illustrated by Kasia Charko (2008)
- A Different Game (2010)
- Sebastian Sasquatch, illustrated by Kasia Charko (2013)
- Son Who Returns, with Gary Robinson (2014)
- Neekah's Knitting Needles, with Odelia Smith, illustrated by Sheena Lott (2020)

=== Young adult novels ===
- The Girl with a Baby (2003)
- White Girl (2004)
- Just Ask Us (2005)
- Yellow Line (2005)
- Middle Row (2008)
- Counting on Hope (2010)
- Molly's Promise (2013)
- Breathing Fire, with Sarah Yi-Mei Tsiang (2014)

=== Nonfiction ===
- Working with Wool: A Coast Salish Legacy and the Cowichan Sweater (2010)
- knitting stories (2014)
- life cycle of a LIE (2014)
- Growing Up Elizabeth May: The Making of an Activist, with Cate May Burton (2021)
- Unravelling Canada: A Knitting Odyssey (2021)
