= How War Changed Rondo =

Ukrainian picture book

How War Changed Rondo (Ukrainian: Війна, що змінила Рондо; translit. Viina, shcho zminyla Rondo) is a Ukrainian picture book written and illustrated by the artists Romana Romanyshyn and Andriy Lesiv. It was first published in Ukraine in 2015 by Vydavnytstvo Staroho Leva.

== Awards and recognition ==
- Bologna Ragazzi Award in 2015.
- Selected for The White Ravens catalogue (2015)
- Included on USBBY’s ''Outstanding International Books'' list (2022)
