= Joseph Kakwinokanasum =

Cree writer from Canada

Joseph Kakwinokanasum is a Cree writer from Canada, whose debut novel My Indian Summer was published in 2022.

A member of the James Smith Cree Nation in Saskatchewan, he grew up in the Peace River Country region of northern British Columbia, and graduated from Simon Fraser University's Writer's Studio program in 2018. He has published various short stories and non-fiction pieces in Canadian literary magazines, and was shortlisted in the Creative Non-fiction category of the CBC Literary Prize in 2020 for "Ray Says".

In 2022, he was selected for the Writers' Trust of Canada's Rising Stars program, receiving a mentorship from Darrel J. McLeod.

My Indian Summer won the award for Young Adult/Adult Literature at the PMC Indigenous Literature Awards in 2023, and was shortlisted for the ReLit Award for Novel.
