= Jella Lepman =

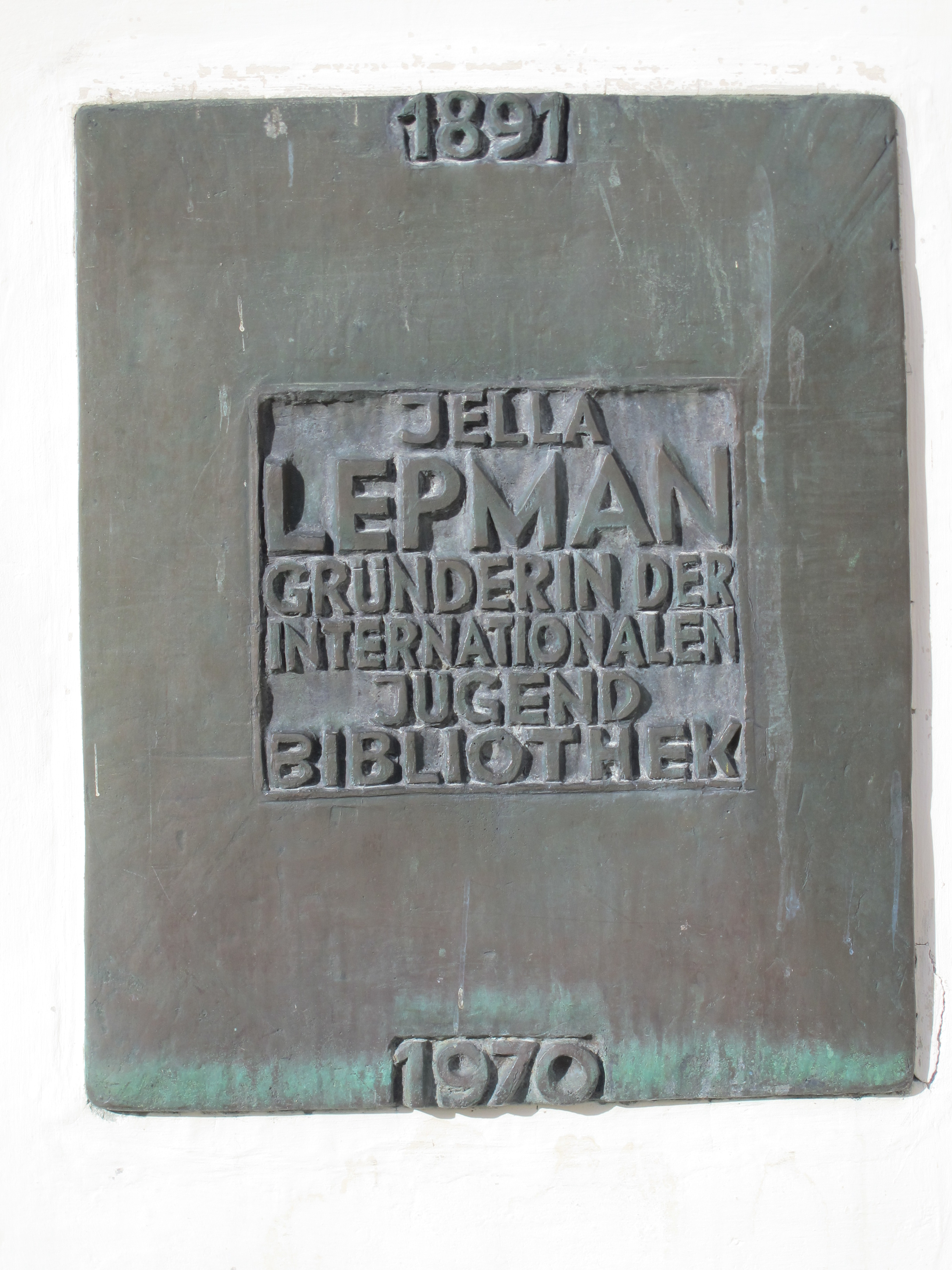
Memorial plaque for Jella Lepman at the international youth library in Blutenburg castel

Jella Lepman (15 May 1891, in Stuttgart – 4 October 1970, in Zurich) was a German journalist, author and translator who founded the International Youth Library in Munich.

== Life ==
Jella Lehman, born in Stuttgart, was the oldest daughter of the manufacturer Josef Lehmann (1853–1911) and his wife Flora (née Lauchheimer; 1867–1940). The family were members of the Jewish-liberal Judaism. Through her mother she was a cousin of the four-year younger Max Horkheimer. After her schooling at the Königin-Katharina-Stift-Gymnasium in Stuttgart, she spent a year near Lausanne, Switzerland. At the age of 17, in 1908, she organised an international reading room for the children of foreign works at a tobacco factory in an industrial quarter of Stuttgart.

In 1913 she married Gustav Horace Lepman (1877–1922), the German-American co-owner of a bedspring factory in Stuttgart-Feuerbach. Together they had two children: (Anne-Marie, born in 1918, Günther, born in 1921). During the World War I Gustav Lepman served as an officer in the German army on the battlefields in France. He died as the result of his war injuries in 1922, leaving her widowed at age 31.

After the death of her husband, Jella Lepman became editor of the Stuttgarter Neues Tagblatt, the first woman ever to hold this position. She wrote socio-political contributions and in 1927 introduced the newspaper supplement for women titled "The woman in house, profession and society". In addition, she published her first children's book (1927 The Sleeping Sunday) and a theatrical play for children (1929 The Singing Pfennig) which was performed on the smaller state of the Württemberg State Theatre. She became a member of the German Democratic Party (Deutsche Demokratische Partei, DDP), where she was a leader in the women's group. In 1929, she ran, unsuccessfully, for the German Reichstag.

With the Nazi seizure of power in 1933, Jella Lepman, as a Jew, lost her job at the newspaper, but was able to continue working for it as a freelancer until 1935. In 1936, she emigrated with her two children via Italy to England. With her children cared for in boarding schools, she initially took on freelance journalistic and literary assignments. In 1938 she helped organise the papers of Arthur Schnitzler which had recently arrived at the University of Cambridge. Later, she worked for the BBC and the American Broadcasting Station in Europe (ABSIE). In 1942 she published a German-language reader titled Die Kinder vom Kuckuckshof, eine Detektivgeschichte aus dem Schwarzwald for the publisher John Murray and in 1943, under the pseudonym Katherine Thomas, the book Women in Nazi Germany .

== After the war ==
After the end of World War II, she returned to Germany in October 1945 as a consultant to the US Army as part of the Reeducation program of the American occupied zone, and responsible for programmes for women and youth. She lived first in Bad Homburg vor der Höhe, then in Munich. In 1946 she organised the first international exhibition in post-war Germany, the Internationale Jugendbuchausstellung, which displayed 2000 books from 14 countries. It was shown in several large cities around Germany and visited by over one million people. These books became the founding collection for the International Youth Library which was opened in the Schwabing section of Munich 14 September 1949. She remained its director until her retirement in 1957.

During the reconstruction of Germany, she was convinced that placing books into the hands of the children would offer them hope for the future. In 1952 she initiated a conference about international understanding through children's books, which led to the foundation of the non-profit International Board on Books for Young People in Zurich in 1953. Lepman wrote more in detail about this time of her life in her autobiographical book A Bridge of Children's Books. She was one of the initiators of the Hans Christian Andersen Award, the world's most important award for writers and illustrators of young people's literature. It was first issued in 1956, and she served as its jury president from 1956 to 1960.

Jella Lepman wrote many children’s books and collections of children’s stories, including a multivolume collection of bedtime stories that she collected over the years. Her books have been translated into many different languages. She gave her friend Erich Kästner the idea that inspired his children's book The Animals' Conference (Die Konferenz der Tiere, 1949).

Lepman died in 1970 at the age of 79 years in Zurich and her final resting place was in the Zurich Enzenbühl cemetery on Forchstraße. The grave no longer exists. There is a street named after her in Stuttgart, and a room named after her in Stuttgart's main public library on Mailänder-Platz. In Munich a street and a child-care centre are named after her in the city quarter of Berg am Laim.

Since 1991, in honor of Lepman's 100th birthday, the International Board on Books for Young People awards the "Jella-Lepman Medal" to individuals who have made a significant contribution to children's literature.

== Publications by Jella Lepman ==
- Der verschlafene Sonntag, illus. by Hermann Gradl. W. Hädecke, Stuttgart, 1927. Facsimile edition: Bröstler, Marktheidenfeld, 1992. ISBN 978-3-927439-11-5
- Das Geheimnis vom Kuckuckshof – Eine Detektivgeschichte aus dem Schwarzwald 1st ed. London, John Murray, London, 1942.
- Wer ist Lux? Eine Detektivgeschichte für die Jugend, ill. by Paul Flora. Ensslin & Laiblin, Reutlingen, 1950.
- Die Katze mit der Brille – Die schönsten Gutenachtgeschichten, collected by Jella Lepman, ed. by Hansjörg Schmitthenner, illus. by Regina Ackermann-Ophüls. Europa-Verlag, Zurich, Vol. 1, 1951; Vol. 2, 1959. Reprinted Zeitverlag Bucerius, Hamburg, 2006. ISBN 978-3-938899-02-1
- Der verhaftete Papagei : die schönsten Gute Nacht Geschichten : neueste Folge, ed. by Hansjörg Schmitthenner, ill. by Jutta Kirsch-Korn. Ullstein, Berlin, 1963. ISBN 978-3-548-12534-3
- Die Kinderbuchbrücke, S. Fischer, Frankfurt, 1964.
  - A Bridge of Children's Books, transl. by Edith McCormick, foreword by J.E. Morpurgo. Leicester: Brockhampton Press, Leicester; American Library Association, New York 1969. ISBN 0-340-03205-7
  - A Bridge of Children's Books, transl. by Edith McCormick, foreword by Mary Robinson. The O'Brien Press, Dublin, 2002, ISBN 0-86278-783-1
  - Kodomo no hon wa sekai no kakehashi, transl. by Morimoto Manami. Kogumasha, Tokyo, 2002. ISBN 978-4-7721-9037-4
  - Jia qi er tong tu shu de qiao liang, Zhongguo shao nian er tong chu ban she, Beijing, 2006. ISBN 978-7-5007-8080-9
  - Oerini Chaekui Dali, transl. by Sun-Ah Kang. Nami Books, Seoul, 2015. ISBN 978-89-966836-6-7
  - Un ponte di libri, cura e traduzione di Anna Patrucco Becchi. Roma: Sinnos, 2018. ISBN 978-88-7609-393-7
  - Un Puente de Libros Infantiles, Creotz, 2017. ISBN 978-84-941473-8-8
  - La strada di Jella : prima fermata Monaco, traduzione dall'inglese di Ilaria Piperno. Roma: Sinnos, 2009. ISBN 978-88-7609-137-7
- Kinder sehen unsere Welt – Texte und Zeichnungen aus 35 Ländern, collected and edited by Jella Lepman. Ullstein, 1971. ISBN 978-3-550-07766-1
  - Come i bambini vedono il mondo, transl. by Amina Pandolfi. Garzanti, Milan, 1972.
  - How children see our world : words and pictures from thirty-five countries, translated from the German by Heide Dugall, designed by Dietmar Meyer and Frank Curcio. Avon Books, New York, 1975. ISBN 978-0-380-00529-1

== Books about Jella Lepman ==
- Kathy Stinson. The Lady with the Books: A Story Inspired by the Remarkable Work of Jella Lepman. Illus. by Marie Lafrance. Kids Can Press (2020). (Canada)
- Sydelle Pearl, Danlyn Iantorno, illus. Books for Children of the World: The Story of Jella Lepman. Pelican Publishing, 2007.

== Awards ==
- 1957 Order of Merit of the Federal Republic of Germany
- 1960 Goethe Medal
