= International Youth Library =

German library for international children's and young adults literature

- Internationale Jugendbibliothek
- 48°09′48″N 11°27′26″E
- Location: Blutenburg Castle, Munich, Bavaria, Germany
- Type: Research and Public Library
- Scope: International children's and youth literature
- Established: September 14, 1949

Collection
- Items collected: Books, electronic media, periodicals, author estates, illustrations
- Size: 600,000+ volumes

Other information
- Director: Christiane Raabe (since 2007)
- Parent organization: Funded by the German Federal Foreign Office and the State of Bavaria
- Website: www.ijb.de/en/home

The International Youth Library (IYL) (Internationale Jugendbibliothek, IJB) in Munich is a library that specializes in the collection of children and youth literature from around the world in order to make them available to the public, focusing on the international community. This library is the largest of its kind worldwide, and has been operating since June 1983, in Blutenburg Castle in the Munich district Obermenzing, before this time the library was located in Schwabing.

== Profile ==
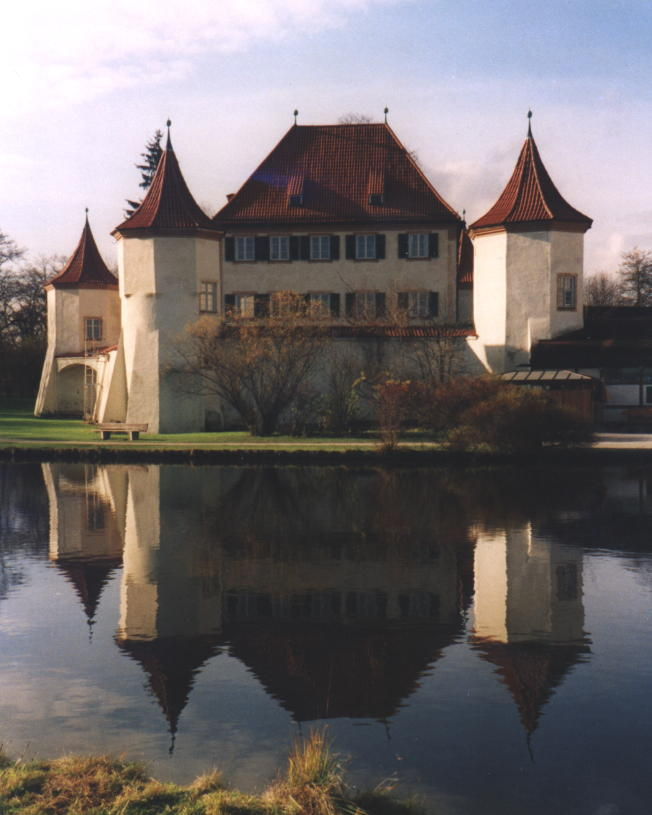
Blutenburg Castle

The International Youth Library is a center for International Child and Youth literature, offering reading sessions, workshops, podium discussions, developmental programs, exhibitions and through the assistance of other literary establishments, a forum for international child and youth literature.

Since 2010, The International Youth Library has been hosting the White Ravens Festival for International Child and Youth literature, held every 2 years, and in 2013 the first James Krüss prize for international child and youth literature, to be awarded every 2 years, was handed out allowing a new author to be discovered and recognized for his accomplishments.

The White Ravens recommendation list and the yearbook "Das Bücherschloss" (Castle of Books) assist in the discussions about international child and youth literature. With its "Arche Kinder Kalenders" (Arche Calendar for Children) the library broadens the cultural horizons for children.

Through readings, writing workshops and workshops for exhibitions, literature museums and children literary themes, the library has become a key partner for schools, and daycares. The children's library contains over 30.000 books and electronic media in over 20 different languages that is available free to borrow.

== History ==
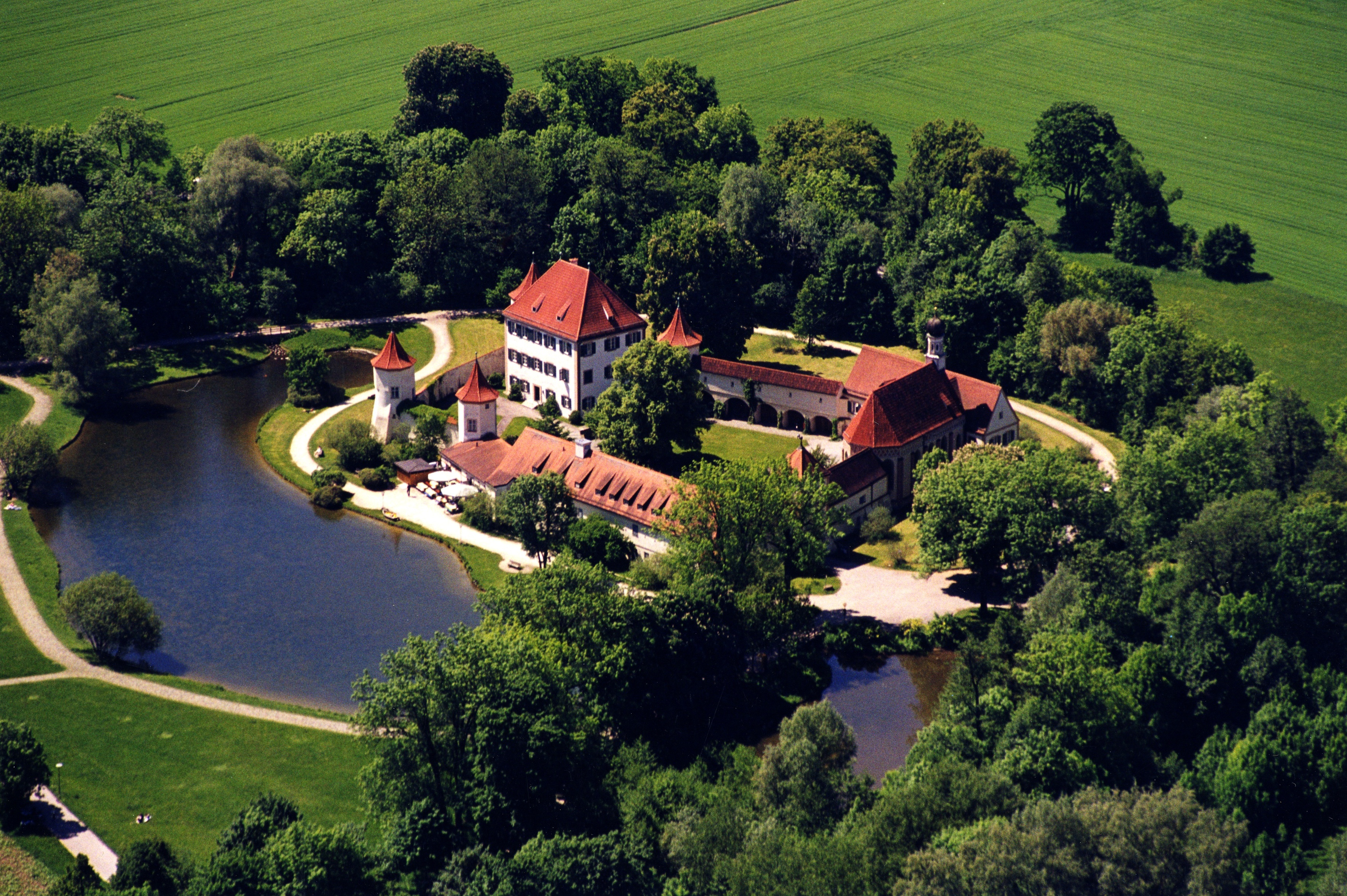
Aerial View

The Munich library was founded in 1949 by the journalist and author Jella Lepman. The idea was a huge success because of the youth book exhibition in 1946, from which the exhibition material became the basis for the library's collection. On 14 September 1949, the international youth library opened with a collection of over 8000 volumes. Jella Lepman's idea to promote tolerance, reconciliation and understanding of other life forms and cultures with the help of international child and youth books as influential material, was received by the public with great interest. The international youth library serves as an archive of the valuable and rare collection, as well as a place for children's gathering and interacting and to promote its objectives.

== Collection ==
The international book inventories and historical collections of the library are one of a kind and made available to researchers in a scientific reading room for studies. A scholarship program for foreign scientists, financed by the Foreign Office, pursues the goal of supporting the research in the area of the international child and youth literature, supporting the illustration, and promoting scientific exchange and international co-operation.

The collection covers more than 600,000 child and youth books in 150 languages, including valuable collections of historical children's books. Also the library has more than 30,000 titles of international research literature as well as about 150 current technical periodicals in many languages. The library's catalog of books can be found over the Internet; also you can find other recommendations list there.

The collection is also expanding with the addition of estates from authors such as James Krüss or Hans Baumann.

== Literature museums ==
The library in Schloss Blutenburg serves home to several literature museums: The Michael-Ende-Museum (opened 1998), the James-Krüss-Tower, the Erich-Kästner-Room, and since July 2005 the Binette-Schroeder-Kabinett. Each showroom is filled with numerous books and illustrations and also letters, diaries and personal articles of the represented people.

== The White Ravens ==
The library also publishes an annual recommendation list for child and youth literature, White Ravens. The catalogue revealed each year at Bologna Children's Book Fair. Its contents are selected by a jury of language specialists, and include new releases from over 40 countries in more than 30 languages.

== Directors ==
- 1949–1957: Jella Lepman
- 1957–1982: Walter Scherf
- 1982–1983: Wolfgang Vogelsgesang
- 1983–1992: Andreas Bode
- 1992–2007: Barbara Scharioth
- since 2007: Christiane Raabe

== Literature ==
- Eva-Maria Ledig: Eine Idee für die Kinder. Die Internationale Jugendbibliothek in München. München: Erasmus Grasser-Verlag, 1988.
- Jella Lepman: Die Kinderbuchbrücke. Frankfurt: Fischer, 1964. (Neuauflage zum 50jährigen Bestehen der Internationalen Jugendbibliothek: München 1999.)
- Wolfgang Vogelsgesang (Hrsg.): Blutenburg. Das Schloß und sein Umfeld in Geschichte und Gegenwart. Wielenbach: Erasmus Grasser-Verlag, 1992. ISBN 3-925967-24-9 bzw. ISBN 3-925967-26-5
- Wally de Doncker 'Wie was Jella Lepman? Een portret ter gelegenheid van 50 jaar IBBY' Leesgoed, p. 190–192, 2ge jaargang 2002, deel 5, Biblion Uitgeverij, Den Haag
