= International Board on Books for Young People =

International nongovernmental organization

The International Board on Books for Young People (IBBY) is an international nonprofit organization committed to bringing books and children together. The headquarters of IBBY are located in Basel, Switzerland.

== History ==
In 1952, Jella Lepman organized a meeting in Munich, Germany, called "International Understanding through Children's Books". Many authors, publishers, teachers, and philosophers of the time attended the meeting and as a result a committee was appointed to create the International Board on Books for Young People.

A year later in 1953, IBBY was registered as a nonprofit organization in Zürich, Switzerland. The founding members included: Erich Kästner, Lisa Tetzner, Astrid Lindgren, Jo Tenfjord, Fritz Brunner, Bettina Hürlimann, and Richard Bamberger. IBBY established an international award called the Hans Christian Andersen Award in 1956 and since then has continued to award it every two years.

== Mission ==
IBBY has six key aims:

- to promote international understanding through children's books
- to give children everywhere the opportunity to have access to books with high literary and artistic standards
- to encourage the publication and distribution of quality children's books, especially in developing countries
- to provide support and training for those involved with children and children's literature
- to stimulate research and scholarly works in the field of children's literature
- to protect and uphold the rights of children according to the UN Convention on the Rights of the Child

== Organization ==
IBBY is composed of more than eighty national sections all over the world. It represents countries with well-developed book publishing and literacy programmes, as well as countries with only a few professionals doing pioneering work in children's book publishing and promotion.

IBBY's policies and programmes are determined by its executive committee: ten people from different countries and a president, elected by the national sections at a general assembly during the biennial IBBY congresses. They work on a voluntary basis. The daily management of IBBY's affairs is conducted from the IBBY secretariat in Basel, Switzerland.

The national sections are organized in many different ways and operate on national, regional, and international levels. In countries that do not have a national section, individual membership in IBBY is possible. The membership of the national sections include authors, illustrators, publishers, editors, translators, journalists, critics, teachers, university professors and students, librarians, booksellers, social workers, and parents. Annual dues from the national sections are IBBY's only source of regular income. Independent financing is necessary to support IBBY activities.

As a non-governmental organization with an official status in UNESCO and UNICEF, IBBY has a policy-making role as an advocate of children's books. IBBY is committed to the principles of the Convention on the Rights of the Child, ratified by the United Nations in 1990. One of its main proclamations is the right of the child to a general education and to direct access to information. IBBY worked to have the resolution include an appeal to all nations to promote the production and distribution of children's books.

IBBY also cooperates with many international organizations and children's book institutions around the world and exhibits at the Bologna Children's Book Fair and other international book fairs.

== Awards and activities ==
The Hans Christian Andersen Award is given biennially to an author and an illustrator whose complete works have made a lasting contribution to children's literature. The IBBY-Asahi Reading Promotion Award is given biennially to a group or institution whose activities are making a lasting contribution to reading promotion programmes, and the IBBY-iRead Outstanding Reading Promoter Award is given biennially to two individuals who are working to promote the expansion and development of children’s reading. IBBY also compiles an IBBY Honour List of recommended works for children by outstanding writers, illustrators and translators selected by the IBBY national sections. It is published biennially and first shown as an exhibition during the IBBY Congress.

Each year, an IBBY national section sponsors International Children's Book Day, held in the first week of April.

The IBBY-Yamada Fund supports projects for reading promotion, establishing libraries, teacher, librarian and parent training as well as workshops for writers, illustrators and editors of children's books. The IBBY Children in Crisis Fund was established in 2005 to help children affected by natural disasters, civil disorder or war. The fund seeks donations for projects that replace or create libraries/collections of appropriate children's books and provide bibliotherapy.

IBBY has established several collections of children's books, each with its own focus. The largest is the IBBY Collection of Books for Young People with Disabilities, located at the Toronto Public Library. Every two years, a selection of Outstanding Books for Young People with Disabilities is compiled and catalogued. The Silent Books collection is a collection of children's books without words, created as a response to the need for books on the Italian island of Lampedusa, the destination for many refugees fleeing North Africa and the Middle East. Together with the IBBY Honor List selection, these collections are available as exhibitions.

IBBY has also supported the creation of two virtual collections of children's books: Children's Books in Europe, a collection of books in European languages; and Books for Africa/Books from Africa, highlighting books published in African languages.

The Jella Lepman Medal was first awarded in 1991 to persons or institutions that have made a significant contribution to children's literature.

USBBY produces an annual USBBY Outstanding International Books List.

== Bookbird ==
Bookbird: A Journal of International Children's Literature (ISSN 0006-7377) is a refereed journal published quarterly by IBBY.

== See also ==
- IBBY Australia
- IBBY Canada
- USBBY
