= Annick Press =

Canadian book publishing company

- Founded: 1975
- Founder: Anne Millyard and Rick Wilks
- Country of origin: Canada
- Headquarters location: Toronto, Ontario
- Distribution: University of Toronto Press (Canada); Publishers Group West (United States)
- Publication types: Books
- Official website: www.annickpress.com

Annick Press is a Canadian book publishing company that was founded in Toronto, Ontario in 1975 by Anne Millyard and Rick Wilks. Rick Wilks became the sole owner in 2000. A second editorial office was opened in Vancouver by Colleen MacMillan in 1999. Annick Press publishes approximately thirty books of fiction and non-fiction for children and young adults per year.

Annick Press is a member of the Association of Canadian Publishers, the Organization of Book Publishers of Ontario, and IBBY Canada. It was recently made a part of the Canadian government's "Read Up On It" programme through Library and Archives Canada.

== Notable authors ==
- Priscilla Galloway, children's book author, winner of the Bologna Ragazzi award in 2000
- K.V. Johansen, winner of the Ann Connor Brimer Award
- Robert Munsch, a member of the Order of Canada and "Canada's best-selling author," who "sells more books than any other Canadian author every year".
- Bill Richardson, winner of the Stephen Leacock Medal for Humour in 1994
- Roslyn Schwartz, creator of the Mole Sisters books and television programme
- Kathy Stinson, creator of the Bare Naked Book originally published in 1986 and rerelased in 2021 with updated illustrations by Melissa Cho.

== Awards ==
- In 2014, The Man With the Violin, written by Kathy Stinson and illustrated by Dušan Petričić, won the TD Children's Literature Award
- In 2009, Mattland, written by Hazel Hutchins and Gail Hebert and illustrated by Dušan Petričić, won the Amelia Frances Howard-Gibbon Illustrator's Award from the Canadian Library Association
- Leslie's Journal by Allan Stratton was named to the American Library Association's "Best Books for Young Adults" booklist
