= USBBY =

American literary organization

The United States Board on Books for Young People (USBBY) is a national section of the International Board on Books for Young People (IBBY).

== History ==
The United States National Section of the International Board on Books for Young People, USBBY, was established in the early 1960s by the American Library Association (ALA) and the Children's Book Council (CBC). It was incorporated as “Friends of IBBY” in 1979 and was headquartered at the Children's Book Council in New York City at that time. The name was changed soon thereafter, and USBBY was hosted by theInternational Reading Association (IRA), now the International Literacy Association (ILA) in Newark, Delaware from 1985 until the end of 2008. From 2009 the USBBY Secretariat has been located at the Center for Teaching through Children's Books in Skokie, Illinois.

USBBY is chartered as a non-profit corporation serving to promote and develop excellence in books for children and young people. The structure of USBBY consists of a board of directors, with a president, president-elect, past president, treasurer, secretary, and 12 directors, plus the executive director. Members include librarians, teachers, university professors, authors, illustrators, publishers, and students. Membership categories range from individual, to organizational, and patron membership (currently the American Library Association, Children's Book Council, International Literacy Association, (then the International Reading Association) and National Council of Teachers of English).

USBBY's regular activities include: a biannual USBBY Newsletter, a biennial regional conference, and sessions at ALA, IRA, and NCTE annual conferences and the American Library Association Midwinter Meeting. USBBY committees recommend US nominees for the Hans Christian Andersen Award, the IBBY-Asahi Reading Promotion Award, and Outstanding Books for Young People with Disabilities, as well as for USBBY's own Bridge to Understanding Award that is presented annually.

== Organization ==
USBBY is governed by a board of directors that includes four elected and eight appointed board members who represent the USBBY membership as well as USBBY's patron organizations—the Children's Book Council, the American Library Association, the International Reading Association, and the National Council of Teachers of English. USBBY is managed by its board of directors, the USBBY general secretary, and a variety of member committees. The executive director (who is an ex officio non-voting member of the board) is the administrative officer of the organization.

The USBBY board of directors meets three times annually. The organization also convenes an annual meeting for its members, which is held either at the National Council of Teachers of English (NCTE) Annual Convention, or at the biennial IBBY Regional Conference. Specifics on the board's activities is available via the USBBY Manual online.

=== Current president of USBBY ===
- Susan Polos 2026–27

=== Past presidents of USBBY ===
- Diane Monson 1989
- Margaret McElderry 1990
- Amy Kellman 1991
- Dorothy Briley 1992
- Mary Lou White 1993
- Barbara Barstow 1994
- Shirley Haley-James 1995
- Helen Mullen 1996
- Joan Glazer 1997
- Rudine Sims Bishop 1998
- Carl Tomlinson 1999
- Betsy Hearne 2000
- Junko Yokota 2001
- Kathleen T. Horning 2002
- Judy O'Malley 2003
- Kent Brown 2004
- Susan Stan 2005
- Sylvia Vardell 2006
- Joan Atkinson 2007
- Linda M. Pavonetti 2008
- John Mason 2009
- Kathy Short 2010
- Barbara Lehman 2011
- Doris Gebel 2012
- Kathy East 2013
- Janelle Mathis 2014–15
- Therese Bigelow 2016–17
- Terrell Young 2018–19
- Evie Freeman 2020–21
- Tucker Stone 2022–23
- Wendy Stephens 2024–2025

== Awards and events ==
=== Outstanding International Books List ===
The Outstanding International Books (OIB) list was first started by USBBY in 2006 . The OIB list is intended to introduce American children to exceptional artists and writers from other countries, recognizing that books connect people who live in different places, during different times, or with different interests. All of the titles originated or were first published in a country other than the United States and were subsequently published or distributed in the U.S. These books not only represent the best in children's literature from around the globe, but also introduce American readers to other perspectives. The list is showcased each year in the February issue of School Library Journal. The goal is to create more awareness of, and demand for, books from other countries, so that US publishers will be encouraged to offer more books from diverse countries to young readers in America Their originality and appeal, and the quality of the presentations support most library collections of children's literature.

=== The Bridge to Understanding Award ===
The Bridge to Understanding Award formally acknowledges the work of adults who create programs that use children's books to explore cultures around the world in order to promote international understanding among children. Winning programs are based on a broad understanding of culture as ways of living and being in the world, and go beyond the surface features of a culture, such as food, fashion, folklore, famous people, and festivals.

This award was established in memory of Arlene Pillar, an educator who served USBBY as newsletter editor from 1984 until her death in 1990. Organizations eligible for the award include schools, libraries, scout troops, clubs, and bookstores. The program may be a one-time event, or an ongoing series of events, that serves children ranging in age from kindergarten through tenth grade. The award carries a monetary prize of $1000 and a certificate.

=== USBBY Special Projects Fund ===
In February 2007, the USBBY Board of Directors approved creating a Special Projects Fund to be used specifically to fund worthy projects, both domestic (U.S.) and foreign (IBBY related projects) that merit USBBY support. Applications are judged on urgency of the need, the quality of the proposed project, short term and long term benefits, and compatibility with IBBY and USBBY's mission and goals. No more than $4,000 will be awarded annually to any one project. The deadline for application submission is August 1 each year.

=== International Children's Book Day ===
In 2013, USBBY sponsored the poster design for IBBY's International Children's Book Day (ICBD). Illustrator Ashley Bryan and poet Pat Mora created the poster. In 2021, USBBY will again sponsor the poster design for the international event, this time featuring the poetry of Margarita Engle and the art of Hans Christian Andersen Medalist Roger Mello. The USBBY Secretariat maintains a blog with library programming ideas related to ICDL.

== Biennial Regional IBBY Conference ==
The biennial IBBY regional conference takes place in the fall of each off-numbered year. Organizing and hosting the conference is an opportunity to assume a leadership role in the field of children's literature and make connections with authors, illustrators and colleagues in support of USBBY's mission to promote international understanding through children's books.

=== Recent IBBY Regional Conference Locations ===
- 1995 Callaway Gardens, Georgia
- 1997 Albuquerque, New Mexico
- 1999 Madison, Wisconsin
- 2001 Burlingame, California
- 2003 Chautauqua, New York
- 2005 Callaway Gardens, Georgia
- 2007 Tucson, Arizona
- 2009 St. Charles, Illinois
- 2011 Fresno, California
- 2013 St. Louis, Missouri
- 2015 New York, New York
- 2017 Seattle, Washington
- 2019 Austin, Texas
- 2022 Nashville, Tennessee
- 2023 New York, New York

== Publications ==
=== Bridges ===
USBBY publishes Bridges, a semi-annual newsletter for its members that reports on conferences and co-sponsored sessions, as well as general news related to international literature for children and young adults. The editor considers email announcements, manuscripts, and press releases related to national and international children's literature. Deadline for submissions are Aug. 15 for the fall issue and Feb. 15 for the spring issue.

=== Bridges to Understanding Book Series ===
Bridges to Understanding is a series of annotated bibliographies of outstanding international literature for young people. The individual volumes are published by Scarecrow Press, a division of Rowman & Littlefield and include: Children's Books from Other Countries (1998) edited by Carl M. Tomlinson; The World Through Children's Books (2002) edited by Susan Stan; Crossing Boundaries with Children's Books (2006) edited by Doris J. Gebel; Envisioning the World through Children's Books (2011) edited by Linda Pavonetti; and Reading the world's stories : an annotated bibliography of international youth literature(2016) edited by Annette Y Goldsmith, Theo Heras, and Susan Corapi
