= Mistapew =

North American Indigenous spirit-being

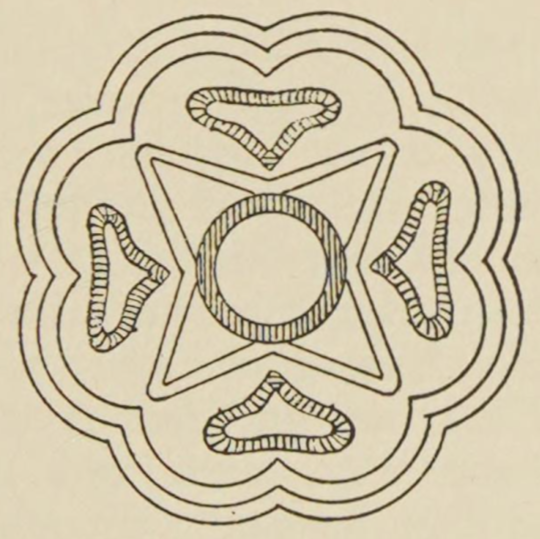
"Design representing a hunter's Great Man (mista´peo) on a beaded shot pouch (Ungava band)", drawn by Frank G. Speck.

Mistapew (Plains Cree mistâpêw, ᒥᐢᑖᐯᐤ, [ˈmɪs.tɑːˌpeːw], plural mistâpêwak) or (using the spelling system of Franz Boas) Mista´peo, also Mištapew, Mishtapew, is a spirit-being found widely in cultures across the Algonquinian Cree-Montagnais-Naskapi language continuum.

Evidence is patchy for beliefs about Mistapew before Indigenous cultures were profoundly affected by Euro-Canadian colonial cultures. Discussing the evidence for belief in a superior supernatural being among the East Cree—which includes beliefs about mistapew—John S. Long, Richard J. Preston, and Cath Oberholzer argued in 2006 that

the ethnographic fragments, gleaned from various sources and time periods, here underscore the difficulties inherent in reconstructing religious concepts from two such disparate points of view [Christian and traditional Indigenous]. Constraints imposed by barriers of language, diverse cultural world views and conflicting "missions" create a tangled web of misunderstandings and ambivalent behaviour.

Traditional beliefs about Mistapew are known to have changed during the twentieth century.

Stories of Mistapew are current in Indigenous North American traditional and popular culture in the twenty-first century.

== Etymology ==
Mistapew is a compound of the augmentative prefix misti- "big, great" and the noun nâpêw "man", thus meaning "big man" (using Plains Cree forms).

== In Innu and Naskapi cultures ==
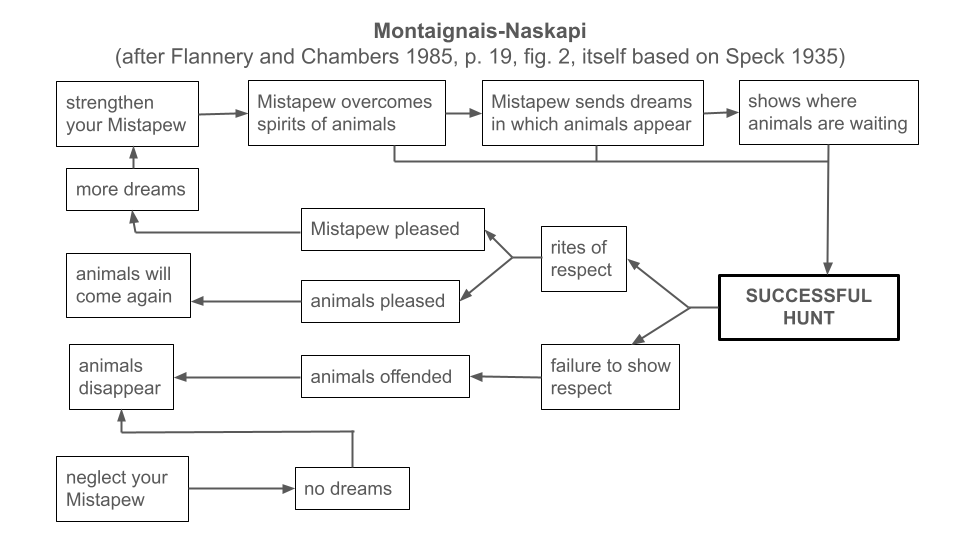
Montaignais-Naskapi ideas of Mistapew's role in hunting, based on Speck 1935.

According to the anthropologist Frank Speck, in a 1935 publication of his then-recent fieldwork, in Innu and Naskapi cultures, the word Mistapew denoted "the human soul in its animate, active state", and Speck reported that "the hunter's success in avoiding sickness, in feeding his family, in prolonging his life, in building a good reputation among his friends, depends upon his bodily conduct in harmony with the positive requirements or the negations of his Great Man".

Regina Flannery later represented the role of Mistapew in ideas about hunting, as reported by Speck, using a flow-diagram (see figure).

Noting that, in some stories, Mistapew can eat humans, Speck perceived some similarity between the Mistapew and Witigo.

== In East Cree cultures ==
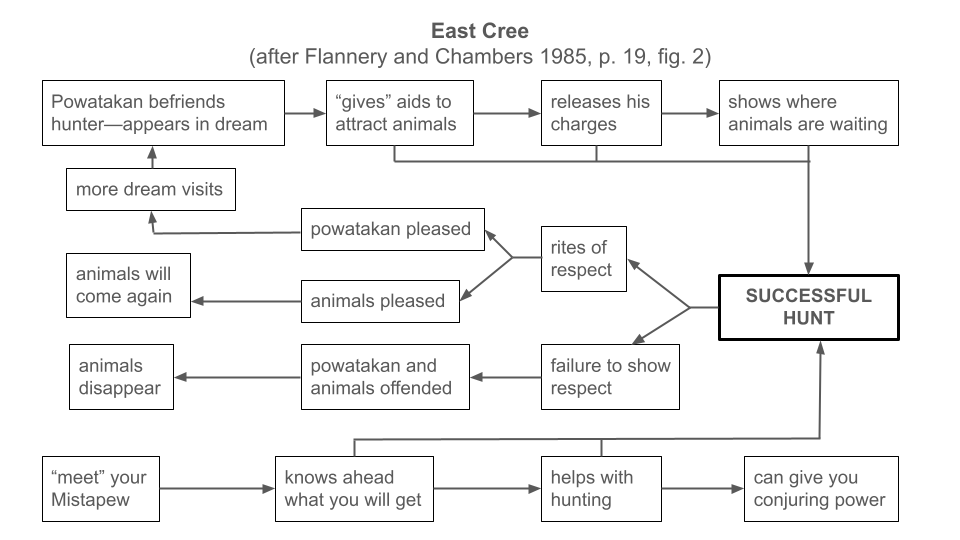
East Cree ideas of Mistapew's role in hunting.

Regina Flannery undertook fieldwork in the 1930s and 1940s among the East Cree-speaking cultures of James Bay, specifically in Waskaganish (known to Flannery as Rupert House), Eastmain, Fort George and Mistassini. This research led her to a detailed report of what Mištapew meant in those communities at that time.

Flannery found that in these cultures, Mištapew was not a hunter's own spirit, but spirit ally whom the hunter might encounter and seek wisdom from. Whereas other spirit-beings (powatakanak) might visit the hunter in dreams, the hunter would encounter Mištapew while awake.

Mištapew featured prominently in the shaking tent ceremony, one of whose functions was to provide divinatory information about hunting. In this ceremony, the ritual specialist would enter a small, specially constructed tent, while his audience would sit outside. The person in the tent was to kneel silently while visited by spirits. One of the men interviewed by Flannery, Edward Nemegus, said that "when the conjuror conjures he is supposed to turn into Mištapew, to get the spirit of Mištapew". While in the tent, Mištapew would then be visited by powatakanak; the tent would shake as each spirit entered and departed. The role of Mistapew in the ceremony was to be the host or master of ceremonies, introducing the spirits and conveying and interpreting their messages. Once he had left, the audience would fetch the ritual specialist out of tent.

The role of Mistapew in the shaking-tent ceremony was represented by a myth which Flannery recorded from a number of community members. In it, a man called Čowa attempts the shaking tent ceremony for the first time ever. Mištapew visits him, tells him that he will soon kill and cook a beaver, but says that he must not feed it to his children. The prophecy proves true, but the man feeds beaver to his children. He subsequently has poor luck in hunting. When he is on the point of starvation, he sees tracks in the snow, and follows them to a tent where he meets Čičimištapew (Big Mištapew or Old, Old Mištapew), his son Mištapew, Mištapew's son Mištapeš, and the chiefs of the different kinds of animals. Čowa's wife, who has caught and cooked a porcupine, brings it to the tent and offers it to the inhabitants. The next day, Čowa is admonished for not following Mištapew's instructions, and is taught skills in hunting and preparing food. Finally, Čičimištapew explains that "Now we are going to leave you. You see how it is. Suppose another man plays the Shaking Tent, and if he doesn't do what he is told to do when they talk to him, he will starve just as you did." According to Flannery and Chambers, "in the 1930s, the Čowa story, as oral literature, had meaning for the Cree on two levels. As an explanation of 'how we learned to conjure,' it described the archetypal conjuring lodge; as a moral lesson, it taught that one must believe what he hears in the conjuring tent and must follow the instructions of Mištapew".

By the 1960s, the ways of life of James Bay Cree-speakers had changed dramatically, and people no longer relied on hunting for subsistence. In the view of Flannery and Chambers, beliefs in powatakanak fell away, but the idea of Mištapew lasted, with the term being extended to cover "the general notion of 'spirits' believed in by the Cree but not the Whites".

== In Swampy Cree cultures ==
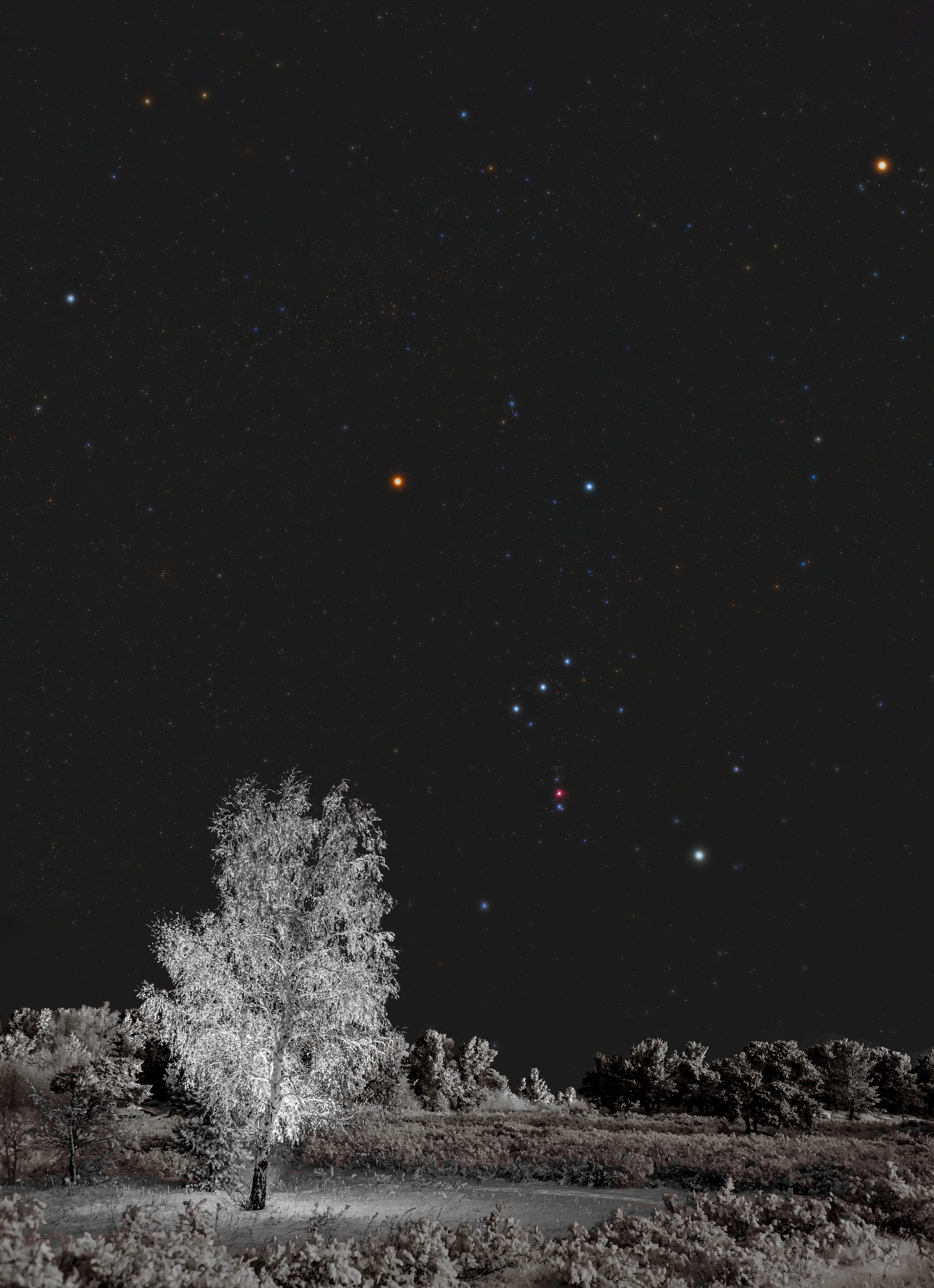
The constellation Orion against the backdrop of a birch tree in winter, photographed in Kazakhstan.

The Opaskwayak Cree elder Wilfred Buck reports a story naming the constellation classically known as Orion as Mistapew, telling that a giant enters the dreams of seven sleeping brothers in order to imprison their souls within stones. The brothers are freed by their nephew, who builds the first sweat lodge in order to release the souls; the sweat lodge is represented by the constellation classically known as Corona Borealis.

Reflecting in 2009 on his discovery of this and other traditional Cree stories about constellations, Buck comments that "as children, the stories of Orion the Hunter and The Great Bear were presented to our impressionable young minds as knowledge given from great cultures; no other alternative viewpoints were presented. Such experiences left me with the impression that my people were not smart enough to have such perspectives as those that can be associated with the heavens. [...] I now know this is not the case".

== In Plains Cree cultures ==
Leona Makokis's late twentieth-century interviews with Cree-speaking elders of the Saddle Lake First Nations reserve report seven laws handed down by the Creator, including:

Then, the fourth law is honesty. We are to lead honest lives. For whatever we do, we must do in complete honesty with ourselves and others. This keeps our heart, mind, and spirit, full f integrity. The teacher of honesty has been the "Sabe" or "Mistapew" who dwells in the unseen aspects of our world. Sabe or Mistapew is often called "Bigfoot," a term that does not reflect on their being favorably. However, Mistapew is a kind, honest being that honors his relationships and adheres to this law. These beings are closely knit, have the ability to heal, and give freely of their powers when necessary.

== In the Rocky Mountains ==
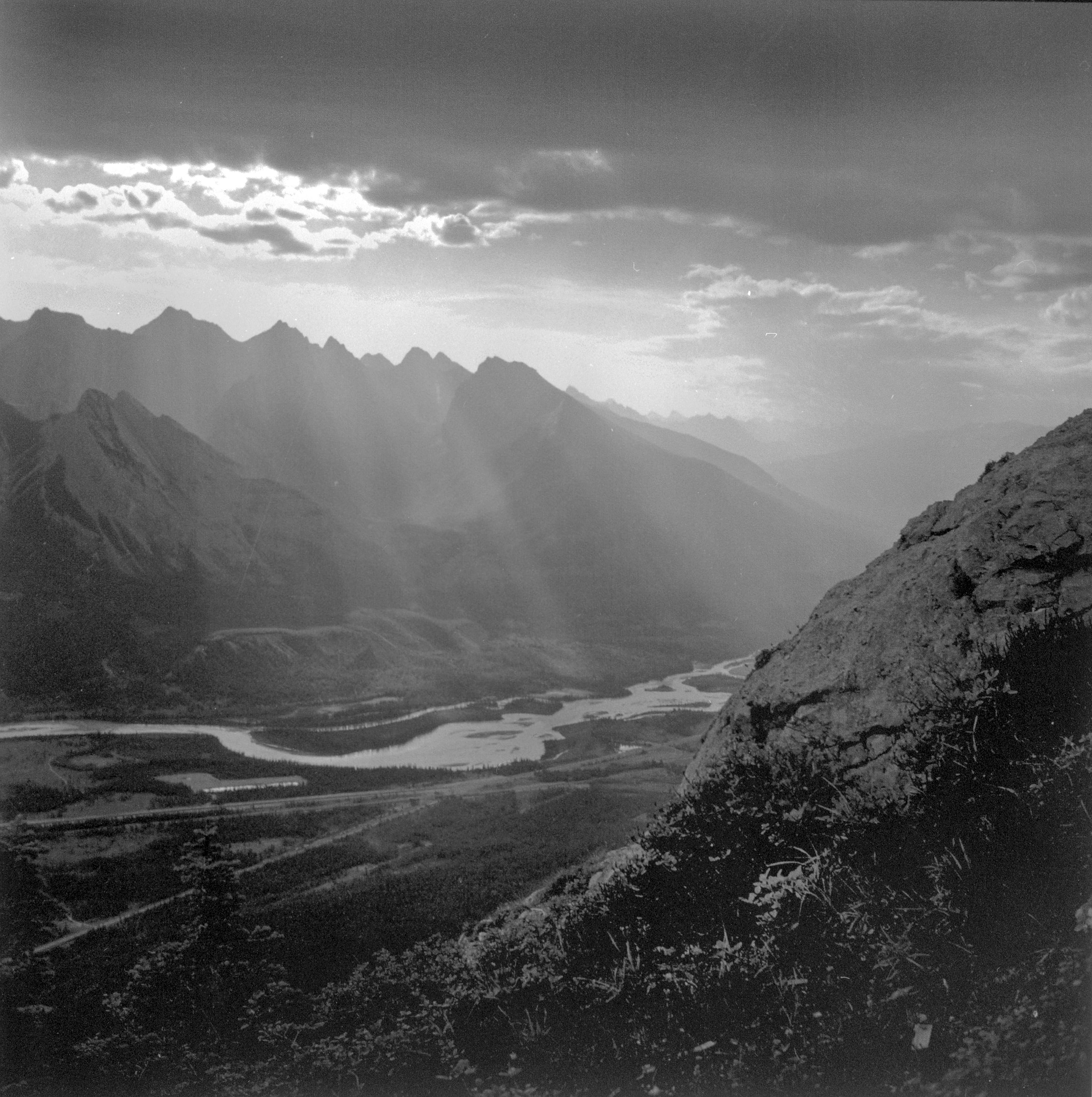
Sunburst over the Colin Range and Athabasca River, Jasper National Park. The mountain centre-left is known as Mistapew and thought to be the resting-place of a giant.

According to Joachim Fromhold, of the Asini Wachi Nehiyawak, at the western extreme of the extent of traditional Cree culture

Jasper, like Banff, is also the home of the MISTAPEW (MISTAHE NAPEW, "Giants" of legend, their resting places scattered throughout the montane and foothills region. [...] They are [...] generally seen as benevolent and the friends of mankind. At the time when spirits and mankind still walked the earth together, these were the offspring of the spirits and humanity. The giants were more-or-less overseers of the earth and guardians of mankind. During the first cycle of history the spirits walked the earth in earthly form. At the end of this cycle the spirits withdrew to the spiritual plane, but the Giants remained behind. In time they too withdrew from the living world, but instead of withdrawing to another plane they lay down and went to sleep. To some peope living today the outlines of these spirits can still be seen in natural features, such as the mountains, hills, horizon and other natural features. Tradition has it that the End Times, or end of this cycle, draws near when they once again allow themselves to be seen. Among the Mountain People there is a belief that more and more of the people are once again becoming aware of the MISTAPEW.

== Appearances in popular culture ==
Mistapew has become a significant figure in some Indigenous-authored fiction. Geneviève Mativat's 2003 Épit et le géant children's book features Mistapew as a central character. Mistapew is a prominent figure in David A. Robertson's Misewa Saga series of children's books, particularly the 2022 novel The Stone Child and the 2023 The Portal Keeper. In these books, the characters frequently refer to Mistapew as "Bigfoot" in English.

Norway House Parks and Recreation's ice hockey league is called the "Mistapew Cup".
