= Swampy Cree language =

Algonquian language spoken in Canada

Swampy Cree
- ᓀᐦᐃᓇᐍᐏᐣ / Nêhinawêwin
- Native to: Canada
- Region: Ontario
- Ethnicity: 2,800 (2007)
- Native speakers: 1,805 (2016 census)
- Language family: Algic: Algonquian; Cree-Montagnais-Naskapi; Cree; Swampy Cree

Language codes
- ISO 639-3: csw
- Glottolog: swam1239
- Linguasphere: 62-ADA-ac,
- Swampy Cree is classified as Vulnerable by the UNESCO Atlas of the World's Languages in Danger.

nêhinaw / ininîw "Indigenous person" / "human being"
- Person: W: nêhinaw ᓀᐦᐃᓇᐤ; E: ininîw ᐃᓂᓃᐤ
- People: W: nêhinawak ᓀᐦᐃᓇᐘᐠ; E: ininîwak ᐃᓂᓃᐘᐠ
- Language: W: nêhinawêwin ᓀᐦᐃᓇᐌᐎᐣ; E: ininîmowin ᐃᓂᓃᒧᐎᓐ; Hand Talk
- Country: W: nêhinawaskiy ᓀᐦᐃᓇᐘᐢᑭᐩ; E: ininîwaskiy ᐃᓂᓂᐗᔅᑭᔾ

Swampy Cree (variously known as Maskekon, Maskegon and Omaškêkowak, and often anglicized as Omushkego) is a variety of the Algonquian language, Cree. It is spoken in a series of Swampy Cree communities in northern Manitoba, central northeast of Saskatchewan along the Saskatchewan River and along the Hudson Bay coast and adjacent inland areas to the south and west, and Ontario along the coast of Hudson Bay and James Bay. Within the group of dialects called "West Cree", it is referred to as an "n-dialect", as the variable phoneme common to all Cree dialects appears as "n" in this dialect (as opposed to y, r, l, or ð; all of the phonemes are considered a linguistic reflex of Proto-Algonquian *r).

It had approximately 4,500 speakers in a population of 5,000 as of 1982 according to the 14th edition of the Ethnologue. Canadian census data does not identify specific dialects of Cree (all estimates now current rely on extrapolations from specific studies), and as of 2008 no accurate census of any Algonquian language existed.

The grammar and the examples used on this page are unless otherwise stated taken from Ellis's Second Edition (1983) of Spoken Cree.

== Dialects ==
A division is sometimes made between West Swampy Cree and East Swampy Cree.

Communities recognized as West Swampy Cree include Shoal Lake, The Pas, Easterville, Chemawawin Cree Nation, Grand Rapids Barren Lands, Churchill, Split Lake, York Factory, Fox Lake, Shamattawa, and God's Lake Narrows (all in Manitoba) and Fort Severn, Ontario.

Communities recognized as East Swampy Cree are Weenusk, Attawapiskat, Albany Post, Kashechewan, and Fort Albany (all in Ontario). The Cree spoken at Kashechewan also shows Moose Cree influence.

This page reflects the forms found in Albany Post (now Kashechewan).

== Phonology ==
=== Consonants ===
The consonant inventory for Swampy Cree contains 11 phonemes. A twelfth phoneme /l/ is not native but has entered the language via loanwords and influence from Moose Cree.

	Bilabial	Alveolar	Postalveolar	Velar	Glottal
Nasal	m ⟨m⟩	n ⟨n⟩			
Plosive	p ⟨p⟩	t ⟨t⟩		k ⟨k⟩	
Fricative		s ⟨s⟩	ʃ ⟨š⟩		h ⟨h⟩
Affricate		t͡s ⟨c⟩			
Semivowel	w ⟨w⟩		j ⟨y⟩		
Lateral		l ⟨l⟩ (Note: Loanwords)			

Voicing does not cause phonemic contrast in Swampy Cree. According to Ellis, however, stops often undergo voicing intervocalically when preceded by a stressed long vowel or nasal. For example, "māci" is pronounced [māːd͡zi], and "maci" is pronounced [mat͡si].

Preaspiration of stops creates a phonemic distinction. For example, pētāw (he brings it) is not the same as pēhtāw (he waits for it). However, in "many areas of Swampy Cree speech", /V(V)hC/ is becoming /VVC/; that is, /h/ is being lost before consonants, and if the preceding vowel is short then that vowel is lengthened.

In emphatic words that contain an initial vowel, [h] is often inserted before the vowel. It is not a phonemic distinction but simply an indicator of stress. Similarly, word-final vowels are often followed by moderate aspiration, which does not mark any change in meaning. Postaspiration is not phonemically distinctive either.

The consonant /h/ is occasionally pronounced as [j] (as in English "yes") intervocalically.

When a short vowel is dropped, leaving a nasal next to a stop, the nasal assimilates to the same place of articulation as the stop. For example, "nipāskisikan" becomes "mpāskisikan".

In words such as ocawāšimiša, the [c] is actually an underlying /t/, assimilated by preparation for the articulation of the two [š]. In fact, pronunciation with a [t] is perceived as baby talk.

In word-final position, /t/ becomes [š].

=== Vowels ===
	Short		Long	
	Front	Back	Front	Back
High (close)	i ⟨i⟩	u ⟨o⟩	iː ⟨ī⟩	oː ⟨ō⟩
Mid	a ⟨a⟩		eː ⟨ē⟩	oː ⟨ō⟩
Low (open)	a ⟨a⟩		aː ⟨ā⟩	

Vowels in Cree can experience a great deal of variation but remain one phoneme. Long /oː/ varies between [oː] and [uː]. Long /aː/ varies between approximately [æː] (as in "hat") and [ɑː] (as in "hall"). Short /i/ varies between [ɪ] and [ɛ]. Short /o/ varies between approximately [o] and [ʊ]. Short /a/ has the widest variation, from [æ] to [ʌ] and [ɛ] as well, when it proceeds the approximant [j].

==== Contractions ====
- /Cw/ + /i/ yields /Co/
- /aw/ + /i/ yields /aː/

=== Stress ===
Stress is not distinctive in Swampy Cree. In other words, there are no minimal pairs of words that are distinguishable only by stress. However, correct placement of stress is important to prounciation. In the analysis of Jean Okimāsis and Arok Wolvengrey, the underlying stress-system in Swampy Cree is like other Cree dialects: in words of two syllables, the primary stress falls on the final syllable; in words of three or more syllables, the primary stress falls on the antepenultimate syllable. However, since unstressed vowels are sometimes omitted, two-syllable words with the stress on the first syllable do occur in speech.

== Morphology ==
Swampy Cree is a polysynthetic language that relies heavily on verbs, so many things that would be expressed in English as nouns or adjectives are expressed as verbs. In fact, Swampy Cree has no adjectives at all. Instead, it has the intransitive form of verbs. For example, instead of saying "he is strong", in Cree, one says something like "he strongs".

=== Nouns ===
Nouns in Swampy Cree have both free and bound stems, the latter being used in combination with other morphemes. Compounds are common and can be formed from other nouns, verb stems, and particles.

Swampy Cree does not have gender in the Indo-European sense (masculine, feminine, and neuter). Rather, it differentiates between animate and inanimate (see Animacy). While no living things are within the "inanimate" class, there are some nonliving things (socks, kettles, stones, paddles, etc.) within the "animate" class.

==== Personal possessor prefixes ====
Possession is also expressed via affixation. The first- and second-person prefixes are the same as those for verbs.

	Singular	Plural
1st person	ni-......-(a)	ni-......-inām
2nd person	ki-........-(a)	ki-.....-iwāw
3rd person	o- ....... -(a)	o- ....... -iwāw(a)
Obviative	o- ....... -iliw	

There are groups of nouns that have a dependent stem and must occur with some sort of possessor. They include relatives, body parts, and things that are regarded in Algonquian tradition as extremely personal items, such as hunting bags. Possession is also occasionally marked by the suffix -im (known as the possessed theme), which appears inside the suffix for plurality when it occurs. The -(a) suffix is added when the possessed item is animate.

With plural nouns (as opposed to the possessors), the suffix -ak (for animate) or -a (for inanimate) is added after all other suffixes.

Obviative is marked on animate nouns with the suffix -a and on inanimate nouns with the suffix -iliw. Animate obviative nouns do not mark number, so it is unknown whether an obviative noun is singular or plural. Inanimate obviative nouns are marked for plurality. Surobviative nouns show neither the number of the noun itself nor the number of the possessor.

=== Pronouns ===
While person and possession are often expressed by affixation in Cree, there are separate personal pronouns, which are often used for emphasis.

		singular	plural
1st person	exclusive	nīna	nīnanān
1st person	inclusive	nīna	kīnanānāw (kīnānaw)
2nd person		kīna	kīnawāw
3rd person		wīna	wīnaww

==== Demonstratives ====
	Third Person				Obviative			
	animate		inanimate		animate		inanimate	
	singular	plural	singular	plural	singular	plural	singular	plural
This one	awa	ōko	ōma	ōho	ōho		ōmēliw	ōho
That one	ana	aniki	ani(ma)	anihi	anihi		animēliw	anihi
This/that selfsame	ē'ko (for ēwako)				~rarely occurs~			
Another one	kotak	kotakiyak	kotak	kotakiya	kotakiya		kotakīliw	kotakiya

There is a further distinction in the Fort Albany region between kotak ("another") and kotakīy ("another one of two").

=== Verbs ===
As stated above, Swampy Cree relies heavily on verbs to express many things that are expressed in other ways in languages like English. For example, noun incorporation is quite common in Cree.

Both transitive and intransitive verbs in Swampy Cree change their endings (and occasionally even their stems) depending on animacy. Intransitive verbs rely on the animacy of their subjects, while transitive verbs rely on the animacy of their objects.

There are multiple forms of the verbs. The Independent Order of the verb is the set of verb forms that are used in the main clause. The Conjunct Order consists of the forms used in other types of clauses. Also, Swampy Cree has suffixes for direct action as opposed to inverse. The labels refer not to the quality of the action but to which person is acting on which other grammatical person (see Direct–inverse alignment). For example, "I see him/her" (ni...wāpam...ā...w) is a direct action because the first person is acting upon the third and "He/she sees me" (ni...wāpam...ikw...w) because it is the third person acting upon the first. In Cree, the order of "directness" is second person, first person, third person.

Transitive Inanimate Verbs and Animate Intransitive Verbs also have the option of relational or non-relational forms. Relational forms are used when the verb is carried out in relation to another person. A famous example from the translation of the Pilgrim's Progress is kici-pēci-itohtē-w-ak, which comes from "evangelist bid me come hither" but literally translates to "that I come hither (in relation to him)".

Swampy Cree has two types of imperatives: Immediate Imperative and Future Imperative. As the name implies, the Immediate Imperative is for actions that should be carried out immediately, and the Future Imperative is for actions that should be carried out after a lapse of time.

==== Order of affixes ====
1) Person: There are two "subject" prefixes for Cree Verbs for first person (ni(t)-) and second person (ki(t)-). The third person is unmarked. The prefixes are used simultaneously with suffixes that express number, animacy, and transitivity.

2) Tense: Future tense is expressed by a prefix -ka- in the first and second person and ta- in the third person. The future tense marker is inserted after the person marker (if any). In casual speech, it is often contracted with the person marker (e.g., nika- becomes n'ka-).

3) Completed action is often expressed by a prefix kī- (in affirmative utterance) and ohci- (in negative utterances) and is commonly used to refer to the past. For example, itohtēw means "he goes (there)" but kī-itohtēw means "he went (there)".

4) Aspect

There is a potential prefix kī- (can, be able to) that precedes the root but follows both person and tense prefixes.

The prefix ati- indicates gradual onset (as opposed to sudden beginning).

4*) Some prefixes have more freedom in where they go, such as pēci- (in this direction, towards the speaker).

5) Location emphasis: When a locating expression is used at the beginning of a sentence, the verb contains a prefix iši- as a sort of emphasis and agreement (approximately "thus" or "so"). Ellis describes it as being approximately "At the store do you there work?" If the locating expression does not precede the verb, iši- is not used because it is a relative root (so it refers to something that precedes it in the phrase).

6) Root

7) Reciprocal action

Reciprocal action is expressed by the suffix -ito-, occurring between the stem and the normal inflection.

8) Inflectional suffix

9) Causative: The causative suffix -hēw can be added to verbs in order to change it to a causative verb. For example, itohtēw means "he goes there", and ihotahēw means "he takes him there".

==== Animate intransitive verbs ====
Animate intransitive verbs are intransitive verbs that have an animate subject.

Independent Indicative
		singular	plural
1st person	exclusive	-n	-nān
1st person	inclusive	-n	-nānaw
2nd person		-n	-nāwāw
3rd person		-w	-wak
Obviative		-liwa	
indefinite, passive		-(nā)niwan	

Conjunct Indicative
		singular	plural
1st person	exclusive	-(y)ān	-(y)āhk
1st person	inclusive	-(y)ān	-ahk
2nd person		-(y)an / -yin	-(y)ēk
3rd person		-t / ~k	-cik/ ~kik (-twāw / ~kwāw)
Obviative		-lici	
indefinite, passive		-(nā)niwahk	

Conjunct Subjunctive
		singular	plural
1st person	exclusive	-(y)ānē	-(y)āhkē
1st person	inclusive	-(y)ānē	-ahkwē
2nd person		-(y)anē / -yinē	-(y)ēkwē
3rd person		-tē / ~kē	-twāwē / ~kwāwē
Obviative		-litē	
indefinite, passive		-(nā)niwahkē	

Imperative
	non-relational		relational	
	singular	plural	singular	plural
2nd person		-k	-w	-wāhk
Inclusive We	-tā(k) / -tāw		-wātā(k)	

==== Inanimate intransitive verbs ====
These verbs are often the equivalent of the English construction that begins with the empty subject "it" (e.g., it is raining, it is snowing, it is day, it is poison, etc.):

- tahk (cold) → tahkāyāw (it is cold)
- tipisk (night) → tipiskāw (it is night)
- kīšik (sky) → kīšikāw (it is day)

Some of the elements, such as tahk-, cannot stand on their own, but others are free morphemes, such as kīšik.

First and second person never appear in this context, leaving only the third person and obviative forms.

Independent Indicative
	singular	plural
3rd person	-w	-wa
Obviative	-liw	-liwa

Conjunct Indicative
	singular	plural
3rd person	~k	~ki (~kwāw-)
Obviative	-lik	-liki (~likwāw-)

Conjunct Subjunctive
	singular	plural
3rd person	~kē	~kwāwē
Obviative	-like	~likwāwē

==== Transitive animate verbs ====
Transitive animate verbs whose object is animate, but not all nouns that are part of the "animate" gender are animate in the traditional sense of the word. For example, "wharf" is animate. The distinction between "transitive" and "intransitive" in Cree is not the same as in English. For example, thinking and coughing always take an object (itēlihtam "he thinks (it)" and ostostotam "he coughs (it)").

Independent Indicative

	Third person singular		Third person plural		Obviative		Surobviative	
	singular	plural	singular	plural	singular	plural	singular	plural
First Person	-āw	-ānān	-āwak	-ānānak	-(i)māwa	-(i)mānāna / -ih	-	
Second Person	-āw	-āwāw	-āwak	-āwāwak	-(i)māwa	-(i)māwawa	-	
Inclusive We	-ānaw		-ānawak		-(i)mānawa		-	
indefinite, passive	-āw		-āwak		-(i)māwa		-	
Third Person	-				-ēw	-ēwak	-imēw	-imēwak
Obviative	-						-ēliwa	

Conjunct Indicative

	Third person singular		Third person plural		Obviative		Surobviative	
	singular	plural	singular	plural	singular	plural	singular	plural
First Person	-ak	-akiht	-akik	-akihcik	-(i)maki	-(i)mkihci	-	
Second Person	-at	-ēk	-acik	-ēkok	-(i)maci	-(i)mēko	-	
Inclusive We	-ahk		-akihcik		-(i)makihci		-	
indefinite, passive	-iht		-ihcik		-(i)michi		-	
Third Person	-				-āt	-ācik	-imāt	-imācik
Obviative	-						-ālici	

Conjunct Subjunctive

	Third person singular		Third person plural		Obviative		Surobviative	
	singular	plural	singular	plural	singular	plural	singular	plural
First Person	-akē	-akihtē	-akwāwē	-akihtwāwē	-(i)makē	-(i)makihtē	-	
Second Person	-atē	-ēkwē	-atwāwē	-ēkwāwē	-(i)matē	-(i)mēkwē	-	
Inclusive We	-ahkwē		-ahkwāwē		-(i)mēkwē		-	
indefinite, passive	-ihtē		-ihtwāwē		-(i)mihtē		-	
Third Person	-				-ātē	-ātwāwē	-imātē	-imātwāwē
Obviative	&nbs						-ālitē	

==== Transitive inanimate verbs ====
Transitive inanimate verbs are of basically two types: Type 1 are those with a stem that ends in a consonant (e.g., wāpaht-am → "he sees it") and Type 2 are those where the transitive inanimate stem end in a vowel. The verbs take the same endings as their animate intransitive counterparts (e.g., ayā-w → "she has it"). There are also verbs that some Algonquian linguists describe as "pseudo-transitive" verbs. Ellis groups them with Type 2 transitive inanimate verbs because they also function like transitive inanimate verbs while taking animate intransitive endings (e.g., wāpahtam sīpīliw "he sees the river").

Independent Indicative
		singular	plural
1st person	exclusive	-ēn	-ēnān
1st person	inclusive	-ēn	-ēnānaw
2nd person		-ēn	-ēnāwāw
3rd person		-am	-amwak
Obviative		-amiliwa	
indefinite, passive		-ikātēw	

Conjunct Indicative
		singular	plural
1st person	exclusive	-amān	-amāhk
1st person	inclusive	-amān	-amahk
2nd person		-aman	-amēk
3rd person		-ahk	-ahkik
Obviative		-amilici	
indefinite, passive		-ikātēk	

Conjunct Subjunctive
		singular	plural
1st person	exclusive	-amānē	-amāhkē
1st person	inclusive	-amānē	-amahkwē
2nd person		-amanē / -yinē	-amēkwē
3rd person		-ahkē / ~kē	-ahkwāwē / ~kwāwē
Obviative		-amilitē	
indefinite, passive		-ikātēkē	

Imperative
	non-relational		relational	
	singular	plural	singular	plural
2nd person	-a	-amok	-am	-amwāhk
Inclusive We	-ētā(k)		-amwātā(k)	

=== Particles ===
These are forms that are never inflected. Preverbal particles can be added to already-independent verbs in order to add meaning. Some particles can occur only as preverbal particles, others can occur only as independent words, and still others are preverbal with some verbs and independent with others:

- ohcitaw = purposely (always independent)
- pihci- = accidentally (always preverbal, dependent)
- wīpac = early, soon (always independent)
- pwāstaw = late (sometimes independent, sometimes dependent)

== Syntax ==
=== Conjunct order ===
Verbs in their conjunct form are the equivalent of English dependent clauses. One use of the conjunct form can be to express purpose. For example, Kī-pēc'-ītohtēw nā kici-otāpēt? ("Did he come to haul [wood]?)".

Verbs in their conjunct form occasionally have other types of morphemes. For example, the aspect markers are as follows: kā- = completed aspect/past time, kē- = future time, ē- = the verb in the dependent clause is going on at the same time as that in the main clause.

The negative particle used in Conjunct Order is ēkā.

==== Relative construction ====
Relative constructions are expressed by the completive aspect marker ka- with the verb in the Conjunct Order. For example, atāwēw ("he trades"), but kā-atāwēt ("the one who trades" → "a trader").

==== Indirect speech ====
While Cree prefers direct reported speech, it is possible to make indirect-speech constructions by using the aorist marker e- in addition to other aspect markers.

=== The Changed Conjunct ===
The Changed Conjunct alters the vowels of the first syllable of a verb as follows:

- i becomes ē
- a becomes ē
- o becomes wē
- ī becomes ā
- ē becomes iyē
- ā becomes iyā

It can be used to express the difference between Present General and Present-Time questions. It is the difference between "Do you speak Cree?" and "Are you speaking Cree?" in English. Present-Time questions use the prefix ka- without any vowel change. Present General questions use no prefix and change the vowel according to the paradigm above.

It can also be used in Vivid Narrative for effect, but it sounds outdated to modern-day speakers.

=== Grammatical cases ===
Swampy Cree nouns have three cases: nominative, vocative, and locative (sometimes referred to as "mention-case", "address-case", and "oblique case" respectively). The vocative case remains as a form distinct from the nominative only for a few words, such as nōhtā ("(my) father"). The locative case is expressed by the suffix -ihk, which means "in/at/on/to".

=== Questions ===
Yes/no questions are formed by adding the question marker nā to the first full word of the sentence: kimawāpin nā? "Are you visiting?" Tāpwē nā? "Really?"

Content questions use not nā but a special form of the verb. The structure of the sentence then reads: question word - predicate (in conjunct form). Because verbs in their conjunct form do not use prefixes but express the subject as part of the suffix, the form of the sentence can be described as Question word - Verb - (Object) - Subject (with VOS all one word).

=== Negation ===
The negative particle mōla is used before the person prefix of a verb and before any particles that directly modify and precede it: Mōla nikihtohtān. "I'm not going away." Mōla māskōc wīpac nētē nika-ihtān. "I shall probably not be there soon."

=== Indirect objects ===
In English, with verbs like "to give", "to show", "to lend", etc., it is often said that the verb takes a direct and an indirect object, and the recipient is the indirect object. In Cree, the recipient is considered the immediate object. The object being given is then moved over one more "slot". This fact is of importance especially when one deals with two third-person objects. In the sentence "John gave Mary the book", Mary would be in the third person, and the book would be in the obviative.

=== Verbs of being ===
The verb of being ihtāw ("he is") is only ever used in the context of "he is in some location". Equational sentences often require no verb, but the verbalizer -iw, with the stem vowel -i (animate) or -a (inanimate) and the inflectional -w (animate) or -n (inanimate), can be added to nouns in order to express "He/she/it is a something" or "He/she/it displays the characteristics of a something". For example, acimošiš ("puppy") + -iwiw = acimošišiwiw ("he is a puppy"), while cīmān ("boat/canoe") + -iwan = cīmāniwan ("it is a boat/canoe").

== Literature ==
Portions of the Bible were translated into Swampy Cree by Rev James Hunter and his wife Jean, who was a Cree speaker. The first publication, in Roman characters, was the Gospel of Matthew by James Hunter. This was published on the Church Mission Society mission press in 1853. This was followed by the First Epistle of John (Nistum Oo Mamowe Mussina̔humakāwin John) translated by Jean Hunter in 1855, who also translated many hymns. Most of these were reprinted by the British and Foreign Bible Society (BFBS) in London: the Book of Psalms (David Oo Nikumoona), the Gospel of Mark (Oo Meyo Achimoowin St Mark) and the Gospel of John (Oo Meyo Achimoowin St John) were published in 1876. Matthew (Oo Meyo Achimoowin St Matthew) was published in 1877. Further selections of Scripture, including the Psalms, were published in the Prayer Book which was published in 1877.

Author David Robertson published a Swampy Cree version of his book When We Were Alone. He also used Swampy Cree and inserted a glossary of the language in his book The Barren Grounds, which is part of The Misewa Series.

Author and poet jaye simpson writes in both English and Swampy Cree.
