= The Great Bear (novel) =

2021 book by David A. Robertson

- Author: David Robertson (writer)
- Language: English
- Series: The Misewa Saga
- Genre: Children's literature, Fantasy
- Publisher: Puffin Books
- Publication date: 28 September 2021
- Publication place: Canada
- Media type: Print (Hardcover and Paperback)
- Pages: 229
- ISBN: 9780735266131
- LC Class: 2020951757
- Preceded by: The Barren Grounds
- Followed by: The Stone Child

The Great Bear is a middle-grade children's book by David A. Robertson. Sequel to The Barren Grounds, it is the second volume in Robertson's Misewa Saga series.

The book was a finalist in the 2022 Silver Birch Fiction Award competition.

== Summary ==
The action opens in the otherworld village of Misewa, to which the protagonist Morgan and her foster-brother Eli have become regular visitors since the action of The Barren Grounds. As before, they enter the otherworld by pinning Eli's drawing of it up in the attic of their foster-home.

Soon after the start of the book, Morgan and Eli return reluctantly to this world, in time for the beginning of the school day. Morgan's foster-mother Katie gives Morgan the phone number for her birth-mother, Jenny Trout. Morgan is torn as to whether to contact her. At school, Morgan continues to develop her relationship with her new friend Emily, and the two learn that Eli is being made miserable by bullies. Amongst other things, the bullies taunt Eli for his long, braided hair. Eli cuts off his braid and Morgan tries to support Eli, but the bullying continues.

Missing their Misewa friend Ochek, who died in The Barren Grounds, the foster-siblings decide to return to Misewa earlier in history, so that they can see Ochek again. They pretend to be ill to get the day off school and, agreeing not to reveal information about the future, they meet a teenage Ochek. They learn that the North Lands are terrorised by a huge bear, Muskwa. Morgan and Eli are surprised, because in their time Muskwa is a wise and revered elder.

After settling into Misewa, Morgan and Eli go with Ochek and his father Mihko to visit their trapline. The journey is interrupted, however, when they encounter Muskwa. Morgan confronts Muskwa, hoping to befriend him, but he knocks her out. Ochek, Mihko, and Eli attack Muskwa to save her and although they do not greatly harm the bear, he moves on. Once Morgan is sufficiently recovered, the four hurry to the village of Otakosík, which they fear Muskwa is about to plunder. Sure enough, they find it in flames, abandoned by its inhabitants. They are joined by one of the animals fleeing Otakosík, the squirrel Arik, and hurry to Misewa to warn its inhabitants, successfully sneaking past a sleeping Muskwa.

Emboldened by Morgan's attempt to talk to Muskwa, the heroes propose that rather than fleeing as usual, Misewa's residents stand up to Muskwa. Seven warrior birds, led by Pipisché, a robin with a white breast, agree to help the heroes defend the village. Muskwa arrives, and is visibly unnerved by the prospect of resistance. Led by the birds, the heroes attack Muskwa and defeat him, inflicting potentially fatal wounds. The robin's white chest is made red with blood, implicitly explaining robins' red breasts. They explain to Muskwa that they would have been willing to share their food if he had not simply taken it. Fearing death, Muskwa asks for forgiveness. The heroes bring Muskwa back to Misewa, where Mihko's wife Nikamon nurses him back to health. Muskwa decides to join Misewa's community.

As they return to the Great Tree, the portal from the otherworld back to their foster-parents' attic, Morgan and Eli realise that someone else has entered the otherworld through their foster-parents' attic. They realise that it must be Mason, a man employed to renovate their foster-parents' attic, and that they have inadvertently set in train the events of The Barren Grounds. They give Ochek and Arik the information that those two will need for the events of The Barren Grounds to unfold, and return to the attic.

Back in our world, Morgan and Eli return to school, where they face Eli's bullies, rallying other children to scare the bullies away.

Morgan attempts to phone her mother, but the phone is answered by Morgan's grandmother, who informs her that Jenny Trout is dead.

In sorrow, Morgan and Eli return to Misewa, sleeping by the Great Tree. Morgan wakes to find Eli catatonic, and realises that his spirit has been stolen by the giant that haunts the forest where the Great Tree lies: Mistapew. She plunges into the forest in the hope of saving her foster-brother.

The book includes a glossary of Cree words used within.

== Inspirations ==
The book is based on a traditional Cree story relating to what in Classical terminology are the Great Bear and Corona Borealis constellations. Robertson learned the story at least partly from Wilfred Buck's Tipiskawi Kisik: Night Sky Star Stories. The story tells that a marauding bear was chased from the land by seven birds so swiftly that all end up in the heavens. The robin is mortally wounded, and the blood on its chest is the origin of robins' red breasts. In the Swampy Cree dialect, the constellation formed by the bear is called Mista Muskwa ("the big bear"), and the one formed by the birds is called Tehpakoop Pinesisuk ("the Seven Birds") and corresponds to the Classical constellation Corona Borealis.

== Reception ==
Kirkus Reviews took the view that Robertson's "nods at the complexity of time-travel plots serve as wry metafictive commentary" and that the book also constitutes a "consideration of profound existential questions". Correspondingly, Betsy Farquhar found the book "a heavier, edgier read" than The Barren Grounds. Karl Hele, however, concluded that "The Great Bear [...] is not as complex or compelling as Barren Grounds, yet it delivers a good modern Indigenous story".

Farquhar noted that both The Barren Grounds and The Great Bear were gender-normative, and commented that "it's a delight to find engaging books about Native cultures that are good stories on their own and not merely historical fiction. [...] Readers will learn some Cree words and customs, but the stories are quest adventures, not merely stories to teach a point. That being said, the books clearly portray Indigenous culture as more sustainable and kind than white culture (which may or may not be true, depending on the particular cultures in play)". Hele argued that "The novel offers lessons on the importance of community, the effects of bullying and how to overcome bullying, the importance of Cree traditions and language, the impact of the foster care system on Indigenous children, as well as a growing understanding of the importance of relationship based on respect, love, and caring in creating a vision of 'all my relations'".

Debbie Reese argued that "The Great Bear functions as a good mirror for children like Morgan and Eli, and for children who are Cree, and for children who are Native". Joanne Peters found that Morgan and Eli show character development and growing happiness and confidence, implicitly because their time in Misewa facilitates recuperation from their traumatic life-experiences.

=== Book ban ===
In April 2022, the District School Board of Durham, Ontario ordered The Great Bear to be withdrawn from school classrooms and classes for reasons that were not made clear. The decision "sparked significant backlash" and the book was reinstated by the Board later that month.
