= The Barren Grounds =

2020 book by David A. Robertson

- Author: David Robertson (writer)
- Language: English
- Series: The Misewa Saga
- Genre: Children's literature, Fantasy
- Publisher: Puffin Books
- Publication date: September 8, 2020
- Publication place: Canada
- Media type: Print (Hardcover and Paperback)
- OCLC: 1225150679
- Followed by: The Great Bear

The Barren Grounds is a middle-grade children's book by David A. Robertson, published September 8, 2020 by Puffin Books. It is the first volume in Robertson's Misewa Saga series. The publisher has named it a juxtaposition between traditional Indigenous stories and C.S. Lewis's The Chronicles of Narnia.

== Summary ==
The novel's focal character is Morgan, an Indigenous girl who has been in foster-care in Winnipeg since the age of three and is now in grade 8 (13–14 years old). She is two months into her probably seventh foster-placement, with Katie (a teacher) and James (a doctor). Morgan is clever and witty and likes Fantasy fiction, but she is mistrustful and angry. The novel hints that Morgan finds Katie and James more congenial than previous foster-parents, but she struggles to invest in a relationship with them.

The foster-home has recently been joined by Eli, a year younger than Morgan. This is Eli's first foster-placement; he has hitherto lived in an Indigenous community, and can speak Cree. Eli says little but likes drawing in a sketchpad.

The first third of the novel focuses on Morgan's life in her foster-home and at school. She responds with rage when James tries to cheer her up by arranging her breakfast to make a smiley face. As Morgan walks Eli to school, he drops his sketchpad and it is run over by traffic, ruining it. Morgan's English Language Arts teacher, Mrs. Edwards, praises the technical achievement of a poem Morgan has written but asks her to rewrite it with more heart. On the other hand, Morgan is befriended by Emily, a White hockey-player who acquires a new sketchpad for Eli.

Morgan starts to take an interest in Eli's drawing, discovering that he draws scenes inspired by traditional Indigenous story. Morgan shows Eli Katie and James's attic. There they discover that one of Eli's drawings is a portal into the world he has drawn, but their realisation is interrupted by dinner. It turns out that Katie and James are celebrating Morgan's two-month anniversary in their home, and trying to help her connect with her Indigenous heritage. Morgan enjoys the traditional food they have bought but when Katie gives her a pair of moccasins, she flees upstairs in anger.

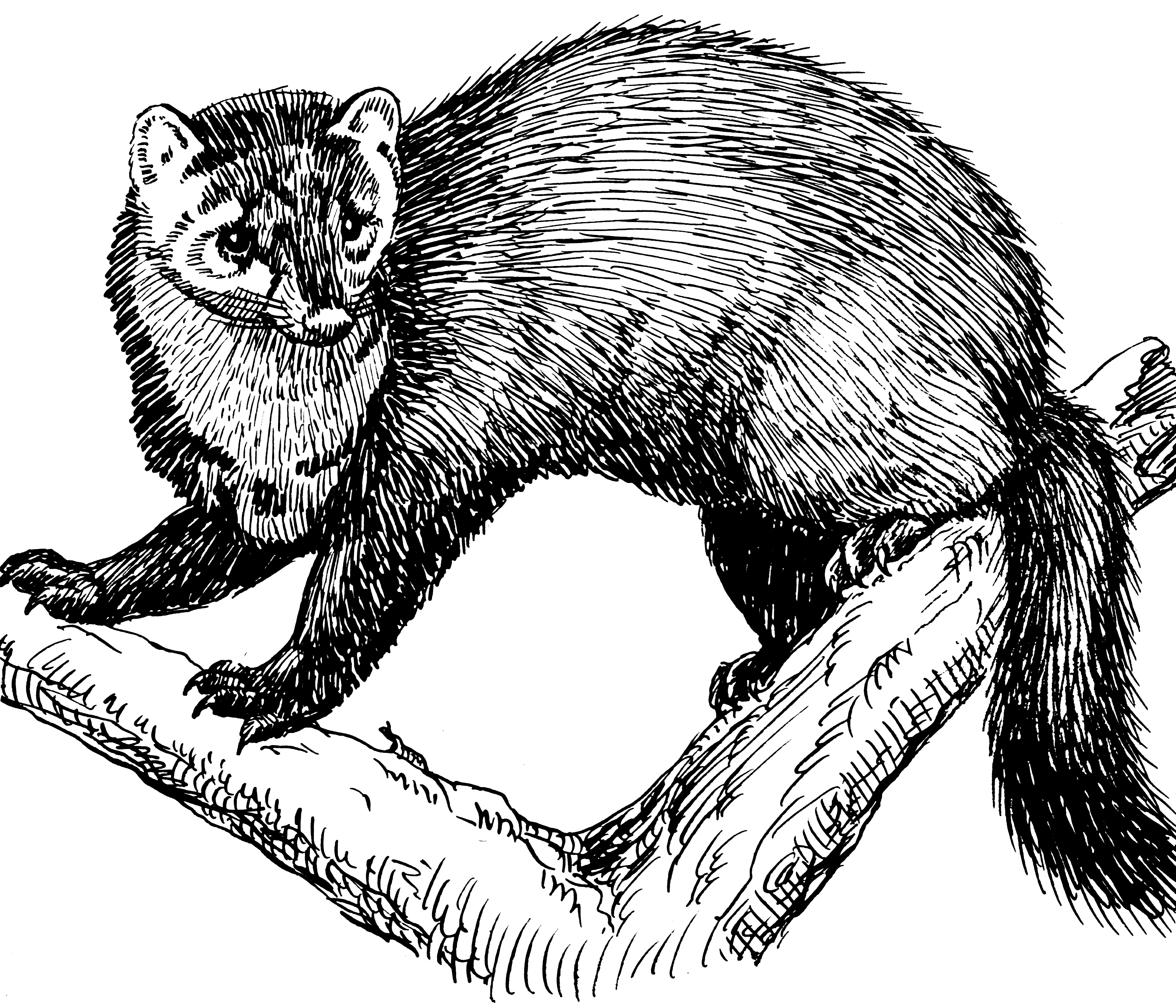
A fisher (Pekania pennanti)

Morgan wakes in the night and realises that Eli has passed through the portal. She follows him, emerging from a hole in a large tree into a snowbound land. She is found and rescued by Ochek, a human-sized, walking, talking fisher. Ochek, who has already found Eli, takes Morgan to his village. Morgan discovers that she is in the world of Askí and that time moves much faster than on Earth. Ochek's region, the North Lands, has been plunged into perpetual winter by a White man (later named as Mason) who came through a portal and stole the "summer birds", preventing the seasonal return of the "Green Time". Misewa is now close to starvation.

Ochek takes Morgan and Eli on a hunting trip. They find a sassy talking squirrel, Arik, stealing from one of Ochek's traps. Ochek tries to kill her for food, but the children prevent him, and Arik reveals that she knows where the summer birds are. With the permission of Misewa's council, Ochek, Arik, and the children set off to find the birds. They arrive at a chain of mountains to the west, where a wolf, Mahihkan, who works for Mason warns them not to cross. The heroes ascend the mountains anyway; the wolf attacks their camp at the summit but they defeat him and spare his life.

The heroes find that the Green Time persists on the other side of the mountains, but as they proceed towards Mason's house they realise that there are no animals there either, and surmise that Kisémanitou (the Creator) has withdrawn them to punish the man. They successfully steal the birds from Mason's house and head for Misewa, but he pursues them. He catches up with the heroes on the mountain summit; Ochek successfully climbs a sequoia tree and releases the birds, but falls from the tree, his tail broken by an arrow. Kisémanitou intervenes, turning Ochek into a constellation (Ochekatchakosuk, corresponding to the Big Dipper) for his services.

Arik, Morgan and Eli continue to flee Mason and are saved by Mahihkan; in their struggle, Mahihkan and Mason plunge into a deep canyon.

The heroes return to Misewa, where summer and prosperity have returned. Promising to return to Askí, Morgan and Eli head home through the portal, where they arrive just in time for school. Katie is pleased to see that Morgan is wearing her moccasins.

Throughout the novel, Morgan's memories of being taken away from her mother gradually return, and she writes a poem based on this process of recuperation that satisfies Mrs. Edwards.

== Reception ==
The Barren Grounds was a CBC Books number one bestseller for children's books for six nonconsecutive weeks, and remained on the list for over a year following publication.

The book was well received by critics, including a starred review from Kirkus Reviews, who highlighted how the novel "deftly and compellingly centers Indigenous culture". Joanne Peters, writing for CM Magazine, "highly recommended" the novel and called it "an amazing book, pulling together diverse strands of ageless mythic traditions and contemporary stories of children who traverse portals in which other times and other worlds intersect." Peters further highlighted how the book "is rich in its characterization, evocative in its descriptions, and skillful in its weaving together of traditions of the past and life in the present." According to Publishers Weekly, "the humans’ and animals’ voices are somewhat homogenous". Despite this, they found that "the treatment of Cree culture resonates, and the engaging characters and folklore ensure readers will look forward to the next installment."

CBC Books and Quill & Quire named The Barren Grounds one of the best books for young people in 2020. NPR's Code Switch team named it one of five underappreciated books published in 2020.

Awards and honors for The Barren Grounds
Year	Award/Honor	Result	Ref.
2020	Governor General's Literary Award for Young People's Literature	Finalist	
2020	USBBY Outstanding International Books List	Selection	
2021	Silver Birch Fiction Award	Finalist	
2021	Forest of Reading	Nominee	
2021	Canadian Children's Book Centre Book Awards	Shortlist	

== Adaption ==
On October 7, 2021, Robertson announced that ABC Signature had bought film rights to the Misewa Saga series.

== Sources and inspirations ==
Both Robertson and academic commentators have presented The Barren Grounds as an Indigenising rewrite of C. S. Lewis's Fantasy classic The Lion, The Witch and the Wardrobe. Ochek and Arek's quest to regain the summer birds is, however, an adaptation of a traditional story from Cree culture about the origin of the constellation Ochekatchakosuk, known in Anglophone culture as the Big Dipper, which Robertson learned from Murdo Scribe, a north-Manitoban elder, and from Wilfred Buck's Tipiskawi Kisik: Night Sky Star Stories. In Robertson's assessment, "Ochekatchakosuk shares this message: if you take too much from the land, there are consequences".

The book makes extensive use of Cree vocabulary. From the paperback edition onwards, copies included a glossary and pronunciation guide, which Robertson also published online.
