= Tipiskawi Kisik: Night Sky Star Stories =

2018 book by Wilfred Buck

Tipiskawi Kisik: Night Star Stories
- Author: Wilfred Buck
- Language: English
- Genre: Science
- Publisher: Manitoba First Nations Education Resource Centre
- Publication date: 2018
- Publication place: Canada
- Media type: Print
- Pages: 25
- ISBN: 9781927849460

Tipiskawi Kisik: Night Star Stories is a 2018 collection of eight origin-myths for constellations collected and retold by the Opaskwayak Cree Nation educator Wilfred Buck, and illustrated by Edwin Bighetty, Annette Lee, and William Wilson.

In 2023, Buck published a book described on its blurb as "the second edition of Tipiskawi Kisik" under the title Kitcikisik (Great Sky): Tellings That Fill the Night Sky, illustrated by Mistawasis Buck.

== Content ==
The book is adapted, for children, from Buck's 2009 academic article "Atchakosuk: Ininewuk Stories of the Stars". Cree-language words in the publication are given in the Swampy Cree dialect. Constellations discussed partly correspond to the classical constellations Ursa Minor, the Northern Cross, Cepheus, Ursa Major, Corona Borealis, and Orion.

== Reception ==
The work was listed as a bestseller by the Calgary Herald in March 2020 and included in the non-fiction section of Hamilton Review of Books' Independently Published Bestsellers List published in June 2023. The author David A. Robertson has cited the collection as a significant influence on his Misewa Saga series of children's novels.
