= Annette S. Lee =

American astrophysicist, educator, and artist

Annette S. Lee is a Native American astrophysicist and professional artist. Lee is the director of Native Skywatchers, a program created to record, map, and share Indigenous star knowledge. She is mixed-race Lakota and works with Ojibwe, Dakota and Lakota communities to preserve those cultures' astronomical and ecological knowledge.

== Background and education ==
Lee is mixed-race Lakota from the Wanbli Luta (Red Eagle) family and is closely associated with Ojibwe communities in Minnesota. Lee is married to fellow artist and Native Skywatcher member, William Wilson.

Lee has two bachelor's degrees, one from the University of California, Berkeley in Applied Mathematics (1992) and another from the University of Illinois at Urbana–Champaign in Art (1998). She went on to earn two master's degrees, a Master of Fine Arts from Yale University in 2000, with a focus on painting, and a Master of Science in Astrophysics from Washington University in 2008. She earned her Ph.D. in physics and astronomy at the University of Western Cape in 2020.

== Career ==
Lee launched the Native Skywatchers initiative in 2007. The project works to revitalize the star lore and astronomical and ecological knowledge of Indigenous cultures, including the sustainable engineering and agriculture practiced by North American native peoples. Lee and her collaborators, including Jim Rock, William Wilson, and Carl Gawboy, consult with Indigenous cultural experts to create star maps, constellation guides, and educational curricula. Native Skywatchers organizes in-person workshops and symposia which bring together scientists, students, community members, and Indigenous knowledge keepers. Lee's paintings are an important part of the Native Skywatchers project, illustrating constellations from Ojibwe and D/Lakota cultures. The Native Skywatchers initiative received a Next Gen STEM grant from NASA's Office of STEM Engagement to fund a series of seasonal virtual sessions for K–12 students from October 2020 to April 2021.

Along with indigenous astronomer Wilfred Buck, Lee curated the "One Sky, Many Astronomies" exhibit at Ottawa's Canada Science and Technology Museum, featuring constellations of Canada's indigenous cultures. A traveling exhibit, "One Sky, Many Worlds: Indigenous Voices in Astronomy," includes Lee as one of the principal curators.

In 2014 Lee was the Olga J. and G. Roland Denison Visiting Professor of Native American Studies at Central Michigan University. Lee was the 2018/2019 AIA Webster Lecturer for the Archaeological Institute of America. She was a Shapley Lecturer at the American Astronomical Society and is currently an Honorary/Adjunct Associate Professor at the University of Southern Queensland's Centre for Astrophysics. Lee was a keynote speaker at the International Dark-Sky Association 2020 Global Conference.

Until 2020, Lee was an Associate Professor of Physics and Astronomy at St. Cloud State University where she taught courses including Indigenous Astronomy, Astronomy Education Research (AER), and the History & Philosophy of Science.

In 2021, Lee won the AAAS Early Career Award for Public Engagement in Science for her community education efforts in teaching Indigenous knowledge of the stars.

== Selected publications ==
- Ojibwe Sky star map constellation guidebook : an introduction to Ojibwe Star knowledge / Annette S. Lee, William Wilson, Jeff Tibbetts, Carl Gawboy (2014). ISBN 9780615986784
- D(L)akota Star map constellation guidebook : an introduction to D(L)akota Star knowledge / Annette S. Lee, Jim Rock, Charlene O'Rourke (2014). ISBN 9780692232545
- Gaye giin giganawaabamin / original concept & original artwork by Annette S. Lee, written in Ojibwa by Rose Tainter, Mary Hermes & Annette S. Lee, translation by Rose Tainter & Mary Hermes (2015). ISBN 9781936115112
- The forever sky / Thomas Peacock; illustrations by Annette S. Lee (2019). ISBN 9781681340982
