= Sugar Falls =

2012 graphic novel by David Robertson

- Author: David Robertson (writer)
- Language: English
- Genre: Graphic novel
- Publisher: HighWater Press
- Publication date: January 22, 2012
- Publication place: Canada
- Media type: Print

Sugar Falls: A Residential School Story is a young adult graphic novel written by David A. Robertson, illustrated by Scott B. Henderson and Donovan Yaciuk, and published January 22, 2012 by HighWater Press.

The book "is based on the true story of Betty Ross, Elder from Cross Lake First Nation."

== Reception ==
Sugar Falls received positive reviews from CM: Canadian Review of Materials, CBC Books, and Anishinabek News. The book was also shortlisted for the First Nation Communities READ Award (2012).
