= On the Trapline =

2021 children's book by David Robertson

- 2021 hardcover edition
- Author: David A. Robertson
- Illustrator: Julie Flett
- Language: English
- Genre: Children's literature
- Publisher: Tundra Books
- Publication date: May 4, 2021
- Publication place: United States
- Media type: Print (hardcover)
- Pages: 48
- Awards: Governor General's Literary Award TD Canadian Children's Literature Award
- ISBN: 9780735266681

On the Trapline is a children's picture book written by David Alexander Robertson, illustrated by Julie Flett, and published May 4, 2021 by Tundra Books. It won the 2021 Governor General’s Literary Award for Young People's Literature – Illustrated Books, and the 2022 TD Canadian Children’s Literature Award at the Canadian Centre for Children's Book Centre Awards on September 29, 2022.

== Awards ==
The book won the 2021 Governor General's Literary Award for Young People's Literature – Illustrated Books at the 2021 Governor General's Awards, and the 2022 TD Canadian Children’s Literature Award at the Canadian Centre for Children's Book Centre Awards.

== Reception ==
On the Trapline received starred reviews from The Horn Book, Kirkus Reviews, and Publishers Weekly, as well as positive reviews from CM: Canadian Review of Materials, the Association of Children's Librarians of Northern California, Mutually Inclusive, the Canadian Children's Book Centre, and Booklist.
