= The Reckoner Trilogy =

Book series by David Robertson

- Strangers (2017); Monsters (2018); Ghosts (2019)
- Author: David Robertson
- Country: Canada
- Language: English
- Genre: Children's literature, Young adult fiction, Paranormal, Supernatural, Magical realism
- Publisher: HighWater Press
- Published: October 10, 2017 – September 24, 2019
- No. of books: 3

The Reckoner Trilogy is a young adult, fantasy book series written by David Robertson, published October 10, 2017 by HighWater Press. The series includes Strangers (2017), Monsters (2018), and Ghosts (2019).

== Reception ==
=== Reviews ===
Strangers received positive reviews from School Library Connection, The Horn Book Magazine, and Kirkus Reviews.

Monsters received a five-star review from CM: Canadian Review of Materials, as well as positive reviews from CanLit for LittleCanadians and Kirkus Reviews.

Ghosts received a five-star review from CM: Canadian Review of Materials, as well as positive reviews from The Globe and Mail, BCTF Magazine, and Quill & Quire.

=== Awards and honors ===
CBC Arts named Monsters one of the best young adult and middle-grade books of 2018 and Ghosts of the best young adult and middle-grade books of 2019.

Awards for the Reckoner books
Year	Title	Honor	Result	Ref.
2018	Strangers	High Plains Book Award for Indigenous Writer	Winner	
2018	Monsters	McNally Robinson Book for Young People Award: Older Category	Winner	
2018	Monsters	Michael Van Rooy Award for Genre Fiction	Winner	
2020	Ghosts	Arthur Ellis Awards for Excellence in Canadian Crime Writing: Best Juvenile or YA Crime Book	Shortlist	
2021	Ghosts	McNally Robinson Book for Young People Award: Older Category	Shortlist	
