= Épit et le géant =

Canadian children's book

Épit et le Géant
- Author: Geneviève Mativat
- Illustrator: Daniela Zékina Saint-Laurent
- Language: French
- Genre: Children's literature
- Publisher: Éditions P. Tisseyre
- Publication date: 2003
- Publication place: Canada
- Pages: 54
- ISBN: 289051868X

Épit et le Géant is a children's book for eight-to-ten-year-olds written by Geneviève Mativat and illustrated by Daniela Zékina Saint-Laurent.

== Summary ==
The story is inspired by a story from Innu culture, set in the time when people lived alongside giants. The young Épit's home has been afflicted by a poor hunting season, and Épit gets lost in the forest. His parents move on to a new hunting-ground without him. Épit meets the giant Mishtapew, who protects him from hunger and cold. With Mishtapew's help, Épit rediscovers his family, but Mishtapew makes it clear to them that they need to protect their child and respect nature. As they part, Mishtapew shows Épit how to communicate with spirits. On account of these skills, Épit becomes a shaman.

== Reviews ==
- Constellations : Épit et le géant.
- Levasseur, Jean (2004). "Actualités littéraires du Québec". Nouvelles Études Francophones. 19 (2): 197–225. ISSN 1552-3152.
- JP, "ÉPIT ET LE GÉANT", in Lisez sur le sujet: Récits autochtones (Bibliotheques et Archives Canada, 2006–7), p. 9. ISBN 0-662-49429-6.
- Turgeon, É. (2015). "Le premier printemps du monde", Lurelu, 38(2), 87–88.
