= When We Were Alone =

2016 children's book by David A. Robertson

- Author: David Robertson (writer)
- Illustrators: Julie Flett
- Language: English, Swampy Cree language
- Genre: Children's literature, Historical fiction
- Publication date: December 1, 2016
- Publication place: United States
- Media type: Print

When We Were Alone is a children's book written by David Robertson, illustrated by Julie Flett and published December 1, 2016 by HighWater Press. The book is published in English, and one edition include text in Swampy Cree syllabics and Roman orthography, translated by Alderick Leask.

The book tells the story of a young girl who asks her grandmother about the grandmother's colorful clothing while they are gardening. From there, the grandmother tells some of her history of living in a residential school as a child, during which times she and others broke the school's rules "when [they] were alone."

== Reception ==
When We Were Alone received starred review from Booklist, as well as positive reviews from American Indians in Children's Literature and Kirkus Reviews.

The book received the following accolades:

- Governor General's Literary Awards: Young People's Literature — Illustrated Books winner (2017)
- Shining Willow Award nominee (2018)

== See also ==
- How David A. Robertson wrote a picture book about the history of Canada's residential schools
- David Alexander Robertson on "When We Were Alone"
- David Alexander Robertson talks about his winning book, When We Were Alone
- Why David A. Robertson wanted When We Were Alone to celebrate the Cree language
