= Arok Wolvengrey =

Canadian linguist (born 1965)

Arok Elessar Wolvengrey (/ˈærək ˈwʊlvənɡreɪ/ ARR-ək WUUL-vən-gray; born 2 June 1965 in Saskatoon, Saskatchewan) is a Canadian linguist noted for his work with Amerindian languages.

Wolvengrey received his bachelor's degree at the University of Saskatchewan, his Master's at the University of Manitoba, and his Doctorate at University of Amsterdam.

On 15 October 2001, Wolvengrey published what is regarded as the most extensive Cree–English dictionary to date. The two-volume work, titled ᓀᐦᐃᔭᐍᐏᐣ: ᐃᑗᐏᓇ / nēhiýawēwin: itwēwina / Cree: Words, includes 15,000 Cree-to-English and 35,000 English-to-Cree entries.

Along with his wife, Dr. Jean Okimāsis, Wolvengrey published a manual on how to use the standard Roman orthography for writing in Plains Cree.

As of 2018, Wolvengrey is Professor of Algonquian Languages and Linguistics in the Department of Indigenous Languages, Arts and Cultures at the First Nations University of Canada (FNUniv), University of Regina campus. His regularly offered classes focus on syntax and the languages of the Americas.

== Literature ==
- Wolvengrey, Arok, ed. ᓀᐦᐃᔭᐍᐏᐣ: ᐃᑗᐏᓇ / nēhiýawēwin: itwēwina/Cree: Words. Canadian Plains Research Center, 15 October 2001. ISBN 0-88977-127-8.
- New Cree dictionary launched (University of Regina press release, 15 October 2001)
