= Beatrice Mosionier =

Canadian Métis author (born 1949)

Beatrice Culleton Mosionier (born 1949) is a Canadian Métis author. She is most notable for her novel In Search of April Raintree.

== Life and career ==
Mosionier was born in Saint Boniface, Manitoba, to Mary Clara Pelleter Mosionier. She is the youngest of four children. Mosionier grew up living in several foster homes in Winnipeg as a ward of the Children's Aid Society. She attended St. Charles Catholic School, and Gordon Bell High School, completing Grade 11.

Mosionier met and later married Bill Culleton, and they have two children, Bill and Debbie. The couple separated several times, living mainly in Toronto. There Mosionier worked as a watch inspector at a factory. She enrolled at George Brown College and later worked at Wahn, Mayer and Mith law firm, as a bookkeeper. Later the couple returned to Winnipeg, where eventually they divorced. The family then moved to Vita, Manitoba, and later Oakbank and St. Norbert.

At this time Mosionier began writing her first novel In Search Of April Raintree which was published in 1983.

In 1987, Mosionier moved to Toronto, and in 1988 she married George Moehring. As of 2014, the couple live in Winnipeg.

In 2013, she addressed a crowd on the steps of the Manitoba Legislature as part of the Idle No More movement.

== Writings ==
=== Novels ===
Mosionier's novel, In Search of April Raintree, was published in 1983. The story of April and Cheryl Raintree, two Métis sisters growing up in foster homes in Manitoba, Canada, and chronicling their lives from childhood into adulthood, was based on the traumatic experiences from Mosionier's own life, including sexual violence, the suicide of two of her sisters, and the search for her Métis identity. A revised edition of In Search of April Raintree, was published in 1984 entitled April Raintree. April Raintree (1984) is an expurgated version of the original, intended for young readers. Much of the original language in In Search of April Raintree (1983) i.e. profanity and graphic descriptions of sexual violence, including rape, was censored.

Mosionier's second novel, published in 2000, is titled In a Shadow of Evil. It is set in the Canadian Rockies, and follows the life of a young girl going through family trauma and foster care. The novel was inspired by Mosionier's molestation by a priest at age three.

=== Children's stories ===
Mosionier's first children's book Spirit of the White Bison (1985) is told from the perspective of a young white bison. It portrays a distinct part of Canadian history, the fall of bison herds and the European settlers.

Mosionier's story Christopher's Folly (1996) tells of a young man who is forced to understand his foolishness in a dream in order to earn respect for animals, and the world around him. It teaches children to respect their surroundings.

Her next book, Unusual Friendships: A little black Cat and a Little White Rat (2002) the story of an unusual friendship between a black cat and a white rat, refers to different Métis relationships. It symbolizes the difficulties that Métis persons experience through not being purebred. The white rat attempts to teach others the jig and together the cat and the rat stick together to get respect for who they are. The story was created with a rhyme pattern.

=== Memoir ===
In 2009, Mosionier wrote Come Walk With Me: A Memoir, which depicts all of her life events and she shares emotional details of the experiences that she has faced. The book has received a number of positive reviews.

Mosionier also contributed to the anthology Memoir of Manitoba, a collection of stories by native authors.

== Works ==
=== Novels ===
- In Search of April Raintree (1983)
- In the Shadow of Evil (2000)

=== Young adult adaptations ===
- April Raintree (1984), adapted from In Search of April Raintree

=== Children's books ===
- Spirit of the White Bison (1985)
- Christopher's Folly (1996)
- Unusual Friendships: A Little Black Cat and a Little White Rat (2002)

=== Memoirs ===
- Come Walk with Me: A Memoir (2009)

=== German translations ===
- Halbblut! Die Geschichte der April Raintree (1994), translated from In Search of April Raintree by Annette Kohl-Beyer
- "Komm, begleite mich" (2009), an excerpt from Come Walk with Me: A Memoir, published in the bilingual anthology Heute sind wir hier / We Are Here Today, edited by Hartmut Lutz
