= Wilfred Buck =

Canadian/Cree science educator

- Education: University of Manitoba
- Known for: knowledge of First Nations astronomy

Wilfred Buck (born September 27, 1954) is a science facilitator at the Manitoba First Nations Education Resource Centre and an Indigenous star lore expert. A member of the Opaskwayak Cree Nation, Buck is known as "the star guy" due to his knowledge of First Nations astronomy. He has researched and consulted with elders to learn more about the astronomical knowledge of Cree, Ojibway, and Lakota peoples.

== Early life and education ==
Buck grew up in northern Manitoba on the Opaskwayak Cree Nation, near Saskatchewan. He developed his love of astronomy at a young age and has described being "totally blown away by the immensity" of the night sky as a child. As a teenager, he spent time homeless on the streets of Vancouver. Cree elders invited him back to Manitoba, and he learned about Cree culture.

He has a Bachelor of Education and postbaccalaureate education from the University of Manitoba.

== Career ==
Buck began working at the Manitoba First Nations Education Resource Centre as a science facilitator around 2008. His mandate in the role was to "put the First Nations perspective into science"; consulting with elders, he realized he instead needed to put science into a First Nations perspective. He began using the stars, "atchakosuk" in Cree, as a way to learn more about the scientific knowledge of the Ininewuk (Cree) people, Lakota people, and the Anishinaabe (Ojibway) people.

Using two portable dome-shaped planetariums, Buck teaches First Nations students about the stars visible in the night sky. He tours the planetariums to the 55 band-operated schools in Manitoba, projecting constellations onto the dome and sharing stories about each. Students refer to him as "the star guy". In his work, Buck discusses the deep knowledge that First Nations people had about astronomy: not just naming constellations, but using their observations to contemplate topics such as cosmology and quantum physics.

Along with indigenous astronomer Annette S. Lee, Buck was a co-curator of the "One Sky, Many Astronomies" exhibit at Ottawa's Canada Science and Technology Museum, featuring constellations of Canada's indigenous cultures. He served as a storyteller and content expert in the 22-minute film Legends of the Night Sky, shown on the planetarium of Telus World of Science in Edmonton.

Buck has gathered more than two dozen star stories from indigenous elders around Manitoba. In 2016, in collaboration with members of the Native Skywatchers initiative, Buck and partners Annette Lee and William Wilson created a native sky map, Ininew Achakos Masinkan, an artistic rendition of Cree constellations in planisphere format. He is one of the co-organizers of the first Indigenous Star Knowledge Symposium, scheduled to be held in 2021 in Ottawa and featuring indigenous knowledge keepers from around the world.

In 2024, he was the subject of Wilfred Buck, a documentary film by Lisa Jackson.

== NameExoWorlds contest ==
In 2019, the International Astronomical Union (IAU) celebrated its 100 year anniversary. As part of the centenary celebrations, the IAU ran the NameExoWorlds contest. As part of this contest, the IAU assigned a star with an exoplanet to each participating country. Astronomers in each country ran a contest where members of the public were invited to propose a set of names for the star and exoplanet. Canada's contest was run by the Canadian Astronomical Society (CASCA). The IAU assigned Canada the star HD 136418 and its exoplanet HD 136418b, and over 500 pairs of names were submitted in the contest. Since many Indigenous names were proposed, Wilfred Buck was asked to review the proposals, in particular one proposal to use the names for mother and child in the Cree language made by teacher Amanda Green. Wilfred Buck made some changes to her original proposal, and the final names chosen for the star and exoplanet were Nikawiy for the star and Awasis for the exoplanet. CASCA credits both Green and Buck for the pair of names.

== Books ==
Buck is the author of the 2018 book Tipiskawi Kisik: Night Sky Star Stories, an exploration of the night sky from a Ininew (Cree) perspective.

In 2021, he published I Have Lived Four Lives, a memoir of his own journey from a troubled and impoverished childhood to becoming a respected scientist.
