= Star lore =

Creation and cherishing of mythical stories about the stars and star patterns

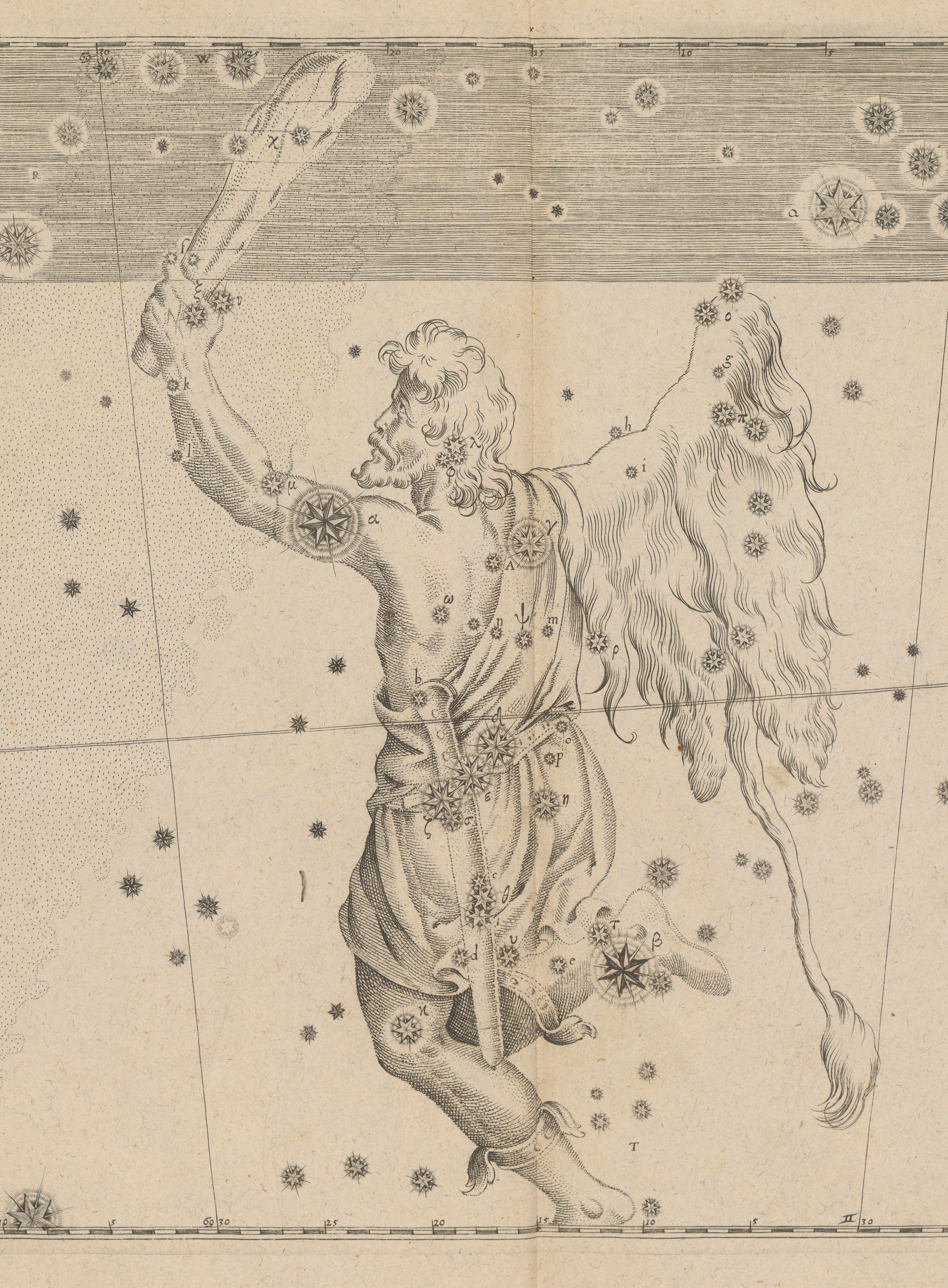
Johann Bayer's Uranometria showing the constellation Orion. Orion the Hunter is star lore created by the ancient Greeks.

Star lore or starlore is the creation and cherishing of mythical stories about the stars and star patterns (constellations and asterisms); that is, folklore based upon the stars and star patterns. Using the stars to explain religious doctrines or actual events in history is also defined as star lore. Star lore has a very long history; it has been practiced by nearly every culture recorded in history, dating as far back as 5,500 years ago. It was practiced by prehistoric cultures of the Paleolithic and Neolithic periods as well.

== Orion and Scorpius ==
One example of star lore is the invention of the story of Orion the Hunter and the scorpion, Scorpius, by the ancient Greeks. This ancient culture saw a very striking pattern of bright stars in the winter sky that, from their point of view, resembled a mighty hunter, which they named Orion. During the summer, they saw another striking pattern of bright stars that resembled a scorpion. They noticed that the constellations of Orion and the scorpion were positioned at opposite ends of the sky and were never seen in the sky simultaneously. As one constellation rose above the eastern horizon, the other was setting below the western horizon, and when either one was high in the sky, the other was completely absent. The ancient Greeks felt compelled to explain this phenomenon by composing a story or myth based on the two constellations.

The story was that Orion was a mighty and proud hunter who was stung by a scorpion. Orion died of the scorpion's sting and was placed among the stars by the gods. Although the scorpion was destroyed by the gods in vengeance for killing Orion, it was also placed among the stars. In order to prevent Orion and the scorpion from quarreling and fighting with each other in the sky, the gods placed Orion and the scorpion at opposite ends of the sky, and in opposite seasons, so that both of them could never be seen in the sky at the same time.

== Andromeda ==
Another example of star lore is the story behind the constellation Andromeda, also known as "the chained woman". Andromeda was the daughter of the king and queen of Ethiopia, King Cepheus and Cassiopeia. The story goes that because Cassiopeia bragged so much of Andromeda's beauty to the Nereids, daughters of Poseidon, that they complained to their father, who sent a sea monster to destroy the coast of Ethiopia. Cepheus consulted an oracle for assistance and learned that the only way to save his lands was to sacrifice his daughter to Poseidon's monster.

Andromeda was chained to a rock and left for the sea monster. Perseus, the hero of the story who had just killed the Gorgon Medusa found Andromeda in her distress and immediately, the two fell in love. Perseus asked for her name and refused to leave until he knew it, talking to her until she gave in. Andromeda told him her name, her country, and the reason for her imprisonment on the rock. He then consulted with Cepheus and Cassiopeia, and they decided that if Perseus rescued Andromeda from the sea monster, he could marry her. The story of how he then defeats the monster varies. Ovid describes his killing of the monster as a drawn out bloody battle. Other sources say that Perseus killed the sea monster with the aid of Medusa's head, turning the monster to stone. Andromeda and Perseus were married soon after, despite already being promised to her uncle, Phineus. At the wedding, Phineus and Perseus got into an altercation, and Perseus turned Phineus to stone using Medusa's head.

The constellation is said to have astrological influences as well. It is said that any man born at the same time Andromeda is said to rise from the sea will be one without mercy; he will be emotionally unmoved even in the presence of grieving parents. The constellation also influences the birth of the executioner, a man who will kill swiftly for money and kill willingly. Sources describe men born with the rise of Andromeda as those who would feel nothing if faced with Andromeda chained to her rock, just as Perseus did and fell in love with the girl.

== Draco ==
The Draco is another example of star lore. In Roman mythology, the constellation is representative of Ladon, the dragon that guarded the golden apples inside the garden, Hesperides. The tree was a wedding gift to Hera when she and Zeus were married, and she planted it on Mount Atlas. Hera tasked the Hesperides to guard the tree and put Ladon around the tree as well to ensure that the Hesperides would not steal the apples. In some sources, Ladon is called the child of Typhon and Echidna, who was half woman and half viper, and had hundreds of heads. In other versions of Ladon's story, the number of heads he had is not at all mentioned and he is described as the offspring of Ceto and Phorcys, two sea deities.

Contrastingly, in Roman mythology, Draco was one of the Titans who waged war on the Olympic gods for ten years. He was killed by Minerva in the battle and thrown into the sky.

== Wormwood ==
Yet another example of star lore is Wormwood. In the Book of Revelation, Wormwood is prophesied to be a star that, upon its descent, would turn all the waters of the earth bitter. It is mentioned only once in the New Testament, as follows:

The third angel blew his trumpet, and a great star fell from heaven, blazing like a torch, and it fell on a third of the rivers and on the springs of water. The name of the star is Wormwood. A third of the waters became wormwood, and many died from the water, because it was made bitter. (Rev 8:10–11)

Some historians, scholars, and commentators interpret Wormwood as symbolizing important figures or events as opposed to being a literal star. In other interpretations, Wormwood is an angel.

== See also ==
- Dog days
