= David Robertson (writer) =

Canadian Cree writer (born 1977)

- Born: 12 January 1977 (age 49)
- Education: University of Winnipeg
- Occupation: author
- Years active: 2009–present
- Notable work: When We Were Alone; The Barren Grounds; On the Trapline

David Alexander Robertson (born 12 January 1977) is a Canadian author and public speaker from Winnipeg, Manitoba. He has published over 25 books across a variety of genres and is a two-time winner of the Governor General's Literary Award His first novel, The Evolution of Alice, was published in 2014. Robertson is a member of the Norway House Cree Nation.

== Early life and education ==
Robertson was born in Brandon, Manitoba to a Swampy Cree father and mother of Scottish, Irish and English ancestry. He first kindled an ambition to be a writer around the age of eight, but did not have a steady path to becoming a writer. He grew up in Winnipeg with summers spent in Melita, Manitoba. Robertson graduated with a BA from the University of Winnipeg in 1999.

== Career ==
Robertson began writing in earnest around 2008, at a time when he had begun to overcome the negative view of his Indigenous heritage with which he had grown up and had formed a stronger and more positive sense of his Indigenous identity:

I started to think about what I could do to put it into schools, because I was missing that. By that time, I had become more connected to the culture. I worked to learn more about it and finally got to the point where I was proud to be part Cree and call myself an Indigenous person. I wanted that for other youth, because I saw, working in communities, that there was a lot of that same sort of feeling.

Robertson's young adult and children's works are widely used in libraries and classrooms across Canada, especially his graphic novels. His works often grapple with hard and violent histories, including the residential school system in Canada. Robertson's graphic novels include the 7 Generations series, the Tales From Big Spirit series, and Betty: The Helen Betty Osborne Story, which tells the true story of a young Indigenous woman who was abducted and brutally murdered by four young men in 1971.

Robertson has contributed to several anthologies, including Manitowapow: Aboriginal Writings From the Land of Water and Love Beyond Body, Space, and Time: An LGBT and two-spirit sci-fi anthology. His work has been featured in CV2 and Prairie Fire. He has written articles for the Toronto Star, CBC, and Book and Periodical Council's Freedom to Read site.

As of 2020, Robertson worked for the Manitoba First Nations Education Resource Centre. In 2022, he was appointed editorial director of a children's imprint for Penguin Random House Canada. He is writer and host of the Kíwew podcast.

== Awards and nominations ==
Mr. Robertson was nominated for four Manitoba Book Awards in 2015, with The Evolution of Alice winning the John Hirsch Award for Most Promising Manitoba Author. Robertson also won the Aboriginal Circle of Educators award for Research/Curriculum development in 2015. The Evolution of Alice was shortlisted for the Burt Award for First Nations, Metis, and Inuit Literature.

In 2016, Robertson was nominated for the Beatrice Mosionier Award for Aboriginal Writer of the Year and the McNally Robinson Books for Young People Award. That same year, The Evolution of Alice was selected as the 2016 winner for On the Same Page, a joint initiative between the Winnipeg Public Library and the Winnipeg Foundation that encourages all Manitobans to read and discuss the same book. Robertson's graphic novel Betty: The Helen Betty Osborne Story was included on the In the Margins Official List for Nonfiction and was a finalist for the 2016 High Plains Book Awards in the Creative Nonfiction category.

In 2017, Robertson won the Manuela Dias Book Design and Illustration Awards/GRAPHIC NOVEL Category for Will I See?, which was illustrated by GMB Chomichuk, with cover design by Relish New Brand Experience. That same year, he won the McNally Robinson Book for Young People Awards (Younger Category) and the Governor General's Literary Award for When We Were Alone, illustrated by Julie Flett, with design by Relish New Brand Experience. When We Were Alone was also a finalist for the TD Canadian Children's Literature Award. Robertson won the 2017 Beatrice Mosionier Aboriginal Writer of the Year Award, tied with Trevor Greyeyes.

In 2018, the first book in Robertson's Reckoner series won the McNally Robinson Best Book for Young People Award, the Manitoba Book Awards' Michael Van Rooy Award for Genre Fiction, and the Indigenous Writer of the Year Award at the 2018 High Plains Book Awards.

In 2020, Black Water: Family, Legacy, and Blood Memory won the Carol Shields Winnipeg Book Award at the Manitoba Book Awards.

The Barren Grounds, which is the first book in Robertson's Misewa Saga, was nominated for the Governor General's Literary Award in 2021 in the Young People's Literature – Text category. This text was also named one of Kirkus and Quill & Quire's best books of 2020, CBC Books' best middle-grade and young adult books of 2020, and one of Canadian Children's Book News's best books of 2020. The Barren Grounds was also shortlisted for the Ontario Library Association's Silver Birch Award and was a USBBY and Texas Lone Star selection.

In 2021, Robertson won the Writers' Union of Canada Freedom to Read Award. and Alexander Kennedy Isbister Award at the 2021 Manitoba Book Awards. His podcast, Kíwew, also won the 2021 RTDNA Prairie Region Award for Best Podcast.

His book On the Trapline, illustrated by Julie Flett, was the winner of the Governor General's Award for English-language children's illustration at the 2021 Governor General's Awards.

In 2023, Robertson was honoured with a Doctor of Letters by the University of Manitoba for outstanding contributions in the arts and distinguished achievements.

== Works ==
=== Children and young adult books ===
- When We Were Alone (2016)
- Strangers (The Reckoner Trilogy, Book 1) (2017)
- Monsters (The Reckoner Trilogy, Book 2) (2018)
- Ghosts (The Reckoner Trilogy, Book 3) (2019)
- Ispík kákí péyakoyak | When We Were Alone (2020)
- The Barren Grounds (The Misewa Saga, Book One) (2020)
- The Great Bear (The Misewa Saga, Book Two) (2021)
- On the Trapline (2021)
- The Stone Child (The Misewa Saga, Book Three) (2022)
- The Portal Keeper (The Misewa Saga Book Four) (2023)
- The Sleeping Giant (The Miswea Saga, Book Five) (2025)

=== Novels and other literature ===
- The Evolution of Alice (2014)
- Black Water: Family, Legacy, and Blood Memory (2020)
- The Theory of Crows (2022)
- All the Little Monsters - How I Learned to Live with Anxiety (2025)

=== Graphic novels ===
- Stone (7 Generations series, Book 1) (2010)
- Scars (7 Generations series, Book 2) (2010)
- Ends/Begins (7 Generations series, Book 3) (2010)
- The Pact (7 Generations series, Book 4) (2011)
- 7 Generations: A Plains Cree Saga (Collected 7 Generations series) (2012)
- Sugar Falls (2012)
- The Poet: Pauline Johnson (2014)
- The Rebel: Gabriel Dumont (2014)
- The Scout: Tommy Prince (2014)
- The Land of Os: John Ramsay (2014)
- The Peacemaker: Thanadelthur (2014)
- The Ballad of Nancy April: Shawnadithit (2014)
- Betty: The Helen Betty Osborne Story (2015)
- The Chief: Mistahimaskwa (2016)
- Will I See? (2016)
- Breakdown (The Reckoner Rises, Volume 1) (2020)
- Version Control (The Reckoner Rises, Volume 2) (2022)

=== Anthology contributions ===
- Manitowapow: Aboriginal Writings From the Land of Water (2011)
- Love Beyond Body, Space, and Time: An LGBT and two-spirit sci-fi anthology (2016)
- This Place: 150 Years Retold (2019)
- Love After the End: Two-Spirit Utopias & Dystopias (2019)
- Take Us to a Better Place: Stories (2019)
- Moonshot: the Indigenous Comics Collection (Vols. 1, 2, and 3) (2020)
- Ancestor Approved: Intertribal Stories for Kids (2021)

=== Non-fiction ===
- Robertson, David A. (2025). 52 Ways to Reconcile: How to Walk with Indigenous Peoples on the Path to Healing. New York: McClelland & Stewart. ISBN 978-0-7710-1935-7.
