= Jean Okimāsis =

Cree linguist

Dr. Jean Okimāsis
- Pronunciation: (/ˈdʒiːn oʊˈɡɪˌmɑːsɪs/)
- Born: Jean Lillian Littlechief; 1938 (age 87–88); White Bear First Nations
- Education: University of Regina
- Spouse: Arok Wolvengrey

Dr. Jean L. Okimāsis (born Jean Lillian Littlechief) is a Cree linguist who has worked on teaching and documenting the Plains Cree language.

== Career ==
In 1982, Okimāsis started work on Cree language programs at the Saskatchewan Indian Federated college (now the First Nations University of Canada). She published a textbook, workbook, and teaching grammar of the Cree language called Cree, Language of the Plains, which is publicly available under a Creative commons license.

Okimāsis has been instrumental in developing and promoting the use of the standard Roman orthography for writing the Cree language. In 2008, she cowrote How to Spell it in Cree (The Standard Roman Orthography) with Arok Wolvengrey.

== Recognition ==
Okimāsis received the YWCA Woman of Distinction Award in 2000, and an honorary doctorate from the University of Regina in 2005.

In 2019, a park was named after Okimāsis in Regina.

== See also ==
- Arok Wolvengrey
- Solomon Ratt

== Bibliography ==
- Okimāsis, Jean L. (2004). Cree: Language of the Plains/nēhiyawēwin: paskwāwi-pīkiskwēwin. Regina: Canadian Plains Research Center. ISBN 0-88977-155-3.
- Okimāsis, Jean; Wolvengrey, Arok (2009). How to Spell it in Cree (The Standard Roman Orthography) (PDF). Regina: miywāsin ink. ISBN 978-0-9784935-0-9.
