= Cree language =

Aboriginal language continuum

Cree
- ᓀᐦᐃᔭᐍᐏᐣ, nēhiyawēwin (Plains) ᓃᐦᐃᖬᐑᐏᐣ, nīhithawīwin (Woods) ᓀᐦᐃᓇᐌᐎᐣ, nêhinawêwin (W. Swampy) ᐃᓂᓃᒧᐎᓐ, ininîmowin (E. Swampy) ᐃᔨᓂᐤ ᐊᔭᒥᐎᓐ, Iyiniu-Ayamiwin (N. Eastern) ᐄᔨᔫ ᐊᔨᒨᓐ, Iyiyiu-Ayamiwin (S. Eastern)
- Historical distribution of Cree peoples
- Native to: Canada; United States (Montana)
- Ethnicity: Cree
- Native speakers: 86,000 (2021)
- Language family: Algic: Algonquian; Cree-Montagnais-Naskapi; Cree
- Writing system: Latin, Canadian Aboriginal syllabics (Cree)

Official status
- Official language in: Northwest Territories
- Recognised minority language in: Alberta; Manitoba; Ontario; Quebec; Saskatchewan

Language codes
- ISO 639-1: cr
- ISO 639-2: cre
- ISO 639-3: cre – inclusive code Individual codes: crk – Plains Cree cwd – Woods Cree csw – Swampy Cree crm – Moose Cree crl – Northern East Cree crj – Southern East Cree nsk – Naskapi moe – Montagnais atj – Atikamekw
- Glottolog: cree1271 Cree–Montagnais–Naskapi cree1272
- Six dialects of Cree are classified as Vulnerable by the UNESCO Atlas of the World's Languages in Danger.

Cree (/kriː/ KREE; also known as Cree–Montagnais–Naskapi) is a dialect continuum of Algonquian languages spoken by approximately 86,475 people across Canada in 2021, from the Northwest Territories to Alberta to Labrador. If considered one language, it is the aboriginal language with the highest number of speakers in Canada. The only region where Cree has any official status is in the Northwest Territories, alongside eight other aboriginal languages. There, Cree is spoken mainly in Fort Smith and Hay River.

== Names ==
Endonyms are:

- nêhiyawêwin ᓀᐦᐃᔭᐍᐏᐣ (Plains Cree)
- nīhithawīwin ᓃᐦᐃᖬᐑᐏᐣ (Woods Cree)
- nêhinawêwin ᓀᐦᐃᓇᐌᐎᐣ (Western Swampy Cree)
- ininîmowin ᐃᓂᓃᒧᐎᓐ (Eastern Swampy Cree)
- ililîmowin ᐃᓕᓖᒧᐎᓐ (Moose Cree)
- iyiniu-Ayamiwin ᐄᓅ ᐊᔨᒨᓐ (Southern East Cree)
- iyiyiu-Ayamiwin ᐄᔨᔫ ᐊᔨᒨᓐ (Northern East Cree)
- nehirâmowin (Atikamekw)
- nehlueun (Western Montagnais, Piyekwâkamî dialect)
- ilnu-Aimûn (Western Montagnais, Betsiamites dialect)
- innu-Aimûn (Eastern Montagnais)

== Dialects ==
=== Divisions ===
The Cree dialect continuum can be divided by many criteria. Dialects spoken in northern Ontario and the southern James Bay, Lanaudière, and Mauricie regions of Quebec differentiate /ʃ/ and /s/, while those to the west have merged the two phonemes as /s/ and in the east the phonemes are merged as either /ʃ/ or /h/. In several dialects, including northern Plains Cree and Woods Cree, the long vowels /eː/ and /iː/ have merged into a single vowel, /iː/. In the Quebec communities of Chisasibi, Whapmagoostui, and Kawawachikamach, the long vowel /eː/ has merged with /aː/.

However, the most transparent phonological variations between different Cree dialects are reflexes of Proto-Algonquian *l in the modern varieties, as shown below:

Dialect	Location	Reflex of *l	'native person' ← *elenyiwa	'you' ← *kīla
Plains Cree	SK, AB, BC, NT	y	iyiniw	kīya
Woods Cree	MB, SK	ð/th	iðiniw/ithiniw	kīða/kītha
Swampy Cree	ON, MB, SK	n	ininiw	kīna
Moose Cree	ON	l	ililiw	kīla
Atikamekw	Nitaskinan, QC	r	iriniw	kīr
Northern East Cree	Eeyou Istchee, QC	y	iyiyiw	čīy
Southern East Cree	Eeyou Istchee, QC	y	iyiyū/iyinū	čīy
Kawawachikamach Naskapi	Nitassinan, QC	y	iyiyū	čīy
Western Innu	Nitassinan, QC	l	ilnu	čīl
Eastern Innu	Nitassinan, QC, NL	n	innu	čīn

The Plains Cree, speakers of the y dialect, refer to their language as nēhiyawēwin, whereas Woods Cree speakers say nīhithawīwin, and Swampy Cree speakers say nēhinawēwin.

Another important phonological variation among the Cree dialects involves the palatalisation of Proto-Algonquian *k: East of the Ontario–Quebec border (except for Atikamekw), Proto-Algonquian *k has changed into /tʃ/ or /ts/ before front vowels. See the table above for examples in the *kīla column.

Very often, the Cree dialect continuum is divided into two languages: Cree and Innu/Montagnais. Cree includes all dialects which have not undergone the *k > /tʃ/ sound change (BC–QC) while Innu encompasses the territory where this sound change has occurred (QC–NL). These labels are very useful from a linguistic perspective, but are confusing as East Cree then qualifies as Montagnais. For practical purposes, 'Cree' usually covers the dialects that use the Cree syllabics as their orthography (including Atikamekw, but excluding Kawawachikamach Naskapi); the term Innu or Montagnais then applies to those dialects that use the Latin script (excluding Atikamekw, and including Kawawachikamach Naskapi). The term 'Naskapi' typically refers to Kawawachikamach (y-dialect) and Natuashish (n-dialect).

=== Groups ===
The Cree dialects can be broadly classified into nine groups. Roughly from west to east:

Cree dialect ISO codes
ISO-639-3 code and name		ISO-639-6 code and name		Linguasphere code and name			Moseley			Glottolog name (and code)			dialect type				additional comments	
ISO-639-3 code and name		ISO-639-6 code and name		Linguasphere code and name			Moseley			Glottolog name (and code)			*l	*k(i)	*š	*ē	additional comments	
cre Cree (generic)	cwd Woods Cree (Nīhithawīwin)	cwd Woods Cree		62-ADA-a Cree	62-ADA-ab; Woods Cree		Cree-Montagnais-Naskapi	Western Cree	Wood Cree	Cree-Montagnais-Naskapi cree1271	Woods Cree wood1236		ð	k	s	ī		In this dialect ē has merged into ī.
cre Cree (generic)	cwd Woods Cree (Nīhithawīwin)	cwd Woods Cree		62-ADA-a Cree	62-ADA-ab; Woods Cree		Cree-Montagnais-Naskapi	Western Cree	Wood Cree	Cree-Montagnais-Naskapi cree1271	Plains Cree plai1258	Western York Cree	r → ð	k	s	ī		Missinipi Cree (Nīhirawīwin). Also known as "Rocky Cree". Historical r have transitioned to ð and have merged into Woods Cree. While Woods Cree proper have hk, Missinipi Cree have sk, e.g., Woods Cree mihkosiw v. Missinipi Cree miskosiw: 'he/she is red'.
cre Cree (generic)	crk Plains Cree	crk Plains Cree		62-ADA-a Cree	62-ADA-aa; Plains Cree		Cree-Montagnais-Naskapi	Western Cree	Plains Cree	Cree-Montagnais-Naskapi cree1271	Plains Cree plai1258	Northern Alberta Cree	y	k	s	ī	(northern)	Divided to Southern Plains Cree (Nēhiyawēwin) and Northern Plains Cree (Nīhiyawīwin or Nīhiyawīmowin). In the Northern dialect, ē has merged into ī.
cre Cree (generic)	crk Plains Cree	crk Plains Cree		62-ADA-a Cree	62-ADA-aa; Plains Cree		Cree-Montagnais-Naskapi	Western Cree	Plains Cree	Cree-Montagnais-Naskapi cree1271	Plains Cree plai1258	Nuclear Plains Cree	y	k	s	ē	(southern)	Divided to Southern Plains Cree (Nēhiyawēwin) and Northern Plains Cree (Nīhiyawīwin or Nīhiyawīmowin). In the Northern dialect, ē has merged into ī.
cre Cree (generic)	csw Swampy Cree (Nēhinawēwin)	csw Swampy Cree		62-ADA-a Cree	62-ADA-ac; Swampy Cree, West (Ininīmowin)		Cree-Montagnais-Naskapi	Western Cree	Swampy Cree	Cree-Montagnais-Naskapi cree1271	Swampy Cree swam1239	Western Swampy Cree	n	k	s	ē		Eastern Swampy Cree, together with Moose Cree, also known as "West Main Cree," "Central Cree," or "West Shore Cree." In the western dialect, š has merged with s. Western Swampy Cree also known as "York Cree;" together with Northern Plains Cree and Woods Cree, also known as "Western Woodland Cree."
cre Cree (generic)	csw Swampy Cree (Nēhinawēwin)	csw Swampy Cree		62-ADA-a Cree	62-ADA-ad; Swampy Cree, East (Ininiwi-Išikišwēwin)		Cree-Montagnais-Naskapi	Western Cree	Swampy Cree	Cree-Montagnais-Naskapi cree1271	Swampy Cree swam1239	Eastern Swampy Cree	n	k	š	ē		Eastern Swampy Cree, together with Moose Cree, also known as "West Main Cree," "Central Cree," or "West Shore Cree." In the western dialect, š has merged with s. Western Swampy Cree also known as "York Cree;" together with Northern Plains Cree and Woods Cree, also known as "Western Woodland Cree."
cre Cree (generic)	crm Moose Cree (Ililīmowin)	crm Moose Cree		62-ADA-a Cree	62-ADA-ae; Moose Cree		Cree-Montagnais-Naskapi	Western Cree	Moose Cree	Cree-Montagnais-Naskapi cree1271	Moose Cree moos1236		n\l	k	š	ē	(lowland)	Together with the Eastern Swampy Cree, also known as "West Main Cree," "Central Cree," or "West Shore Cree." In Swampy Cree-influenced areas, some speakers use n instead of l, e.g., upland Moose Cree iniliw v. lowland Moose Cree ililiw: 'human'. Kesagami Lake Cree was an r dialect but has transitioned and merged with l dialect of Moose Cree.
cre Cree (generic)	crm Moose Cree (Ililīmowin)	crm Moose Cree		62-ADA-a Cree	62-ADA-ae; Moose Cree		Cree-Montagnais-Naskapi	Western Cree	Moose Cree	Cree-Montagnais-Naskapi cree1271	Moose Cree moos1236		l	k	š	ē	(upland)	Together with the Eastern Swampy Cree, also known as "West Main Cree," "Central Cree," or "West Shore Cree." In Swampy Cree-influenced areas, some speakers use n instead of l, e.g., upland Moose Cree iniliw v. lowland Moose Cree ililiw: 'human'. Kesagami Lake Cree was an r dialect but has transitioned and merged with l dialect of Moose Cree.
cre Cree (generic)	crm Moose Cree (Ililīmowin)	crm Moose Cree		62-ADA-a Cree	62-ADA-ae; Moose Cree		Cree-Montagnais-Naskapi	Western Cree	Moose Cree	Cree-Montagnais-Naskapi cree1271	Moose Cree moos1236		r → l	k	š	ē	(Kesagami Lake)	Together with the Eastern Swampy Cree, also known as "West Main Cree," "Central Cree," or "West Shore Cree." In Swampy Cree-influenced areas, some speakers use n instead of l, e.g., upland Moose Cree iniliw v. lowland Moose Cree ililiw: 'human'. Kesagami Lake Cree was an r dialect but has transitioned and merged with l dialect of Moose Cree.
cre Cree (generic)	crl Northern East Cree (Īyyū Ayimūn)	crl Northern East Cree		62-ADA-a Cree	62-ADA-af; Cree, East		Cree-Montagnais-Naskapi	Eastern Cree	East Cree	Cree-Montagnais-Naskapi cree1271	Northern East Cree nort1552		y	k\č	š	ā		Also known as "James Bay Cree" or "East Main Cree". The long vowels ē and ā have merged in the northern dialect but are distinct in the southern. Southern East Cree is divided between coastal (southwestern) and inland (southeastern) varieties. Also, the inland southern dialect has lost the distinction between s and š. Here, the inland southern dialect falls in line with the rest of the Naskapi groups where both phonemes have become š. Nonetheless, the people from the two areas easily communicate. In the northern dialect, ki is found in situations were short unaccented vowel a transitioned to i without changing the k to č.
cre Cree (generic)	crj Southern East Cree (Īynū Ayimūn)	crj Southern East Cree		62-ADA-a Cree	62-ADA-ag; Cree, Southeast		Cree-Montagnais-Naskapi	Eastern Cree	East Cree	Cree-Montagnais-Naskapi cree1271	Southern East Cree sout2978		y	č	š	ē	(coastal)	
cre Cree (generic)	crj Southern East Cree (Īynū Ayimūn)	crj Southern East Cree		62-ADA-a Cree	62-ADA-ag; Cree, Southeast		Cree-Montagnais-Naskapi	Eastern Cree	East Cree	Cree-Montagnais-Naskapi cree1271	Southern East Cree sout2978		y\n	č	š~s	ē	(inland)	
nsk Naskapi		nsk Naskapi	kkaa Koksoak	62-ADA-b; Innu	62-ADA-ba; Mushau Innuts	62-ADA-baa; Koksoak River	Cree-Montagnais-Naskapi	Eastern Cree	Naskapi	Cree-Montagnais-Naskapi cree1271	Naskapi nask1242	Western Naskapi	y	č	š~s	ā		Western Naskapi (or simply referred to as Naskapi). Spoken in Kawawachikamach, Quebec.
nsk Naskapi		nsk Naskapi	dvsi Davis Inlet	62-ADA-b; Innu	62-ADA-ba; Mushau Innuts	62-ADA-bab; Davis Inlet	Cree-Montagnais-Naskapi	Eastern Cree	Naskapi	Cree-Montagnais-Naskapi cree1271	Naskapi nask1242	Eastern Naskapi	n	č	š~s	ē		Eastern Naskapi; also known as Mushuau Innu. Spoken in Natuashish, Labrador.
moe Montagnais		moe Montagnais	poit Pointe-Bleue	62-ADA-b; Innu	62-ADA-bb; Uashau Innuts + Bersimis	62-ADA-bbe; Pointe Bleue	Cree-Montagnais-Naskapi	Eastern Cree	Montagnais	Cree-Montagnais-Naskapi cree1271	Montagnais mont1268	Western Montagnais	l	č	š	ē		Western Montagnais (Lehlueun); also known as the "Betsiamites dialect"
moe Montagnais		moe Montagnais	escu Escoumains	62-ADA-b; Innu	62-ADA-bb; Uashau Innuts + Bersimis	62-ADA-bbd; Escoumains	Cree-Montagnais-Naskapi	Eastern Cree	Montagnais	Cree-Montagnais-Naskapi cree1271	Montagnais mont1268	Western Montagnais	l	č	š	ē		Western Montagnais (Lehlueun); also known as the "Betsiamites dialect"
moe Montagnais		moe Montagnais	berm Bersimis	62-ADA-b; Innu	62-ADA-bb; Uashau Innuts + Bersimis	62-ADA-bbc; Bersimis	Cree-Montagnais-Naskapi	Eastern Cree	Montagnais	Cree-Montagnais-Naskapi cree1271	Montagnais mont1268	Western Montagnais	l	č	š	ē		Western Montagnais (Lehlueun); also known as the "Betsiamites dialect"
moe Montagnais		moe Montagnais	uasi Uashaui-Innuts	62-ADA-b; Innu	62-ADA-bb; Uashau Innuts + Bersimis	62-ADA-bbb; Uashaui Innuts	Cree-Montagnais-Naskapi	Eastern Cree	Montagnais	Cree-Montagnais-Naskapi cree1271	Montagnais mont1268	Western Montagnais	n	č	š~h	ē		Part of Western Montagnais, but more precisely referred to as Central Montagnais. š is realized as h in intervocalic position, especially amongst middle-aged and young speakers.
moe Montagnais		moe Montagnais	miga Mingan	62-ADA-b; Innu	62-ADA-bb; Uashau Innuts + Bersimis	62-ADA-bba; Mingan	Cree-Montagnais-Naskapi	Eastern Cree	Montagnais	Cree-Montagnais-Naskapi cree1271	Montagnais mont1268	Eastern Montagnais	n	č	š~h	ē		Eastern Montagnais (Innu-aimûn). š is mostly realized as h.
atj Atikamekw (Nehirâmowin)		atj Atikamekw	mana Manawan	62-ADA-c; Atikamekw	62-ADA-ca; Manawan		Cree-Montagnais-Naskapi	Western Cree (cont'd)	Attikamek	Cree-Montagnais-Naskapi cree1271	Atikamekw atik1240		r	k	š	ē		
atj Atikamekw (Nehirâmowin)		atj Atikamekw	wemo Wemotaci	62-ADA-c; Atikamekw	62-ADA-cb; Wemotaci		Cree-Montagnais-Naskapi	Western Cree (cont'd)	Attikamek	Cree-Montagnais-Naskapi cree1271	Atikamekw atik1240		r	k	š	ē		
atj Atikamekw (Nehirâmowin)		atj Atikamekw	optc Opitciwan	62-ADA-c; Atikamekw	62-ADA-cc; Opitciwan		Cree-Montagnais-Naskapi	Western Cree (cont'd)	Attikamek	Cree-Montagnais-Naskapi cree1271	Atikamekw atik1240		r	k	š	ē		

== Contact languages ==
Cree is also a component language in at least five contact languages: Michif, Northern Michif, Bungi, Oji-Cree, and Nehipwat. Michif and Bungi are spoken by members of the Métis, and historically by some Voyageurs and European settlers of Western Canada and in parts of the Northern United States. Nehipwat and Oji-Cree are blends of Cree with Assiniboine (Nehipwat) and Ojibwe (Oji-Cree).

Michif is a mixed language which combines Cree with French. For the most part, Michif uses Cree verbs, question words, and demonstratives while using French nouns. Michif is unique to the Canadian prairie provinces as well as to North Dakota and Montana in the United States. Michif is still spoken in central Canada and in North Dakota.

Bungi is a creole based on Scottish English, Scots, Scottish Gaelic, Cree, and Ojibwe. Some French words have also been incorporated into its lexicon. This language flourished at and around the Red River Settlement (the modern-day location of Winnipeg, Manitoba) by the mid- to late-1800s. Bungi is now virtually extinct, as its features are being abandoned in favour of standard English.

Cree has also been incorporated into another mixed language within Canada, Nehipwat, which is a blending of Cree with Assiniboine. Nehipwat is found only in a few southern Saskatchewan reserves and is now nearing extinction. Nothing is known of its structure.

== History ==
Cree is believed to have begun as a dialect of the Proto-Algonquian language spoken between 2,500 and 3,000 years ago in its linguistic homeland, an undetermined area thought to be near the Great Lakes. Speakers of the proto-Cree language are thought to have moved north and quickly diverged into two groups on either side of James Bay. The eastern group then began to diverge into separate dialects, whereas the western grouping probably broke into distinct dialects much later. After this point it is very difficult to make definite statements about how different groups emerged and moved around, because there are no written works in the languages to compare, and descriptions by Europeans are not systematic; as well, Algonquian people have a tradition of bilingualism and even of outright adopting a new language from neighbours.

A traditional view among 20th-century anthropologists and historians of the fur trade posits that the Woodland Cree and the Plains Cree (and therefore their dialects) did not diverge from other Cree peoples before 1670, when the Cree expanded out of their homeland near James Bay because of access to European firearms. By contrast, James Smith of the George Gustav Heye Center stated in 1987 that the weight of archeological and linguistic evidence puts the Cree as far west as the Peace River Country of Alberta before European contact.

=== Loss of language ===
Doug Cuthand argues three reasons for the loss of the Cree language among many speakers over the nineteenth and twentieth centuries. First, residential schools cultivated the prejudice that their language was inferior. While students were still speaking their native language at home, their learning stopped at school. When they left residential schools as adults, they went home and their vocabulary and knowledge of language did not include concepts or forms that an adult speaker who had not been taken to a residential school would have.

Cuthand also argues that the loss of the Cree language can be attributed to the migration of native families away from the reserve, voluntarily or not. Oftentimes, the elders are left on the reserve. This breaks up the traditional intergenerational flow of lingual knowledge from elder to youth.

The third point Cuthand argues is that Cree language loss was adopted by the speakers. Parents stopped teaching their children their native language in the belief that doing so would help their children find economic success or avoid discrimination.

Map of Cree dialects

== Legal status ==
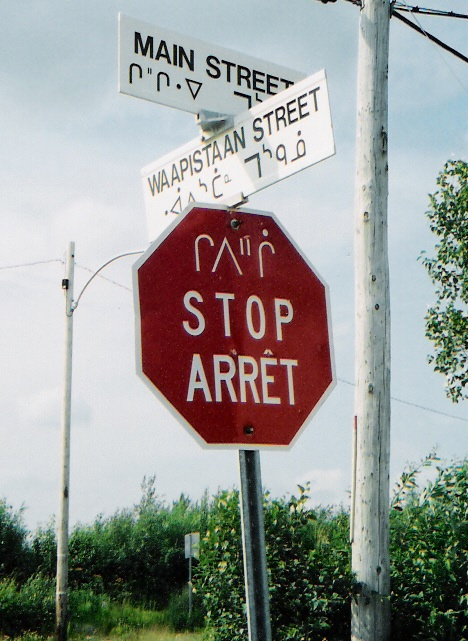
A Quebec stop sign in Cree, English and French

The social and legal status of Cree varies across Canada. Cree is one of the eleven official languages of the Northwest Territories, but is only spoken by a small number of people there in the area around the town of Fort Smith. It is also one of two principal languages of the regional government of Eeyou Istchee James Bay in Northern Quebec, the other being French.

Robert Falcon Ouellette, a Cree Member of Parliament, played a pivotal role in promoting Indigenous languages especially Cree within the Canadian Parliament and Canadian House of Commons. He was instrumental in obtaining unanimous consent from all political parties to change the standing orders to allow Indigenous languages to be spoken in the House of Commons, with full translation services provided. This historic change enabled Ouellette to deliver a speech in Cree with interpretation supported by language educator Kevin Lewis, marking the first use of an Indigenous language in the House of Commons on Jan 28, 2019.

Furthermore, Bill C-91, the Indigenous Languages Act passed in 2019, was enacted to support and revitalize Indigenous languages across Canada. This legislation, aims to reclaim, revitalize, and maintain Indigenous languages through sustainable funding and the establishment of the Office of the Commissioner of Indigenous Languages. Ouellette was the chair of the Indigenous caucus in the House of Commons and helped ensure it passage before the election of 2019.

== Support and revitalization ==
As of 2017, Cree had about 117,000 documented speakers. They are still a minority language given the dominance of English and French in Canada. There are programs in place to maintain and revitalize the language, though. In the Quebec James Bay Cree community, a resolution was put into action in 1988 that made Cree the language of education in primary schools and eventually elementary schools.

The Mistissini council decided to require their employees to learn Cree syllabics in 1991.

The Cree School Board now has its annual report available in both English and Cree.

There is a push to increase the availability of Cree stations on the radio.

In 2013, free Cree language electronic books for beginners became available for Alberta language teachers.

The Government of the Northwest Territories releases an annual report on First Nations languages. The 2016–2017 report features successes they have had in revitalizing and supporting and projects they are working on. For example, they released a Medicinal Plant Guide that had information in both Cree and English. An important part of making the guide was input from the elders. Another accomplishment was the dubbing of a movie in Cree. They are working on broadcasting a radio station that "will give listeners music and a voice for our languages".

Joshua Whitehead is one writer who has used the Cree language as part of his poetry.

== Phonology ==
Cree phonology varies between dialects. The tables below represent phonemic distinctions that do not correspond exactly to any of them.

Consonants
		Labial	Dental	Alveolar	Palatal (-alveolar)	Velar	Glottal
Nasal		m		n			
Plosive		p		t		k	
Affricate				ts	tʃ		
Fricative				s	ʃ		h
Approximant	median		ð̞	ɹ	j	w	
Approximant	lateral			l			

- Voiced obstruents [b d dz dʒ g] are observed allophonically.
  - East Cree /b/ is an exception.
- /ð̞/ is present in Woods Cree only.
- In many dialects [tʃ ʃ] are allophones of /ts s/.

Vowels
	Front		Central		Back	
	short	long	short	long	short	long
Close	i	iː			o ~ u	oː ~ uː
Mid		eː	a ~ ə		o ~ u	oː ~ uː
Open			a ~ ə	aː		

=== Orthography ===
- In dictionaries focused on Eastern Swampy Cree, Western Swampy Cree may readily substitute ⟨sh⟩ with ⟨s⟩, while Lowland Moose Cree may readily substitute ⟨ñ⟩ with their ⟨l⟩.
- In dictionaries focused on Southern Plains Cree, Northern Plains Cree may readily substitute ⟨ē⟩ with ⟨ī⟩, while materials accommodating Rocky Cree will indicate the Plains Cree [j] that is [ð] in Rocky Cree as ⟨ý⟩.
- Similarly, in dictionaries focused on Western Swampy Cree, Woods Cree may readily substitute ⟨ē⟩ with ⟨ī⟩, while materials accommodating Woods Cree will indicate the Western Swampy Cree [n] that is [ð] in Woods Cree as ⟨ń⟩.
- Atikamekw uses ⟨c⟩ [ʃ], ⟨tc⟩ [t͡ʃ], and ⟨i⟩ [j] (which also serves as ⟨i⟩ [i]).
- Eastern James Bay Cree prefers to indicate long vowels (other than [eː]) by doubling the vowel, while the western Cree use either a macron or circumflex diacritic; as [eː] is always long, often it is written as just ⟨e⟩ without doubling or using a diacritic.
- While Western Cree dialects make use of ⟨o⟩ and either ⟨ō⟩ or ⟨ô⟩, Eastern Cree dialects instead make use of ⟨u⟩ and either ⟨uu⟩, ⟨ū⟩, or ⟨û⟩.

== Writing systems ==
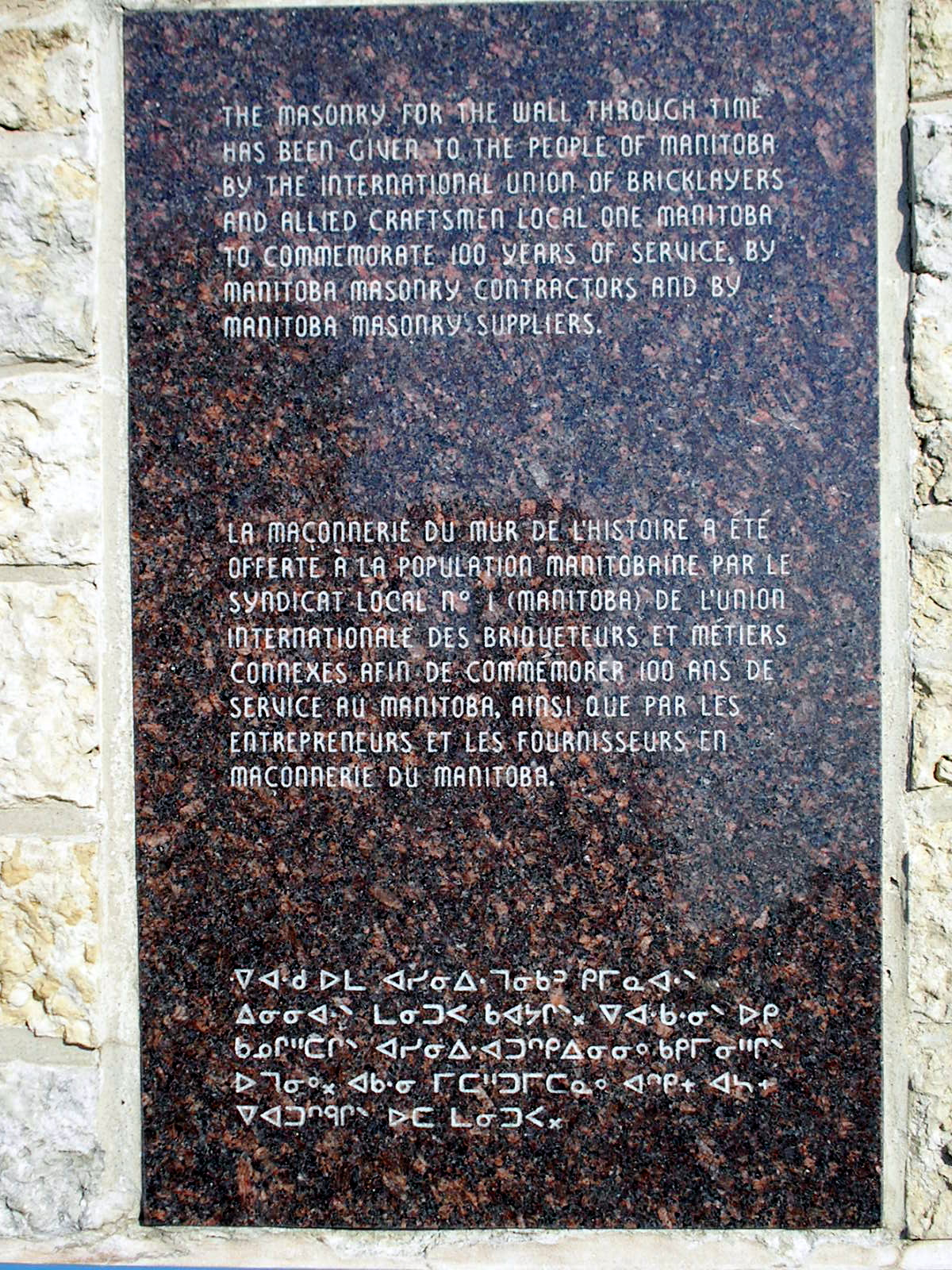
Trilingual plaque in English, French and Cree

Cree dialects, except for those spoken in eastern Quebec and Labrador, are traditionally written using Cree syllabics, a variant of Canadian Aboriginal syllabics, but can be written with the Latin script as well. Both writing systems represent the language phonetically. Cree is always written from left to right horizontally. The easternmost dialects are written using the Latin script exclusively. The dialects of Plains Cree, Woods Cree, and western Swampy Cree use Western Cree syllabics and the dialects of eastern Swampy Cree, East Cree, Moose Cree, and Naskapi use Eastern Cree syllabics.

=== Syllabics ===
In Cree syllabics, each symbol, which represents a consonant, can be written four ways, each direction representing its corresponding vowel. Some dialects of Cree have up to seven vowels, so additional diacritics are placed after the syllabic to represent the corresponding vowels. Finals represent stand-alone consonants. The Cree language also has two semivowels. The semivowels may follow other consonants or be on their own in a word.

The following tables show the syllabaries of Eastern and Western Cree dialects, respectively:

Eastern Cree syllabary
Initial	Vowels							Final
Initial	ê	i	o	a	î	ô	â	Final
	ᐁ	ᐃ	ᐅ	ᐊ	ᐄ	ᐆ	ᐋ	
p	ᐯ	ᐱ	ᐳ	ᐸ	ᐲ	ᐴ	ᐹ	ᑉ
t	ᑌ	ᑎ	ᑐ	ᑕ	ᑏ	ᑑ	ᑖ	ᑦ
k	ᑫ	ᑭ	ᑯ	ᑲ	ᑮ	ᑰ	ᑳ	ᒃ
c	ᒉ	ᒋ	ᒍ	ᒐ	ᒌ	ᒎ	ᒑ	ᒡ
m	ᒣ	ᒥ	ᒧ	ᒪ	ᒦ	ᒨ	ᒫ	ᒻ
n	ᓀ	ᓂ	ᓄ	ᓇ	ᓃ	ᓅ	ᓈ	ᓐ
s	ᓭ	ᓯ	ᓱ	ᓴ	ᓰ	ᓲ	ᓵ	ᔅ
sh	ᔐ	ᔑ	ᔓ	ᔕ	ᔒ	ᔔ	ᔖ	ᔥ
y	ᔦ	ᔨ	ᔪ	ᔭ	ᔩ	ᔫ	ᔮ	ᔾ (^{ᐤ})
l	ᓓ	ᓕ	ᓗ	ᓚ	ᓖ	ᓘ	ᓛ	ᓪ
r*	ᕃ	ᕆ	ᕈ	ᕋ	ᕇ	ᕉ	ᕌ	ᕐ
v*, f*	ᕓ	ᕕ	ᕗ	ᕙ	ᕖ	ᕘ	ᕚ	ᕝ
th*	ᕞ	ᕠ	ᕤ	ᕦ	ᕢ	ᕥ	ᕧ	ᕪ
w	ᐌ	ᐎ	ᐒ	ᐗ	ᐐ	ᐔ	ᐙ	ᐤ
h	ᐦᐁ	ᐦᐃ	ᐦᐅ	ᐦᐊ	ᐦᐄ	ᐦᐆ	ᐦᐋ	ᐦ
* Used only in foreign sounds

Western Cree syllabary
Initial	Vowels							Final
Initial	ê	i	o	a	î	ô	â	Final
	ᐁ	ᐃ	ᐅ	ᐊ	ᐄ	ᐆ	ᐋ	
p	ᐯ	ᐱ	ᐳ	ᐸ	ᐲ	ᐴ	ᐹ	ᑊ
t	ᑌ	ᑎ	ᑐ	ᑕ	ᑏ	ᑑ	ᑖ	ᐟ
k	ᑫ	ᑭ	ᑯ	ᑲ	ᑮ	ᑰ	ᑳ	ᐠ
c	ᒉ	ᒋ	ᒍ	ᒐ	ᒌ	ᒎ	ᒑ	ᐨ
m	ᒣ	ᒥ	ᒧ	ᒪ	ᒦ	ᒨ	ᒫ	ᒼ
n	ᓀ	ᓂ	ᓄ	ᓇ	ᓃ	ᓅ	ᓈ	ᐣ
s	ᓭ	ᓯ	ᓱ	ᓴ	ᓰ	ᓲ	ᓵ	ᐢ
y	ᔦ	ᔨ	ᔪ	ᔭ	ᔩ	ᔫ	ᔮ	ᐩ (ᐝ)
th	ᖧ	ᖨ	ᖪ	ᖬ	ᖩ	ᖫ	ᖭ	^{‡}
w	ᐍ	ᐏ	ᐓ	ᐘ	ᐑ	ᐕ	ᐚ	ᐤ
h	ᐦᐁ	ᐦᐃ	ᐦᐅ	ᐦᐊ	ᐦᐄ	ᐦᐆ	ᐦᐋ	ᐦ
hk								ᕽ
l	ᓬ							
r	ᕒ							

Speakers of various Cree dialects have begun creating dictionaries to serve their communities. Some projects, such as the Cree Language Resource Project, are developing an online bilingual Cree dictionary for the Cree language.

Cree syllabics has not commonly or traditionally used the period (⟨.⟩). Instead, either a full-stop glyph (⟨᙮⟩) or a double em-width space has been used between words to signal the transition from one sentence to the next.

=== Romanization ===
For Plains Cree and Swampy Cree, Standard Roman Orthography (SRO) uses fourteen letters of the ISO basic Latin alphabet to denote the dialect's ten consonants (⟨p⟩, ⟨t⟩, ⟨c⟩, ⟨k⟩, ⟨s⟩, ⟨m⟩, ⟨n⟩, ⟨w⟩, ⟨y⟩ and ⟨h⟩) and seven vowels (⟨a⟩, ⟨i⟩, ⟨o⟩, ⟨ā⟩, ⟨ī⟩, ⟨ō⟩ and ⟨ē⟩). Upper case letters are not used. For more details on the phonetic values of these letters or variant orthographies, see the § Phonology section above.

The /ð/ sound of Woods Cree is written ⟨th⟩, or ⟨ð⟩ in more recent material. Plains and Swampy material written to be cross-dialectical often modify ⟨y⟩ to ⟨ý⟩ and ⟨n⟩ to ⟨ñ⟩ when those are pronounced /ð/ in Swampy. ⟨š⟩ is used in Eastern dialects where s and š are distinct phonemes. In other dialects, s is used even when pronounced like [ʃ].

⟨l⟩ and ⟨r⟩ are used natively in Moose and Attikamek Cree, but in other dialects only for loanwords.

The stops, p, t, k, and the affricate, c, can be pronounced either voiced or unvoiced, but the symbols used for writing these sounds all correspond to the unvoiced pronunciation, e.g. ⟨p⟩ not ⟨b⟩, ⟨t⟩ not ⟨d⟩, etc. The phoneme /t͡s/ is represented by ⟨c⟩, as it is in various other languages.

Long vowels are denoted with either a macron, as in ⟨ā⟩, or a circumflex, as in ⟨â⟩. Use of either the macron or circumflex is acceptable, but usage should be consistent within a work. The vowel ē /eː/, used in southern Plains Cree, is always long and the grapheme ⟨e⟩ is never used. In northern Plains Cree the sound has merged with ī, and thus ⟨ē⟩ is not used at all.

The use of unmarked ⟨o⟩ and marked ⟨ō⟩ for the phonemes /u/ and /oː/ emphasizes the relationship that can exist between these two vowels. There are situations where o can be lengthened to ō, as for example in ᓂᑲᒧ! nikamo! 'sing (now)!' and ᓂᑲᒨᐦᑲᐣ! nikamōhkan! 'sing (later)!'.

In alphabetic writing, the use of punctuation has been inconsistent. For instance, in the Plains Cree dialect, the interrogative enclitic cî can be included in the sentence to mark a yes–no question such that this is sometimes considered to be sufficient without including a question mark (?). However, in many modern publications and text collections (cf. The Counselling Speeches of Jim Kâ-Nîpitêhtêw (1998)) full punctuation is used.

John cî kî-mîciso-w
John Q PST-eat-3SG
"Did John eat?"

Additionally, other interrogatives (where, when, what, why, who) can be used, as in other languages, and questions marks can thus be used for such questions in Cree as well.

Hyphenation can be used to separate a particle from the root word that it prefixes, especially particles that precede verbs ("preverbs" or "indeclinable preverbs") or nouns ("prenouns" or "indeclinable prenouns"). One example is māci-pīkiskwē ('start speaking!'), derived from pīkiskwē. Note that māci- can neither stand alone as a separate word, nor is it an essential part of a stem. There are some more complex situations where it is difficult to determine whether an element is a particle. Some frequently used compound words can be written as unhyphenated. Stress can be predicted in some cases based on hyphenation.

Vowel reduction or vowel dropping, as is common of unstressed short i [ɪ], is not denoted in order to be more cross-dialectal—instead of using apostrophes, the full unreduced vowels are written.

Representation of sandhi (such as oski-aya → osk-āya) can be written or not written, as sandhi representation introduces greater complexity. There are additional rules regarding h and iy that may not match a given speaker's speech, to enable a standardized transcription.

== Syntax ==
Cree features a complex polysynthetic morphosyntax. A common grammatical feature in Cree dialects, in terms of sentence structure, is non-regulated word order. Word order is not governed by a specific set of rules or structure; instead, "subjects and objects are expressed by means of inflection on the verb". Subject, Verb, and Object (SVO) in a sentence can vary in order, for example, SVO, VOS, OVS, and SOV.

Obviation is also a key aspect of the Cree language(s). In a sense, the obviative can be defined as any third-person ranked lower on a hierarchy of discourse salience than some other (proximate) discourse-participant. "Obviative animate nouns, [in the Plains Cree dialect for instance], are marked by [a suffix] ending –a, and are used to refer to third persons who are more peripheral in the discourse than the proximate third person". For example:

Sam wâpam-ew Susan-a
Sam see-3SG Susan-3OBV
"Sam sees Susan."

The suffix -a marks Susan as the obviative, or 'fourth' person, the person furthest away from the discourse.

The Cree language has grammatical gender in a system that classifies nouns as animate or inanimate. The distribution of nouns between animate or inanimate is not semantically transparent, which means gender must be learned along with the noun.

As is common in polysynthetic languages, a Cree word can be very long, and express something that takes a series of words in English. For example:

kiskinohamātowikamikw
know.CAUS.APPL.RECP.place
'school' (lit. 'knowing-it-together-by-example place')

This means that changing the word order in Cree can place emphasis on different pieces of the sentence. Wolfart and Carroll give the following example by transposing the two Cree words:

- kakwēcimēw kisēýiniwa → 'He asked the old man.'
- kisēýiniwa kakwēcimēw → 'It was the old man he asked.'

== See also ==
- Cree people

== Bibliography ==
- Ahenakew, Freda (1987). Cree Language Structures: A Cree Approach. Pemmican Publications. ISBN 0-919143-42-3.
- Ahenakew, Freda (1984). Text-Based Grammar in Cree Language Education (MA thesis). University of Manitoba. hdl:1993/29817.
- Bakker, Peter; Papen, Robert A. (1997). "Michif: A Mixed Language based on French and Cree". In Thomason, Sarah G. (ed.). Contact Languages: A Wider Perspective. Creole Language Library. Vol. 17. Philadelphia: John Benjamins. ISBN 1-55619-172-3.
- Bloomfield, Leonard (1974). Plains Cree Texts. New York: AMS Press. ISBN 0-404-58166-8.
- Carter, Sarah (1999). Aboriginal People and Colonizers of Western Canada to 1900. Toronto: University of Toronto Press. ISBN 0-8020-7995-4.
- Castel, Robert J.; Westfall, David (2001). Castel's English–Cree Dictionary and Memoirs of the Elders Based on the Woods Cree of Pukatawagan, Manitoba. Brandon, MB: Brandon University Northern Teacher Education Program. ISBN 0-9689858-0-7.
- Dahlstrom, Amy (1991). Plains Cree Morphosyntax. Outstanding dissertations in linguistics. New York: Garland. ISBN 0-8153-0172-3.
- Ellis, C. D. (2000). Spoken Cree, Level I, west coast of James Bay. Edmonton: University of Alberta Press. ISBN 0-88864-347-0.
- Hirose, Tomio (2003). Origins of predicates evidence from Plains Cree. Outstanding dissertations in linguistics. New York: Routledge. ISBN 0-415-96779-1. OCLC 52127595.
- Junker, Marie-Odile; MacKenzie, Marguerite; Salt, Luci; Duff, Alice; Moar, Daisy; Salt, Ruth, eds. (2004–2008). "Le Dictionnaire du cri de l'Est de la Baie James sur la toile: français-cri et cri-français (dialectes du Sud et du Nord)" (in English, French, crn, and ecs). Archived from the original on October 24, 2020.
- LeClaire, Nancy; Cardinal, George; Waugh, Earle H.; Hunter, Emily (1998). Alperta Ohci Kehtehayak Nehiyaw Otwestamakewasinahikan [Alberta Elders' Cree Dictionary] (in English and Cree). Edmonton: University of Alberta Press. ISBN 0-88864-309-8.
- Okimāsis, Jean; Wolvengrey, Arok (2008). How to spell it in Cree: the Standard Roman Orthography. Miywâsin Ink. ISBN 978-0-9784935-0-9.
- Steller, Lea-Katharina (1995). "Alkalmazkodni és újat adni – avagy „accomodatio" a paleográfiában". Paleográfiai kalandozások (in Hungarian). Szentendre. ISBN 963-450-922-3.
- Wolfart, H. Christoph (1973). Plains Cree A Grammatical Study. New Series. Vol. 63, Part 5. Philadelphia: American Philosophical Society. ISBN 0-87169-635-5.
- Wolfart, H. Christoph; Ahenakew, Freda (1998). The Student's Dictionary of Literary Plains Cree. Memoir (Algonquian and Iroquoian Linguistics). Vol. 15. ISBN 0-921064-15-2.
- Wolvengrey, Arok, ed. (October 15, 2001). nēhiýawēwin: itwēwina ᓀᐦᐃᔭᐍᐏᐣ: ᐃᑗᐏᓇ [Cree: Words]. Canadian Plains Research Center. ISBN 0-88977-127-8. [Cree–English English–Cree Dictionary – Volume 1: Cree-English; Volume 2: English-Cree].
