= The Misewa Saga (novel series) =

Young Adult fiction

- The Barren Grounds (2020); The Great Bear (2021); The Stone Child (2022); The Portal Keeper (2023); The Sleeping Giant (2024); The World's End (2025)
- Author: David A. Robertson
- Cover artist: Natasha Donovan
- Country: Canada
- Language: English
- Genre: Fantasy; Middle grade fiction
- Publisher: Penguin Random House
- Published: September 8, 2020 – present
- Media type: Print (hardcover and paperback), audiobook, e-book
- No. of books: 6
- Website: www.davidrobertson.ca

The Misewa Saga is a series of six middle grade fiction fantasy novels by Canadian author David A. Robertson. The series covers the adventures of Morgan and Eli, two young Indigenous foster children who discover a magical portal that leads them to another world. The series is inspired by Narnia, but with a specific focus on Indigenous stories and culture. It is set alternately in modern-day Winnipeg, Manitoba and in the magical world of the North Country, in which the village of Misewa is the last remaining settlement. The first two books have been bestsellers, and the series has been optioned by Disney subsidiary ABC Signature.

== Name ==
Misewa is, in the novels, the name of a fictitious village, inhabited by animals that talk and walk on two legs. The glossaries to volumes 2–6 of the series gloss Misewa as "all that is", giving the pronunciation as "miss-ah-waa". The name is the Swampy Cree word often spelled misiwê, ᒥᓯᐌ (ˈmɪ.sɪˌweː) meaning "all; all over; everywhere".

== Novels ==
=== The Barren Grounds ===
The novel opens with Morgan waking up in her foster family's house in Winnipeg, Manitoba, where she has lived for two months. She lives with Eli, another Indigenous foster child, and their foster parents, James and Katie. Morgan introduces Eli to the attic in their house, where Morgan secretly spends time reading, and he starts drawing a picture of an animal walking across a snowy field. The children staple this drawing to a painted-over door in the closet, and inadvertently create a portal to Misewa.

Upon entering the portal, Morgan and Eli are discovered by Ochek, who brings them to the only surviving village in the North Country. He tells them about the man who caused them to be stuck in the White Time, or a permanent winter. Morgan and Eli help Ochek find the summer birds that create the Green Time, or summer. In the process, Ochek is shot with an arrow, whereupon he bursts into flashes of light and turns into seven stars, forming the Big Dipper, and the Green Time is restored.

=== The Great Bear ===
While Eli faces bullying in school, Morgan must decide on an important choice regarding her birth mother. The two utilize time travel and meet a young fisher who is potentially their friend from the first book — in this adventure, the group of friends must save the village which is in danger once more.

=== The Stone Child ===
Morgan tries to contact her birth-mother, Jenny Trout, only to learn that she is dead. Upset, she enters the Askí alone and falls asleep beside the Great Tree that is the portal between Askí and her foster-parents' house. Eli joins her, but likewise falls asleep. Morgan awakes to find Eli comatose, his soul stolen by the giant Mistapew. In need of help, Morgan returns to Earth and brings her friend Emily to Askí. The two girls—later joined by their old friends Arik and Mahihkan—find and kill Mistapew, who has locked Eli's soul inside a stone. Morgan frees Eli from the stone by taking it into a hastily constructed sweat lodge.

Back on Earth, Morgan and Eli convince their foster-mother to take them and Emily to Norway House to meet Morgan's birth-grandmother. While there, the trio find another portal to Askí and return there once more.

=== The Portal Keeper ===
While exploring a forest in the North Country called World's End, Eli struggles to understand his newfound power: the ability to locate powers. While he's hounded by mysterious dreams, Morgan and Emily's relationship deepens. They discover another village, with a mystery on its hands, its villagers are going missing. As they try to help the three children they must decide whom to trust and how to help.

== Characters ==
- Morgan is the primary protagonist of the novel. She is a 13-year-old girl who's grown up in foster-care and feels disconnected from her Indigenous culture prior to coming to Misewa. She likes movies and fantasy books. She is angry and maintains a tentative relationship with her foster family.
- Eli (Assini Awasis) is an 11-year-old boy who recently entered the foster-care system. He likes to draw, wears his hair in a braid, and is the foster brother to Morgan. He is Cree and feels connected to his culture.
- Katie is Morgan and Eli's foster mother who attempts to use their Indigenous culture as a way to connect.
- James is Morgan and Eli's foster father who tells jokes and fun breakfasts, which Morgan doesn't like.
- Emily is Morgan's classmate and later girlfriend. She is known for giving people nicknames and playing ice hockey.
- Mrs. Edwards is Morgan's English teacher who encourages her to try harder when writing poetry by making her re-do assignments.
- Mrs. Bignell is Morgan's art teacher who punished her for interrupting class in the first book.
- Ochek is a fisher "humanoid" from Askí which walks on two legs and speaks. He is the provider of Misewa who befriends Eli and Morgan.
- Muskwa is a bear and the leader of Misewa. He is one of three members of Council.
- Tahtakiw is a crane who betrays Misewa by helping Napéw (Mason) steal the summer birds.
- Napéw (Mason) is the antagonist of the novel who came to Misewa before Eli and Morgan, stealing the summer birds for himself and setting off an eternal winter. He is described as "just an ordinary, middle-aged white man".
- Arik is a squirrel who steals from Ochek's traps to survive. When caught, she offers to help find the summer birds to save Misewa. She becomes Morgan, Eli, and Ochek's friend.
- Miskinahk is a turtle and a member of the Misewa Council.
- Oho is an owl and a member of Misewa Council.
- Mahihkan: is a wolf who supports Napéw and is at first an enemy to Morgan and Eli. He receives redemption by saving their lives, and later helps save Eli when his soul is taken.
- Kisémanitou is the Creator who speaks to the people and animals of Misewa during important moments.
- Mistapew is a giant who moves like a ghost and steals souls. He is known as Big Foot in Morgan and Eli's world.
- Kihiw is the elder who had their soul stolen by Mistapew.
- Jenny Trout is Morgan's birth mother.
- Morgan's Kokom/Grandmother is an unnamed character.

== Reception ==
The Barren Grounds received attention from several groups, and was nominated and selected for multiple awards:

Year	Award	Result
2021	Governor General's Literary Award – Young People's Literature – Text	Nominated
2021	Panda Book Award	Nominated
2021	Silver Birch Award for Fiction	Nominated
2021	Hackmatack Children's Choice Book Award	Selection
2021	Diamond Willow Award	Finalist
2021	USBBY-CBC Outstanding International Trade Book	Honor
2021	Freedom to Read	Award
2021	National Chapter IODE Violet Downey Award	Shortlisted
2021	TD Canadian Children's Literature Award	Shortlisted
2022	Rocky Mountain Book Award	Nominated
2022	Surrey Schools Book of the Year	Nominated

The Barren Grounds and The Great Bear both received favourable reviews from Kirkus Reviews.
