= Woods Cree =

Algonquian language of Canada

- Nīhithawīwin ᓀᐦᐃᖬᐍᐏᐣ
- Native to: Canada
- Region: Northern Manitoba, Northern Saskatchewan
- Ethnicity: 53,000 Woodland Cree (1982)
- Native speakers: 1,800 (2016)
- Language family: Algic: Algonquian; Cree-Montagnais-Naskapi; Cree; Woods Cree
- Writing system: Latin, Canadian Aboriginal syllabics (Cree)

Official status
- Official language in: Northwest Territories
- Recognised minority language in: Alberta; Manitoba; Saskatchewan

Language codes
- ISO 639-3: cwd
- Glottolog: wood1236
- Linguasphere: 62-ADA-ab
- Woods Cree is classified as Vulnerable by the UNESCO Atlas of the World's Languages in Danger.

Nīhithaw / Īthiniw "Indigenous person" / "human being"
- Person: Woods: Nīhithaw ᓃᐦᐃᖬᐤ; Rocky: Īthiniw ᐁᖨᓂᐤ
- People: W: Nīhithawak ᓃᐦᐃᖬᐘᐠ; R: Īthiniwak ᐁᖨᓂᐘᐠ
- Language: W: Nīhithawīwin ᓃᐦᐃᖬᐑᐏᐣ; R: Īthiniwīwin ᐁᖨᓂᐑᐏᐣ; Hand Talk
- Country: W: Nīhithawīaskiy ᓃᐦᐃᖬᐍᐊᐢᑭᐩ; R: Īthiniwaskiy ᐁᖨᓂᐗᐢᑭᐩ

Woods Cree is an indigenous language spoken in Northern Manitoba, Northern Saskatchewan and Northern Alberta, Canada. It is part of the Cree-Montagnais-Naskapi dialect continuum. The dialect continuum has around 116,000 speakers; the exact population of Woods Cree speakers is unknown, estimated between 2,600 and 35,000.

== Classification ==
The Woods Cree language belongs to the Algic family, within the Algonquian subfamily, and the central Cree–Montagnais–Naskapi language group.

Western Cree is a term used to refer to the non-palatized Cree dialects, consisting of Northern Plains Cree, Southern Plains Cree, Woods Cree, Rock Cree, Western Swampy Cree, Eastern Swampy Cree, Moose Cree, and Atikamekw. Western Woods Cree is the term used to refer to the Cree languages west of the Hudson Bay. This includes the languages Rock Cree, western Swampy Cree, and Strongwoods or Bois Fort Cree. James G.E. Smith classified the linguistic nature of the languages of Woods Cree, northern Plains Cree, western Swampy Cree, and the extinct dialect of Misinipi or Rock Cree to all fall under the Western Woods Cree languages.

Another name for Woods Cree is Rocky Cree, translated by Rossignol (1939) from the Cree word asiniˑskaˑwiðiniwak. Rock Cree or Misinipi Cree was a "r" dialect of Cree but now have merged with Woods Cree, together as the "th" dialect of Cree spoken by the group of people geographically located at the eastern foot of the Rocky Mountains.

In Alberta, Woods Cree is also known as Bush Cree.

Precise classification of the Woods Cree language has not been sufficiently documented. Many different names and terms have been used in the description of the "th" dialect of Cree spoken in the forested area north of the Canadian prairies. A more general, all-encompassing term for this dialect is "Woodland Cree", which also refers to the cultural group living in the forested area north of the prairies. This term is used, for example, in separating the cultural groups of Cree people who live in the wooded area from the Plains Cree, who traditionally inhabited the prairies to the south.

The language portal of Canada has divided all Cree languages west of Ontario up until the Rocky Mountains into four main subgroups: Plains Cree, Swampy Cree, Moose Cree and Woods Cree. However, in referring to the Woods Cree language they use the terms Woodland and Rock interchangeably. Whether these terms are interchangeable when referring to the Cree "th" dialect however has not been explicitly determined.

== History and Geographic Distribution ==
Different sources in Canadian history texts document the area in which Woods Cree was and still is spoken today. In the early 1900s, J.B. Tyrrell, a Canadian geologist and cartographer and the editor of explorer David Thompson's work found that the people living in the area of Île-à-la-Crosse and upper Churchill River referred to themselves as Nahathaway and spoke the particular -th dialect of Woods Cree. The Hudson's Bay Company had made record of the area west of James Bay being inhabited by people speaking the -th dialect of Cree. This region of Woods Cree speakers has essentially remained the same until present.

Traditionally Woods Cree was often divided into western and eastern Woods Cree, reaching as far east as Quebec. However, the actual Woods Cree language is now determined to be spoken in the mid-northern part of Manitoba and Saskatchewan. Western Woods Cree is the category of Cree languages spoken west of the Hudson Bay and in the boreal forested area across the northern provinces of Manitoba, Saskatchewan, and Alberta.

=== Demographics ===
In 1982 SIL (Summer Institute for Languages) found that the population of Woods Cree speakers was 35,000 people. More recently the University of Regina has documented that of the approximately 75,000 speakers of Cree across in Canada, 20,000 of them live in Saskatchewan, which is the main area where Woods Cree is spoken. Not only is this finding much less than the 1982 statistic, but this estimation accounts for all types of spoken Cree, not just Woods Cree spoken in Saskatchewan - but note that the Woods Cree spoken outside of Saskatchewan is not accounted for in this statistic. According to the 2016 Canadian Census there were 1,840 individuals who identified Woods Cree as their mother tongue, and 2,665 individuals who said they had some knowledge of Woods Cree. There were also 64,050 people who identified a non-specified dialect of Cree as their mother tongue, and 86,115 who said they had some knowledge of a non-specified dialect of Cree. Some of those individuals could be Woods Cree speakers.

=== Official Status ===
Woods Cree is not an official language of any country. Speakers of Woods Cree live in and around the northern, forested area of Manitoba and Saskatchewan.

== Phonology ==
Like other western Cree languages and dialects, Woods Cree only contains seventeen different phonemes. This is a fairly small phonemic inventory for a language; for example, Canadian English distinguishes thirty-eight phonemes. The following phonemes can be found in western Cree languages and dialects: a, â /aː/, c, ê /eː/, h, i, î /iː/, k, m, n, o, ô /oː/, p, s, t, w, y /j/. Woods Cree differs only in merging ê with î (and thus decreasing the vowel inventory by one down to six distinct vowels) but adding "th" /ð/ as the reflex of Proto-Algonquian *r (and thus maintaining a distinct phoneme that the other Western dialects have lost).

=== Consonants ===
Cree Consonants
	Bilabial	Alveolar	Palatal	Velar	Glottal
Plosive	p ⟨p⟩	t ⟨t⟩	t͡s ⟨c⟩	k ⟨k⟩	
Nasal	m ⟨m⟩	n ⟨n⟩			
Fricative		s ⟨s⟩			
Approximant	w ⟨w⟩	ð ⟨th⟩ (l ⟨l⟩, r ⟨r⟩)	j ⟨y⟩		h ⟨h⟩

=== Vowels ===
An important aspect of the Cree vowel system is that the Proto Algonquian short /e/ phoneme merged with short /i/ phoneme as shown above. In Woods Cree the long /eː/ also has merged with the long /iː/ phoneme. Phonetically, these two sounds may also alternate. This results in the vowel system of Woods Cree consisting of only three long vowels /iː uː aː/ and three short vowels /i u a/ in the entire language.

=== Nonpalatalized -th ===
The distinguishing feature of Woods Cree is the use of the nonpalatalized -th sound in places where other dialects of Cree would use a different sound: for example, Plains Cree is known for using the -y phoneme. This can be demonstrated by the Cree word for 'I'. In Woods Cree the word for 'I' is nitha (IPA: [niða]) whereas in Plains Cree it would be pronounced niya (IPA: [nija], spelled ᓂᔭ in Cree orthography). A significant distinction between Woods Cree and Plains Cree has been questioned in the analysis and history of the language. Various researchers and explorers throughout history however have concluded that there is a "loss of intelligibility between Woods Cree and Plains Cree", distinguishing them as separate languages.

==== Voiced Dental Fricative patterns (ð) ====
Cree /ð/ shares features both with obstruents and sonorants. Many languages around the globe have been recorded using the /ð/ phoneme and in most of these cases this phoneme is classified as an obstruent. However, the /ð/ phoneme in spoken Woods Cree has resemblance to a sonorant phoneme. Most of the evidence demonstrated in the article even concludes that it would be more logical to classify this phoneme as a sonorant due to the following five factors: the sonorant realizations of the /ð/ phoneme, the placement of the /ð/ phoneme in the phonological inventory, the voicing patterns of this phoneme in non-word final positions, the usage of /l/ phoneme as a replacement for /ð/ phoneme in caregiver speech, and lastly the /l/ and /ð/ phoneme replacement of /r/ in English loan words. In Proto-Algonquian, the /ð/ phoneme of Woods Cree has been reconstructed as *l and, thus, also demonstrates its relation to being categorized as a sonorant. This analysis is challenged however by particular factors which show the likeness of /ð/ as an obstruent. For example, among younger speakers the /ð/ phoneme is sometimes replaced by a /t/ and voicing in word-final positions also shows that it also falls under obstruent classification. One reason for this particularly unique form of the /ð/ phoneme as explained in the article is a possible phonological shift that is occurring in Woods Cree speech due to the influence of the English phonology on the language, however, the data is inconclusive due to the endangered status of the language.

== Morphology ==
The Woods Cree morphological form follows a similar system to that of other Western Cree dialects (for example, Swampy Cree or Plains Cree). A more comprehensive examination of the Western Cree morphological system relating to Woods Cree can be found on the Swampy Cree Wikipedia page.

Cree languages are polysynthetic and can have single words that would need an entire sentence to properly be expressed in English.

For example:

ni-kî-nohtê-wâpam-âw-ak
1-PST-want-see.TA-3-PL
"I wanted to see them." (animate)

Cree is also considered to be a highly inflectional language with all of its inflection being suffixation with the exception of the four personal prefixes.

=== Third Person Indefinite Possessor ===
Woods Cree morphology follows the Western Cree system of morphology. Specific to Woods Cree is use of third person indefinite possessors than in other dialects of Cree. The Proto-Algonquian definite possessor prefix is reconstructed as *me- in Bloomfield (1946) Hamp (1976) expands on Bloomfield's analysis by finding in contrast *we- to be the definite human/animal possessor and *me- to be the indefinite possessor prefix.

As found in other dialects of Cree, the following possessor prefixes are used in Woods Cree:

- ni- referring to first person possession (in English: 'my')
- ki- referring to second person possession (in English: 'your')
- o- referring to third person definite possession (in English: 'his/her')
- mi- referring to third person indefinite possession (in English: 'someone's')

In most dialects of Cree the prefix mi- is used when describing nouns regarding an undetermined body part, clothing items, and members of kin. For example, a pair of pants (noun requiring a possessor), undetermined in whom they belong to would be preceded with the mi- prefix. In Woods Cree the mi- prefix is not applied to members of kin as well as body parts unique to animals. This difference helps demonstrate the dialect difference between Woods Cree and other types of Cree. Plains Cree, for example, does apply indefinite third person possessors when referring to kin.

=== Future Markers ===
In Pukatawagan Woods Cree, specific usage of the future markers have been determined. Woods Cree spoken in this area, like other Cree dialects, uses the future markers ka- as the second person future marker. It has been agreed that this is a reduction of the second person prefix ki- and the future marker ka-. The first person future marker na- however does not follow the same reduction patterns (combining ni- first person prefix and ka- future marker). It has determined instead to be a portmanteau realization of first person and tense categories.

==== Phono-morphological characteristics ====
In vowel initial verb stems, Woods Cree will use a vowelless variation of the personal prefixes. For example, the verb aðahwi:w 'he buries him' can use the vowelless, reduced version of the personal prefix nika- recognized as n-. The verb then becomes n-aðahwi:w 'I am burying him'. Woods Cree generally uses the connective variant (as seen below) more frequently than the reduced version, however the reduced version is recognized within the language.

Cree verbs that begin with a vowel use the two different connectors -y- and -t- to join the prefix with the verb:

ni-t-apin 'I am sitting down'
ni-y-apin 'I am sitting down

Both forms are equally acceptable. However, in Woods Cree the -y- connective is fully productive and can be used with nouns as well as verbs. This is unlike other dialects of Cree, for example, Plains Cree where the connective -t- is mainly used. In spite of using both connectives, the -t- connective is recognized to be the more common of the two. The use of -y- is also found to be in free variation with the reduced variant of the ki- prefix:

ki-y-ayamihitona:na:w 'we are talking to each other'
k-ayamina:naw 'we are talking'

In the reduced variant (as seen above in k-ayamina:naw) the initial short vowel is not lengthened as in the non-reduced variant (i.e. ki-y-ayamihitona:na:w). This reduction from ni- or ki- to the form n- or k- is unusual in the Cree language to be used in this manner. As found in Plains Cree, only o- initial verbs are allowed the free variation of using the -t- connective. Also the lengthening of the initial vowel is only allowed in o- initial stems, as seen below:

otine:w 'he takes him'
n-o:tina:w 'I take him'

When a verb beginning with a short vowel is used a trend can be seen in Woods Cree that elides the -i- vowel:

aðahwi:w 'he buries him'
n-aðahwi:w 'I am burying him'

However, when determining the context of the situation, the initial vowel of the verb stem can be lengthened to portray the specific context:

n-aðahwi:w 'I am burying him'
n-a:ðahwi:w 'I will bury him'

In Woods Cree, when combining a word ending with a short vowel with a word beginning with a short vowel, the rule of external sandhi requires the final vowel of the first word to be dropped and the initial vowel of the second word to be lengthened:

awa + iskwi:w > aw i:skwi:w 'this woman'

==== Independent/conjunct order preverbs ====
The independent order preverbs used in other dialects of Cree (Plains Cree and Swampy Cree) are ta-, kita-, and ka-. In Woods Cree ta- and kita- only occur in the conjunct order. In the independent order of Woods Cree the preverbs na- and nika- are used. The preverb ka- can be used in both the independent and conjunct orders. The preverb na- can be seen as a portmanteau morpheme, which expresses the first person future context. However, in the second person future context there is no kika- that correlates with the ka- morpheme. The independent order nika- is not commonly used in Woods Cree but is found in situations requiring repetition or clarification:

nika-pi:ha:w (after being asked to repeat comment) 'I'm going to wait for him'

The na- morpheme is classified as a portmanteau because it is a dental [n] and therefore it cannot be a reduced form of nika- when here the [n] assimilates with the following [k] ad becomes a velar nasal.

Northern Alberta Cree (not specifically Woods Cree) has also been determined to use the plural suffix -waˑw- where all other Plains Cree speakers make use of the plural suffix -ik-.

== Syntax ==
Cree is a highly inflected language and much of the syntactic expression happens within the noun or the verb itself. Due to the complex morphological characteristics of the Cree language, the syntactic word order is relatively free in comparison to many other languages. Free expression of discontinuous constituents is found in Cree, also referred to as non-configurational. For example, the sentence "the children killed some ducks" could be expressed in the following six ways:

awaˑsisak nipaheˑwak siˑsiˑpa
children killed ducks

awaˑsisak siˑsiˑpa nipaheˑwak
children ducks killed

nipaheˑwak awaˑsisak siˑsiˑpa
killed children ducks

nipaheˑwak siˑsiˑpa awaˑsisak
killed ducks children

siˑsiˑpa nipaheˑwak awaˑsisak
ducks killed children

siˑsiˑpa awaˑsisak nipaheˑwak
ducks children killed

Word order is instead used determined by information structure. Moreover, due to the extensive morphology, subject and object noun phrases can be left out completely:

nipaheˑwak ('they killed them' - omitting the subject 'children' and object 'ducks' completely)

=== Obviation ===
Cree uses three levels of 'person' categories: first person (the speaker), second person (the addressee), and third (neither speaker nor addressee). However, a characterizing aspect of Cree grammar, is that the third person is divided into third person and third person obviative, used when referring to a person who is not in direct relation to the context, sometimes called the 'fourth person'. These nouns are generally understood as being in the 'background' of the conversation whereas the proximate nouns in the conversation are the nouns that are immediately in question. Obviative nouns are marked with the suffix -a.

=== Negation ===
There are two negative markers in Cree: namoˑya or nama and eˑkaˑ or eˑkaˑya. These different negative markers are found in general to coincide with main and subordinate clauses, where namoˑya is used in main clauses and eˑkaˑ is used in subordinate clauses. The eˑkaˑya marker is found to be connected with imperative sentences.

=== Questions ===
When asking a yes–no question in Cree, the question marker ciˑ is found at the end of the first word of the clause.

For example:

kikisiwahitin ciˑ? ('Have I made you angry?)

Indirect yes–no questions use a specific conditional marker equivalent to the English word 'if'. In the Plains Cree dialect (lack of Woods Cree documentation) the conditional marker is kiˑspin.

When asking a content question in Cree, the interrogative pronoun is usually found at the start of the sentence.

For example:

taˑniteˑ eˑ-wiˑ-itohteˑyan? ('Where are you going to?)

Indirect content questions will use the same interrogative pronouns.

=== Pronouns ===
The two syntactical pronoun forms are interrogative pronouns and demonstrative pronouns.

Interrogative pronouns are also used in Cree to ask direct questions. Commonly used are the following: who = awína, what = kikway, when = tánispihk, where = tániti, and why = táníhki. However, these words change form when describing singular versus plural nouns. For example: singular = awína and kikway versus plural = awíniki and kikwaya. The animacy of the noun also affects the interrogative pronoun creating four different words that are used when asking a question:

Animate	Inanimate	English
Singular		
tániwa	tániwí	where is he/she/it?
tána	tánima	which one?
Plural		
tániwíyák	tániwíhá	where are they?
tániki	tánihi	which one?

Demonstrative pronouns have two separate forms depending on whether the noun animate or inanimate is:

Animate		Inanimate	
Singular	Plural	Singular	Plural
awa this	óki these	óma this	óhi these
ana that	aniki those	anima that	anihi those
níhí that in the distance	níki those in the distance	níma that in the distance	níhi those in the distance

In Cree, it is possible to put two demonstrative pronouns together to be very specific about the location of an object. A third form of demonstrative denotes an (in)animate subject/object that is far in the distance: níhí (singular animate) níki (plural animate) and níma (singular inanimate) níhi (plural inanimate).

== Vocabulary ==
Due to the polysynthetic nature of the Cree language many words in Cree appear to be very long to other less morphologically expressive languages. For example, in Cree the word tîwâpôhkêwin would be translated in English as 'the making of tea'. Cree vocabulary is then extremely expansive. However, the following terms and phrases give a good impression of the Woods Cree dialectal form of making words:

Woods Cree	English
tānisi	Hello
tānisi ikwa kī**th**a	How are you?
namwāc nānitaw	I am fine
tawāw pihtokī	Come in(side)
tīniki	Thank you
tānisi kititahkamikisisn	What are you doing?
kisāstīw	It is hot (weather)
**th**ōtin	It is windy
kimowan	It is raining
wāsīskwan	It is clear
otāpānāsk	car/vehicle
pimi**th**ākan	plane
ōsi	boat (with motor)
piyak	one
nīso	two
nisto	three
mi**th**wī**th**ihtam	He/she is happy
pakwātam	He/she is sad
pimohtīw	He/she is walking
nipāw	He/she is sleeping
kīwīw	He/she is going home
ayamiw	He/she is talking
nikamow	He/she is singing
mīcisow	He/she is eating

In the above chart, the bolded letters show the dialect specific th- (/ð/) sound in Woods Cree. In other dialects of Cree this phoneme would be replaced by a different phoneme (such as /y/ in Plains Cree). The letters with a line above them (ō, ā, ī) represent the long vowels, where as the regular letters (o, a, i) represent the short vowel version.

All above listed vocabulary was found at the following website:

http://www.giftoflanguageandculture.ca/flash.htm

This website is designed using digital flash cards to help learn different simple but useful terms and phrases in the 'th' dialect.

== Writing System ==
The writing system and most effective way of writing of Woods Cree is the Cree syllabic system, created by missionary James Evans during the 1830s. The syllabic writing system, however, is slowly being replaced by Roman orthography due to the language being taught in Canadian school systems and especially universities.

The following chart displays the Woods Cree syllabic chart:

Syllable Vowels (Nucleus)→	ī	i	o	ō	a	ā	
Syllable Consonants (Onset)↓	ᐁ	ᐃ	ᐅ	ᐆ	ᐊ	ᐋ	Final Consonants (Coda)↓
w	ᐍ	ᐏ	ᐅᐧ	ᐕ	ᐘ	ᐚ	ᐤ
p	ᐯ	ᐱ	ᐳ	ᐴ	ᐸ	ᐹ	ᑊ
t	ᑌ	ᑎ	ᑐ	ᑑ	ᑕ	ᑖ	ᐟ
k	ᑫ	ᑭ	ᑯ	ᑰ	ᑲ	ᑳ	ᐠ
c	ᒉ	ᒋ	ᒍ	ᒎ	ᒐ	ᒑ	ᐨ
m	ᒣ	ᒥ	ᒧ	ᒨ	ᒪ	ᒫ	ᒼ
n	ᓀ	ᓂ	ᓄ	ᓅ	ᓇ	ᓈ	ᐣ
s	ᓭ	ᓯ	ᓱ	ᓲ	ᓴ	ᓵ	ᐢ
y	ᔦ	ᔨ	ᔪ	ᔫ	ᔭ	ᔮ	ᕀ
th/ð-	ᖧ	ᖨ	ᖪ	ᖫ	ᖬ	ᖭ	ᙾ
↓ Syllable Medial						l	ᓬ
w	ᐧ (Note: Unicode contains precomposed characters for all syllabics with a medial /w/, for example ᑵ (kwī) is a single code point: U+1475 CANADIAN SYLLABICS WEST-CREE KWE), however the Unified Canadian Aboriginal Syllabics block separately encodes a middle dot glyph for syllabics, U+1427 CANADIAN SYLLABICS FINAL MIDDLE DOT. Although this glyph can be used to represent the middle-dot standalone, its name containing the word "FINAL" (syllabic coda) as well as its general category of Lo, or Letter, other makes it unsuitable to encode the medial-w as diacritical mark.)					r	ᕒ
Example:						h	ᐦ
kwī	ᑵ					hk	ᕁ

The basic syllable structure of Woods Cree is (C)(w)V(C)(C) where /h/ will never occur at the beginning or end of syllables and words.

The following examples are of a text called "Encounters with bears" spoken by Mrs. Janet Feitz and transcribed into Woods Cree syllabics as well as the Roman orthography:

Pointed Syllabics	Unpointed Syllabics	Roman Orthography
ᐁᑿ ᐆᒪ ᐯᔭᒁᐤ ᐁ ᑫᓯᑳᐠ ᐁ ᑫ ᓈᑕᖬᐯᔮᐣ, ᐁᒁᓂ ᐁᑿ ᓂᑲᐹᐣ, ᐁ ᐅᓭᐦᐊᒁᐤ ᑭᓄᓭᐘᐠ, ᐁᑿ ᑳ ᓂᑕᐏ ᐊᑯᑕᒁᐤ ᐁᑿ ᐊᒁᐚᓂᓯᕁ, ᐁ ᐍ ᐊᔭ ᐍᐢᑿᔁᒁᐤ, ᓇᒣᐢᑎᑿᐠ ᐁ ᐍ ᐅᓭᐦᐊᒁᐤ᙮ ᐁᒁᓂ ᐁᑿ ᓂᐱᒪᐦᑲᒥᑭᓯᐣ ᑭᓄᓭᐘᐠ ᐁ ᐅᓭᐦᐊᒁᐤ, ᐁᑿ ᓈᓯᐯᑎᒥᕁ ᒫᑲ ᐏᖬ ᐆᒪ ᑳ ᐃᑕᐦᑲᒥᑭᓯᔮᐣ᙮ ᑫᑕᐦᑕᐍ ᑳ ᐯ ᓈᓯᐯᐸᐦᑖᐟ ᐁᑿ ᐊᐘ ᓂᒉᒥᓯᐢ, ᐁ ᐋᐸᓵᐱᐟ ᒫᓇ ᐃᑌ ᑳ ᐅᐦᒋᐸᐦᑖᐟ, ᐁᑯᑌ ᐁ ᐃᑖᐱᐟ, ᐁ ᓭᑭᓯᐟ, ᐁᑯᑕ ᑭᓯᐚᐠ ᐯ ᐊᐱᐤ ᐃᑕ ᐆᒪ ᑲ ᐅᓭᐦᐃᑭᓄᓭᐍᔮᐣ, ᒣᒋᓱᐏᓈᐦᑎᐠ ᐁ ᐊᔮᐠ ᓀᓯᐯᑎᒥᕁ, ᐁᑯᑕ ᐆᒪ ᑳ ᐅᓭᐦᐊᒁᐤ ᑭᓄᓭᐘᐠ᙮ ᐁᑿ ᐆᒪ ᓂᑯᐢᐱᐣ ᐁᑿ ᓂᐍᒉᐚᐤ, ᒥᑐᓂ ᑯᐢᑖᒋᐤ, ᓇᒹᐨ ᑫᒁᕀ ᓂᐚᐸᐦᑌᐣ ᐊᓂᒪ ᑳ ᑯᐢᑕᕁ, ᐁᒁᓂ ᐁᑿ, ᓂᒐᒁᐚᓂᓯᕁ ᓂᑎᑐᐦᑖᐣ, ᓂᑕᑯᑖᐘᐠ ᐁᑿ ᐆᑯ ᓂᑭᓄᓭᒪᐠ ᑳ ᐍᐢᑿᔁᒁᐤ—ᐁ ᑫ ᐴᓇᒫᐣ ᐍᖬ ᒣᓇ ᐱᑕᒫ᙮ ᐁᒁᓂ ᐁᑿ ᓂᐯᐦᑐᒁᐣ ᐁᑿ, ᐚᐢᑲᐦᐃᑲᓂᓯᕁ ᐁᑯᑌ ᐁᑿ ᒣᓇ ᓂᐱᒪᐦᑲᒥᑭᓯᐣ᙮ ᐋᐢᑲᐤ ᓂᐘᖬᐚᐣ ᐁ ᓂᑕᐏ ᐴᓇᒫᐣ᙮ ᐁᑿ ᐆᒪ ᐁ ᐊᔨᑕᐦᑲᒥᑭᓯᔮᐣ, ᓂᑕᑎ ᐁᑿ ᐋᐱᐦᑖ ᑫᓯᑲᓂ ᒣᒋᓱᐣ, ᐁᒁᓂ ᐁᑿ ᓂᑎᑐᐦᑖᐣ ᐃᑕ ᑳ ᐍᐢᑿᔁᒁᐤ ᑭᓄᓭᐘᐠ, ᓂᐴᓇᓯᐣ, ᓇᒨᖬ ᒥᐢᑕᐦᐃ ᓂᐴᓀᐣ, ᐍᖬ ᐆᒪ ᐁ ᐃᑌᖨᐦᑕᒫᐣ ᐁᑿ ᐁ ᐍ ᑲᐏᓯᒧᐚᐣ ᐁᑿ ᐁ ᐍ ᐊᖨᐍᐱᔮᐣ᙮ ᐁᒁᓂ ᐁ ᑫ ᐴᓇᓯᔮᐣ, ᐁᒁᓂ ᓂᐯᐦᑕᑿᐣ ᐁᑿ, ᐁᒁᓂ ᐁᑿ ᓂᑲᐏᓯᒧᐣ ᐁ ᐸ ᐱᒥᓯᓂᔮᐣ ᐁ ᐊᔭᒥᐦᒋᑫᔮᐣ, ᑫᑕᐦᑕᐍ ᐁᑿ ᒫᑲ ᐊᐘ ᓂᒉᒥᓯᐢ, ᓲᐢᒁᐨ ᐁᑿ ᑿᔭᐢᐠ ᒥᑭᓯᒧᐤ, ᑿᔭᐢᐠ ᐁ ᑯᐢᑖᒋᐟ᙮ ᐁᒁᓂ ᓂᑌᑇᑖᐤ ᐁᑿ, "ᐴᓊᐏᑕ"᙮	ᐁᑿ ᐅᒪ ᐯᔭᑿᐤ ᐁ ᑫᓯᑲᐠ ᐁ ᑫ ᓇᑕᖬᐯᔭᐣ, ᐁᑿᓂ ᐁᑿ ᓂᑲᐸᐣ, ᐁ ᐅᓭᐊᑿᐤ ᑭᓄᓭᐘᐠ, ᐁᑿ ᑲ ᓂᑕᐏ ᐊᑯᑕᑿᐤ ᐁᑿ ᐊᑿᐊᓂᓯᕁ, ᐁ ᐍ ᐊᔭ ᐍᐢᑿᔁᑿᐤ, ᓇᒣᐢᑎᑿᐠ ᐁ ᐍ ᐅᓭᐊᑿᐤ᙮ ᐁᑿᓂ ᐁᑿ ᓂᐱᒪᑲᒥᑭᓯᐣ ᑭᓄᓭᐘᐠ ᐁ ᐅᓭᐊᑿᐤ, ᐁᑿ ᓇᓯᐯᑎᒥᕁ ᒪᑲ ᐏᖬ ᐅᒪ ᑲ ᐃᑕᑲᒥᑭᓯᔭᐣ᙮ ᑫᑕᑕᐍ ᑲ ᐯ ᓇᓯᐯᐸᑕᐟ ᐁᑿ ᐊᐘ ᓂᒉᒥᓯᐢ, ᐁ ᐊᐸᓴᐱᐟ ᒪᓇ ᐃᑌ ᑲ ᐅᒋᐸᑕᐟ, ᐁᑯᑌ ᐁ ᐃᑕᐱᐟ, ᐁ ᓭᑭᓯᐟ, ᐁᑯᑕ ᑭᓯᐘᐠ ᐯ ᐊᐱᐤ ᐃᑕ ᐅᒪ ᑲ ᐅᓭᐃᑭᓄᓭᐍᔭᐣ, ᒣᒋᓱᐏᓇᑎᐠ ᐁ ᐊᔭᐠ ᓀᓯᐯᑎᒥᕁ, ᐁᑯᑕ ᐅᒪ ᑲ ᐅᓭᐊᑿᐤ ᑭᓄᓭᐘᐠ᙮ ᐁᑿ ᐅᒪ ᓂᑯᐢᐱᐣ ᐁᑿ ᓂᐍᒉᐘᐤ, ᒥᑐᓂ ᑯᐢᑕᒋᐤ, ᓇᒷᐨ ᑫᑲᕀ ᓂᐘᐸᑌᐣ ᐊᓂᒪ ᑲ ᑯᐢᑕᕁ, ᐁᑿᓂ ᐁᑿ, ᓂᒐᑿᐘᓂᓯᕁ ᓂᑎᑐᑕᐣ, ᓂᑕᑯᑕᐘᐠ ᐁᑿ ᐅᑯ ᓂᑭᓄᓭᒪᐠ ᑲ ᐍᐢᑿᔁᑿᐤ—ᐁ ᑫ ᐳᓇᒪᐣ ᐍᖬ ᒣᓇ ᐱᑕᒪ᙮ ᐁᑿᓂ ᐁᑿ ᓂᐯᑐᑿᐣ ᐁᑿ, ᐘᐢᑲᐃᑲᓂᓯᕁ ᐁᑯᑌ ᐁᑿ ᒣᓇ ᓂᐱᒪᑲᒥᑭᓯᐣ᙮ ᐊᐢᑲᐤ ᓂᐘᖬᐘᐣ ᐁ ᓂᑕᐏ ᐳᓇᒪᐣ᙮ ᐁᑿ ᐅᒪ ᐁ ᐊᔨᑕᑲᒥᑭᓯᔭᐣ, ᓂᑕᑎ ᐁᑿ ᐊᐱᑕ ᑫᓯᑲᓂ ᒣᒋᓱᐣ, ᐁᑿᓂ ᐁᑿ ᓂᑎᑐᑕᐣ ᐃᑕ ᑲ ᐍᐢᑿᔁᑿᐤ ᑭᓄᓭᐘᐠ, ᓂᐳᓇᓯᐣ, ᓇᒧᖬ ᒥᐢᑕᐃ ᓂᐳᓀᐣ, ᐍᖬ ᐅᒪ ᐁ ᐃᑌᖨᑕᒪᐣ ᐁᑿ ᐁ ᐍ ᑲᐏᓯᒧᐘᐣ ᐁᑿ ᐁ ᐍ ᐊᖨᐍᐱᔭᐣ᙮ ᐁᑿᓂ ᐁ ᑫ ᐳᓇᓯᔭᐣ, ᐁᑿᓂ ᓂᐯᐦᑕᑿᐣ ᐁᑿ, ᐁᑿᓂ ᐁᑿ ᓂᑲᐏᓯᒧᐣ ᐁ ᐸ ᐱᒥᓯᓂᔭᐣ ᐁ ᐊᔭᒥᒋᑫᔭᐣ, ᑫᑕᑕᐍ ᐁᑿ ᒪᑲ ᐊᐘ ᓂᒉᒥᓯᐢ, ᓱᐢᑿᐨ ᐁᑿ ᑿᔭᐢᐠ ᒥᑭᓯᒧᐤ, ᑿᔭᐢᐠ ᐁ ᑯᐢᑕᒋᐟ᙮ ᐁᑿᓂ ᓂᑌᑅᑕᐤ ᐁᑿ, "ᐳᓊᐏᑕ"᙮	Īkwa ōma pīyakwāw ī-kīsikāk ī-kī-nātaðapīyān, īkwāni īkwa nikapān, ī-osīhakwāw kinosīwak, īkwa kā-nitawi-akotakwāw īkwa akwāwānisihk, ī-wī-aya-wīskwaswakwāw, nimīstikwak ī-wī-osīhakwāw. Īkwāni īkwa nipimahkamikisin kinosīwak ī-osīhakwāw, īkwa nāsipītimihk māka wiða ōma kā-itahkamikisiyān. Kītahtawī kā-pī-nāsipīpahtāt īkwa awa nicīmisin, ī-āpasāpit māna itī kā-ohcipahtāt, īkotī ī-itāpit, ī-sīpisit, īkota kisiwāk pī-apiw ita ōma ka-osīhikinosīwīyān, mīcisowināhtik ī-ayāk nīsipītimihk, īkota ōma kā-osīhakwāw kinosīwak. Īkwa ōma nikospin īkwa niwīcīwāw, mitoni kostāciw, nimwāc kīkwāy niwāpahtīn anima kā-kostahk, īkwāni īkwa, nacakwāwānisihk nititohtān, nitakotāwak īkwa ōko nikinosīmak kā-wīskwaswakwāw—ī-kē-pōnamān wiða mīna pitamā. Īkwāni īkwa nipīhtokwān īkwa, wāskahikanisihk īkotī īkwa mīna nipimahkamikisin. Āskaw niwaðawān ī-nitawi-pōnamān. Īkwa ōma ī-ayitahkamikisiyān, nitati īkwa āpihtā kīsikani mīcison, īkwāni īkwa nititohtān ita kā-wīskwaswakwāw kinosīwak, nipōnasin, namōða mistahi nipōnīn, wīða ōma ī-itīðihtamān īkwa ī-wī-kawisimowān īkwa ī-wī-aðiwīpiyān. Īkwāni ī-kī-pōnasiyān, īkwāni nipīhtokwān īkwa, īkwāni īkwa nikawisimon ī-pa-pimisiniyān ī-ayamihcikīyān, kītahtawī īkwa māka awa nicīmisin, sōskwāc īkwa kwayask mikisimow, kwayask ī-kostācit. Īkwāni nitīpwātāw īkwa, "pōnwīwita."
