= Ahenakew =

Ahenakew is a Cree surname. Notable people with the surname include:

- Freda Ahenakew (1932–2011), Canadian anthropologist
- David Ahenakew (1933–2010), Assembly of First Nations chief
