= Plains Cree =

Plains Cree may refer to:

- Plains Cree language
- Plains Cree people
