= Western Cree syllabics =

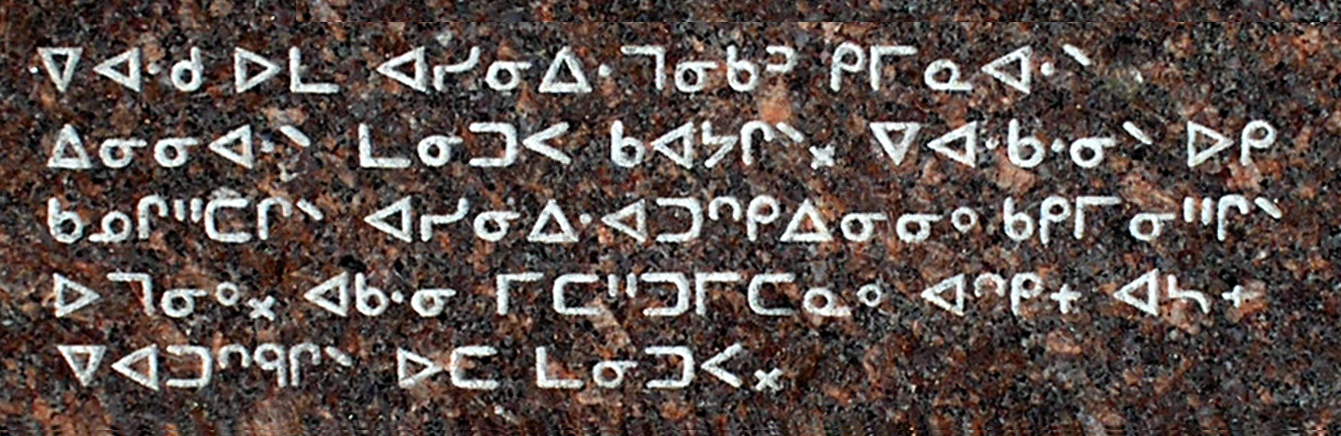
- Script type: Abugida
- Period: 1840s-present
- Languages: Plains Cree, Woods Cree, western dialects of Swampy Cree

Related scripts
- Parent systems: Devanagari, Pitman Shorthand (disputed): Western Cree syllabics
- Child systems: Eastern Cree, Blackfoot, Slavey, Dogrib, Beaver, Sayisi (Chipewyan), Carrier

ISO 15924
- ISO 15924: Cans (440), Unified Canadian Aboriginal Syllabics

Unicode
- Unicode alias: Canadian Aboriginal
- Unicode range: Unified Canadian Aboriginal Syllabics, U+1400–167F (chart)

Western Cree syllabics are a variant of Canadian Aboriginal syllabics used to write Plains Cree, Woods Cree and the western dialects of Swampy Cree. It is used for all Cree dialects west of approximately the Manitoba–Ontario border in Canada, as opposed to Eastern Cree syllabics. It is also occasionally used by a few Cree speakers in the United States.

== Phonology of languages using Western Cree syllabics ==
Western syllabics use only those characters needed to write the phonemes of the western dialects. The table below demonstrates the phonemes present in Western Cree dialects. Each sound is presented with a transcription in the International Phonetic Alphabet along with the characters used to represent the sound in the Standard Roman Orthography used to teach Plains Cree.

Consonant phonemes in Western Cree
	Bilabial	Dental	Alveolar	Palatal	Velar	Glottal
Nasal	m ⟨m⟩		n ⟨n⟩			
Plosive (Note: Plosives are never aspirated. For example in Western Cree /p/ is always [p] contrasting with English where /p/ can be [pʰ] or [p] depending on the surrounding context.)	p ⟨p⟩	t ⟨t⟩	t͡s ⟨c⟩		k ⟨k⟩	
Fricative			s ⟨s⟩			h ⟨h⟩
Approximant		ð (Note: The phoneme /ð/ is only present in Woods Cree.) ⟨th⟩	ɹ (Note: /l/ and /ɹ/ are not native to Western Cree and only appear in loan words. Nevertheless there are characters dedicated to these sounds.) ⟨r⟩	j ⟨y⟩	w ⟨w⟩	
Lateral			l ⟨l⟩			

Standard Roman Orthography consonants sound for the most part like their English equivalents. The key differences being that /p/ and /t/ are never aspirated and that the letter ⟨c⟩ is used to represent /t͡s/.

Western Cree dialects have between 6 and 7 vowels distinguishing between short and long vowels. Short vowels are written standard Latin characters while long vowels are written either with a macron or a circumflex. /eː/, written ⟨ê⟩ is always long and has no short counterpart.

Vowels in Western Cree
	Short			Long		
	Front	Central	Back	Front	Central	Back
Close				iː (Note: In Woods Cree, /eː/ has merged with /iː/. Only six vowels total, three long and three short, are used in that dialect.) ⟨î⟩		oː~uː ⟨ô⟩
Near-close	ɪ ⟨i⟩		o~ʊ ⟨o⟩			oː~uː ⟨ô⟩
Mid		ə ⟨a⟩	o~ʊ ⟨o⟩	eː ⟨ê⟩		oː~uː ⟨ô⟩
Open					aː ⟨â⟩	

== Inventory ==
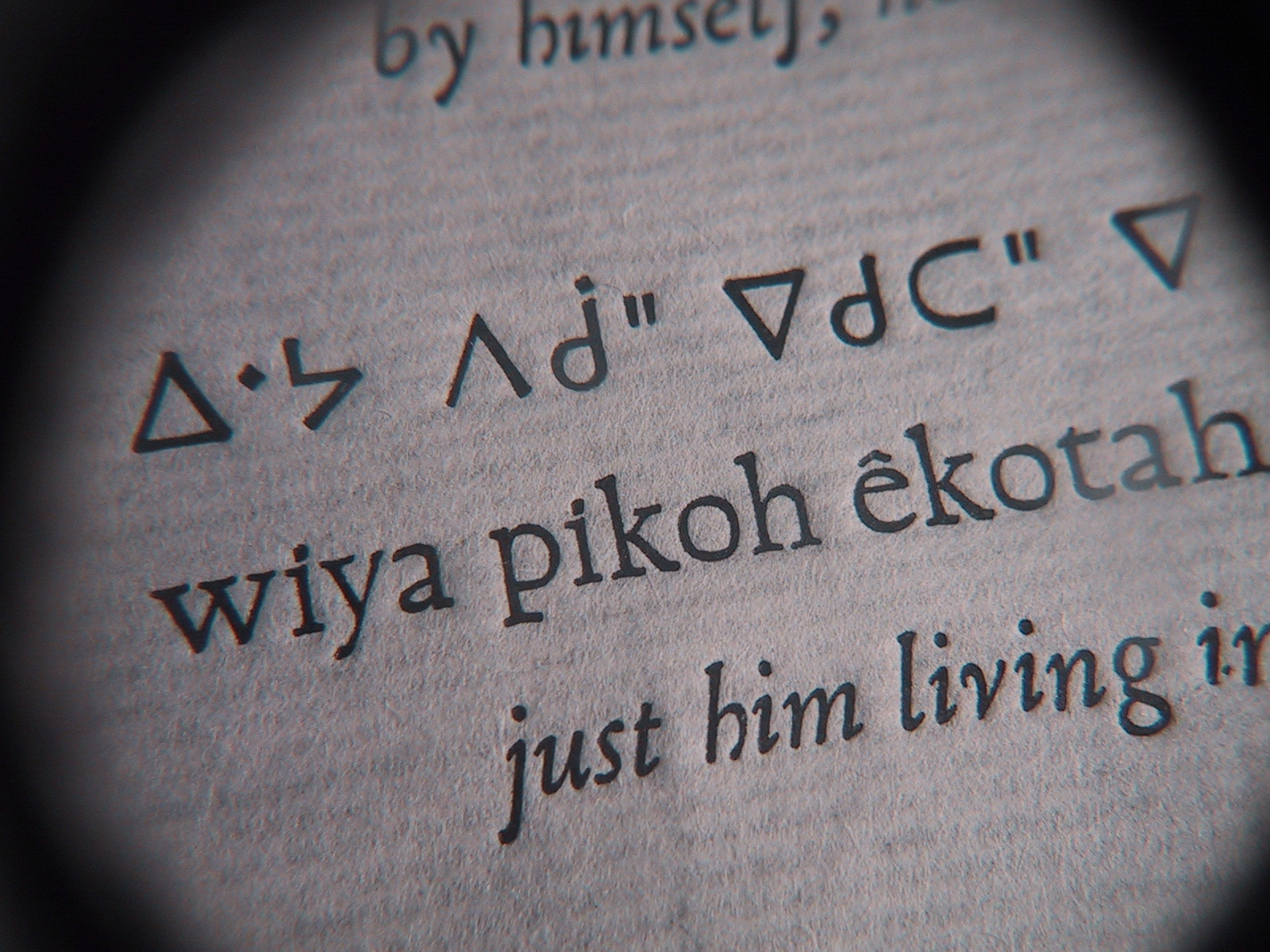
A proof from freshly made Cree typeface

Cree syllabics uses different glyphs to indicate consonants, and changes the orientation of these glyphs to indicate the vowel that follows it. The basic principles of Canadian syllabic writing are outlined in the article for Canadian Aboriginal syllabics.

Western Cree syllabic character table
Initial	Vowels							Final
Initial	ê (Note: The vowel sound ê has merged with î in Woods Cree. In this dialect, syllables containing the vowel î are written with the ê-series characters. For example, ᑫ is /kê/ in Plains Cree, but /kî/ in Woods Cree. Consequently, the î-series is not usually written in Woods Cree.)	i	o	a	î	ô	â	Final
	ᐁ	ᐃ	ᐅ	ᐊ	ᐄ	ᐆ	ᐋ	
p	ᐯ	ᐱ	ᐳ	ᐸ	ᐲ	ᐴ	ᐹ	ᑊ
t	ᑌ	ᑎ	ᑐ	ᑕ	ᑏ	ᑑ	ᑖ	ᐟ
k	ᑫ	ᑭ	ᑯ	ᑲ	ᑮ	ᑰ	ᑳ	ᐠ
c	ᒉ	ᒋ	ᒍ	ᒐ	ᒌ	ᒎ	ᒑ	ᐨ
m	ᒣ	ᒥ	ᒧ	ᒪ	ᒦ	ᒨ	ᒫ	ᒼ
n	ᓀ	ᓂ	ᓄ	ᓇ	ᓃ	ᓅ	ᓈ	ᐣ
s	ᓭ	ᓯ	ᓱ	ᓴ	ᓰ	ᓲ	ᓵ	ᐢ
y	ᔦ	ᔨ	ᔪ	ᔭ	ᔩ	ᔫ	ᔮ	ᕀ (ᐝ) (Note: Final y was originally a raised dot, but was discontinued in favour of ᕀ.)
th (Note: th-series only present in Woods Cree.)	ᖧ	ᖨ	ᖪ	ᖬ	ᖩ	ᖫ	ᖭ	ᙾ
w (Note: A dot following any syllable indicates that the vowel is preceded by a w, which comes between the initial consonant and the vowel.)	ᐍ	ᐏ	ᐓ	ᐘ	ᐑ	ᐕ	ᐚ	ᐤ
h	ᐦᐁ	ᐦᐃ	ᐦᐅ	ᐦᐊ	ᐦᐄ	ᐦᐆ	ᐦᐋ	ᐦ
hk (Note: hk is a very common consonant cluster at the end of words because it is part of the morpheme used for the locative case. It is used so frequently that it has its own final.)								ᕽ
l (Note: l and r only appear in loan words in western Cree dialects. They may appear before or after a syllable as necessary to indicate the pronunciation of the borrowed word. A Roman Catholic variant has full series for these consonants.)	ᓬ							
r	ᕒ							

Notes:

Roman Catholic additions
Initial	Vowels				Final
Initial	ê	i	o	a	Final
r	ᖊ	ᖋ	ᖌ	ᖍ	ᙆ
l	ᕃ	ᕆ	ᕊ	ᕍ	ᔆ

Note that the th-series closely resembles the y-series characters. The th phoneme in Woods Cree appears where a y is found in Plains or an n in Swampy Cree. Recognising the relationship between the th and y sounds, Cree writers use a modification of the y-series.

In addition to these characters, western Cree syllabics indicates the w phoneme by placing a dot after the syllable. (This is the reverse of the Eastern Cree convention.) Thus, the syllable wa is indicated with ᐘ, pwi by ᐽ and so on. The dot used to mark the w can be combined with the dot marking length. The syllable wâ is marked as ᐚ and pwî as ᐿ. The dot used to indicate w is placed before the syllable in Eastern Cree syllabics. This and the way finals are written are the two principal differences between eastern and western Cree syllabics.

The dot placed above syllables with long vowels is often dropped in real texts unless necessary to disambiguate the word. Long and short vowels may be written identically and require context to disambiguate.

Also, western Cree writers may use the character ᙮ to indicate the end of sentence, instead of the Roman alphabet period so that it is not confused with the diacritic indicating the w sound.

An example of Plains Cree written in western syllabics:

ᑳᒫᒋᐲᑭᐢᒁᑎᑯᐟ ᐆᐦᐃ ᐅᐢᑳᔭ ᐁᓀᐦᐃᔭᐍᔨᐟ᙮ ᒫᑲ ᓇᒨᔭ ᓂᓯᑐᐦᑕᐍᐤ ᐊᐘ ᐅᐢᑭᓂᑮᐢ ᑖᓂᓯ ᐁᐃᑘᔨᐟ ᐋᑕ ᐏᐢᑕ ᐁᓀᐦᐃᔭᐍᐟ᙮
kâ-mâci-pîkiskwâtikot ôhi oskâya ê-nêhiyawêyit. mâka namôya nisitohtawêw awa oskinikîs tânisi ê-itwêyit âta wîsta ê-nêhiyawêt.

English translation:

The young people then began to speak in the language of his ancestry – Nêhiyawêwin (Plains Cree language). Unfortunately the young man could not make out what they were saying even though he was of the same nation; Nêhiyaw (Plains Cree people).
