= H. C. Wolfart =

German-born Canadian researcher, editor, translator

H. C. Wolfart FRSC
- Born: Hans Christoph Wolfart; 1943 (age 82–83); Germany

Academic background
- Education: University of Freiburg; Yale University; Cornell University
- Thesis: An Outline of Plains Cree Morphology (1969)

Academic work
- Discipline: Linguistics
- Institutions: University of Manitoba

Hans Christoph Wolfart FRSC (born 1943) is a German-born Canadian researcher, editor, translator and Distinguished Professor of Linguistics at the University of Manitoba. He is a graduate of the University of Freiburg (German: Albert-Ludwigs-Universität Freiburg) as well as Cornell University. He completed a PhD in 1969 at Yale, and has since written and edited a corpus of over one hundred books, articles, and reference grammars. In 2008, John D. Nichols and Arden C. Ogg edited a collection of Algonquian and Iroquoian language studies in honour of Wolfart. Wolfart was made a Fellow of the Royal Society of Canada in 1995, and his 1973 thesis is still considered the definitive work of Plains Cree grammar. Over the last 20 years, Wolfart has recorded, transcribed and edited a host of culturally significant texts by Cree elders. Some of his students have included Cree linguist and cultural preservationist Freda Ahenakew, and authority on the Algonquian languages David Pentland.

== Selected bibliography ==
- Plains Cree: A Grammatical Study. American Philosophical Society, Transactions, n.s., vol. 63, pt. 5. Philadelphia, 1973. [facsimile reprint, [Saskatoon: Saskatchewan Indian Cultural College, ca. 1982]
- Meet Cree: A Guide to the Cree Language with J.F. Carroll. Revised Edition. Edmonton: University of Alberta Press / Lincoln & London: University of Nebraska Press, 1981.
- pisiskiwak kâ-pîkiskwêcik / Talking Animals Told by L. Beardy. Edited and translated by H.C. Wolfart. Algonquian and Iroquoian Linguistics, Memoir 5, 1988.
- kôhkominawak otâcimowiniwâwa / Our Grandmothers' Lives, as Told in Their Own Words. Told by Glecia Bear et al. Edited and translated by F. Ahenakew & H.C. Wolfart. Saskatoon: Fifth House Publishers, 1992. [facsimile reprint, with new preface: Canadian Plains Reprint Series, Canadian Plains Research Centre, University of Regina, 1998]
- kinêhiyâwiwininaw nêhiyawêwin / The Cree Language is Our Identity: The La Ronge Lectures of Sarah Whitecalf. Edited, translated and with a glossary by H.C. Wolfart & F. Ahenakew. Publications of the Algonquian Text Society / Collection de la Société d’édition de textes algonquiens. Winnipeg: University of Manitoba Press, 1993.
- kwayask ê-kî-pê-kiskinowâpahtihicik / Their Example Showed Me the Way: A Cree Woman's Life Shaped by Two Cultures. Told by Emma Minde. Edited, translated and with a glossary by F. Ahenakew & H.C. Wolfart. Edmonton, University of Alberta Press, 1997.
- ana kâ-pimwêwêhahk okakêskihkêmowina / The Counselling Speeches of Jim Kâ-Nîpitêhtêw. Edited, translated and with a glossary by F. Ahenakew & H.C. Wolfart. Publications of the Algonquian Text Society / Collection de la Société d’édition de textes algonquiens. Winnipeg: University of Manitoba Press, 1998.
- The Student's Dictionary of Literary Plains Cree, Based on Contemporary Texts. with F. Ahenakew. Algonquian and Iroquoian Linguistics, Memoir 15, 1998.
- âh-âyîtaw isi ê-kî-kiskêyihtahkik maskihkiy / They Knew Both Sides of Medicine: Cree Tales of Curing and Cursing Told by Alice Ahenakew. Edited, translated and with a glossary by H.C. Wolfart & Freda Ahenakew. Publications of the Algonquian Text Society / Collection de la Société d'édition de textes algonquiens. Winnipeg: University of Manitoba Press, 2000.
