= Eastern Cree syllabics =

- Script type: Abugida
- Period: 1850s-present
- Languages: East Cree, Moose Cree, Naskapi

Related scripts
- Parent systems: Western Cree: Eastern Cree syllabics
- Child systems: Ojibwe, Inuktitut

ISO 15924
- ISO 15924: Cans (440), Unified Canadian Aboriginal Syllabics

Unicode
- Unicode alias: Canadian Aboriginal
- Unicode range: Unified Canadian Aboriginal Syllabics, U+1400–167F (chart)

Eastern Cree syllabics are a variant of Canadian Aboriginal syllabics used to write all the Cree dialects from Moosonee, Ontario to Kawawachikamach on the Quebec–Labrador border in Canada that use syllabics.

Cree syllabics uses different glyphs to indicate consonants, and changes the orientation of these glyphs to indicate the vowel that follows it. The basic principles of Canadian syllabic writing are outlined in the article for Canadian Aboriginal syllabics.

In this article, Cree words and sounds will transcribed using the Standard Roman Orthography.

== Inventory ==
The primary difference between eastern and western Cree orthographies is the shape of the final consonants (consonant sounds with no following vowel). Eastern Cree dialects write finals with a superscripted a-syllabic. ᒫᔅᑰᒡ /māskōc/ has two finals, ᔅ /s/ and ᒡ /c/. Other differences are placing the diacritic for labialization (/w/) before rather than after the letter—ᑖᐺ /tāpwē/ (Western Cree ᑖᐻ),—and several additional series for consonants not found in Western Cree.

Eastern Cree syllabic character table
Initial	Vowels							Final
Initial	ê	i	o	a	ii	oo	aa	Final
	ᐁ	ᐃ	ᐅ	ᐊ	ᐄ	ᐆ	ᐋ	
p	ᐯ	ᐱ	ᐳ	ᐸ	ᐲ	ᐴ	ᐹ	ᑉ
t	ᑌ	ᑎ	ᑐ	ᑕ	ᑏ	ᑑ	ᑖ	ᑦ
k	ᑫ	ᑭ	ᑯ	ᑲ	ᑮ	ᑰ	ᑳ	ᒃ
c	ᒉ	ᒋ	ᒍ	ᒐ	ᒌ	ᒎ	ᒑ	ᒡ
m	ᒣ	ᒥ	ᒧ	ᒪ	ᒦ	ᒨ	ᒫ	ᒻ
n	ᓀ	ᓂ	ᓄ	ᓇ	ᓃ	ᓅ	ᓈ	ᓐ
s	ᓭ	ᓯ	ᓱ	ᓴ	ᓰ	ᓲ	ᓵ	ᔅ
sh	ᔐ	ᔑ	ᔓ	ᔕ	ᔒ	ᔔ	ᔖ	ᔥ
y	ᔦ	ᔨ	ᔪ	ᔭ	ᔩ	ᔫ	ᔮ	ᔾ (^{ᐤ})
r	ᕃ	ᕆ	ᕈ	ᕋ	ᕇ	ᕉ	ᕌ	ᕐ
l	ᓓ	ᓕ	ᓗ	ᓚ	ᓖ	ᓘ	ᓛ	ᓪ
v*, f*	ᕓ	ᕕ	ᕗ	ᕙ	ᕖ	ᕘ	ᕚ	ᕝ
th*	ᕞ	ᕠ	ᕤ	ᕦ	ᕢ	ᕥ	ᕧ	ᕪ
w	ᐌ	ᐎ	ᐒ	ᐗ	ᐐ	ᐔ	ᐙ	ᐤ
h	ᐦᐁ	ᐦᐃ	ᐦᐅ	ᐦᐊ	ᐦᐄ	ᐦᐆ	ᐦᐋ	ᐦ

* The glyphs for v ([v]) \ f ([f]) and th ([ð] and [θ]) are rare and used only in words borrowed from other languages. However, the Inuktitut adaptation of Eastern Cree syllabics commonly uses the Eastern Cree v \ f set as their v set.

Other finals:

- There is in Moose Cree an /sk/ final which merges into one character ᔅ /s/ and ᒃ /k/. ᐊᒥᔉ /amisk/ beaver
- The Moose Cree final /y/ is a ring written above the previous syllabic instead of the raised /ya/: ᐋᣁ /āšay/ now.
- East Cree has special finals for ᒄ /kw/ and ᒽ /mw/ which are raised versions of the o-syllabics. ᒥᔅᑎᒄ /mistikw/ tree.
- Naskapi does not mark vowel length at all and uses two dots, either placed above or before a syllable, for a w: ᐛ wa, ᐖ wo, ᑥ twa, ᒂ kwa, ᒠ cwa (/tswa/), ᒺ mwa, ᓏ nwa, ᔄ swa, ᔽ ywa. Since Naskapi s- consonant clusters are all labialized, sCw-, these also have the two dots: ᔌ spwa, etc. There is also a labialized final sequence, ᔊ -skw, which is a raised so-ko.
