= Plains Cree language =

Algonquian language spoken in North America

Plains Cree
- ᓀᐦᐃᔭᐍᐏᐣ nēhiyawēwin
- Native to: Canada, United States
- Region: Manitoba, Saskatchewan, Alberta, Montana
- Ethnicity: Plains Cree
- Native speakers: (3,200 cited 2001–2016)
- Language family: Algic: Algonquian; Cree-Montagnais-Naskapi; Cree; Plains Cree
- Writing system: Latin (Plains Cree alphabet); Canadian Aboriginal syllabics (Plains Cree syllabics)

Official status
- Official language in: Northwest Territories (Canada), as "Cree"

Language codes
- ISO 639-3: crk
- Glottolog: plai1258
- ELP: Nēhiyawēwin
- Linguasphere: 62-ADA-aa
- Plains Cree is classified as Vulnerable by the UNESCO Atlas of the World's Languages in Danger.

nêhiyaw "Indigenous person"
- Person: nêhiyaw ᓀᐦᐃᔭ
- People: nêhiyawak ᓀᐦᐃᔭᐘᐠ
- Language: nēhiyawēwin ᓀᐦᐃᔭᐍᐏᐣ isiniskêstâkêwin ᐃᓯᓂᐢᑫᐢᑖᑫᐃᐧᐣ
- Country: nêhiyawaskiy ᓀᐦᐃᔭᐘᐢᑭᐩ

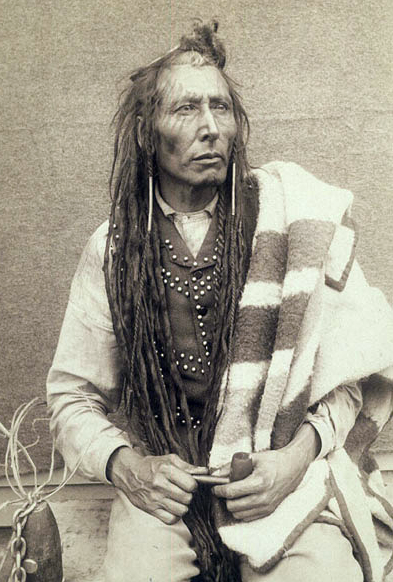
Poundmaker (c. 1842–1886), a leader of the Plains Cree and adopted by Crowfoot, chief of one of the Blackfoot Nations

Plains Cree (endonym: ᓀᐦᐃᔭᐍᐏᐣ nēhiyawēwin; alternatively: ᐸᐢᑳᐧᐃᐧᓃᒧᐃᐧᐣ paskwâwinîmowin "language of the prairie people") is a dialect of the Algonquian language Cree, the most populous Canadian indigenous language. Plains Cree is considered a dialect of the Cree-Montagnais language or a dialect of the Cree language that is distinct from the Montagnais language. Plains Cree is one of five main dialects of Cree in this second sense, along with Woods Cree, Swampy Cree, Moose Cree, and Atikamekw. Although no single dialect of Cree is favored over another, Plains Cree is the one that is the most widely used. Out of the 116,500 speakers of the Cree language, the Plains Cree dialect is spoken by about 34,000 people primarily in Saskatchewan and Alberta but also in Manitoba and Montana.

The number of people who can speak an Aboriginal language, such as Plains Cree, has increased. For example, in the 2016 census, 263,840 people could speak an Aboriginal language well enough to conduct a conversation. From 1996 to 2016, the total number of people who were able to speak an Aboriginal language went up by 8%. The number of Plains Cree speakers similarly has increased along with population increases over the past 20 years.

== Phonology ==
=== Consonants ===
The consonant inventory of Plains Cree contains 10 or 11 sounds. This includes the semi-vowels /w/ and /j/, which are glides that act like and often follow consonants.

The consonants of Plains Cree in the two standard writing systems, Cree syllabics and the Cree Latin alphabet, are listed in the following table (with IPA phonemic notation within slashes). Note that the Cree syllabics symbols chosen for this table all represent syllable codas, as in ᐁᐤ ēw, ᐁᑊ ēp, ᐁᐟ ēt, etc. The consonants are represented differently when they comprise or are a component of a syllable onset, as in ᐍ wē, ᐯ pē, ᐻ pwē, ᑌ tē, etc. The exception is ᐦ h, which always has the same representation, as in ᐁᐦ ēh or ᐦᐁ hē.

	Bilabial	Alveolar	Palatal	Velar	Glottal
Nasal	ᒼ m /m/	ᐣ n /n/			
Stop	ᑊ p /p/	ᐟ t /t/		ᐠ k /k/	(/ʔ/)
Affricate		ᐨ c /t͡s/			
Fricative		ᐢ s /s/			ᐦ h /h/
Approximant	ᐤ w /w/		ᐩ (ᐝ)y/i/ý [j]		

The status of the glottal stop, /ʔ/, as a phoneme in Plains Cree is uncertain. It was recorded in the word ēhaʔ 'yes' (transcribed ähaʔ) by Leonard Bloomfield, who stated that the sound occurred only in this word. In a collaborative online dictionary, Cree speakers have contributed several variants of this word, including ᐁᐦᐊ ēha (written eha and êha), ᐁᐦᐁ ēhē (written êhê), and ᐄᐦᐃ īhi (written îhi). None of these forms includes a final glottal stop. However, there is no way of writing a glottal stop in the standard Latin alphabet or in Cree syllabics. Wolfart's grammar contains a text sample which includes this word without a glottal stop, and in his synopsis of Plains Cree sounds no mention of this sound is made. The same word also occurs in Michif, a language derived in part from Plains Cree. There it appears with a final consonant (and nasalized vowels), as aenhenk 'yes'.

There is a degree of variation in the sounds ᐨ c /t͡s/ and ᐢ s /s/. On the Sweetgrass Reserve in Saskatchewan in 1925, ᐨ c /t͡s/ was either alveolar [t͡s] or palatoalveolar [t͡ʃ], but ᐢ s /s/ was normally alveolar [s], and only abnormally palatoalveolar [ʃ]. In contrast to this, Michif words of Plains Cree origin at Turtle Mountain, North Dakota, invariably have palatoalveolar pronunciation for both of these sounds.

Voicing of the stops and the affricate is not contrastive in Plain Cree, which is to say that the phonemes ᑊ p /p/, ᐟ t /t/, ᐠ k /k/, ᐨ c /t͡s/ have voiceless allophones [p], [t], [k], [t͡s, t͡ʃ] and voiced allophones [b], [d], [ɡ], [d͡z, d͡ʒ]. According to Wolfart and Carroll, the distribution of voiceless and voiced allophones is complementary: voiceless allophones occur in unvoiced phonological contexts; voiced allophones occur in voiced contexts. The context limit is word boundary, not phrase boundary. So voiceless variants occur at the beginning of a word, at the end of a word, and after ᐦ h /h/ or ᐢ s /s/. The voiced variants occur in all other situations. However, other distributions of voiceless versus voiced sounds are possible. Bloomfield reported the same voicing pattern as a possibility for the phoneme ᐠ k /k/, but did not mentioned it for ᑊ p /p/, ᐟ t /t/, or ᐨ c /t͡s/. The Plains Cree component of Michif shows a different pattern with respect to voicing. Plains Cree ᑊ p /p/, ᐟ t /t/, ᐠ k /k/, ᐨ c /t͡s/, and also ᐢ s /s/ normally correspond to the Michif sounds p /p/, t /t/, k /k/, ch /t͡ʃ/, and sh /ʃ/, which in Michif do not have voiced allophones. Michif has voiced sounds b /b/, d /d/, g /ɡ/, j /d͡ʒ/, and zh /ʒ/ which are distinct phonemes, and in some cases the Plains Cree sounds correspond to these. These cases all involve syncope of vowel i /i/ that results in a cluster of nasal consonant plus stop, affricate or sibilant. At the beginning of a word, the nasal consonant is subsequently lost. Unlike the stops and the affricate, sh /ʃ/ becomes voiced only at the beginning of a word.

Voicing variation in Plains Cree and Michif – examples
	Plains Cree proper	Plains Cree words in Michif
"in the mean time"	ᒣᒁᐨ mēkwāc [meːɡwɑːt͡s, meːkwɑːt͡s]	maykwawt, maenkwawt [mẽːkwɑːt]
"run!"	ᐱᒥᐸᐦᑖ pimipahtā [pɪmɪbahtɑː, pɪmɪpahtɑː]	pimbahtaw, pimbastaw [pɪmbahtɑː, pɪmbastɑː]
"how?"	ᑖᓂᓯ tānisi [tɑːnsɪ, tɑːnʃɪ, tɑːnɪsɪ]	tawnshi [tɑ̃ːʃɪ]
"he/she is loved"	ᓵᑭᐦᐋᐤ sākihāw [sɑːɡɪhɑːw, sɑːkɪhɑːw]	shawkihow [ʃɑːkɪhɑːw]
"I love him/her"	ᓂᓵᑭᐦᐋᐤ nisākihāw [nɪsɑːɡɪhɑːw, nɪsɑːkɪhɑːw]	zhawkihow [ʒɑːkɪhɑːw]

Plains Cree has pre-aspirated stops and a pre-aspirated affricate which are actually clusters of /h/ plus a following stop or affricate; these are not separate phonemes. Pre-aspiration can uniquely distinguish words. For example, compare the simple ᐠ k and cluster ᕽ hk in ᐑᒋᐦᐃᐠ wīcihik 'help me!' and ᐑᒋᐦᐃᕽ wīcihihk 'help him!'.

=== Vowels ===
Plains Cree is often described as having seven contrastive vowels, three short and four long. However, northern Plains Cree has only three long vowels.

These vowels in the standard writing systems are listed in the following table (with IPA phonemic notation within slashes). Note that the Cree syllabics symbols chosen for this table all represent syllable nuclei which have no syllable onset. The vowels are represented differently with non-null onset, as for example with n-onset in ᓀ nē, ᓂ ni, ᓃ nī, etc.

	Short		Long	
	Front	Back	Front	Back
High (close)	ᐃ i /i/	ᐅ o /u/	ᐄ ī /iː/	ᐆ ō /oː/
Close-mid			ᐁ ē /eː/	ᐆ ō /oː/
Open-mid	ᐊ a /a/			
Low (open)	ᐊ a /a/		ᐋ ā /aː/	

Within these phonemes there is a degree of allophonic variation. The short close vowels ᐃ i /i/ and ᐅ o /u/ are typically near close [ɪ] and [ʊ], but range to close [i] and [u]. The short open vowel ᐊ a /a/ is typically open, ranging from front [a] to back [ɑ], but its range extends to front open-mid [ɛ] and back open-mid [ʌ]. The long front close vowel ᐄ ī /iː/ is [iː]; ᐁ ē /eː/ is close-mid [eː]; ᐆ ō /oː/ is typically close-mid [oː] but its range includes close [uː]; and ᐋ ā /aː/ ranges from front open [aː] to back open [ɑː].

The description of ᐁ ē /eː/ must be further qualified to account for geographic variation. Although this sound is [eː] in southern Plains Cree, it becomes closer farther north, becoming [iː] and merging with /iː/ in northern Plains Cree, as it has done also in neighbouring Woods Cree.

Contrast in vowel length can be seen in such pairs as:

ᓴᑲᐦᐃᑲᐣ {vs} ᓵᑲᐦᐃᑲᐣ
sakahikan {} sākahikan
nail {} lake

ᓂᐱᐩ {vs} ᓃᐱᐩ
nipiy {} nīpiy
water {} leaf

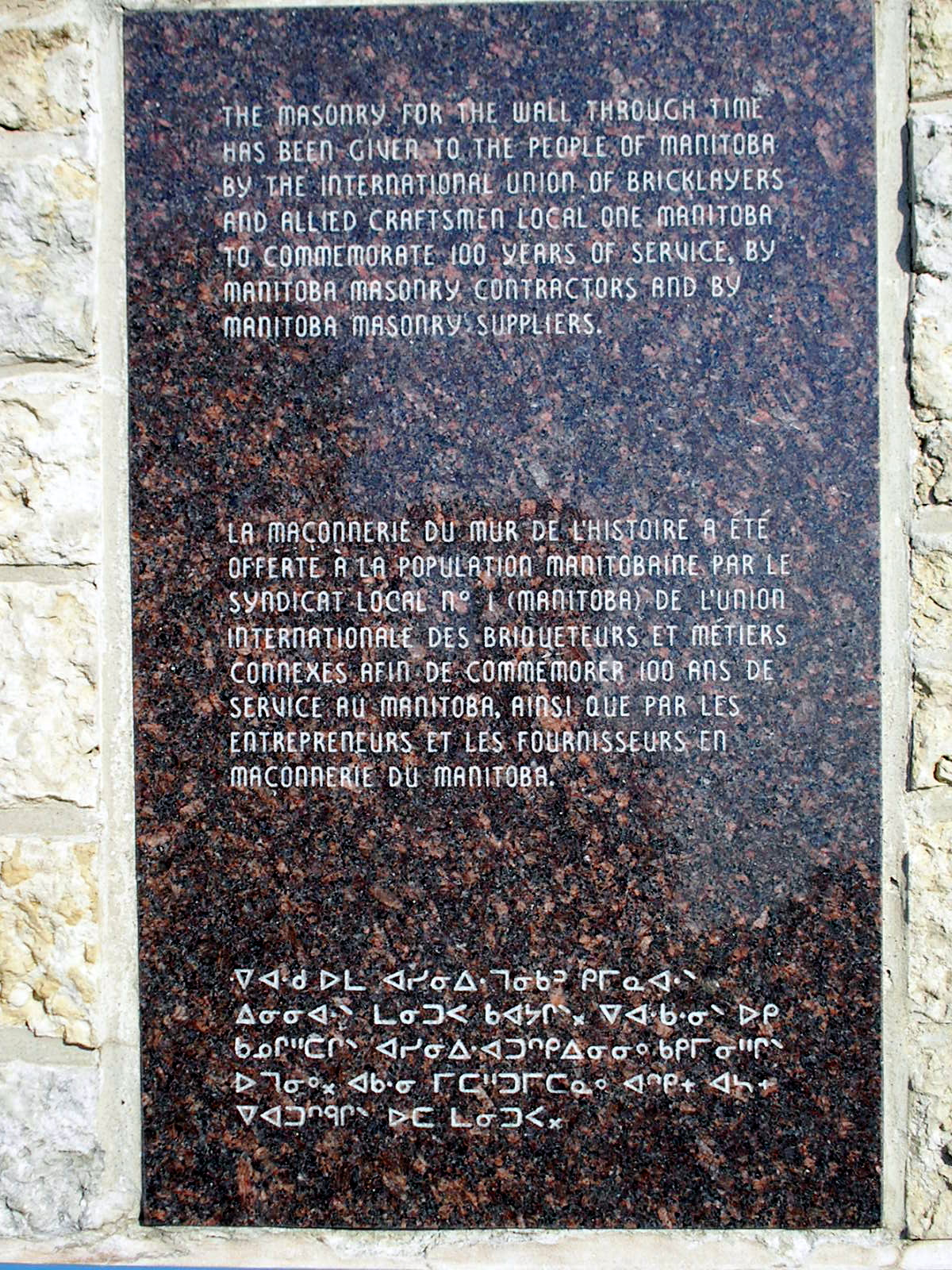
The Forks park in Winnipeg, Manitoba, Canada has a plaque written in English, French, and Plains Cree.

=== Phonological processes ===
==== Consonant sequences ====
The vowel /i/ is inserted when morphemes with non-syllabic endings are followed by morpheme-initial consonants, such as when the transitive animate conjunct ending -at is followed by the third person plural marker -k. The result is not atk but rather acik. Note the palatalization of the /t-i/ sequence. This insertion does not occur before semivowels such as /w/ or in certain specific combinations. Because Plains Cree does not accept the phonological sequence /ww/, however, one /w/ is dropped. When the morpheme /ahkw/, a marker for the inclusive plural in the conjunct order, is followed by /waːw/, the third person plural marker, the word is realized as /ahkwaːw/.

==== Vowel sequences ====
The glide /j/ is inserted between two long vowels, which is why the combination of kīsikā "be day" and āpan "be dawn" forms kīsikāyāpan "it is day-break". Also, the combination of a long vowel and a short vowel deletes the short vowel. Therefore, nīpā "in the dark" and ohtē "walk" form nīpāhtēw "he walks in the dark". This deletion is true whether the short vowel occurs before or after the long vowel. When two short vowels occur in sequence, however, it is the second that deletes. For instance, the stem ositiyi "his foot/feet" combines with the locative suffix /ehk/ to produce ositiyihk "on his foot/feet". Normal patterns of vowel combination and deletion, however, are set aside during prefixation, a process in which a [t] is inserted between vowels when the personal prefixes ki-, ni-, o-, and mi- precede a stem-initial vowel. As a result, when the personal prefix for "I" ni- is affixed to the stem for "sit" apin, the word is realized as nitapin instead of nipin. In isolated cases, /h/ or /w/ is sometimes inserted instead of [t], such as the word nihayān "I have it".

==== Palatalization ====
Palatalization of the sounds /θ/ and /t/ to /s/ and /t͡s/ respectively occurs before the vowels /i/ and /iː/ as well as the consonant /j/. For example, the stem /naːθ/ "fetch" becomes kināsin "you fetch me" before the ending /in/ and kinātitin "I fetch you" where it is not palatalized before the ending /etin/. This pattern includes several important exceptions, including that of the stem wāt- "hole". Before the inanimate proximate singular suffix /i/, one would expect the /t/ to become either /s/ or /t͡s/ but it does not. Palatalization is also found in diminutives, where all instances of /t/ in a word are replaced by /c/ before the diminutive suffixes /es/, /esis/, etc. Thus, nitēm "my horse" would become nicēmisis "my little horse" and atimw- /aθemw/ "dog" would realize as acimosis "little dog". Palatalization to indicate diminution extends even to internal changes within the stem. This is why the statement yōtin "it is windy" can change to yōcin to say that "it is a little windy".

==== Apocopation ====
Word-final short vowels tend to be subject to apocope except for when the stem is syllabic. That is, the word /sīsīp-a/ would become sīsīp "duck" but /nisk-a/ remains niska "goose" because the stem is composed of only a single syllable. Similarly, post-consonantal word-final /w/ is lost. In the case of the Plains Cree word for "dog" /atimwa/, the /w/ is only lost after the short vowel /a/ is dropped when the plural suffix -k is added. Thus, the word is realized atim while its plural form is atimwak.

==== Surface variations ====
In normal, everyday spoken Plains Cree, several phonological contractions are observed. For instance, final vowels can merge with the initial vowel of the following word. This is how the phrase nāpēw mīna atim is reduced to nāpēw mīn ātim "a man and a dog". In this case, the contraction involved the same vowel; the first vowel is taken and included in the second word in its long form. When the contraction involves different vowels, the first vowel is deleted and the second is lengthened: nāpēw mīna iskwēw "a man and a woman" is reduced to nāpēw mīn īskwēw. Contraction does not always occur, and the word boundary may also be distinguished by the insertion of the /h/ sound: mīna iskwēw and mīna(h) iskwēw respectively. Within words, short vowels may also disappear when they are unstressed, especially between [s] and [t] or [n] and [s]. In normal speech, for example, the greeting tānisi "hello" is reduced to tānsi.

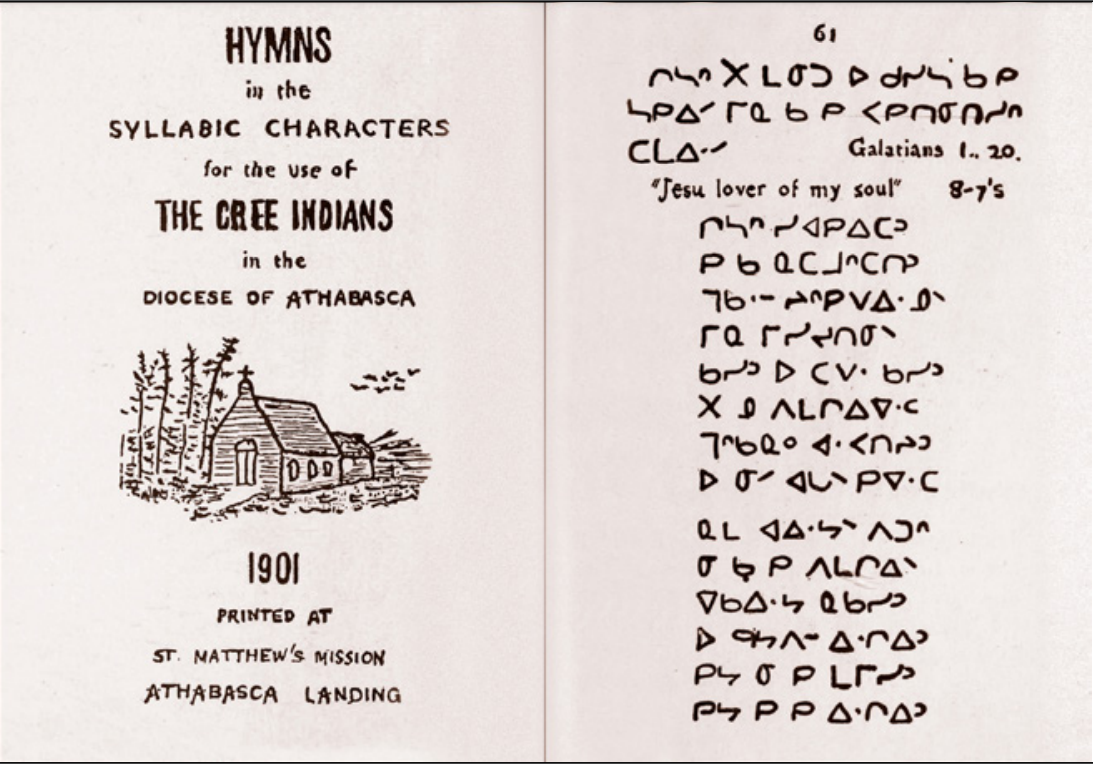
A 1901 Anglican publication by the Diocese of Athabasca, transcribing English hymns with Cree syllables so Cree speakers could phonetically recite hymns

=== Syllable structure and stress ===
The stress pattern of Plains Cree is dependent on the number of syllables rather than on vowel length. For instance, in disyllabic words, it is the last syllable that receives primary stress, as in the word /is'kwe:w/ iskwēw "woman" or /mih'ti/ mihti "piece of firewood". Words of three syllables or more exhibit primary stress on the third syllable from the end. In this case, secondary stress falls on alternate syllables from the antepenult. One may observe, for instance, that the word pasakwāpisimowin "Shut-Eye Dance" is pronounced /'pasa'kwa:pi'simowin/. This rule holds even in cases where the penultimate syllable is long.

==== Phonotactics ====
The syllable itself consists of an optional onset, a peak obligatory vowel and an optional coda. The onset can be non-syllabic or a consonant, sometimes followed by a w. Although any vowel can occur in any position in the word, the long vowels /iː/, /eː/, and /oː/ are found only rarely in initial and final positions. Plains Cree does not permit vowel clusters; clusters of identical non-syllabics; or fricatives followed by a fricative, nasal, or y. The coda, when it occurs, is either [s] or [h] but many Plains Cree words end in a vowel.

The following table describes the phonotactics of Plains Cree by the distribution of consonants and semivowels with relation to the obligatory vowel. Parentheses indicate optional components.

Word-initial (#_V)	Word-medial (V_V)	Word-final (V_#)
p(w)	(h,s)p(w)	(h,s)p
t(w)	(h,s)t(w)	(h,s)t
c(w)	(h,s)c(w)	(h,s)c
k(w)	(h,s)k(w)	(h,s)k
	h(w)	h
s	s(w)	s
m(w)	m(w)	m
n	n(w)	n
w	w	w
y	y(w), hy	y

== Morphology ==
Plains Cree is classified as a polysynthetic fusional language as a result of the complexity of its affix combinations. Apart from four personal prefixes, Plains Cree utilizes suffixes exclusively.

=== Nouns ===
Because almost all grammatical information is stored within the verb, nouns in Plains Cree are relatively simple. Nouns can be marked with possessive prefixes, which are paired with suffixes for plural possessive pronouns like that for "our (excl.)" ni(t)-...-inān. Nominal morphology, like the language in general, is nevertheless dominated by suffixes. This includes the diminutive suffix, plural number suffixes -ak and -a, and the locative suffix -ihk. These forms each have predictable allomorphs. Additional suffixes include those to mark obviation.

Personal Prefixes (excl. third persons)
		Singular	Plural
1st Person	exclusive	/ni-/	/ni(t)-...-ina:n/
1st Person	inclusive	/ni-/	/ki(t)-...-inaw/
2nd Person		/ki(t)-/	/ki(t)-...-iwa:w/
3rd Person	proximate	/o(t)-/	/o(t)-...-iwa:w/
3rd Person	obviative	/o(t)-...iyiw/	/o(t)-...-iwa:w/

=== Verbs ===
==== Position classes ====
Bakker (2006) provides several position class templates for the morphemes in the verbs of Plains Cree, the following of which is the most derived.

- Preverbs
  - A – Person [or conjunct]
  - B – Tense
  - C – Mood
  - D – Aspect 1
  - E – Aspect 2
  - F – Aspect 3
  - G – Aktionsart (Lexical Aspect)
- Stem
- Suffixes
  - I – Possessed object (Obviation)
  - II – Direction/Theme
  - III – Valency
  - IV – Voice
  - V – Possessed subject (Obviation)
  - VI – Person
  - VII – Plural
  - VIII – Conditional

Bakker (2006) observes that this model does contain contradictions relating to the ordering of preverbs and that this is likely due to the multiple functions of some preverbs. That is, identical forms with distinct meanings can occur at different positions in the verb complex.

Wolfart (1973b) identifies two preverb position classes, position 1 and 2. The preverbs of position 1 are few and mutually exclusive while those of position 2 make up an open class of particles, of which several may occur in succession. The preverbs of position 1 include subordinating particles like /e:/ or /ka:/ and the preverbs /ka/ and /kita/, which indicate subsequence or futurity. Position 2 preverbs are arranged semantically along a scale from abstract to concrete. Abstract preverbs include /a:ta/ "although, in vain", in ē-āta-kitōtāt "although he spoke to him", and /wi:/ "will, intend to", as in wī-mēscihāwak "they will all be killed". An example of a concrete preverb can be found in /ka:mwa:ci/ "quietly", in kī-kāmwāci-pimātisiwak , or /ne:wo/ "four" in ē-kī-nēwo-tipiskāyik "when the fourth night passed". Bakker (2006) classes tense as a position 1 preverb but the following mood as both a position 1 and position 2 preverb. Aspect 1 and the Aktionsart are also classified as position 2 preverbs. The difference between Aspect 2 and 3 seems to be that of length, with 2 being durative and 3 being iterative.

==== Reduplication ====
Two types of reduplication occur to verbs and particle roots to denote continuity, repetition or intensity. The first type changes the stem during the process and is not predictable, common, or productive. For example, the root pim- "along" becomes papām- "about". The productive type of reduplication places the reduplicated syllable in front of the root. The reduplicated syllable is formed from the first consonant of the word and an /aː/. The final form looks like /kaːkiːpa/ "over and over". In words beginning with a vowel, the reduplication is marked by /ay-/, as evidenced by the word /ayaːtotam/ "he tells it over and over".

== Syntax ==
=== Word order ===
The basic transitive sentence is of the form SVO, such as awāsisak nipahēwak sīsīpa "the children killed some ducks", but the other forms (SOV, VSO, VOS, OVS, and OSV) are also possible. Subject and object noun phrases both may be omitted. Thus "the children killed some ducks" may also be expressed nipahēwak sīsīpa "they killed some ducks", awāsisak nipahēwak "the children killed them" or nipahēwak "they killed them".

It is uncommon in conversation for the subject and object of a verb to be realized by full noun phrases. Most often, the highly marked parallel noun phrases are used to indicate emphasis. In narration, sentences with full parallel noun phrases often mark the beginning or end of discourse, indicate peripeteia in narrative, or introduce new information. Sentences of the OSV form with two full nouns occur extremely infrequently.

=== Direction and obviation ===
Direction, or the semantic designation of the actor-goal relationship, is morphologically expressed through theme signs that also show agreement between the verb and its nominal complements. In Plains Cree, direction is dependent on person hierarchy, or the order of person-marking morphemes in the verb. The person hierarchy in Plains Cree is: 2 > 1 > 3 > 3'. Note that 3' refers to the obviative third person. Derivational suffixes mark whether the semantic roles of persons follow this person hierarchy or invert it, called direct or inverse form respectively. The following examples place the second person marker first linearly but the direct and inverse suffixes change the semantic roles. The direct marker /-i-/ in the sentence ki-wāpam-i-n indicates that it should be read "you see me". The reading is reversed to "I see you" in the sentence ki-wāpam-iti-n because of the inverse marker /-iti-/. Compare the difference in meaning between the two directions in the following tables.

Direct Set
(2-1)	(1-3)	(3-(3'))	(3'-(3'))
kitasamin you feed me	nitasamāw I feed him	asamēw He feeds him	asamēyiwa He feeds him

Inverse Set
(1-2)	(3-1)	((3')-3)	((3')-3')
kitasamitin I feed you	nitasamik He feeds me	asamik He feeds him	asamikoyiwa He feeds him

Note that the situation is made more complicated when both referents are third persons because Plains Cree implements obviation. For example, we have the sentence sēkihēw nāpēw atimwa. The verb sēkihēw "scare" contains the direct-set marker /-e:w-/, indicating that the proximate third person is acting on the obviative. The noun nāpēw "man" is marked as proximate through the absence of a suffix while the noun atimwa "dog" contains the obviative suffix /-wa/. Thus the sentence reads "the man scares the dog", with special emphasis on the proximate "man". This is contrasted by the sentence sēkihik nāpēw atimwa, where the markers for obviation are the same but the direction marker is now the inverse-set /-ik/ representing action of the obviative third person on the proximate third. Therefore, the sentence becomes "the dog scares the man" and the emphasis still lies with the proximate "man". The sentence may require that the dog atim be the proximate noun, in which case the sentence would be either sēkihēw nāpēwa atim "the dog (3) scares(3-(3')) the man (3')" or sēkihik nāpēwa atim "the man (3') scares ((3')-3) the dog (3)". Direction and obviation are not versions of the passive, which is formed separately in Plains Cree.

=== Locative suffix ===
Because Plains Cree does not have a true case marking system, it has to instead rely on direction, obviation, and the locative suffix. This suffix, /ehk/ or its variant /ena:hk/, has the basic meanings of at, in, on, etc. The simple locative suffix /ehk/ can be used with stems or possessed themes, such as the stem skāt "leg". The personal pronoun /ni-/ can be added to the stem to make niskāt "my leg" and the addition of the plural suffix /-a/ makes niskāta "my legs". On top of these changes, the simple locative suffix is affixed to produce niskātihk "on my leg(s)". The distributive locative suffix /ena:hk/ is used with nouns that reference humans or animals. In this way, ayīsiyiniw- "human being" becomes ayīsiyinināk "among humans" or "in this world". Similarly, the noun sāsīw "Sarci Indian" changes to "at Sarci Reserve" sāsīnāhk.

=== Noun incorporation ===
According to Denny (1978), Wolfart identifies intransitive verbs with transitive stems as clear examples of noun incorporation because they can be reworded with the medial replaced by independent nouns. The example nōcihiskwēwēw "he chases women" is given to illustrate the inclusion of the noun woman iskwēw within the verb complex, which can be paraphrased as iskwēwa nōcihēw "he pursues a woman". Denny (1978) contends that these sentences have an importance semantic difference in that the meaning of the incorporative form is narrower and denotes habitual action. He argues that the medial, or noun classifier, has taken on an adverbial meaning in this context. This is illustrated in the Plains Cree sentence wanihastimwēw "he loses his horse" or, literally, "he horse-loses".

== Vocabulary ==
Plains Cree is one of several dialects of Cree-Montagnais. The following tables show words in Plains Cree and corresponding words in a selection of other Cree dialects. A number of similarities and some differences can be seen. In some cases the differences are only in orthography. Plains Cree has some regular sound correspondences with other Cree-Montagnais dialects, and in some cases the differences between Plains Cree and other dialects exemplify these regular correspondences. Note that in terms of linguistic classification, the East Cree dialect which appears in these tables is a dialect of Montagnais.

In the following table, each noun is given in its singular form. All forms are either specifically proximate, or can be either proximate or obviate. If a noun is possessed, the possessor is first person singular.

Some Plains Cree nouns and their counterparts in other Cree-Montagnais dialects
	Plains Cree	Woods Cree	Swampy Cree, eastern	East Cree, southern inland
"axe"	ᒌᑲᐦᐃᑲᐣ cīkahikan	ᒉᑲᐦᐃᑲᐣ cīkahikan	ᒌᑲᐦᐃᑲᐣ cīkahikan	ᐅᓯᑖᔅᒄ usitaaskw
"bear"	ᒪᐢᑿ maskwa	ᒪᐢᑿ maskwa	ᒪᐢᑾ (western ᒪᐢᑿ) maskwa	ᒪᔅᒄ maskw (but also ᒋᔐᔮᒄ chisheyaakw, ᑳᑰᔥ kaakuush)
"book"	ᒪᓯᓇᐦᐃᑲᐣ masinahikan	ᒪᓯᓇᐦᐃᑲᐣ masinahikan	ᒪᓯᓇᐦᐃᑲᐣ masinahikan	ᒪᓯᓇᐦᐄᑲᓂᔥ masinahiikan
"car"	ᓭᐦᑫᐤ sēhkēw	ᐅᑖᐹᓈᐢᐠ otāpānāsk		ᐅᑖᐹᓐ utaapaan
"clock"	ᐲᓯᒧᐦᑳᐣ pīsimohkān	ᐯᓯᒧᐦᑳᐣ pīsimohkān		ᐲᓯᒧᐦᑳᓐ piisimuhkaan
"dog"	ᐊᑎᒼ atim	ᐊᑎᒼ atim	ᐊᑎᒼ atim	ᐊᑎᒽ atimw
"fire"	ᐃᐢᑯᑌᐤ iskotēw	ᐃᐢᑯᑌᐤ iskotīw	ᐃᐡᑯᑌᐤ iškotew	ᐃᔥᑯᑌᐤ ishkuteu
"fish"	ᑭᓄᓭᐤ kinosēw	ᑭᓄᓭᐤ kinosīw		ᓇᒣᔅ names
"gun"	ᐹᐢᑭᓯᑲᐣ pāskisikan	ᐹᐢᑭᓯᑲᐣ pāskisikan	ᐹᐢᑭᓯᑲᐣ pāskisikan	ᐹᔅᒋᓯᑲᓐ paaschisikan
"horse"	ᒥᐢᑕᑎᒼ mistatim	ᒥᐢᑕᑎᒼ mistatim, ᒥᓴᑎᒼ misatim	(western ᒥᓴᑎᒼ misatim)	ᑳᐸᓚᑯᔥᑴᐤ kaapalakushkweu, ᐊᐦᐋᔅ ahâs
"hospital"	ᐋᐦᑯᓰᐏᑲᒥᐠ āhkosīwikamik	ᐋᐦᑯᓭᐏᑲᒥᐠ āhkosīwikamik	ᐋᐦᑯᓰᐎᑲᒥᐠ āhkosīwikamik	ᐋᐦᑯᓰᐅᑲᒥᒄ aahkusiiukamikw
"knife"	ᒨᐦᑯᒫᐣ mōhkomān	ᒧᐦᑯᒫᐣ mohkomān	ᒨᐦᑯᒫᐣ mōhkomān	ᒨᐦᑯᒫᓐ muuhkomaan
"man (male adult)"	ᓈᐯᐤ nāpēw	ᓈᐯᐤ nāpīw	ᓈᐯᐤ nāpew	ᓈᐯᐤ naapeu
"money"	ᓲᓂᔮᐤ sōniyāw		ᔔᓂᔮᐤ šōniyāw	ᔔᓕᔮᐤ shuuliyaau
"moose"	ᒨᔁ mōswa	ᒨᔁ mōswa	ᒨᐢ mōs (western ᒨᔁ mōswa)	ᒨᔅ muus
"my father"	ᓅᐦᑖᐏᕀ (ᓅᐦᑖᐃ᛬) nōhtāwiy, ᓂᐹᐹ nipāpā	ᓂᐹᐹ nipāpā, ᓄᐦᑖᐏᕀ nōhtāwiy	ᓅᐦᑖᐎᕀ (western ᓅᐦᑖᐏᕀ) nōhtāwiy	ᓅᐦᑖᐐ nuuhtaawii
"my mother"	ᓂᑳᐏᕀ (ᓂᑳᐃ᛬) nikāwiy, ᓂᐹᐹ nimāmā	ᓂᒫᒫ nimāmā, ᓂᑳᐏᕀ nikāwiy	(western ᓂᑳᐏᕀ nikāwiy)	ᓂᑳᐐ nikaawii
"my older brother"	ᓂᐢᑌᐢ nistēs	ᓂᐢᑌᐢ nistīs	ᓂᐢᑌᐢ nistes (western nistēs)	ᓂᔅᑌᔅ nistes
"my older sister"	ᓂᒥᐢ nimis	ᓂᒥᐢ nimis	ᓂᒥᐢ nimis (also western)	ᓂᒥᔅ nimis
"my younger brother/sister"	ᓂᓰᒥᐢ nisīmis	ᓂᓭᒥᐢ nisīmis	(western ᓂᓰᒥᐢ nisīmis)	ᓂᔒᒻ nishiim
"shoe"	ᒪᐢᑭᓯᐣ maskisin	ᒪᐢᑭᓯᐣ maskisin	ᒪᐢᑭᓯᐣ maskisin	ᒪᔅᒋᓯᓐ maschisin
"sugar"	ᓲᑳᐤ sōkāw, ᓰᐏᓂᑲᐣ sīwinikan	ᓲᑳᐤ sōkāw		ᔔᑳᐤ shuukaau
"town"	ᐆᑌᓈᐤ ōtēnāw		ᐃᐦᑖᐎᐣ ihtāwin	ᐃᐦᑖᐎᓐ ihtaawin, ᐅᑌᓇᐤ utenau
"tree"	ᒥᐢᑎᐠ mistik	ᒥᐢᑎᐠ mistik	ᒥᐢᑎᐠ mistik	ᒥᔥᑎᒄ mishtikw
"woman"	ᐃᐢᑵᐤ iskwēw	ᐃᐢᑵᐤ iskwīw	ᐃᐢᑶᐤ iskwew	ᐃᔅᑶᐤ iskweu

In the following table, each verb is given with a third person singular subject, and if a verb is transitive, with a third person object or objects (primary and secondary). The pronouns used in the English translations are imprecise due to an imprecise correspondence of Cree categories with English categories. "He/she" in a subject and "him/her" in an object refer to Cree animate gender even when "it" might be a better English translation. So for example the verb "he/she kills him/her/them", might describe a bear killing a moose, in which case "it kills it" would be a better English translation. In the table, "it" in a subject or an object refers to Cree inanimate gender. The presence of "they" or "them" indicates that the subject or object could be either singular or plural. And finally, the designation "him/her/it/them" indicates that the object could be either animate or inanimate and either singular or plural.

Some Plains Cree verbs and their counterparts in other Cree-Montagnais dialects
	Plains Cree	Woods Cree	Swampy Cree, eastern	East Cree, southern inland
"he/she arrives"	ᑕᑯᓯᐣ takosin		ᑕᑯᔑᐣ takošin	ᑕᑯᔑᓐ takushin
"he/she can see enough of it/them"	ᑌᐹᐸᐦᑕᒼ tēpāpahtam		ᑌᐹᐸᐦᑕᒼ tepāpahtam	ᑌᐹᐸᐦᑕᒻ tepaapahtam
"he/she coughs"	ᐅᐢᑐᐢᑐᑕᒼ ostostotam		ᐅᐢᑐᐢᑐᑕᒼ ostostotam	ᐅᔥᑐᑕᒻ ushtutam
"he/she dies, ceases to live"	ᓂᐱᐤ nipiw, ᐴᓂᐱᒫᑎᓯᐤ pōnipimātisiw		ᓂᐱᐤ nipiw	ᐴᓂᐱᒫᑎᓰᐤ puunipimaatisiiu
"he/she embarks"	ᐴᓯᐤ pōsiw		ᐴᓯᐤ pōsiw	ᐴᓲ puusuu
"he/she gives him/her/it/them to him/her/them"	ᒥᔦᐤ miyēw	ᒣᖧᐤ mīthīw	ᒦᓀᐤ mīnew	ᒦᔦᐤ miiyeu
"he/she is sleeping"	ᓂᐹᐤ nipāw		ᓂᐹᐤ nipāw	ᓂᐹᐤ nipaau
"he/she kills him/her/them"	ᓂᐸᐦᐁᐤ nipahēw		ᓂᐸᐦᐁᐤ nipahew	ᓂᐸᐦᐁᐤ nipaheu
"he/she knows him/her/them"	ᑭᐢᑫᔨᒣᐤ kiskēyimēw		ᑭᐢᑫᓂᒣᐤ kiskenimew	ᒋᔅᒉᔨᒣᐤ chischeyimeu
"he/she laughs"	ᐹᐦᐱᐤ pāhpiw	ᐹᐦᐱᐤ pāhpiw	ᐹᐦᐱᐤ pāhpiw	ᐹᐦᐴ paahpuu
"he/she lives"	ᐱᒫᑎᓯᐤ pimātisiw		ᐱᒫᑎᓯᐤ pimātisiw	ᐱᒫᑎᓰᐤ pimaatisiiu
"he/she plays"	ᒣᑕᐍᐤ mētawēw	ᒣᑕᐍᐤ mītawīw		ᒣᑕᐌᐤ metaweu
"he/she sees him/her/them"	ᐚᐸᒣᐤ wāpamēw	ᐚᐸᒣᐤ wāpamīw	ᐙᐸᒣᐤ wāpamew	ᐙᐸᒣᐤ waapameu
"he/she sees it/them"	ᐚᐸᐦᑕᒼ wāpahtam	ᐚᐸᐦᑕᒼ wāpahtam	ᐙᐸᐦᑕᒼ wāpahtam	ᐙᐸᐦᑕᒼ waapahtam
"he/she shoots him/her/them"	ᐹᐢᑭᓷᐤ pāskiswēw	ᐹᐢᑭᓷᐤ pāskiswīw		ᐹᔅᒋᓷᐤ paaschisweu
"he/she shoots it/them"	ᐹᐢᑭᓴᒼ pāskisam		ᐹᐢᑭᓴᒼ pāskisam	ᐹᔅᒋᓴᒻ paaschisam
"he/she shoots"	ᐹᐢᑭᓯᑫᐤ pāskisikew		ᐹᐢᑭᓯᑫᐤ pāskisikew	ᐹᔅᒋᓯᒉᐤ paaschisicheu
"he/she walks"	ᐱᒧᐦᑌᐤ pimohtēw	ᐱᒧᐦᑌᐤ pimohtīw	ᐱᒧᐦᑌᐤ pimohtew	ᐱᒧᐦᑌᐤ pimuhteu
"he/she works"	ᐊᑐᐢᑫᐤ atoskēw	ᐊᑐᐢᑫᐤ atoskīw	ᐊᑐᐢᑫᐤ atoskew	ᐊᑐᔅᒉᐤ atuscheu
"it is big"	ᒥᓵᐤ misāw		ᒥᔖᐤ mišāw	ᒥᔖᐤ mishaau
"it is nice"	ᒥᔼᓯᐣ miywāsin		ᒥᓍᔑᐣ minwāšin	ᒥᔻᔔ miywaashuu
"it is raining"	ᑭᒧᐘᐣ kimowan	ᑭᒧᐘᐣ kimowan	ᑭᒧᐗᐣ kimowan	ᒋᒧᐎᓐ chimuwin
"it is snowing"	ᒥᐢᐳᐣ mispon	ᒥᐢᐳᐣ mispon	ᒥᐢᐳᐣ mispon	ᒥᔅᐳᓐ mispun
"it is windy"	ᔫᑎᐣ yōtin	ᖫᑎᐣ thōtin	ᓅᑎᐣ nōtin	ᔫᑎᓐ yuutin
"it tastes good"	ᒥᔪᐢᐸᑿᐣ miyospakwan		ᒥᓄᐢᐸᑾᐣ minospakwan	ᒥᔪᔅᐳᑯᓐ miyuspukun

Some Plains Cree particles and their counterparts in other Cree-Montagnais dialects
	Plains Cree	Woods Cree	Swampy Cree, western	East Cree, southern inland
"in the morning"	ᑫᑭᓭᑊ kēkisēp, ᑮᑭᓭᑊ kīkisēp		(eastern ᑫᑭᔐᑊ kekišep)	ᒉᒋᔐᑉ chechishep
"outside"	ᐘᔭᐑᑎᒥᕽ wayawītimihk	ᐘᖬᐍᑎᒥᕽ wathawītimihk	(eastern ᐗᓇᐐᑎᒥᕽ wanawītimihk)	ᐐᐐᑎᒥᐦᒡ wiiwiitimihch
"one"	ᐯᔭᐠ pēyak	ᐯᔭᐠ pīyak	ᐯᔭᐠ pēyak (eastern peyak)	ᐯᔭᒄ peyakw
"two"	ᓃᓱ nīso	ᓀᓱ nīso	ᓃᓱ nīso (eastern ᓃᔓ nīšo)	ᓃᔓ niishu
"three"	ᓂᐢᑐ nisto	ᓂᐢᑐ nisto	ᓂᐢᑐ nisto	ᓂᔥᑐ nishtu
"four"	ᓀᐓ nēwo	ᓀᔪ nīyo	ᓀᐓ nēwo	ᓀᐅ neu
"five"	ᓂᔮᓇᐣ niyānan	ᓂᔮᓇᐣ niyānan	ᓂᔮᓇᐣ niyānan	ᓂᔮᔨᓐ niyaayin
"six"	ᓂᑯᑤᓯᐠ nikotwāsik	ᓂᑯᑤᓯᐠ nikotwāsik	ᓂᑯᑤᓯᐠ nikotwāsik	ᓂᑯᑣᔥᒡ nikutwaashch
"seven"	ᑌᐸᑯᐦᑊ tēpakohp	ᑌᐸᑯᐦᑊ tīpakohp	ᑌᐸᑯᐦᑊ tēpakohp	ᓃᔣᔥᒡ niishwaashch
"eight"	ᐊᔨᓈᓀᐤ ayinānēw	ᐊᔨᓈᓀᐤ ayinānīw	ᐊᔨᓈᓀᐤ ayinānēw	ᓂᔮᓈᓀᐤ niyaanaaneu
"nine"	ᑫᑲ ᒥᑖᑕᐦᐟ kēka-mitātaht	ᑫᑲ ᒥᑖᑕᐦᐟ kīka-mitātaht	ᑫᑲ ᒥᑖᑕᐦᐟ kēka-mitātaht	ᐯᔭᑯᔥᑌᐤ peyakushteu
"ten"	ᒥᑖᑕᐦᐟ mitātaht	ᒥᑖᑕᐦᐟ mitātaht	ᒥᑖᑕᐦᐟ mitātaht	ᒥᑖᐦᑦ mitaaht

Words sources for these tables are: Plains Cree, the Online Cree Dictionary website; Woods Cree, the Gift of Language and Culture website and the Saskatchewan Indian Languages website, western Swampy Cree, the Saskatchewan Indian Languages website; eastern Swampy Cree, Ontario Ministry of Education (2002), and East Cree, the Eastern James Bay Cree Language website. Note that where a table entry is blank, it is because the word was not found in these listed sources; without additional information this should not be interpreted to imply that the word does not exist for the dialect in question.

== Writing systems ==
Two writing systems are used for Plains Cree: Syllabics and Latin script.

=== Cree Syllabics ===
Plains Cree follows the western Cree usage of Canadian Aboriginal syllabics. The distinguishing features of western Cree syllabics are the position of the w-dot and the use of western finals. The western w-dot is placed after its syllabic, as in ᒷ mwa (eastern ᒶ mwa). The form of a western final is unrelated to the corresponding syllabic with a-nucleus, whereas an eastern final is like superscript version of the corresponding syllabic with a-nucleus; thus the western final ᐟ t bears no resemblance to ᑕ ta (eastern final ᑦ t), and western final ᒼ m is not like ᒪ ma (eastern final ᒻ m).

Some Plains Cree communities use a final for y which is different from the usual western final. This is a superposed dot ᐝ, instead of the usual ᐩ, as in ᓰᐱᐩ (ᓰᐱᐝ) sīpiy "river". When the dot y-final is placed after a syllabic which has a w-dot, the two dots combine to form a colon-like symbol, as in ᓅᐦᑖᐏᐩ (ᓅᐦᑖᐃ᛬) nōhtāwiy "my father".

Writing style in syllabics can differ with respect to pointing. In the Online Cree Dictionary, examples can be found of words with vowel length not distinguished due to lack of pointing.

=== Standard Roman Orthography ===
Plains Cree's Standard Roman Orthography (SRO) uses fourteen letters of the ISO basic Latin alphabet to denote the dialect's ten consonants (p, t, c, k, s, m, n, w, y and h) and seven vowels (a, i, o, ā, ī, ō and ē). Upper case letters are not used.

The stops, p, t, k, and the affricate, c, can be pronounced either voiced or unvoiced, but the symbols used for writing these sounds all correspond to the unvoiced pronunciation, e.g. p not b, t not d, etc. The phoneme /t͡s/ is represented by c, as it is in various other languages.

Long vowels are denoted with either a macron, as in ā, or a circumflex, as in â. Use of either the macron or circumflex is acceptable, but usage should be consistent within a work. The vowel ē /eː/, used in southern Plains Cree, is always long and the grapheme e is never used (in northern Plains Cree the sound has merged with ī, thus ē is not used at all).

The use of unmarked o and marked ō for the phonemes /u/ and /oː/ emphasizes the relationship that can exist between these two vowels. There are situations where o can be lengthened to ō, as for example in ᓂᑲᒧ! nikamo! "sing (now)!" and ᓂᑲᒨᐦᑲᐣ! nikamōhkan! "sing (later)!".

An acute accent is sometimes used on y for the sake of mutual intelligibility with speakers of Woods Cree and Swampy Cree, where ý would be replaced by ð or n respectively. E.g. kīýa ('you') vs. kīða or kīna.

== Bibliography ==
- Dahlstrom, Amy (1991). Plains Cree Morphosyntax. Outstanding dissertations in linguistics. New York: Garland. ISBN 0-8153-0172-3.
- Hirose, Tomio (2003). Origins of predicates evidence from Plains Cree. Outstanding dissertations in linguistics. New York: Routledge. ISBN 0-415-96779-1.
- McIlwraith, Naomi Lynne (2007). Nitohta anohc. Nakatohke. Now listen. Listen hard: A creative study of Nehiyawewin, the Plains Cree language, and the reasons for its preservation (MA thesis). University of Alberta. doi:10.7939/r3-z6vb-cx68.
- Okimāsis, Jean L. (2018). Cree: Language of the Plains / nēhiyawēwin: paskwāwi-pīkiskwēwin. University of Regina Press. hdl:10294/8401. ISBN 978-0-88977-550-3.
- Wolfart, H. Christoph; Ahenakew, Freda (1998). The Student's Dictionary of Literary Plains Cree, Based on Contemporary Texts. Algonquian and Iroquoian Linguistics Memoirs. Vol. 15. Winnipeg: University of Manitoba. ISBN 0-921064-15-2.
- Wolvengrey, Arok (2001). nēhiýawēwin: itwēwina. Regina: Canadian Plains Research Centre. ISBN 0-88977-127-8.
