= Freda Ahenakew =

Canadian author and academic

- Born: February 11, 1932; Ahtahkakoop 104, Saskatchewan
- Died: April 8, 2011 (aged 79)
- Education: University of Saskatchewan; University of Manitoba
- Occupations: Author; Academic
- Spouse: Harold Greyeyes (1951–1979)
- Writing career
- Genre: Children's Literature
- Notable awards: Order of Canada; Saskatchewan Order of Merit

Freda Ahenakew CM SOM (February 11, 1932 – April 8, 2011) was a Canadian author and academic of Cree descent. Ahenakew was considered a leader in Indigenous language preservation and literary heritage preservation in Canada. She was a sister-in-law to the political activist David Ahenakew.

== Biography ==
Freda Ahenakew was born in Ahtahkakoop, Saskatchewan, the second of eight children. Her parents were Edward and Annie (née Bird) Ahenakew. She spent some of her teenage years living at St. Alban's Residential School in Prince Albert, and attended the Prince Albert Collegiate Institute.

Ahenakew married Harold Greyeyes (who attended Qu'Appelle Indian Residential School, then worked with the Saskatchewan Indian Agricultural Program through FSIN) from the Muskeg Lake Cree Nation (which henceforth made her a member of the same), and together they had 12 children. She would later return to follow her educational goals in 1968, where she attended high school with 9 of her children. In 1979, she obtained her Bachelor of Education from the University of Saskatchewan while teaching Cree language. Her marriage to Greyeyes ended the same year. Between 1976 and 1981, she found employment teaching at the Saskatchewan Indian Cultural College, the Lac La Ronge Band, and the Saskatchewan Survival School (now the Joe Duquette High School) in Saskatoon.

In 1984, she received a Master of Arts in Cree linguistics from the University of Manitoba, working closely with Professor H.C. Wolfart. Her Master's thesis, "Cree Language Structures", was later published. From 1983 to 1985, she was an assistant professor in the Native Studies department of University of Saskatchewan. She was the director of the Saskatchewan Indian Languages Institute from 1985 until 1989. After leading the institute, she was a professor in Native studies at the University of Manitoba until her 1996 retirement.

Freda Ahenakew died on April 8, 2011.

=== Work ===
Ahenakew did a lot of different types of work to help revive the Cree language. She had Cree Immersion classes, Cree Immersion summer camps, and also transcribed the stories of elders in her tribe, whom she herself had interviewed. Her scholarly publications included children's books, textbooks and technical dictionaries focused on preserving Cree language and tradition in education.

=== Awards ===
Ahenakew has been the recipient of numerous honorary awards including an honorary degree from the University of Saskatchewan in 1997, and another from the University of Manitoba in 2009. In 1992, she was awarded the Federation of Saskatchewan Indian Nations Citizen of the Year award. She was made a Member of the Order of Canada in 1998 and was awarded the Saskatchewan Order of Merit in 2005. In 2001, she received the National Aboriginal Achievement Award, now known as the Indspire Award.

In 2016, a branch of the Saskatoon Public Library was named for Freda Ahenakew.

== Selected bibliography ==
- Cree Language Structures: A Cree Approach. Winnipeg: University of Manitoba Press (1987)
- "wâskahikaniwiyiniw-âcimowina / Stories of the House People. Winnipeg: University of Manitoba Press" (1987) Coeditor.
- How the Birch Tree Got its Stripes: A Cree Story for Children (1988)
- How the Mouse Got Brown Teeth: A Cree Story for Children (1988)
- kôhkominawak otâcimowiniwâwa / Our Grandmothers' Lives, as Told in Their Own Words. Told by Glecia Bear et al. Edited and translated by F. Ahenakew & H.C. Wolfart. Saskatoon: Fifth House Publishers, 1992. [facsimile reprint, with new preface: Canadian Plains Reprint Series, Canadian Plains Research Centre, University of Regina, 1998]
- kinêhiyâwiwininaw nêhiyawêwin / The Cree Language is Our Identity: The La Ronge Lectures of Sarah Whitecalf. Edited, translated and with a glossary by H.C. Wolfart & F. Ahenakew. Publications of the Algonquian Text Society / Collection de la Société d'édition de textes algonquiens. Winnipeg: University of Manitoba Press, 1993.
- kwayask ê-kî-pê-kiskinowâpahtihicik / Their Example Showed Me the Way: A Cree Woman's Life Shaped by Two Cultures. Told by Emma Minde. Edited, translated and with a glossary by F. Ahenakew & H.C. Wolfart. Edmonton, University of Alberta Press, 1997.
- The Student's Dictionary of Literary Plains Cree, Based on Contemporary Texts. with H.C. Wolfart. Algonquian and Iroquoian Linguistics, Memoir 15, 1998.
- Wisahkecahk Flies to the Moon (1999)
- âh-âyîtaw isi ê-kî-kiskêyihtahkik maskihkiy / They Knew Both Sides of Medicine: Cree Tales of Curing and Cursing Told by Alice Ahenakew. Edited, translated and with a glossary by H.C. Wolfart & Freda Ahenakew. Publications of the Algonquian Text Society / Collection de la Société d'édition de textes algonquiens. Winnipeg: University of Manitoba Press, 2000.
- ana kâ-pimwêwêhahk okakêskihkêmowina / The Counselling Speeches of Jim Kâ-Nîpitêhtêw. Edited, translated and with a glossary by F. Ahenakew & H.C. Wolfart. Publications of the Algonquian Text Society / Collection de la Société d'édition de textes algonquiens. Winnipeg: University of Manitoba Press, 1998. [2007]
