= Naskapi language =

Cree language of eastern Canada

Naskapi
- ᓇᔅᑲᐱ naskapi, ᐃᔪᐤ ᐃᔨᒧᐅᓐ iyuw iyimuun
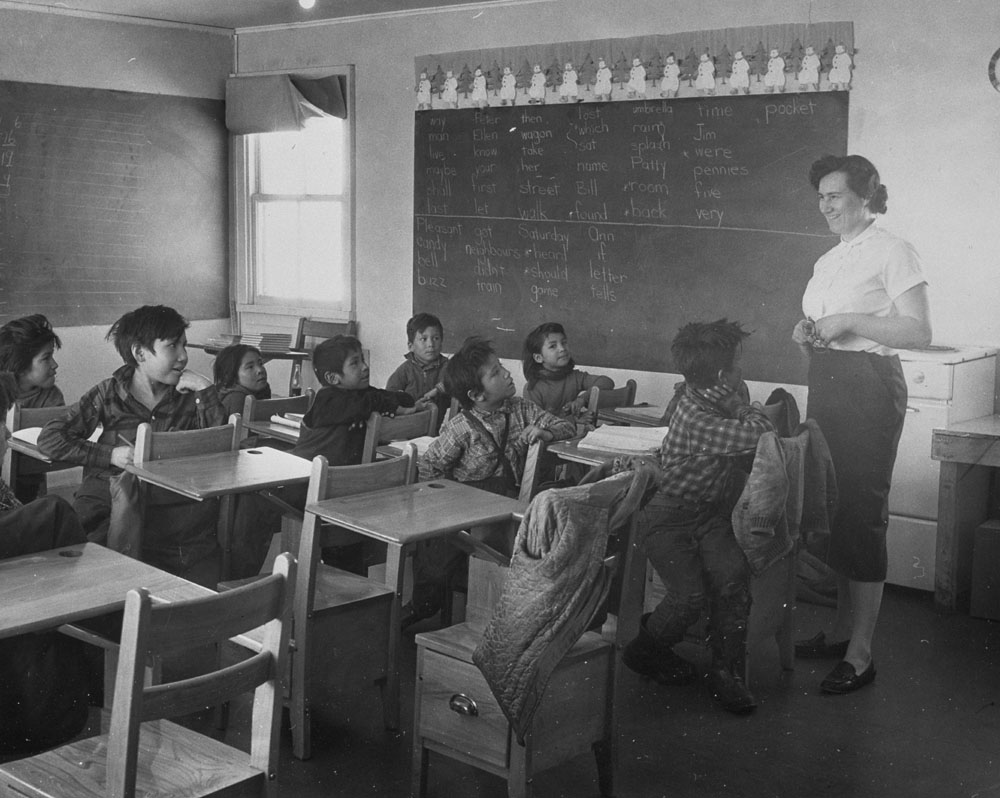
- Naskapi children in a classroom, Quebec, Canada
- Native to: Canada
- Region: St'aschinuw (Quebec, Labrador)
- Ethnicity: Naskapi
- Native speakers: 1,230 (2016 census)
- Language family: Algic: Algonquian; Cree-Montagnais-Naskapi; Naskapi
- Writing system: Eastern Cree syllabics

Language codes
- ISO 639-3: nsk
- Glottolog: nask1242
- Linguasphere: 62-ADA-ba

- People: Naskapi Iyuw ᓇᔅᑲᐱ ᐃᔪᐤ
- Language: Naskapi Iyuw Iyimuun ᓇᔅᑲᐱ ᐃᔪᐤ ᐃᔨᒧᐅᓐ
- Country: St'aschinuw ᒋᑦ ᐊᔅᒋᓄᐤ

Naskapi (also known as ᐃᔪᐤ ᐃᔨᒧᐅᓐ/Iyuw Iyimuun in the Naskapi language) is an Algonquian language spoken by the Naskapi in Quebec and Labrador, Canada. It is written in Eastern Cree syllabics.

The term Naskapi is chiefly used to refer to the language of the people living in the interior of Quebec and Labrador in or around Kawawachikamach, Quebec. Naskapi is a "y-dialect" that has many linguistic features in common with the Northern dialect of East Cree, and which also shares many lexical items with the Innu language.

Although there is a much closer linguistic and cultural relationship between Naskapi and Innu than between Naskapi and other Cree language communities, Naskapi remains unique and distinct from all other language varieties in the Quebec-Labrador peninsula.

== Phonology ==
=== Consonants ===
		Bilabial	Alveolar	Palatal	Velar	Glottal
Nasal		m	n			
Plosive/Affricate		p	t	tʃ	k	
Fricative			s			h
Approximant	median		(ɹ)	j	w	
Approximant	lateral		(l)			

- The stops have voiced [b, d, dʒ, ɡ] and preaspirated [ʰp, ʰt, ʰtʃ, ʰk] allophones.
- /ɹ, l/ are found in loanwords.

=== Vowels ===
- Long vowels: /i/, /a~æ/, /u/
- Short vowels: /ɪ~ə/, /ʌ~ə/, /o~ʊ/

== Orthography ==
There are two writing systems used for Naskapi language. One is Latin, similar to the Innu language (Montagnais), and the other is Cree syllabics, similar to James Bay Cree, as well as other dialects of Cree across Canada.

=== Latin ===
The Naskapi Latin alphabet consists of three vowels, ⟨a⟩, ⟨i⟩, and ⟨u⟩, in short form and in long form. The long form is either written with a circumflex accent, e.g. ⟨â⟩, or by simply writing the vowel twice, e.g. ⟨aa⟩. In addition there are twelve graphemes to represent the consonants, including the digraph ⟨Ch⟩.

Uppercase	A	Â/AA	Ch	H	I	Î/II	K	L	M	N	P	R	S	T	U	Û/UU	W	Y
lowercase	a	â/aa	ch	h	i	î/ii	k	l	m	n	p	r	s	t	u	û/uu	w	y
IPA	/ʌ~ə/	/a~æ/	/tʃ, dʒ/	/h/	/ɪ~ə/	/i/	/k, g/	/l/	/m/	/n/	/p, b/	/ɹ/	/s, ʃ/	/t, d/	/o~ʊ/	/u/	/w/	/j/

- Ch, K, P, and T are also used to write the voiced allophones.
- L and R are only used in loanwords from other languages.

=== Syllabary ===
Naskapi Syllabics (ᓇᔅᑲᐱ ᐃᔪᐤ ᐃᔨᒧᐅᓐ, naskapi iyuw iyimuun) is derived from Canadian Aboriginal syllabics, and while having its unique characteristics, shares many features with other Canadian Cree Syllabic systems. Unlike other Cree Syllabics, long and short vowels are not distinguished. The final forms in Naskapi Syllabics are similar to other varieties of Eastern Cree syllabics.

	_a	_i	_u	_wa	_wi	_w	s_wa	-
-	ᐊ	ᐃ	ᐅ	ᐛ	ᐎ	ᐤ		
p	ᐸ	ᐱ	ᐳ	ᑈ			ᔌ	ᑉ
t	ᑕ	ᑎ	ᑐ	ᑥ			ᔍ	ᑦ
k	ᑲ	ᑭ	ᑯ	ᒂ		ᒄ	ᔎ	ᒃ
ch	ᒐ	ᒋ	ᒍ	ᒠ			ᔏ	ᒡ
m	ᒪ	ᒥ	ᒧ	ᒺ				ᒻ
n	ᓇ	ᓂ	ᓄ	ᓏ				ᓐ
s	ᓴ	ᓯ	ᓱ	ᔄ				ᔅ
y	ᔭ	ᔨ	ᔪ	ᔽ				ᔾ
y	ᔭ	ᔨ	ᔪ	ᔽ				ᐟ
Other Symbols
h								ᐦ
hk	ᑾ	ᑶ	ᑴ					
l	ᓚ	ᓕ	ᓗ					ᓪ
r	ᕋ	ᕆ	ᕈ					ᕐ
