= Land-based education =

Land-based education is an approach to education that supports cultural resurgence and provides resistance to the effects of colonialism and displacement that have separated Indigenous peoples from their lands. Land-based education is place-specific, grounded in culture, and aims to strengthen Indigenous communities by reviving their reciprocal relationships with their lands through the practice of their land-based traditions.

== Programs ==
The programs centre land as the primary teacher, as Indigenous communities' knowledge systems are inseparable from their lands. These programs can have many goals, the main one being to transmit knowledge to future generations. Land-based education programs cannot be easily replicated elsewhere, as they are meant to be grounded in the cultural roots tied to a place and the community that has historically stewarded those lands. They can inspire other communities to develop their own land-based education programs or projects. That being said, there are many commonalities among land-based education pedagogies: 1. involve mentorship from community leaders and knowledge keepers, 2. encourage youth participation, 3. emphasize traditional languages, and, 4. use subsistence practices. Land-based education can be small or large-scale. In the words of Yellowknives Dene scholar, Glen Coulthard, examples of land-based education include but are not limited to: "'walking the land' in an effort to re-familiarize ourselves with the landscapes and places that give our histories, languages, and cultures shape and content; to revitalizing and engaging in land-based harvesting practices like hunting, fishing, and gathering, and/or cultural production activities like hide-tanning and carving, all of which also serve to assert our sovereign presence on our territories in ways that can be profoundly educational and empowering; to the re-occupation of sacred places for the purposes of relearning and practicing our ceremonial activities."

Indigenous communities utilize land-based education initiatives as a tool to strengthen their peoples against assimilation, foster decolonization, and assert their rights to self-determination. Turtle Island offers one example of land-based education. .

== Colonialism and indigenous peoples of North America ==
Ongoing colonialism across North America has displaced Indigenous communities from their homelands. For example, in Canada, laws such as the Indian Act, the numbered treaties, and other institutional phenomena like the Indian Residential Schools or the Sixties Scoop dispossessed people from their lands, causing inter-generational trauma, grief, and cultural loss amongst Indigenous scholars explain that the land is Indigenous peoples' primary source of knowledge and strength. By removingpeople from their lands, them from their lands, governments sever lifelines to the land, prevent people from passing their ways of knowing to the next generation, and facilitate the erasure of Indigeneity in Canada. Indigenous communities, family units, elders, and youth have all suffered directly or indirectly at the hands of the state because, as explained by many Indigenous scholars, "family and community kinship networks that provided emotional, spiritual and physical support have been brutally and systematically dismantled." Yet, Indigenous peoples have resisted Canada's ongoing assimilation attempts and shown remarkable resilience. They actively resist oppressive settler forces by continuing to speak their languages, stewarding their lands, and physically occupying their territories. Land-based education, grounded in Indigenous ways of knowing, is one of the ways Indigenous communities across North America continue to assert their identity and their right to self-determination and strengthen their people. Cherokee scholar Jeff Corntassel explained that the perpetuation of Indigenous cultures has always existed; however, cultural resurgence through land-based education programs or everyday activities within family units or communities will strengthen the transfer of knowledge to future generations.

== Benefits of land-based education ==
=== Cultural resurgence ===
Land-based education has many direct and indirect benefits for Indigenous communities. These programs generally aim to increase the number of community members that take part in traditional land-based practices and improve the quality of the skills practiced. By reviving cultural practices and increasing the number of knowledge holders, land-based education helps reinforce cultural identity and reinvigorate communities' cultures. The deep spiritual connections with the land, which were either severed by forcefully being removed from their lands or not transmitted through family ties because of institutional motivations and violence (e.g. residential schools), are helped to be mended by land-based educational programs. Being back on their lands and being guided by community knowledge keepers, Indigenous individuals can begin to strengthen and/or re-establish the reciprocal kinship relationships many Indigenous peoples have with their lands and all beings living on them. In addition, as mentioned by Cherokee scholar Jeff Corntassel, this cultural resurgence helps individuals and communities re-envision their lives beyond what the state has imposed on them. Increasing the number of fluent speakers and the number of people stewarding their lands through land-based practices strengthens their knowledge systems. They also assert their right to self-determination and effectively resist colonial assimilative pressures. These programs help Indigenous resurgence because, as explained by Indigenous scholars Glen Coulthard and Taiaiake Alfred, communities "turn away" from colonial assimilation efforts by revitalizing traditional community practices and disassociating from colonial values.

=== Community economy and health ===
Furthermore, having an increasing number of individuals practicing traditional skills such as basket weaving can provide communities with more sources of income. Also, since land is understood "as a relational component of healing and wellbeing," activities taking place on the land, such as ceremonies or education, have important mental health benefits for Indigenous individuals.

=== Broader societal benefits ===
Land-based education benefits go beyond Indigenous communities as well. In a time where climate change is threatening life on earth, land-based pedagogies can help strengthen a needed sense of environmental stewardship, especially among settler students exposed to Indigenous perspectives. In addition, land-based education programs that invite non-Indigenous students to participate, discuss and interact with Indigenous communities and traditional practices help settler individuals to shift their perspectives of Indigenous peoples and their ways of knowing. This shift in perspective further helps to diminish the harmful misinformation that historically and currently negatively portrays Indigenous peoples in colonial societies and continues to disadvantage and harm them today.

==== Decolonization ====
Land-based education has great potential as a tool for decolonization. As it centres education around reciprocal, respectful relationships with the environment and takes place on the land, it is the complete opposite of mainstream oppressive colonial education systems. By asserting their existence, Indigenous communities directly counter the immense environmental violence caused by colonialism, as described by Professor Kyle Whyte from Michigan University's School for Environment and Sustainability.

== Threats ==
=== Resource extraction ===
Land-based practices and education requires that Indigenous communities have safe access to land and waters. Canada’s economy is heavily reliant on resource extraction and development projects. The cumulative effects from environmental contamination, territory fragmentation, and losing access to ancestral lands are all imminent threats to Indigenous communities’ health and ability to take part in land-based subsistence practices such as fishing or berry picking safely. For example, in 2021, in the case of Yahey v British Columbia, the judge agreed with BlueBerry River First Nation's Chief, Marvin Yahey, who sued BC for infringing on their Treaty 8 Rights by continuously approving development projects on their lands, rendering the community incapable of fully practicing their land-base traditions. However, the communities whose lands are being affected by industry are also often dependent on said industries for the revenue allowing them to spend time on their lands. Even Indigenous communities could finance land-based education though shared industry profit outlined in Impact Benefit Agreements, the money received still stems from destroying their lands.

== Examples ==
=== Canada ===
==== Dechinta Bush University ====
Dechinta Bush University, also known as Dechinta: Centre for Research and Learning, is located in the Northwest Territories, Canada. It was developed in response to the National Inquiry into Missing and_Murdered Indigenous Women and Girls Call for Justice 16.21 by addressing some of the obstacles that prevented Inuit and Inuvialuit individuals from easily accessing post-secondary education. The program offers "accessible, holistic, and family-centered education rooted in Indigenous knowledge" facilitating northern Indigenous individuals' access to superior education. It is an institution that works closely with the Yellowknives Dene First Nation and other northern Indigenous people, as well as with northern academic experts from the University of British Columbia. This institution aims to bring knowledge keepers and Dene students together to practice Dene ways of knowing, and to learn what sustainable communities entail. In addition to learning traditional practices, students discuss readings on Indigenous political theory. Glen Coulthard, a Dechinta Faculty member as well as a member of the Yellowknives Dene First Nation, describes Dechinta Bush University as an institution that aims to "provide a model of education that promotes true self-determination and decolonization for Indigenous peoples in the North."

==== Kitcisakik Land-Based Education Initiative ====
As Arellano, Friis and Stuart (2019) explained, another way of resisting oppression and addressing dispossession brought on by settler governments like Canada is to educate non-Indigenous people about Canada's true history and Indigenous ways of knowing. This education must be Indigenous-led, not institution-led, to foster decolonization and genuine reconciliation, and thus would favour mutual respect.

The Anicinape community of Kitcisakik, who live in the La Vérendrye Wildlife Reserve in the province of Québec, would receive many groups of settler students (high school and up) for several days at a time. During their stay, students actively participated in traditional activities such as "talking circles on territorial politics or testimonials of Residential School survivors; observing winter forest trapping; knowledge sharing on medicinal plants; preparing and eating traditional foods; arts and crafts workshops; sweat lodge ceremonies; community gardening; or playing hockey with community members." In addition to being beneficial to settlers' critical self-reflection and education by allowing them to begin to be exposed to Indigenous perspectives and resilience, this program was also beneficial to the Indigenous community. This program supported the ongoing revitalization of the community's culture and knowledge systems.

These educational programs are also a direct rebuttal to settler colonial education systems that play an extremely influential role in assimilating Indigenous students and erasing true history. As effectively pointed out by Chelsea Vowel, Canadian elementary and secondary schooling include very little to no Indigenous history, depending on the province. Also, the curriculum is developed and taught by settlers, thus further supporting the immense bias within the history classes. Programs such as Kitcisakik Land-Based Education Initiative foster settler self-reflection and can incite settler students to reflect on their role in perpetuating colonial processes, harmful stereotypes, and false information.

=== Mexico ===
==== Schools in Chiapas ====
There are Indigenous communities in Mexico that, through the Ejército Zapatista de Liberacion Nacional (Zapatista Army of National Liberation or EZLN) movement, have full control over their education system. Since these programs are independent of the Mexican government, they better represent communal political traditions and are taught by members of the community.

=== United States ===
==== The Akwesasne Cultural Restoration program ====
The Akwesasne cultural restoration program is a land-based education program that came out of a settlement agreement in 1981 in the United States. Through the Natural Resources Damages Assessment process (NRDA), the Mohawks of Akwesasne, joined by the United States government and the State of New York, demanded that General Motors and the Aluminum Company of America provide compensation for the immense environmental damage these companies caused. The Akwesasne community suffered significant cultural loss brought on by the companies' environmental negligence and wanted to develop a program that would foster cultural resurgence among its people.

Taiaiake Alfred is a member of the Kanien'kehá:ka Nation (also known as Mohawk) who acted as the lead consultant for the community when developing the Akwesasne Cultural Restoration program over several years. Starting in 2004, Taiaiaka helped to create the program in close connection with the community through frequent consultations with 50 members. In 2006, an extensive scientific and academic report, guided by Taiaiake, was released. The study was overseen and guided by a committee of respected community members, ensuring that the program and study would be in the best interest of the Akwesasne community. Through an in-depth analysis of testimonies, documentation, and previous pertinent scientific studies, the report presented overwhelming evidence that GM and ALCOA had, over several decades, released well-documented environmental contaminants such as PCBs, fluorides, and heavy metals into the Akwesasne community environment and lands. These contaminants poisoned their waters and traditional animal and plant food sources, severely impacting their ways of life. Even though the report showed that cultural land-based traditions are still being practised, overall, "Akwesasro:non have been denied the opportunity to provide their families with healthy foods, to fulfill their traditional obligations toward the land, waters, plants and animals, and, denied the opportunity to pass on practical, spiritual philosophical and language based knowledge of what it means to be Mohawk." Historically, their culture and practices are deeply intertwined with the river; thus, being unable to physically or spiritually use the rivers has severely negative impacts on the community. The community's life subsistence depends on their lands, meaning that the industrial environmental contamination has also severely hindered their quality of life. For example, many hunters and trappers saw changes in the animals' meat and stopped hunting as much and stopped eating bush foods.

== See also ==
- Indigenous Resurgence
- Initiative for Indigenous Futures
- Traditional knowledge
- Traditional Phenological Knowledge
- Settler Colonialism in Canada
- Declaration on the Rights of Indigenous Peoples
