= Indigenous resurgence =

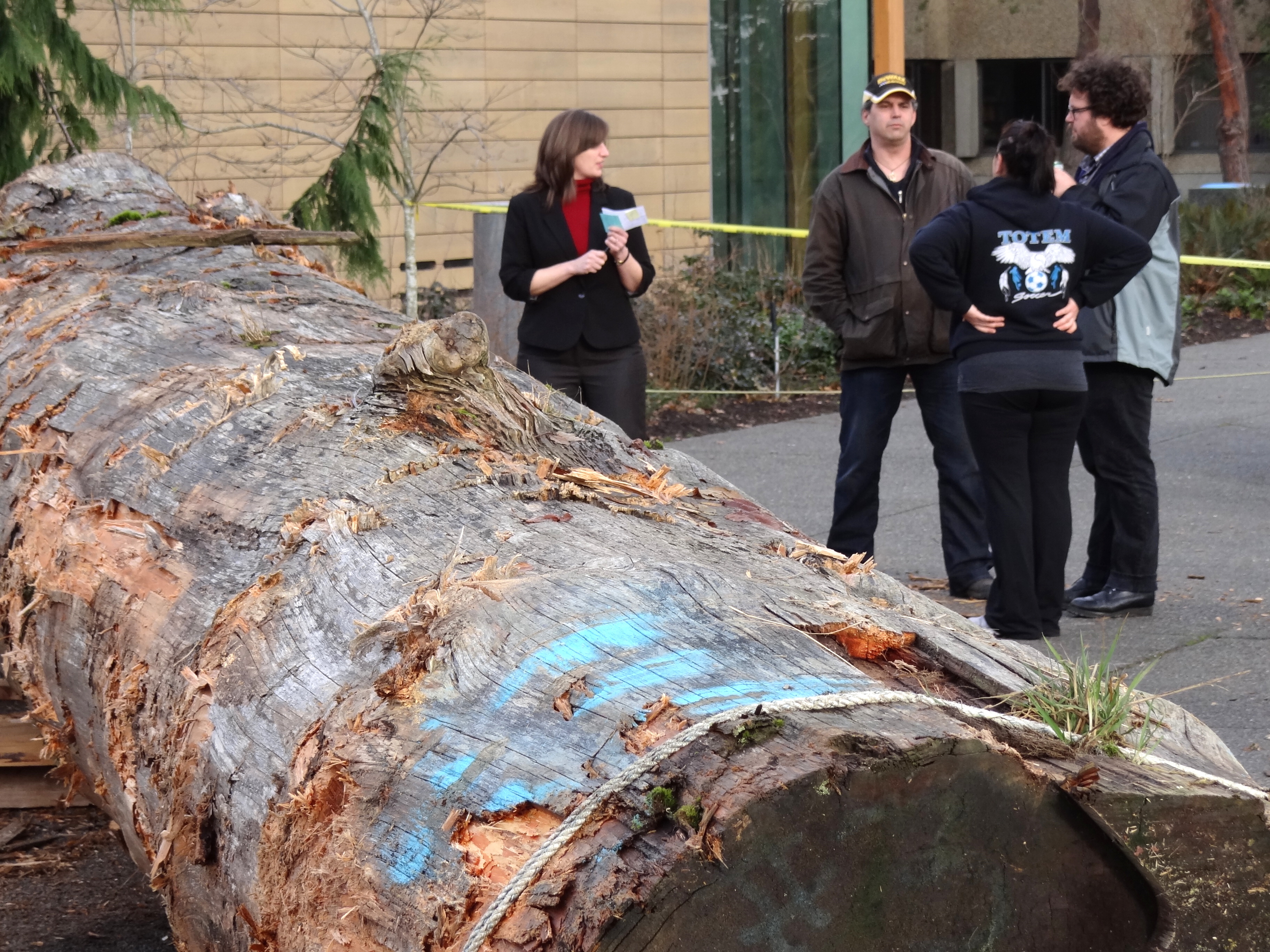
A log waiting to be carved into an indigenous canoe at the University of Victoria, BC.

Indigenous resurgence is a movement of resistance and decolonization. The practice of indigenous resurgence is a form of regenerative nation-building and reconnection with kinship relations, place-based existence, and the natural world. It reconnects with land, culture and community, and rejuvenates Indigenous practices of diplomacy, while also building solidarity with other BIPOC (Black, Indigenous, People of Colour) movements.

== Philosophy ==
Leanne Betasamosake Simpson (2016) explains that the indigenous resurgence movements were not created to change the current settler colonial system, rather resurgent movements are aiming for a different approach. She states that the way forward is to create new, alternative worlds with "profoundly different ways of thinking, organizing, and being because the indigenous processes that give birth to our collective resurgence are fundamentally non-hierarchical, non-exploitative, non-extractivist, and non-authoritarian."

Theorists of indigenous resurgence define colonialism as the dispossession and the erasure of people, bodies, histories, knowledges, ceremonies, sense of place and of the land. These are replaced with compartmentalized state-imposed definitions of indigeneity and of the land which value individualism and extractive capitalism.

Indigenous resurgence is defined as an individual's personal change through daily acts of resistance against the constructs and the limitations set by the settler colonialist state; to resist being what is expected and to live, study, work and act within the indigenous ways of being. This personal act transforms into community acts of revitalization that take into account the collective needs of the community and of the natural world, based on each community's own beliefs and traditional knowledge.

The acts of resurgence reclaim the indigenous storyline, a counter-narrative, drawing away from hurt and grief, toward a future of hope. Glen Coulthard states that indigenous resurgence is a movement of nation building and decolonizing through the framework of grounded normativity. This framework is defined as place-based solidarity employing indigenous or traditional knowledge. Its practices and procedures are based on reciprocal kin-centric relations among people and with the natural world. Grounded normativity does not engage with systems of white supremcy, heteropatriarchy, and capitalism.

The practice of indigenous resurgence is intended to create space for new ways of community development, engagement, and governance. Through mutual support and co-resistance by like-minded individuals and BIPOC communities, indigenous resurgence should affect real change in justice, politics, education, organization, mobilization and governance. The revitalization and regeneration of indigenous languages, cultural practices, land management, relationship building, spiritual connection and community solidarity are some of the benefits that the theorists of indigenous resurgence expect to gain.

== Actions ==
As the lands and customs of indigenous peoples vary, the actions of each movement may represent the peoples in a variety of ways. Taiaiake Alfred and Jeff Corntassel (2005) elaborate that, "There is no concise neat model of resurgence in this way of approaching decolonization and the regeneration of our peoples." There cannot be a “how-to” manual that can be replicated; each individual and each community should define their own terms based on their real needs and their own knowledge, using measures and practices to protect and to reconnect individuals and communities with the natural world.

The following actions are examples of indigenous resurgence movements occurring in Canada. The list is not exhaustive.

=== Arts ===
Indigenous musical group, The Halluci Nation (formerly known as "A Tribe Called Red"), is described as "adapting the music and culture of the contemporary pow wow, A Tribe Called Red exemplifies the remixing of tradition at the heart of the current indigenous resurgence." (pp. 29–30)

=== Food sovereignty ===
The Nuu-chah-nulth Tribal Council (NTC) in British Columbia sustainably and autonomously governs the use of the nation's traditional foods, including foods derived from their marine space. The nation honours the foods collected through yearly ceremonial songs and prayers. The food management policies allow for the revitalization of their traditional practices, to have food sovereignty and to create healthier communities.

The Batchewana First Nation (BFN) in Ontario is exercising self-determination and practicing food sovereignty through the traditional and sustainable management of small-scale fisheries situated in Lake Superior. This resurgence movement provides the opportunity for the BFN to revitalize traditional ecological practices and have jurisdiction over the waters they harvest from.

The Michi Saagiig Nation (MSN) located in Ontario have reclaimed their land and their waters. Through their traditional knowledges and practices, the MSM determines for themselves their peoples' rights to manage hunting, fishing, and the cultivation of wild rice on their lands.

=== Health ===
Indigenous-led health centres located within the city of Prince George, British Columbia, provide a sense of community and safety to its members. The focus on relationship building seeks to provide the indigenous community the safe space to participate in activities created for their wellbeing and to access health services designed to meet their needs.

=== Political ===
Idle No More is a movement of resistance and resurgence begun by indigenous peoples belonging to the lands located in Canada. The movement began in 2012 to oppose Prime Minister Harper's government changes, especially to Bill C-45 which contained changes to the Indian Act and to environmental protection. There were several acts of resistance and resurgence spanning the whole country. The movement claimed success due to mass communication across social media outlets.

=== Social media ===
During the COVID-19 pandemic, indigenous people created an account on Instagram to allow the safe space for indigenous people to share their resurgence activities. The aim was to engage and nurture community relations in a revolutionary way through social media, and to promote wellness during the time of social distancing. The account is “Everyday Indigenous Resurgence."

=== Storytelling ===
The author, Richard Wagamese, wrote his novel, Indian Horse, as a narrative of a Residential School healing journey. The protagonist, Saul, reconnects with the land and develops the capacity to share oral stories on this journey. Through the relationship building with his ancestors and the land, he finds identity and community. The novel itself is a form of storytelling as healing and resurgence.

== See also ==
- Land Back
- Indigenous astronomy in lands claimed by Canada
