= As We Have Always Done: Indigenous Freedom Through Radical Resistance =

2017 nonfiction book by Leanne Betasamosake Simpson

- Author: Leanne Betasamosake Simpson
- Publisher: University of Minnesota Press
- Publication date: 2017
- ISBN: 978-1-5179-0386-2

As we have always done: Indigenous freedom through radical resistance is a 2017 non-fiction book by the Michi Saagiig Nishnaabeg scholar Leanne Betasamosake Simpson.

== Form ==
The book combines personal memoir with Western critical theory, the thinking of Nishnaabeg elders, and references to traditional Nishnaabeg stories, particularly about Nanabush, whom Simpson reads as the prototypical Nishnaabeg researcher. It frequently builds on Simpson's earlier Dancing on Our Turtle's Back, the work of Glen Coulthard and particularly his Red Skin, White Masks, and the work of Audra Simpson.

Simpson writes explicitly from her identity as Michi Saagiig Nishnaabeg, and positions her work as primarily for Indigenous North American audiences, while also addressing wider audiences. Accordingly, for example, she asks "how do I live as an individual and as part of a collective in a way that ensures I recognize my great-great-great-grandchildren as Indigenous peoples?" and argues that

Very few Canadians will directly proclaim they are in favor of the position of Indigenous peoples in Canada, but a very large number of Canadians will do everything they can to preserve the social, cultural, and economic systems of the country, even though this system is predicated on violence and dispossession of Indigenous lands and bodies. Therefore, we do not need the help of Canadians. We need Canadians to help themselves, to learn to struggle and to understand that their great country of Canada has been and is a death dance for Indigenous peoples. They must learn to stop themselves from plundering the land and the climate and using Indigenous peoples' bodies to fuel their economy, and to find a way of living in the world that is not based on violence and exploitation.

== Summary ==
Chapter 1 reflects on Simpson's engagement with Nishnaabeg culture, and particularly what she learned from the Elders of Long Lake 58 First Nation. The chapter presents the concept of "grounded normativity" (also associated with the work of Glen Coulthard), which remains prominent throughout the book. By "grounded normativity", Simpson means an Indigenous "way of living that was full of community. A way of living that was thoughtful and profoundly empathetic. A way of living that considered, in a deep profound way, relationality" and "ethical frameworks generated by these place-based practices and associated knowledges".

Chapter 2 focuses on the theoretical consequences of Simpson's identification as kwe, a word ordinarily translated into English as "woman", but distinguished by Simpson from the English word: "Kwe is not a commodity. Kwe is not capital. It is different than the word woman because it recognizes a spectrum of gender expressions and it exists embedded in grounded normativity. Kwe cannot be exploited. There is a fluidity to my use of the term kwe that gestures to the gender variance within Nishnaabewin. Kwe does not conform to the rigidity of the colonial gender binary, nor is kwe essentialized." In the assessment of Tiffany Lethabo King, Simpson's use of her kwe identity "exceeds the stylistic and challenges the very premises of Western knowledge production that continue to claim a neutral, body-less, and universality that evades accountability". This identity underpins what Simpson calls the "Radical Resurgence Project", which "uses Indigenous interrogation, critique, and theory, and the grounded normativity these systems generate, as the intelligence system that instigates resurgence and is the process from which grounded, real world, Indigenous alternatives are manifest and realized".

Chapter 3, "The Attempted Dispossession of Kwe", sketches some of the ongoing history of colonial violence against Michi Saagiig Nishnaabeg society, and emphasises that its heteropatriarchal character means that this violence is amongst other things inherently gendered.

Chapter 4, "Nisnaabeg Internationalism", argues both that "Indigenous thought must propel resurgence" and that Indigenous thought must be open to eclectic engagement with other theories, such as "Western liberatory theories" and "the theories and practices of Black Radical Tradition, of revolutionary movements in the Global South, the work of Black womanists and feminists, anticapitalism, anti-white supremacists, antiheteropatriarchy" and "abolition". The chapter argues that both intellectual openness and international diplomacy are traditional in Nishnaabeg culture. It argues, moreover, that "A fundamental difference between Indigenous and nonIndigenous concepts of internationalism is that for Indigenous peoples, internationalism takes place within grounded normativity [...] my nation is not just composed of Nishnaabeg. It is a series of radiating relationships with plant nations, animal nations, insects, bodies of water, air, soil, and spiritual beings in addition to the Indigenous nations with whom we share parts of our territory".

Chapter 5, "Nishnaabeg Anticapitalism", positions Indigenous people as exceptionally well placed, through grounded normativity, to critique and offer alternatives to capitalism, partly by sustaining continuous traditions of non-capitalist social organisation and because "We have hundreds of years of direct experience with the absolute destruction of capitalism". Simpson argues against less radical stances, for example mere opposition to extractivism, suggesting that "Often Nishnaabeg people will participate in all the processes settler colonialism sets up for us to have a voice in this, except the processes are set up to reinforce settler colonialism, not disrupt it [...] Resistance to capitalism isn't futile, it's the way out".

Chapter 6, "Endlessly Creating our Indigenous Selves", focuses in more depth on the role of heteropatriarchy in the ongoing colonial dispossession of Indigenous people, and on how Simpson addresses this in the classroom. Simpson argues that "we need to shift our lens of analysis from one that plays into the limits of Western thought to one that is holy and diversely Indigenous at its core, both in experience and in intellectual thought, but that brings with it the most robust critical analysis of our times". The chapter also touches on how Indigenous modes of governance can handle intra-community sexual violence without the participation of colonial justice systems.

Chapter 7, "The Sovereignty of Indigenous Peoples' Bodies", further explores the how colonising culture has reshaped Indigenous gender norms (and continues to reshape them) better to suit the colonial project. The chapter focuses on how colonial culture has encouraged the oppression of Indigenous women, examining, for example, the racism and anti-feminism of the nineteenth-century white Canadian Susanna Moodie, the Indian Act, and Christian missionaries. In turn, Chapter 8, "Indigenous Queer Normativity", notes the oppression of people whose personal relationships did not fit the norms of gender and sexuality accepted by early Christian missionaries. In consequence, Simpson argues, Indigenous cultures' openness to two-spirit and queer forms of life has faced especially long-lasting colonial oppression and that current instantiations of Indigenous tradition sometimes encourage "the heteropatriarchy of settler colonialism". Simpson argues that "Queer [Indigenous] youth are telling me that most often they get crushed. [...] This is so unacceptable to me within the ethical frameworks of Nishnaabeg grounded normativity, and also so unnecessary. It is also infuriating because while there are a lot of things we cannot fix right now, this is one of the things that we can collectively take on and make better. Right now."

Chapter 9, "Land as Pedagogy", explores the nature of "Nishnaabeg intelligence" and argues that "We cannot bring about the kind of radical transformation we seek if we are solely reliant upon state-sanctioned and state-run education systems". A key reference in the chapter is a traditional Nishnaabeg origin-story for maple sugar (a crucial part of the traditional Nishnaabeg economy), in which maple-sugar is discovered by a child who by observes animal behaviour and whose insights are taken seriously by adults. Simpson argues that "If we do not create a generation of people attached to the land and committed to living out our culturally inherent ways of coming to know, we risk losing what it means to be Nishnaabeg within our own thought systems" but that "Raising Indigenous children in a context where their consent, physical and intellectual, is not just required but valued goes a long way to undoing the replication of colonial gender violence". Yet, Simpson points out, learning from the land is difficult when settlers oppose Nishnaabeg people interacting with the land in traditional ways: "Being engaged in land as pedagogy as a life practice inevitably means coming face-to-face with settler colonial authority, surveillance, and violence, because this practice places Indigenous bodies in between settlers and their money". Correspondingly, chapter 10, "'I see your light': Reciprocal recognition and generative refusal", argues that "Resurgent organizing must create a future generation that never has to ask how to live free, because they’ve never known anything else—a generation that does not know shame, because they are embedded in each other's light".

Chapter 11, "Embodied Resurgent Practice and Coded Disruption", offers case studies of art and activism that Simpson sees as offering paradigms for radical resurgence, focusing on the work of Rebecca Belmore and Robert Houle. The chapter articulates an idea of "Nishnaabeg aesthetics", which Simpson sees as shaping her work. The chapter also cites the Dechinta Centre for Research and Learning, the Onaman Collective, Toronto's Ogimaa Mikana Project, Kwi Awt Stelmexw, the Native Youth Sexual Health Network, "young moose-hide tanners in Denendeh", the Unis’tot’en Camp and the Grassy Narrows road blockade.

Chapter 12, "Constellations of Coresistance", focuses on contemplating the pros and cons of the Idle No More movement. The chapter advocates solidarity across liberatory movements, and expresses concern about the limitations on organising and activism through social media. The conclusion likewise focuses on case-studies of direct action and radical resurgence, particularly the Oka Crisis and the Reclaim PKOLS movement. Promoting a politics of refusal, Simpson argues that Indigenous people “don’t need a list of demands, because we are the demand. We are the alternative”.

== Reception ==
In 2025, Matthew Gravlin found that, "since its publication, [...] Simpson's As We Have Always Done: Indigenous Freedom Through Radical Resistance has garnered significant attention in Critical Indigenous Studies, and beyond, in decolonial and political theory more broadly. Her work exemplifies a body of thought that enjoins Indigenous peoples to prefigure their resistance to settler colonialism by embodying their ancestral nationhood", though he wondered "if Simpson voices an argument that effectively directs blame to Indigenous peoples themselves for their assimilation and adherence to heteropatriarchal norms".

Tiffany Lethabo King found that "Simpson’s work resonates with me as a Black studies scholar. I have turned to Simpson’s work for a number of reasons: its poetry, its experimentation with form, its theoretical import, its capacity to transform the reader’s desires, and her full-throated commitment to building alliances with Black communities on Turtle Island". She noted chapter five as "essential reading for scholars committed to anticapitalist struggles" and concluded that "Simpson’s As We Have Always Done will continue to be essential reading as Indigenous and Black freedom movements chart their presents and futures".

Brooke Ackerly read the work as a valuable challenge to settler-colonial academics and state functionaries, asking them to explore "how self-reflection combined with getting out, getting involved, and getting invested can improve on settler-colonial academics’ relations with the Nations on whose land we live and work and with whom we will be developing modes of governing and relationality toward a radical rethinking of the normative underpinnings of our broken, unequal, exploitative, and oppressive world". While largely concurring, Bryant Scott questioned what he saw as Simpson's tendency to present Western academia as monolithic.

Adar Charlton perceived the principles of the book at work in activism by Indigenous students at the University of Saskatchewan in 2018, emphasising how Simpson advocates refusal to participate in colonial bureaucracy and value-systems.
