= Indigenous astronomy in lands claimed by Canada =

Field of academic study

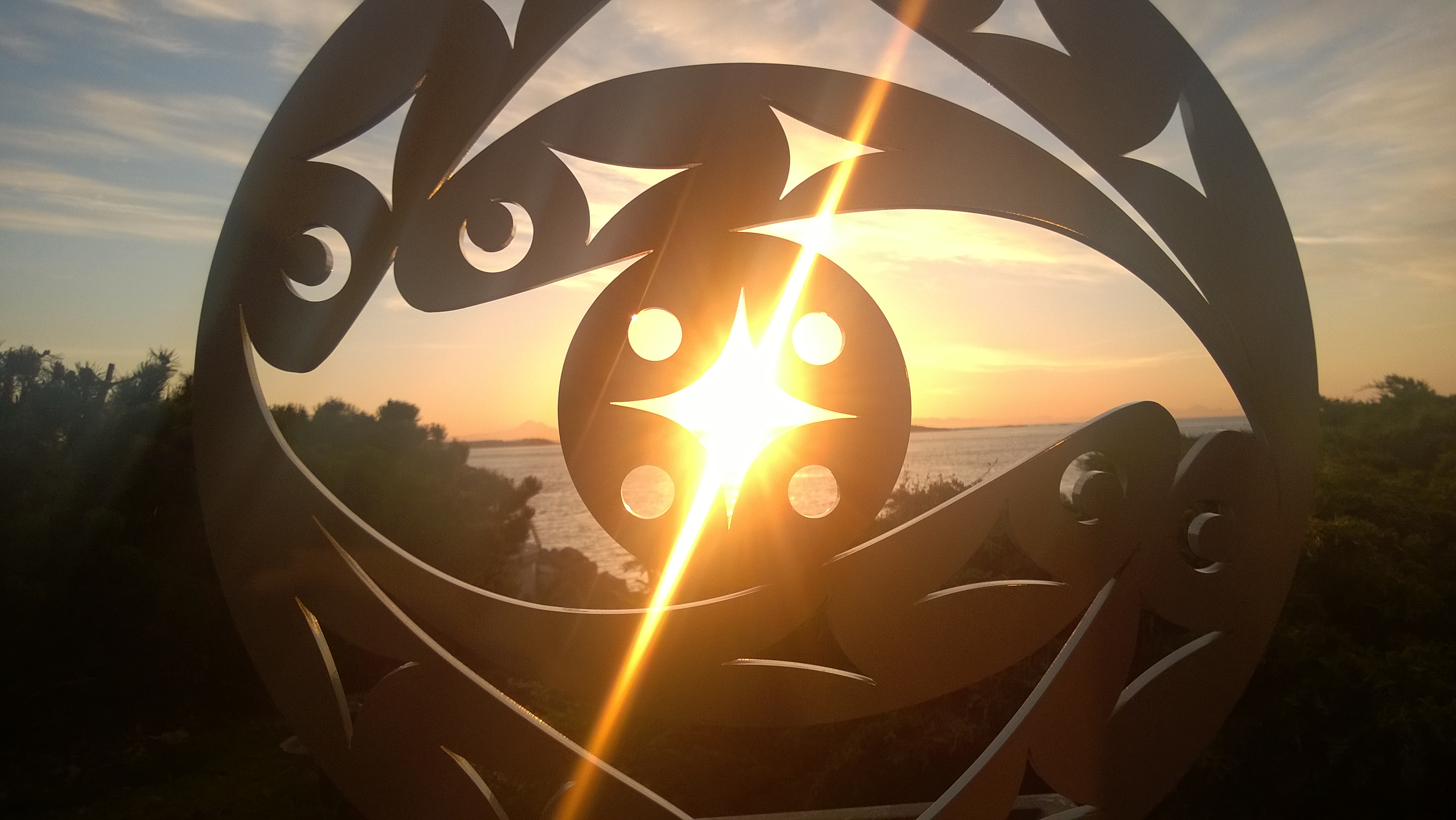
The Salish SUN, part the Salish Sea Walk of the Planets, an orrery on Cattle Point, Vancouver Island, drawing on Coastal Salish art styles.

Indigenous astronomy in lands claimed by Canada encompasses traditional Indigenous practices of observing, naming, depicting, and narrating celestial bodies, as well as work to bring Indigenous perspectives into scientific astronomical practice and education. It includes the peoples whose traditional territories include lands claimed by Canada, though those territories also extend into Greenland (claimed by Denmark) and into lands claimed by the USA.

The twenty-first-century Indigenous resurgence has led to extensive research into and publishing of Indigenous astronomical traditions by Indigenous scholars, and Indigenous astronomy has gained a significant place in Canadian school curricula.

== History of study, Indigenous resurgence, and challenges ==
=== Pre-colonial indigenous astronomy ===
The night sky is a living guide that has guided humans since time immemorial. The movement of stars would tell people when to plant and harvest food, and when frost was coming. Indigenous peoples used cosmic cycles to predict migration timing, mating patterns, and seasonal changes long before the introduction of the Gregorian calendar and meteorological seasons.

Some sources emphasise that intergenerational celestial knowledge has been accurately passed down through oral traditions and ceremonies. Other sources put more emphasis on variation in oral tradition. For example, the elders of Igloolik who informed John Macdonald's work on Inuit astronomy noted that their understandings of the sky might be specific to their particular families, while David A. Robertson has celebrated the variety of star-stories both within and across First Nations.

Indigenous astronomical traditions are partly shaped by a culture's local environment. For example, whereas a person on the equator can observe Earth's whole celestial sphere during the course of a year, the visible proportion of the celestial sphere diminishes the closer you get to the poles (such that a person on the north pole would only be able to observe the northern celestial hemisphere, with the same stars visible all year round). Thus more southerly traditions may reference more stars than northern ones. Indigenous societies sometimes used the appearance or disappearance of stars to measure time through the year, and the stars chosen varied with latitude. Likewise, light and weather affect observation: for example, in the arctic, the skies are only dark enough to observe stars for a minority of nights of the year, and, even on dark nights, the visibility of the stars is usually restricted by cloud, snow, or the aurora borealis.

=== Cultural genocide, and resurgence ===
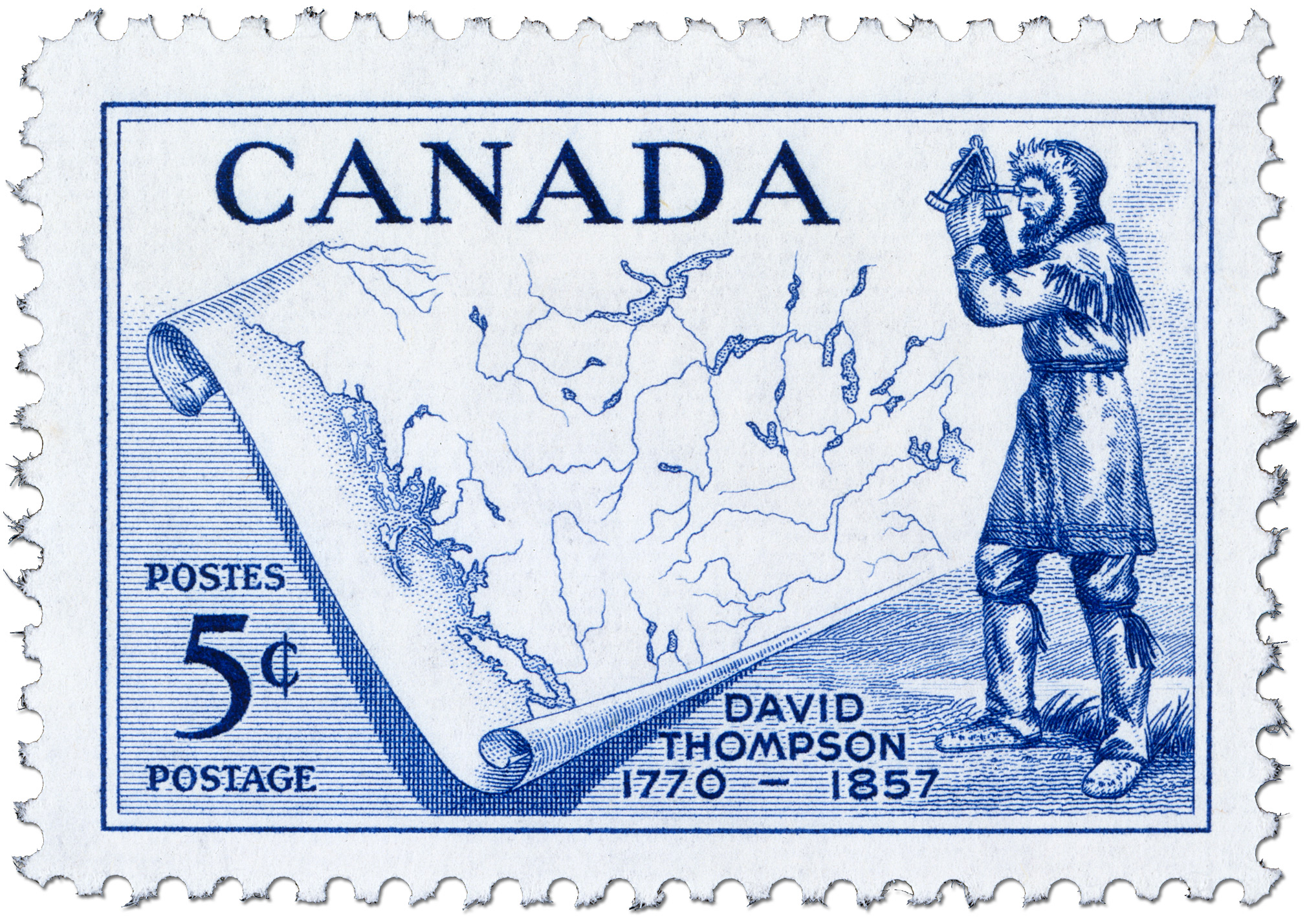
A 1957 Canadian postage stamp commemorating the colonial cartographer David Thompson and his astronomical knowledge. The participation of Thompson's Métis wife Charlotte Small is not commemorated.

Much traditional Indigenous knowledge was disrupted or even lost due to Canada's cultural genocide of Indigenous peoples, which included forced sedentarisation of nomadic peoples, the banning of traditional ceremonies, and residential schools. Cultural genocide has affected the survival and transmission of astronomical knowledge. Technological change associated with colonization, such as light pollution and methods of hunting that require less time outdoors, has also affected the transmission of astronomical knowledge. European scientific astronomy itself played a technological role in facilitating colonization.

Moreover, due to astro-colonialism and climate change, there is now an ecological mismatch between Indigenous tradition and the environment. The ongoing formation of satellite mega constellations is a type of "astro-colonialism". The prevalence of satellites in the sky can disrupt this Millenia long history of the indigenous connection between the cosmos and the land. It is estimated that one out of 14 lights in the night sky will be moving satellites by 2035. Today, there is a worsening ecological dissonance due to climate change. Earth's biological systems and cosmic cycles do not correlate the way they did in the past, with the timing of migratory patterns, harvests, and spawning runs, becoming misaligned with celestial signals.

Indigenous astronomy did not begin to attract extensive interest from colonial scholars until the rise of archaeoastronomy and ethnoastronomy in the 1960s–70s. Reports of astronomical terms and concepts by colonial linguists and anthropologists have often proven inaccurate, and research prior to the twenty-first century focused on more southerly regions of the Americas.

However, during the twenty-first century, Indigenous scholars began researching and publishing increasing amounts of information on Indigenous astronomy, testing the claims of colonial researchers and gathering previously unpublished knowledge. As of the 2020s, Indigenous astronomical knowledge is also beginning to be recognized as baseline ecological calendars, that monitor time by tracking seasonal changes.

== Local traditions ==
=== Algonquian-language cultures ===
==== Anishinaabeg cultures ====
A starry night sky, Muskoka, Ontario.

Anishinaabeg astronomical traditions connect celestial observations with seasonal changes and relationships with the natural world. The stars, Moon, and Constellations have tradionally been used to understand the passage of time and the changing seasons. Anishinaabeg understandings of the night sky vary between communities and geographical regions.

The Ojibwe Giizhig Anung Masinaa'igan (Ojibwe Sky Star Map), developed by Annette S. Lee, et al. 2012 illustrates several traditional constellations and their relationships to the seasons. These include:

- Biboonkeonini (the wintermaker), associated with Orion; Mooz (the Moose)
- Mooz (the Moose), associated with the stars in Pegasus
- Ojig (the Fisher), associated with Ursa Major
- Maang (the Loon), associated with the Usra Minor
- Jiinay Miikana (Spirit Path), associated with the Milky Way
- Madoodiswan (the Sweat Lodge), associated with Corona Borealis

One Anishinaabeg creation account describes a spider lowering the first humans from the Sky World to Earth through Bagone'giizhig (the Hole-in-the-Sky), guarded by seven sisters. This celestial formation is associated with the Pleiades in Western astronomy. The story demonstrates the connection between celestial bodies, spiritual understanding, and the Anishinaabeg accounts of human origin.

The Moon also plays an important role in the Anishinaabeg understanding of time. A traditional lunar calendar recognizes thirteen moons, with names reflecting season events. Examples include Makwa Giizis (Bear Moon), Miin Giizis (Berry Moon), and Minoomini Giizis (Wild Rice Moon).

==== Blackfoot cultures ====
Drawing of a Blackfoot buffalo-hide war shield, published in 1912 by Clark Wissler. The seven stars in the Great Dipper are shown in one half of the shield and a symbol of the Pleiades on the other.

According to Blackfoot scholar Eldon Yellowhorn, the Niitsitapi (Blackfoot people) understand celestial bodies as more than physical objects, the Sun, Moon, planets, and stars all represented as beings beings within long traditional narratives. These stories preserve cultural knowledge and describe relationships between earthly and celestial worlds.

The Sun, known as Natosi, holds an important place in Blackfoot cosmology, alongside the Moon known as Kookomi'kiisomm. Other celestial beings include the Morning star and Scarface, a prominent figure in Blackfoot oral traditions. The story of Scarface describes his journey to the celestial world and his encounter with the sun, who heals his facial scar. The narrative is connected to Blackfoot ceremonial traditions and reflects the relationship between humans and celestial beings.

Several constellations also serve practical and cultural purposes. The Big Dipper is associated with the seven siblings, whose movement around the North Star was used to measure time during the night. The Pleiades, known as Miopoisiks (Bunched Stars), are associated with a story about a group of neglected boys who became stars. The seasonal appearance and disappearance helped the Blackfoot determine the appropriate time for communal buffalo hunts. The Milky Way is know as the Wolf Trail and also appears in traditional Blackfoot celestial narratives.

As of 2005, Blackfoot astronomical knowledge continues to be shared through oral storyelling and educational initiatives. The Montana Skies: Blackfeet Astronomy Project, developed with Blackfeet educators and the community knowledge holders, presents traditional stories alongside Western astronomical explanations. These include the stories of Scarface, the Bunched Stars, and the Woman Who Married a Star, emphasizing the coninued importance of Blackfoot atronomical traditions.

==== Cree cultures ====
Aurora borealis and the rising Moon glowing over Chisasibi, Quebec.

Stars in the night sky viewed through a mīkiwāhp frame, Chisasibi, Quebec, Canada.

Cree communities tell many stories about the stars and use these stories to explain phenomena such as the calendar, the origin of things present in the world and morality. Wilfred Buck, a member of the Opaskwayak Cree Nation, has shared many Cree star stories in his 2018 book Tipiskawi Kisik: Night Sky Star Stories.

- Achakapis or Little Spirit is centered around the moon. It serves as a reminder that people must treat those less fortunate than themselves with compassion and humility.
- Atchakos Ahkoop or The Star Blanket centers around the Pleiades. The star blanket was given to the people by Atchakos Iskwew (Star Woman) and the seven points of the star blanket represents Pakone Kiisic (the Hole-in-the-sky) which allows spirits to travel through.
- Atima Atchakosuk or The Dog Stars is centered around the group of stars known as Ursa Minor. This story is used by Cree communities to explain "how human beings acquired dogs".
- Makinak or The Turtle is centered around the group of stars called Cepheus. These five stars serve as a lunar calendar to Cree communities.
- Mista Muskwa or The Great Bear is centered around the Big Dipper. This story is used to explain why leaves change colour in autumn and why robins have red chests. This story is told alongside Tehpakoop Pinesisuk.
- Sisikwun or The Rattle is a constellation which includes the star Polaris. It is used to signify the beginning of Spring.
- Tehpakoop Pinesisuk or The Seven Birds is centered around Corona Borealis. It is told alongside Mista Muskwa to tell the story of The Great Bear Hunt in which the bully bear is deemed to be a threat that must be removed from the traditional lands of other animals. So seven of the greatest hunters (Robin, Chickadee, Moose-bird, Blue Jay, Pigeon, Horned Owl and Saw-whet Owl).
- One of the oldest legends is that of The Sweat Lodge. This legend connects numerous star formations. Matootisan or the sweat lodge is centered around Corona Borealis. Mistapew (a giant) is centered around Orion. Matootisan Assiniuk or the heated rocks (sweat lodge rocks) are centered around the Pleiades. Keewatin or the Altar is centered around Polaris. Together, they teach about how the sweat lodge ceremony came to be.

==== Innu cultures ====
In 2024, a partly Indigenous team of Canadian academics and creative professionals reported on a then-ongoing multimedia project to gather astronomical accounts from the eleven First Nations whose lands encompass what is currently known as Quebec as part of a wider project called "Laissez-nous raconter" ("let us tell our stories"). They reported that Laurie Rousseau-Nepton, an Innu member of Pekuakamiulnuatsh First Nation and an astrophysicist at the University of Toronto, was leading the collection of Innu astronomical tradition. Her research had identified a vast constellation that traverses the Innu sky: a celestial canoe connecting the constellations of Utshek ("fisher", corresponding to the European Ursa Major) and Kuekuatsheu ("wolverine", corresponding to the European Orion). By Rousseau-Nepton's account, after this research, when she looks at Orion, she no longer sees Orion: instead, she sees all the stories associated with the Wolverine.

==== Mi’kmaq cultures ====
One Mi’kmaq sky-story, published in 1900 by the anthropologist Stansbury Hagar, that has become prominent in twenty-first-century education is "Muin [Black Bear] and the Seven Hunters", in which Muin "awakens from her winter sleep and, leaving her celestial den, descends to the ground in search of food. She is chased by the Seven Bird Hunters who pursue her through the spring and summer months, eventually killing her in the autumn and celebrating their success with a feast in winter. Muin’s life-spirit (wjijamijel) returns to her den in the sky to enter the body of a new bear who, in turn, wakes from her winter sleep, to once again descend to Earth and be pursued by the Hunters, and so the story continues eternally". An animated version of the story and a children's book is available in English, French, and Mi’kmaq.

The Mi’kmaw Moons Project provides resources for understanding the traditional Mi’kmaw lunar calendar.

=== Dene cultures ===
A prominent figure in exploring northern Dene astronomical traditions is Chris Cannon. Cannon, an assistant professor of Indigenous studies at the University of Alaska, Fairbanks has spent over 15 years with Elders from 34 communities in Alaska and Canada. Cannon wrote a book published in 2025 titled In the Footsteps of the Traveller: The Astronomy of Northern Dene which explores centuries-old models of knowing and being from a Dene perspective. Cannon also wrote a PhD thesis on Northern Dene sky-related knowledge.

- Yahdii is a massive constellation known by Gwich'in Dene communities, composed of Big Dipper or Ursa Major which makes Vitsì' (Yahdii's tail). The Pleiades are known as Vanch'àl (his snout). The Milky way as Są' Gwat'an Tąįį (trail of stars). The star 27 Lyn is known as Yahdii's heart. Yahdi also has a bag on his left side known as Va'ǫhtsùu represented by the stars Χ UMa (Taiyangshou), ψ UMa, μ UMa (Tania Australis), λ UMa (Tania Borealis) and a cane Vatòo represented by the stars as follows: top of cane: η Leo, γ Leo (Algieba), ζ Leo (Adhafera), μ Leo (Rasalas), ε Leo. Bottom of cane: all the stars between o Leo (Subra) and α Hya (Alphard) Yahdii's story tells one of creation, how the lands where the Dene live came to be, how animals and people came to be and more broadly informs Dene understanding of how learning is occurs through experience and connection.
- Nek'eltaeni is a large humanoid constellation known by Tanacross Dene communities. It describes how this giant pushed the sky upwards to its current position.
- In Dene communities the sun, moon and eclipses are all very important, seen as more than just celestial objects. The sun represents life and its movement is a model for how people should act. Moving counter-clockwise against the sun is seen as improper and therefore the Dene follow clockwise traditions. For example, food is served in a clockwise manner and ceremonies are conducted clockwise. The moon is associated with a boy in the moon. The boy's position is used to predict weather, resource availability and luck. As an example, a crescent moon tilted forwards can mean scarce resources and cold weather ahead. Eclipses are understood as a strain in the relationship between humans and celestial objects/beings. It could mean humans have broken the rules and have disrupted a careful balance. Dene communities often respond by mourning, singing or dancing to express respect and commitment to restoring the balance.

=== Inuit cultures ===
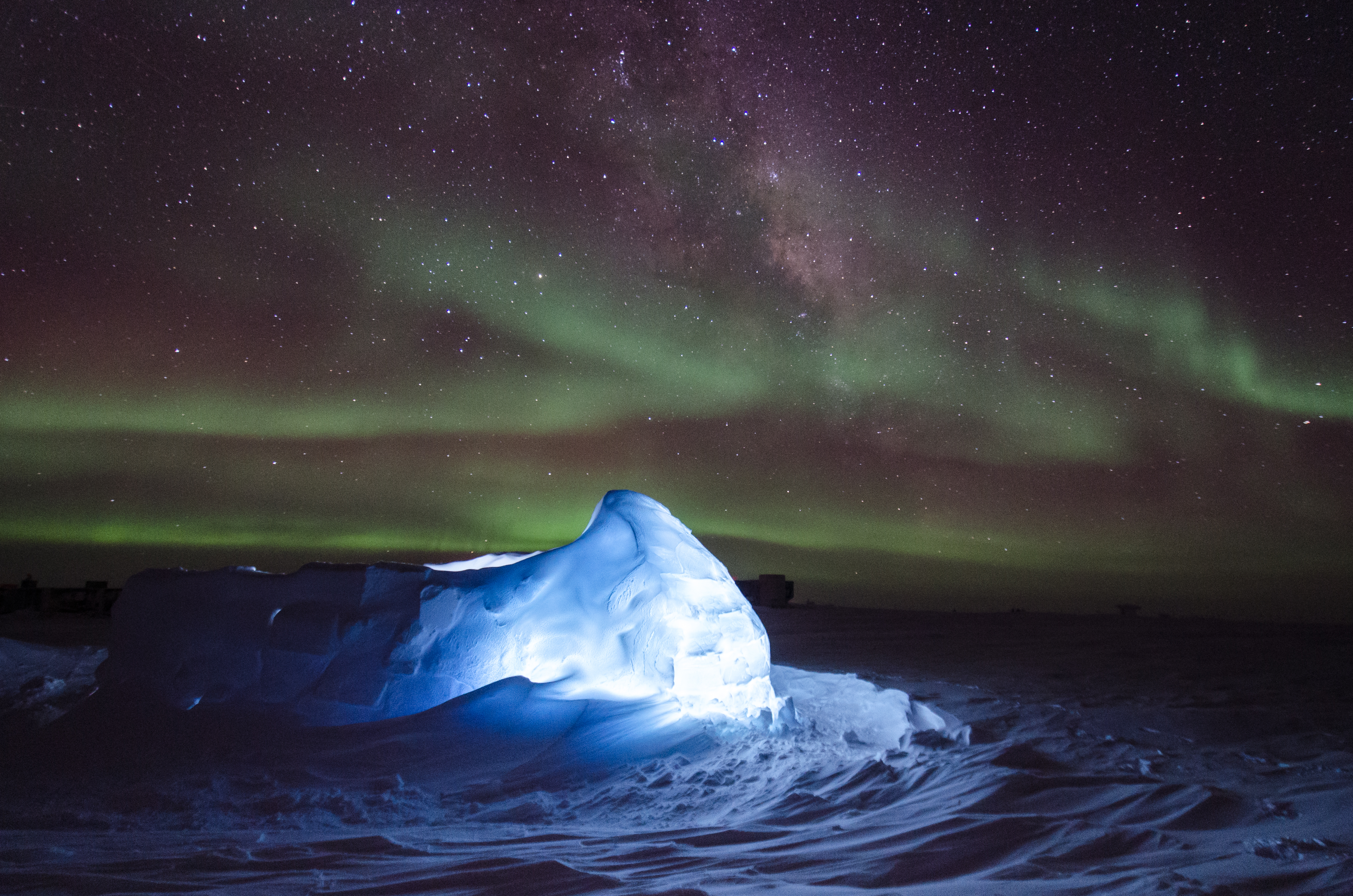
Aurora australis dancing over an LED illuminated igloo

Night sky at Templeton Bay, Nunavut, March 12, 2023

Indigenous Inuit Peoples have historically used the sky to track weather, seasons, and migration and breeding patterns of various species. Whilst some early scholarly material suggests that the Inuit had a relatively limited view of the sky in terms of constellations and spiritual meaning, this was largely due to a lack of translated documentation and misrepresentation from English ethnologists. However, Inuit traditional knowledge is considered to be characteristically personal, often specific to communities, families, or individuals. As such, Inuit astronomy traditions are rarely homogenous across the entire culture. In the 1990s, the Igloolik Inullarit Elders Society commissioned a major study of Inuit astronomy by John Macdonald, who interviewed elders. While Macdonald believed that he was witnessing "the rapid dilution, even imminent loss, of Inuit star lore" he thought that "by combining various strands of information [...] it proved possible to reconstruct the celestial sphere and its luminous contents more or less as traditionally projected by the Iglulingmuit".

Given their Northern location, some stars and constellations remain below the horizon year-round. For example, at the hamlet of Igloolik, stars having southerly declinations exceeding 20° are permanently below the horizon. As a result, well-known constellations such as Scorpio and Sagittarius can not be viewed in their entirety in most of the region.

Inuit Constellations and Principal Star(s)
Inuit Name (Igloolik)	European Constellation	Principal Star(s)
Aagjuuk	Aquila	Altair, Tarazed
Akuttujuuk	Orion	Betelgeuse, Bellatrix
Kingulliq (a)	Lyra	Vega
Kingulliq (b)	Orion	Rigel
Nanurjuk	Taurus	Aldebaran
Nuutuittuq	Ursa Minor	Polaris
Pituaq	Cassiopeia	Schadar, Caph, Cih
Qimmiit	Taurus	Hyades
Quturjuuk	Gemini & Auriga	Pollux, Castor, Capella, Menkalinan
Sakiattiak	Taurus	Pleiades
Sikuliarsiujuittuq	Canis Minor	Procyon
Singuuriq	Canis Major	Sirius
Sivulliik	Boötes	Arcturus, Muphrid
Tukturjuit	Ursa Major	Dubhe, Merak, Phecda, Megrez
Ullaktut	Orion	Alnitak, Alnilam, Mintaka
Ursuutaattiaq	Cassiopeia	Schadar, Caph, Cih, k Cassiopeia
Qangiamariit	Orion Nebula	M42
Aviguti	Milky Way*	

*The Milky Way cannot be viewed in its entirety from much of the Arctic region inhabited by Inuit Peoples.

=== Lands claimed by British Columbia ===
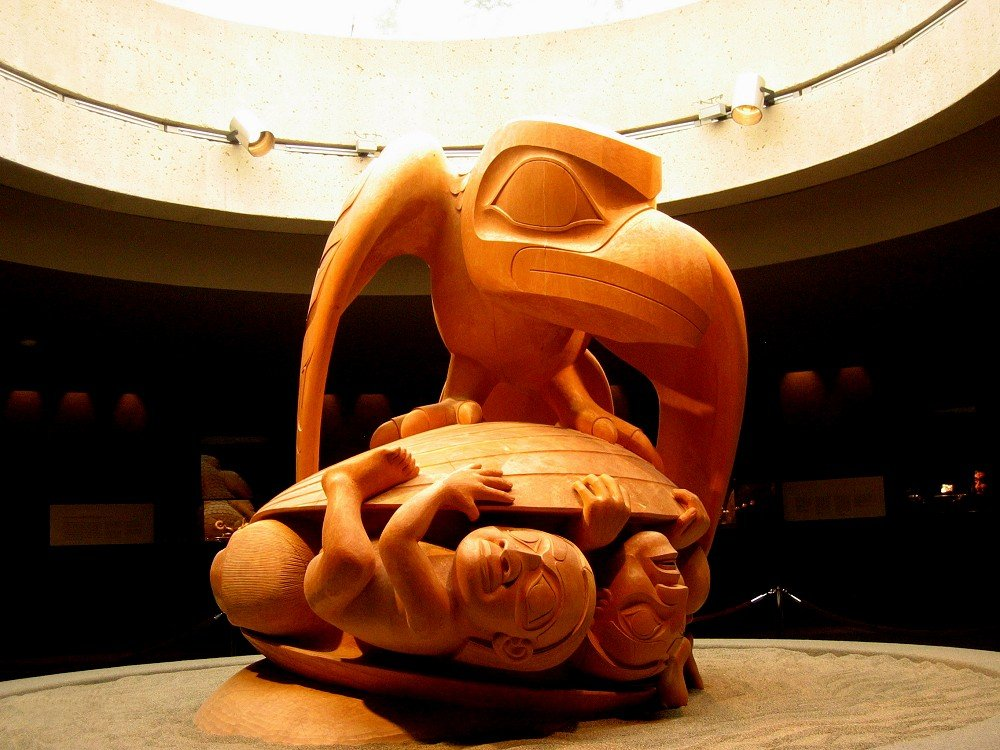
Raven and the First Men, a sculpture by Bill Reid.

At least thirty different language-groups on the north-west Pacific coast of North America, from Washington State, through British Columbia, to Alaska, share an origin-myth of the night that involves Raven stealing daylight.

In 2025, Grant Keddie, formerly the Curator of Archaeology at the Royal British Columbia Museum, published an extensive survey of anthropological and archaeological work on astronomy among the Indigenous peoples of lands claimed by British Columbia. His survey did not point to new work by Indigenous researchers.

The Tsimshian calendar indicates nine food moons, divided into three seasons. During the overcast winter, winds were the indicator. The Tsimshian term gyemk is a label for a moon-reader, one that can predict the food seasons. Nations observed on Andancaul a hill revered for links to the past, situated on the right bank of the Skeena River, almost five miles below Gitsegukla.

=== Stoney Nakoda ===
In the Stoney Nakoda language, the constellation generally known in English as the Big Dipper is called Sagowîbin, and stories are told about its origin.

== Influence on high and popular culture ==
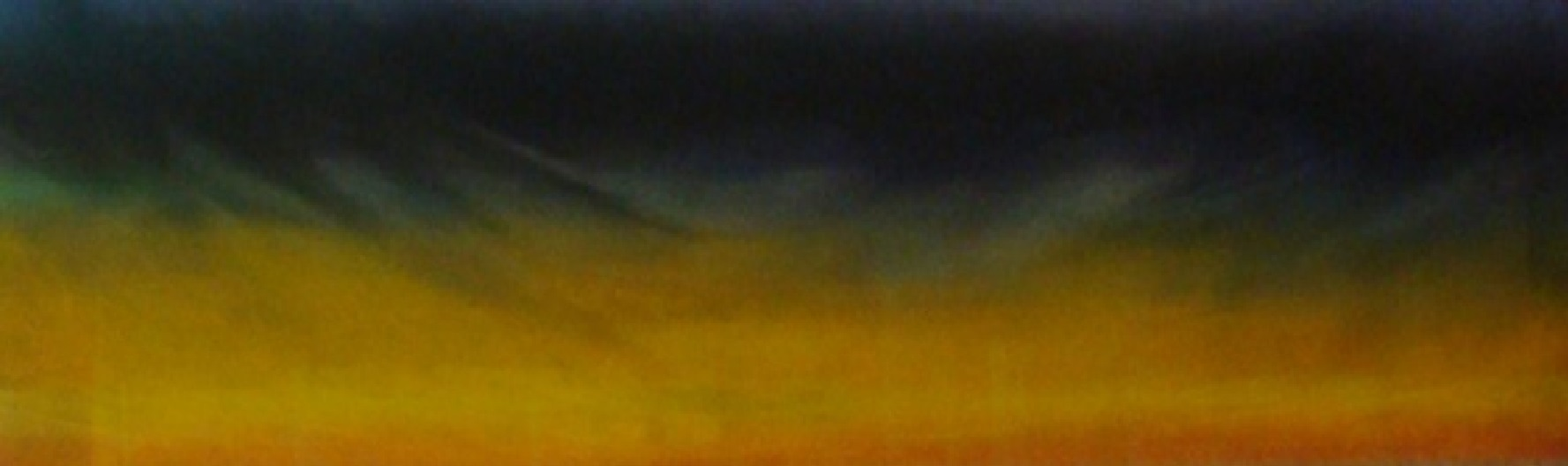
Sunrise, by Rita Letendre, 1989

From the 1960s, Indigenous astronomical traditions exerted a significant influence on the work of some Indigenous artists in lands claimed by Canada, among them Rita Letendre.

In the 2020s, many of the Cree stories collected by Wilfred Buck became the basis for plots in the Norway House Cree author David A. Robertson's Misewa Saga series of young-adult novels.

== In truth and reconciliation, and education ==
In a 2019 paper for the Canadian Astronomical Society, a team of astronomers, including Indigenous members, argued that astronomy textbooks devote little attention to Indigenous traditions, and tend "to treat Indigenous knowledge as ancient history and as something less valuable than western or Eurocentric science. This erases Indigenous knowledges in our classes and can exclude Indigenous student". They argued that Indigenous approaches can help to correct inaccurate histories of science and usefully complement the scientific method, and ameliorate the under-representation of Indigenous Canadians in astronomy.

A 2021 survey indicated that Indigenous astronomical knowledge was beginning to make its way into Canadian school curricula, alongside other kinds of Indigenous knowledges, while noting that curricula often left little space for any kind of astronomical study at all.

The Norway House Cree author David A. Robertson included "view the sky through an Indigenous lens" as one of his 52 Ways to Reconcile, published in 2025.

== See also ==
- Indigenous astronomy
