= Blachford Lake =

Lake in the Northwest Territories, Canada

Coordinates: 62°10′04.8″N 112°36′32.4″W

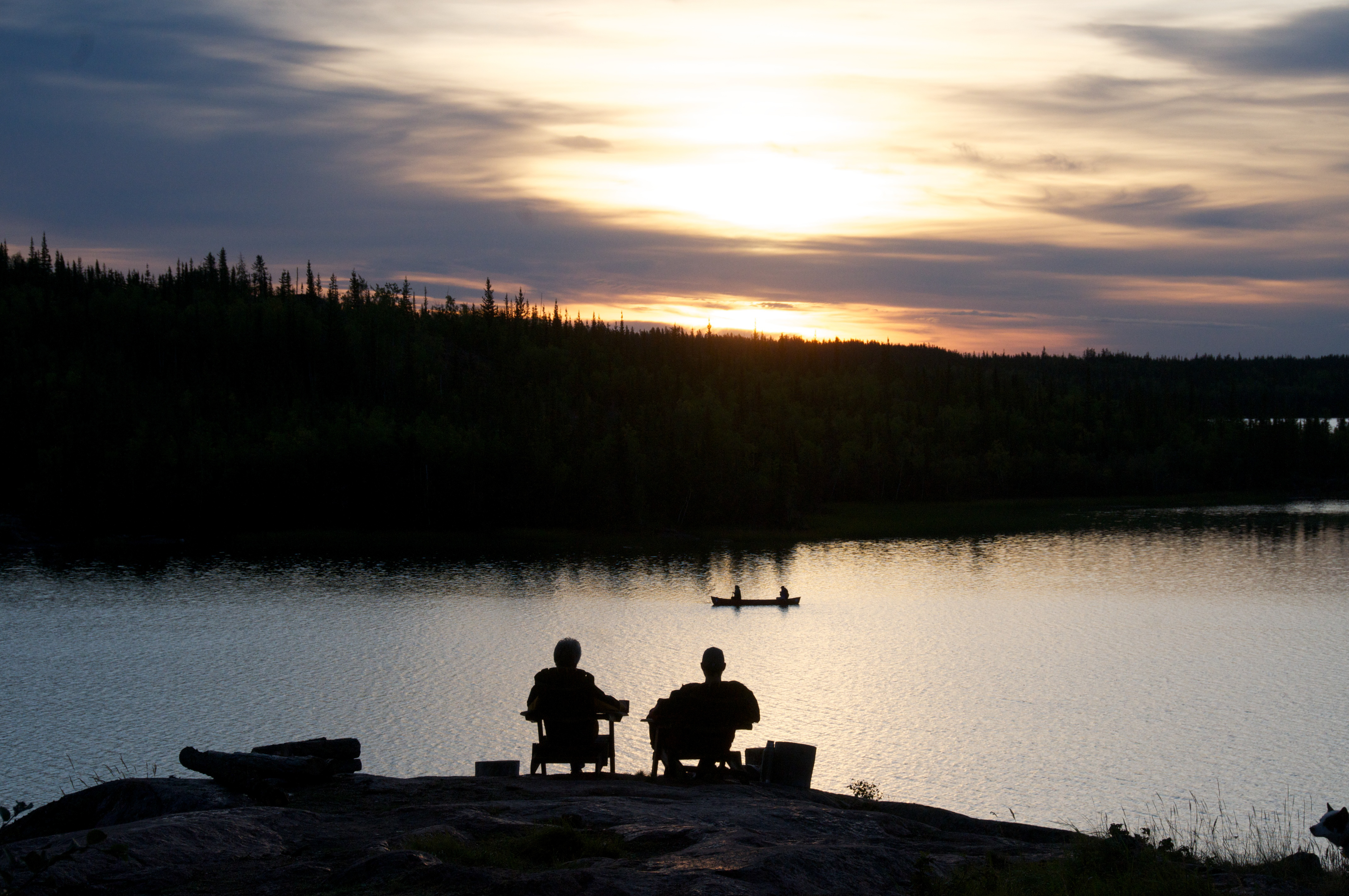
Evening at Blachford Lake in September 2011

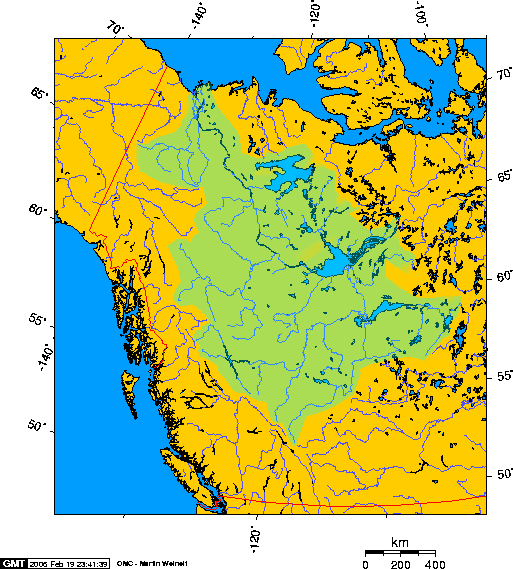
Mackenzie River drainage basin showing Blachford Lake's general position in the Western Canadian Arctic

Blachford Lake is a remote lake in Northern Canada, near Yellowknife. The lake is 17 km (11 mi) and sits on precambrian rock. The lake is located to the north of the start of the eastern arm of the Great Slave Lake. It is home of the Dechinta: Centre for Research and Learning, an on-the-land university, co-founded in part by Glen Coulthard, that teaches traditional northern skills.

== Royal visit ==
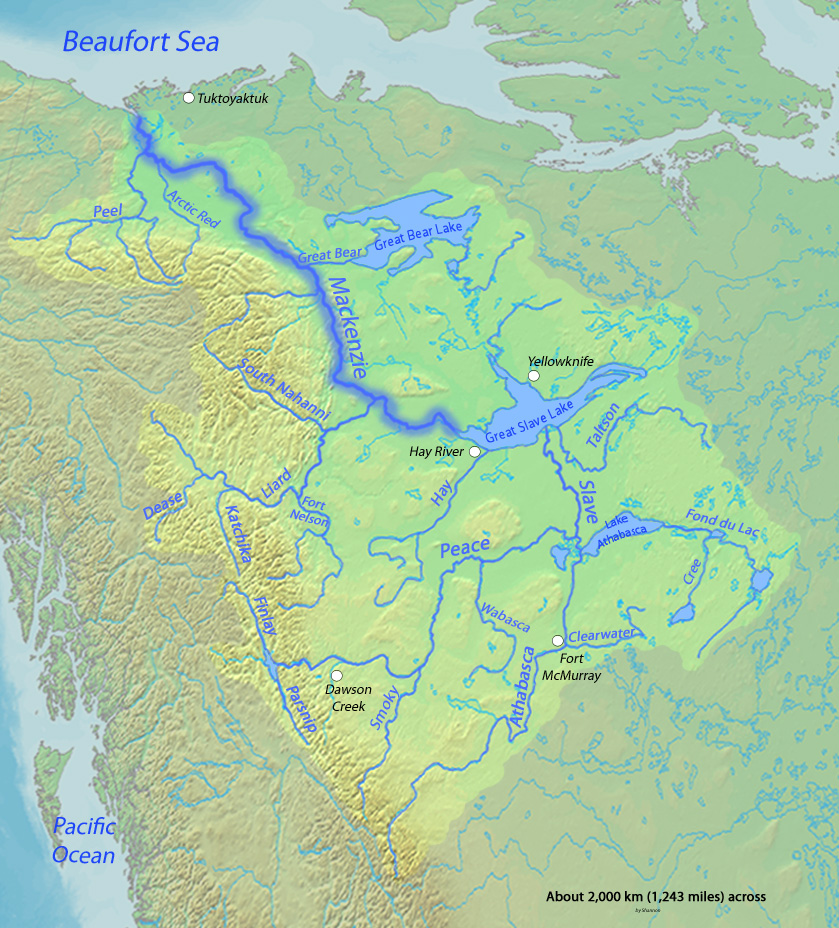
A more detailed map of the area surrounding Blachford Lake

The lake and Dechinta: Centre for Research and Learning was visited by Prince William, Duke of Cambridge and Catherine, Duchess of Cambridge on their 2011 tour of Canada; during the visit they were taken to an uninhabited island where they were prepared supper by a local cook.
