= TPK =

The initials TPK may refer to:

== Arts and entertainment ==
- Total party kill, in role-playing games
- The Paper Kingdom, an unreleased album by My Chemical Romance

== Businesses and organisations ==
- Tai Ping Koon Restaurant, Hong Kong
- Te Puni Kōkiri, a New Zealand government department
- Turun Pallokerho, a Finnish football club

== Other uses ==
- Code for Tanjung Priok railway station in Jakarta, Indonesia
- TPK algorithm, in computer science
- Traditional Phenological Knowledge, in anthropology
