= Glen Coulthard =

Canadian scholar

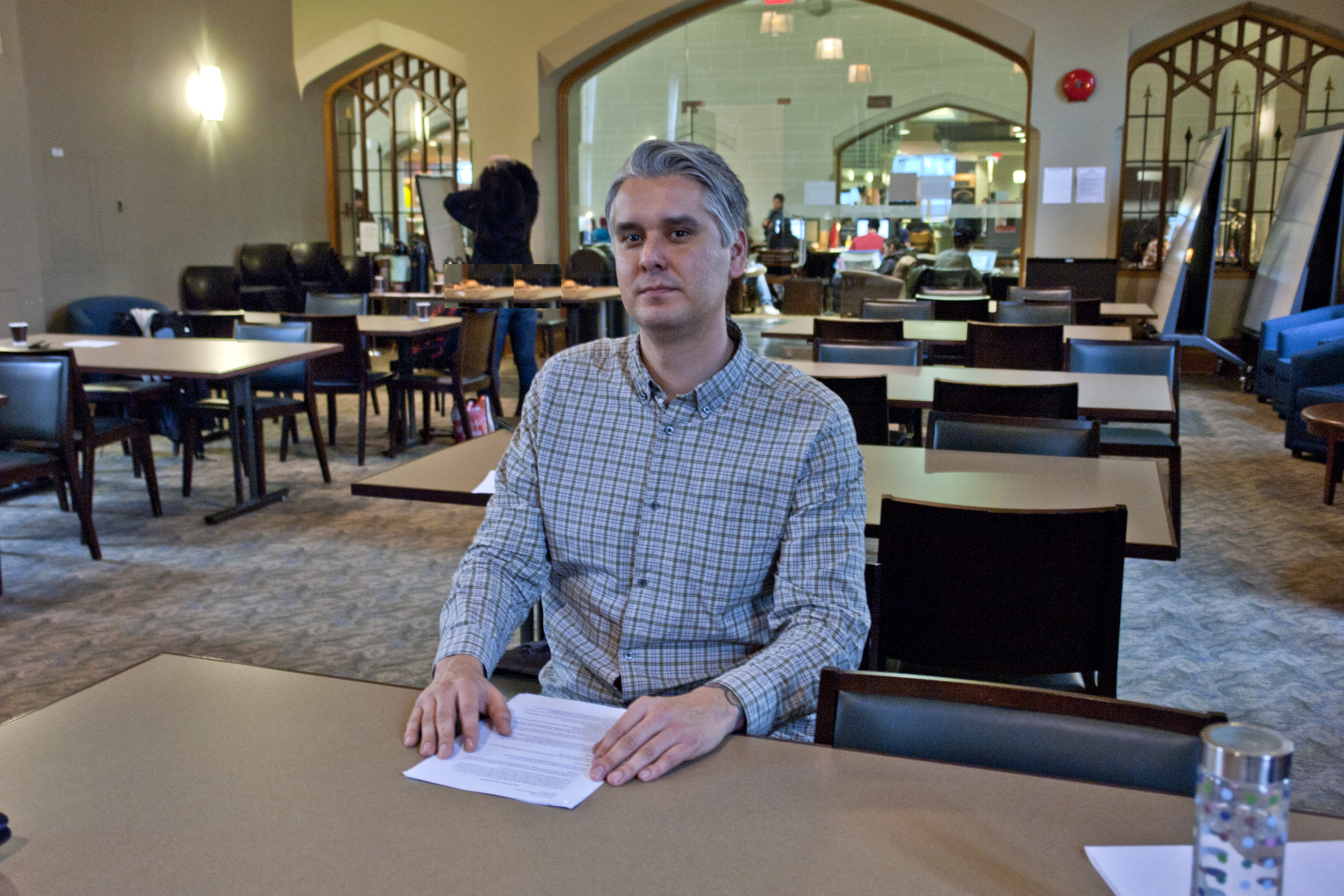
- Coulthard in 2013
- Born: Glen Sean Coulthard; 1974 (age 51–52)

Academic background
- Education: University of Victoria
- Thesis: Subjects of Empire? (2009)
- Doctoral advisor: James Tully
- Other advisor: Taiaiake Alfred
- Influences: Frantz Fanon

Academic work
- Discipline: Indigenous studies; philosophy; political science
- School or tradition: Marxism
- Main interests: Indigenous sovereignty; anti-colonialism
- Notable works: Red Skin, White Masks (2014)
- Notable ideas: Grounded normativity

Glen Sean Coulthard (born 1974) is a Dene-Canadian scholar of Indigenous studies who serves as an associate professor in the political science department at the University of British Columbia. A member of the Yellowknives Dene First Nation, he is also a co-founder, educator, and on the board of directors at Dechinta: Centre for Research and Learning. He is best known for his 2014 book, Red Skin, White Masks: Rejecting the Colonial Politics of Recognition, which has been released in both English and French.

== Education ==
Coulthard received his Master of Arts in the Indigenous governance program, as well as his doctorate in philosophy in the Department of Political Science, at the University of Victoria.

His masters thesis, entitled, Facing the Challenge of Freedom: Dene Nationalism and the Politics of Cultural Recognition, was published at the University of Victoria in 2003.

His doctorate dissertation, supervised by philosopher James Tully, was titled, Subjects of Empire? Indigenous Peoples and the "Politics of Recognition" in Canada, published in 2009 at the University of Victoria. A version of this writing, entitled, "Subjects of Empire: Indigenous Peoples and the 'Politics of Recognition' in Canada", won best article of the year after being published in Contemporary Political Theory in 2007.

== Work ==
After receiving his PhD at the University of Victoria in 2009, Coulthard co-founded Dechinta, with programming beginning in 2010. While he taught at Dechinta periodically, after 2015, Coulthard began spending half his teaching time there following a partnership between Dechinta and UBC.

Coulthard has visited various universities, conferences, and organizations, being featured on panels or giving lectures on topics of Indigenous politics and colonialism (see Recorded lectures/talks).

In 2011, Coulthard criticized police and Vancouver mayor Gregor Robertson for listing anarchists among the instigators of the 2011 Vancouver Stanley Cup riot, stating that, "More than the majority of anarchists would ascribe to non-violent construction of alternatives to capitalism, government, police, or more repressive regimes,".

In 2014, Coulthard released his first book, Red Skin, White Masks: Rejecting the Colonial Politics of Recognition, garnering various academic awards (see Books) and critical success. The Canadian Journal of Law and Society said that Coulthard's book "immediately establishes itself as a cornerstone in the areas of Indigenous governance, political theory, and activism." The title itself is a play on the title of Black Skin, White Masks by Frantz Fanon, a nod to the heavy influence of Fanon's anti-colonial work that Coulthard integrated into his writing. As activist and journalist Harsha Walia states, regarding Red Skin, White Masks,

Coulthard's premise is a forceful one: there is no freedom to be found in or from the settler-colonial state. Drawing primarily on Frantz Fanon, Coulthard interrogates how concessions by the state maintain both the objective and subjective realms of colonial power. He challenges the liberal pluralism of state-based efforts at recognition that serve to mediate and accommodate Indigenous claims through the Canadian state itself.

Red Skin, White Masks featured the Coulthard's coining of the term grounded normativity, which scholar Leanne Betasamosake Simpson describes as "the ethical frameworks generated by place-based practices and associated knowledges." The book features criticisms of the Truth and Reconciliation Commission of Canada, which Coulthard says ignores the ongoing nature of colonialism.

In November 2019, along with Angela Davis, the Palestinian Youth Movement, Winona LaDuke, and many other people and organizations, Coulthard co-signed an open letter calling on the United Nations to condemn the coup in Bolivia.

In December 2019, Coulthard criticized a Royal Canadian Mounted Police run drug prevention program for First Nations youth from Whatì, with accusations of poverty tourism.

Coulthard was quoted in various publications during the early 2020 blockades of Canadian rail lines in protest of Canadian invasion of Wetʼsuwetʼen land. As quoted in The Guardian, in response to backlash from Prime Minister of Canada, Justin Trudeau,

He has placed the onus, the burden of proof, on Indigenous peoples to demonstrate their commitment to reconciliation on his terms – or on the terms of a weaponized majority – by pitting so-called 'regular Canadians and workers' against Indigenous peoples who have been rendered minorities on their homeland due to colonization and a history of genocide.

In March 2020, Coulthard wrote an open letter to Minister of Public Safety and Emergency Preparedness, Bill Blair, in support of immigrant detainees on hunger strike in attempt to be released from Laval Immigration Monitoring Centre in Quebec, due to the COVID-19 crisis.

In October 2023, Coulthard co-signed a declaration of Indigenous solidarity with Palestinians in condemnation of Israel’s actions during the Gaza war.

== Listed works ==
=== Books ===
- Red Skin, White Masks: Rejecting the Colonial Politics of Recognition. (Minneapolis: University of Minnesota Press, 2014).
  - Outstanding Book, 2016 Caribbean Philosophical Association's Frantz Fanon Award.
  - 2014/15 Canadian Political Science Association's C.B. Macpherson Award for Best Book in Political Theory published in English or French.
  - Rik Davidson Studies in Political Economy 2016 Book Prize.
  - (in German) transl. Michael Schiffmann Rote Haut, weiße Masken. Gegen die koloniale Politik der Anerkennung. Unrast, Münster 2020

=== Essays in books ===
- “Beyond Recognition: Indigenous Self-Determination as Prefigurative Practice.” Ed. Leanne Simpson. Lighting the Eighth Fire: The Liberation, Resurgence, and Protection of Indigenous Nations. (Winnipeg: Arbeiter Ring Press, 2008).
- “Resisting Culture: Seyla Benhabib's Deliberative Approach to the Politics of Recognition in Colonial Contexts.” Eds. David Kahane, Dominique Leydet, Daniel Weinstock, and Melissa Williams. Realizing Deliberative Democracy. (Vancouver: University of British Columbia Press, 2009).
- “Indigenous Peoples and the Politics of Recognition.” Ed. Frances Negrón-Muntaner. Sovereign Acts. (Boston: South End Press, 2009).
- “From 'Wards of the State' to Subjects of Recognition?” in Andrea Smith and Audra Simpson (eds.), Theorizing Native Studies (Durham: Duke University Press, 2014).
- “#IdleNoMore in a Historical Context.” Ed. The Kino-nda-niimi Collective. The Winter We Danced. (Winnipeg: ARP Books, 2014).

=== Publications in journals ===
- “Subjects of Empire: Indigenous Peoples and the 'Politics of Recognition' in Canada.” (Feature Article: Theory and Practice) Contemporary Political Theory 6:4 (2007).
  - 2007 Contemporary Political Theory Prize for Best Article of the Year.
- “Review: Dale Turner, This is Not a Peace Pipe: Towards a Critical Indigenous Philosophy.” University of Toronto Quarterly (2008).

=== As editor ===
- Indigenous Peoples and the Law. Book Series. Eds. Claire Charters, Glen Coulthard, Mark Harris, Denise Ferreira da Silva (New York: Routledge).
- Recognition versus Self-Determination: Dilemmas of Emancipatory Politics. Eds. Andrée Boisselle, Glen Coulthard, Avigail Eisenberg, and Jeremy Webber. (Vancouver: University of British Columbia Press, 2014).
- New Socialist: Special Issue on Indigenous Resurgence. Issue no. 5. Eds. Gerald Taiaiake Alfred, Glen Coulthard, and Deborah Simmons.

=== Recorded lectures/talks ===
- Recognition, Reconciliation and Resentment in Indigenous Politics, with Dr. Glen Coulthard at Simon Fraser University. (November 9, 2011).
- Recognition, Reconciliation and Resentment in Indigenous Politics, with Dr. Glen Coulthard at Simon Fraser University. (November 16, 2011).
- Rage Against Empire: Resentment, Reconciliation and Indigenous Decolonization in Canada at the Vancouver Institute for Social Research at the Or Gallery. (February 25, 2013).
- First Nations & Direct Action at Singing a New Song Conference in Canada. (2013).
- “Red Skin, White Masks.” Unsettling Conversations, Unmaking Racisms & Colonialism at R.A.C.E. Network's 14th Annual Critical Race and Anticolonial Studies Conference at the University of Alberta. (October 2014).
- Glen Coulthard and Anwar Shaikh: The Violence of Capitalism: Race, Colonialism, & Capital at Historical Materialism Toronto. (2016).
- Global Movement Assemblages Symposium - Glen Coulthard at the Social Justice Research Institute at Brock University. (October 2016).
- Global Movement Assemblages Symposium - Leanne Simpson, Rinaldo Walcott and Glen Coulthard at the Social Justice Research Institute at Brock University. (October 2016).
- Studies in Political Economy Book Prize: Glen Coulthard, Red Skin, White Masks in Toronto. (May 30, 2017)
- Fanonian Antinomies at Simon Fraser University. (September 25, 2017).
- Global Red Power: Fourth World Resurgent in Auckland. (2018).

=== Other ===
- "Facing the challenge of freedom : Dene nationalism and the politics of cultural recognition." Thesis. (University of Victoria, 2003).
- "Subjects of Empire? : indigenous peoples and the "Politics of recognition" in Canada." Dissertation. (University of Victoria, 2009)
- Glen Coulthard, Mandee McDonald, Stephanie Irlbacher-Fox, and Matthew Wildcat. "Learning from the land: Indigenous land based pedagogy and decolonization".
- "Place against Empire : the Dene Nation, Land Claims, and the Politics of Recognition in the North." Article. (University of British Columbia Press, 2014).
- On This Patch of Grass: City Parks on Occupied Land. Sadie Couture, Daisy Couture, Selena Couture, Matt Hern, and Erick Villagomez. Preface: Denise Ferreira da Silva. Outro: Glen Coulthard. (Halifax & Winnipeg: Fernwood Publishing, 2018).
- The Fourth World: An Indian Reality. George Manuel and Michael Posluns. Forward: Vine Deloria Jr. Introduction: Glen Coulthard. Afterword: Doreen Manuel. (University Of Minnesota Press, 2019).
