= Stansbury Hagar =

Stansbury Hagar (December 9, 1869, in San Francisco, California-December 23, 1942, in New York City) was an ethnologist from the United States and an authority upon Peruvian astronomy. He graduated in 1892 (Bachelor of Arts) from Yale University and in 1897 (Bachelor of Laws) from New York Law School. He was a member of many scientific societies.

== Selected works ==
- Hagar, Stansbury (1896). "Micmac Magic and Medicine". Journal of American Folk-Lore. IX (34): 170–177. doi:10.2307/533400. JSTOR 533400.
- Hagar, Stansbury (1900). "The Celestial Bear". Journal of American Folk-Lore. XIII (49): 92–103. doi:10.2307/533799. JSTOR 533799.
- "Cherokee Star-Lore". Boas anniversary volume: anthropological papers written in honor of Franz Boas. New York: G. E. Stechert & Co. 1906. pp. 354–366.
