= Leanne Betasamosake Simpson =

Anishinaabe Canadian writer and musician (born 1971)

- Born: 1971 (age 54–55); Wingham, Ontario, Canada
- Education: University of Guelph (BSc, biology); Mount Allison University (MSc, biology); University of Manitoba (PhD, interdisciplinary studies)
- Occupations: Writer; musician; academic
- Employer: Dechinta Centre for Research and Learning
- Known for: As We Have Always Done; Noopiming: The Cure for White Ladies; Theory of Ice; Theory of Water; Idle No More activism
- Awards: RBC Taylor Emerging Writer Award (2014); Willie Dunn Award (2021); Hilary Weston Writers' Trust Prize for Nonfiction (2025)
- Website: www.leannesimpson.ca

Leanne Betasamosake Simpson ([liˈæn 'biːtaːˌsəmʊ'seː ˈsɪmp.sən]) is a Mississauga Nishnaabeg writer, musician, and academic from Canada. She is also known for her work with Idle No More protests. Simpson is a faculty member at the Dechinta Centre for Research and Learning. She lives in Peterborough, Ontario. Leanne has taught at many universities across the world. In her books she breaks boundaries between song and story, allowing the audience to go into a new world.

== Early life ==
Leanne Betasamosake Simpson was born and raised in Wingham, Ontario, by her parents, Dianne and Barry Simpson. Her mother is Nishnaabeg, and her father is of Scottish ancestry. Simpson's grandmother, Audrey Williamson (née Franklin), was born at Alderville First Nation in 1925. When Audrey was three, Simpson's great-grandfather, Hartley Franklin, moved to Peterborough to work on canoes.

Simpson and her family are off-reserve members of Alderville First Nation. Her grandmother and mother regained legal Indian status in the early 1990s following changes to the Indian Act under Bill C-31. Simpson and several relatives regained theirs after Bill C-3 became law in 2011. The children in the family regained status after Bill S-3 passed in 2019.

Simpson earned a bachelor's degree in biology from the University of Guelph and a master's degree in biology from Mount Allison University. She earned her PhD in interdisciplinary studies at the University of Manitoba.

== Academic career ==
Simpson is faculty at the Dechinta Centre for Research and Learning, and regularly teaches at universities across Canada. She was a visiting scholar in Indigenous Studies at McGill University and the Ranton McIntosh Visiting Scholar, University of Saskatchewan. She was a distinguished visiting professor at Toronto Metropolitan University. She is a past Mellon Indigenous Writer-in-Residence at McGill University. and is currently a Matakyev Fellow at the Center for Imagination in the Borderlands at Arizona State University. Simpson's work positions Indigenous ways of being within Canadian music and literature in the 21st century.

== Activism and resurgence philosophy ==
Simpson is active in Indigenous resistance and resurgence, anti-colonialism, gender-based violence awareness and the protection of Indigenous homelands.

=== Early political influences ===
Simpson's political consciousness and activist ethic began to develop while working on her undergraduate studies at the University of Guelph. Inspired by actions surrounding the 1990 Oka Crisis and one of the notable women leaders, Ellen Gabriel, of the Mohawk nation, Simpson understood that she needed to actively nurture a reconnection to her Indigenous Anishinaabe roots.

=== Idle No More ===
Simpson was an active participant in the Idle No More protest movement.

Simpson's activism is expressed both academically and artistically. She believes that movements such as Idle No More are most powerful when composed of a collective of community organizers, artists, writers, academics, and speakers that are mobilized through a grassroots, bottom-up approach who approach their activism vigorously and creatively. During the Idle No More protests she became a key figure in the movement after the dispersal of her article, "Aambe! Maajaadaa! (What #IdleNoMore Means to Me)". In this piece, Simpson articulated the importance of defending Indigenous land bases and life ways by emphasizing the interconnected relationality of Indigenous world views and meanings as intimately in connection with the land base.

Simpson articulates that the potential futurity of Idle No More was arrested by tribal infighting regarding allocation of extracted resources. Simpson understood these assertions of monetary rights as connected to the reality of endemic tribal poverty. Even so, she articulates that this caused Idle No More to be sidetracked from the larger critique that questioned the basis of such extractive policies to begin with. She explains that tribal peoples are in a double bind in that addressing the material needs of crushing poverty necessitates participation in the very extractivist system that caused the poverty in the first place.

=== Critique of extractivism ===
Simpson's activism is rooted in a resistance to extractivism, which refers to both the material extraction of natural resources from the Earth and the cognitive extraction of Indigenous ideas, i.e., cultural appropriation. Simpson critiques environmental reforms that operate from extractivist philosophies and explains that the solutions to impending environmental collapse cannot be based in extractivist methodologies. She specifically critiques the ways in which government and corporate environmental reforms extract pieces of Indigenous knowledge in the search for sustainable solutions while lacking a related cultural context and that their efforts only serve to reinforce extractivist methodologies. Ultimately, Simpson situates her critique of extractive capitalism within the larger framework of colonialism.

=== Indigenous nationhood and resurgence ===
A strong proponent of Indigenous resurgence, Simpson suggests an alternative ideology focused on rebuilding Indigenous nationhood using Indigenous intelligence and local engagement with land and community. Simpson's philosophy is grounded in an Indigenous perspective and is focused not on a return to the past, but on bringing traditional ways of living into a collective future. She articulates the potentiality of a collective future as one necessarily built without the exploitation of the earth and absent the ongoing acts of aggression against Black and Indigenous peoples. She derives inspiration from Black Lives Matter, NoDAPL, and the White Earth Land Recovery Project.

Simpson's academic writing on decolonial theory has been drawn upon by many Indigenous scholars, decolonial theorists, and Indigenous rhetoricians. Glen Coulthard draws upon Simpson's philosophies in Red Skin, White Masks: Rejecting the Colonial Politics of Recognition to explain that the solution to settler-colonialism cannot be found in Western epistemologies. He notes Simpson's imperative that Indigenous activists must begin to focus a greater part of their energies on building alternative modalities of living based in Indigenous worldviews.

=== Recognition, reconciliation and the Indian Act ===
Further, Simpson's approach is one based in rejecting assimilationist tendencies and state sanctioned recognition politics. Simpson specifically calls for decolonial action articulated via Indigenous decolonial theory rather than Western epistemologies and absent the approval of state sanction. Simpson critiques Canada's use of recognition and reconciliation politics as a way in which to neutralize Indigenous concerns by relegating anti-Indigenous and colonialist policy to a distant past which alleviates the state of any motivation to address systemic oppressions that stem from the settler-colonialist state.

Additionally, Simpson understands Canada's Indian Act system as a political imposition from the Canadian government for the purposes of maintaining power over tribal lands not based in Indigenous ontologies or relationality to the land base. Indian Act chiefs then are unable to act in the best interests of the tribal collective as they are ultimately beholden to the Canadian government. Simpson's activism is one that understands these systems of extraction and control must be dismantled.

=== Feminism and queer resurgence ===
Simpson's philosophy of Indigenous resurgence remains focused in reviving Indigenous ontologies through collective epistemic, pedagogic, and creative decolonization. Simpson articulates that such resurgence must remain focused on bringing traditional lifeways into the present but enriched with an understanding that Indigenous ways of being are rooted in a fluidity that lends themselves to future application.

As an Indigenous feminist, Simpson believes that the decolonial work of resurgence necessitates decolonizing heteropatriarchy from Indigenous movements. In particular, Simpson understands the centering of cis-gendered men as a holdover from colonial movements and Western frameworks of heteropatriarchal dominance. Dismantling heteronormative frameworks is key to Simpson's project and thus centers an Indigenous feminist/queer-centered approach.

In her article "Queering Resurgence," she approaches mothering and guiding her children through a decolonial perspective that challenges heteropatriarchy, heteronormativity, and the exclusion of queer Indigenous peoples. As part of reconfiguring Indigenous peoples' sovereignty, resurgence means ensuring queer Indigenous people are part of rebuilding the Indigenous community.

== Music and writing ==
=== Cultural reconnection and storytelling ===
Simpson writes about contemporary Indigenous issues and realities, particularly from her own Anishinaabe nation, across various genres, and is known for advocating for Indigenous ontologies. Her work is the result of a journey to reconnect to an ancestral homeland and traditions that she was disconnected from as a child and youth, living off the reserve. As a young person, Simpson immersed herself in her cultural traditions by connecting with Northern Nishnaabeg elders. Simpson's immersion facilitated a linguistic, cultural, and spiritual reconnection.

Additionally, Simpson applies Nishnaabeg's methods of meaning-making through Nishnaabeg's storytelling. Storytelling permeates Simpson's respective musical, fiction-writing, and poetic endeavors. She writes from an Indigenous worldview rooted in an embodied relationality to the natural environment. As an Indigenous mother, Simpson wants to raise her children within a tradition steeped in storytelling so they might learn Indigenous frameworks, spiritual belief systems, and Indigenous ethics to draw upon throughout their lives.

Simpson has now taken on the role of the inspirational artist/activist to youth as both a decolonial performance musician and artist, as well as through her academic writings. Simpson's approach to her work derives from an understanding of the limitations imposed by Western epistemologies and centers on Indigenous epistemologies.

=== Music and related books ===
As a musician, Simpson has collaborated with various Indigenous and non-Indigenous musicians to record and perform stories as songs. She is an alum of Jason Collett's Basement Review and her album f(l)ight was produced by Jonas Bonnetta (Evening Hymns) with James Bunton (Ohbijou, Light Fires). She regularly performs live with a core group of musicians, including Nick Ferrio and her sister Ansley Simpson. Noopiming Sessions is a collaboration with her sister Ansley Simpson and Theory of Ice includes collaborations with Jim Bryson and John K. Samson.

==== Islands of Decolonial Love ====
Islands of Decolonial Love: Stories and Songs, released in 2013, combines both the written and spoken word in a combined book and album project. Throughout both, Simpson utilizes English and her native Nishnaabemowin and deliberately offers only partial translations so that those unable to speak the language may glean a sense of her text. She also makes the stylistic choice to avoid capitalizing her poetry in this work to disrupt her readers' sense of colonized language use and its associated power relations. For these reasons, this work is considered to be one of her more challenging works for readers to understand as she employs decolonial mechanics of writing.

Using poetics, this project is a contemplation on what constitutes decolonial love, and rejects tropes of the mournful Native. Instead, Simpson's decolonial poetics focuses on the metamorphic force of decolonial love in all its forms. Embedded in Simpson's writing is a resistance to the conquered and sorrowful Native, wherein the processes of colonialism have engendered a sense of persistence and strength against structures of oppression. For Simpson, colonization does not equate conquest. Simpson's work frames decolonial love in a way that disrupts temporal, spatial, and gender frameworks and challenges normative notions of writing and communicating with the reader. In short, this work attempts to bring the reader in on the project of decolonizing worldviews surrounding love itself.

==== f(l)ight ====
f(l)ight, released in 2016, uses ways of Indigenous storytelling through a combination of spoken word poetry and song. It is a companion to This Accident of Being Lost that was published a year later. f(l)ight specifically works to challenge tropes of the melancholic and pitiable Indigenous peoples by expressing modalities of survivance, persistence, and brilliance. The album title is a synthesis of the words "fight" and "light" to create "flight". "Light" speaks to the beauty of Simpson's Nishnaabeg Indigenous culture and existence. "Fight" is a reference to the ongoing resistance of Indigenous peoples to their dispossession from sacred landbases and encompasses Simpson's philosophy of resurgence; intrinsic to the fight to regain Indigenous land is a resurgence of Indigenous lifeways and values interconnected to the land base. Finally, the combination of the two create the word "flight" to denote pleasure in the worldview of Nishnaabewin, the Eastern Ojibwe language, in order to imagine and formulate potential Indigenous futures.

Capturing the sounds and songs of the landscape were important in the making of f(l)ight. The sounds of rustling minomiin (wild rice) and sugar bush as well as the water flowing in the Crowe River were recorded locally within the Anishnaabeg Indigenous landbase and inspired Simpson's lyrics on f(l)ight.

==== This Accident of Being Lost ====
Complemented by and preceded a year earlier by the album f(l)ight, This Accident of Being Lost: Songs and Stories, published in 2017, is described as a fragmentary collection of short stories and poetry that encompass both the poignant and the humorous aspects of Indigenous ways of being. Simpson explains that Nishnaabeg peoples' rich tradition of humor has enabled them to survive and find joy in spite of histories of colonialism, dispossession and genocide. The title of this book and its preceding poem is a nod to the condition and ongoing struggle of Indigenous peoples who have suffered an ontological loss due to the violence of colonialism.

Stylistically, this work has a more intimate tone intended to bring the reader into a more intimate sense of relationality with Simpson, and this method is based on Indigenous modalities of oral tradition. Notably, Simpson wrote this piece with Indigenous women in mind as the intended audience which carries its own resistance to a publishing industry that caters to predominantly white audiences. Her insistence on splicing in Anishinaabemowin absent italicization and translation in this book speaks to her motivation in writing this book for Nishnaabeg readers. Ultimately, Simpson created this work so that Indigenous women would have some sense of seeing their lives and experiences reflected in a piece of literature, something she describes as markedly absent in most writing. For Simpson, writing from and for the perspective of Indigenous women is meant to frame their survivance in ways that resist victimization narratives; in this way she seeks to engender an empowering reading experience that speaks to the persistence of Indigenous women in the face of ongoing struggle.

==== Noopiming ====
Her 2020 novel, Noopiming: The Cure for White Ladies, continues Simpson's projects, this time via a blend of prose and poetry, in trying to counter the logics of colonialism and reclaim Indigenous alternatives and aesthetics. The title is a critical response to English Canadian settler and author Susanna Moodie's 1852 memoir Roughing it in the Bush. Simpson writes about the daily labors of healing and Indigenous transformation. Intrinsic to this collection is a contemplation of Indigenous relationality to ceremony and landbases with an understanding that ceremony is relational to the entirety of the earth itself. It asserts a future rooted in the still present past. Noopiming was short-listed for the Governor General's Literary Award for fiction in 2020.

==== Noopiming Sessions ====
Noopiming Sessions was inspired by Leanne Betasamosake Simpson's novel, Noopiming: The Cure for White Ladies, forthcoming September 1, 2020 from the House of Anansi Press, and created in artistic collaboration with Ansley Simpson, James Bunton and Sammy Chien, during the on-going social isolation of COVID-19. Noopiming EP is the first release for Indigenous run label Gizhiiwe.

==== Theory of Ice ====
Simpson's album, Theory of Ice, is the result of an ongoing practice in the poetics and aesthetics of musical relationship, the material originating in written poetry and worked into song forms through a collaborative generative process with bandmates Ansley Simpson and Nick Ferrio, producer Jonas Bonnetta (Evening Hymns), and producer Jim Bryson. The album was shortlisted for the 2021 Polaris Music Prize.

=== Other books ===
==== Dancing on Our Turtle's Back ====
Published in 2011, Dancing on Our Turtle's Back: Stories of Nishnaabeg Re-Creation, Resurgence, and a New Emergence offers a critique of neocolonialism and state reconciliation politics. Simpson promotes a relationship between the Canadian state and the various Indigenous nations that is one of sovereign to sovereign. She contends that state reconciliation efforts seek to distance the state from existing colonial traumas and in so doing enact a project of erasure of settler state complicity in genocide, Indigenous land dispossession, and concomitant assimilationist policies such as boarding schools. Reconciliation further ignores the ongoing present day ramifications of colonialism and actively silences and criminalizes Indigenous dissent while dissolving white Canadians responsibility in their complicity to the project of the neocolonial state.

Simpson's work offers a clear critique of the Indian Act as it has been utilized by the state to perpetuate ongoing settler colonial occupation and extraction of Indigenous lands as well as encouraging racist and sexist modalities. Employing Nishnaabeg decolonial theories of biskaabiiyang that utilize traditional Indigenous knowledge and philosophy to resist neocolonial silencing, Simpson asserts that Nishnaabeg dealings with the Canadian state be first and foremost based in such Indigenous epistemologies.

In order to move forward, Simpson contends that reconciliation be foundationally based in Indigenous movements towards resurgence. This includes implementing decolonial understandings that posit prime importance to the relationality between peoples and the natural environment. Simpson's work is an attempt to decolonize the politics of state sanctioned reconciliation. As part of this, individual Indigenous nations must be understood as respectively differentiated from other Indigenous nations in their dealings with the Canadian state. This is a rejection of state actions that understand Indigenous nations as a powerless monolith. Ultimately, it is a rejection of Canadian claims to entitlement over Indigenous autonomy.

==== The Gift Is in the Making ====
The Gift Is in the Making: Anishnaabeg Stories published in 2013, is a collection of Nishnaabeg stories rewritten by Simpson for a younger contemporary audience aged eleven and older and accompanied with full page black and white illustrations. While twenty of the stories are based in traditional Nishnaabeg folklore, there is one story included by Simpson that she wrote for her own children. Following traditional practice, Simpson related these stories via oral tradition and notes that these stories are meant to be shared primarily in the winter season. Simpson incorporates Nishnaabeg language when invoking place names, animal names, and seasonal contexts and includes their definitions so youth may begin to have an understanding of Nishnaabeg language. They are both commonly known stories as well as more obscure tales but Simpson's tellings are reworked to account for modern day life so they retain their relevance to young audiences.

Simpson's motivation in crafting these retellings was to decolonize the colonial matrices that many of the stories became mired in over many generations of colonialism. These matrices perpetuated European patriarchal norms that included moral shaming of female characters in addition to encouraging adherence to authoritarianism. Simpson's impulse is rooted in an Indigenous resurgence of decolonial reclamation. Ultimately, Simpson understands that stories hold great meaning for Indigenous peoples in their ability to transmit Indigenous ontologies, values, and political modalities.

==== As We Have Always Done ====
In As We Have Always Done: Indigenous Freedom Through Radical Resistance, published in 2017, Simpson articulates Indigenous political resurgence as a practice rooted in uniquely Indigenous thinking and practice. She calls for an Indigenous resurgence rooted not in demands for assimilation but in offering land-based Indigenous alternatives to colonial hegemony. In chapter 9, "Land and Pedagogy", an essay for which Simpson won the "Most thought-provoking" award in Native and Indigenous Studies, she uses stories of the Nishnaabeg people to argue for a radical break from state education systems designed to produce settler colonial subjects and advocates instead for a form of education that reclaims land as pedagogy, both as process and context for a rebellious transformation of Nishnaabeg intelligence and identity. The result, she contends, will be a generation of Nishnaabeg peoples with the knowledge and skills necessary to rebuild a society based on Nishnaabeg values.

==== Rehearsals for Living ====
Robyn Maynard and Leanne Betasamosake Simpson's Rehearsals for Living is a written exchange between two Canadian authors and activists on the subject of current social directions. The epistolary book consists of dialogue and correspondence between the two writers during stay-at-home orders, presenting Black and Indigenous perspectives on the present, the history of slavery and colonization, and potential post-pandemic futures. It was published by Knopf Canada in Spring 2022.

=== Edited collections ===
==== Lighting the Eighth Fire ====
The 7th Fire Prophecy of the Nishnaabe peoples which foretells of the Oskimaadiziig (New People) coming forth to revive Indigenous traditions, ways of life and world views, stimulated Simpson to edit her first collection of essays in 2008 titled Lighting the Eighth Fire: The Liberation, Resurgence, and Protection of Indigenous Nations. This publication is a collection of 13 chapters written by Indigenous scholars who approach their contributions from the framework of 4th World Theory, which specifically centers Indigenous epistemologies and ontologies. Lighting the Eighth Fire rejects monolithic frameworks of pan-Indianism and opts instead for an approach that highlights the respective philosophies of each contributor's respective nation of Indigenous peoples. Each chapter is laid out in such a way that the past temporal landscape of Indigenous stories, histories, and modalities of spirit are relationally connected to present impulses of resurgence and potential futurities. Reviewed: Untitled: Reviewed Work: Lighting the Eighth Fire: The Liberation, Resurgence, and Protection of Indigenous Nations.

==== This Is an Honour Song ====
This Is an Honour Song: 20 Years Since the Blockades, An Anthology of Writing on the "Oka" Crisis, published in 2010, is a collection edited by Simpson and political science professor Kiera Ladner. This compilation explores the resonance of the events known as the Oka crisis in the summer of 1990 when a group of Kanien'kehaka people defended their territories against plans for a proposed golf course over a sacred grove of pines. In particular, rather than rehashing the history of events, the book reflects on the impact the events had on a later political and artistic resurgence among Indigenous peoples as well as the role the events played in undermining colonial myths among the Canadian settler community.

==== The Winter We Danced ====
Simpson contributed as one of several leading editors for The Winter We Danced: Voices from the Past, the Future and the Idle No More Movement (edited with Kino-nda-niimi Collective) published in 2014. Kino-nda-niimi literally translates to "those who continue to dance". This text is an homage to those "dancers". While this book is primarily understood as a compilation of academic essays it notably incorporates the soul of the movement through the interspersion of photography, artwork, and poetry. This anthology pays homage to the activists of Idle No More but also encourages the spirit of the movement to continue onward into the future. It celebrates Idle No More's Indigenous centrality in both its organization, philosophy, scope, and participation.

It is notable that much of the work contained within this anthology was penned or created during the height of the Idle No More's most active times of mobilization and offers the insights of activists as they were participating in active struggle. This book offers a window into Idle No More's focus on the importance of Indigenous communities' relationality to their landbase and its vision for the potential of Indigenous futurity. The work within explores the reality of the labor necessary in healing the pain of colonially induced inter-generational trauma and the role of Indigenous persistence in maintaining Indigenous ways of being through ceremony and collectivity. In alignment with the spirit of Idle No More's activist base, all proceeds from the sale of this book are put directly back to Indigenous Canadian communities and the Native Youth Sexual Health Network in particular.

== Awards and honours ==
=== Literary awards and shortlistings ===
- 2014 – Inaugural RBC Taylor Emerging Writer Award, selected by Thomas King.
- 2014 – Shortlisted for the ReLit Award for short fiction for Islands of Decolonial Love.
- 2017 – Finalist for the Rogers Writers' Trust Fiction Prize for This Accident of Being Lost.
- 2018 – Finalist for the Trillium Book Award and shortlisted for the ReLit Award for short fiction for This Accident of Being Lost.
- 2020 – Finalist for the Governor General's Award for English-language fiction for Noopiming: The Cure for White Ladies. The shortlist was announced in 2021.
- 2021 – Shortlisted for the ReLit Award for novels for Noopiming: The Cure for White Ladies.
- 2022 – Shortlisted for the Dublin Literary Award for Noopiming: The Cure for White Ladies.
- 2025 – Won the Hilary Weston Writers' Trust Prize for Nonfiction for Theory of Water: Nishnaabe Maps to the Times Ahead.

=== Scholarly awards ===
- 2015 – The Native American and Indigenous Studies Association recognized "Land as Pedagogy: Nishnaabeg Intelligence and Rebellious Transformation" as the most thought-provoking article of 2014 in the field.
- 2017 – The Native American and Indigenous Studies Association named As We Have Always Done: Indigenous Freedom Through Radical Resistance Best Subsequent Book of 2017.

=== Music awards and shortlistings ===
- 2021 – Won the Prism Prize's Willie Dunn Award.
- 2021 – Shortlisted for the Polaris Music Prize for Theory of Ice.

== Bibliography ==
=== Books ===
Non-fiction

- Rehearsals for Living, Robyn Maynard & Leanne Betasamosake Simpson (Knopf Canada/Haymarket, 2022)
- A Short History of the Blockade: Giant Beavers, Diplomacy & Regeneration in Nishnaabewin (University of Alberta Press, 2021)
- Danser sur les dos de notre Tortue (Varia, 2018)
- As We Have Always Done: Indigenous Freedom Through Radical Resistance (University of Minnesota Press, 2017)
- Dancing On Our Turtle's Back: Stories of Nishnaabeg Re-Creation, Resurgence, and a New Emergence (Arbeiter Ring Publishing, 2011)
- Theory of Water: Nishnaabe Maps to the Times Ahead (Haymarket Books, 2025)

Fiction

- Noopiming: The Cure for White Ladies (House of Anansi, 2020; University of Minnesota Press, 2021)
- Noopiming, Remède pour guérir de la blancheur (Mémoire d'encrier, 2021)
- On se perd toujours par accident (Mémoire d'encrier, 2020)
- Cartographie de l'amour décolonial (Mémoire d'encrier, 2018)
- This Accident of Being Lost: Songs and Stories (House of Anansi, 2017)
- Islands of Decolonial Love (ARP Books, 2013)
- The Gift is in the Making (Portage and Main Press, 2013)

Edited books

- Lighting the Eighth Fire (2008)
- This is an Honour Song (edited with Kiera Ladner) (2010)
- The Winter We Danced: Voice from the Past, the Future and the Idle No More Movement (edited with Kino-nda- niimi Collective) (2014)

=== Discography ===
==== Albums ====
- Theory of Ice (You've Changed Records, 2021)
- Noopiming Sessions (Gizhiiwe Records, 2020)
- f(l)ight (2016)
- Islands of Decolonial Love (2013)

=== Films and videos ===
- Viscosity (dir. Sandra Brewster, 2021)
- Solidification (dir. Sammy Chien & Chimerik Collective, 2020)
- Biidaaban (The Dawn Comes) (dir. Amanda Strong, 2018)
- The Oldest Tree in the World (dir. Cara Mumford, 2017)
- How to Steal A Canoe (dir. Amanda Strong, 2016)
- Under Your Always Light (dir. Elle-Máijá Tailfeathers, 2016)
- Leaks (dir. Cara Mumford, 2013)
