= Contemporary Political Theory =

Academic journal

- Discipline: Political theory, political philosophy
- Language: English
- Edited by: Terrell Carver, Samuel A. Chambers

Publication details
- History: 2002-present
- Publisher: Palgrave Macmillan
- Open access: Hybrid
- Impact factor: 1.7 (2025)

Standard abbreviations
- ISO 4: Contemp. Political Theory

Indexing
- ISSN: 1470-8914 (print); 1476-9336 (web)

Links
- Journal homepage

Contemporary Political Theory is a peer-reviewed academic journal covering political theory and philosophy published by Palgrave Macmillan. The editors-in-chief are Terrell Carver (University of Bristol) and Samuel A. Chambers (Johns Hopkins University).

== Abstracting and indexing ==
The journal is abstracted and indexed in:

- Social Sciences Citation Index
- Current Contents Social And Behavioral Sciences
- Essential Science Indicators
- Scopus

The journal's 2025 impact factor was 1.7.
