= Taiaiake Alfred =

Canadian writer

Gerald Taiaiake Alfred is an author, educator and activist, born in Montreal, Quebec, in 1964 and raised in the community of Kahnawà:ke. Alfred is an internationally recognized Kanien’kehá:ka scholar.

== Early life and education ==
Alfred grew up in the Mohawk community of Kahnawà:ke and graduated from Loyola High School in Montreal. After high school, he served in the U.S. Marine Corps for three years until 1985. He then received a Bachelor of Arts in History from Concordia University, a Master of Arts and Ph.D. from Cornell University.

== Career ==
Alfred was a professor of political science at Concordia University and later the founding director of the University of Victoria’s Indigenous Governance Program (serving from 1999 until 2015) and was awarded a Canada Research Chair 2003–2007, in addition to a National Aboriginal Achievement Award in education in 2006. In 2019 he resigned from the University of Victoria in response to a conflict with the university’s administration over pedagogical methods and criticism of his approach to decolonizing education.

In 2019, Alfred took leadership of the Kahnawà:ke Governance Project and began working as an independent consultant offering strategic advice to First Nations, notably in the area of the cultural aspect of environmental impact assessment.

In 2023, he released his fourth book, titled Its All About the Land: Collected Talks and Interviews on Indigenous Resurgence, published by the University of Toronto Press.

== Bibliography ==
- Heeding the Voices of our Ancestors: Kahnawake Mohawk Politics and the Rise of Native Nationalism, Oxford University Press (Canada), 1995.
- Peace, Power, Righteousness: an Indigenous manifesto, Oxford University Press (Canada), 1999.
- Wasáse: Indigenous Pathways of Action and Freedom, Peterborough: Broadview Press, 2005.
- Peace, Power, Righteousness: an Indigenous manifesto, 2nd Ed., Oxford University Press (Canada), 2009.
- It’s All about the Land: Collected Talks and Interviews on Indigenous Resurgence, University of Toronto Press, 2023.
