= Dechinta Centre for Research and Learning =

Coordinates: 62°09′58.86″N 112°40′59.64″W

The Dechinta Centre for Research & Learning is an Indigenous-led educational establishment in Yellowknife, Canada. It is the only land-based accredited university program in the world.

== Activities ==
Dechinta is Indigenous-led, and serves Indigenous peoples in Canada at its location near Blachford Lake in Yellowknife, Canada. It is the only land-based accredited university program in the world and has been providing educational services for over ten years.

Dechinta develops land-based culturally immersive programming in collaboration with local Indigenous communities. Programming includes instruction from Elders, land-based practitioners, Knowledge Holders and Indigenous academics in order to prepare students for leadership roles in their communities with a focus on land-based practices, governance, self-determination, gender and artistic practice.

Dechinta delivers culturally-relevant educational programming that prioritizes reconnection, skill-building, knowledge and practice with the land. Dechinta prioritizes the importance of being together on the land, learning with the land, and having a strong relationship to the land. Dechinta directly fulfils many of the Truth and Reconciliation Commission's education recommendations, including closing the education gap by delivering culturally appropriate and community developed curricula, enabling parent and community responsibility and control, and respecting and honouring Indigenous government relationships.

Dechinta's programming includes services such as free integrated childcare, on-site counselling, and health services. Dechinta's programs aim to be inclusive to families, women, girls, and gender non-conforming, queer, and two-spirit folks in order to provide access to Indigenous cultures, languages, and identities.

Dechinta is currently committed to expanding their partnerships and developing programming in different regions in the north. Dechinta has on-going partnerships with several academic institutions including the University of British Columbia, the University of Alberta, Collège Nordique Francophone and Aurora College.

In 2020, Dechinta received funding from the Mastercard Foundation to address gaps in training, education, and research during the COVID-19 pandemic.
