= Governor General's Award for English-language young people's literature - illustrated books =

Canadian literary award

The Governor General's Award for English-language young people's literature - illustrated books is a Canadian literary award presented annually to a Canadian writer and illustrator, or an individual serving as both, for an illustrated book in English. It is one of four awards recognizing English- and French-language writing and illustration in young people's literature. The Governor General's Awards program is administered by the Canada Council.

In name, this award is part of the Governor General's Award program only from 1987 but the four children's literature awards were established in 1975 under a Canada Council name. In the event, the "Canada Council" and "Governor General's" awards have recognized illustrated children's books every year from 1978. The category was known as "Children's Literature - Illustration" until 2015. In 2016, it became part of the Young People's Literature categories, under the name "Young People's Literature - Illustrated Books."

== Canada Council Children's Literature Prize ==
In 1975 the Canada Council established four annual prizes of $5000 for the year's best English- and French-language children's books by Canadian writers and illustrators. Those "Canada Council Children's Literature Prizes" were continued under the "Governor General's Awards" rubric from 1987, and continue today. Among them the English-language illustration prize was awarded every year from 1978.

- 1978: Ann Blades, A Salmon for Simon, written by Betty Waterton
- 1979: László Gál, The Twelve Dancing Princesses, retold by Janet Lunn
- 1980: Elizabeth Cleaver, Petrouchka: adapted from Igor Stravinsky and Alexandre Benois, Petrushka retold by Cleaver
- 1981: Heather Woodall, Ytek and the Arctic Orchid: an Inuit legend, by Garnet Hewitt
- 1982: Vlasta van Kampen, ABC/123: The Canadian Alphabet and Counting Book
- 1983: László Gál, The Little Mermaid, retold by Margaret Crawford Maloney
- 1984: Marie-Louise Gay, Lizzy's Lion, by Dennis Lee
- 1985: Terry Gallagher, Murdo's Story, by Murdo Scribe
- 1986: Barbara Reid, Have You Seen Birds?, by Joanne Oppenheim

Three of these winning English-language illustrators also won the annual Canadian Library Association award for children's book illustration, recognizing the same books. Their CLA Amelia Frances Howard-Gibbon Illustrator's Awards are dated one year later: Blades 1979, Gál 1980, and Woodall 1982. The Howard-Gibbon award was inaugurated in 1971 for 1970 publications.

Six illustrators listed below, winners of the English-language illustration award under the "Governor General's" name, also won the CLA award for the same book: Gay 1988, LaFave 1989, Morin 1991, Lightburn 1992, Reid 1998, and Denton 1999.

== Children's literature (illustration) ==
=== 1980s ===
Award winners and finalists, 1987-1989
Year	Illustrator	Author	Title	Result	Ref.
1987	Marie-Louise Gay		Rainy Day Magic	Winner	
1987	John Bianchi	Terence Dickinson	Exploring the Night Sky	Finalist	
1987	László Gál	Robert D. San Souci	The Enchanted Tapestry	Finalist	
1987	Shawn Steffler	John Steffler	Flights of Magic	Finalist	
1988	Kim LaFave	Janet Lunn	Amos's Sweater	Winner	
1988	Marie-Louise Gay		Angel and the Polar Bear	Finalist	
1988	Jillian Hulme Gilliland	Mary Alice Downie	How the Devil Got His Cat	Finalist	
1988	Dayal Kaur Khalsa	Dayal Kaur Khalsa	Sleepers	Finalist	
1988	Jan Thornhill		The Wildlife ABC	Finalist	
1989	Robin Muller		The Magic Paintbrush	Winner	
1989	Michèle Lemieux	Joanna Cole	A Gift from Saint Francis	Finalist	
1989	Jan Thornhill		The Wildlife 123	Finalist	

=== 1990s ===
Award winners and finalists, 1990-1999
Year	Illustrator	Author	Title	Result	Ref.
1990	Tololwa M. Mollel	Paul Morin	The Orphan Boy	Winner	
1990	Warabé Aska		Seasons	Finalist	
1990	Frances Tyrrell		The Huron Carol	Finalist	
1991	Joanne Fitzgerald	Teddy Jam	Doctor Kiss Says Yes	Winner	
1991	Kady MacDonald Denton	P. K. Page	The Travelling Musicians	Finalist	
1991	Michèle Lemieux	Michèle Lemieux	Peter and the Wolf	Finalist	
1991	Gilles Pelletier	Roch Carrier	A Happy New Year's Day	Finalist	
1991	Jacquelinne White		Coyote Winter	Finalist	
1992	Ron Lightburn	Sheryl McFarlane	Waiting for the Whales	Winner	
1992	Eric Beddows	Tim Wynne-Jones	Zoom Upstream	Finalist	
1992	Suzanne Duranceau	Robin Muller	Hickory, Dickory, Dock	Finalist	
1992	Maryann Kovalski	Rhea Tregebov	The Big Storm	Finalist	
1992	Mireille Levert	Sharon Jennings	When Jeremiah Found Mrs. Ming	Finalist	
1993	Mireille Levert	Sharon Jennings	Sleep Tight, Mrs. Ming	Winner	
1993	Scott Cameron	Barbara Nichol	Beethoven Lives Upstairs	Finalist	
1993	Marc Mongeau	Sheree Fitch	There Were Monkeys in My Kitchen!	Finalist	
1993	Russ Willms	Berny Lucas	Brewster Rooster	Finalist	
1993	Leo Yerxa		Last Leaf First Snowflake to Fall	Finalist	
1994	Murray Kimber	Jim McGugan	Josepha: A Prairie Boy's Story	Winner	
1994	Marie Lafrance	Richardo Keens-Douglas	La Diablesse and the Baby	Finalist	
1994	Michèle Lemieux	Edward Lear	There Was An Old Man...: A Collection of Limericks	Finalist	
1994	Laurie McGaw	Daisy Corning Stone Spedden	Polar, the Titanic Bear	Finalist	
1994	Martin Springett	Richard Thompson	Who	Finalist	
1995	Ludmila Zeman		The Last Quest of Gilgamesh	Winner	
1995	Warabé Aska	David Day	Aska's Sea Creatures	Finalist	
1995	Geoff Butler		The Killick: A Newfoundland Story	Finalist	
1995	Gary Clement		Just Stay Put	Finalist	
1995	Frances Tyrrell		Woodland Christmas	Finalist	
1996	Eric Beddows	Pam Conrad	The Rooster's Gift	Winner	
1996	Alan and Lea Daniel	Aubrey Davis	Sody Salleratus	Finalist	
1996	Wang Kui	Deborah Froese	The Wise Washerman – A Folktale from Burma	Finalist	
1996	Johnny Wales	Jean Little	Gruntle Piggle Takes Off	Finalist	
1996	Werner Zimmermann	Julie Lawson	Whatever You Do, Don't Go Near That Canoe!	Finalist	
1997	Barbara Reid		The Party	Winner	
1997	Blair Drawson		Flying Dimitri	Finalist	
1997	Marie-Louise Gay	Wilhelm Grimm	Rumpelstiltskin	Finalist	
1997	Robin Muller		The Angel Tree	Finalist	
1997	Ludmila Zeman		The First Red Maple Leaf	Finalist	
1998	Kady MacDonald Denton		A Child's Treasury of Nursery Rhymes	Winner	
1998	Victor Bosson	Laura Langston	The Fox's Kettle	Finalist	
1998	Harvey Chan	Celia Barker Lottridge	Music for the Tsar of the Sea	Finalist	
1998	Zhong-Yang Huang	David Bouchard	The Great Race	Finalist	
1998	Stéphane Jorisch	Barrie Baker	The Village of a Hundred Smiles and Other Stories	Finalist	
1999	Gary Clement		The Great Poochini	Winner	
1999	Rose Cowles	Jean Little	I Know an Old Laddie	Finalist	
1999	Zhong-Yang Huang	David Bouchard	Dragon New Year	Finalist	
1999	Ludmila Zeman		Sindbad: from the Tales of the Thousand and One Nights	Finalist	
1999	Werner Zimmermann	Heather Kellerhals-Stewart	Brave Highland Heart	Finalist	

=== 2000s ===
Award winners and finalists, 2000-2009
Year	Illustrator	Author	Title	Result	Ref.
2000	Marie-Louise Gay	Don Gillmor	Yuck, A Love Story	Winner	
2000	Nelly and Ernst Hofer	Ken Setterington	The Snow Queen	Finalist	
2000	Marthe Jocelyn		Hannah's Collections	Finalist	
2000	Regolo Ricci	Cary Fagan	The Market Wedding	Finalist	
2000	Cybèle Young	Jan Andrews	Pa's Harvest	Finalist	
2001	Mireille Levert		An Island in the Soup	Winner	
2001	Harvey Chan	Annette LeBox	Wild Bog Tea	Finalist	
2001	Murray Kimber	Michael Bedard	The Wolf of Gubbio	Finalist	
2001	Kim LaFave	Maggee Spicer	We'll All Go Sailing	Finalist	
2001	Cindy Revell	Pete Marlowe	Mallory and the Power Boy	Finalist	
2002	Wallace Edwards		Alphabeasts	Winner	
2002	Brian Deines	Tomson Highway	Dragonfly Kites / Kíweegínapíseek	Finalist	
2002	Marie-Louise Gay		Stella, Fairy of the Forest	Finalist	
2002	Rogé	Valerie Coulman	When Pigs Fly	Finalist	
2002	Janie Jaehyun Park		The Tiger and the Dried Persimmon	Finalist	
2003	Allen Sapp	David Bouchard	The Song Within My Heart	Winner	
2003	Nicolas Debon		Four Pictures by Emily Carr	Finalist	
2003	Rob Gonsalves	Sarah L. Thomson	Imagine a Night	Finalist	
2003	Barbara Reid		The Subway Mouse	Finalist	
2003	Ludmila Zeman		Sindbad's Secret: From the Tales of the Thousand and One Nights	Finalist	
2004	Stéphane Jorisch	Lewis Carroll	Jabberwocky	Winner	
2004	Nicolas Debon	Jean E. Pendziwol	Dawn Watch	Finalist	
2004	Marie-Louise Gay		Stella, Princess of the Sky	Finalist	
2004	Kim LaFave	Dorothy Joan Harris	A Very Unusual Dog	Finalist	
2004	Barbara Reid	Kenneth Oppel	Peg and the Yeti	Finalist	
2005	Rob Gonsalves	Sarah L. Thomson	Imagine a Day	Winner	
2005	Kyrsten Brooker	Eileen Spinelli	City Angel	Finalist	
2005	Wallace Edwards	Kenyon Cox	Mixed Beasts	Finalist	
2005	Murray Kimber	Alfred Noyes	The Highwayman	Finalist	
2005	Rajka Kupesic	Louis Hémon	Maria Chapdelaine	Finalist	
2006	Leo Yerxa		Ancient Thunder	Winner	
2006	Eugenie Fernandes	Dionne Brand	Earth Magic	Finalist	
2006	Annouchka Gravel Galouchko and Stéphan Daigle	Veronika Martenova Charles	The Birdman	Finalist	
2006	Jon Morse	Ernest Lawrence Thayer	Casey at the Bat	Finalist	
2006	Maxwell Newhouse		Let's Go for a Ride	Finalist	
2007	Duncan Weller		The Boy from the Sun	Winner	
2007	Wallace Edwards		The Painted Circus	Finalist	
2007	Joanne Fitzgerald	Phoebe Gilman	The Blue Hippopotamus	Finalist	
2007	Jirina Marton	Jean E. Pendziwol	Marja's Skis	Finalist	
2007	Dušan Petričić	Cary Fagan	My New Shirt	Finalist	
2008	Stéphane Jorisch	Edward Lear	The Owl and the Pussycat	Winner	
2008	Isabelle Arseneault	Emily Dickinson	My Letter to the World and Other Poems	Finalist	
2008	Josée Bisaillon	Martin Wald	The Emperor's Second Hand Clothes	Finalist	
2008	Matt James	Pamela Porter	Yellow Moon, Apple Moon	Finalist	
2008	Kim LaFave	Nicola I. Campbell	Shin-chi's Canoe	Finalist	
2009	Jirina Marton	Janet Russell	Bella's Tree	Winner	
2009	Rachel Berman	Tim Beiser	Bradley McGogg, the Very Fine Frog	Finalist	
2009	Irene Luxbacher	Andrew Larsen	The Imaginary Garden	Finalist	
2009	Luc Melanson	Olivier Ka	My Great Big Mamma	Finalist	
2009	Ningiukulu Teevee		Alego	Finalist	

=== 2010s ===
Award winners and finalists, 2010-2019
Year	Illustrator	Author	Title	Result	Ref.
2010	Jon Klassen	Caroline Stutson	Cats' Night Out	Winner	
2010	Kristin Bridgeman	P. K. Page	Uirapuru	Finalist	
2010	Julie Flett		Owls See Clearly at Night	Finalist	
2010	Matt James	Laurel Croza	I Know Here	Finalist	
2010	Renata Liwska	Deborah Underwood	The Quiet Book	Finalist	
2011	Cybèle Young		Ten Birds	Winner	
2011	Isabelle Arsenault	Maxine Trottier	Migrant	Finalist	
2011	Kim LaFave	Gary Kent	Fishing with Gubby	Finalist	
2011	Renata Liwska		Red Wagon	Finalist	
2011	Frank Viva		Along a Long Road	Finalist	
2012	Isabelle Arsenault	Kyo Maclear	Virginia Wolf	Winner	
2012	Renné Benoit	Maggie de Vries	Big City Bees	Finalist	
2012	Jon Klassen	Ted Kooser	House Held Up by Trees	Finalist	
2012	David Parkins	Monica Kulling	In the Bag! Margaret Knight Wraps It Up	Finalist	
2012	Barbara Reid		Picture a Tree	Finalist	
2013	Matt James	Stan Rogers	Northwest Passage	Winner	
2013	Rachel Berman	Tim Beiser	Miss Mousie's Blind Date	Finalist	
2013	Gary Clement	Cary Fagan	Oy, Feh, So?	Finalist	
2013	Jon Klassen	Lemony Snicket	The Dark	Finalist	
2013	Julie Morstad		How To	Finalist	
2014	Jillian Tamaki	Mariko Tamaki	This One Summer	Winner	
2014	Marie-Louise Gay		Any Questions?	Finalist	
2014	Qin Leng	Chieri Uegaki	Hana Hashimoto, Sixth Violin	Finalist	
2014	Renata Liwska	Nina Laden	Once Upon a Memory	Finalist	
2014	Julie Morstad	Kyo Maclear	Julia, Child	Finalist	
2015	Sydney Smith	JonArno Lawson	Sidewalk Flowers	Winner	
2015	Darka Erdelji	Andy Jones	Jack, the King of Ashes	Finalist	
2015	Marion Arbona	Kyo Maclear	The Good Little Book	Finalist	
2015	John Martz		A Cat Named Tim and Other Stories	Finalist	
2015	Mélanie Watt		Bug in a Vacuum	Finalist	
2016	Kellen Hatanaka	Jon-Erik Lappano	Tokyo Digs a Garden	Winner	
2016	Sydney Smith	Jo Ellen Bogart	The White Cat and the Monk	Finalist	
2016	Lucy Ruth Cummins		A Hungry Lion or a Dwindling Assortment of Animals	Finalist	
2016	Pierre Pratt	Mireille Messier	The Branch	Finalist	
2016	Esmé Shapiro		Ooko	Finalist	
2017	Julie Flett	David Robertson	When We Were Alone	Winner	
2017	Marie-Louise Gay		Short Stories for Little Monsters	Finalist	
2017	Matt James	Paul Harbridge	When the Moon Comes	Finalist	
2017	Sydney Smith	Joanne Schwartz	Town Is By the Sea	Finalist	
2017	Pierre Pratt	Jan Thornhill	The Tragic Tale of the Great Auk	Finalist	
2018	Jillian Tamaki		They Say Blue	Winner	
2018	The Fan Brothers		Ocean Meets Sky	Finalist	
2018	Eva Campbell	Shauntay Grant	Africville	Finalist	
2018	Joe Morse	Wab Kinew	Go Show the World: A Celebration of Indigenous Heroes	Finalist	
2018	Werner Zimmermann		At the Pond	Finalist	
2019	Sydney Smith		Small in the City	Winner	
2019	Isabelle Arsenault		Albert's Quiet Quest	Finalist	
2019	Dena Seiferling	Cary Fagan	King Mouse	Finalist	
2019	Julie Flett		Birdsong	Finalist	
2019	John Martz	Nicola Winstanley	How to Give Your Cat a Bath in Five Easy Steps	Finalist	

=== 2020s ===
Award winners and finalists, 2020-present
Year	Illustrator	Author	Title	Result	Ref.
2020	The Fan Brothers		The Barnabus Project	Winner	
2020	Frank Viva	Naseem Hrab	Weekend Dad	Finalist	
2020	Sydney Smith	Jordan Scott	I Talk Like a River	Finalist	
2020	Jillian Tamaki		Our Little Kitchen	Finalist	
2020	Maya McKibbin	Rebecca Thomas	Swift Fox All Along	Finalist	
2021	Julie Flett	David A. Robertson	On the Trapline	Winner	
2021	Josée Bisaillon	Paul Harbridge	Out Into the Big Wide Lake	Finalist	
2021	Joshua Mangeshig Pawis-Steckley	Brittany Luby	Mii maanda ezhi-gkendmaanh / This Is How I Know	Finalist	
2021	Gabrielle Grimard	Bahram Rahman	The Library Bus	Finalist	
2021	Todd Stewart		The Wind and the Trees	Finalist	
2022	Nahid Kazemi	Naseem Hrab	The Sour Cherry Tree	Winner	
2022	Matthew Forsythe		Mina	Finalist	
2022	Alyssa Koski	Doris George and Don K. Philpot	kā-āciwīkicik / The Move	Finalist	
2022	Gracey Zhang	Kyo Maclear	The Big Bath House	Finalist	
2022	Julie Morstad		Time Is a Flower	Finalist	
2023	Jack Wong		When You Can Swim	Winner	
2023	Monica Arnaldo		Mr. S	Finalist	
2023	Jon Klassen		The Skull	Finalist	
2023	Julie Flett	Buffy Sainte-Marie	Still This Love Goes On	Finalist	
2023	Nancy Vo		Boobies	Finalist	
2024	Todd Stewart	Jean E. Pendziwol	Skating Wild on an Inland Sea	Winner	
2024	Matt James	Danielle Daniel	I'm Afraid, Said the Leaf	Finalist	
2024	Adam de Souza		The Gulf	Finalist	
2024	Thao Lam		One Giant Leap	Finalist	
2024	Sydney Smith		Do You Remember?	Finalist	
2025	Delreé Dumont	Tonya Simpson	This Land Is a Lullaby	Winner	
2025	Guojing		Oasis	Finalist	
2025	Sid Sharp		Bog Myrtle	Finalist	
2025	Brooke Kerrigan	Kathy Stinson	The Rock and the Butterfly	Finalist	
2025	Cee Pootoogook	Tanya Tagaq	It Bears Repeating	Finalist	
2026	Matthew Forsythe		Aggie and the Ghost	Winner	
2026	Andrew Larsen, Bells Larsen	Tallulah Fontaine	Call Me Gray	Finalist	
2026	José Lourenço	James Braithwaite	Billie Builds a Robocorn	Finalist	
2026	Kyo Maclear	Julie Morstad	A Door Is to Open	Finalist	
2026	Todd Stewart		Little Moments in a Big Universe	Finalist	

== See also ==
- Governor General's Award for English-language young people's literature - text
- Governor General's Award for French-language young people's literature - illustrated books
- Governor General's Award for French-language young people's literature - text
