= Elizabeth Mrazik-Cleaver Canadian Picture Book Award =

Annual literary award for children's book illustrators

The Elizabeth Mrazik-Cleaver Canadian Picture Book Award is an annual literary award for children's picture illustrators. It was established in 1985 following the death of Elizabeth Mrazik-Cleaver, one of Canada's pre-eminent book illustrators. In her will, Cleaver left a fund of $10,000 for an award to be given annually in recognition of outstanding artistic talent in a Canadian picture book. The recipient receives a cheque for $1,000, and a certificate.

The Cleaver Award is administered by a committee of three members of the Canadian section of the International Board on Books for Young People IBBY Canada. The recipient is a Canadian illustrator of a picture book published in Canada in English or French during the previous calendar year.

== Honorees ==
=== 1980s–1999 ===
Elizabeth Mrazik-Cleaver Award winners
Year	Illustrator	Title	Result
1986	Ann Blades	By The Sea: An Alphabet Book	Winner
1987	Barbara Reid	Have You Seen Birds?	Winner
1988	Stéphane Poulin	Can You Catch Josephine?	Winner
1989	Eric Beddows	Night Cars	Winner
1990	Ian Wallace	The Name of the Tree	Winner
1991	Paul Morin	The Orphan Boy	Winner
1992	Ron Lightburn	Waiting for the Whales	Winner
1993	Barbara Reid	Two By Two	Winner
1994	Leo Yerxa	Last Leaf, First Snowflake To Fall	Winner
1995	Murray Kimber	Josepha: A Prairie Boy's Story	Winner
1996	Janet Wilson	Selina and The Bear Paw Quilt	Winner
1997	Harvey Chan	Ghost Train	Winner
1998	Pascal Mileli	Rainbow Bay	Winner
1999	Kady MacDonald Denton	A Child's Treasury of Nursery Rhymes	Winner

=== 2000–present ===
Elizabeth Mrazik-Cleaver Award winners
Year	Illustrator	Author	Title	Result	Ref.
2000	Michèle Lemieux		Stormy Night	Winner	
2001	Marie-Louise Gay		Stella, Queen of the Snow	Winner	
2002	Janie Jaehyun Park		The Tiger and the Dried Persimmon	Winner	
2003	Pierre Pratt		Where's Pup?	Winner	
2004	Stéphane Poulin		Un chant de Noël	Winner	
2005	Geneviève Côté		The Lady of Shalott	Winner	
2006	Kady MacDonald Denton		Snow	Winner	
2007	Stéphane Jorisch		The Owl and the Pussycat	Winner	
2008	Christine Delezenne		La Clé	Winner	
2009	Oleg Lipchenko		Alice's Adventures in Wonderland	Winner	
2010	Julie Flett		Lii Yiiboo Nayaapiwak lii Swer: L’Alfabet di Michif / Owls See Clearly at Night: A Michif Alphabet	Winner	
2011	Cybèle Young		A Few Blocks	Winner	
2012	Isabelle Arsenault		Virginia Wolf	Winner	
2013	Julie Morstad		How To	Winner	
2014	Pierre Pratt		Stop, Thief!	Winner	
2015	Sydney Smith		Sidewalk Flowers	Winner	
2016	Isabelle Arsenault		Louis parmi les spectres	Winner	
2017	Julie Kraulis	Julie Kraulis	A Pattern for Pepper	Winner	
2017	Sydney Smith	Joanne Schwartz	Town is by the Sea	Honour	
2017	Matt James	Paul Harbridge	When the Moon Comes	Honour	
2017	Geneviève Després	Marie-Francine Hébert	Dépareillés	Shortlist	
2017	Gabrielle Grimard	Melanie Florence	Stolen Words	Shortlist	
2018	Julie Morstad	Kyo Maclear	Bloom	Winner	
2018	Eva Campbell	Shauntay Grant	Africville	Honour	
2018	Irene Luxbacher	Irene Luxbacher	Deep Underwater	Honour	
2018	Amanda Strong	Dallas Hunt	Awâsis and the World-Famous Bannock	Finalist	
2018	Geraldo Valério	Geraldo Valério	Blue Rider	Finalist	
2018	Matt James	Matt James	The Funeral	Finalist	
2018	Marie-Louise Gay	Marie-Louise Gay	Mustafa	Finalist	
2018	Elly MacKay	Elly MacKay	Red Sky at Night	Finalist	
2018	Marianne Ferrer	Marianne Ferrer and Valérie Picard	Toucania	Finalist	
2018	Thao Lam	Thao Lam	Wallpaper	Finalist	
2019	Rachel Wada	Heather Smith	The Phone Booth in Mr. Hirota's Garden	Winner	
2019	Dena Seiferling	Cary Fagan	King Mouse	Honour	
2019	Sydney Smith	Sydney Smith	Small in the City	Honour	
2019	Josée Bisaillon	Jan Coates	Dancing with Daisy	Finalist	
2019	Gary Clement	James Gladstone	My Winter City	Finalist	
2019	Geneviève Després	Stéphanie Deslauriers	Laurent, c’est moi!	Finalist	
2019	Emma FitzGerald	Rita Wilson	A Pocket of Time: The Poetic Childhood of Elizabeth Bishop	Finalist	
2019	Julie Flett	Julie Flett	Birdsong	Finalist	
2019	Julie Morstad	Kyo Maclear	It Began With a Page: How Gyo Fujikawa Drew the Way	Finalist	
2019	François Thisdale	Christiane Duchesne	Bon Voyage, Mister Rodriguez	Finalist	
2020	Marie-Louise Gay	Marie-Louise Gay	The Three Brothers	Winner	
2020	Thao Lam	Thao Lam	The Paper Boat	Honour	
2020	Geraldo Valério	Geraldo Valério	At The Pond	Honour	
2020	Marion Arbona	Marion Arbona	Window	Finalist	
2020	Nathalie Dion	Valérie Fontaine	Le grand méchant loup dans ma maison	Finalist	
2020	The Fan Brothers	The Fan Brothers	The Barnabus Project	Finalist	
2020	Nahid Kazemi	Joanne Schwartz	The Old Woman	Finalist	
2020	Marie Lafrance	Kathy Stinson	The Lady with the Books	Finalist	
2020	Miki Sato	Deborah Kerbel	Snow Days	Finalist	
2020	Geraldo Valério	Geraldo Valério	The Egg	Finalist	
2021	Gérard DuBois	Mario Brassard	À qui appartiennent les nuages?	Winner	
2021	Dena Seiferling	Cary Fagan	Bear Wants To Sing	Finalist	
2021	Marie Lafrance	Sara O'Leary	Gemma and the Giant Girl	Finalist	
2021	Bill Pechet	Bill Richardson	Hare B&B	Finalist	
2021	Julie Rocheleau	Hugo Léger	Les devoirs d’Edmond	Finalist	
2021	Isabelle Arsenault	Isabelle Arsenault	Maya's Big Scene	Finalist	
2021	Julie Flett	David A. Robertson	On the Trapline	Finalist	
2021	Eve Patenaude	Simon Boulerice	Papier Bulle	Finalist	
2021	Julie Morstad	Julie Morstad	Time is a Flower	Finalist	
2021	Julie Flett	Julie Flett	We All Play	Finalist	
2022	Dena Seiferling		Night Lunch	Winner	
2022	Nathalie Dion	Kyo Maclear	Kumo: the Bashful Cloud	Honour	
2022	The Fan Brothers	The Fan Brothers	Lizzy and the Cloud	Honour	
2023	Todd Stewart	Jean E. Pendziwol	Skating Wild on an Inland Sea	Winner	
2023	Joshua Mangeshig Pawis-Steckley	Brittany Luby	Mnoomin maan’gowing / The Gift of Mnoomin	Honour	
2023	Lauren Soloy	Kathy Stinson	A Tulip in Winter: A Story About Folk Artist Maud Lewis	Honour	
2024	Isabella Fassler	Dorson Plourde	Garbage Gulls	Winner	
2024	Qin Leng	Catherine Trudeau	La Tasse de Gilles	Honour	
2024	Lauren Soloy		Tove and the Island with No Address	Honour	
