= Amelia Frances Howard-Gibbon Illustrator's Award =

Canadian children's literature award (1971–2016)

- Awarded for: an outstanding illustrator of a new Canadian children's book
- Country: Canada
- Presented by: Canadian Library Association/Association canadienne des bibliothèques
- First award: 1971
- Final award: 2016

The Amelia Frances Howard-Gibbon Illustrator's Award was presented annually by the Canadian Library Association/Association canadienne des bibliothèques (CLA) to an outstanding illustrator of a new Canadian children's book. The book must be "suitable for children up to and including age 12" and its writing "must be worthy of the book's illustrations." The illustrator must be a citizen or permanent resident. The prize is a plaque and $1000 presented at the CLA annual conference. The medal commemorates and the award is dedicated to schoolteacher and artist Amelia Frances Howard-Gibbon who taught academics as well as art to Ontario schoolchildren in the 1860s and early 1870s. Her best-known work An Illustrated Comic Alphabet was published in 1966 by Henry Z. Walck in New York City and Oxford University Press in Toronto.

== Winners ==
The award has been presented to one illustrator for one book every year from 1971.

Below, the author column indicates if the author is distinct from the original and/or a retelling of a text. Otherwise the text was written by the illustrator or was not original ("anthology").

Amelia Frances Howard-Gibbon Illustrator's Award winners
Year	Illustrator	Author	Title	Ref.
1971	Elizabeth Mrazik-Cleaver	Anthology	The Wind Has Wings: Poems from Canada	
1972	Shizuye Takashima		A Child in Prison Camp	
1973	Jacques de Roussan		Au-Delà du Soleil / Beyond the Sun (bilingual)	
1974	William Kurelek		A Prairie Boy's Winter	
1975	Carlo Italiano		The Sleighs of My Childhood	
1976	William Kurelek		A Prairie Boy's Summer	
1977	Pam Hall	Al Pittman	Down by Jim Long's Stage: Rhymes for Children and Young Fish	
1978	Elizabeth Mrazik-Cleaver	William Toye (retelling)	The Loon's Necklace	
1979	Ann Blades	Betty Waterton	A Salmon for Simon	
1980	László Gál	Janet Lunn (retelling)	The Twelve Dancing Princesses	
1981	Douglas Tait	Christie Harris	The Trouble with Princesses	
1982	Heather Woodall	Garnet Hewitt	Ytek and the Arctic Orchid: an Inuit Legend	
1983	Lindee Climo		Chester's Barn	
1984	Ken Nutt	Tim Wynne-Jones	Zoom at Sea	
1985	Ian Wallace		Chin Chiang and the Dragon's Dance	
1986	Ken Nutt	Tim Wynne-Jones	Zoom Away	
1987	Marie-Louise Gay		Moonbeam on a Cat's Ear	
1988	Marie-Louise Gay		Rainy Day Magic	
1989	Kim LaFave	Janet Lunn	Amos's Sweater	
1990	Kady MacDonald Denton	Anthology	'Til All the Stars Have Fallen: Canadian Poems for Children	
1991	Paul Morin	Tololwa M. Mollel	The Orphan Boy	
1992	Ron Lightburn	Sheryl McFarlane	Waiting for the Whales	
1993	Paul Morin	Julie Lawson	The Dragon's Pearl	
1994	Leo Yerxa		Last Leaf, First Snowflake to Fall	
1995	Barbara Reid	Jo Ellen Bogart	Gifts	
1996	Karen Reczuch	Ainslie Manson	Just Like New	
1997	Harvey Chan	Paul Yee	Ghost Train	
1998	Barbara Reid		The Party	
1999	Kady MacDonald Denton	Anthology	A Child's Treasury of Nursery Rhymes	
2000	Zhong-Yang Huang	Dave Bouchard	The Dragon New Year: A Chinese Legend	
2001	Laura Fernandez and Rick Jacobson	Marilynn Reynolds	The Magnificent Piano Recital	
2002	Frances Wolfe		Where I Live	
2003	Pascal Milelli	Susan Vande Griek	The Art Room	
2004	Bill Slavin	Linda Bailey	Stanley's Party	
2005	Wallace Edwards		Monkey Business	
2006	Leslie Elizabeth Watts		The Baabaasheep Quartet	
2007	Mélanie Watt		Scaredy Squirrel	
2008	Mélanie Watt		Chester	
2009	Dušan Petričić	Hazel Hutchins and Gail Hebert	Mattland	
2010	Barbara Reid		Perfect Snow	
2011	Marie-Louise Gay		Roslyn Rutabaga and the Biggest Hole on Earth!	
2012	Matthew Forsythe	Annika Dunklee	My Name is Elizabeth	
2013	Soyeon Kim	Elin Kelsey	You are Stardust	
2014	Jon Klassen	Lemony Snicket	The Dark	
2015	Marie-Louise Gay		Any Questions?	
2016	Sydney Smith	JonArno Lawson	Sidewalk Flowers	

== Repeat winners ==
Marie-Louise Gay has won the Illustrator's Award four times from 1987, most recently in 2015. Several others have won it twice.

== Winners of multiple awards ==
Nine books won both this CLA Illustrator's Award and the Governor General's Award for English-language children's illustration (or Canada Council Children's Literature Prize before 1987). The illustrators and CLA award dates were Blades 1979, Gál 1980, Woodall 1982, (now under the "Governor General's Awards" name) Gay 1988, LaFave 1989, Morin 1991, Lightburn 1992, Reid 1998, and Denton 1999.

== See also ==
- CLA Book of the Year for Children Award
- ALA Caldecott Medal
- British Greenaway Medal
