= László Gál =

Canadian children's book illustrator (born 1933)

- Born: 1933 (age 92–93); Hungary
- Occupation: Children's book illustrator
- Writing career
- Notable awards: Governor General's Award (1979, 1983); Amelia Frances Howard-Gibbon Illustrator's Award (1980)

László Gál (born 1933, in Hungary) is a Canadian children's illustrator of over 40 books. He has won the Governor General's Award for English-language children's illustration three times and the Amelia Frances Howard-Gibbon Illustrator's Award once.

Gál was born in Hungary in 1933. After receiving a diploma in art education, he spent three years teaching in Budapest. During the Hungarian Revolution of 1956, he immigrated to Canada, where he lived in Toronto and worked various service jobs. Eventually, he gained a position as an artist with The Globe and Mail. Then, from 1958 to 1965, he worked as a graphic designer with the CBC.

Following a vacation to Italy, Gál lived in Verona from 1965 to 1969, at which point his career in children's illustration began. While initially on vacation, he shared some of his artwork with Italian publishing house Arnoldo Mondadori. This resulted in him creating illustrations for El Cid, after which he started illustrating children's books for the publishing house.

Gál returned to Canada in 1970, at which point he began illustrating freelance. He published his Canadian first book, Cartier Discovers the Saint Lawrence, written by William Toye, in 1970. Following this, he illustrated dozens more children's books, which have won him several awards, including the IODE Jean Throop Book Award, Governor General's Award for English-language children's illustration, and Amelia Frances Howard-Gibbon Illustrator's Award.

== Awards and honours ==
Awards for Gál's works
Year	Title	Award	Result	Ref.
1978	Why the Man in the Moon Is Not Happy and Other Eskimo Tales of Creation	IODE Jean Throop Book Award	Winner	
1979	The Twelve Dancing Princesses	Canada Council Children's Literature Prize for English-language illustration (Note: Now the Governor General's Award for English-language children's illustration.)	Winner	
1980	The Twelve Dancing Princesses	Amelia Frances Howard-Gibbon Illustrator's Award	Winner	
1983	The Little Mermaid	Canada Council Children's Literature Prize for English-language illustration	Winner	
1987	The Enchanted Tapestry	Governor General's Award for English-language children's illustration	Finalist	

== Select publications ==
- Toye, William (1970). Cartier Discovers the St. Lawrence. Illustrated by László Gál. Walck.
- Melzack, Ronald (1970). Raven, Creator of the World. Illustrated by László Gál. Little, Brown and Co.
- Engel, Marian (1977). My Name Is Not Odessa Yarker. Illustrated by László Gál. Kids Can Press.
- Melzack, Ronald (retelling) (1977). Why the Man in the Moon Is Not Happy and Other Eskimo Tales of Creation. Illustrated by László Gál. McClelland and Stewart.
- Grimm, Brothers; Lunn, Janet (1979). The Twelve Dancing Princesses. Illustrated by László Gál. Methuen Books.
- Andersen, Hans Christian; Maloney, Margaret Crawford (1983). The Little Mermaid. Illustrated by László Gál. Methuen Books.
- Martin, Eva (1984). Canadian Fairy Tales. Illustrated by László Gál. Groundwood.
- Martin, Eva (1987). Tales of the Far North. Illustrated by László Gál. Dial.
- San Souci, Robert D. (1987). The Enchanted Tapestry. Illustrated by László Gál. Dial.
- Mayer, Marianna (1988). Iduna and the Magic Apples. Illustrated by László Gál. Macmillan.
- Page, P. K. (1989). A Flask of Sea Water. Illustrated by László Gál. Oxford University Press.
- Grimm, Brothers; Mayer, Marianna (1990). The Spirit of the Blue Light. Illustrated by László Gál. Macmillan.
- Robertson, Joanne (1991). Sea Witches. Illustrated by László Gál. Dial.
- Smythe, Anne (1996). Islands. Illustrated by László Gál. Groundwood.
- Gál, László; Gal, Raffaella (1997). The Parrot. Groundwood.
- Stoker, Bram; Wynne-Jones, Tim (1997). Dracula. Illustrated by László Gál. Key Porter Kids.
- Katz, Welwyn Wilton (1999). Beowulf. Illustrated by László Gál. Groundwood.
