= Ron Lightburn =

Canadian illustrator and painter

Ron Lightburn (born 24 June 1954) is a Canadian illustrator turned landscape painter. Lightburn started his artistic career as a visual merchandiser before he moved on to illustrations by 1984. He created seventeen book covers leading up to 1994. In 1991, Lightburn expanded his illustrative career to children's books.

== Early life and education ==
Lightburn's was born in Cobourg, Ontario on 24 June 1954. During his childhood, he created comic books while living in Vancouver. During the 1970s, Lightburn went to the Alberta College of Art.

== Career ==
During the mid 1970s, he went to Victoria, British Columbia after his education. Lightburn began his career as a visual merchandiser. By 1984, some publications his illustrations appeared in were for Butchart Gardens and Western Living. He was also interested in creating drawings of actors. During the 1980s, his art was displayed by the North Park Gallery and the Sooke Arena. Between 1984 and 1994, Lightburn created seventeen book covers. Authors he created these artwork for include Denise Robertson and William Bell.

During this time period, Lightburn became a children's book illustrator in 1991 with Waiting for the Whales. He continued his illustrative career before moving to Kentville in 1997. Leading up to 2012, Lightburn contributed to multiple publications by Sheryl McFarlane and Nan Gregory as part of his 13 illustrated books. In 2015, he provided the artwork and became an author with Frankenstink! Garbage Gone Bad. Outside of books, he created a highway sign on William Hall during 2011. After ending his literature career in 2015, he created his third Nova Scotia Highway 101 sign as a landscape painter during 2017.

== Illustrative style and topics ==
Lightburn used "rough sketches ... to work out content, colour and composition" for his illustrations. He used pencil crayons for his drawings until he switched to oil paint in 1999. Throughout his career, his creations were based on photos. Some of his inspirations were Alfred Bestall, Mary Cassatt and Stanley Kubrick. The people in Waiting for the Whales were based on people Lightburn knew. He continued this process for Driftwood Cove.

Lightburn focused on "sensitive subjects such as death and illness" before moving on to different topics. Additional subjects included the juba dance and Rick Hansen. With Eagle Dreams, Lightburn went to the Royal British Columbia Museum and Cobble Hill, British Columbia. In works with his wife, Driftwood Cove was inspired by people who lived on Sombrio Beach. Pumpkin People was based on a tradition they learnt about while living in Nova Scotia.

== Honours ==
In 1984, Lightburn received the Graphic Illustration Award as part of the Western Magazine Awards. For Waiting for the Whales, Lightburn won the Amelia Frances Howard-Gibbon Illustrator's Award during 1992. He also received the Elizabeth Mrazik-Cleaver Canadian Picture Book Award and Governor General's Award for English-language children's illustration that year. With Nan Gregory, he co-won a Mr. Christie's Book Award in 1996 for How Smudge Came. Their book was also nominated for a Ruth Schwartz Children's Book Award that year.

Lightburn was nominated for the Book Illustration of the Year with Wild Girl and Gran during the 2001 Alberta Book Awards. At the Atlantic Book Awards, Lightburn was a nominee for the Lillian Shepherd Memorial Award for Excellence in Illustration with The Happily Ever Afternoon during 2007. He received this award in 2016 with Frankenstink!: Garbage Gone Bad.
