= Canadian Library Association Book of the Year for Children Award =

Annual Canadian literary award

The Canadian Library Association Book of the Year for Children Award was a literary award given annually to recognize a Canadian children's book. The award was given to a book written in English by a citizen or permanent resident of Canada and published in Canada during the preceding year.

The award was administered and presented by the Canadian Library Association (CLA) until the organization disbanded in 2016. It was inaugurated in 1947 by an award to Roderick Haig-Brown for Starbuck Valley Winter (Note: The inaugural, 1947 award-winning book was Starbuck Valley Winter by Roderick Haig-Brown, illustrated by Charles De Feo. It had been published during 1943 in the U.S. (New York: William Morrow, OCLC 2883591); 1944 in the U.K. (London: William Collins, OCLC 9415906). A "Victory Edition" was published 1946 in Canada (Toronto: Collins, OCLC 630077).) and it was presented to one book every year without exception from 1963 to 2016. As of 2016, two Book of the Year for Children criteria were "appeal to children up to and including age 12" and "creative (i.e., original) writing (i.e., fiction, poetry, narrative, non-fiction, retelling of traditional literature)".

The companion CLA Young Adult Book Award was presented annually from 1981. Corresponding criteria for the YA Book Award are "[appeal] to young adults between the ages of 13 and 18" and "fiction (novel, collection of short stories, or graphic novel)". Two books have won both the children's and young-adult awards (below).

== Winners ==
There were two awards in 1966 and no award six times from 1948 to 1962. From 1967, the award-winning books were published during the preceding year; to 1965, most of the winning books were published during the second preceding year; the 1966 winners were published one each in 1964 and 1965.

- 1947 – Roderick Haig-Brown, Starbuck Valley Winter (1943) (Collins)
- 1948 – no award
- 1949 – Mabel Dunham, Kristli's Trees (McClelland & Stewart)
- 1950 – Richard S. Lambert, Franklin of the Arctic: a life of adventure (McClelland & Stewart)
- 1951 – no award
- 1952 – Catherine Anthony Clark, The Sun Horse (Macmillan of Canada)
- 1953 – no award
- 1954 – no award
- 1955 – no award
- 1956 – Louise Riley, Train for Tiger Lily (Macmillan of Canada)
- 1957 – Cyrus Macmillan, Glooskap's Country and Other Indian Tales (posthumous reissue) (Note: Glooskap's Country (Oxford University Press, 1955 or 1956) was a posthumous reissue of stories collected by the folklorist Macmillan and published in Canadian Wonder Tales (1918) or Canadian Fairy Tales (1922). OCLC 756287533. Retrieved 2015-07-24.) (Oxford University Press)
- 1958 – Farley Mowat, Lost in the Barrens (Little, Brown and Company)
- 1959 – John F. Hayes, The Dangerous Cove: a story of the early days in Newfoundland (Copp Clark)
- 1960 – Marius Barbeau and Michael Hornyansky, The Golden Phoenix and Other Fairy Tales from Quebec (also catalogued as "... Other French-Canadian Fairy Tales", OCLC 465832224) (Oxford University Press)
- 1961 – William Toye, The St. Lawrence (Oxford University Press)
- 1962 – no award
- 1963 – Sheila Burnford, The Incredible Journey (Little, Brown and Company)
- 1964 – Roderick Haig-Brown, The Whale People (Collins)
- 1965 – Dorothy M. Reid, Tales of Nanabozho (Oxford University Press)
- 1966 – James Archibald Houston, Tikta'liktak: an Eskimo Legend (1965) (Longman)
- 1966 – James McNeill, The Double Knights: More Tales from Round the World (1964) (Oxford University Press)
- 1967 – Christie Harris, Raven's Cry (McClelland & Stewart)
- 1968 – James Archibald Houston, The White Archer: an Eskimo Legend (Kestrel Press)
- 1969 – Kay Hill, And Tomorrow the Stars (Dodd)
- 1970 – Edith Fowke, Sally Go Round the Sun: 300 songs, rhymes, and games of Canadian children (McClelland & Stewart)
- 1971 – William Toye, Cartier Discovers the St. Lawrence (Oxford University Press)
- 1972 – Ann Blades, Mary of Mile 18 (Tundra Books)
- 1973 – Ruth Nichols, The Marrow of the World (Macmillan of Canada)
- 1974 – Elizabeth Cleaver, The Miraculous Hind: a Hungarian legend (Holt Rinehart)
- 1975 – Dennis Lee, Alligator Pie (Macmillan of Canada)
- 1976 – Mordecai Richler, Jacob Two-Two Meets the Hooded Fang (McClelland & Stewart)
- 1977 – Christie Harris, Mouse Woman and the Vanished Princesses (McClelland & Stewart)
- 1978 – Dennis Lee, Garbage Delight (Macmillan of Canada)
- 1979 – Kevin Major, Hold Fast (Clarke, Irwin & Company)
- 1980 – James Archibald Houston, River Runners (McClelland & Stewart)
- 1981 – Donn Kushner, The Violin-Maker's Gift (Macmillan of Canada)
- 1982 – Janet Lunn, The Root Cellar (Lester & Orpen Dennys)
- 1983 – Brian Doyle, Up to Low (Groundwood Books)
- 1984 – Jan Hudson, Sweetgrass (Tree Frog Press)
- 1985 – Jean Little, Mama's Going to Buy You a Mockingbird (Penguin Books)
- 1986 – Cora Taylor, Julie (Western Producer Prairie Books)
- 1987 – Janet Lunn, Shadow in Hawthorn Bay (Lester & Orpen Dennys)
- 1988 – Kit Pearson, A Handful of Time (Penguin Books)
- 1989 – Brian Doyle, Easy Avenue (Groundwood Books)
- 1990 – Kit Pearson, The Sky is Falling (Penguin Books)
- 1991 – Michael Bedard, Redwork (Lester & Orpen Dennys)
- 1992 – Kevin Major, Eating Between the Lines (Doubleday Canada)
- 1993 – Celia Barker Lottridge, Ticket to Curlew; also issued as Ticket to Canada (Groundwood Books/Douglas & McIntyre)
- 1994 – Tim Wynne-Jones, Some of the Kinder Planets (Groundwood Books/Douglas & McIntyre)
- 1995 – Cora Taylor, Summer of the Mad Monk (Douglas & McIntyre)
- 1996 – Maxine Trottier, The Tiny Kite of Eddie Wing (Stoddart Publishing)
- 1997 – Brian Doyle, Uncle Ronald (Groundwood Books)
- 1998 – Kenneth Oppel, Silverwing (HarperCollins)
- 1999 – Tim Wynne-Jones, Stephen Fair (Groundwood Books/ Douglas & McIntyre)
- 2000 – Kenneth Oppel, Sunwing (HarperCollins)
- 2001 – Nan Gregory, Wild Girl & Gran (Red Deer Press)
- 2002 – Jean Little, Orphan at My Door: the home child diary of Victoria Cope (Scholastic Canada)
- 2003 – Karen Levine, Hana's Suitcase: a true story (Second Story Press)
- 2004 – Brian Doyle, Boy O'Boy (Groundwood Books/Douglas & McIntyre)
- 2005 – Anne Laurel Carter, Last Chance Bay (Penguin Books)
- 2006 – Pamela Porter, The Crazy Man (Groundwood Books)
- 2007 – Hadley Dyer, Johnny Kellock Died Today (HarperCollins)
- 2008 – Christopher Paul Curtis, Elijah of Buxton (Scholastic Canada)
- 2009 – Anne Laurel Carter, The Shepherd's Granddaughter (Groundwood Books)
- 2010 – Nancy Hartry, Watching Jimmy (Tundra Books)
- 2011 – Kenneth Oppel, Half Brother (HarperCollins)
- 2012 – Kit Pearson, The Whole Truth (HarperCollins Canada)
- 2013 – Susin Nielsen, The Reluctant Journal of Henry K. Larsen (Tundra Books)
- 2014 – Allan Stratton, The Curse of the Dream Witch (Scholastic Canada)
- 2015 – Jonathan Auxier, The Night Gardener (Penguin Books Canada)
- 2016 - Kenneth Oppel, The Nest (HarperCollins Canada)

== Repeat winners ==
Many of Canada's most beloved authors have won this award multiple times:

- Roderick Haig-Brown won in 1947 and 1964
- William Toye won in 1961 and 1971
- James Archibald Houston won in 1966, 1968, and 1980
- Christie Harris won in 1967 and 1977
- Dennis Lee (author) won in 1975 and 1978
- Kevin Major won in 1979 and 1992
- Janet Lunn won in 1982 and 1987
- Brian Doyle (writer) won in 1983, 1989, and 1997
- Jean Little won in 1985 and 2002
- Cora Taylor won in 1986 and 1995
- Kit Pearson won in 1988, 1990, and 2012
- Tim Wynne-Jones won in 1994 and 1999
- Kenneth Oppel is the first author to have won the award four times: in 1998, 2000, 2011, and 2016
- Anne Laurel Carter won in 2005 and 2009

== Winners of multiple awards ==
Two books have won the CLA Young Adult Book Award as well as the Book of the Year for Children: Shadow in Hawthorn Bay by Janet Lunn, in 1987, and Half Brother by Kenneth Oppel, in 2011.

Nine books named CLA Book of the Year for Children have also won the Governor General's Award for English-language children's literature, or the preceding Canada Council Children's Literature Prize, or earlier Governor General's Award for juvenile fiction (in all, conferred for English-language books from 1949 to 1958 and 1975 to present). The writers and CLA award dates were Richard S. Lambert 1950, Farley Mowat 1958, Kevin Major 1979, Cora Taylor 1986, Janet Lunn 1987, Michael Bedard 1991, Tim Wynne-Jones 1994, Pamela Porter 2006, Susin Nielsen 2013.

Thus Shadow in Hawthorn Bay (Lester & Orpen Dennys, 1986) by Janet Lunn won three major Canadian awards, the CLA awards for both children's and young-adult literature and the Governor General's Award in its last year as the Canada Council Children's Literature Prize.

== See also ==
- CLA Young Adult Book Award
- Amelia Frances Howard-Gibbon Illustrator's Award
- ALA Newbery Medal
- British Carnegie Medal – spans children's and young-adult literature
