= Todd Stewart =

Canadian children's book author and illustrator

- Occupations: Children's author and illustrator
- Writing career
- Notable work: Skating Wild on an Inland Sea (2023)
- Notable awards: Elizabeth Mrazik-Cleaver Canadian Picture Book Award (2023); Governor General's Award (2024); TD Canadian Children's Literature Award (2024)

Todd Stewart is a Canadian children's book author and illustrator. Among other honors, he has won the Elizabeth Mrazik-Cleaver Canadian Picture Book Award (2023), Governor General's Award for English-language Young People's Literature - Illustrated Books (2024), and TD Canadian Children's Literature Award (2024).

As an author, Stewart's works include Quand le vent souffle (2019), which was translated as The Wind and the Trees (2021), and Little Moments in a Big Universe (2025). As an illustrator, Stewart's works include Andrew Larsen's See You Next Year (2013), Patchen Barss's Flow Spin Grow (2018), Amélie Dumoulin's Pipo (2019), Charles Quimper's Sous un ciel sans plafond (2021), and Jean E. Pendziwol's Skating Wild on an Inland Sea (2023).

Although Stewart was raised in the Canadian Prairies, as of 2026, he lives in Montreal.

== Awards ==
Awards for Stewart's works
Year	Work	Award	Result	Ref.
2016	See You Next Year	Elizabeth Mrazik-Cleaver Canadian Picture Book Award	Finalist	
2020	Pipo	TD Canadian Children's Literature Award	Finalist	
2020	Pipo	Prix des libraires du Québec	Finalist	
2020	Quand le vent souffle	TD Canadian Children's Literature Award	Finalist	
2021	The Wind and the Trees	Governor General's Award for English-language children's illustration	Finalist	
2023	Skating Wild on an Inland Sea	Elizabeth Mrazik-Cleaver Canadian Picture Book Award	Winner	
2024	Skating Wild on an Inland Sea	Governor General's Award for English-language children's illustration	Winner	
2024	Skating Wild on an Inland Sea	Marilyn Baillie Picture Book Award	Finalist	
2024	Skating Wild on an Inland Sea	TD Canadian Children's Literature Award	Winner	
2025	Little Moments in a Big Universe	Elizabeth Mrazik-Cleaver Canadian Picture Book Award	Finalist	
2026	Little Moments in a Big Universe	Richard Allen Chase Memorial Award	Finalist	

== Publications ==
- Larsen, Andrew (2013). See You Next Year. Illustrated by Todd Stewart. Owlkids Books.
- Barss, Patchen (2018). Flow Spin Grow: Looking for Patterns in Nature. Illustrated by Todd Stewart. Owlkids Books.
- Dumoulin, Amélie (2019). Pipo (in French). Illustrated by Todd Stewart. Québec Amérique.
- Stewart, Todd (2019). Quand le vent souffle (in French). Comme des géants.
  - Stewart, Todd (2021). The Wind and the Trees. Translated by Nadine Robert. Owlkids Books.
  - Stewart, Toos (2022). The Wind and the Trees (Video). Animated by Brigitte Archambault. Edited by Kara Blake. Sound design by Gordon Neil Allen. Music by Jace Lasek and Olga Goreas. Produced by Joanne Robertson.
- Quimper, Charles (2021). Sous un ciel sans plafond (in French). Illustrated by Todd Stewart. Éditions Québec Amérique.
- Pendziwol, Jean E. (2023). Skating Wild on an Inland Sea. Illustrated by Todd Stewart. Groundwood Books.
- Stewart, Todd (2025). Little Moments in a Big Universe. Owlkids Books.

== Filmography ==
- Blake, Kara (2015). Devastation. Animated by Brigitte Archambault. Illustrated by Todd Stewart.
- Stewart, Todd (2017). Silver Shadows. Music by Jace Lasek and Olga Goreas. Composed by Kara Blake.
- Blake, Kara (2018). The Snowball Treasury. Animated by Brigitte Archambault. Illustrated by Todd Stewart.
