= Kady MacDonald Denton =

Canadian children's book creator

- Born: 22 July 1941 (age 85); Winnipeg, Manitoba, Canada
- Occupations: Illustrator, writer
- Writing career
- Genre: Children's picture books
- Website: Official website

Kady MacDonald Denton (born 22 July 1941) is a Canadian creator of children's books, primarily an illustrator of picture books. (Note: Asked in 2011 whether she is an "illustrator or an author/illustrator", she labeled herself "Illustrator/author". As of 14 July 2014 she lists 18 books published from 2000, of which she wrote one; 23 published earlier, of which she wrote as many as seven.) She observed in 2011 that "I'm in that quickly-shrinking group of illustrators who doesn’t use a computer at any stage in the illustration process."

== Life ==
Denton was born in Winnipeg, Manitoba, and raised in Toronto, Ontario. She studied at the University of Toronto, the Banff School of Fine Arts, and the Chelsea School of Art. She and her husband live in Peterborough, Ontario.

== Career ==
Early in the 1990s, Denton illustrated three Kingfisher collections of retellings by Ann Pilling, which have been reissued. For another Kingfisher collection several years later, A Child's Treasury of Nursery Rhymes, she won the 1998 Governor General's Award for English language children's illustration, and also the 1999 Amelia Frances Howard-Gibbon Illustrator's Award and Elizabeth Mrazik-Cleaver Canadian Picture Book Awards. Previously, she had won the Amelia Frances Howard-Gibbon award for 'Til All the Stars Have Fallen: Canadian Poems for Children, edited by David Booth. She won the Mrazik-Cleaver award again in 2006 for Snow, written by Joan Clark.

The Children's Literature Association named Would They Love a Lion? (Kingfisher, 1995), which Denton both wrote and illustrated, as an Honor Winner of the 2015 Phoenix Picture Book Award, which annually recognises a picture book with lasting value that did not win a major award 20 years earlier. "Books are considered not only for the quality of their illustrations, but for the way pictures and text work together."

== Selected works ==
=== As illustrator ===
- What Are You Doing, Benny? by Cary Fagan (Tundra, 2019) ISBN 9781770498570
- The Bear and Mouse series by Bonny Becker (Candlewick)
  - A Christmas for Bear (Sep 2017), ISBN 978-0763649234
  - A Library Book for Bear (Jul 2014), ISBN 9780763649241
  - A Birthday for Bear (Sep 2012), ISBN 9780763658236
  - The Sniffles for Bear (Sep 2011), ISBN 9780763647568
  - A Bedtime for Bear (Sep 2010), ISBN 9780763641016
  - A Visitor for Bear (Feb 2008), ISBN 9780763628079
- The Good-Pie Party, by Liz Gartlon Scanlon (Arthur A. Levine, Mar 2014), ISBN 9780545448703
- The Queen of France, by Tim Wadham, (Candlewick, Mar 2011), ISBN 9780763641023
- You're Mean, Lily Jean!, by Frieda Wishinsky (North Winds, Sep 2009)
- A Sea-Wishing Day, by Robert Heidbreder
- Snow, by Joan Clark
- A Second Is a Hiccup: A Child's Book of Time, by Hazel Hutchins
- I Gave My Mom a Castle, by Jean Little
- Amber Waiting, by Nan Gregory
- Elephant Child, by Mary Ellis
- In the Light of the Moon and Other Bedtime Stories, by Sam McBratney
- Two Homes, by Clare Masurel
- I Wished for a Unicorn, by Robert Heidbreder
- The Arctic Fox, by Mary Ellis
- If I Were Your Father, by Margaret Park Bridges
- If I Were Your Mother, by Margaret Park Bridges
- The Umbrella Party, by Janet Lunn
- Toes Are to Tickle, by Shen Roddie
- The Kingfisher Children's Bible: Stories from the Old and New Testaments, retold by Ann Pilling
- Realms of Gold: Myths and Legends from Around the World, by Ann Pilling
- Jenny and Bob, by David Wynn Millward
- The Travelling Musicians, retold by P.K. Page
- Before I Go to Sleep: Bible Stories, Poems and Prayers for Children, selected and retold by Ann Pilling
- The Story of Little Quack, by Betty Gibson
- 'Til All the Stars Have Fallen: Canadian Poems for Children, selected by David Booth
- The Ned series by Pam Zinneman-Hope
  - Find Your Coat, Ned
  - Let's Play Ball, Ned
  - Let's Go Shopping, Ned
  - Time for Bed, Ned

=== As author and illustrator ===
- A Child's Treasury of Nursery Rhymes (1998)
- Watch Out, William! (1996)
- Would They Love a Lion? (1995)
- The Christmas Boot (1990)
- Janet's Horses (1990)
- Dorothy's Dream (1989)
- Granny Is a Darling (1988)
- The Picnic (1988)
