= Barbara Reid =

Canadian illustrator and writer

- Born: November 16, 1957 (age 68); Toronto, Ontario, Canada
- Education: Ontario College of Art
- Occupations: Illustrator and author
- Writing career
- Notable awards: Vicky Metcalf Award

Barbara Reid (born November 16, 1957) is a Canadian illustrator and author of children's books. She has been called "one of Canada's major literary figures". In 2012, she received the Vicky Metcalf Award for Literature for Young People, an honour presented annually to a writer or illustrator whose body of work has been "inspirational to Canadian youth".

== Biography ==
Reid was born in Toronto, Ontario, on November 16, 1957, and studied at the Ontario College of Art.

After graduation, she began her career creating illustrations for textbooks, after which she began illustrating children's books. She is known for her unique, sculpted-clay imagery, which was established with her illustrations for Elizabeth Clark's The New Baby Calf (1984). She creates her illustrations by starting with a pencil drawing, then builds up the image using coloured modelling clay to give it a three-dimensional effect. The result is then photographed and used as an illustration. The resulting illustrations are "detail rich" and often "invoke laughter and wonder."

Reid's work has been published in over 21 countries, including Canada, the United States, Great Britain, Australia, New Zealand, Finland, Norway, China, Germany, Brazil and Thailand.

== Awards and honours ==
In 2006, Reid won the Canadian Library Association's Children's Illustrator of the Year award. The following year, she won the organization's award for Children's Author of the Year. In 2012, she won the organization's Libris Award for Picture Book.

In 2012, she received the Vicky Metcalf Award for Literature for Young People, an honour presented annually to a writer or illustrator whose body of work has been "inspirational to Canadian youth".

In 2017, the York Region District School Board honoured Barbara Reid by naming a new school in Stouffville, Ontario - Barbara Reid Public School. The elementary school serves students from Kindergarten to Grade in a new subdivision in Stouffville.

Awards for Reid's work
Year	Title	Award	Result	Ref.
1986	Have You Seen Birds?	Canada Council Children's Literature Prize	Winner	
1986	Have You Seen Birds?	IODE Book Award	Winner	
1987	Have You Seen Birds?	Elizabeth Mrazik-Cleaver Canadian Picture Book Award	Winner	
1992	Zoe series	Mr. Christie's Book Award for English - Illustration	Winner	
1993	Two By Two	Elizabeth Mrazik-Cleaver Canadian Picture Book Award	Winner	
1995	Gifts	Amelia Frances Howard-Gibbon Illustrator's Award	Winner	
1996	Gifts	International Board on Books for Young People	Honour	
1997	The Party	Governor General's Award for English-language children's illustration	Winner	
1997	The Party	Amelia Frances Howard-Gibbon Illustrator's Award	Winner	
2003	The Subway Mouse	Governor General's Award for English-language children's illustration	Finalist	
2004	The Subway Mouse	Ruth and Sylvia Schwartz Children’s Book Award	Winner	
2004	Peg and the Yeti	Governor General's Award for English-language children's illustration	Finalist	
2009	Fox Walked Alone	International Board on Books for Young People	Honour	
2010	Perfect Snow	Amelia Frances Howard-Gibbon Illustrator's Award	Winner	
2012	Picture a Tree	Governor General's Award for English-language children's illustration	Finalist	
2014	The Night Before Christmas	Libris Award for Picture Book	Winner	

== Selected works ==
=== As author ===
- Sing a Song of Mother Goose (1987)
- Playing with Plasticine (1988), non-fiction
- Two By Two (1992)
- Zoe's Year (1992)
- The Party (1997)
- Fun with Modeling Clay (1998), non-fiction
- The Golden Goose (2000)
- Read Me a Book (2004)
- The Subway Mouse (2004)
- Fox Walked Alone (2009)
- Perfect Snow (2009)
- Picture a Tree (2011)
- Welcome Baby (2013)
- The Night Before Christmas (2013)

=== As illustrator ===
- The New Baby Calf by Edith Newlin Chase (1984)
- Have You Seen Birds? by Joanne Oppenheim (1986)
- Effie by Bev Allinson (1990)
- Gifts by Jo Ellen Bogart (1994)
