= Paul Morin (illustrator) =

Canadian children's book illustrator

Paul Morin (born 14 January 1959) is a Canadian artist and children's book illustrator. Morin started painting in 1977 before working as a freelancer throughout the 1980s. In 1990, Morin began his children's book illustrative career and had contributed to twenty books by the mid-2010s. Of his illustrations, Morin won the 1990 Governor General's Award for English-language children's illustration with The Orphan Boy. He also received the Amelia Frances Howard-Gibbon Illustrator's Award for The Orphan Boy in 1991 and The Dragon's Pearl in 1993. As an artist, Morin established multiple art galleries in Ontario from the late 2000s to early 2010s. He also designed the food packaging for the maple leaf cream cookies for Dare Foods.

== Early life and education ==
On 14 January 1959, Morin was born in Calgary, Alberta. During his childhood, Morin lived in Montreal until he was an adult. For his post-secondary education, Morin began studying art at Grant MacEwan College. He later continued his studies at Sheridan College before going to the Ontario College of Art.

== Career ==
Morin started painting in 1977 and worked in Toronto as a freelancer during the 1980s. For his freelance career, Morin worked on film and literary artwork as an illustrator. In specific projects, Morin created billboard advertisements on Aida for the Canadian Opera Company. Morin also created advertisements for the SkyDome's 1989 opening.

In 1990, Morin's first children's books illustrations appeared in a work written by Tololwa M. Mollel called The Orphan Boy. Throughout the 1990s, Morin continued to illustrate children's books for authors including Joseph Bruchac, Betsy James and Alice McLerran. By the mid-2010s, his children's illustrations had appeared in twenty books. For his own works, Morin published Animal Dreaming in 1998 and provided the illustrations in the book.

By 2000, Morin's art creations were shown at the Canadian Museum of Civilization and Wellington County Museum. From 2007 to 2012, Morin established art galleries in Rockwood, Ontario, Erin, Ontario and the Alton Mill Art Center. For his gallery works, Morin primarily focused on landscape paintings. In 2015, Morin bought a town hall in Alton, Ontario and spent almost two years converting it into an art gallery. Outside of his own galleries, Morin had heirlooms and artwork shown at the Milton Centre for the Arts in 2015. Leading up to that year, he had previously designed the food packaging for the maple leaf cream cookies made by Dare Foods. By 2020, Morin had expanded his artistry into art installations and sculpture.

== Designs and themes ==
With his children's books illustrations in the 1990s, Morin drew pictures on the Maasai people, Abenaki, Anasazi, and Ojibway. He also wrote about Chinese mythology, the Ghost Dance and the Dreamtime in Australia. To generate ideas for his illustrations, Morin travelled across the world and conducted in-person research. While illustrating, he played music he co-created that incorporated the local sounds he heard when he was completing his studies.

In individual illustrations, Morin used natural materials he collected to create his illustrations for The Orphan Boy. His illustrations were incorporated from twenty oil paintings he had created after living with the Maasai people in Kenya. With The Dragon's Pearl, Morin drew items he discovered while researching in Yangshuo, China. With Fox Song, Morin practiced basket weaving and referenced The Orphan Boy by including a bracelet made by the Maasai. For The Mud Family, Morin designed a cliff in his house based on one he saw in Utah that was covered with human hand prints. With The Ghost Dance and The Ghost Seeker, Morin included artwork about spiritual visions.

== Awards ==
Morin won the Amelia Frances Howard-Gibbon Illustrator's Award twice with The Orphan Boy in 1991 and The Dragon's Pearl in 1993. He was nominated in 2002 for this award with What the Animals Were Waiting For. During 1993, The Dragon's Pearl was a Ruth Schwartz Award for Excellence in Children's Literature nominee. Additional awards that The Orphan Boy received were the 1990 Governor General's Award for English-language children's illustration and 1991 Elizabeth Mrazik-Cleaver Canadian Picture Book Award. In 2018, Morin was honored by Caledon, Ontario for his work on the town hall in Alton.

== Personal life ==
Morin is married and has two adult children.
