= Elizabeth Cleaver =

Canadian children's illustrator

- Cleaver
- Born: Elizabeth Ann Mrazik; November 19, 1939 Montreal, Quebec, Canada
- Died: July 27, 1985 (aged 46) Montreal, Quebec, Canada
- Occupation: Illustrator, writer
- Genre: Children's literature

Elizabeth Ann Mrazik Cleaver (19 November 1939 – 27 July 1985) was a Canadian illustrator and writer of children's books. She contributed to twelve children's books and one adult book between the late 1960s to mid 1980s. These works included five of her own works and four by William Toye. Many of her illustrations appeared in mythological stories by the Indigenous peoples. Outside of literature, she was a puppet designer for the Centaur Theatre and taught shadow puppetry in Baker Lake, Northwest Territories by 1972.

Two of her books, The Wind Has Wings: Poems from Canada and The Loon's Necklace were recognized with the Amelia Frances Howard-Gibbon Illustrator's Award during the 1970s by the Canadian Library Association. She was given their 1974 Book of the Year for Children Award for The Miraculous Hind. Cleaver received a 1980 Canada Council Children's Literature Prize for her illustrations in Petrouchka. Her overall illustrations were nominated for a 1972 Hans Christian Andersen Award. The Elizabeth Mrazik-Cleaver Canadian Picture Book Award is named in her honour.

== Early life and education ==
Mrazik was born on 19 November 1939 in Montreal. Her childhood was spent there and Sárospatak, Hungary. She attended Sir George Williams University for her post-secondary education.

Mrazik then went to "the School of Art and Design of the Montreal Museum of Fine Arts and l'École des Beaux Arts, Montreal." In the late 1970s, she went to Concordia University for a Masters of Fine Arts. Her studies was completed in 1980.

== Career ==
By the late 1960s, Cleaver was "working at a Toronto advertising agency." She became an children's book illustrator in 1968 with The Wind Has Wings. Cleaver changed her focus to arts and literature leading up to the early 1970s. By 1972, she was a puppet designer for the Centaur Theatre before teaching shadow puppetry in Baker Lake, Northwest Territories.

Cleaver was an illustrator for twelve children's books and one adult book. These included five of her own works and four by William Toye. She created The Enchanted Caribou before her death in 1985. It was posthumously released that year.

== Creative process and themes ==
Cleaver used monoprinting after creating sketches. She primarily used paper cut outs for her illustrations. Her works also included items from nature and linocuts. Cleaver's illustrations appeared in mythological stories, many of which were originally by the Indigenous peoples. Persian art and appliqué were some of the resources for Cleaver.

In 1972, Cleaver created "The Miraculous hind, a Hungarian legend" for the National Film Board of Canada. It was converted into a book the following year. She drew for a 1980 children's version of Petrouchka by Igor Stravinsky. Cleaver used shadow puppetry in 1985 with The Enchanted Caribou.

== Awards and honours ==
The Canadian Library Association selected Cleaver as the inaugural Amelia Frances Howard-Gibbon Illustrator's Award winner in 1971 for The Wind Has Wings. She re-won the award during 1978 with The Loon's Necklace. Cleaver was given their Book of the Year for Children Award for The Miraculous Hind during 1974. She received a 1980 Canada Council Children's Literature Prize for her illustrations in Petrouchka. These artwork were on the International Board on Books for Young People Honour List in 1982.

For her overall illustrations, Cleaver was nominated for a Hans Christian Andersen Award in 1972. During 1986, IBBY Canada presented their first Elizabeth Mrazik-Cleaver Canadian Picture Book Award. Her illustrations are included in the Jean Thomson Collection of Original Art by the Toronto Public Library. They are also held by the National Library of Canada.

== Personal life and death ==
As Elizabeth Mrazik, she started a marriage in 1965. Her death from cancer occurred on 27 July 1985 in Montreal.
