= Ann Blades =

Canadian illustrator, writer and educator

- Born: November 16, 1947 (age 77); Vancouver, Canada
- Education: University of British Columbia (1970); British Columbia Institute of Technology (1974)
- Notable awards: Canadian Library Association Book of the Year for Children Award (1971); Canada Council Children's Literature Prize (1978); Amelia Frances Howard-Gibbon Illustrator's Award (1979); Elizabeth Mrazik-Cleaver Canadian Picture Book Award (1986)

Ann Blades (born November 16, 1947) is a Canadian illustrator, writer and educator.

She was born in Vancouver, British Columbia. She earned a teaching certificate from the University of British Columbia in 1970. In 1974, she graduated in nursing from the British Columbia Institute of Technology. Blades taught school in a number of isolated communities in British Columbia.

Her first book Mary of Mile 18, published in 1971, received the Canadian Library Association Book of the Year for Children Award. It was followed by A Boy of Taché in 1973. Mary of Mile 18 was made into a film by the National Film Board of Canada. Her illustrations were included in an exhibition "Canada at Bologna" at the 1990 Bologna Children's Book Fair in Italy.

== Selected works ==
- The Cottage at Crescent Beach (1977)
- Jacques the Woodcutter (1977) text by Michael Macklem
- A Salmon for Simon (1978) text by Betty Waterton, received the Canada Council Children's Literature Prize
- Six Darn Cows (1980), text by Margaret Laurence
- Anna's Pet (1980) text by Margaret Atwood and Joyce Barkhouse
- Pettranella (1980) text by Betty Waterton
- By the Sea: An Alphabet Book (1985), won the Elizabeth Mrazik-Cleaver Canadian Picture Book Award
- Ida and the Wool Smugglers (1987) text by Sue Ann Alderson
- The Singing Basket (1990) retold by Kit Pearson
- A Ride for Martha (1993) text by Sue Ann Alderson
- A Dog Came Too (1993) text by Ainslee Martin
- Back to the Cabin (1996)
- Pond Seasons (1997) text by Sue Ann Alderson
