= Eugene Benson =

Canadian writer (1928–2026)

- Born: July 6, 1928; Northern Ireland
- Died: July 2026 (aged 98)
- Occupations: Writer, editor, librettist
- Spouse: Renate Niklaus (m. 1968)
- Children: 2
- Writing career
- Period: 20th century
- Genre: Non-fiction

Eugene Benson (July 6, 1928 – July 2026) was a Canadian professor of English and a prolific writer, novelist, playwright and librettist.

== Early life ==
Born in Northern Ireland, Benson obtained a bachelor's degree from the National University of Ireland, a master's degree from the University of Western Ontario and his PhD from the University of Toronto.

== Career ==
Benson was the librettist of six operatic works: Héloïse & Abélard (1973, performed by the Canadian Opera Company, music by Charles Wilson); Everyman (1974, performed by the Stratford Festival, music by Charles Wilson); Psycho Red (1978, presented by The Guelph Spring Festival, music by Charles Wilson); Ernest, the Importance of Being (2008, performed by Toronto Operetta Theatre, music by Victor Davies); The Auction: A Folk Opera (2012, premiered by Westben Arts Festival Theatre, music by John Burge); A Tale of Two Cities (2016, premiered by Opera in Concert, Toronto, music by Victor Davies). Everyman and Psycho Red were broadcast by the Canadian Broadcasting Corporation (CBC).

He wrote two novels, The Bulls of Ronda (1976) and the political satire Power Game (1980). He wrote four plays broadcast on the Canadian Broadcasting Corporation and, with his wife, Renate Benson, translated plays from Quebec French. In 2003, he and Bill Fraser adapted Powergame as a TV movie, North of America. His plays include The Ram (1967, broadcast by McGill Radio), Joan of Arc's Violin (broadcast by CBC in 1970 and published and staged in 1972), The Gunner's Rope (broadcast by CBC in 1970 and published and staged in 1972), and The Doctors' Wife (broadcast by the CBC in 1973). With his wife, Renate Benson, Eugene translated a number of French Canadian plays. He edited the periodical Canadian Drama. He wrote four plays broadcast on the Canadian Broadcasting Corporation and, with his wife, Renate Benson, translated plays from Quebec French. He edited the periodical Canadian Drama. In 2003 he and Bill Fraser adapted his political satire Powergame (1980) into the TV movie North of America.

Benson's scholarly publications include J.M. Synge (1982), English-Canadian Theatre (1987), The Oxford Companion to Canadian Theatre (1987), The Routledge Encyclopedia of Post-Colonial Literatures in English (1994, 2nd ed. 2005) — the last three co-edited with L.W. Conolly — and The Oxford Companion to Canadian Literature (1997, second edition, with William Toye). He edited the anthology Encounter: Canadian Drama in Four Media (1973) and the scholarly journal Canadian Drama/L’Art dramatique canadien (1980–90).

Benson was president, administrative director and Budget Officer of the Guelph Spring Festival for many years, and was once Chair of the Writers' Union of Canada (1983–84). He was Founding co-president, with Margaret Atwood, of the Canadian Centre of International PEN (1984–85), and served as its vice-president (1985–90). He was President of PEN Canada in 1984.

In 2019, he published a memoir, The Symmetry of the Tyger, an account of his involvement in Canadian culture.

== Personal life and death ==
Benson married Renate Niklaus, a languages and literature professor at University of Guelph, in 1968. Together they had two sons: Ormonde, a lawyer, and Shaun, an actor. Renate Benson is the author of German Expressionist Drama (1984) and other books.

Benson died in July 2026, at the age of 98.

== Works ==
=== Works edited ===
- The Oxford Companion to Canadian Literature, co-edited with William Toye (1983, 2nd ed. 2006)
- The Oxford Companion to Canadian Theatre, co-edited with L.W Connolly (1989)
- Encyclopedia of Post-Colonial Literatures in English, co-edited with L.W. Connolly (1994, reissued 2005)

== Works written ==
- Encounter: Canadian Drama in Four Media (1973)
- Bulls of Ronda, a novel (1976)
- J.M. Synge, a biography (1980)
- Power Game: The Making of a Prime Minister, a novel (1980)
- English Canadian Theatre, co-written with L.W. Connolly (1987)
- The Symmetry of the Tyger, a memoir (2019)

=== Libretti for operas ===
- Héloïse & Abélard (1973)
- Psycho Red, with music by Charles Wilson (1978)
- Earnest, The Importance of Being, with music by Victor Davies (2008)
- The Tuneful Voice: Selected Libretti, a compilation (2023)
