= IBBY Canada =

Canadian National Section

IBBY Canada is the Canadian National Section of the International Board on Books for Young People, a non-profit organization.

A national organization with representation from coast to coast, IBBY Canada's members include authors, illustrators, publishers, parents, teachers, librarians, booksellers, and academics. Membership is connected through regional councillors, a newsletter, and through programs and activities initiated by both IBBY Canada and their international partners.

IBBY Canada was established in 1980.

== Organization ==
The IBBY Canada executive consists of volunteers from the Canadian children's literature communities, including those who work in publishing or are librarians, booksellers, authors, and academics. The executive holds meetings every three months. Members are invited to attend the annual general meeting, which is usually held in Toronto in February.

== Awards ==
IBBY Canada administers several awards recognizing contributions to Canadian children's literature, including:

- Elizabeth Mrazik-Cleaver Canadian Picture Book Award
  - Established in 1985 in honour of Elizabeth Mrazik-Cleaver, a prominent Canadian book illustrator, this award recognizes a Canadian illustrator of a picture book published in Canada in English or French during the previous calendar year. To be eligible, the book must be a first edition and contain original illustrations. All genres are considered: fiction, non-fiction, poetry, folk and fairy tales.
- Frances E. Russell Award
  - Marjorie Russell set up this award in honour of her sister, Frances, a great supporter of IBBY Canada. It is given in support of research for a publishable work (a book or a paper) on Canadian children's literature.
- Claude Aubry Award
  - This biennial award was established in 1981 in honour of Claude Aubry, who served as director of the Ottawa Public Library, and is given to an individual for distinguished service within the field of children's literature.

In addition to these national awards, IBBY Canada submits Canadian authors and artists for international awards consideration. These include the Hans Christian Andersen Award and the Astrid Lindgren Memorial Award.

== International ==
The International Board on Books for Young People believes in the ability of children's books to bridge cultures and, ultimately, to promote peace. Jella Lepman, founder of the International Youth Library in Munich, started IBBY in 1953 in postwar Germany, with the goal to promote international cultural understanding through children's books.

IBBY is a non-profit organization. Founded in Zurich, Switzerland in 1953, IBBY now has more than 70 National Sections from all over the world.
