= Joyful Noise: Poems for Two Voices =

1988 poetry book by Paul Fleischman

- Joyful Noise book cover
- Author: Paul Fleischman
- Illustrator: Eric Beddows
- Language: English
- Subject: Insects
- Genre: Poetry
- Publisher: Harper & Row
- Publication date: March 1988
- Publication place: United States
- Pages: 64
- ISBN: 0-06-021852-5
- OCLC: 16223845
- Dewey Decimal: 811/.54 19
- LC Class: PS3556.L42268 J69 1988

Joyful Noise: Poems for Two Voices is a book of poetry for children by Paul Fleischman. It won the 1989 Newbery Medal.

The book is a collection of fourteen children's poems about insects such as mayflies, lice, and honeybees. The concept is unusual in that the poems are intended to be read aloud by two people. Some lines are spoken by the readers simultaneously, while others are read alternately by the speakers.

Kirkus Reviews called Joyful Noise "A splendid collection of poems in many moods about the lives and dreams of insects."

Awards
Preceded by Lincoln: A Photobiography	Newbery Medal recipient 1989	Succeeded by Number the Stars
