= Johnny Kellock Died Today =

Canadian children's novel by Hadley Dyer

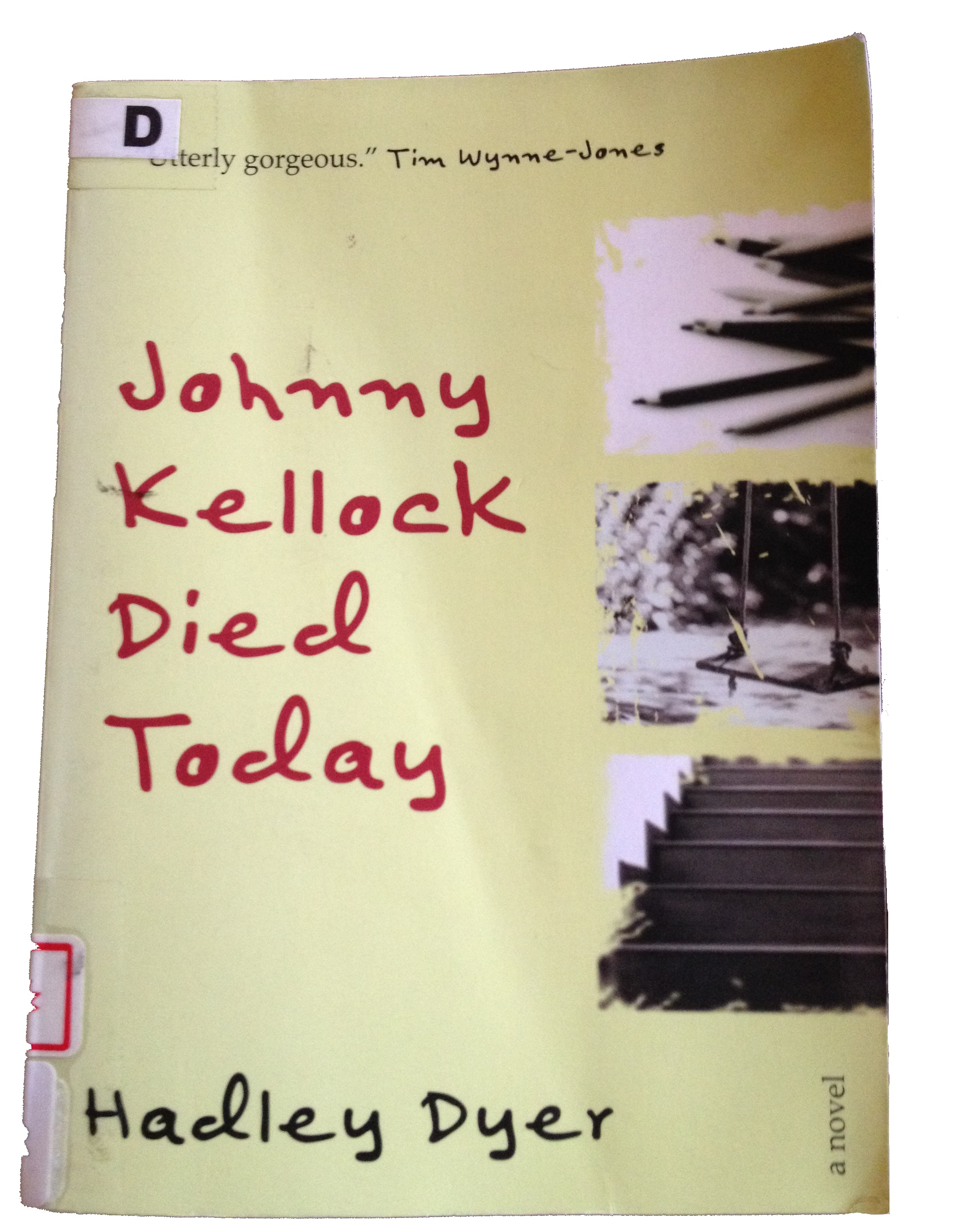
- The cover of Johnny Kellock Died Today
- Author: Hadley Dyer
- Language: English
- Genre: Young Adult, mystery
- Publisher: HarperCollins
- Publication place: Canada
- Pages: 153
- ISBN: 978-0-00-639533-1

Johnny Kellock Died Today is a Canadian Library Association Book of the Year for Children Award winning young adult novel by Canadian author Hadley Dyer. It follows the story of twelve-year-old Rosalie Norman and takes place in Halifax in 1959. When Rosalie's authoritarian mother falls down the stairs and breaks her ankle, she must hire a local boy nicknamed Gravedigger to take care of the family's yard. Upon meeting Gravedigger, Rosalie finds out that her beloved cousin, Johnny, has gone missing. Determined to find out why Johnny has disappeared, unexpected friends, Rosalie and Gravedigger, set out on a journey to find Johnny. Along the way, Rosalie learns about family, friendship, and love. Johnny Kellock Died Today has been praised for its detailed and realistic descriptions, as well as its wit and charm.

== Plot summary ==
Chapter 1

Johnny Kellock Died Today follows twelve-year-old aspiring artist Rosalie Norman. Rosalie is the youngest of six children and claims to have the oldest mother in the world. Rosalie explains that her mother was born in 1899, which is "last century", and that she was already 50 years old when she gave birth to Rosalie. Rosalie likes to tell people that it is a world record, even though she herself doubts it. Rosalie lives with her mother, whom she calls Mama, her father, whom she calls Norman, and her 17-year-old sister, Martha. She begins the story by explaining that her mother always makes her stay outside in the summer. Her mother is not near, however, so Rosalie sits at the bottom of the stairs doing what she loves, drawing. Rosalie's mother forces her to go outside, and as she does, Rosalie notices a boy nicknamed Gravedigger across the street. Rosalie explains that Gravedigger goes to St. Stephen's Elementary School, the Catholic school across the street from her Protestant school, Mulgrave Park Elementary School. Gravedigger has failed sixth grade once already. She then explains that everybody calls him Gravedigger because his family bought a cemetery where he works, digging and taking care of the land. A rumour had gone around that Gravedigger dug up his deceased mother and keeps her in a jelly cupboard in his house. Before Rosalie can continue her thoughts about him, Gravedigger gets her attention, and tells her that he has a letter for Mr. and Mrs. Frederick Norman. Rosalie does not understand, as her brother, Fredrick Norman, lives in another town. By the time Rosalie realizes her father's first name is Frederick, not Norman, she is very embarrassed and takes the letter which she then gives to her father.

Chapter 2

Rosalie returns to her house, only to find her mother lying in pain at the bottom of the stairs. Rosalie immediately notices her pencil crayons and assumes her mother slipped on them. Norman takes care of Mama to the hospital, leaving Rosalie home alone. Rosalie is excited to be home alone for the first time, but feels guilty as she assumes responsibility for her mother's broken ankle. She proceeds to draw a comic book, titled "The Gravedigger Cometh" about the evil Gravedigger, based on the boy across the street. Rosalie becomes tired and goes to sleep. When Norman is home, he wakes Rosalie and explains that Mama is going to be fine.

Chapter 3

The following morning, as Martha cooks breakfast for the family, Mama, Rosalie, and Martha begin talking about Martha and Rosalie's cousin, Johnny. Johnny is a lively boy whom everybody gets along with. The family heads to church. Rosalie is excited when it is time to sing, and sings her loudest and best. After the hymns, an elderly woman behind her suggests that next time she should simply mouth the words. Rosalie gets very upset, but does not say anything. When Rosalie gets home, she releases her emotions by drawing a picture of the elderly woman being attacked by foxes. When she calms down, Rosalie goes outside, only to find Gravedigger doing yard work for her family. Gravedigger explains to Rosalie that her cousin Johnny is missing. Rosalie does not believe him, but begins doing investigating of her own.

Chapter 4

Rosalie asks Mama how Johnny is doing, and they respond nonchalantly. From this, Rosalie assumes that Johnny is doing fine and Gravedigger lied. It is to Rosalie's dismay that she finds out Gravedigger will continue to work for the family. She tries to convince her mother that it is a bad idea, but her mother will not listen to her. Rosalie, again, reflects on the memory of Johnny, but is interrupted when the phone rings. She answers to find out is her Uncle Jim. After giving the phone to her mother, Rosalie begins to question why Jim called, however, she shrugs it off, assuming it was because of her mother's ankle.

Chapter 5

Rosalie receives a collection of drawings from her friend Marcy. She explains that Marcy is not as good at drawing as her, but that Rosalie still pretends that they will both be famous artists one day. As Rosalie leaves the house, she notices the Ragman yelling in the streets. She explains that the Ragman, who is African-American, looks just like a Caucasian boy at her school, but that nobody can get past the colour of his skin and see it too. Rosalie catches up with two of her friends, Katie and Pauline, who are curious about how Rosalie's mother got injured. Rosalie tells the story, playing the part of the hero, watching over her mother until she can be taken to the hospital. Katie and Pauline are in awe.

Chapter 6

After avoiding Gravedigger for a few days, Rosalie decides she needs to talk to him and ask about Johnny. Rosalie asks Gravedigger what he knows about Johnny. Gravedigger explains that he overheard Rosalie's parents talking after she delivered them the letter. They said that Johnny was missing, and also that the 17 year-old had been looking for a job at the shipyard where Gravedigger's brothers work. Gravedigger and Rosalie decide to pair up and begin searching for Johnny.

Chapter 7

Rosalie convinces her mother she is going to the lake, however, her and Gravedigger head to the shipyard instead. At this point, Rosalie and Gravedigger begin to become friends, and Rosalie starts to call Gravedigger by his real name, David. When the two arrive at the shipyard, François, the guard, allows the two to sneak in. David asks what Johnny looks like and Rosalie explains him as having blue eyes, black hair, and being seven feet tall. David tells Rosalie that he cannot be seven feet tall and Rosalie shrugs it off. Before the two get to search for Johnny, David's brother, Gerry, finds them and tells them they have to leave because the shipyard is no place for a girl. Gerry drives them out of the shipyard, but tells Rosalie he will keep an eye out for Johnny. When Rosalie returns home, her parents seem suspicious, however, she tries not to worry about it.

Chapter 8

The following Sunday, Rosalie notices some Catholic boys yelling and making fun of David. David scares the boys, however, and they run away. Norman notices and proceeds to have a conversation with Rosalie about David, explaining that David's mother drowned when she was still young, and that it must be difficult for David. After the conversation, Rosalie's brother, Freddie, his wife, Hazel, Rosalie's sister Margaret, and her husband Cecil, and Martha arrive at the house. The family begins bantering about the children getting married, and Johnny is brought up. Norman starts to say something about him, but notices Rosalie and simply states that she drew a nice picture of him. When Rosalie goes to bed, Norman comes to talk to her, as he always does, and avoids the subject of Johnny. Rosalie is relieved as she is having difficulties not telling Norman that she went the shipyard searching for Johnny.

Chapter 9

Martha and Rosalie go out to get some groceries. During the car ride, they discuss how Martha has promised she is going to university in a year and will be the first of the Normans to get a university degree. Rosalie secretly hopes that she will make it as an artist and not have to go through all of the schooling. While Martha is grocery shopping, Rosalie heads over to the diner across the street, only to see that David is there. Rosalie wonders who David was eating with, noting that he does not have any friends. Before Rosalie can do anything, Martha finds her and the two go to Fort Needham, a grassy hill near the city. The two begin reminiscing about times with Johnny, however, their conversation is cut short when a man with a knife demands Martha give him her purse. Martha hits him upside the head with her purse and the two sisters run until they make it back to the city. That night, Rosalie wakes up and decides to go to Martha's room and ask what has happened to Johnny. When she gets to Martha's room, however, she finds that her bed is empty. Rosalie goes to the living room, where she sees Martha sitting on a chair, holding a cigar box, a large bundle of money, and crying.

Chapter 10

David goes to Rosalie's house and informs her that his brother, Gerry, says there is a new person called John working at the shipyard and that he fits Rosalie's description of Johnny. Rosalie asks if she can go out, making up a phony story, however, Mama will not let her leave the house. In order to get around this, Rosalie spends her time singing very loudly, claiming to be practicing for choir. Eventually Mama gives Rosalie her allowance and tells her that she may go out. When Rosalie and David arrive at the shipyard, Gerry explains that he talked to John and that John seemed as if he had just moved to the city, as Johnny would have. Gerry also explains that Norman had been at the shipyard earlier talking to Gerry and David's father. Gerry says that he would have asked John more questions, but that he did not want to scare him, as he probably ran away because his father was hitting him. Rosalie explains that her Uncle Ezra never hit anybody. Before Rosalie can finish explaining, Gerry notices Martha walking around the shipyard.

Chapter 11

Rosalie, David, and Gerry hide behind Gerry's truck so that Martha cannot see them. David notes that there is something not quite right about Martha. He says that she looks sad in the same way his mother did before she drowned. Rosalie does not know what to say, so simply states that she is hungry. David and Rosalie head to the cemetery to spend some time before they go back to Rosalie's house. David shows Rosalie his mother's grave and Rosalie notices that it is a plain white cross with no markings. The two spend some time talking and swinging on a swing David made. When it gets late, they both head home.

Chapter 12

On Friday, Freddie takes Mama to the doctor to get her cast removed. Rosalie uses her time to devise a plan with David. The two have decided that if either of them sees Martha going somewhere, they will alert the other by either whistling or singing. Rosalie notices that Martha does, in fact, seem sad, and she wonders if Martha will stay with Norman and Mama forever to take care of them. Rosalie decides to further her investigation and opens Mama's cedar jewelry box. She finds multiple letters from Aunt Izzie, Johnny's mother, inside. Martha nearly catches Rosalie, so Rosalie heads downstairs where she has a snack with David. After Martha leaves the house, David realizes that it is not Martha who knows where Johnny is, but Norman is the one who knows.

Chapter 13

When Mama arrives back at the house, her cast is still on, as the doctor told her it was too early to have it removed. Just as she arrives, Norman talks to Freddie and tells him that he needs to borrow his car to go to the shipyard. Freddie agrees and decides to accompany Norman. Rosalie reflects on her favourite memory of Johnny, noting how he seemed like a grown up when he was only 12 years old. David comes to her house, interrupting her reminiscing. He shows her "The Gravedigger Cometh", the comic book she had drawn before meeting him. David gets angry with Rosalie, explaining that he never hurt anybody and neither has any of his family. Rosalie tries to defend herself, but David is very hurt by the comic book and leaves, telling her that her comics are stupid. Rosalie reflects on her artwork. She realizes that David is right and that all of her comic books and other art are just imitations. She explains that all stories are just normal people's experiences, but heavily sensationalized. Rosalie states that nobody every makes comic books about normal people, but that she wishes they did.

Chapter 14

That night, Norman does not go to Rosalie's room when she goes to bed because Norman and Freddie still have not come home for the night. Later that night, when he gets home, Norman goes to Rosalie's room and wakes her. Rosalie tells Norman that she knows Johnny is gone, and Norman explains that the only one of his children he told was Freddie. Rosalie realizes that her Uncle Ezra, Johnny's father, was rough sometimes. She tells Norman and he explains to her that Uncle Ezra has a drinking problem. Norman tells Rosalie he is taking the next day off of work and if she can sneak out of the house with him, he has something to show her. Rosalie happily agrees. The next morning, Norman and Rosalie go to Norman's company warehouse. Inside of the warehouse, there are many cats Norman uses to keep the mouse population down. Norman tells Rosalie to pick a few cats and bring them to David, explaining that maybe it will fix their friendship. When Rosalie gets home with the kittens, her Aunt Izzie is there and gives her a warm greeting, saying that she is excited for Rosalie's birthday tomorrow. Rosalie goes to David's house and gives him the kittens. Although initially upset, David is pleased with the gift and their fight is over.

Chapter 15

As soon as Rosalie gets home from David's house, the phone rings. It is her Uncle Jim again. After a brief conversation with Uncle Jim, Rosalie's Uncle Ezra arrives at the house with a package. David arrives just in time to meet Uncle Ezra. Uncle Ezra places the package on the table, and tells Rosalie to look at it. Rosalie looks; inside there are miscellaneous items such as a watch and a comb, as well as a birth certificate for William John Kellock and a note. Written in block letters on lined paper, are the words JOHNNY KELLOCK DIED TODAY. Uncle Ezra explains that Johnny stole two-thousand dollars from him before he ran away. He proceeds to yell at Mama, demanding she tell him where Johnny is. Mama tells Rosalie and David to leave, but before they can, Ezra grabs Rosalie by the arm. David tries to defend Rosalie, but Mama holds him back. Ezra squeezes Rosalie's arm harder and harder as he yells at Mama. Ezra then grabs Rosalie's ribs with his other hand and threatens to burn her hand over the hot stove beside them. Rosalie tells him Johnny is with Izzie and Norman at the shipyard. Ezra runs off and David chases after him. Before Ezra can make it very far, Rosalie witnesses Norman throwing Ezra across the yard and onto the pavement. Rosalie says that day was the day when Aunt Izzie, Ezra's wife, decided to stay with them for good.

Chapter 16

Norman sits on a chair with his cigar box and a bundle of money. He explains to Aunt Izzie and Mama that Johnny did not steal the money, but that he simply mailed it to Norman for safekeeping. The family has a discussion and Rosalie learns that the John at the shipyard is not Johnny and that Mama never knew about the letter. Martha arrives at the house along with David's brother Gerry. Gerry takes David back to their house. Rosalie and her family celebrate her birthday before everyone leaves. The phone rings and Rosalie answers it; it is Johnny. Before she can say anything, however, he hangs up, realizing he made a mistake calling them. The novel ends with Rosalie apologizing to Mama for causing her to break her ankle. Mama squeezes her arm and does not let go.

== About the author ==
Hadley Dyer is a Canadian writer of literature for children and young adults. She was born in the Annapolis Valley, Nova Scotia, but currently resides in Toronto, Ontario. She was previously the children's book editor for the Canadian publishing company, James Lorimer & Co., and has worked as a bookseller, publicist, reviewer, and library coordinator of the Canadian Children's Book Center. Dyer was also a president of the Canadian Section of the International Board on Books for Young People. She has also written for magazines such as Canadian Family, OWL, and Toronto Life. She is currently the executive editor of children's books for HarperCollins Canada. She also currently writes the column "Live Better" for The Globe and Mail and teaches publishing at Ryerson University.

== Awards and nominations ==
Award	Result
Canadian Library Association Book of the Year for Children Award	Won
Canadian Library Association Young Adult Book Award	Honourable Mention
CBC Radio's Young Canada Reads	Won
TD Canadian Children's Literature Award	Finalist
Hackmatack Award	Finalist
Red Maple Award	Finalist
Rocky Mountain Book Award	Finalist
Red Cedar Award	Finalist
