= Murdo Scribe =

Canadian veteran (1920–1983)

- Born: Murdock Scribe; 1920; Norway House, Manitoba
- Died: 1983 (aged 62–63)
- Citizenship: Swampy Cree
- Occupations: Author and educator

Murdo Scribe (1920 – 1983) was a Swampy Cree, World War II veteran and educator from Norway House, Manitoba, Canada. He recorded his stories and some of the legends that had been passed to him.

== Career ==
After the Second World War, Murdo returned home to Manitoba and resumed his life as a trapper, gardener, businessman, band councillor and storyteller.

Scribe was appointed to co-ordinate the Traditional Individualized Education (TIE) Program with the Aboriginal Education Directorate (formerly known as the Native Education Branch) of Manitoba Education, in 1975.

Throughout his life Murdo created various works that were published through the Manitoba Ministry of Education. The work features topics pertaining to the indigenous way of life such as canoe freighting, trapping and sledding. Most of these works were published in English as well as Cree.

Scribe also wrote Murdo's Story, the text of a children's picture book published in 1985, which is available in Cree and Ojibwe as well as English. Murdo's Story was illustrated by Terry Gallagher. Gallagher won a 1985 Canada Council Children's Literature Prize, now the Governor General's Award for English-language children's illustration.

== Legacy ==
The Murdo Scribe Centre opened on June 14, 2005, located at 510 Selkirk Ave, Winnipeg, Manitoba. It was named in honor of the Murdock "Murdo" Scribe in recognition of his contributions to Aboriginal education in the province of Manitoba. The centre houses the Aboriginal Education Directorate, part of Higher education in Manitoba.

== Works ==
- Scribe, Murdo. Canoe Freighting in the North. Winnipeg: Native Education Branch, Manitoba Department of Education, (1979?).
- a short booklet about canoe freighting at Norway House in the 1920s and 1930s
- Scribe, Murdo. Life on the Trapline. Winnipeg: Native Education Branch, Manitoba Department of Education, (1979?).
- Scribe remembers going on the trapline with his uncle in 1941/1942.
- Scribe, Murdo. Trail Blazers of the North. Winnipeg: Native Education Branch, Manitoba Department of Education, (1979?).
- life at Norway House from the 1930s to the 1970s.
- Scribe, Murdo. Murdo's Memoirs: The Early Days in Northern Manitoba. Winnipeg: Native Education Branch, Manitoba Department of Education, 1983.
- a compilation of Trail Blazers of the North, Life on the Trapline, and Canoe Freighting in the North
- More Than A Marathon. Scribe, Murdo. Winnipeg: Manitoba Education, Media Productions, c1985. 1 videorecording (20 min.)
- the story of Amos Colon, a sled-dog runner who ran more than a marathon a day to deliver mail and supplies to isolated communities, as told by his grandson.
- Murdo's Story: A Legend From Northern Manitoba. Illustrated by Terry Gallagher. Winnipeg, MB: Pemmican Publications, 1985. ISBN 0-919143-07-5. CIP.
- Tells the story of how Fischer became a constellation (the big dipper) and how the animals divided the season
