= Renata Liwska =

Children's book author and illustrator

- Occupations: Children's book author and illustrator
- Writing career
- Years active: 2005-present
- Website: randmcollective.com/renataliwska

Renata Liwska is a children's book author and illustrator.

Liwska began as a children's book illustrator. She published her first book, Barbara M. Joosse's Nikolai The Only Bear, in 2005. She has since illustrated over twenty children's books, working with authors such as Doreen Cronin and Mac Barnett. Her illustrations have been finalists for the Governor General's Award for English-language children's illustration (2010, 2011, 2014), E. B. White Read Aloud Award (2011), and Washington State Book Award.

She published her first authored book, Little Panda, in 2008. Her other authored books are Red Wagon (2011) and The Little Book of Big What If's (2019). Red Wagon was a finalist for the 2011 Governor General's Award for English-language children's illustration.

As of 2014, Liwska taught at the Alberta College of Art & Design.

Although Liwska grew up in Warsaw, as of 2026, she lives in Calgary.

== Awards and honours ==
In 2010, The New York Times included Deborah Underwood's The Quiet Book, which Liwska illustrated, on their yearly list of Notable Children's Books.

Awards for Liwska's work
Year	Work	Award	Result	Ref.
2010	The Quiet Book	Governor General's Award for English-language children's illustration	Finalist	
2011	The Quiet Book	E. B. White Read Aloud Award for Picture Books	Honor	
2011	Red Wagon	Governor General's Award for English-language children's illustration	Finalist	
2014	Once Upon a Memory	Governor General's Award for English-language children's illustration	Finalist	
2014	Once Upon a Memory	Washington State Book Award for Picture Book	Finalist	

== Publications ==
- Joosse, Barbara (2005). Nikolai The Only Bear. Illustrated by Renata Liwska. Philomel.
- Liwska, Renata (2008). Little Panda. HMH Books for Young Readers.
- Cuffe-Perez, Mary (2008). Skylar. Illustrated by Renata Liwska. Philomel.
- Underwood, Deborah (2010). The Quiet Book. Illustrated by Renata Liwska. HMH Books for Young Readers.
- Liwska, Renata (2011). Red Wagon. Philomel.
- Underwood, Deborah (2011). The Loud Book. Illustrated by Renata Liwska. HMH Books for Young Readers.
- Underwood, Deborah (2012). The Christmas Quiet Book. Illustrated by Renata Liwska. HMH Books for Young Readers.
- Laden, Nina (2013). Once Upon a Memory. Illustrated by Renata Liwska. Little, Brown, and Co.
- Brown, Margaret Wise (2014). Goodnight Songs. Illustrated by Jonathan Bean, Carin Berger, Sophie Blackall, Linda Bleck, Renata Liwska, Christopher Silas Neal, Zachariah O'Hora, Eric Puybaret, Sean Qualls, Isabel Roxas, Melissa Sweet, and Dan Yaccarino. Sterling.
- Cronin, Doreen (2014). Boom Snot Twitty. Illustrated by Renata Liwska. Viking Books for Young Readers.
- Cronin, Doreen (2015). Boom Snot Twitty This Way That Way. Illustrated by Renata Liwska. Viking Books for Young Readers.
- Arnold, Marsha Diane (2016). Waiting For Snow. Illustrated by Renata Liwska. HMH Books for Young Readers.
- Barnett, Mac (2017). Places To Be. Illustrated by Renata Liwska. Balzar + Bray.
- Wilson, Karma (2017). Dormouse Dreams. Illustrated by Renata Liwska. Disney Hyperion.
- Kerr, Mike (2018). Crafty Llama. Illustrated by Renata Liwska. Bloomsbury.
- Liwska, Renata (2019). The Little Book of Big What If's. Raincoast Books.
- Kerr, Mike (2021). Love is for Roaring. Illustrated by Renata Liwska. Bloomsbury.
- Gross, Kelsey E. (2023). Winter: A Solstice Story. Illustrated by Renata Liwska. Paula Wiseman Books.
- Hest, Amy (2024). Bunny Should Be Sleeping. Illustrated by Renata Liwska. Neal Porter Books.
- Gross, Kelsey E. (2024). Summer: A Solstice Story. Illustrated by Renata Liwska. Simon & Schuster.
- Gross, Kelsey E. (2026). Fall: A Seasons Story. Illustrated by Renata Liwska. Simon & Schuster.
