= Oleg Lipchenko =

Canadian artist and illustrator (born 1957)

- Born: 13 July 1957 (age 69); Ukraine
- Website: lipchenko.com

Oleg Yurievich Lipchenko (Ukrainian: Олег Юрійович Липченко; born 13 July 1957) is a Canadian artist and illustrator. He is a member of CANSCAIP.

He was born in Ukraine and moved to Toronto, Ontario in 1999. He studied Art at Art School in Poltava, Ukraine. He studied Art and Architecture at Poltava Technical University, gaining a Master of Architecture degree. Oleg Lipchenko currently lives in Toronto, Ontario.

== Awards ==
Oleg Lipchenko won the 2009 Elizabeth Mrazik-Cleaver Canadian Picture Book Award for his illustrations to the edition of Alice's Adventures in Wonderland, published by Studio Treasure and Tundra Books.
