= Claude Aubry =

Canadian library administrator and writer

Claude Bernard Aubry (October 23, 1914 – November 3, 1984) was a Canadian library administrator and author.

He was born in Morin-Heights and was educated at the Collège Sainte-Marie de Montréal. He worked for a Montreal trust company and then went on to study library science at McGill University. Aubry became personnel manager at the Montreal Public Library in 1945. In 1949, he was named Assistant Chief Librarian for the Ottawa Public Library. Aubry was chief librarian for the Ottawa library from 1953 until his retirement in 1979.

He was a member of the Association France-Canada and served as president of the Ottawa Library Association. In 1974, Aubry was named to the Order of Canada. He was also named to the French Ordre international du Bien Public. In 1981, IBBY Canada established the Claude Aubry award in his honour.

Aubry's books were translated into various languages including English, Chinese and Romanian. He also translated books by Brian Doyle and James Archibald Houston into French.

Aubry died in Montreal at the age of 70.

== Selected works ==
- La Vengeance des hommes de bonne volonté, children's literature (1944), received an award from the Quebec Département de l'Instruction publique, republished as Le loup de Noël
- Les îles du roi Maha Maha II, children's literature, received the prize for youth literature from the Association canadienne d'éducation de langue française
