= Jan Hudson =

Canadian writer (1954–1990)

Janis "Jan" Mary Hudson (April 27, 1954 – April 22, 1990) was a Canadian writer.

The daughter of Laurence and Mary Wiedrick, she was born Janis Mary Wiedrick in Calgary, Alberta and grew up in Edmonton. During her high school years, Hudson spent a short time in Eugene, Oregon, where she was encouraged in her writing by an English and drama teacher there. She received a BA in English from the University of Calgary and a law degree from the University of Alberta. She became interested in Alberta's history while taking a course about First Nations treaties in western Canada.

Hudson finished her manuscript for Sweetgrass in 1979. Although American publishers were not interested, the work placed second in the Alberta Writing for Young People competition. It was published in 1984 by Tree Frog Press, a small publishing company. It received the Canadian Library Association Book of the Year for Children Award and the Canada Council Children's Literature Prize. After it was released in the United States five years later, it was named Best Book for Young Adults by the American Library Association and received the Parents' Choice Award.

In 1990, Hudson published a second work of historical fiction Dawn Rider. It received the R. Ross Annett Award for Children's Literature.

She died in Edmonton at the age of 35 from sudden respiratory failure brought on by viral pneumonia.
