= Eric Beddows =

Canadian artist and illustrator

Ken Eric Nutt
- Born: November 29, 1951 (age 74); Woodstock, Ontario, Canada
- Education: York University
- Writing career
- Pen name: Eric Beddows
- Notable work: Joyful Noise: Poems for Two Voices

Ken Eric Nutt (born November 29, 1951), who uses the pen name Eric Beddows, is a Canadian artist and illustrator of children's books. His pseudonym combines his middle name with his mother's maiden name. He has used it for his illustrative work since 1986 to distinguish it from his work as an artist.

Beddows was born in Woodstock, Ontario and studied fine arts at York University from 1970 to 1972. He moved to Stratford, Ontario and worked various jobs at a gallery there.

His art has been shown at Gallery Stratford, the Woodstock Art Gallery and the Art Gallery of Windsor.

== Awards and honors ==
In 1992, Beddows was nominated for IBBY's Hans Christian Andersen Award for Illustrator.

Awards for
| Year | Title | Award | Result | Ref. |
|---|---|---|---|---|
| 1983 | Zoom at Sea | IODE Jean Throop Award | Winner | |
| 1984 | Zoom at Sea | Amelia Frances Howard-Gibbon Illustrator's Award | Winner | |
| 1984 | Zoom at Sea | Ruth and Sylvia Schwartz Children’s Book Award | Winner | |
| 1986 | Zoom Away | Amelia Frances Howard-Gibbon Illustrator's Award | Winner | |
| 1988 | The Emperor’s Panda | International Board on Books for Young People | Honour | |
| 1989 | Joyful Noise | Newbery Medal | Winner | |
| 1989 | Night Cars | IODE Jean Throop Award | Winner | |
| 1989 | Night Cars | Elizabeth Mrazik-Cleaver Canadian Picture Book Award | Winner | |
| 1992 | Zoom Upstream | Governor General's Award for English-language children's illustration | Finalist | |
| 1997 | The Rooster's Gift | ALSC Notable Children's Books | Selection | |
| 1996 | The Rooster's Gift | Governor General's Award for English-language children's illustration | Winner | |

== Publications ==
- Zoom at Sea, text by Tim Wynne-Jones (1983)
- Zoom Away, text by Tim Wynne-Jones (1985)
- The Emperor's Panda, text by David Day (1986)
- The Cave of Snores, text by Dennis Haseley (1987)
- Joyful Noise: Poems for Two Voices, poetry by Paul Fleischman (1988)
- Night Cars, text by Teddy Jam (1989)
- Shadow Play, text by Paul Fleischman (1990)
- Who Shrank My Grandmother's House? Poems of Discovery, text by Barbara Esbensen (1992)
- Teller of Tales, text by William J. Brooke (1995)
- The Rooster's Gift, text by Pam Conrad (1996)
- Changing Planes: Stories, text by Ursula K. Le Guin (2003)
- Toes, text by Tor Seidler (2004)
