= Ann Pilling =

English author and poet

- Born: 17 October 1944 (age 81); Warrington, England
- Education: King's College London
- Occupations: Author and poet
- Writing career
- Pen name: Ann Cheetham
- Notable awards: Guardian Children's Fiction Prize (1986)

Ann Pilling (born 17 October 1944) is an English author and poet best known for young adult fiction. She has also written horror fiction under the pen name Ann Cheetham.

For Henry's Leg, published by Viking Kestrel in 1985, she won the annual Guardian Children's Fiction Prize, a once-in-a-lifetime book award judged by a panel of British children's writers.

Pilling was born in Warrington, Lancashire, and grew up in a house "groaning with books". She started writing poetry when she was eight. At twelve years old, she took herself to church because 'I had a strong sense of God'. Her religious faith is important to her but she more often chooses secular subjects. She studied English at King's College London and wrote a Master's thesis on C. S. Lewis., her first introduction to contemporary children's books.

== Works ==
=== Horror stories ===
The first four books (Dark Powers series) were originally published as by Ann Cheetham.

- Black Harvest (1983)
- The Beggar's Curse (1984)
- The Witch of Lagg (1985)
- The Pit (1987)
- The Empty Frame (1997)

=== Children's books ===
- The Year of the Worm (1984)
- Henry's Leg (1985)
- The Friday Parcel (1986)
- No Guns No Oranges (1986)
- Our Best Stories (1986), eds. Pilling and A. Wood
- The Big Pink (1987)
- The Beast in the Basement (1988)
- Dustbin Charlie (1988)
- On the Lion's Side (1988)
- Stan (1988)
- The Big Biscuit (1989)
- The Jungle Sale (1989)
- Our Kid (1989)
- Getting Rid of Aunt Mildred (1990)
- The Donkey's Day Out (1990)
- Before I Go to Sleep: Bible Stories, Poems, and Prayers for Children, selected and retold, illustrated by Kady MacDonald Denton (London: Kingfisher, New York: Crown Publishers, Toronto: Kids Can Press, 1990); reissued 2000 as A Kingfisher Treasury of Bible Stories, Poems and Prayers for Bedtime OCLC 59564291
- The Boy with His Leg in the Air (1991)
- Vote for Baz (1992)
- Considering Helen (1993)
- 'Dustbin Charlie Cleans Up' (1994)
- The Kingfisher Children's Bible: Stories from the Old and New Testaments, retold, illus. Denton (2003); reissued 2003 as The Kingfisher Book of Bible Stories OCLC 53072371
- Realms of Gold: Myths and Legends from Around the World, retold, illus. Denton (1993); reissued 2003 as The Kingfisher Treasury of Myths and Legends OCLC 52470749
- The Baked Bean Kids (1993)
- Mother's Daily Scream (1995)
- The Life of Jesus (1996)
- Noah's Ark (1996)
- Amber's Secret (2000)
- Why Bear Has a Stumpy Tail and Other Creation Stories (2000)
- The Catnappers: The Mystery of the Disappearing Cat (Collins, 2003), as by Ann Cheetham, illus. Clare Mackie OCLC 51107280

=== Adult books ===
- A Broken Path (1991)
- Considering Helen (1993)

=== Poetry ===
- 'Growing Pains' (2008, winner of Smith/Doorstop Pamphlet Competition)
- 'Home Field' (2008) Arrowhead Press
- 'The Dancing Sailors' ( 2011) Indigo Dreams Publishing
- 'Ground Cover' (2015) Indigo Dreams Publishing
- 'Ways of Speech' ( 2020) Shoestring Press
- In Flight' ( 2024 ) Mudfog Press

== Awards ==
- 1986 Guardian Children's Fiction Prize for Henry's Leg.

Her 1988 children's books On the Lion's Side and Stan were shortlisted for the Carnegie Medal.
