= Marie-Louise Gay =

Canadian illustrator and children's writer (born 1952)

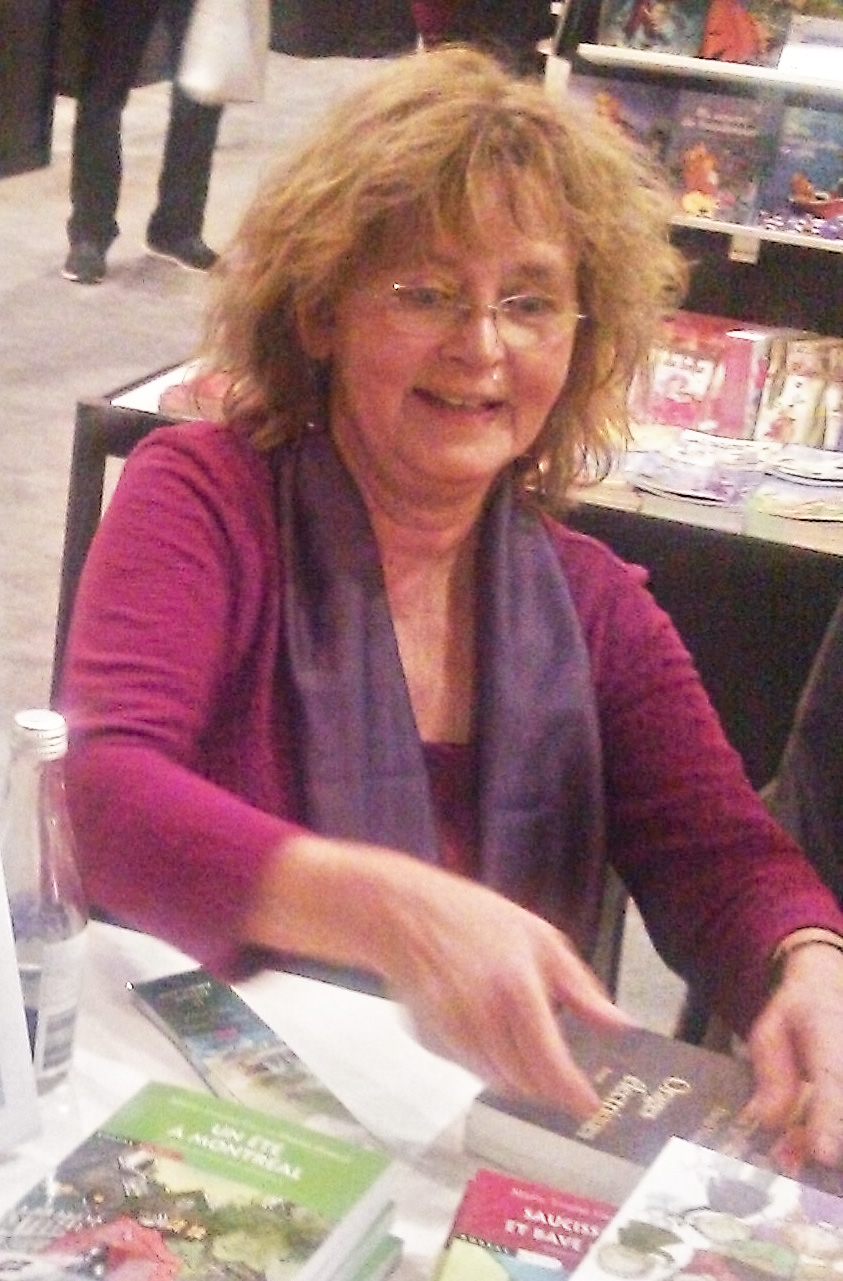
- Gay at the Salon du livre de Montréal 2016 in Montreal Canada
- Born: June 17, 1952 (age 74); Quebec City, Quebec, Canada
- Occupations: Illustrator, writer
- Spouse: David Homel
- Writing career
- Language: English, French
- Genres: Picture books, children's literature

Marie-Louise Gay (born June 17, 1952) is a Canadian children's writer and illustrator. She has received numerous awards for her written and illustrated works in both French and English, including the 2005 Vicky Metcalf Award, multiple Governor General's Awards, and multiple Janet Savage Blachford Prizes, among others.

== Biography ==
Gay was born in Quebec City and lived in Montreal and Vancouver as a child. She lives in Montreal.

Gay co-wrote two longer books with her husband, Montreal novelist and translator David Homel, which included her black-and-white illustrations: Travels With My Family (2006) and On the Road Again! (2008). At the time, she said, "For the last twenty-five years, I have mainly been writing, illustrating and creating only for children."

Gay's books received renewed attention after a public school library system in Alabama mistakenly flagged Read Me A Story, Stella as potentially inappropriate for children, because of her surname.

== Awards and honours ==
In 2013, Canada Post released a series of stamps featuring Gay's character Stella.

Awards for Gay's writing
Year	Title	Award	Result	Ref.
1984	Lizzy's Lion by Dennis Lee	Canada Council Children's Literature Prize	Winner	
1984	Drôle d'école	Canada Council Children's Literature Prize	Winner	
1987	Moonbeam On A Cat's Ear	Amelia Frances Howard-Gibbon Illustrator's Award	Winner	
1987	Rainy Day Magic	Governor General's Award for English-language children's illustration	Winner	
1988	Angel and the Polar Bear	Governor General's Award for English-language children's illustration	Shortlist	
1988	Rainy Day Magic	Amelia Frances Howard-Gibbon Illustrator's Award	Winner	
1995	Berthold et Lucrèce	Governor General's Award for French-language children's illustration	Shortlist	
2000	Sur mon île	Governor General's Award for French-language children's illustration	Shortlist	
2000	Yuck, A Love Story	Governor General's Award for English-language children's illustration	Winner	
2001	Stella: Queen of the Snow	Elizabeth Mrazik-Cleaver Canadian Picture Book Award	Winner	
2002	Stella, Fairy of the Forest	Governor General's Award for English-language children's illustration	Shortlist	
2005		Vicky Metcalf Award	Winner	
2006	Caramba	Ruth and Sylvia Schwartz Children's Book Award for Children's Picture Book	Winner	
2006	Caramba	Marilyn Baillie Picture Book Award	Winner	
2007	Houndsley and Catina	ALSC Notable Children's Books	Selection	
2007	Stella étoile de la mer	Mr. Christie's Book Award for French: 7 and under	Winner	
2009	When Stella Was Very, Very Small	Janet Savage Blachford Prize	Shortlist	
2009		Astrid Lindgren Memorial Award	Longlist	
2010	When Stella was Very, Very Small	Canadian Booksellers Association Libris Award for Children's Picture Book	Winner	
2010	When Stella Was Very, Very Small	Ruth and Sylvia Schwartz Children's Book Awards	Shortlist	
2011	Roslyn Rutabaga and the Biggest Hole on Earth!	Amelia Frances Howard-Gibbon Illustrator's Award	Winner	
2011	Roslyn Rutabaga and the Biggest Hole on Earth!	Forest of Reading: Blue Spruce Award	Shortlist	
2014	Any Questions?	Amelia Frances Howard-Gibbon Illustrator's Award	Winner	
2014	Any Questions?	Janet Savage Blachford Prize	Shortlist	
2014	Any Questions?	Governor General's Award for English-language children's illustration	Shortlist	
2014	Read Me a Story, Stella	Ruth and Sylvia Schwartz Children's Book Award for Children's Picture Book	Finalist	
2015	Any Questions?	Amelia Frances Howard-Gibbon Award	Winner	
2015	Any Questions?	CBC Fan Choice Award	Winner	
2015	Any Questions?	TD Canadian Children's Literature Award	Finalist	
2017	Short Stories for Little Monsters	Governor General's Award for Young People's Literature - Illustrated Books	Finalist	
2018	Mustafa	Elizabeth Mrazik-Cleaver Canadian Picture Book Award	Finalist	
2019	Mustafa	Ruth and Sylvia Schwartz Children's Book Award for Children's Picture Book	Finalist	
2019	Mustafa	TD Canadian Children's Literature Award	Shortlist	
2020	Fern and Horn	Janet Savage Blachford Prize	Shortlist	
2020	Mustafa	Forest of Reading Award	Shortlist	
2020	The Three Brothers	Elizabeth Mrazik-Cleaver Canadian Picture Book Award	Winner	
2020	The Three Brothers	Janet Savage Blachford Prize	Winner	
2022	I’m Not Sydney	Janet Savage Blachford Prize	Shortlist	

== Publications ==
=== Stella and Sam series ===
Gay's Stella and Sam books have been published in more than twelve languages. They spawned a 52-episode cartoon series in 2013 that aired on Sprout and Family Junior.

==== Stella series ====
- Stella, Star of the Sea (1999)
- Stella, Queen of the Snow (2001)
- Stella, Fairy of the Forest (2002)
- Stella, Princess of the Sky (2004)
- When Stella Was Very, Very, Small (2009)
- Read Me A Story, Stella (2013)

==== Sam series ====
Sam is Stella's younger brother

- Good Morning, Sam (2003)
- Good Night, Sam (2003)
- What Are You Doing, Sam? (2006)

==== Travels with My Family series ====
The Travels with My Family series was co-written with David Homel.

- Travels With My Family (Groundwood, 2006)
- On the Road Again! (Groundwood, 2008)
- Summer in the City (Groundwood, 2012)
- The Traveling Circus (Groundwood, 2015)
- Travels in Cuba (Groundwood, 2021)

=== Standalone books authored ===
- Lizzy's Lion (1984)
- The Garden: Little Big Books (1985)
- Moonbeam On A Cat's Ear (1986)
- Rainy Day Magic (1987)
- Angel and the Polar Bear (1988)
- Fat Charlie's Circus (1989)
- Willy Nilly (1990)
- Mademoiselle Moon (1992)
- Rabbit Blue (1993)
- Midnight Mimi (1994)
- Qui a peur de Loulou? (Who's afraid of Loulou?) (Montreal: VLB Editeur, 1994), 111pp, "Theatre for children"
- The Three Little Pigs (Canadian Fairy Tales Series) (1994)
- Rumplestiltskin (1997)
- Sur Mon Ile (1999)
- Caramba (2006)
- Roslyn Rutabaga and the Biggest Hole on Earth! (2010)
- Caramba and Henry (2011)
- Any Questions (2014)
- Short Stories for Little Monsters (2017)
- The Three Brothers (2020)

=== Books illustrated only ===
- The Last Piece (1993)
- When Vegetables Go Bad! (1993)
- The Fabulous Song (1996)
- Dreams Are More Real Than Bathtubs (1999)
- Yuck, a Love Story (2000)
- Didi and Daddy on the Promenade (2001)
- Houndsley and Catina (2006)
- Maddie series; Sophie series (1993–2003)
