= Jean E. Pendziwol =

Canadian writer of children's literature (born 1965)

Jean E. Pendziwol (born 1965) is a Canadian writer of children's literature from Thunder Bay, Ontario. She is most noted for her book Skating Wild on an Inland Sea, which was the winner of both the Governor General's Award for English-language Young People's Literature - Illustrated Books at the 2024 Governor General's Awards, and the 2024 TD Canadian Children's Literature Award.

Her book Once Upon a Northern Night was previously nominated for the Governor General's Award for English-language children's literature at the 2013 Governor General's Awards, and for the TD Children's Literature award in 2014.

She has also published one adult novel, The Lightkeeper's Daughters.

== Works ==
=== Children's literature ===
- No Dragons for Tea - 1999
- Dawn Watch - 2004
- The Red Sash - 2005
- Once Upon a Dragon - 2006
- Marja's Skis - 2007
- Once Upon a Northern Light - 2013
- Me and You and the Red Canoe - 2017
- I Found Hope in a Cherry Tree - 2020
- When I Listen to Silence - 2022
- Skating Wild on an Inland Sea - 2023
- The Best Emma Ever - 2025

=== Adult fiction ===
- The Lightkeeper's Daughters - 2017
