= Gary Clement =

Canadian artist, illustrator and writer

- Born: Gary Clement; July 1959 (age 67); Toronto, Ontario, Canada
- Occupations: Artist, illustrator, cartoonist, writer
- Writing career
- Period: 1990s–present
- Notable works: Just Stay Put; The Great Poochini
- Website: garyclement.ca

Gary Clement (born July 1959) is a Canadian artist, illustrator and writer living in Toronto, Ontario.

Clement is the daily political cartoonist for Canada's National Post in Toronto since the newspaper's launch in 1998. His illustration work has appeared in magazines and newspapers including Mother Jones, The Wall Street Journal, The New York Times, Time, The Guardian, and The National (Abu Dhabi). His work has been selected for American Illustration on numerous occasions.

His second children's picture book, The Great Poochini, received the Governor General's Award for Children's Literature Illustration in 1999. In 2007 one of his cartoons was a Top 10 selection by Time and his work has frequently appeared in The Sunday New York Times Week in Review section.

He was nominated for the Governor General's Award for the books "Just Stay Put", which he also wrote, and "Oy Feh So?" written by Cary Fagan.

He has illustrated children's books by a number of other writers.

Clement also paints and draws. His art is represented in Toronto by Dianna Witte Gallery. https://diannawitte.com/artists.php

== Selected works ==
As writer and illustrator

- Just Stay Put: A Chelm Story (Folk & Fairytales), (Groundwood Books, 1996) – finalist, Governor General's Award for Illustration
- The Great Poochini, (Groundwood, 1999) – winner, Governor General's Award for Children's Book Illustration
- "Swimming, Swimming" (Groundwood, 2015)

As illustrator only

- Get Growing!: How the Earth Feeds Us, (Groundwood, 1991), by Candace Savage
- Stories from Adam and Eve to Ezekiel: Retold from the Bible, (Groundwood, 2004), by Celia Barker Lottridge
- One-Eye! Two-Eyes! Three-Eyes!: A Very Grimm Fairy Tale, (Simon & Schuster, 2006), by Aaron Shepard
- Ten Old Men and a Mouse, (Tundra Books, 2007), by Cary Fagan
- A Coyote Solstice Tale, (Groundwood, 2009), by Thomas King
- "Oy Feh So?", (Groundwood, 2013) by Cary Fagan
- "The Hockey Song", (Greystone Books), by Stompin' Tom Connors
- "My Winter City"' (Groundwood, 2019) by James Gladstone
