= Wallace Edwards =

Canadian children's author and illustrator

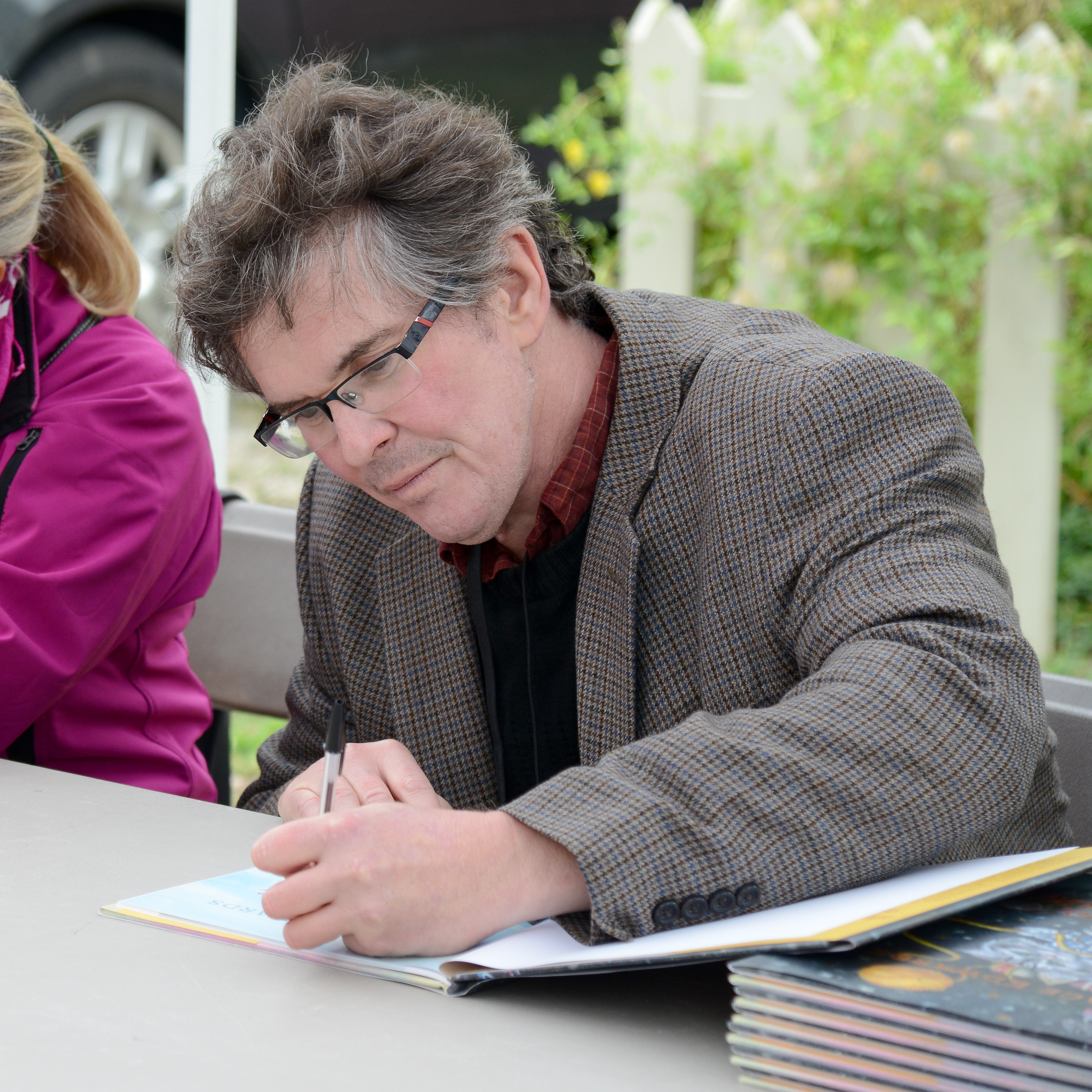
- Edwards at the Eden Mills Writers' Festival in 2015
- Born: Wallace Strachan Edwards; September 20, 1957; Ottawa, Ontario, Canada.
- Died: December 25, 2022 (aged 65); Kingston, Ontario , Canada.
- Education: Ontario College of Art
- Known for: Illustration

Wallace Edwards was a Canadian children’s author and illustrator whose imagination transformed the world of animals and strange creatures for a generation of children. His illustrations don't condescend to children, they engage the imagination on multiple levels, blending childhood whimsy with adult sophistication."

A Canadian illustrator and writer who won the 2002 Governor General's Award for his first children's book Alphabeasts., Edwards was also the recipient of a multitude of awards and short lists, the Gold Medal from ForeWord Magazine’s Book of the Year Award, and the Children’s Choice Award from the International Reading Association for Alphabeasts; the Ruth and Sylvia Schwartz Children’s Book Award, The Amelia Frances Howard-Gibbon Illustrator’s Award, the Children’s Choice Award from the International Reading Association for Monkey Business; the Canadian Library Association’s Honour for Mixed Beasts; and the Junior Library Guild Award for The Cat’s Pajamas.

Born in Ottawa, Ontario, Edwards was a graduate of the Ontario College of Art, and his work can be found in numerous public and private collections. He also worked widely with Metro Toronto Zoo, the City of Toronto, the B.C. Ministry of the Environment, the Canadian Children’s Book Centre, the Canadian Wildlife Federation, and various magazines. (https://quillandquire.com/authors/call-of-the-wild/

On October 16, 2007, Wallace Edwards was nominated for the Governor General's Award for illustrating The Painted Circus. Edwards wrote and illustrated fifteen published books, of which three have been nominated for this, Canada's most prestigious literary award.

His art has been described as “Curious and witty, sophisticated and highly original in approach…” resulting in work which is “visually pleasing as well as mentally stimulating” (taken from the Canada Council for the Arts web site). His children’s books have been reviewed in the Quill and Quire, the Globe and Mail, the Toronto Star, Macleans, the Christian Science Monitor, the National Post, the Detroit Free Press, the Chicago Tribune, the LA Times, the Washington Post, and the School Library Journal, among others.

Edwards was also a pioneering artist in virtual and augmented reality. In 2013 he was the Canada Council supported Artist-in-Residence at York University's Future Cinema Lab where he first began to create augmented and immersive materials. He went on to create work in virtual and augmented reality exhibited at the international Electronic Literature Organization conferences in Portugal, Canada and Italy.

Edwards lived in Yarker, Ontario, Canada, and died on December 25, 2022, in Kingston, Ontario, at the age of 65.

== Books ==
As writer and illustrator:

- Alphabeasts
- Monkey Business (2004)
- The Extinct Files: My Science Project (2009)
- Cat's pyjamas (2010) "Many young readers are (rightly) allergic to anything that can be described as “exquisite,” but there's no better word for The Cat’s Pajamas."
- The painted circus : P.T. Vermin presents a mesmerizing menagerie of trickery and illusion guaranteed to beguile and bamboozle the beholder! (Toronto: Kids Can Press, 2007), LCCN 2010-497053
- Uncle Wally's Old Brown Shoe (Vancouver: Orca Book Publishers, 2012)
- Mixed Beasts (2013)
- Unnatural Selections (Orca, 2014) "What makes Unnatural Selections so magnificent is the attention to detail. Like celebrated Australian author-illustrator Graeme Base (Animalia), Edwards creates richly layered scenes bursting with multiple components. Beyond the mythical animals featured in the foreground, readers are encouraged by a reference section at the book’s end to go back and hunt for additional creatures hidden throughout. Hours can be spent poring over every inch of each page, unearthing elements previously unnoticed. In the peripheries live Snailagators, Dorses, Snirds, and even a Frogtopus. No doubt, many readers will delight in searching for these unusual hybrids, but Edwards’ greatest triumph is his ability to encourage us all to discover the strange and wonderful beasts that already dwell in our own imaginations."
- Once Upon a Line (2015)
- What is Peace? (Peace Quest, 2016)
- Woodrow at Sea (2018) "What's most surprising about Woodrow at Sea is that it's by Wallace Edwards, the beloved Governor General’s Literary Award–winner known for his intricate wordplay and illustrations. With this book, Edwards is moving in a different direction, foregoing his rich, deep-coloured palette for one much brighter, and embracing simplicity in his drawings rather than detail and subtext. Fans will miss his unique voice and style – not to mention witty rhymes – but taken on its own, Woodrow at Sea is a delight." "Wallace describes the narrative arc of this latest book as the Odyssey, much distilled. "It's a very simple version of the hero's tale, where my elephant protagonist sets off on an adventure, meets a fellow traveller, and finds himself in a situation where each one saves the other."
- Do you Wonder? (2022)
- Pigs Can`t Fly (2023)
