= Cary Fagan =

Canadian writer

Cary Fagan (born 1957) is a Canadian writer of novels, short stories, and children's books. His novel, The Student, was a finalist for the Toronto Book Award and the Governor General's Literary Award. Previously a short-story collection, My Life Among the Apes, was longlisted for the Scotiabank Giller Prize and his widely praised adult novel, A Bird's Eye, was shortlisted for the 2013 Rogers Writers' Trust Fiction Prize. His novel Valentine's Fall was nominated for the 2010 Toronto Book Award. Since publishing his first original children's book in 2001, he has published 25 children's titles.

== Personal life ==
Fagan was born in 1957 in Toronto, Ontario. He grew up in the Toronto suburbs and attended the University of Toronto, graduating with a degree in English and winning eight student awards. He has lived for short periods in London and New York City, and now lives in Toronto. He is married to Rebecca Comay, a member of the philosophy department at the University of Toronto. He has two daughters, a step-son, and a step-daughter. Along with Bernard Kelly and Rebecca Comay, he co-publishes and edits a small press, called espresso.

Fagan has received a Toronto Book Award, two Jewish Book Awards, and a Mr Christie silver medal.

== Prizes and honours ==
- 1994 Jewish Book Award for Fiction (The Animals' Waltz)
- 2004 World Storytelling Award (U.S.) (The Market Wedding)
- 2009 Quill & Quire Book of the Year (Jacob Two-Two on the High Seas)
- )2012 IODE Jean Throop Book Award (Mr. Zinger's Hat
- 2013 Marilyn Baillie Picture Book Award (Mr. Zinger's Hat)
- 2014 Vicki Metcalf Award for Children's Literature (body of work)
- 2019 Joan Betty Stuchner—Oy Vey!--Funniest Children's Book Award (Mort Ziff is not Dead)
- 2022 Canadian Jewish Literary Award (Great Adventures for the Faint of Heart)
- 2023 Forward Silver Award for Humor (The Animals)
- 2023 Vine Award For Jewish Canadian Literature (Water, Water)
- 2026 IODE Violet Downey Award (Robot Island)

Runners-up, etc.

- 1990 Finalist, Toronto Book Awards (City Hall and Mrs. God)
- 2000 Sydney Taylor Honor Book (U.S.) (The Market Wedding)
- 2004 Silver Birch Award Honour Book (The Fortress of Kaspar Snit)
- 2008 Finalist, TD Canadian Children's Literature Award (Thing-Thing)
- 2008 Silver Birch Express Award Honour Book (Ten Lessons for Kaspar Snit)
- 2008 Finalist, Marilyn Baillie Picture Book Award (Thing-Thing)
- 2010 Finalist, Toronto Book Awards (Valentine's Fall)
- 2012 Longlist, Scotiabank Giller Prize (My Life Among the Apes)
- 2013 Finalist, Rogers Writers Trust Fiction Prize ("A Bird's Eye")
- 2015 Finalist, John Spray Mystery Award (The Show to End all Shows)
- 2019 Finalist, Toronto Book Award (The Student)
- 2019 Finalist, Governor General's Literary Award for Fiction (The Student)
- 2019 Finalist, Governor General's Literary Award for English-language Young People's Literature - Illustrated Books (King Mouse)
- 2026 Finalist, Ruth and Sylvia Schwartz Children's Book Award (Robot Island)

== Published books ==
=== Novels for adults ===
- The Animals' Waltz: A Novel (Lester & Orpen Dennys, 1994)
- Sleeping Weather (The Porcupine's Quill, 1997)
- Felix Roth (Stoddart Books, 1999)
- The Mermaid of Paris (Key Porter Books, 2003)
- Valentine's Fall (Cormorant Books, 2010)
- A Bird's Eye (House of Anansi Press, 2013)
- The Student (Freehand Books, 2019)
- The Animals (book*hug, 2022)

=== Children's fiction ===
- Gogol's Coat (Tundra Books, 1999), illustrated by Regolo Ricci, adapted from "The Overcoat" by Gogol
- The Market Wedding (Tundra, 2000), illus. Regolo Ricci, from Abraham Cahan
- Daughter of the Great Zandini (Tundra, 2001), illus. Cybèle Young
- Beyond the Dance: A Ballerina's Life (Tundra, 2002), by Fagan and Chan Hon Goh, autobiographical
- The Fortress of Kaspar Snit (Tundra, 2004), novel
- Ten Old Men and a Mouse (Tundra, 2007), illus. Gary Clement
- My New Shirt (Tundra, 2007), illus. Dušan Petričić
- Directed by Kaspar Snit (Tundra, 2007), sequel novel
- Mr. Karp's Last Glass (Tundra, 2007), illus. Selçuk Demirel
- Ten Lessons for Kaspar Snit (Tundra, 2008), sequel novel
- Thing-Thing (Tundra, 2008), illus. Nicolas Debon
- Jacob Two-Two on the High Seas (Tundra, 2009), illus. Dušan Petričić
- Book of Big Brothers (Groundwood Books, 2010), illus. Luc Melanson
- The Big Swim (Groundwood, 2010), novel
- Banjo of Destiny (Groundwood, 2011), illus. Selçuk Demirel
- Ella May and the Wishing Stone (Tundra, 2011), illus. Geneviève Côté
- Mr. Zinger's Hat (Tundra, 2012), illus. Dušan Petričić
- The Boy in the Box (Penguin Canada, 2012), novel; Master Melville's Medicine Show, book 1
- Danny, Who Fell in a Hole (Groundwood, 2013), illus. Milan Pavlovic
- Oy, Feh, So (Groundwood, 2013), illus. Gary Clement
- I Wish I Could Draw (Groundwood, 2014), "words and (bad) pictures by Cary Fagan", OCLC 881253673
- Little Blue Chair (Tundra, 2017), illus. Madelie Kloepper
- A Cage Went in Search of a Bird (Groundwood, 2017), illus. Banafsheh Erfanian
- Wolfie & Fly (Tundra, 2017), illus. Zoe Si
- Mort Ziff is Not Dead (Penguin Canada)
- What Are You Doing, Benny? (Tundra, 2019), illus. Kady MacDonald Denton
- The Collected Works of Gretchen Oyster (Tundra, 2019)
- King Mouse (Tundra, 2019), illus. Dena Seiferling
- Mr. Tempkin Climbs a Tree (Kar-Ben Publishing, 2019), illus. Carles Arbat
- Son of Happy (Groundwood, 2020), illus. Milan Pavlović
- Bear Wants to Sing (Tundra, 2021), illus. Dena Seiferling
- Water, Water (Tundra, 2022)
- Boney (Groundwood, 2022)
- Hans Christian Andersen Lives Next Door (Tundra, 2023)
- Robot Island (Tundra 2025

=== Short stories ===
- History Lessons (Hounslow, 1990)
- The Little Black Dress: tales from France (The Mercury Press, 1993)
- The Doctor's House and other Fiction (Stoddart, 2000)
- My Life Among the Apes (Cormorant, 2012)
- The Old World and Other Stories (Anansi, 2017)
- Great Adventures for the Faint of Heart (Freehand Books, 2021)
- A Fast Horse Never Brings Good News (Book*Hug, 2025)

=== Non-fiction ===
- City Hall and Mrs. God: A Passionate Journey Through a Changing Toronto (The Mercury Press, 1990)

=== As editor ===
- Streets of Attitude: Toronto stories (Toronto: Yonge & Bloor, 1990), OCLC 247188080
- A Walk by the Seine: Canadian poets on Paris (Windsor, ON: Black Moss Press, 1995), OCLC 635872651
