= William Toye (author) =

Canadian author and literary critic (1926–2024)

William Toye CM
- Born: William Eldred Toye; June 19, 1926
- Died: May 1, 2024 (aged 97); Toronto, Ontario, Canada
- Occupation: Author, editor, literary critic
- Period: 20th century
- Genre: Non-fiction; Children's literature

William Eldred Toye CM (June 19, 1926 – May 1, 2024) was a Canadian editor, author, and literary critic.

== Biography ==
Toye was born on June 19, 1926, and grew up in Toronto, Ontario. He graduated from the University of Toronto in 1948 where he majored in journalism. He obtained a job with the Canadian branch of Oxford University Press which at the time was nothing more than a desk in a warehouse. He worked at the job for the next 43 years and in 1969 became the Editorial Director. He retired in 1991 and continued with them on a freelance basis after that. Known for his astute editing abilities, he was one of the first people to usher in an expanded and flourishing Canadian publishing business. He was one of the founding editors of the Tamarack Review in 1956 which ended publication in 1982. The early work of many notable Canadian authors appeared in its pages.

Toye authored or edited several books including the Oxford Companion to Canadian Literature, the Oxford Anthology of Canadian Literature and A Book of Canada. He has written several children's books.

In 1993 he was made a member of the Order of Canada which said in its award that Toye "has been a highly regarded editor and publisher, well-liked by writers for his patience, fine judgement, tact and unerring taste. An award-winning children's author, he was also one of the founders of The Tamarack Review, where he was influential for many years in the development and encouragement of new Canadian talent."

Toye died in Toronto, Ontario on May 1, 2024, at the age of 97.

== Works ==
- A Picture History of Canada (1956) by Clarke Hutton [Contributor, also Ivon Owen]
- The St. Lawrence (1959)
- A Book of Canada (1962)
- The Mountain Goats of Temlaham (1969) with Elizabeth Cleaver
- How Summer Came to Canada (1969) with Elizabeth Cleaver
- Cartier discovers the St. Lawrence (1970)
- Supplement to the Oxford companion to Canadian history and literature (1973)
- Toronto (1975) by John de Visser [Contributor]
- Simon and the Golden Sword (1976) by Frank Newfeld [Contributor, also Kevin W. Macdonald]
- The Loon's Necklace (1977) with Elizabeth Cleaver
- The fire stealer (1979) with Elizabeth Cleaver
- The Oxford Anthology of Canadian literature (1981) with Robert Weaver
- The Oxford Companion to Canadian Literature (1983) with Eugene Benson, 2nd edition, 1997
- City light: a Portrait of Toronto (1983)
- Letters of Marshall Mcluhan, 1911-1980 (1987) with Corinne McLuhan & Mattie Molinaro
- The concise Oxford companion to Canadian literature (2001)
- William Toye on Canadian literature (2005)
