= Sheryl McFarlane =

Canadian author of books for children and young adults

- Sheryl McFarlane
- Born: January 20, 1954 (age 72); Pembroke, Renfrew County, Ontario, Canada
- Occupation: Author
- Writing career
- Genre: Children's Literature / Young Adult Fiction

Sheryl McFarlane is a Canadian author of books for children and young adults.

== Career ==
McFarlane was born in the Ottawa Valley, grew up in Arizona and has lived on the West Coast of Canada since 1974. A former teacher, McFarlane often visits schools and speaks at seminars across Canada on topics related to children's literature.

A graduate of the University of British Columbia, McFarlane received her B.Ed. in Science and Canadian Studies

Among her best selling children's books are Waiting for the Whales, A Pod of Orcas, Jessie's Island, This is the Dog and Eagle Dreams.

Her first young adult novel, The Smell of Paint, won a Moonbeam Award gold medal in the Young Adult category and was selected by the Canadian Children's Book Center as a 2007 best book of the year.

McFarlane lives in Victoria, British Columbia, Canada

== Bibliography ==
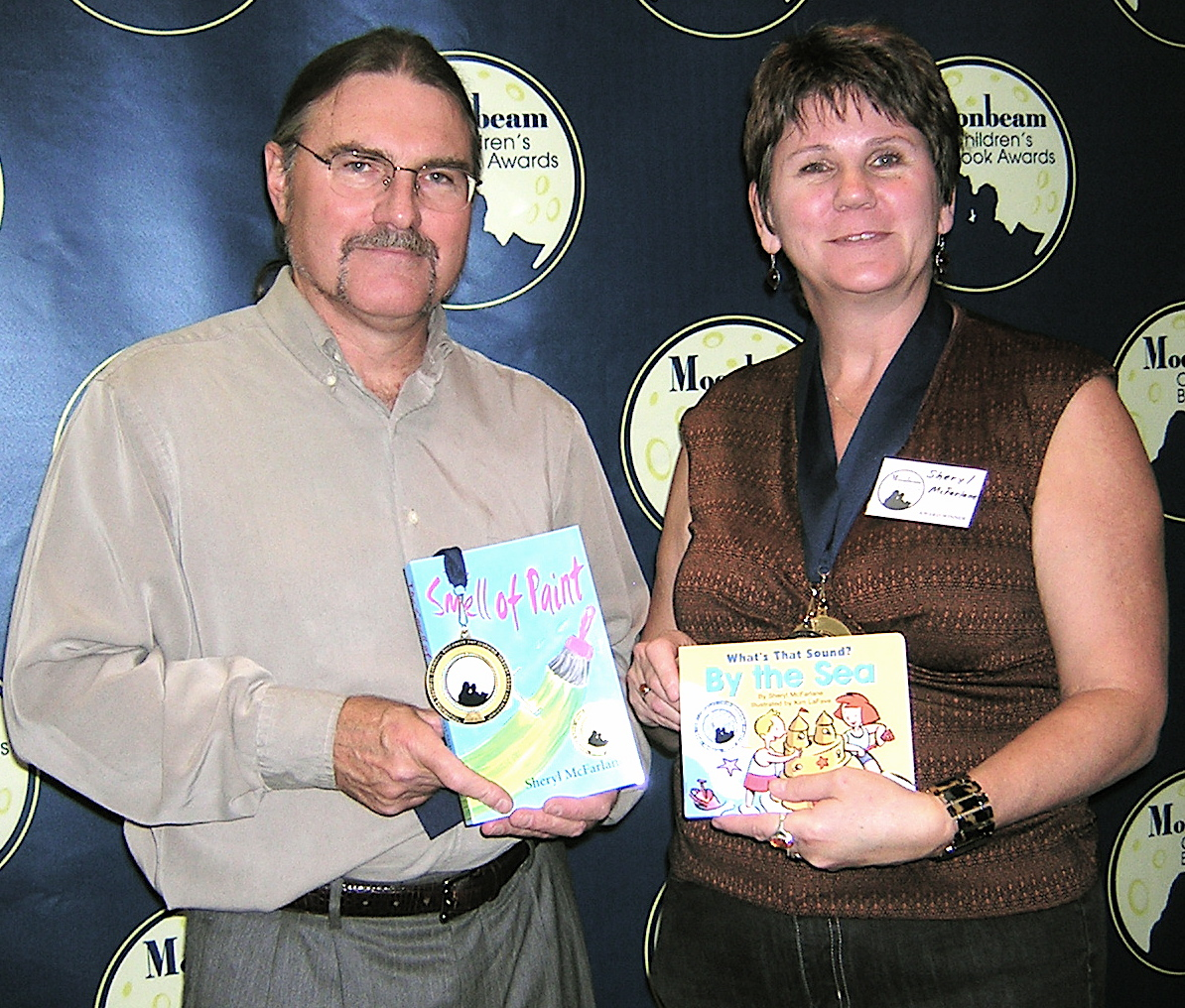
Jim Barnes and Sheryl McFarlane at the 2007 Moonbeam Awards

Novels

- The Smell of Paint: Fitzhenry & Whiteside, 2006.

Picture Books

- Island Santa: Orca Book Publishers, 2012
- This Is the Dog: Fitzhenry & Whiteside, 2004
- A Pod of Orcas: Fitzhenry & Whiteside, 2003
- Going to the Fair: Orca Book Publishers, 1996
- Tides of Change: Orca Book Publishers, 1995
- Eagle Dreams: Orca Book Publishers, 1994
- Moonsnail Song: Orca Book Publishers, 1994
- Jessie’s Island: Orca Book Publishers, 1992
- Waiting For the Whales: Orca Book Publishers, 1991

Board Books

- What’s That Sound? By the Sea: Fitzhenry & Whiteside, 2006
- What’s That Sound? At the Circus: Fitzhenry & Whiteside, 2006
- What’s That Sound? On the Farm: Fitzhenry & Whiteside, 2005
- What’s That Sound? In the City: Fitzhenry & Whiteside, 2005

== Awards and nominations ==
=== Waiting for the Whales ===
- Governor General's Award for Illustration
- IODE Award for Text
- Short-listed for Mr. Christie Award, BC Book Prize
- Recognized by Canadian Children's Book Centre, CBC Morningside Book Panel
- Canadian Library Notable Book

=== Eagle Dreams ===
- Recognized by CBC Morningside Book Panel

=== Tides of Change ===
- Recommended by the Royal British Columbia Museum

=== A Pod of Orcas ===
- Short-listed for the Chocolate Lily Award 2003/4
- BC Ministry of Education Ready Set Learn Title

=== This is the Dog ===
- Short-listed for the Blue Spruce Award,
- Short-listed for the Chocolate Lily Award 2004/5
- Short-listed for the Amelia Francis Howard-Gibbon Award
- Canadian Toy Council Recommended Title

=== What's That Sound? In the City in the City & What's That Sound? On the Farm ===
- Recognized by Today's Parent

=== What's That Sound? By the Sea ===
- 2008 Canadian Toy Testing Council Great Book Award
- 2007 Moonbeam Silver Medal Award in the Board Book Category (USA)

=== The Smell of Paint ===
- 2007 Moonbeam Gold Medal Award for Young Adult Fiction (USA)
- Victoria Butler Book Prize nominee
