= TD Canadian Children's Literature Award =

Annual Canadian literary award

- Awarded for: Children's literature
- Sponsored by: TD Bank Financial Group and the Canadian Children's Book Centre
- Reward: $50,000 CAD
- Website: https://bookcentre.ca/resources/canadian-childrens-awards

The TD Canadian Children's Literature Award is an annual Canadian literary award, presented to the year's best work of children's literature. Sponsored by TD Bank Financial Group and the Canadian Children's Book Centre, the award carries a monetary prize of $30,000. On September 11, 2018, it was announced that the monetary prize was increased from $30,000 to $50,000.

Two awards are presented annually, one each for English language and French language works. The award is one of several presented by the Canadian Children's Book Centre each year; others include the Norma Fleck Award for Canadian Children's Non-Fiction, the Geoffrey Bilson Award for Historical Fiction for Young People and the Marilyn Baillie Picture Book Award.

== Winners ==
=== English-language award ===
English-language award winners and finalists
Year	Author	Title	Result	Ref.
2005	Marthe Jocelyn	Mable Riley: A Reliable Record of Humdrum, Peril, and Romance	Winner	
2005	Alan Cumyn	After Sylvia	Finalist	
2005	Kenneth Oppel	Airborn	Finalist	
2005	Kenneth Oppel, illus. by Barbara Reid	Peg and the Yeti	Finalist	
2005	Ange Zhang	Red Land, Yellow River: A Story from the Cultural Revolution	Finalist	
2006	Pamela Porter	The Crazy Man	Winner	
2006	Nicola I. Campbell, illus. by Kim LaFave	Shi-shi-etko	Finalist	
2006	Susan Hughes, illus. by Stéphane Poulin	Earth to Audrey	Finalist	
2006	Gail Nyoka	Mella and the N’anga: An African Tale	Finalist	
2007	Sarah Ellis	Odd Man Out	Winner	
2007	Linda Bailey, illus. by Bill Slavin	Stanley’s Wild Ride	Finalist	
2007	Hadley Dyer	Johnny Kellock Died Today	Finalist	
2007	Jan Thornhill	I Found a Dead Bird: The Kids’ Guide to the Cycle of Life & Death	Finalist	
2007	Tim Wynne-Jones	Rex Zero and the End of the World	Finalist	
2008	Christopher Paul Curtis	Elijah of Buxton	Winner	
2008	Hugh Brewster, paintings by John Singer Sargent	Carnation, Lily, Lily, Rose: The Story of a Painting	Finalist	
2008	Kenneth Oppel	Darkwing	Finalist	
2008	Shane Peacock	Eye of the Crow	Finalist	
2008	Frieda Wishinsky, illus. by Marie-Louise Gay	Please, Louise!	Finalist	
2009	Nicola I. Campbell, illus. by Kim LaFave	Shin-chi’s Canoe	Winner	
2009	Cary Fagan, illus. by Nicolas Debon	Thing-Thing	Finalist	
2009	Alma Fullerton	Libertad	Finalist	
2009	Susin Nielsen	Word Nerd	Finalist	
2009	Shane Peacock	Death in the Air	Finalist	
2010	Arthur Slade	The Hunchback Assignments	Winner	
2010	William Gilkerson	A Thousand Years of Pirates	Finalist	
2010	Nancy Hartry	Watching Jimmy	Finalist	
2010	Sharon Jennings	Home Free	Finalist	
2010	Janet McNaughton	Dragon Seer	Finalist	
2011	Erin Bow	Plain Kate	Winner	
2011	Laurel Croza, illus. by Matt James	I Know Here	Finalist	
2011	Alma Fullerton	Burn	Finalist	
2011	Gordon Lightfoot, illus. by Ian Wallace	Canadian Railroad Trilogy	Finalist	
2011	Valerie Sherrard	The Glory Wind	Finalist	
2012	Trilby Kent	Stones for My Father	Winner	
2012	Deborah Ellis	No Ordinary Day	Finalist	
2012	Susan Hughes	Off to Class: Incredible and Unusual Schools Around the World	Finalist	
2012	Shane Peacock	The Dragon Turn	Finalist	
2012	Andrea Spalding, illus. by Pascal Milelli	Seal Song	Finalist	
2013	Polly Horvath	One Year in Coal Harbour	Winner	
2013	Deborah Ellis	Kids of Kabul: Living Bravely Through a Never-Ending War	Finalist	
2013	Jennifer Lanthier, illus. by François Thisdale	The Stamp Collector	Finalist	
2013	Kyo Maclear, illus. by Isabelle Arsenault	Virginia Wolf	Finalist	
2013	Susin Nielsen	The Reluctant Journal of Henry K. Larsen	Finalist	
2014	Kathy Stinson, illus. by Dušan Petričić	The Man with the Violin	Winner	
2014	Andrew Larsen, illus. by Dušan Petričić	In the Tree House	Finalist	
2014	Jean E. Pendziwol, illus. by Isabelle Arsenault	Once Upon a Northern Night	Finalist	
2014	Ken Setterington	Branded by the Pink Triangle	Finalist	
2014	Teresa Toten	The Unlikely Hero of Room 13B	Finalist	
2015	Jonathan Auxier	The Night Gardener	Winner	
2015	Christine Baldacchino, illus. by Isabelle Malenfant	Morris Micklewhite and the Tangerine Dress	Finalist	
2015	Hugh Brewster	From Vimy to Victory: Canada’s Fight to the Finish in World War I	Finalist	
2015	Marie-Louise Gay	Any Questions?	Finalist	
2015	Margriet Ruurs and Katherine Gibson	A Brush Full of Colour: The World of Ted Harrison	Finalist	
2016	Melanie Florence, illus. by François Thisdale	Missing Nimâmâ	Winner	
2016	Michelle Barker, illus. by Renné Benoit	A Year of Borrowed Men	Finalist	
2016	Carolyn Beck, illus. by François Thisdale	The Squeak	Finalist	
2016	Willow Dawson	The Wolf-Birds	Finalist	
2016	Kenneth Oppel	The Nest	Finalist	
2017	Jan Thornhill	The Tragic Tale of the Great Auk	Winner	
2017	Jon-Erik Lappano, illus. by Kellen Hatanaka	Tokyo Digs a Garden	Finalist	
2017	Iain Lawrence	The Skeleton Tree	Finalist	
2017	Kit Pearson	A Day of Signs and Wonders	Finalist	
2017	David Alexander Robertson, illus. by Julie Flett	When We Were Alone	Finalist	
2018	Joanne Schwartz, illus. by Sydney Smith	Town Is by the Sea	Winner	
2018	Paul Harbridge, illus. by Matt James	When the Moon Comes	Finalist	
2018	Wendy Orr	Dragonfly Song	Finalist	
2018	Barbara Reid	Picture the Sky	Finalist	
2018	Monique Gray Smith	Speaking Our Truth: A Journey of Reconciliation	Finalist	
2019	Heather Smith	Ebb & Flow	Winner	
2019	Jonathan Auxier	Sweep: A Story About a Girl and Her Monster	Finalist	
2019	Marie-Louise Gay	Mustafa	Finalist	
2019	Jillian Tamaki	They Say Blue	Finalist	
2019	Merrie-Ellen Wilcox	After Life: Ways We Think About Death	Finalist	
2020	Julie Flett	Birdsong	Winner	
2020	Erin Bow	Stand on the Sky	Finalist	
2020	Kyo Maclear, illus. by Julie Morstad	It Began With a Page: How Gyo Fujikawa Drew the Way	Finalist	
2020	Sydney Smith	Small in the City	Finalist	
2020	Eric Walters and Kathy Kacer	Broken Strings	Finalist	
2021	Terry, Eric, and Devin Fan	The Barnabus Project	Winner	
2021	Melanie Mosher	A Beginner’s Guide to Goodbye	Finalist	
2021	Kenneth Oppel	Bloom	Finalist	
2021	David A. Robertson	The Barren Grounds	Finalist	
2021	Lauren Soloy	When Emily Was Small	Finalist	
2022	David A. Robertson, illus. by Julie Flett	On the Trapline	Winner	
2022	Dr. Lindsay Herriot and Kate Fry (ed.)	Growing Up Trans: In Our Own Words	Finalist	
2022	Thomas King, illus. by Natasha Donovan	Borders	Finalist	
2022	Sara O'Leary, illus. by Qin Leng	A Kid Is a Kid Is a Kid	Finalist	
2022	Basil Sylvester and Kevin Sylvester, illus. by Kevin Sylvester	The Fabulous Zed Watson!	Finalist	
2023	Kim Spencer	Weird Rules to Follow	Winner	
2023	Michelle Kadarusman	Berani	Finalist	
2023	Sara Cassidy, illus. by Brady Sato	Kunoichi Bunny	Finalist	
2023	Erin Silver, illus. by Michelle Theodore	Sitting Shiva	Finalist	
2023	Carey Newman and Kirstie Hudson	The Witness Blanket: Truth, Art and Reconciliation	Finalist	
2024	Jean E. Pendziwol, Todd Stewart	Skating Wild on an Inland Sea	Winner	
2024	Erin Bow	Simon Sort of Says	Finalist	
2024	Colleen Nelson	The Umbrella House	Finalist	
2024	Sydney Smith	Do You Remember?	Finalist	
2024	Nhung N. Tran-Davies	Green Papayas	Finalist	

=== French-language award ===
French-language award winners and finalists
Year	Author	Title	Result	Ref.
2005	François Barcelo, illus. by Anne Villeneuve	Le nul et la chipie	Winner	
2005	Pierre Chastenay	La Terre, la lune et le soleil	Finalist	
2005	Christiane Duchesne, illus. by François Thisdale	La Nuit des mystères	Finalist	
2005	Hervé Gagnon	Fils de sorcière	Finalist	
2005	Henriette Major, illus. by Philippe Béha	Les devinettes d’Henriette	Finalist	
2006	François Gravel, illus. by Pierre Pratt	David et le salon funéraire	Winner	
2006	Elaine Arsenault (Texte français de Christiane Duchesne), illus. by Fanny	Les Petites bêtises de Passepoil	Finalist	
2006	Angèle Delaunois, illus. by Pierre Houde	Le Pays sans musique	Finalist	
2006	Andrée Poulin	Les Impatiences de Ping	Finalist	
2007	André Leblanc	L’Envers de la chanson : des enfants au travail 1850-1950	Winner	
2007	Angèle Delaunois, illus. by Gérard Frischeteau	Les Enfants de l’eau	Finalist	
2007	Daniel Mativat	Le Chat du Père Noé	Finalist	
2007	Michel Noël	Hush! Hush!	Finalist	
2007	Mélanie Watt	Frisson l’écureuil	Finalist	
2008	Gilles Vigneault, illus. by Stéphane Jorisch	Un cadeau pour Sophie	Winner	
2008	Angèle Delaunois, illus. by Pierre Houde	Le Mur	Finalist	
2008	Badiâa Sekfali, illus. by Jean-Marie Benoit	Farouj le coq	Finalist	
2008	Danielle Simard, illus. by Geneviève Côté	La Petite rapporteuse de mots	Finalist	
2008	Mélanie Watt	Chester	Finalist	
2009	Anne Villeneuve	Chère Traudi	Winner	
2009	Angèle Delaunois, illus. by Christine Delezenne	La clé	Finalist	
2009	Jacques Pasquet, illus. by Pierre Pratt	L’étoile de Sarajevo	Finalist	
2009	Carole Tremblay, illus. by Steve Beshwaty	Le nouveau parapluie de Floup	Finalist	
2009	Rogé	La vraie histoire de Léo Pointu	Finalist	
2010	Mélanie Tellier, illus. by Melinda Josie	Le géranium	Winner	
2010	Philippe Béha	Monsieur Leloup	Finalist	
2010	Geneviève Côté	Comme toi!	Finalist	
2010	Angèle Delaunois, photos by Martine Doyon	Venus d’ailleurs	Finalist	
2010	Guy Marchamps, illus. by Marie-Claude Favreau	Rêver à l’envers, c’est encore rêver	Finalist	
2011	Linda Amyot	La fille d’en face	Winner	
2011	Martine Audet, illus. by Luc Melanson	Xavier-la-lune	Finalist	
2011	Alain M. Bergeron, Édith Bourget, Colombe Labonté, and Guy Marchamps, illus. by Caroline Merola	Oh! la vache!	Finalist	
2011	Marianne Dubuc	Devant ma maison	Finalist	
2011	Claire Vigneau, illus. by Bruce Roberts	Le chasseur de loups-marins	Finalist	
2012	Mario Brassard, illus. by Suana Verelst	La saison des pluies	Winner	
2012	Denis Côté, illus. by Anne Sol	L’amélanchier, conte de Jacques Ferron	Finalist	
2012	Louis Émond, illus. by Philippe Béha	Le monde de Théo	Finalist	
2012	Sylvie Nicolas, illus. by Marion Arbona	Lapin-Chagrin et les jours d’Elko	Finalist	
2012	Jacques Pasquet, illus. by Marion Arbona	Mots doux pour endormir la nuit	Finalist	
2013	Michel Noël	À la recherche du bout du monde	Winner	
2013	Fanny Britt, illus. by Isabelle Arsenault	Jane, le renard & moi	Finalist	
2013	Élise Gravel	La clé à molette	Finalist	
2013	Marie-Francine Hébert, illus. by Jean-Luc Trudel	Tu me prends en photo	Finalist	
2013	Rogé (Poems by Inuit schoolchildren)	Mingan, mon village	Finalist	
2014	Andrée Poulin	La plus grosse poutine du monde	Winner	
2014	India Desjardins, illus. by Pascal Blanchet	Le Noël de Marguerite	Finalist	
2014	Jasmine Dubé, illus. by Jean-Luc Trudel	Ma petite boule d’amour	Finalist	
2014	Marianne Dubuc	Le lion et l’oiseau	Finalist	
2014	Élizabeth Turgeon	Destins croisés	Finalist	
2015	Marianne Dubuc	L’autobus	Winner	
2015	Agnès Grimaud	Papillons de l’ombre	Finalist	
2015	Mireille Levert	Quand j’écris avec mon cœur	Finalist	
2015	André Marois, illus. by Patrick Doyon	Le voleur de sandwichs	Finalist	
2015	Andrée Poulin, illus. by Isabelle Malenfant	Pablo trouve un trésor	Finalist	
2016	Jacques Goldstyn	L’arbragan	Winner	
2016	Jacques Goldstyn	Le prisonnier sans frontières	Finalist	
2016	Patrick Isabelle	Camille	Finalist	
2016	André Marois, illus. by Pierre Pratt	Aux toilettes	Finalist	
2016	Maryse Rouy	L’épopée de Petit-Jules	Finalist	
2017	Larry Tremblay, illus. by Guillaume Perreault	Même pas vrai	Winner	
2017	Pascal Blanchet	En voiture! L’Amérique en chemin de fer	Finalist	
2017	Étienne Poirier	Niska	Finalist	
2017	Andrée Poulin, illus. by Enzo Lord Mariano	Y’a pas de place chez nous	Finalist	
2017	Elaine Turgeon, illus. by Martin Laliberté	Aaah!bécédaire	Finalist	
2018	Marianne Dubuc	Le chemin de la montagne	Winner	
2018	Philippe Béha	Bleu	Finalist	
2018	Marie-Francine Hébert, illus. by Jean-Luc Trudel	Pow Pow, t’es mort!	Finalist	
2018	Mathieu Lavoie	Gilles	Finalist	
2018	Jeanne Painchaud, photos by Bruno Ricca	ABCMTL	Finalist	
2019	Stéphanie Boulay, illus. by Agathe Bray-Bourret	Anatole qui ne séchait jamais	Winner	
2019	Anaïs Barbeau-Lavalette, illus. by Mathilde Cinq-Mars	Nos héroïnes	Finalist	
2019	Jacques Goldstyn	Jules et Jim, frères d’armes	Finalist	
2019	André Marois, illus. by Julien Castanié	Moi, c’est Tantale	Finalist	
2019	Andrée Poulin, illus. by Mathieu Lampron	Qui va bercer Zoé?	Finalist	
2020	Jacques Goldstyn	L’étoiles	Winner	
2020	Amélie Dumoulin, illus. by Todd Stewart	Pipo	Finalist	
2020	Annie Gravel, illus. by Enzo	Mon ami Pierrot	Finalist	
2020	Todd Stewart	Quand le vent souffle	Finalist	
2020	Webster, illus. by ValMo	Le grain de sable: Olivier Le Jeune, premier esclave au Canada	Finalist	
2021	Vigg	Ma maison-tête	Winner	
2021	Lucile de Pesloüan, illus. by Geneviève Darling	C’est quoi l’amour?	Finalist	
2021	Christiane Duchesne	Aurore et le pays invisible	Finalist	
2021	Matthew Forsythe	Pokko et le tambour	Finalist	
2021	Véronique Grénier	Colle-moi	Finalist	
2022	Orbie	La fin des poux?	Winner	
2022	Simon Boulerice, illus. by Eve Patenaude	Papier bulle	Finalist	
2022	Hugo Léger, illus. by Julie Rocheleau	Les devoirs d’Edmond	Finalist	
2022	Carole Tremblay, illus. by Élodie Duhameau	La guerre des bébés	Finalist	
2022	Aimée Verret	Dans mon garde-robe	Finalist	
2023	Paul Tom, illus. by Mélanie Baillairgé	Seuls	Winner	
2023	Véronique Lambert, illus. by Éléna Comte	Dans les souliers d’Amédée	Finalist	
2023	Guylaine Guay, illus. by Bach	Gloria sort du moule	Finalist	
2023	Mylène Goupil	Mélie quelque part au milieu	Finalist	
2023	Frédérick Wolfe	Toucher les étoiles	Finalist	
2024	Christine Beaulieu, Caroline Lavergne Frédérick Wolfe	Les saumons de la Mitis	Winner	
2024	Alexis Mc Knoell	La couleur de ma difference	Finalist	
2024	Jonathan Bécotte, Enzo	Taches d'huile	Finalist	
2024	Élise Gravel	Alerte : culottes meurtrières	Finalist	
2024	Ugo Monticone, Orbie	Le Cumulus machinus	Finalist	
