= Marilyn Baillie Picture Book Award =

Literary award for best children's picture book

The Marilyn Baillie Picture Book Award is an annual Canadian literary award, presented to the year's best illustrated picture book for children. Sponsored by A. Charles Baillie and administered by the Canadian Children's Book Centre, the award carries a monetary prize of $20,000. The award is named in honour of Marilyn Baillie, a children's book author and early childhood educator who is married to former TD Bank chairman A. Charles Baillie.

The award is one of several presented by the Canadian Children's Book Centre each year; others include the Norma Fleck Award for Canadian Children's Non-Fiction, the Geoffrey Bilson Award for Historical Fiction for Young People and the TD Canadian Children's Literature Award.

== Winners and nominees ==
Marilyn Baillie Picture Book Award winners and finalists
Year	Author	Illustrator	Title	Result	Ref.
2006	Marie-Louise Gay	Marie-Louise Gay	Caramba!	Winner	
2006	Nicola I. Campbell	Kim LaFave	Shi-shi-etko	Finalist	
2006	Sharon Jennings	Mélanie Watt	Bearcub and Mama	Finalist	
2006	Connie Kaldor and Carmen Campagne	Brian Deines	Lullaby Berceuse: A Warm Prairie Night	Finalist	
2006	Mireille Levert	Mireille Levert	Eddie Longpants	Finalist	
2007	Sara O'Leary	Julie Morstad	When You Were Small	Winner	
2007	Catherine Jameson	Julie Flett	Zoe and the Fawn	Finalist	
2007	Barbara Reid	Barbara Reid	Fox Walked Alone	Finalist	
2007	Ellen Schwartz	Sima Elizabeth Shefrin	Abby's Birds	Finalist	
2007	Mélanie Watt	Mélanie Watt	Augustine	Finalist	
2007	Mélanie Watt	Mélanie Watt	Scaredy Squirrel	Finalist	
2008	Frieda Wishinsky	Marie-Louise Gay	Please, Louise!	Winner	
2008	Barroux, Jane MacAulay (trans.)	Barroux	Super Handyman: The Master of Tools	Finalist	
2008	Nan Gregory	Luc Melanson	Pink	Finalist	
2008	Robert Heidbreder	Dušan Petričić	Lickety-Split	Finalist	
2009	Hazel Hutchins and Gail Herbert	Dušan Petričić	Mattland	Winner	
2009	Nicola I. Campbell	Kim LaFave	Shin-chi's Canoe	Finalist	
2009	Cary Fagan	Nicolas Debon	Thing-Thing	Finalist	
2009	Pamela Hickman	Geraldo Valério	It's Moving Day!	Finalist	
2009	Ruth Ohi	Ruth Ohi	Chicken, Pig, Cow	Finalist	
2010	Colleen Sydor	Nicolas Debon	Timmerman Was Here	Winner	
2010	Geneviève Côté	Geneviève Côté	Me and You	Finalist	
2010	Janet Perlman	Janet Perlman	The Delicious Bug	Finalist	
2010	Joanne Schwartz	Laura Beingessner	Our Corner Grocery Store	Finalist	
2010	Frieda Wishinsky	Kady MacDonald Denton	You're Mean, Lily Jean	Finalist	
2011	Laurel Croza	Matt James	I Know Here	Winner	
2011	Linda Bailey	Bill Slavin	Stanley's Little Sister	Finalist	
2011	Marianne Dubuc, Yvette Ghione (trans.)	Marianne Dubuc	In Front of My House	Finalist	
2011	Kyo Maclear	Isabelle Arsenault	Spork	Finalist	
2011	Caroline Woodward	Julie Morstad	Singing Away the Dark	Finalist	
2012	Geneviève Côté	Geneviève Côté	Without You	Winner	
2012	Dan Bar-el	Rae Maté	Pussycat, Pussycat, Where Have You Been?	Finalist	
2012	Barbara Reid	Barbara Reid	Picture a Tree	Finalist	
2012	Ashley Spires	Ashley Spires	Small Saul	Finalist	
2012	Nicola Winstanley	Janice Nadeau	Cinnamon Baby	Finalist	
2013	Cary Fagan	Dušan Petričić	Mr. Zinger's Hat	Winner	
2013	Geneviève Côté	Geneviève Côté	Mr. King's Things	Finalist	
2013	Wallace Edwards	Wallace Edwards	Uncle Wally's Old Brown Shoe	Finalist	
2013	Jennifer Lanthier	François Thisdale	The Stamp Collector	Finalist	
2013	Kyo Maclear	Isabelle Arsenault	Virginia Wolf	Finalist	
2014	Julie Morstad	Julie Morstad	How To	Winner	
2014	Marthe Jocelyn and Nell Jocelyn	Marthe Jocelyn and Nell Jocelyn	Where Do You Look?	Finalist	
2014	Ruth Ohi	Ruth Ohi	Fox and Squirrel	Finalist	
2014	Kathy Stinson	Dušan Petričić	The Man with the Violin	Finalist	
2014	Eric Walters	Eugenie Fernandes	My Name Is Blessing	Finalist	
2015	Cybèle Young	Cybèle Young	Nancy Knows	Winner	
2015	Christine Baldacchino	Isabelle Malenfant	Morris Micklewhite and the Tangerine Dress	Finalist	
2015	Laurel Croza	Matt James	From There to Here	Finalist	
2015	Roy Miki and Slavia Miki	Julie Flett	Dolphin SOS	Finalist	
2015	Ashley Spires	Ashley Spires	The Most Magnificent Thing	Finalist	
2015	Eric Walters	Eugenie Fernandes	Hope Springs	Finalist	
2016	Danielle Daniel	Danielle Daniel	Sometimes I Feel Like a Fox	Winner	
2016	Willow Dawson	Willow Dawson	The Wolf-Birds	Finalist	
2016	Maureen Fergus	Dušan Petričić	InvisiBill	Finalist	
2016	Alma Fullerton	Brian Deines	In a Cloud of Dust	Finalist	
2016	JonArno Lawson	Sydney Smith	Sidewalk Flowers	Finalist	
2017	Jennifer McGrath	Josée Bisaillon	The Snow Knows	Winner	
2017	Jenny Kay Dupuis and Kathy Kacer	Gillian Newland	I Am Not a Number	Finalist	
2017	Chris Hadfield and Kate Fillion	The Fan Brothers	The Darkest Dark	Finalist	
2017	Jon Klassen	Jon Klassen	We Found a Hat	Finalist	
2017	Shane Peacock	Sophie Casson	The Artist and Me	Finalist	
2018	Paul Harbridge	Matt James	When the Moon Comes	Winner	
2018	Suzanne Del Rizzo	Suzanne Del Rizzo	My Beautiful Birds	Finalist	
2018	Cary Fagan	Madeline Kloepper	Little Blue Chair	Finalist	
2018	Melanie Florence	Gabrielle Grimard	Stolen Words	Finalist	
2018	Monique Gray Smith	Danielle Daniel	You Hold Me Up	Finalist	
2018	Debbie Ridpath Ohi	Debbie Ridpath Ohi	Sam & Eva	Finalist	
2019	Shauntay Grant	Eva Campbell	Africville	Winner	
2019	Marie-Louise Gay	Marie-Louise Gay	Mustafa	Finalist	
2019	Jami Gigot	Jami Gigot	Seb and the Sun	Finalist	
2019	Matt James	Matt James	The Funeral	Finalist	
2019	Jillian Tamaki	Jillian Tamaki	They Say Blue	Finalist	
2020	Sydney Smith	Sydney Smith	Small in the City	Winner	
2020	Saumiya Balasubramaniam	Qin Leng	When I Found Grandma	Finalist	
2020	Cary Fagan	Dena Seiferling	King Mouse	Finalist	
2020	Julie Flett	Julie Flett	Birdsong	Finalist	
2020	James Gladstone	Gary Clement	My Winter City	Finalist	
2020	Heather Smith	Rachel Wada	The Phone Booth in Mr. Hirota’s Garden	Finalist	
2021	Jillian Tamaki	Jillian Tamaki	Our Little Kitchen	Winner	
2021	Suzanne Del Rizzo	Miki Sato	Golden Threads	Finalist	
2021	The Fan Brothers	The Fan Brothers	The Barnabus Project	Finalist	
2021	Naseem Hrab	Frank Viva	Weekend Dad	Finalist	
2021	Rebecca Thomas	Maya McKibbin	Swift Fox All Along	Finalist	
2022	Julie Morstad	Julie Morstad	Time is a Flower	Winner	
2022	Julie Flett	Julie Flett	We All Play/Kimêtawânaw	Finalist	
2022	Bill Richardson	Bill Pechet	Hare B&B	Finalist	
2022	David A. Robertson	Julie Flett	On the Trapline	Finalist	
2022	Gracey Zhang	Gracey Zhang	Lala's Words	Finalist	
2023	Matthew Forsythe	Matthew Forsythe	Mina	Winner	
2023	Mariam Körner	Mariam Körner	Fox and Bear	Finalist	
2023	Marie-Louise Gay	Marie-Louise Gay	I'm Not Sydney!	Finalist	
2023	Nancy Vo	Nancy Vo	Boobies	Finalist	
2023	The Fan Brothers	The Fan Brothers	Lizzy and the Cloud	Finalist	
2024	Jack Wong	Jack Wong	When You Can Swim	Winner	
2024	Lucy Ruth Cummins		Our Pool	Finalist	
2024	Judith Henderson	Nahid Kazemi	Love Is in the Bear	Finalist	
2024	Jean E. Pendziwol	Todd Stewart	Skating Wild on an Inland Sea	Finalist	
2024	Kathy Stinson	Lauren Soloy	A Tulip in Winter: A Story About Folk Artist Maud Lewis	Finalist	
2025	Yayo		SOS Water	Winner	
2025	Julie Morstad		A Face Is a Poem	Finalist	
2025	Danielle Daniel	Matt James	I’m Afraid, Said the Leaf	Finalist	
2025	Tanya Tagaq	Cee Pootoogook	It Bears Repeating	Finalist	
2025	Janie Hao		Mad at Dad	Finalist	
2026	Thao Lam		Everybelly	Finalist	
2026	Elizabeth Withey	Salini Perera	Ins and Outs	Finalist	
2026	Julie Flett		My Friend May	Finalist	
2026	Melanie Florence	Matt James	The One About the Blackbird	Finalist	
2026	Laurel Croza	Matt James	Rock	Finalist	
