= Danielle Daniel =

Canadian author

- Born: Greater Sudbury, Ontario, Canada
- Education: Laurentian University (BEd); Ottawa University (BA); University of British Columbia (MFA)
- Occupations: Author and illustrator
- Writing career
- Notable awards: Marilyn Baillie Picture Book Award (2016)

Danielle Daniel is a Canadian author and illustrator.

Daniel grew up in Greater Sudbury. She received a Bachelor of Education from Laurentian University, a Bachelor of Arts in women's studies from Ottawa University, and a Master of Fine Arts in creative writing from the University of British Columbia.

Daniel started her career as an elementary school teacher. She began her career as an author when she published Sometimes I Feel Like a Fox (2015), a children's picture book. In 2016, Sometimes I Feel Like a Fox won the Marilyn Baillie Picture Book Award and was a finalist for First Nation Communities Read; the following year, it was a finalist for the Blue Spruce Award. Sometimes I Feel Like a Fox was the first in a collection, followed by Sometimes I Feel Like a River (2023) and Sometimes I Feel Like an Oak (2024). Since her first publication, she has written and illustrated several children's picture books. In 2022, she published her first middle grade novel, Forever Birch, as well as her first adult novel, Daughters of the Deer. In 2025, she launched the published company Mighty Village Books, which specializes in children's literature by Canadians from marginalized backgrounds, particularly in Northern Ontario.

Daniel is married to Sergeant Steve Daniel. Throughout the first years of their marriage, Sergeant Daniel was often on military tours. In 2005, a parachuting accident resulted in him becoming paralyzed. Daniel has discussed her experiences of being a military wife, along with Sergeant Daniel's later accident, in her memoir, The Dependent (2017).

As of 2026, Daniel lives with her family on Manitoulin Island.

== Awards ==
Awards for Daniel's work
Year	Award	Award	Result	Ref.
2016	Sometimes I Feel Like a Fox	First Nation Communities Read	Finalist	
2016	Sometimes I Feel Like a Fox	Marilyn Baillie Picture Book Award	Winner	
2017	Sometimes I Feel Like a Fox	Blue Spruce Award	Finalist	
2018	You Hold Me Up	Marilyn Baillie Picture Book Award	Finalist	
2022	Forever Birchwood	Northern Lights Book Award: Middle School Book of the Year	Winner	
2023	Forever Birchwood	Ruth & Sylvia Schwartz Children's Book Awards	Finalist	
2023	Forever Birchwood	Silver Birch Award	Finalist	
2024	Forever Birchwood	Manitoba Young Readers' Choice Award: Sundogs	Selection	
2024	I'm Afraid, Said the Leaf	Governor General's Award for English-language Young People's Literature - Illustrated Books	Finalist	
2025	I'm Afraid, Said the Leaf	IODE Jean Throop Book Award	Finalist	
2025	I'm Afraid, Said the Leaf	Marilyn Baillie Picture Book Award	Finalist	
2026	Reasons to Look at the Night Sky	David Booth Children's and Youth Poetry Award	Finalist	
2026	Reasons to Look at the Night Sky	Manitoba Young Readers' Choice Award	Finalist	

== Publications ==
=== Children's books ===
- Daniel, Danielle (2015). Sometimes I Feel Like a Fox. Groundwood. ISBN 978-1-554-98750-4.
- Daniel, Danielle (2017). Once in a Blue Moon. Groundwood. ISBN 978-1-554-98975-1.
- Smith, Monique Gray (2017). You Hold Me Up. Illustrated by Danielle Daniel. Orca. ISBN 978-1-459-81447-9.
- Daniel, Danielle (2022). Forever Birchwood. HarperCollins. ISBN 978-1-443-46334-8.
- Daniel, Danielle (2023). Sometimes I Feel Like a River. Illustrated by Josée Bisaillon. Groundwood. ISBN 978-1-773-06696-7.
- Daniel, Danielle (2024). I'm Afraid, Said the Leaf. Illustrated by Matt James. Tundra Books. ISBN 978-1-774-88070-8.
- Daniel, Danielle (2024). Reasons to Look at the Night Sky. Tundra Books. ISBN 978-1-774-88353-2.
- Daniel, Danielle (2024). Sometimes I Feel Like an Oak. Illustrated by Jackie Traverse. Groundwood. ISBN 978-1-773-06698-1.

=== Adult books ===
- Daniel, Danielle (2017). The Dependent: A Memoir of Marriage & the Military. Latitude 46. ISBN 978-0-994-91834-5.
- Daniel, Danielle (2022). Daughters of the Deer. Random House. ISBN 978-0-735-28208-7.
