= Isabelle Malenfant =

Isabelle Malenfant may refer to:

- Isabelle Malenfant (editor), a Canadian film and television editor,
- Isabelle Malenfant (illustrator), a Canadian children's book illustrator.
