= Delaunois =

Delaunois is a surname. Notable people with the surname include:

- Angèle Delaunois (born 1946), Canadian author
- Ghislain Delaunois (1923–1992), Belgian fencer
- Raymonde Delaunois (1885–1984), Belgian opera singer
