= Shane Peacock (writer) =

Canadian writer

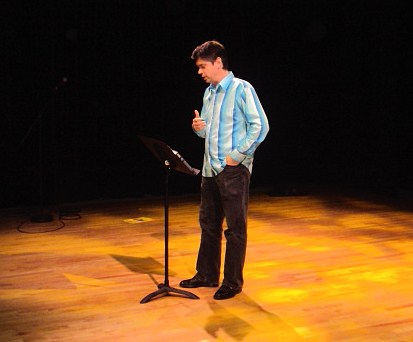
- Peacock on stage in Toronto
- Born: 1957 (age 68–69) Port Arthur, Canada
- Occupation: Novelist, playwright, journalist, and television screenwriter
- Education: Trent University (B.A., English and history); University of Toronto, (M.A., literature)
- Notable works: The Boy Sherlock Holmes
- Notable awards: Arthur Ellis Awards (2013); Libris Award; Ruth and Sylvia Schwartz Award
- Spouse: Sophie Kneisel
- Children: 3

Website
- shanepeacock.ca

Shane Peacock (born 1957 in Port Arthur, Ontario) is a Canadian novelist, playwright, journalist, and television screenwriter. He's best known for his Boy Sherlock Holmes series for young adults, which has been published in ten countries in twelve languages and has received and been nominated for numerous award. His plays have been produced by the 4th Line Theatre; his documentaries have included Team Spirit, aired on the CTV national network, and among his novels are Last Message, part of the Seven Series for young readers; Double You, its sequel; and Separated, its prequel. His crime novel series for adult readers, the Northern Gothic Mysteries, debuted in 2024 with As We Forgive Others, and the sequel A Place of Secrets appeared in 2025.

== Biography ==
Peacock was born in 1957, in Port Arthur, Ontario. He received a Bachelor of Arts in English and history from Trent University and a Master of Arts in literature from the University of Toronto.

He is married to Sophie Kneisel and has three children.

== Awards and honours ==
Seven of Peacock's books are Junior Library Guild selections: Eye Of The Crow (2007), Death in the Air (2008), Vanishing Girl (2009), The Secret Fiend (2010), The Dragon Turn (2011), Becoming Holmes (2013), and The Artist and Me (2016).

In 2016, Kirkus Reviews included The Artist and Me on its list of the best picture books of the year.

In 2017, CBC Books included Eye of the Crow on their list of "100 young adult books that make you proud to be Canadian."

Awards for Peacock's writing
| Year | Title | Award | Result | Ref. |
|---|---|---|---|---|
| 2007 | Eye Of The Crow | INDIES Award for Juvenile Fiction (Children's) | Winner (Gold) | |
| 2008 | Death in the Air | INDIES Award for Juvenile Fiction (Children's) | Finalist | |
| 2008 | Eye Of The Crow | Arthur Ellis Award for Best Juvenile Crime Book | Winner | |
| 2008 | Eye Of The Crow | IODE Violet Downey Book Award | Winner | |
| 2008 | Eye Of The Crow | Moonbeam Award for Pre-Teen Fiction | Winner (Gold) | |
| 2008 | Eye Of The Crow | TD Canadian Children's Literature Award | Finalist | |
| 2009 | Death in the Air | TD Canadian Children's Literature Award | Finalist | |
| 2009 | Eye Of The Crow | Manitoba Young Readers Choice Award | Nominee | |
| 2009 | Vanishing Girl | INDIES Award for Young Adult Fiction (Children's) | Finalist | |
| 2010 | Death in the Air | Manitoba Young Readers Choice Award | Nominee | |
| 2010 | Vanishing Girl | Arthur Ellis Award for Best Juvenile Crime Book | Nominee | |
| 2010 | Vanishing Girl | Geoffrey Bilson Award | Winner | |
| 2010 | Vanishing Girl | IODE Violet Downey Book Award | Winner | |
| 2010 | Vanishing Girl | Libris Award | Winner | |
| 2010 | Vanishing Girl | Ruth and Sylvia Schwartz Children’s Book Award | Winner | |
| 2011 | The Dragon Turn | INDIES Award for Young Adult Fiction (Children's) | Honorable mention | |
| 2011 | The Secret Fiend | Arthur Ellis Award for Best Juvenile Crime Book | Nominee | |
| 2011 | Vanishing Girl | Manitoba Young Readers Choice Award | Nominee | |
| 2012 | The Dragon Turn | Arthur Ellis Award for Best Juvenile Crime Book | Nominee | |
| 2012 | The Dragon Turn | John Spray Mystery Award | Finalist | |
| 2012 | The Dragon Turn | TD Canadian Children's Literature Award | Finalist | |
| 2013 | Becoming Holmes | Arthur Ellis Award for Best Juvenile/Young Adult Crime Book | Winner | |
| 2013 | Becoming Holmes | Governor General's Award for English-language children's literature | Finalist | |
| 2013 | Becoming Holmes | John Spray Mystery Award | Finalist | |
| 2013 | The Dragon Turn | Manitoba Young Readers Choice Award | Nominee | |
| 2017 | The Artist and Me | Marilyn Baillie Picture Book Award | Finalist | |
| 2017 | The Dark Missions of Edgar Brim | Arthur Ellis Award for Best Juvenile/Young Adult Crime Book | Nominee | |
| 2017 | The Dark Missions of Edgar Brim | John Spray Mystery Award | Finalist | |
| 2019 | Monster | Arthur Ellis Award for Best Juvenile/Young Adult Crime Book | Nominee | |
| 2020 | Demon | Arthur Ellis Award for Best Juvenile/Young Adult Crime Book | Nominee | |
| 2020 | Phantom of Fire | Arthur Ellis Award for Best Juvenile/Young Adult Crime Book | Nominee | |
| 2020 | Demon | Sunburst Award | Longlist | |
| 2025 | As We Forgive Others | Crime Writers of Canada Awards of Excellence for Best Crime Novel Set in Canada | Nominee | |

== Publications ==
=== Novels ===
==== Standalone books ====
- The Book Of Us (2022)
- Show (2025)

==== The Northern Gothic Mysteries ====
1. As We Forgive Others (2024)
2. A Place of Secrets (2025)

==== The Dark Missions of Edgar Brim ====
1. The Dark Missions of Edgar Brim (2016)
2. Monster (2018)
3. Demon (2019)

==== The Boy Sherlock Holmes ====
1. Eye of the Crow (2007)
2. Death in the Air (2008)
3. Vanishing Girl (2009)
4. The Secret Fiend (2010)
5. The Dragon Turn (2011)
6. Becoming Holmes (2012)

==== The Dylan Maples Adventures ====
1. The Mystery of Ireland's Eye (1999)
2. The Secret of the Silver Mines (2001)
3. Bone Beds of the Badlands (2002)
4. Monster in the Mountains (2003)
5. Phantom of Fire (2019)

Picture Books

- The Artist and Me (2016)

=== History ===
- The Great Farini: The High Wire Life of William Hunt (1995)
- Unusual Heroes (2002)

=== Plays ===
- The Great Farini, 4th Line Theatre (1994)
- The Devil and Joseph Scriven, 4th Line Theatre (1999, 2000)
- The Art of Silent Killing, 4th Line Theatre (2006)
