= Geneviève Côté =

Canadian illustrator

Geneviève Côté (born 1964) is a Canadian illustrator living in Montreal, mainly known for her work on children's books.

She was born in Montreal, Quebec, and received a bachelor's degree in graphic design from Concordia University in 1987. Côté has contributed illustrations to various publications including The New York Times, The Boston Globe, Utne Reader and The Wall Street Journal; her work has been featured in magazines such as Communication Arts, Print and American Illustration. She has also worked for advertising agencies in Toronto, Montreal and Melbourne. From 1993 to 1995, Côté was president of the Association des illustrateurs et illustratrices du Québec.

== Selected works ==
- La grande aventure d’un petit mouton noir, text by Marie-Danielle Croteau (1999), appeared on the short list for a Governor General's Literary Award
- Le premier printemps du monde, Innu legend, text by Rémy Savard and Catherine Germain (2003), appeared on the short list for a Governor General's Literary Award
- The Lady of Shalott, text by Alfred, Lord Tennyson (2005), received the Elizabeth Mrazik-Cleaver Canadian Picture Book Award
- La chambre vide, text by Gilles Tibo (2005)
- La petite rapporteuse de mots, text by Danielle Simard (2007), received the Governor General's Award for French-language children's illustration and the Prix des Bibliothèques Jeunesse de Montréal, shortlisted for the Prix TD de littérature canadienne pour l’enfance et la jeunesse
- Me and You (2009), appeared on the short list for the Marilyn Baillie Picture Book Award
- Sans toi! (2011), appeared on the short list for the Prix des Libraires jeunesse, translated into English as Without You, received the Marilyn Baillie Picture Book Award
- Ella May and the Wishing Stone, text by Cary Fagan (2011)
