= Everyone Gets a Turn =

2022 picture book by Marianne Dubuc

- Author: Marianne Dubuc
- Original title: Chacun son tour !
- Translator: Celyn Harding-Jones
- Illustrator: Marianne Dubuc
- Language: French
- Genre: Children's literature
- Published: November 14, 2022
- Publisher: Éditions Album
- Publication place: Canada
- English publication date: March 2024
- Pages: 60
- ISBN: 978-2-925081-07-4 (Canada); 978-1-7972-2729-0 (U.S.)

Everyone Gets a Turn (French: Chacun son tour !) is a 2022 children's picture book by Quebecois author and illustrator Marianne Dubuc. About four forest animals who nurture an egg as it grows up to become a bird, it received positive reviews from U.S. outlets.

== Synopsis ==
Four forest friends—a mouse, a bear, a hare, and a turtle—find an egg during a game of catch, and argue who gets to take it home. Soon enough, they comply with the egg's demand that each take turns taking care of it, as it grows up to become "Little Bird" through its surrogate parents. By the end of the story, Little Bird ends up building her own home thanks to what she has learned from her caretakers, and decides to call herself Clara.

== Release and reception ==
Chacun son tour ! was published on November 14, 2022 by Éditions Album, and was later mentioned in two issues of the Quebecois children's-literature journal Lurelu. In March 2024, Princeton Architectural Press released an American English translation as Everyone Gets a Turn.

The book's Princeton edition received positive reviews. Prior to its publication, Publishers Weekly deemed Everyone Gets a Turn "a lively, thoughtful work". In their starred review, Kirkus wrote that Dubuc's "art portrays a gentle, verdant world filled with welcoming homes where neighbors share their expertise and support each other." In mid-2024, Cynthia K. Ritter of The Horn Book said, "Seven easily digestible sections [and] a picture-book trim size...make Dubuc's satisfying hybrid story a perfect match for both reading novices and slightly younger listeners." Reviewers praised Dubuc's detailed watercolour work, while also taking note of its philosophical themes and comic-book-like format. Ginnie Abbott in the School Library Journal recommended it for students wishing to continue the story after its actual ending.
