= Matt James (illustrator) =

Canadian illustrator

Matt James (born c. 1974) is a Canadian author and illustrator of children's books. In addition to writing and illustrating, James was a member of the band Très Bien Ensemble.

James was born in London, Ontario in 1973/1974 and grew up in Woodstock, Ontario. He attended Sheridan College, where he studied children's illustration. He is married and has two children. As of 2025, the family lived in Toronto.

== Awards and honours ==
In 2018, the The New York Times Book Review named James's The Funeral one of the year's best illustrated books.

Awards for James's work
Year	Title	Award	Result	Ref.
2008	Yellow Moon, Apple Moon	Governor General's Award for English-language children's illustration	Finalist	
2010	I Know Here	Boston Globe–Horn Book Award for Picture Book	Winner	
2010	I Know Here	Governor General's Award for English-language children's illustration	Finalist	
2011	I Know Here	Marilyn Baillie Picture Book Award	Winner	
2011	I Know Here	TD Canadian Children's Literature Award	Finalist	
2013	Northwest Passage	Governor General's Award for English-language children's illustration	Winner	
2015	From There to Here	Marilyn Baillie Picture Book Award	Finalist	
2017	When the Moon Comes	Governor General's Award for Young People's Literature - Illustrated Books	Finalist	
2018	When the Moon Comes	Marilyn Baillie Picture Book Award	Winner	
2018	When the Moon Comes	TD Canadian Children's Literature Award	Finalist	
2019	The Funeral	Ezra Jack Keats Book Award for Writer	Honor	
2019	The Funeral	Marilyn Baillie Picture Book Award	Finalist	
2024	I'm Afraid, Said the Leaf	Governor General's Award for Young People's Literature - Illustrated Books	Finalist	
2025	I Know How to Draw an Owl	Boston Globe–Horn Book Award for Picture Book	Winner	
2025	I’m Afraid, Said the Leaf	Marilyn Baillie Picture Book Award	Finalist	
2026	The One About the Blackbird	Marilyn Baillie Picture Book Award	Finalist	
2026	Rock	Marilyn Baillie Picture Book Award	Finalist	

== Publications ==
- Porter, Pamela (2008). Yellow Moon, Apple Moon. Illustrated by Matt James. Groundwood. ISBN 978-0-888-99809-5.
- Croza, Laurel (2010). I Know Here. Illustrated by Matt James. Groundwood. ISBN 978-0-888-99923-8.
- Rogers, Stan (2013). Northwest Passage. Illustrated by Matt James. Groundwood. ISBN 978-1-554-98153-3.
- Croza, Laurel (2014). From There to Here. Illustrated by Matt James. Groundwood. ISBN 978-1-554-98365-0.
- Richardson, Jael Ealey (2016). The Stone Thrower. Illustrated by Matt James. Groundwood. ISBN 978-1-554-98752-8.
- Harbridge, Paul (2017). When the Moon Comes. Illustrated by Matt James. Tundra. ISBN 978-1-101-91777-0.
- James, Matt (2018). The Funeral. Groundwood. ISBN 978-1-554-98908-9.
- James, Matt (2020). Nice Try, Charlie!. Groundwood. ISBN 978-1-773-06180-1.
- James, Matt (2023). Tadpoles. Holiday. ISBN 978-0-823-45005-3.
- Daniel, Danielle (2024). I’m Afraid, Said the Leaf. Illustrated by Matt James. Tundra. ISBN 978-1-774-88070-8.
- Horder Hippely, Hilary (2024). I Know How to Draw an Owl. Illustrated by Matt James. Holiday House. ISBN 978-0-823-45666-6.
- Croza, Laurel (2025). Rock. Illustrated by Matt James. Groundwood. ISBN 978-1-773-06948-7.
- Florence, Melanie (2025). The One About the Blackbird. Illustrated by Matt James. Tundra. ISBN 978-1-774-88266-5.
