= Sharon Fitzhenry Award =

Canadian literary award

The Sharon Fitzhenry Award for Canadian Children’s Non-Fiction, established in 2024, is an annual Canadian literary award that honours nonfiction books for children in grades 4 to 12 (ages 8 to 18). Administered by the Canadian Children's Book Centre, the award memorializes Sharon Fitzhenry, the former president and CEO of Fitzhenry & Whiteside. Winners receive CA$10,000.

== Honorees ==
Award winners and finalists
Year	Author	Illustrator	Work	Result	Ref.
2025	Elizabeth MacLeod	Mike Deas	Meet Jim Egan	Winner	
2025	Erin Silver	Suharu Ogawa	All Consuming: Shop Smarter for the Planet	Finalist	
2025	Chad Soon and George Chiang	Amy Qi	The Longest Shot: How Larry Kwong Changed the Face of Hockey	Finalist	
2025	Trina Rathgeber	Alina Pete and Jillian Dolan (colourist)	Lost at Windy River: A True Story of Survival	Finalist	
2025	Charlene Rocha and Mary Beth Leatherdale	Drew Shannon	You Can Be an Activist: How to Use Your Strengths & Passions to Make a Difference	Finalist	
2026	Charlene Smith	Natalya Tariq	Game Changers: Stories of Hijabi Athletes from Around the World	Finalist	
2026	Setsuko Thurlow and Kathy Lowinger	Michelle Theodore	Never Silent: A Hiroshima Survivor's Story	Finalist	
2026	Eldon Yellowhorn and Kathy Lowinger	Elizabeth MacLeod	Ours to Tell: Reclaiming Indigenous Stories	Finalist	
2026	Erica Fyvie	Scot Ritchie	The Sustainable School: A Journey Through Time and Energy	Finalist	
2026	Ann Richards	Arden Taylor	The True Story of Vanilla: How Edmond Albius Made History	Finalist	
