= Anne Villeneuve (illustrator) =

Canadian writer and illustrator of children's books

- Born: Montreal, Quebec, Canada
- Education: Dawson College

Anne Villeneuve (1966) is a Canadian writer and illustrator of children's books who lives in Quebec.

== Life ==
She was born in Montreal and studied design and illustration at Dawson College. Villeneuve also has done artwork for scenery for Cirque du Soleil shows, murals for Red Bull and posters for the Dairy Farmers of Canada.

In 2023, she produced a large digital fresco illustrated for the entrance hall of the Maison de Radio-Canada (CBC) in Montreal.

Anne is currently working on her third graphic novel, Trois petits tours pour la Havane, for Nouvelle adresse publishing house, a travel account on the daily life of the Cubans on the island since the covid pandemic.

== Selected works ==
- Arthur's Dad (1991), text by Ginette Anfousse,
- Une gardienne pour Étienne (1998),
- L'Écharpe Rouge (1999), translated as The Red Scarf (2005),
- Me voilà! (2004), text by Nathalie Savaria,
- Le nul et la chipie (2004), text by François Barcelo,
- Chère Traudi (2008),
- Loula et la recette fantasformidable, translated as Loula and the Sister Recipe (2014),
- Loula part pour l'Afrique, translated as Loula is Leaving for Africa (2014),
- Loula et Monsieur le monstre, translated as Loula and Mister Monster (2015),
- Dear Donald Trump (2018), text by Sophie Siers,
- Me, Toma and the concrete garden (2019), text by Andrew Larsen

== Awards ==
- 1998: won a Mr. Christie's Book Award for Une gardienne pour Étienne.
- 1999: won the Governor General's Award for French-language children's illustration for The Red Scarf.
- 1999: won the Prix Québec-Wallonie-Bruxelles de littérature de jeunesse for The Red Scarf.
- 1999: was shortlisted for a Mr. Christie's Book Award for The Red Scarf.
- 2004: won the TD Canadian Children's Literature Award for Le nul et la chipie.
- 2008: won the TD Canadian Children's Literature Award for Chère Traudi.
- 2014: won the Ruth and Sylvia Schwartz Award for Loula is Leaving for Africa.
- 2014: shortlisted for the Amelia Frances Howard-Gibbon Illustrator's Award for Loula is Leaving for Africa.
