= Linda Amyot =

Canadian writer (born 1958)

- Born: June 28, 1958 (age 68); Joliette, Quebec, Canada
- Education: Université du Québec à Montréal
- Occupation: Writer
- Writing career
- Notable awards: TD Canadian Children's Literature Award (2010); Governor General's Award for French-language children's literature (2013)

Linda Amyot (born June 28, 1958) is a Canadian writer living in the Lanaudière region of Quebec.

== Biography ==
Linda Amyot was born in Joliette and earned a master's degree in literary studies at the Université du Québec à Montréal. During the 1980s and 1990s, she published short stories in various Quebec literary magazines such as XYZ, Mœbius, Contre Ciel and Arcade. She works as an editor and a writer of television documentaries and business audiovisual presentations. She also contributes to the literary magazine Nuit blanche.

Amyot helped create the À voix haute organization, which presents live performances by professional comedians of complete works or excerpts of works by Quebec authors. In 2011, she received the Prix à la création artistique awarded by the Conseil des arts et des lettres du Québec.

== Selected works ==
- Ha Long, novel (2004), finalist for the Prix Anne-Hébert and for the Prix Jacqueline-Déry-Mochon
- Quand le cadre ne cadre plus (2006), a TV movie
- La fille d'en face (2010), won the TD Canadian Children's Literature Award and the Prix Jeunesse des libraires du Québec
- Le jardin d'Amsterdam (2013), received the Prix du livre jeunesse des bibliothèques de Montréal and the Governor General's Award for French-language children's literature
- Saint-Élie-de-Légendes (2015), a TV miniseries
