= David Booth Children's and Youth Poetry Award =

Biannual literary award

The David Booth Children's and Youth Poetry Award, established in 2022, is a biannual literary award, administered by the Canadian Children's Book Centre, to recognize the best works of poetry written for children and youth. Board books, picture books, poetry collections, and novels in verse are eligible if they use rhyme, free verse, or other poetic forms.

== Honorees ==
Award winners and finalists
Year	Author	Title	Result	Ref.
2022	Sheree Fitch, with Carolyn Fisher (illus.)	Summer Feet	Winner	
2022	Briana Corr Scott	The Book of Selkie	Finalist	
2022	Kate Inglis, with Josée Bisaillon (illus.)	A Great Big Night	Finalist	
2022	Jordan Scott, with Sydney Smith (illus.)	I Talk Like a River	Finalist	
2022	Robert Heidbreder, with Chelsea O'Byrne (illus.)	Our Corner Store	Finalist	
2022	Khodi Dill, with Awuradwoa Afful (illus.)	Welcome to the Cypher	Finalist	
2024	Shannon Bramer, with Irene Luxbacher (illus.)	Robot, Unicorn, Queen: Poems for You and Me	Winner	
2024	Tonya Simpson, with Carla Joseph (illus.)	Forever Our Hom	Finalist	
2024	Whitney Moran and Josée Bisaillon (illus.)	I Want to Build a Seahouse	Finalist	
2024	Jonathan Bécotte, with Jonathan Kaplansky(trans.)	Like a Hurricane	Finalist	
2024	Heather Camlot, with Sophie Casson (illus.)	The Prisoner and the Writer	Finalist	
2024	James Gladstone, with François Thisdale (illus.)	The Yellow Leaves Are Coming	Finalist	
2026	Vikki VanSickle, with Laura K. Watson (illus.)	The Lightning Circle	Finalist	
2026	Tasha Hilderman, with Maggie Zeng (illus.)	Lights at Night	Finalist	
2026	Caroline Adderson, with Lauren Tamaki (illus.)	A Pond, a Poet, and Three Pests	Finalist	
2026	Danielle Daniel	Reasons to Look at the Night Sky	Finalist	
2026	Shari Green	Song of Freedom, Song of Dreams	Finalist	
2026	Nicholas Ruddock, with Ashley Barron (illus.)	This Is a Tiny Fragile Snake	Finalist	
