= Marianne Dubuc =

Canadian writer and illustrator

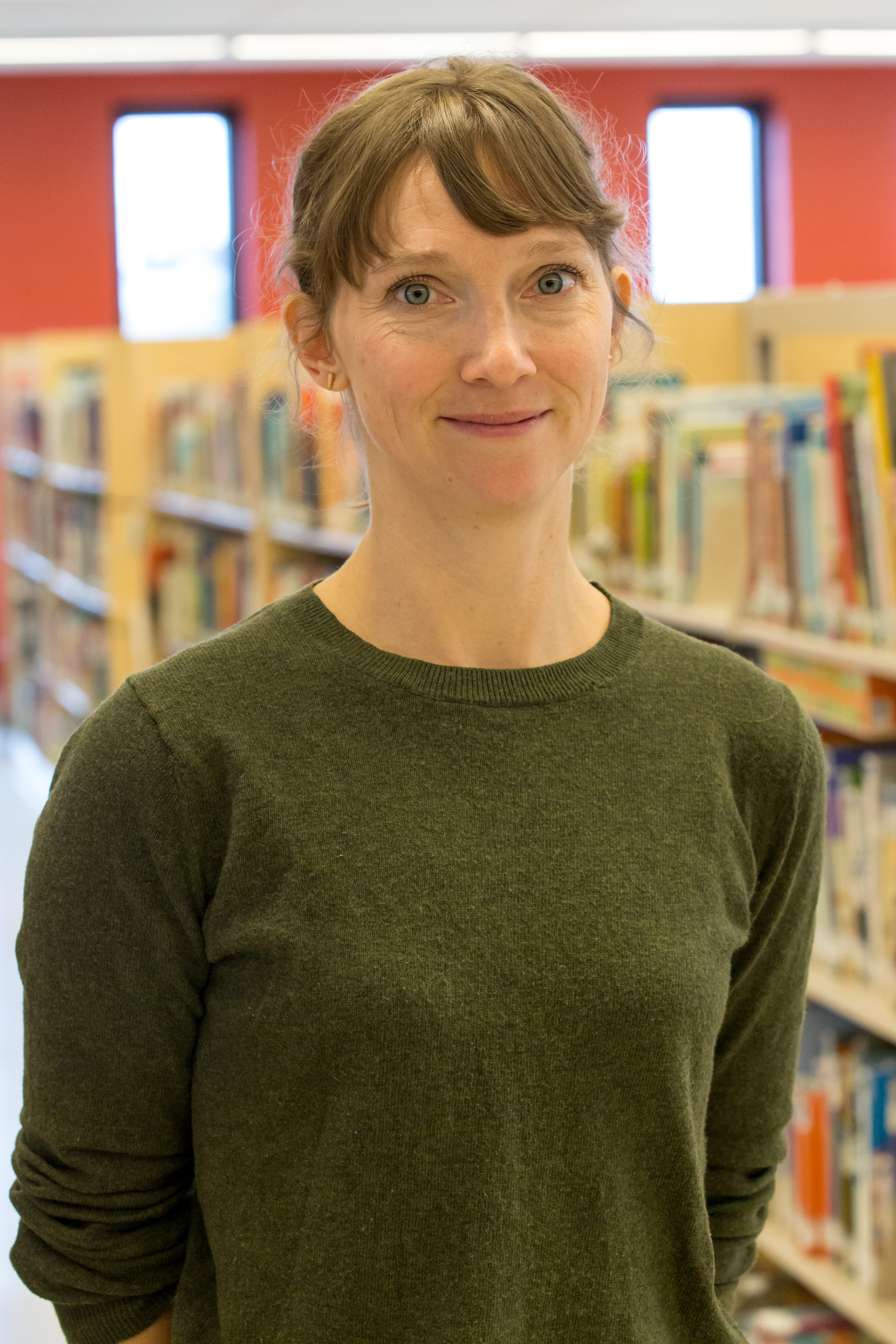
- Marianne Dubuc in 2018
- Born: 1980 (age 45–46); Montreal, Quebec, Canada
- Education: Université du Québec à Montréal
- Occupations: Children's author and illustrator

Marianne Dubuc CM (born 1980) is a Canadian writer and illustrator of children's books living in Quebec.

She was born in Montreal and studied graphic design at the Université du Québec à Montréal.

Her first book was La mer (2006), translated into English as The Sea (2012). Her second book Devant ma maison was translated into more than 15 languages. Her books have since been translated into 25 languages. Dubuc conducted a number of workshops in Montreal libraries as part of the Blue Metropolis festival. In 2015, she was invited to give workshops at the Encuentro Internacional de Ilustración in Valladolid, Spain.

== Selected work ==
- Devant ma maison (2010), translated into English as In Front of my House (2010), named a Best Book for Kids & Teens by the Canadian Children's Book Centre, named an Outstanding Book for Young People with Disabilities by the International Board on Books for Young People
- Au carnaval des animaux (2012), finalist for the Governor General's Award for French-language children's illustration, translated into English as Animal Masquerade (2012), was named Outstanding International Book by the USBBY
- Le lion et l’oiseau (2013), won the Governor General's Award for French-language children's illustration and the Prix Alvine-Bélisle, translated into English as The Lion and the Bird (2014)
- L'autobus (2014), received the TD Canadian Children's Literature Award and the Prix jeunesse des libraires du Québec, translated into English as The Bus Ride (2015), was named Outstanding International Book by the USBBY, the German translation Bus fahren was nominated for the Deutscher Jugendliteraturpreis
- La tournée de Facteur Souris (2015), received the Prix jeunesse des libraires du Québec, translated into English as Mr Postmouse’s Rounds (2015), received the Ruth and Sylvia Schwartz Children's Book Award and was named a Best Picture Book by Kirkus Reviews
- Chacun son tour ! (2022), translated into English as Everyone Gets a Turn in 2024
