= Richard Allen Chase Memorial Award =

Canadian literary award

The Richard Allen Chase Memorial Award is an annual Canadian literary award presented to fiction and non-fiction illustrated books for children ages 9 to 12 with "themes such as compassion, kindness, humanity, environmentalism, inclusivity and/or connection to the land". The award honours the late Richard Allen Chase, an Albertan teacher and librarian. Established as part of the Rocky Mountain Book Awards in 2022, the Richard Allen Chase Memorial Award has been presented by the Canadian Children's Book Centre since 2024. As of 2026, winners receive CA$5,000.

== Honorees ==
Award winners and finalists
Year	Author	Illustrator	Title	Result	Ref.
2024	Paul Tom, trans. by Arielle Aaronson	Mélanie Baillairgé	Alone: The Journeys of Three Young Refugees	Winner	
2024	Afua Cooper	Rebecca Bender	The Halifax Explosion: 6 December 1917, at 9:05 in the Morning	Finalist	
2024	Peggy Janicki	Carrielynn Victor	The Secret Pocket	Finalist	
2024	Mark Sakamoto	Rachel Wada	Shizue's Path	Finalist	
2024	James Gladstone	Yaara Eshet	A Star Explodes: The Story of Supernova 1054	Finalist	
2025	Jennifer Leason, Anishinaabemowin trans. by Norman Chartrand and Jennifer Leason	Jennifer Leason	Hummingbird / Aamo-binashee	Winner	
2025	James Gladstone	Yaara Eshet	I Wonder About Worlds: Discovering Planets and Exoplanets	Finalist	
2025	Erin Silver	Hayden Maynard	Mighty Scared: The Amazing Ways Animals Defend Themselves	Finalist	
2025	Christoper Tse		A Song for the Paper Children	Finalist	
2025	Kathy Kacer	Gabrielle Grimard	Two Pieces of Chocolate	Finalist	
2026	Joanne Kwok	Yiting Hui	Akemi's Song	Finalist	
2026	Qin Leng		Fantastic Lou: Little Comics from Real Life	Finalist	
2026	Elizabeth Merasty, Woodland Cree trans. by Edie Venne	Brie Phillips	kisēwātisi – Be Kind	Finalist	
2026	Todd Stewart		Little Moments in a Big Universe	Finalist	
2026	Guojing		Oasis	Finalist	
