= The Barnabus Project =

Book by The Fan Brothers

- (Illustrated edition)
- Authors: The Fan Brothers, Devin Fan
- Illustrators: The Fan Brothers
- Language: English
- Genres: Children; Fiction
- Published: 2020
- Publisher: Random House of Canada
- Publication place: Canada
- Media type: Print: Hardback; Digital: eBook
- Pages: 72
- Awards: Governor General’s Literary Award; TD Canadian Children’s Literature Award
- ISBN: 9780735263260
- OCLC: 1122792103
- Website: penguinrandomhouse.ca

The Barnabus Project is a children's book written and illustrated by The Fan Brothers Terry and Eric Fan, in collaboration with their youngest brother Devin Fan. Published in 2020 by Random House of Canada, it won the 2020 Governor General’s Literary Award for English-language children's illustration.

== Plot ==
In The Barnabus Project, Barnabus is a genetically-engineered half-mouse and half-elephant, the product of a failed laboratory experiment to create and sell the "perfect pet". Sustained in a bell jar and hidden deep below a Perfect Pet store with other failed pet creations, Barnabus dreams of freedom after being told of a wonderful world beyond the confines of the lab. After learning that they are all to be recycled, plans are set in motion to execute an escape.

== Awards ==
The Barnabus Project won the 2020 Governor General’s Award for English-language children's illustration, and the 2021 TD Canadian Children’s Literature Award.

== Reception ==
The book was generally well received. Tanya Boudreau writes in the School Library Journal, "a fun tale with a big heart, for all ages and all collections." Meghan Cox Gurdon of The Wall Street Journal calls the book "a funny and tender picture book" and calls the artwork "beguiling". Anne Crewdson at the International Examiner expresses, “The storyline is like blades ever-turning and a twist on a timeless tale which remains fresh.”
