= An Island in the Soup =

Book by Mireille Levert

- Front cover illustration
- Author: Mireille Levert
- Illustrator: Mireille Levert
- Cover artist: Mireille Levert
- Language: English
- Genre: Children's Literature
- Publisher: Douglas & McIntyre/Groundwood Books
- Publication date: May 1, 2001
- Publication place: Canada
- Media type: Print (Hardcover & Paperback)
- Pages: 24
- ISBN: 978-0-88899-403-5

An Island in the Soup is a children's book written and illustrated by French-Canadian author Mireille Levert, intended for children ages 3–5. It was first published on May 1, 2001, by Douglas & McIntyre/Groundwood Books. An Island in the Soup is an intriguing tale that provides a fun and imaginative twist on children playing with and in their food and tells a story of fantasy and imagination incorporating both mother and child through a grand dinner time adventure. Mireille Levert won the Governor General's Literary Award for English Illustration for An Island in the Soup in 2001. It is "a wonderful book [...] full of illustrations that delight and stimulate. What sets it apart is the clever and creative journey, which appeals to children of all ages."

== Plot summary ==
Victor of the Noodle, grand knight of the Order of the Macaroni, is at battle in a forest when he is summoned to the dinner table by his ever-patient mother. Here he finds a bowl of the most curious fish soup which he is quite reluctant to eat. He protests it is too dangerous as there is an island in his soup, floating in the middle of his bowl. Riding on top of a soup spoon, he and his Mum adventure to the mysterious island. Along the way, he encounters many obstacles, such as a cheesy swamp filled with huge stinky fish, a storm of giant peas and carrots, a pepper dragon, and the Bad Fairy Zoop who tries to feed the naughty boy his fish soup. But, Mum comes to the rescue and saves Victor. In the end, Victor finds himself starving, so he gobbles up his bowl of soup, which, to his surprise, turns out to be the best soup he's ever had.

== Characters ==
- Victor: Victor is an adventurous, imaginative young boy who is eager to explore his world. When he doesn't want to eat the suspicious fish soup, he creates a distraction using his limitless imagination.
- Victor's Mother: Victor's Mum is patient and smart as she accompanies her son on his adventure in the fish soup. She provides guidance and encouragement when Victor is feeling scared or lost. She enables him to have his own successes, building his self-confidence, and only comes to the rescue when necessary.
- Bad Fairy Zoop: The Bad Fairy Zoop plays the antagonist as she captures Victor and tries to make him eat his soup, prompting Victor's Mum to come to the rescue.

== About the Author/Illustrator ==
Mireille Levert was born on December 20, 1956, in Saint-Jean-sur-Richelieu, Quebec. Levert has been an illustrator and author for more than twenty years. Her vibrant and colourful images are primarily done in watercolour with her playful style bringing stories to life. In addition to being an author and illustrator, she is a batik teacher, bookseller, merchandiser, and artist. From 1997 to 2002, she taught illustration in Montreal at the University of Quebec, where she also obtained her Bachelor of Fine Arts. Levert enjoys bicycling and gardening, as well as the arts, including film, music, and literature. She has won two Governor General's Awards for Children's Illustration, the first in 1993 for her book Sleep Tight, Mrs. Ming, and the second in 2001 for An Island in the Soup, and has been nominated for various other awards. Other children's books by Mireille Levert include:

- Eddie Longpants
- The Princess who had Almost Everything
- Molly Draws
- Molly Counts
- A Wizard in Love
- Rose by Night
- Lucy's Secret

== Awards ==
An Island in the Soup won the Governor General's Award for Children's Illustration in 2001. The Governor General's Literary Awards (sometimes referred to as the GG's) are national literary awards given each year that honour the best in Canadian Literature. Over 1,500 books are submitted from both English and French publishers who represent Canadian authors, illustrators, and translators. There are seven different categories for the awards, which are as follows:

- fiction
- poetry
- drama
- non-fiction
- children's literature-text
- children's literature-illustration
- translation

The final selection for the recipient of the award is chosen by a jury of other authors, illustrators, and translators. Along with the title, each winner receives a $25,000 prize and a special-bound copy of their book.
