= Marthe Jocelyn =

Canadian writer (born 1956)

- Born: 1956 (age 68–69) Toronto, Canada
- Notable awards: TD Canadian Children's Literature Award (2005); Vicky Metcalf Award (2009); Edgar Allan Poe Award for Best Juvenile (2023)
- Spouse: Tom Slaughter
- Children: 2

Website
- marthejocelyn.com

Marthe Jocelyn (born 1956) is a Canadian writer of over forty children's books. In 2009, she received the Vicky Metcalf Award for Literature for Young People, an honour bestowed by the Writers' Trust of Canada to a writer or illustrator whose body of work has been "inspirational to Canadian youth".

== Biography ==
Jocelyn was born in 1956 in Toronto and was raised in Stratford, Ontario. As a teenager, she attended a boarding school in Great Britain. After living in various areas, she settled in New York City, where she lived for thirty years before returning to Stratford.

She is married to Tom Slaughter and has two daughters: Hannah and Nell. Tom and Nell have contributed illustrations to a number of her children's books.

Aside from writing, Jocelyn owned Jesse Design, a "toy and clothing design firm", for fifteen years.

== Awards and honors ==
In 2009, Jocelyn received the Vicky Metcalf Award for Literature for Young People, an honour bestowed by the Writers' Trust of Canada to a writer or illustrator whose body of work has been "inspirational to Canadian youth".

Five of Jocelyn's books are Junior Library Guild selections: Earthly Astonishments (2000), Mable Riley (2004), Folly (2010), The Body under the Piano (2020), and Peril at Owl Park (2021). Two of her books have been included on USBBY's Outstanding International Books List: Would You (2009) and Sam Sorts (2018).

In 2007, the Toronto Public Library included Eats on their "list of the top 10 books of 2007 for children under the age of five". The same year, School Library Journal named How It Happened in Peach Hill one of the best children's books of the year.

Folly was named one of the Kirkus Reviews' best books for teens in 2010, and Bank Street College of Education included it on their 2011 list of the best Historical Fiction for Children Ages 14+.

Awards for Jocelyn's writing
Year	Title	Award	Result	Ref.
2000	Hannah's Collections	Governor General's Award for English-language children's illustration	Finalist	
2005	Mable Riley	ALA Best Fiction for Young Adults	Selection	
2005	Mable Riley	TD Canadian Children's Literature Award	Winner	
2008	How It Happened in Peach Hill	ALA Best Fiction for Young Adults	Selection	
2008	How It Happened in Peach Hill	ALSC Notable Children's Books	Selection	
2010	Which Way?	INDIES Award for Picture Books (Children's)	Finalist	
2011	Scribbling Women	INDIES Award for Young Adult Nonfiction (Children's)	Finalist	
2012	Scribbling Women	Norma Fleck Award for Canadian Children's Non-fiction	Finalist	
2014	Where Do You Look?	Marilyn Baillie Picture Book Award	Finalist	
2015	What We Hide	Amy Mathers Teen Book Award	Winner	
2022	The Dead Man in the Garden	Edgar Allan Poe Award for Best Juvenile	Finalist	
2023	The Seaside Corpse	Crime Writers of Canada Award of Excellence for Best Juvenile or Young Adult Crime Book	Shortlist	
2023	The Seaside Corpse	Edgar Allan Poe Award for Best Juvenile	Winner	

== Selected texts ==
=== Standalone books ===
- Earthly Astonishments (2000)
- Hannah's Collections (2000)
- A Day with Nellie (2002)
- Mable Riley: A Reliable Record of Humdrum, Peril, and Romance (2004)
- One Some Many, illustrated by Tom Slaughter (2004)
- Over Under, illustrated by Tom Slaughter (2005)
- ABC x 3, illustrated by Tom Slaughter (2005)
- How It Happened in Peach Hill (2007)
- Eats, illustrated by Tom Slaughter (2007)
- Ready for Summer (2008)
- Would You (2008)
- Same Same, illustrated by Tom Slaughter (2009)
- Folly (2010)
- Scribbling Women (2011)
- Ones and Twos, illustrated by Nell Jocelyn (2011)
- What We Hide (2014)
- Viminy Crowe's Comic Book, with Richard Scrimger, illustrated by Claudia Dávila (2014)

=== Aggie Morton, Mystery Queen series ===
The Aggie Morton books are illustrated by Isabelle Follath.

- The Body Under the Piano (2020)
- Peril at Owl Park (2020)
- The Dead Man in the Garden (2021)
- The Seaside Corpse (2022)
