= Károly Brocky =

Hungarian painter

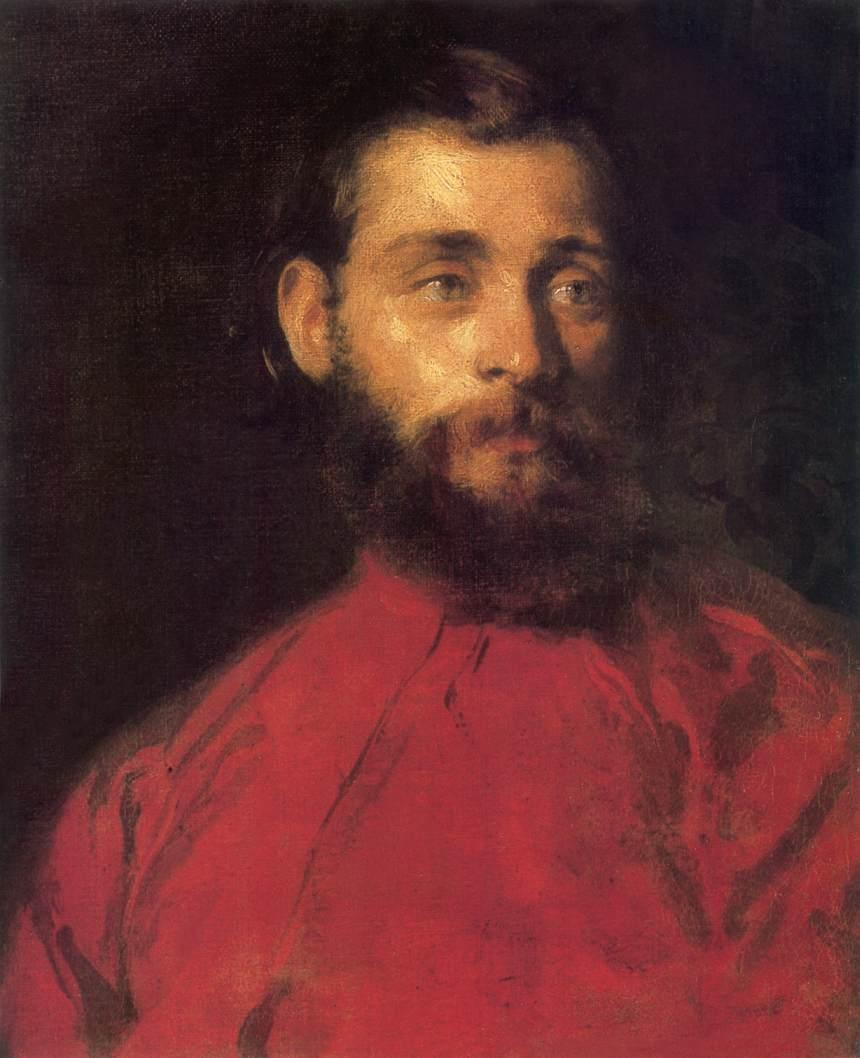
Self portrait, ca. 1850

Károly Brocky, or Charles Brocky (Temesvár, 22 May 1808 – London, 8 July 1855) was a Hungarian painter.

He was the son of a hairdresser, who died whilst his son was still young. To gain a living the youth joined a body of strolling actors. After passing through many vicissitudes, he was at length placed in a free drawing school at Vienna, whence he went to Paris, where he studied at the École du Louvre. When about thirty years of age he visited London, where he took up his abode. His first contribution to the Royal Academy was in 1839, and from that time he exhibited portraits, ideal subjects, and miniatures on ivory somewhat frequently; amongst others a 'Nymph ' (in oil) in 1850, and 'Spring,' 'Summer,' 'Autumn,' and 'Winter' in 1852. He died in 1855. A sketch of his life by Norman Wilkinson was published in 1870.

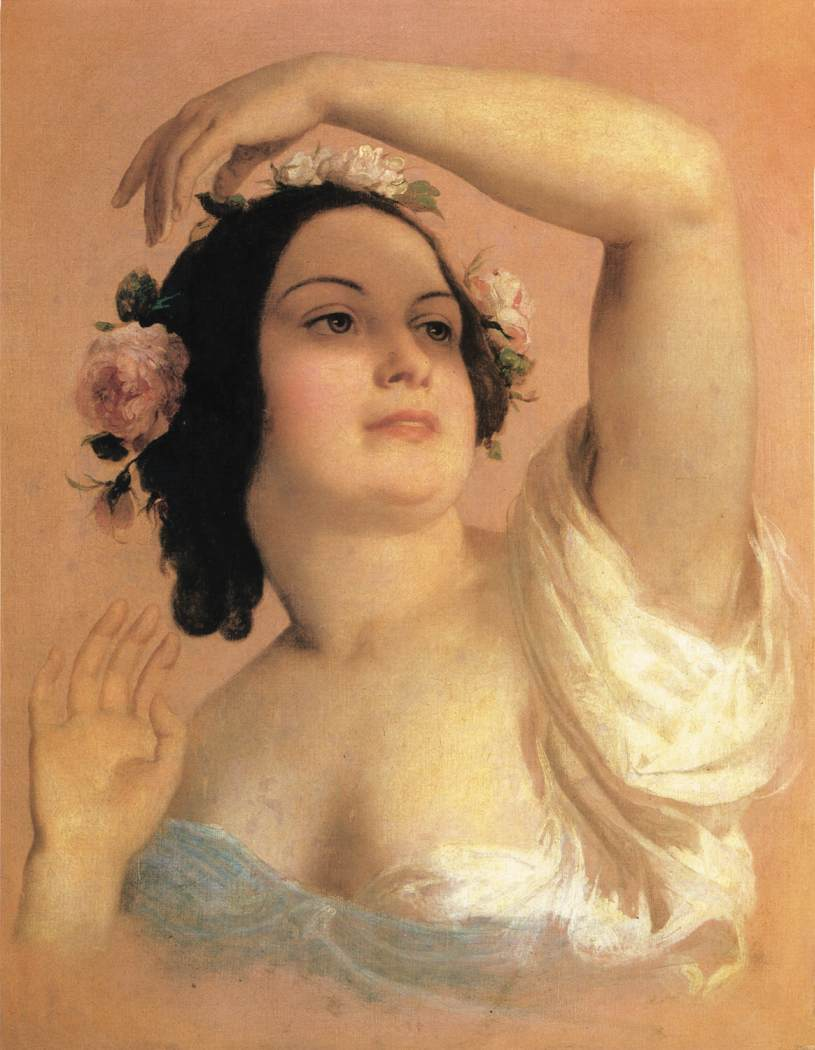
Bust of a Young Woman, Summer, ca. 1846–1850

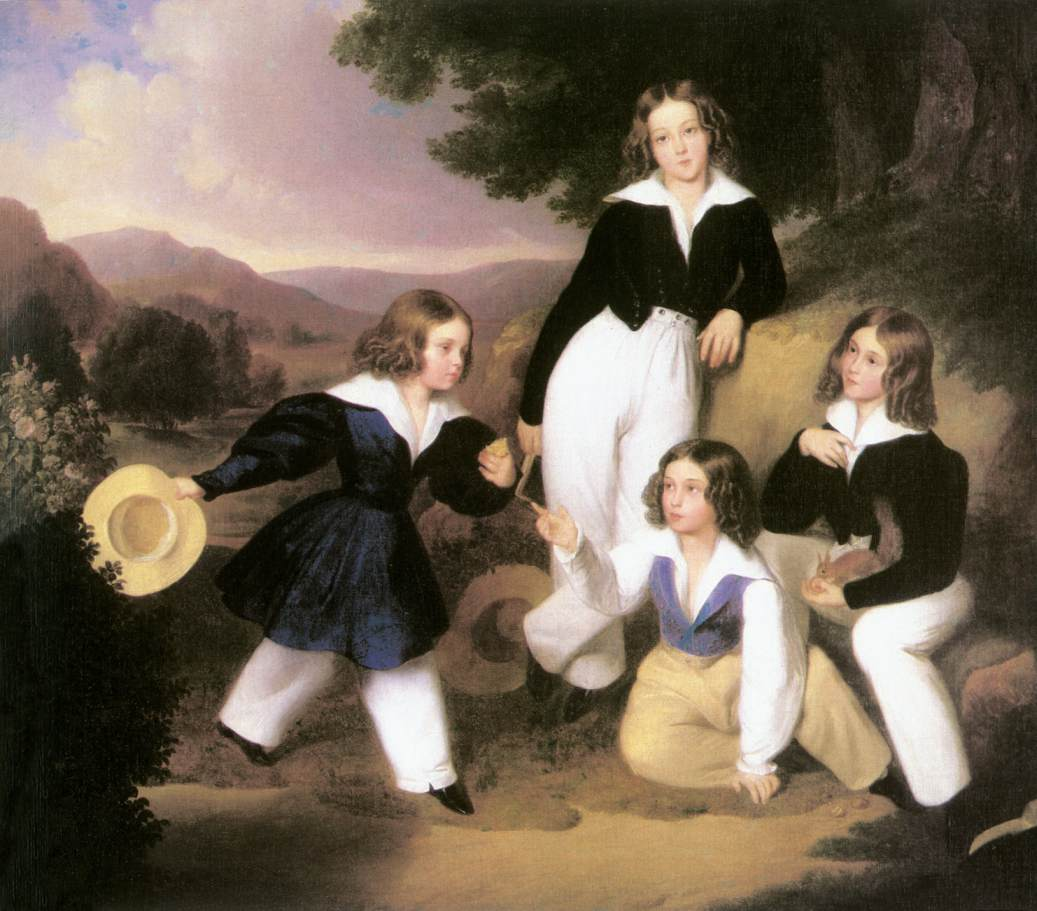
The Sons of István Medgyasszay, ca. 1833

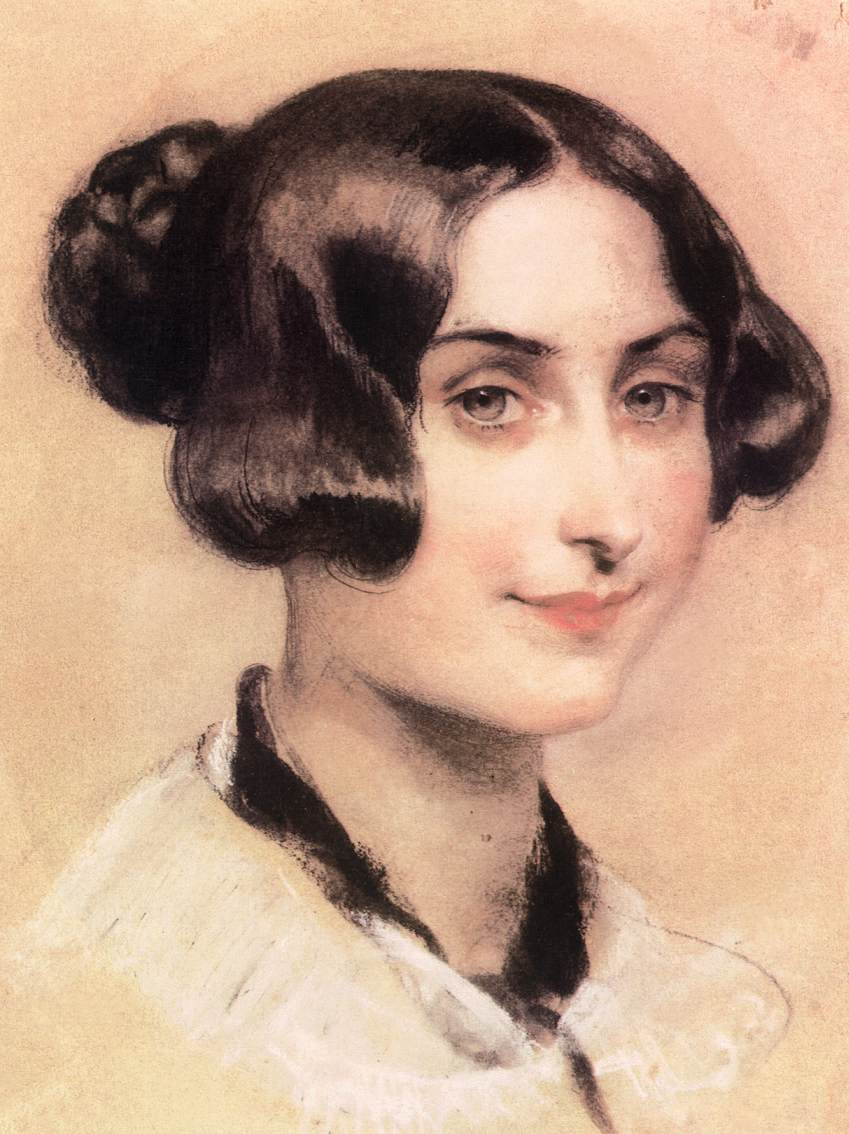
Portrait of Elisabeth Barrett Browning, ca. 1839–1844
