= Michel Noël (writer) =

Canadian poet and writer (1944–2021)

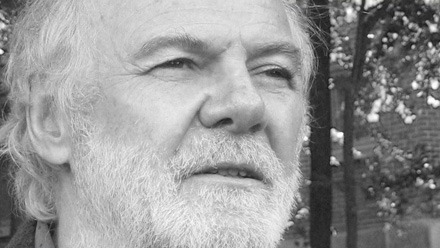

Matchewan Noël CQ (August 17, 1944 – April 12, 2021) was a Canadian civil servant and award-winning writer of Algonquin descent from the Outaouais region of Quebec.

The son of Jean-Marechal Noël, he was born in Messines and grew up in the La Vérendrye Wildlife Reserve and in the Maniwaki and Abitibi regions of Quebec. He received a BEd from the École normale de Hull, then a BA and MA from Laval University. In 1983, he completed a PhD; his thesis was on First Nations gastronomy in the 16th and 17th centuries.

From 1977 to 1980, Noël was director of the Service de l'artisanat et des métiers d'art for the Quebec Ministry of Culture. He continued to serve in various positions in the same department and most recently has been a coordinator for First Nations affairs.

In terms of creative output, he wrote novels, poetry, reference works, stories and plays for young audiences and articles which have appeared in various specialty magazines. During the 1980s, Noël wrote an acclaimed series of books based on First Nations stories, Les Papinachois. He was also a narrator for several films. Noël led workshops in schools, colleges and universities, and taken part in various conferences on First Nations issues.

He was named a chevalier in the French Ordre des Arts et des Lettres in 2003 for promoting French language and culture. In 1998, he was named a Global Citizen by the United Nations Association in Canada. In 2008, he was awarded the Prix Saint-Exupéry in the Francophonie category. He was named a chevalier in the National Order of Quebec in 2011. In 2012, Noël was a finalist for the Astrid Lindgren Memorial Award.

== Selected works ==
Sources:

- Pien, youth fiction (1996), in 1997, received the Governor General's Award for French-language children's literature
- La ligne de trappe (1998), received the Prix Alvine-Bélisle
- Journal d’un bon à rien (1999), translated as Good for nothing (2004), received the Geoffrey Bilson Award
- Le cœur sur la braisse (2000)
- Hiver indien (2001)
- Le Kitchimanitou (2003)
- Hush! Hush! (2004)
- Nishka (2009), finalist for a Governor General's Award
- À la recherche du bout du monde (2012), received the TD Canadian Children's Literature Award
- Métis (2019)
