= The Crazy Man =

2005 Canadian children's novel by Pamela Porter

- First edition
- Author: Pamela Porter
- Cover artist: Karine Daisay (design)
- Language: English
- Genre: Children's literature
- Publisher: Groundwoods Books/House of Anansi Press (first edition)
- Publication date: 2005
- Publication place: Canada
- Media type: Print (hardback & paperback)
- Pages: 214 pp (first edition)

The Crazy Man is a 2005 Canadian children's novel by Pamela Porter. This realistic family novel told in free verse has received many awards and was selected for the Governor General's Literary Award.

The story is about a girl named Emaline who lives on a farm. Her family falls apart after a tractor accident. After chasing her beloved dog, Emaline's father accidentally runs over her leg with a tractor, leaving her permanently disabled. Because of his guilt, Emaline's father shoots her dog, Prince, and ends up leaving Emaline and her mother on their own. The narrative follows Emaline as she deals with prejudice, fear, her disability, and the absence of her father.

== Plot summary ==
The Crazy Man is set in 1965 in Saskatchewan, Canada. Porter reinforces the harsh times by incorporating day-to-day life during the Vietnam War, Communism, and the Cold War. Financial times are tough.

The novel begins by introducing the protagonist Emaline, a twelve-year-old girl who loves playing with friends and going to school. She lives on a farm, when she is involved in a tractor accident. While trying to save her dog, Prince, from being run over by the tractor her father is driving, her leg is caught in the machine, and she is left disabled. Grief-stricken, Emaline's father, Cal, shoots Prince, then leaves everything behind: the family farm, his family, his crippled child, and all his responsibilities. He blames himself for Emaline's injuries, but he also blames the dog for precipitating the accident.

Emaline cannot understand why her father would do this to her and her mother. She wonders why her father left and when her father would come back: "I think about dad. How in the world could someone just disappear?" She blames herself, and her guilt consumes her thoughts.

With Cal gone, Emaline's mother, Clarice, has to find someone else to seed the fields for them, as farming is the family's only source of income. She ends up hiring a big man called Angus, a former mental patient from the mental hospital. This infuriates the town, as they assume that this man will harm and terrorize them.

Emaline's mom tells her, "That man is from the mental, stay away from him."

The townspeople purposely drive by Emaline's house to tease and laugh at the "Crazy Man" working in the farm fields. Frank, the town mechanic, drives by daily and yells, "I hear you have a sub-human out there", and others call Angus the "Gorilla."

What the townspeople do not realize is that Angus is a gentle and caring individual who would not hurt anyone or anything. He is a good farmer and great gardener. He treats everything he touches with respect. However, the townspeople can not see past his mental illness, and on many occasions they accuse him of stealing from the local grocery store, later to find out that all accusations are false.

After Harry Record (Joey Record's father) drives Angus to the other end of town in attempt to make him suffer in a snowstorm, Angus comes across Joey freezing in the snow on his way back to the town. Despite the mistreatment Angus has experienced, he takes Joey to the hospital to save his life. After the townspeople hear what Angus has done, they realize that Angus is not only like everyone else, but is actually a brave and compassionate individual.

The novel ends with the farm's fields growing beautifully, the best they have ever grown, and Emaline, Clarice, and Angus happily dancing under the Northern Lights without Cal, enjoying life as they once had before the tractor accident.

The main message of the novel is to treat every individual with respect, regardless of their background or appearance.

== Awards ==
The Crazy Man has won awards including the Governor General's Literary Award, the Canadian Library Association Book of the Year Award, the Bilson Award for Historical Fiction, and the TD Canadian Children's Literature Award.

== Characters ==
- Cal Bitterman - Emaline's Father and Clarice’s husband. Cal shoots and burns the family dog after Emaline has an accident with the farm tractor. Cal blames himself for the accident. Cal leaves everything behind without any notice and goes to work the railroad. He has no contact with his family after he leaves.
- Prince - The family dog which Emaline loves.
- Clarice - Emaline's mother and wife to Cal.
- Emaline - Protagonist and narrator of the novel. The story is based around her and her feelings around Angus and her father.
- Reverend Douglas - Preacher and mayor of Saskatchewan, passes a law in order to have Emaline's hospital fees paid for by the government.
- Miss Sadie Tollfsen - Emaline's sixth grade teacher who visits her while in the hospital and encourages her artwork. She is Emaline's teacher and friend.
- Jamie Record - Son of Harry and Vida Record, school friend and neighbor of Emaline.
- Joey Record - Son of Harry and Vida Record, school friend and neighbor of Emaline's. Joey almost dies from a blizzard before Angus saves him.
- Harry Record - Parent of Jamie and Joey, husband of Vida. Harry strongly dislikes Angus and attempts to murder Angus.
- Vida Record - Wife and mother of Harry, Jamie, and Joey.
- Mei Wang - Emaline's friend from school. She and her family are Chinese.
- Dr. Phillips - Emaline's doctor who works with Emaline to heal her broken leg from the tractor accident.
- Angus - "The Crazy Man" hired by Clarice to seed the farm when her husband walks out on them. Angus suffers from a mental illness and is not well received from the town until the end of the novel.
- Frank - Town mechanic who drives by the farm only to taunt Angus and the family.
- Mr. McGilivary - Town grocer who accuses Angus of stealing.
- D’Arcy Pettit - Chief constabulary officer (RCMP)
- Miss Griffin - Town librarian.
- Mr. Sidlosk - Angus’s doctor from the mental hospital. He helps Angus build a shoe for Emaline so she can walk properly.
- Louise - Secretary at El Rancho Motel, where Emaline's father Cal stays after he leaves the family.
- Mr. Liddle - Emaline's seventh grade teacher who encourages her to volunteer at an animal shelter.
- Mrs. Spiske - the owner of the animal shelter where Emaline volunteers.
- Meeka - Emaline's new dog (after Prince) which she gets from the animal shelter where she volunteers.
