= Jenny Kay Dupuis =

Anishinaabe-Canadian author

Jenny Kay Dupuis is an Anishinaabe-Canadian author, artist, and educator. Her books include I Am Not A Number and Heart Berry Bling, both of which centre the experiences of Anishinaabek people, discussing the Indian Act and residential schooling.

Dupuis is a member of the Nipissing First Nation and as of 2019, lived in Toronto. She has a Bachelor of Arts in history and visual arts, a Master of Education in special education, and a "doctorate in educational leadership from the University of Calgary".

== I Am Not A Number (2016) ==
Dupuis's debut children's book, I Am Not A Number, was published by Second Story Press in 2016. It is co-written by Canadian author Kathy Kacer and illustrated by Canadian artist Gillian Newland. The book has been published in English, French, and Nishnaabemwin with help from members of the Nipissing First Nation.

I Am Not a Number is based on the experiences of Dupuis's grandmother, Irene Couchie, who was forced into residential schooling at age eight and, among other attempts to have her forget her ancestry, is forbidden to speak her native language, Nishnaabemwin. While in residential school, Irene is referred to as a number rather than her name. When she returns home for the summer, her parents decide they will not allow Irene or her siblings to return to the school, meaning they must hide them from government officials.

I Am Not a Number is a Junior Library Guild book. In 2017, it was named one of the year's best children's books by Bank Street College of Education, Association for Library Service to Children, and the Co-operative Children’s Book Centre. It was also a finalist for the 2017 Marilyn Baillie Picture Book Award.

Despite positive critical reception, some parents found that the book's contents were inappropriate for children, especially when used as required reading without a trigger warning. In response to such concerns, Dupuis stated "she was careful about reflecting the truth of what happened to her grandmother, while staying age appropriate".

== Heart Berry Bling (2023) ==
Dupuis's second children's book, Heart Berry Bling, illustrated by Eva Campbell, was published by HighWater Press in 2023.

In the book, a young girl named Maggie visits her grandmother. During the visit, the two make beaded strawberry earrings, with Granny guiding Maggie through the traditional beadwork process. Granny also shares lessons associated with strawberries, also known as heart berries, discusses Indigenous history related to the Indian Act, and explores the interrelationship between the three.

In 2024, the American Library Association included Heart Berry Bling on their Rise: A Feminist Book Project list.

== Publications ==
- Dupuis, Jenny Kay; Kacer, Kathy (2016). I Am Not A Number. Illustrated by Gillian Newland. Second Story Press. ISBN 978-1-927-58394-4.
- Dupuis, Jenny Kay (2023). Heart Berry Bling. Illustrated by Eva Campbell. HighWater Press.
