= Pamela Porter =

Canadian novelist and poet (born 1956)

- Born: Pamela Paige Porter; July 14, 1956 (age 70); Albuquerque, New Mexico, United States
- Occupation: Writer
- Spouse: Rob Porter
- Children: 2
- Writing career
- Period: 2002–present
- Genres: Poetry, children's fiction
- Notable work: The Crazy Man

Pamela Paige Porter (born July 14, 1956) is a Canadian novelist and poet. She was born in Albuquerque, New Mexico and has also lived in Texas, Louisiana, Washington, and Montana. She emigrated to Canada with her husband Rob Porter, from the fourth generation of a Saskatchewan farm family, and resides in North Saanich, British Columbia. She has received praise for her young adult novels, especially The Crazy Man. Her poetry has won the Prism International Poetry Prize and the Vallum Magazine Poetry Prize, and has appeared in literary magazines in Canada and the United States.

== Biography ==
=== Early life ===
Porter lived in Albuquerque, New Mexico until halfway through kindergarten. Her father, who worked for an insurance company, was transferred, and then the family moved to Dallas, Texas. When Porter was 12 years old, her father was transferred to Monroe, Louisiana, where she attended Robert E. Lee Junior High. She remembers her school as being very strict; she had to address all her elders as "Yes, Ma'am, No, Ma'am, Yes, Sir, No, Sir." She was first introduced to racism at her school when everyone treated the African American staff with no respect by calling them by their first names and playing around with them. She recalls becoming very interested in world politics and the civil rights movement by watching the evening news every day.

Porter was first introduced to poetry while flipping through the back of her English language arts book in class. She picked up books from the library, books of poetry and pieces that usually were short, the length she felt she could read. She was also introduced to poems by Robert Frost, particularly "Desert Places". She believed she was always destined to be an author, and remembers always wanting to play the game "Authors" instead of "Scrabble" as a child.

=== Later life ===
Porter finished her undergraduate degree at Southern Methodist University. She holds an MFA in poetry writing from the University of Montana. When she first entered university, she was very interested in languages. She studied the German language for a few years and was interested in becoming fluent in some other languages and becoming a translator.

Porter was 19 years old when she took her first writing course with John Skoyles. Other teachers were Jack Myers, Richard Hugo, and later Lorna Crozier and Patrick Lane. Soon after earning her MFA, she was awarded a scholarship to attend the Bread Loaf Writer's Conference in Vermont.

Porter met her husband in a bell choir. She and Rob traveled a lot together before having children; they lived in Sunspot, New Mexico, and then moved to Seattle before moving to Ulm, Montana to be closer to Rob's family, who were in Calgary. The family now resides near Sidney, British Columbia.

Porter has been a professor at the University of Victoria as a sessional instructor.

For generations, Rob's family has gone to Saskatchewan every summer to work on the farm.

== Analysis ==
=== Influences ===
Pamela Porter has said that her first influence was the Bible. She was raised in a family of stalwart Presbyterians who were strict followers of their religion. She learned to read at the age of five as her father held his finger beneath the words in a hymn book. She has early memories of hearing the King James Bible read aloud; this gave her an introduction to literature and diverse vocabulary at a young age.

Porter's second influence was Robert Frost. She has said that The Complete Poems of Robert Frost was the only book of literature in her house; her mother received it as a gift. No one had opened it until Porter pulled the book down from a high shelf and began to read it.

Other influences on Porter include Li-Young Lee, Carolyn Forché, Lorna Crozier, and Patrick Lane. She leans towards "poets who make effortless music with language while still holding their humanity close."

=== Cultural impact ===
Porter's work has had a great impact on juvenile audiences. Young readers voted The Crazy Man across Canada as their favourite book of the year. Her books are distinguishable from other children books as their themes deal with real-life issues and are often based on serious subjects, and are written in verse rather than conventional prose. They involve difficult and challenging experiences that children have encountered or will encounter in their lives, and are stories that many children can relate to.

She has also been involved with rescuing animals, including dogs, cats, horses, and a rabbit, and taking them in as her own. Porter said her love for animals was always in her, and she began to adopt animals while living on a ranch in Montana.

== Works ==
=== Children's fiction ===
- Sky (Toronto: Groundwood Books, 2004)
- The Crazy Man (Toronto: Groundwood Books, 2005)
- I'll Be Watching (Toronto: Groundwood Books, 2011)

=== Children's picture books ===
- Yellow Moon, Apple Moon, illustrated by Matt James (Toronto: Groundwood Books, 2008)

=== Poetry ===
- Poems for the Luminous World (Victoria, BC: Frog Hollow Press, 2002)
- Stones Call Out (Regina, SK: Coteau Books, 2006)
- The Intelligence of Animals (Omaha, NE: The Backwaters Press, 2008)
- Cathedral (Vancouver: Ronsdale Press, 2010)
- No Ordinary Place (Vancouver: Ronsdale Press, 2012)
- Late Moon (Vancouver: Ronsdale Press, 2013)
- House Made of Rain (Vancouver: Ronsdale Press, 2014)
- Defending Darkness (Vancouver: Ronsdale Press, 2016)
- Likely Stories (Vancouver: Ronsdale Press, 2019)

=== Translations of her works ===
- 노란 달, 사과 달 (Seoul: Glbburi, 2008) (a translation of Yellow Moon, Apple Moon)
- 어느 날 그가 왔다 (Seoul: Sanha Publishing Co., 2012) (a translation of The Crazy Man)
- Lune jaune, à bientôt (Toronto: Groundwood Books, 2014) (a translation of Yellow Moon, Apple Moon)

== Awards ==
=== For The Crazy Man ===
- 2005 Governor General's Award for Children's Literature
- 2006 Canadian Library Association Book of the Year for Children
- 2006 TD Canadian Children's Literature Award
- 2006 Geoffrey Bilson Historical Fiction Award for Children
- 2006 Jane Addams Foundation Honor Book
- 2006 Texas Institute of Letters Friends of the Austin Public Library Award for Young Adult Book
- 2007 Hackmatack Children's Choice Book Award
- 2007 Manitoba Young Readers' Choice Award
- 2007 OLA Golden Oak Award
- 2007 Rocky Mountain Book Award
- 2008 Red Cedar Book Award

=== For other works ===
- 2009 New Mexico Book Award for Yellow Moon, Apple Moon
- 2010 Vallum Magazine Poem of the Year Award
- 2011 Prism International Grand Prize for Poetry
- 2011 Pat Lowther Award in Poetry finalist for Cathedral
- 2012 FreeFall Magazine Poetry Award
