= Kim LaFave =

Canadian children's book illustrator and artist

Kim LaFave (born 12 January 1955) is a Canadian children's book illustrator and artist. LaFave started his illustration career in media before his first children's drawings appeared in the 1981 book The Mare's Egg. From the 1980s to 2000s, his drawings appeared in over 40 children's books. As an artist, LaFave painted landscapes, boats and snow from the 2000s to 2020s. He also was a member of Eleven Equal Artists during the 2010s.

For his illustrations, LaFave won the 1988 Governor General's Award for English-language children's illustration and 1989 Amelia Frances Howard-Gibbon Illustrator's Award for Amo's Sweater. As a nominee, LaFave received additional Governor General's nominations in 2001 with We'll All Go Sailing and 2004 with A Very Unusual Dog. In 1990, he received an Amelia Frances Howard-Gibbon nomination for Duck Cakes for Sale. From 2008 to 2011, LaFave received nominations for both of these awards with Shin-chi's Canoe and Fishing With Gubby.

== Early life and education ==
On 12 January 1955, LaFave was born in Vancouver, British Columbia. During his childhood, LaFave began to draw before he became a newspaper illustrator in high school. During the 1970s, LaFave studied graphic design at Capilano College before attending the Alberta College of Art. After finishing his college studies in 1976, LaFave went to Tarrytown, New York that year to receive additional illustrative training.

== Career ==
During the late 1970s, LaFave worked as an illustrator for Vancouver magazines before continuing his illustrative career with publishing companies in Toronto. In 1981, LaFave started illustrating children's books with The Mare's Egg. Between the 1980s and 2000s, LaFave's drawings appeared in over 40 books for children. Of his works, LaFave contributed illustrations to several books by Paulette Bourgeois and Sheryl McFarlane. In the 1990s, LaFave left Toronto for Western Canada. While in British Columbia, LaFave worked in Sunshine Coast with Nightwood Editions as their owner.

Leading up to the early 2000s, LaFave worked as a digital painter and had his artwork appear in The New York Times. During the 2000s, LaFave resumed his career as a landscape painter while working on a book about fishing. In 2005, some of his paintings that were displayed in Gibsons included ones on Molly's Reach and Gambier Island. Throughout the early 2010s, LaFave started creating paintings of boats using acrylic paint. His boat paintings were held in Gibsons and Bowen Island leading up to 2020. He also had paintings of snow displayed at The Kube Gallery in 2018. As a group artist, LaFave was part of Eleven Equal Artists throughout the 2010s.

== Designs and themes ==
With his drawings, LaFave draws out rough ideas while reading the book he is working on. Following his developed illustrations in pencil, LaFave finishes his works with paint. During this process, LaFave adds layers of watercolour onto his drawings for the majority of his illustrations. In other works, LaFave used oil paint for The Mare's Egg and acrylic paint for Follow That Star. With paint, LaFave focuses on all of the back and front parts of the images first before moving on to the literary characters. In 2001, LaFave expanded his children's illustrations methods with digital painting when he used Fractal Painter for We'll All Go Sailing. For Shin-chi's Canoe, LaFave conducted research on the Canadian Indian residential school system to make his illustrations.

While painting landscapes, LaFave initially used dark and neutral colours before expanding into brighter colours. With his nautical paintings in the 2010s, LaFave used photos he took of docked boats as a reference. In the finished painting, LaFave incorporated several versions of his photos while emphasizing parts of the boats. By the late 2010s, LaFave's paintings also included works on architecture.

== Honours and personal life ==
At the 1988 Governor General's Awards, LaFave won the Governor General's Award for English-language children's illustration with Amo's Sweater. In the early 2000s, LaFave was nominated for this award with We'll All Go Sailing in 2001 and A Very Unusual Dog in 2004. Additional Governor General's nominations for his illustrations came in 2008 for Shin-chi's Canoe and 2011 for Fishing with Gubby. With the Amelia Frances Howard-Gibbon Illustrator's Award, LaFave was the 1989 recipient for Amo's Sweater. He was re-nominated for this Canadian Library Association award the following year with Duck Cakes for Sale. Additional nominations were in 2009 for Shin-chi's Canoe and 2011 for Fishing With Gubby.

During this time period, LaFave shared the 1989 Ruth Schwartz Children's Book Award for Amo's Sweater with Janet Lunn. With Nicola I. Campbell, LaFave received Marilyn Baillie Picture Book Award nominations for Shi-shi-etko in 2006 and Shin-chi's Canoe during 2009. For the TD Canadian Children's Literature Award, they were nominated with Shi-shi-etko and won with Shin-chi's Canoe. They were nominees for a Ruth and Sylvia Schwartz Children's Book Award with Shi-shi-etko. As the illustrator for Campbell's book titled Grandpa's Girls, LaFaye was a Christie Harris Illustrated Children's Literature Prize nominee as part of the 2012 BC Book Prizes. LaFave is married and has two children.
