= Marie-Danielle Croteau =

Marie-Danielle Croteau (born August 1, 1953)now 71 years is a Canadian writer of youth literature living in Quebec and Central America.

She was born in Saint-Élie-d'Orford (now Sherbrooke) in the Estrie region and studied communications and art history in university. She worked as a journalist, as a researcher and radio columnist for Radio-Canada and was Chief Information Officer for the Montreal Museum of Fine Arts. She has travelled to Africa, to France, to the Antilles, to Polynesia and to Central America. She has participated in various book shows in Quebec and France and was the guest of honour at the Salon du livre de Montréal in 1999. Her books have been translated into English, Portuguese, Chinese and Créole.

== Selected works ==
Sources:

- Un vent de liberté (1993), received the Prix Saint-Exupéry
- Un monde à la dérive (1994), finalist for a Governor General's Award
- Le chat de mes rêves (1994), illustrations by Bruno St-Aubin, translated into English by Sarah Cummins as Fred's dream cat (1995)
- Un pas dans l’éternité (1997), finalist for the Prix Brive/Montréal
- La grande aventure d'un petit mouton noir (1999), illustrations by Geneviève Côté, translated into English by Sheila Fischman as The amazing story of the little black sheep (1999)
- Un gnome à la mer (2002), received an award from the Alcuin Society of Vancouver, translated into English by Sheila Fischman as Gnome overboard (2002)
- L'autobus colère (2003), illustrations by Sophie Casson, received a Mr. Christie's Book Award
- Le coeur de monsieur Gauguin (2004), illustrated by Isabelle Arsenault, received the Governor General's Award for French-language children's illustration
