= Heart Berry Bling =

2023 children's book by Jenny Key Dupuis

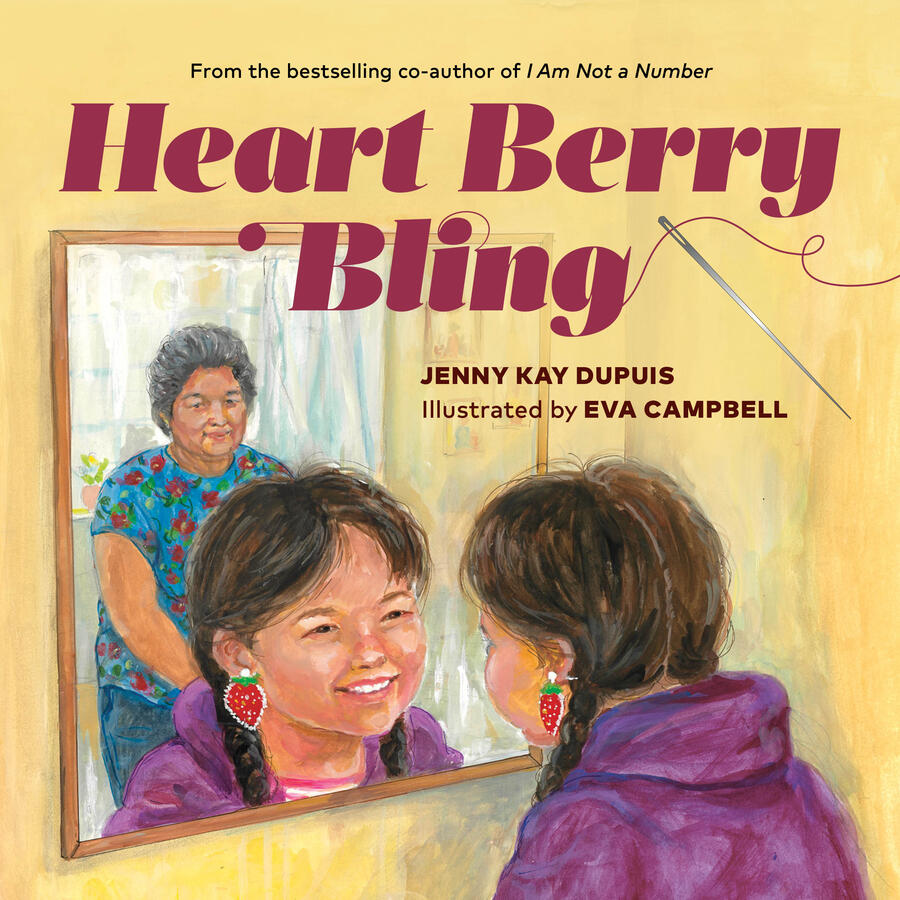
- Author: Jenny Kay Dupuis
- Illustrator: Eva Campbell
- Language: English
- Genre: Children's Literature
- Publisher: Portage & Main Press
- Publication date: May 9, 2023
- Publication place: Canada
- ISBN: 978-1-774-92055-8

Heart Berry Bling is a 2023 illustrated children’s book written by Jenny Kay Dupuis, illustrated by Eva Campbell, and published by Portage & Main Press. The story follows a young Anishinaabe girl named Maggie visiting her grandmother and learning about the culture of beadwork. Maggie, an eager pupil, decides to make a pair of strawberry earrings as her first project, and her grandmother guides her through this process. Granny describes the history of The Indian Act and the First Nations (Indigenous Peoples) as well as the importance of connecting to and remembering one’s identity. She tells her granddaughter how beadwork helped her persevere through being forced out of her home after losing her First Nations status by marrying someone without this status.

Heart Berry Bling won the CBC Favorites Award in 2023 and was commended for the Bookstagang Best of 2023 Picture Book Awards in 2023.

== Plot ==
Heart Berry Bling highlights multiple aspects of native history and culture such as the food, Anishinaabe language, their suffering under Canada’s Indian Act, and – most importantly, the traditional art of beading.

The story starts with a young girl named Maggie going to visit her Granny in the city with her dad. She excitedly daydreams about her grandmother's jar of colorful beads on the drive there. Granny happily greets her by offering fry bread and hot chili to Maggie, but instead she opts for a peanut butter, banana, and bacon sandwich.

Her dad leaves to run errands in the city, and while he is gone, Granny teaches Maggie the essentials to Anishinaabe beading and the stories that the beads can tell. She pulls out examples of her work such as moccasins, jewelry, belts, and bags to show her granddaughter. The pair sits in the living room, admiring the colorful beads and finished products. During this time, she also shows Maggie photographs of herself when she lived on a reservation. She describes the Indian Act and the loss of her First Nations status after marrying Maggie’s grandfather who was not First Nations. She tells her how unfair this was because the men of her community did not have to give up their identity if they married someone not belonging to the First Nations.

After learning about this history, Maggie is inspired to bead an intricate pair of strawberry earrings. While beading, Granny talks about how her Auntie Jeannie taught her to bead, and how beading can be a way of preserving history, traditions, and stories. The 7 teachings of Anishinaabe culture are described: Truth, love, respect, trust, acceptance, peace, and hope. Maggie traces her design onto stiff fabric and cuts them out, admiring the heart shape of the berries. Granny threads red beads onto a needle and waxy thread, walking Maggie through each step of the beading process.

Through much trial, error, and learning, Maggie finishes beading her strawberry earrings with the help of Granny. Her dad returns from his errands, and Maggie proudly displays them to him.

== Themes ==
=== Indigenous Culture ===
One of the primary themes exhibited in Jenny Kay Dupuis’ Heart Berry Bling is the importance of Indigenous culture and passing down traditions through generations in order to preserve and celebrate the culture. Dupuis is Anishinaabek and aims to raise the underheard voices of Indigenous people using children’s literature. In this book, Granny shows her granddaughter, Maggie, the art of Anishinaabe beading, which is a vital part of Indigenous culture. Beadwork also helped Granny persevere and connect to her identity as she faced the Indian Act, a brutal period for Indigenous people and culture, especially women. As she teaches Maggie the ways of beading, she also explains her history, showing Maggie the importance of learning about her identity and family. Dupuis explains that even though this can be a hard subject to talk about, it is crucial for school systems to uphold their educational standards to be able to tackle these topics: “Educators really need to ask themselves what the intent of these systems are, and that’s to really prepare students to be culturally competent and responsive in terms of thinking about how they are going to interact with others in a very respectful and meaningful way without oppressing others, and so literature can actually help.”

One review of Heart Berry Bling examines Indigenous beading as a valuable way to reclaim cultural identity: “Research findings show that learning, teaching and practising Indigenous crafting is associated with increased intergenerational cohesion, cultural connectedness, and well-being for both teachers and learners. Further, learning about Indigenous crafts and activities helps inspire pride in Indigenous identity and promotes healing from historical trauma.”

The presence of Anishinaabe culture is prevalent in other ways throughout the book such as the food offered by Granny (fry bread, hot chili, and fry bread sandwiches) and the Anishinaabe language as it is spoken by Granny and her sister over the phone. Dupuis worked with the illustrator, Eva Campbell, to create a familiar setting with these small details based on her own life: “We decided to model a woman like my Granny. I gave photos of my grandmother, the types of clothing she would have worn back in that day, thinking of the eighties with the hair styles."

Dupuis referenced personal aspects of her own life through this book as she describes in the author's note: "Heart Berry Bling brings together some of my own real-life experiences and those of many others in a story that touches on how the rights of thousands of First Nations women in Canada and their families were taken by the Indian Act."

=== Family ===
Another prominent theme within Heart Berry Bling is the theme of family and the importance of connection between family. Dupuis speaks about this in an interview on the topic of building family and community: "When it comes to Indigenous art forms or Indigenous artwork, I think of it as really helping us to really reinforce our cultural values and our identity". Maggie and her Granny have a bond which is strengthened through their day spent together as Granny teaches Maggie about the Anishinaabe culture through teaching beadwork to her granddaughter.

Heart Berry Bling also shows the importance of familial history, specifically understanding the history of one’s culture. This is shown as Granny describes her history with the Indian Act and loss of her First Nations status to Maggie. Dupuis examines this in the author's note and shows the effect of the Indian Act on generations of family members, explaining how people lost or gained status through marriage. Dupuis was not able to acquire her First Nations status until 2011, and she explains the long-lasting impact of the Indian Act on families. She then acknowledges where her family came from, specifically her grandmother who Granny was based on.

A review from John P. Broome describes Heart Berry Bling as “a soulful children’s story that reminds readers of not only the importance of family and culture, but also the generational harm caused by laws against Indigenous Peoples". He further states that "Jenny Kay Dupuis has created an important text for anyone learning of the erased ancestral stories from and about Indigenous Peoples.”
