= Jackie Traverse =

Canadian Ojibwe artist and activist

- Born: September 30, 1969 (age 56); Winnipeg, Manitoba, Canada
- Education: School of Fine Arts at the University of Manitoba
- Known for: Painter in acrylic, oil and mixed media, stop-motion animator

Jackie Traverse (born September 30, 1969) is an Indigenous (or Aboriginal) artist and activist from Winnipeg, Manitoba.

== Biography ==
Traverse in an Anishinaabe, specifically Ojibwe, from Winnipeg, Manitoba. She spent her early years with her biological father living in Winnipeg, MB. Her father encouraged her early interest in art, buying her art supplies. Her early life was difficult growing up in Winnipeg's North End when her mother died at a young age and her siblings were apprehended in the Sixties Scoop. Traverse draws inspiration in her art and activism from her experience growing up as an indigenous woman in one of Winnipeg's toughest neighbourhoods. She studied at the School of Fine Arts at the University of Manitoba and graduated in 2009. Traverse is currently working out of Winnipeg, Manitoba.

== Artwork ==
Traverse is known for her acrylic/oil paintings and stop-motion animated films that feature indigenous women, the sacred feminine, motherhood, urban indigenous lifestyle and traditional native american spiritual themes, including the seven Grandfather teachings of the Anishinaabe. She has also created artwork for schools in Winnipeg to inspire and educate youth on indigenous culture and worldviews.

Traverse has displayed her paintings at The Wah-Sa Gallery and The Winnipeg Art Gallery in Winnipeg, Manitoba.

In 2009, Coca-Cola announced the Aboriginal Art Bottle Program as part of a mission to showcase indigenous art at the 2010 Winter Olympics in Vancouver. Out of hundreds of submissions from professional and amateur indigenous artists from across Canada, 15 sculptures were selected to be showcased across Canada and in Vancouver during the 2010 Winter Olympics. Jackie Traverse's submission was selected and displayed across Canada and in Vancouver during the Olympics. The 15 winning submissions were auctioned off with proceeds going to the Aboriginal Youth Legacy Fund.

On November 3, 2016, Traverse released a colouring book entitled Sacred Feminine: An Indigenous Art Colouring Book published by Fernwood Publishing.

She also creates murals, including the mural entitled Sweet Grass (Wiingash), painted in 2017 who was also included in the billboard project Resilience, curated by Lee-Ann Martin and produced by MAWA during Summer 2018.

=== Film ===
Traverse created three stop-motion animation films: Butterfly (2007), Two Scoops (2008) and Empty (2009).

Two Scoops tells the story of a traumatizing moment in her childhood when she witnessed Manitoba's Child and Family Services apprehend her siblings as part of the Sixties Scoop. The film was shown at the Winnipeg Aboriginal Film Festival in 2008 and in Toronto, Canada and Kathmandu, Nepal at the Imaginative Film Festival in 2009. Two Scoops was screened at the National Museum of the American Indian (George Gustav Heye Center) in New York City in 2008.

== Activism ==
Traverse is an Indigenous activist and supporter of the empowerment of indigenous women in Canada. The strength and power of women often depicted in her artwork and is reflected in her activism. She is the founder of a ride-share program in Winnipeg called Ikwe Safe Ride, designed to provide a safe alternative to taxi cabs after a string a reported sexual assaults on women in Winnipeg taxi cabs.

In 2015, Traverse was the founder of the Indigenous Rock the Vote movement in Winnipeg. The Indigenous Rock the Vote movement inspired indigenous people across Canada to challenge historical low voter turnout rates by voting in the 2015 Canadian Federal Election.
