= Mireille Levert =

Canadian writer and illustrator of children's books

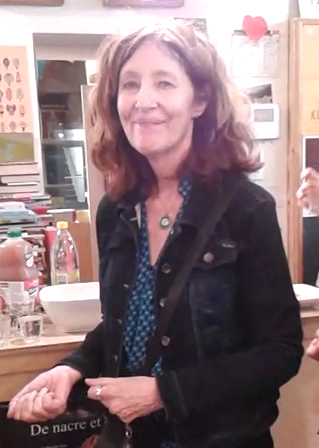
Image of Mirelle Levert

Mireille Levert (born December 20, 1956) is a Canadian writer and illustrator of children's books, living in Quebec.

Levert was born in Saint-Jean-sur-Richelieu and studied plastic arts at the Université du Québec à Montréal, graduating in 1979. She was a founding member of the Association des illustrateurs et illustratrices du Québec. Levert taught illustration at the Université du Québec à Montréal from 1997 to 2002. She lives and works in Montreal.

Levert took part in the International Biennial of Children's Books in Barcelona.

== Selected works ==
- La Giraffe, children's book, illustrated by Levert, text by Cécile Cloutier (1984)
- Passing time, children's book, illustrated by Levert, text by Christiane L'Heureux (1987)
- Jérémie et Mme Ming, children's book, illustrated by Levert, text by Sharon Jennings (1990) shortlisted for the Governor General's Award for French-language children's illustration
- Sleep Tight Mrs. Ming, children's book, illustrated by Levert, text by Sharon Jennings (1993) awarded the Governor General's Award for English-language children's illustration
- Little Red Riding Hood, children's book (1995)
- An Island in the Soup, children's book (2001) awarded the Governor General's Award for English-language children's illustration
- Émile Pantalon, children's book (2005) finalist for the Marilyn Baillie Picture Book Award
- The Princess Who Had Almost Everything, children's book (2006)
- Quand j'écris avec mon cœur, children's poetry (2014), shortlisted for the Governor General's Award for French-language children's illustration
- Un jour je bercerai la terre, children's poetry (2017)
