= Melanie Florence =

Canadian author

- Occupation: Author
- Writing career
- Notable awards: American Indian Youth Literature Awards (2012); TD Canadian Children's Literature Award (2016)
- Website: melanieflorence.com

Melanie Florence is a Canadian author of Cree and Scottish heritage.

Florence lives in Toronto, Ontario, but several of her books are informed by the experiences of her grandfather, who attended one of Canada's infamous residential schools. She writes both fiction and non-fiction for children and young adult audiences. Her books are about historical and contemporary issues affecting indigenous people.

In 2016, Florence was awarded the TD Canadian Children's Literature Award for her picture book, Missing Nimâmâ. The book tells the story of a young, indigenous mother, a missing woman, watching from afar as her daughter grows up. The prize is one of the largest in Canadian children's literature.

== Works ==
- Jordin Tootoo: The Highs and Lows in the Journey of the First Inuit to Play in the NHL (Lorimer, 2011, ISBN 9781552775295)
- Righting Canada's Wrongs: Residential Schools (Lorimer, 2015, ISBN 1459408667)
- Missing Nimâmâ (illustrated by Francois Thisdale, Clockwise, 2015, ISBN 0993935141)
- One Night (Lorimer, 2016, ISBN 9781459409842)
- The Missing (Lorimer, 2016, ISBN 9781459410886)
- Rez Runaway (Lorimer, 2016, ISBN 9781459411630)
- He Who Dreams (Orca, 2017, ISBN 9781459811041)
- Stolen Words (illustrated by Gabrielle Grimard, Second Story, 2017, ISBN 9781772600377)
- The One About the Blackbird (illustrated by Matt James, Tundra Books, 2025, ISBN 9781774882665)
- Sarabeth's Garage (illustrated by Nadia Alam, Tundra Books, 2026, ISBN 9781774885956)

== Awards ==
- 2012: American Indian Youth Literature Award (for Jordin Tootoo)
- 2015: Second Story Press's Aboriginal Writing Contest (for Stolen Words)
- 2016: TD Canadian Children's Literature Award (for Missing Nimâmâ)
- 2017: Forest of Reading Golden Oak Award (for Missing Nimâmâ)
- 2018: Ruth and Sylvia Schwartz Children’s Book Award (for Stolen Words)
