= Canadian Children's Book Centre =

Canadian educational non-profit

Canadian Children's Book Centre (CCBC) is a national non-profit organization that dedicates its resources to promoting quality Canadian children's literature to parents, librarians, teachers, and youth across Canada. Founded in 1976, the CCBC has library collections in five cities across Canada (Toronto, Hamilton, Vancouver, Edmonton, Winnipeg, and Halifax) with its national office located in Toronto.

== Programs ==
=== Canadian Children's Book Week ===
Founded in 1977, Canadian Children's Book Week is the largest celebration of Canadian books for young people in Canada. Each spring, authors, illustrators, and storytellers visit communities throughout the country—both in person and virtually—to participate in readings and workshops with Canadian youth. Book week reaches over 28,000 children and teens in schools and libraries across Canada every year.

=== TD Grade One Book Giveaway Program ===
Founded in 2000, in cooperation with ministries of education, school boards, and library organizations across Canada, the TD Grade One Book Giveaway Program was created in order to provide every Grade One student across Canada with the gift of a free book in either English or French. Annually, 500,000 free books are distributed to children across the country.

=== Canadian National Children's Book Awards ===
The Canadian Children's Book Centre, with the help of its sponsors, honours the great achievements of Canadian authors and illustrators through its book awards:

- TD Canadian Children's Literature Award ($50,000)
- Prix TD de littérature canadienne pour l'enfance et la jeunesse ($50,000)
- Marilyn Baillie Picture Book Award ($20,000)
- Geoffrey Bilson Award for Historical Fiction for Young People ($5,000)
- Amy Mathers Teen Book Award ($5,000)
- Jean Little First-Novel Award ($5,000)
- David Booth Children's and Youth Poetry Award ($3,500, biennially)
- Sharon Fitzhenry Award for Canadian Children's Non-Fiction (CA$10,000)

The Canadian Children's Book Centre previously awarded the Arlene Barlin Award for Science Fiction and Fantasy ($5,000), Norma Fleck Award for Canadian Children's Non-Fiction ($10,000), the John Spray Mystery Award ($5,000), the Monica Hughes Award for Science Fiction and Fantasy ($5,000), and the Prix Harry Black de l'album jeunesse ($5,000).

In 2024 it took over administration of the Richard Allen Chase Memorial Award, a prize previously presented by the Rocky Mountain Book Award to honor books with themes of compassion and kindness.

== Publications ==
=== Canadian Children's Book News ===
A triannual magazine, Canadian Children's Book News, reviews books, interviews authors and illustrators, includes annotated reading lists, informs and updates readers about issues affecting children's education and reading, and provides information and news about the world of children's books in Canada.

=== Best Books for Kids and Teens ===
Directed at teachers, librarians, parents, and writers, Best Books for Kids & Teens is a semi-annual publication that acts as a guide to the best Canadian children's books, magazines, audio, and video. Each of the selections is handpicked by expert committees of teachers, educators, and librarians across the country.

=== Get Published: The Writing for Children Kit ===
A kit for new writers with information on how to submit manuscripts and portfolios, copyright procedures, and a list of current Canadian publishers who accept unsolicited manuscripts.
