= The Boy Sherlock Holmes =

Novel series by Shane Peacock

- First edition cover of The Eye of the Crow, the first book in the series
- Author: Shane Peacock
- Language: English
- No. of books: 6

The Boy Sherlock Holmes series of novels, by Shane Peacock, are the childhood exploits of the famous fictional detective Sherlock Holmes. All are published by Tundra Books simultaneously in Canada and the U.S. (and appear in other countries and languages, including China, France, Vietnam, Indonesia, and Spain).

== Books in the series ==
- Eye of the Crow (2007)
- Death in the Air (2008)
- Vanishing Girl (2010)
- Secret Fiend (2010)
- Dragon Turn (2011)
- Becoming Holmes (2012)

== Reception ==
Eye of the Crow was selected as a Booklist "Top Ten in Young Mysteries" and was a winner of the Arthur Ellis Award for Juvenile Crime Fiction.

School Library Journal called the series "spellbinding" and stated that "Younger YAs will be captivated by Shane Peacock’s The Boy Sherlock Holmes, a series of novels".

All have won Junior Library Guild of America Premier Selection Awards. The series as a whole has garnered more than 40 awards, nominations, and honors.

== Adaptation ==
In November 2022, it was announced that The Boy Sherlock Holmes series would be adapted as a co-production between Productivity Media and Wind Sun Sky Entertainment with Matt Cirulnick writing.

== See also ==
- The Enola Holmes Mysteries
- Young Sherlock Holmes (books)
- Young Sherlock Holmes
