= Andrée Poulin =

Canadian writer (born 1960)

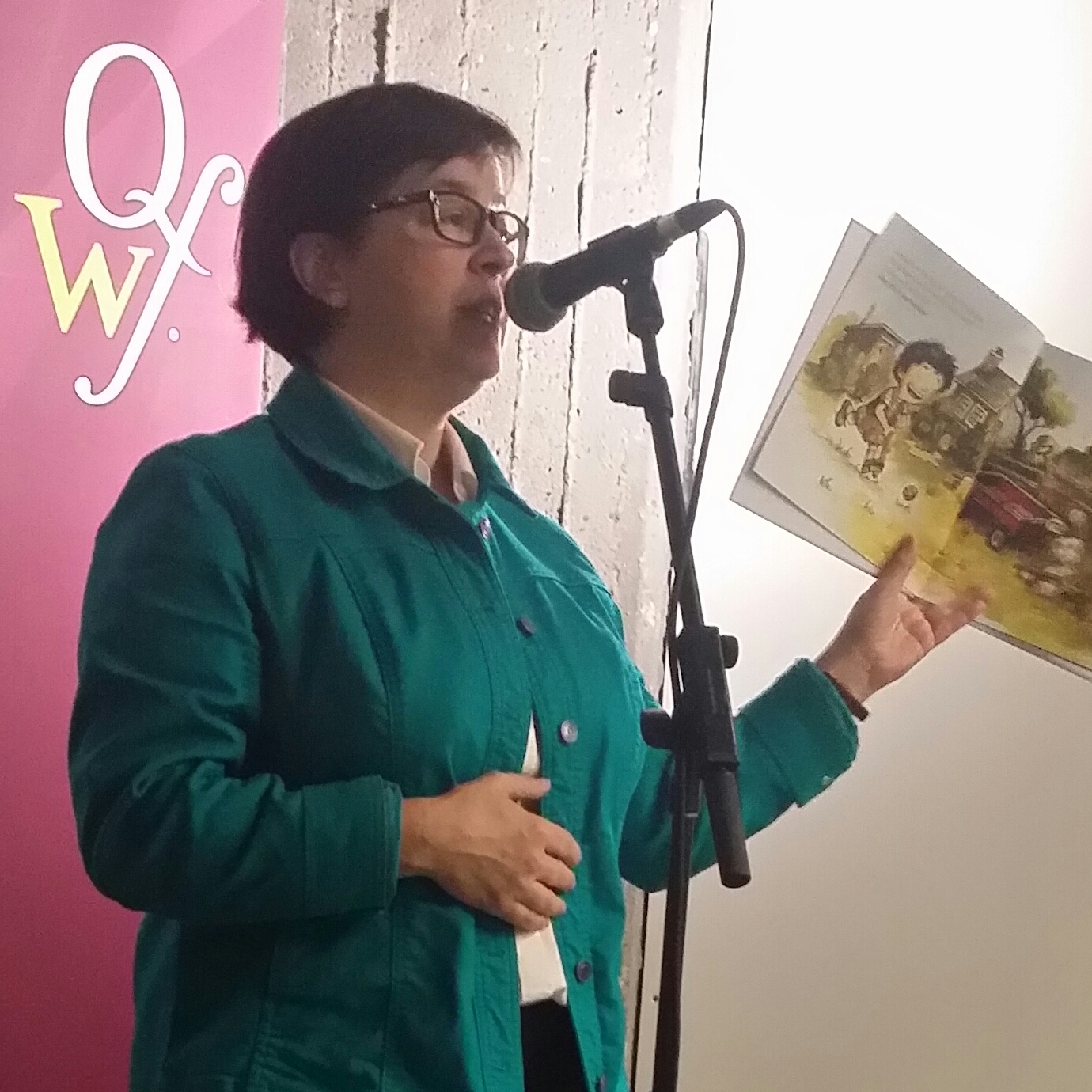
- Poulin in Montréal, Québec, Canada at the Salon du livre de Montréal 2018.
- Born: July 29, 1960 (age 66); Orleans, Ontario
- Writing career
- Notable awards: TD Canadian Children's Literature Award (2014)

Andrée Poulin (born July 29, 1960) is a Canadian writer. She was born in Orleans, Ontario, now part of Ottawa. She worked as a journalist before becoming a full-time writer. Poulin now lives in Gatineau, Quebec

She has been awarded the literary prize offered by Le Droit in the youth literature category four times. Her books were finalists for Hackmatack Book Awards in 2005, 2006 and 2011.

== Selected work ==
- Ping contre Tête-de-Navet (2003)
- Le meilleur moment (2007) illustrated by Philippe Beha
- Où sont passés les zippopos? (2009)
- Mon papa ne pue pas (2009) illustrated by Jean Morin, received the Prize awarded by the customers of the Réseau des bibliothèques de la Ville de Québec
- Miss Pissenlit (2010), received the Prix du livre jeunesse des bibliothèques de Montréal
- À la découverte de l'Ontario français : abécédaire (2012)
- La plus grosse poutine du monde (2013), received the TD Canadian Children's Literature Award and the Prix Tamarac
- Pablo trouve un trésor (2014)
- Un bain trop plein (2014)
- Disparition sous le baobab (2015)
- Deux garçons et un secret (2016) illustrated by Marie Lafrance, was a finalist for the Governor General's Award for French-language children's illustration
- Une cachette pour les bobettes (2016), was a finalist for the Prix du livre jeunesse des bibliothèques de Montréal
- L'album jeunesse, un trésor à exploiter: concepts clés et activités pour maximiser le potentiel pédagogique des albums (2017)
- Y'a pas de place chez nous illustrated by Enzo Lord Mariano (2016)
