= Isabelle Malenfant (illustrator) =

Isabelle Malenfant is a Canadian illustrator of children's books. She is most noted for her work on Andrée Poulin's book Pablo Finds a Treasure (Pablo trouve un trésor), for which she was a nominated finalist for the Governor General's Award for French-language children's illustration at the 2014 Governor General's Awards.
