= Angèle Delaunois =

Canadian author (born 1946)

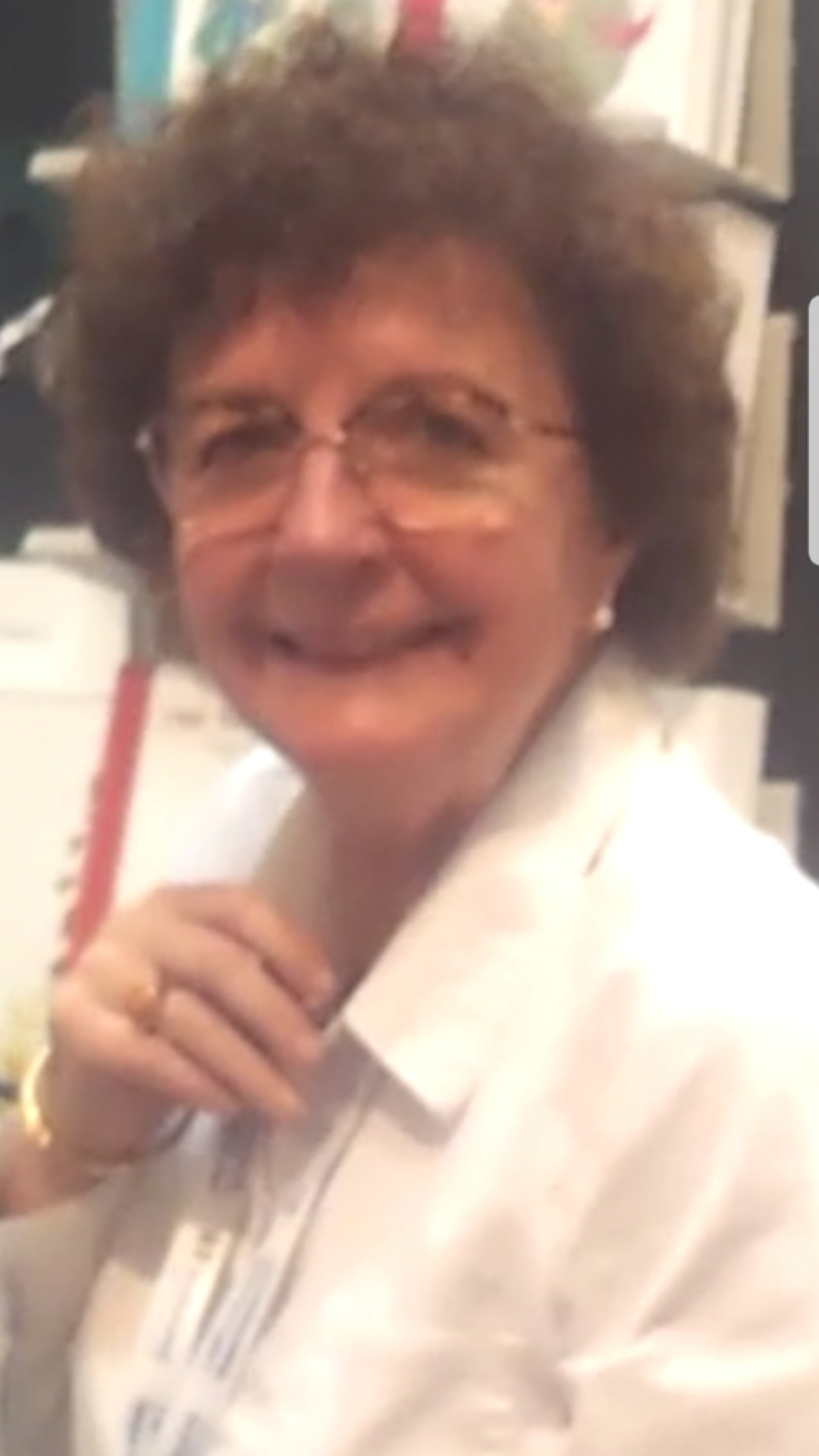

Angèle Delaunois (born November 17, 1946) is a Canadian author born in France and living in Quebec.

She was born in Granville and came to Quebec in 1968, becoming a Canadian citizen in 1976. She earned a BA in plastic arts from the Université du Québec à Trois-Rivières and was a lecturer there for ten years. Delaunois moved to Montreal in 1982, where she worked for the Quebec consumer magazine Protégez-vous. In 1989, she decided to devote herself to writing full-time. Delaunois worked for the publishing house Les Éditions Héritage for ten years as director for several of their collections. In 1998, she became literary director for youth collections at Éditions Pierre Tisseyre. In 2004, Delaunois founded her own publishing company Éditions de l'isatis.

== Selected works ==
- Les oiseaux de chez nous (1990), received the Prix d'excellence from the Association des Consommateurs du Québec
- Les Mammifères de chez nous (1993), received the Prix d'excellence from the Association des professeurs de sciences du Québec
- Variations sur un même «t'aime» (1997), received the Governor General's Award for French-language children's literature
- Les Bisous (2001)
- Maïa et l'oiseau (2002), received the Prix Hackmatack
- Le pays sans musique (2005)
- Les Enfants de l'eau (2006)
- Le Mur (2007)
- La Demoiselle oubliée (2008)
- La Clé (2008), illustrations by Christine Delezenne, received the Elizabeth Mrazik-Cleaver Canadian Picture Book Award
