= Isabelle Arsenault =

Canadian illustrator (born 1978)

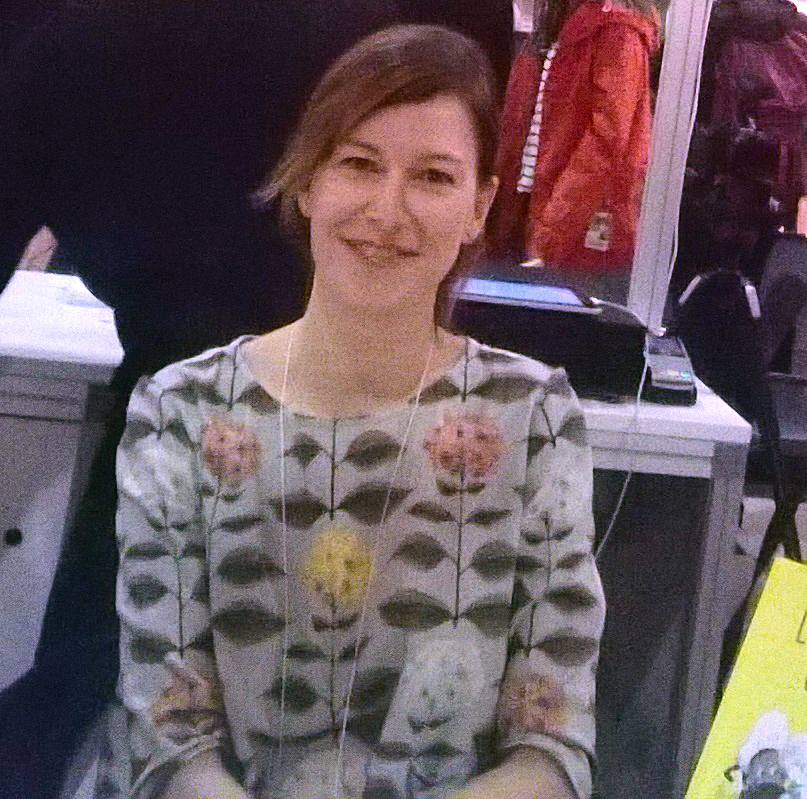
Isabelle Arseanault photographed in Montréal, Québec, Canada at the Salon du livre de Montréal 2017.

Isabelle Arsenault (born 1978) is a Canadian award winning illustrator living in Montreal, Quebec. She is known for her elaborate yet simplified artwork in children's literature.

== Early life and education ==
Born in Sept-Îles, Quebec, Arsenault and her family moved to Île-Bizard and lived there much of her adolescent life. As a child Arsenault took part in a contest for illustration, that her local newspaper was holding at the time for Christmas. It was at this stage in her life that she had realized her passion for artistic endeavors, and this was made more apparent by her winning the contest. She notes "I understood that I really enjoyed drawing, and I could use my ability to create something unique".

Arsenault spent many of her childhood years never going to art schools, as she was not aware that art was to become her future profession. However, she did take various arts studies within her Secondary school education. It was through her various art classes that teachers inspired her. She claims she would spend hours at a time on art through various mediums outside of her classroom.

== Career ==
In 2005, she won the Governor General's Award for French-language children's illustration for Le Coeur de Monsieur Gauguin; the text was by Marie-Danielle Croteau. She won the same award in 2013 for her illustration of the graphic novel Jane, le renard et moi with text by Fanny Britt; this book also won the Joe Shuster Award for outstanding artist, the Prix Bédélys and the Prix Réal-Fillion and the English translation Jane, the fox and me was named to the New York Times list of the ten best illustrated books for children for 2013. Migrant, illustrated by Arsenault, was named to the New York Times' list for 2011. In 2012, she won the Governor General's Award for English-language children's illustration for Virginia Wolf; Kyo Maclear provided the text. In 2019, she was a finalist for the Governor General's Award for English-language Young People's Literature - Illustrated Books for Albert's Quiet Quest. Additionally, in 2020 IBBY Canada nominated Isabelle Arsenault with the Hans Christian Andersen Award. Her accomplishments towards the ongoing expansion of children's literature were noteworthy enough to consider her for nomination.

== Approach to illustrations ==
=== Visual style ===
Arsenault's art style is often described as minimalist in nature, and for the most part very colorful. Instead of opting for hard lines and detailed backgrounds and characters, she often illustrates with an ease of hand, but conveys emotion through these simple images and their text. Much of Arsenault's art attempts to evoke emotions in the reader, with more interest in showcasing the character's state of mind, and less the external causes for their state of mind. In her seminal work for Maxine Trottier's Migrant we see this at work, as much of the environment is less focused upon; when in contrast the young Mennonite farmer's child envisions herself and others visually as jackrabbits and kittens.

=== Planning ===
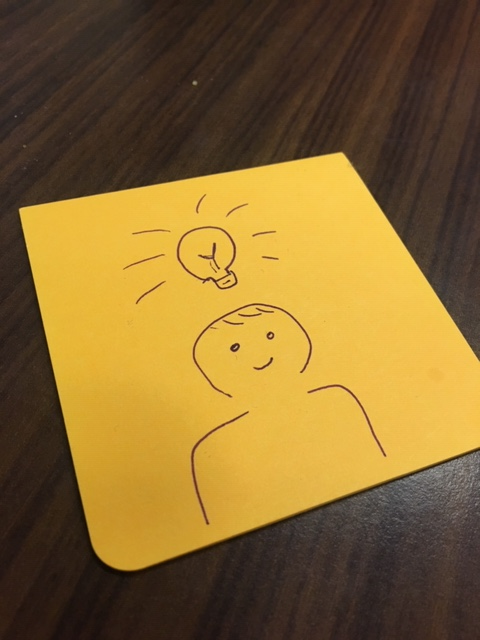
example

Arsenault attributes her style to doodling early drafts as rough as possible, so to understand the overall visual story she wishes to produce. Arsenault explains in her blog that it grants her a level of freedom that allows for her emotions at the time of finalization to be expressed through her art. Much of her style is derived from her experimental improvisational approach, filled with potential mistakes.

== Publication ==
Year	Title	Illustrator	ISBN	Publisher
2008	My letter to the World	Isabelle Arsenault	ISBN 978-1554533398	Kids Can Press
2010	Spork	Isabelle Arsenault	ISBN 978-1553377368	Kids Can Press
2011	Virginia Wolf Migrant	Isabelle Arsenault	ISBN 978-1554536498 ISBN 9780888999757	Kids Can Press Groundwood Books
2012	Once upon a northern night Jane, le renard & moi	Isabelle Arsenault	ISBN 978-1554981380 ISBN 978-2923841328	Groundwood Books PASTEQUE
2014	Alpha	Isabelle Arsenault	ISBN 9782923841618	PASTEQUE
2016	Louis Parmi Les Spectres You Belong Here Cloth Lullaby, The woven life of Louise Bourgeois	Isabelle Arsenault	ISBN 978-2-89777-000-6 ISBN 1938298993 ISBN 978-1419718816	PASTEQUE Compendium Inc Harry N. Abrams
2017	Colette's Lost Pet	Isabelle Arsenault	ISBN 9781101917596	Tundra Books
2018	Captain Rosalie The Honey Bee	Isabelle Arsenault	ISBN 9781536205206 ISBN 9781481469975	Candlewick Atheneum Books for Young Readers
2019	Just Because Albert's Quiet Quest	Isabelle Arsenault	ISBN 0763696803 ISBN 9781101917626	Candlewick Tundra Books
2021	Maya's Big Scene	Isabelle Arsenault	ISBN 9780735267602	Tundra Books
