= The Fan Brothers =

Children's book illustrators

Terry Fan and Eric Fan are American-born Canadian children's book writers and illustrators, known collectively as the Fan Brothers. They made their picture book debut with The Night Gardener (2016), which was named an ALA Notable Children's Book.

== Biography ==
The siblings were both born in the United States (Terry in Illinois and Eric in Hawaii), and grew up in Toronto, Canada. They both studied at OCAD University.

Known professionally as the Fan Brothers, they made their picture book debut in 2016 with The Night Gardener, which they wrote and illustrated. The book earned positive reviews in Kirkus, Publishers Weekly, Quill & Quire, and BookPage. The Night Gardener was named an ALA Notable Children's Book and was a finalist for the Cybils Award for children's literature.

In 2018, the Fan Brothers published Ocean Meets Sky. A review in Quill & Quire called the book's illustrations "truly breathtaking". The book was shortlisted for the CILIP Kate Greenaway Medal for children's book illustration and for the Governor General's Award for English-language children's illustration.

The Fan Brothers collaborated with their youngest brother, Devin Fan, on his book debut, The Barnabus Project (2020). The book, released in September 2020, has earned positive reviews in the Canadian Review of Materials and Kirkus. The book won the Governor General's Award for English-language Young People's Literature - Illustrated Books at the 2020 Governor General's Awards.

== Selected works ==
=== As authors and illustrators ===
- The Night Gardener (2016) ISBN 9781786030412
- Ocean Meets Sky (2018) ISBN 9781786035622
- The Barnabus Project (2020), with Devin Fan ISBN 9780735263260
- It Fell From the Sky (2021) ISBN 9781534457621
- Barnaby Unboxed! (2024), with Devin Fan ISBN 9781774882436

=== As illustrators ===
- The Darkest Dark (2016), by Chris Hadfield ISBN 9781529013610
- The Antlered Ship (2018), by Dashka Slater ISBN 9781786031068
- The Scarecrow (2019), by Beth Ferry ISBN 9780062475763
