= Danielle Simard =

Canadian writer and illustrator (born 1952)

- Born: March 12, 1952 (age 74); Montreal, Quebec, Canada
- Education: Université du Québec à Montréal
- Occupations: Writer; illustrator
- Writing career
- Genre: Children's literature

Danielle Simard (born March 12, 1952) is a Canadian writer and illustrator living in Quebec.

She was born in Montreal and studied design at the Université du Québec à Montréal. Simard worked as a graphic artist for various organizations, including Radio-Canada and a Laval school board. In 1989, she decided to dedicate herself to writing and illustrating children's books. Since 1992, she has concentrated more on writing. Simard was literary and artistic director for the Maboul collection of Quebec publishing house Éditions du Boréal.

== Selected works ==
- C'est pas tous les jours Noël, juvenile fiction (1994), finalist for the Prix 12/17 Brive-Montréal
- J'ai vendu ma sœu (2002), received the Governor General's Award for French-language children's literature
- Les petites folies du jeudi (2003)
- La plus méchante maman (2005)
- L'Esprit du vent, juvenile fiction (2005)
