= Monique Gray Smith =

Canadian writer

- Born: 1968 (age 57–58)
- Occupation: Writer
- Writing career
- Genres: Children's literature, young adult fiction
- Notable works: Tilly, a Story of Hope and Resilience
- Notable awards: Burt Award for First Nations, Métis and Inuit Literature

Monique Gray Smith is a Canadian writer of children's and young adult literature. She is also an international speaker and consultant. Of Cree, Lakota and Scottish descent, Smith is based in Victoria, British Columbia.

== Career ==
She is most noted for her young adult novel Tilly, a Story of Hope and Resilience, which won the Burt Award for First Nations, Métis and Inuit Literature in 2014, and her children's picture book My Heart Fills With Happiness, which won the Christie Harris Illustrated Children's Literature Prize in 2017. In 2018 she was named as a finalist for the TD Canadian Children's Literature Award for Speaking Our Truth: A Journey of Reconciliation, and for the Burt Award for The Journey Forward, a compilation of two novellas co-written with Richard Van Camp. In the same year she published Tilly and the Crazy Eights, a sequel to her first novel.

In addition to her work as a writer, Smith has worked as a psychiatric nurse in Indigenous communities for over 25 years, having completed formal nurses training at Douglas College. She also spent 5 years working as Instructor for Curriculum Design at the Justice Institute of BC and has been an Inspirational Speaker for Little Drum Consulting for more than 20 years.

== Awards ==
- Winner of Burt Award for First Nations, Métis and Inuit Literature for Tilly: A Story of Hope and Resilience, 2014.
- Winner of Bolen Books Children's Book Prize for Speaking Our Truth: A Journey of Reconciliation, 2018.
- Finalist for BC Book Prize for My Heart Fills With Happiness, 2017.
- Finalist for the Marilyn Baillie Picture Book Award for You Hold Me Up.
- Finalist for TD Canadian Children's Literature Award for Speaking Our Truth: A Journey of Reconciliation, 2018.
