= Christie Harris Illustrated Children's Literature Prize =

Canadian literary award

The Christie Harris Illustrated Children's Literature Prize is awarded annually as the BC Book Prize for Canadian authors and illustrator of picture books, picture story books, and illustrated non-fiction books. The prize is shared by the author and the illustrator, who must be a resident of British Columbia or Yukon. It was announced in 2002 and first awarded in 2003. A handful of finalists (roughly 25%) are also selected for another award: participation in the expenses-paid BC Book Prizes on Tour, a week-long tour across the province to present their books at schools and libraries each April.

== History ==
The prize was announced three months after the death of Christie Harris, and was the first new BC Book Prize category since the Sheila A. Egoff Children's Literature Prize was introduced in 1987.

== Winners and finalists ==
Year	Author(s)	Illustrator(s)	Title	Result	Ref.
2003	Annette LeBox	Karen Reczuch	Salmon Creek	Winner	
2003	Maggie De Vries	Sheena Lott	How Sleep Found Tabitha	Finalist	
2003	Nan Gregory	Kady MacDonald Denton	Amber Waiting	Finalist	
2003	Julie Lawson	Paul Mombourquette	The Klondike Cat	Finalist	
2003	Andrea Spalding	Janet Wilson	Solomon's Tree	Finalist	
2004	Linda Bailey	Bill Slavin	Stanley's Party	Winner	
2004	Linda Bailey	Bill Slavin	Adventures in Ancient China	Finalist	
2004	Julie Lawson	Kasia Charko	Arizona Charlie and the Klondike Kid	Finalist	
2004	Robin Mitchell and Judith Steedman	Robin Mitchell	Sunny	Finalist	
2004	Chieri Uegaki	Stéphane Jorisch	Suki's Kimono	Finalist	
2005	Marilynn Reynolds	Renné Benoit	Goodbye to Griffith Street	Winner	
2005	Stefan Czernecki	Stefan Czernecki	Ride 'em Cowboy	Finalist	
2005	Earl Einarson	Julie Flett	The Moccasins	Finalist	
2005	Adrienne Mason	Nancy Gray Ogle	Owls	Finalist	
2005	Richard Thompson and Maggee Spicer	Kirsti Anne Wakelin	When They Are Up	Finalist	
2006	Tanya Lloyd Kyi		The Blue Jean Book: The Story Behind the Seams	Winner	
2006	Carol Foskett Cordsen	Douglas B. Jones	The Milkman	Finalist	
2006	Elisa Gutiérrez	Elisa Gutiérrez	Picturescape	Finalist	
2006	Diane Silvey	John Manth	The Kids Book of Aboriginal Peoples in Canada	Finalist	
2006	Paul Yee	Shaoli Wang	Bamboo	Finalist	
2007	Maggie De Vries	Renné Benoit	Tale of a Great White Fish: A Sturgeon Story	Winner	
2007	Sarah Ellis	Dušan Petričić	The Queen's Feet	Finalist	
2007	Deborah Hodge	John Mantha	The Kids Book of Canadian Immigration	Finalist	
2007	Catherine Jameson	Julie Flett	Zoe and the Fawn	Finalist	
2007	Ellen Schwartz	Sima Elizabeth Shefrin	Abby's Birds	Finalist	
2008	Robert Heidbreder	Kady MacDonald Denton	A Sea-Wishing Day	Winner	
2008	Lisa Cinar	Lisa Cinar	The Day It All Blew Away	Finalist	
2008	Nan Gregory	Luc Melanson	Pink	Finalist	
2008	Ron Smith	Ruth Campbell	Elf the Eagle	Finalist	
2008	Kari-Lynn Winters	Ben Hodson	Jeffrey and Sloth	Finalist	
2009	Katarina Jovanovic	Philippe Beha	The King Has Goat Ears	Winner	
2009	Linda Bailey	Bill Slavin	Stanley At Sea	Finalist	
2009	Robert Bateman	Robert Bateman	Polar Worlds: Life at the Ends of the Earth	Finalist	
2009	Chieri Uegaki	Stéphane Jorisch	Rosie and Buttercup	Finalist	
2009	Irene N. Watts	Kathryn E. Shoemaker	Good-bye Marianne	Finalist	
2010	Frieda Wishinsky	Dean Griffiths	Maggie Can't Wait	Winner	
2010	Robert Bateman	Robert Bateman	Vanishing Habitats	Finalist	
2010	Fiona Bayrock	Carolyn Conahan	Bubble Homes and Fish Farts	Finalist	
2010	Jennifer Lloyd	Ashley Spires	Ella's Umbrellas	Finalist	
2010	Kari-Lynn Winters	Christina Leist	On My Walk	Finalist	
2011	Julie Flett	Julie Flett	Owls See Clearly at Night: A Michif Alphabet	Winner	
2011	Maggie De Vries	Renné Benoit	Fraser Bear: A Cub's Life	Finalist	
2011	Seiji Hiroe	Seiji Hiroe	The Cowboy Fisherman	Finalist	
2011	Deborah Hodge	Brian Harris	Up We Grow! A Year in the Life of a Small, Local Farm	Finalist	
2011	Ian McAllister and Nicholas Read	Ian McAllister	The Salmon Bears: Giants of the Great Bear Rainforest	Finalist	
2012	Sara O'Leary	Julie Morstad	When I Was Small	Winner	
2012	Dan Bar-el	Rae Maté	Pussycat, Pussycat, Where Have You Been?	Finalist	
2012	Nicola I. Campbell	Kim LaFave	Grandpa's Girls	Finalist	
2012	Mike Deas	Mike Deas	Dalen & Gole: Scandal in Port Angus	Finalist	
2012	Robert Heidbreder	Marc Mongeau	Shake Awakes	Finalist	
2013	Alan Woo	Isabelle Malenfant	Maggie's Chopsticks	Winner	
2013	Vivien Bowers	Milan Pavlovic	Hey Canada!	Finalist	
2013	Tiffany Stone	Stefan Czernecki	Rainbow Shoes	Finalist	
2013	Kari-Lynn Winters	Stephen Taylor	Gift Days	Finalist	
2013	Frieda Wishinsky	Sean L. Moore	What's Up, Bear?: A Book About Opposites	Finalist	
2014	Julie Morstad	Julie Morstad	How To	Winner	
2014	Dan Bar-el	Tim Bowers	Not Your Typical Dragon	Finalist	
2014	Julie Flett	Julie Flett	Wild Berries	Finalist	
2014	Christy Jordan-Fenton and Margaret Pokiak-Fenton	Gabrielle Grimard	When I Was Eight	Finalist	
2014	Ian McAllister and Nicholas Read	Ian McAllister	The Great Bear Sea: Exploring the Marine Life of a Pacific Paradise	Finalist	
2015	Roy Miki and Slavia Miki	Julie Flett	Dolphin SOS	Winner	
2015	Caroline Adderson	Qin Leng	Norman, Speak!	Finalist	
2015	Ashley Spires	Ashley Spires	The Most Magnificent Thing	Finalist	
2015	Heather Tekavec	Pierre Pratt	Stop, Thief!	Finalist	
2015	Chieri Uegaki	Qin Leng	Hana Hashimoto, Sixth Violin	Finalist	
2016	Annette LeBox	Stephanie Graegin	Peace Is an Offering	Winner	
2016	Robert Heidbreder	Qin Leng	Song for a Summer Night: A Lullaby	Finalist	
2016	Jude Isabella	Simone Shin	The Red Bicycle: The Extraordinary Story of One Ordinary Bicycle	Finalist	
2016	Sara O'Leary	Julie Morstad	This is Sadie	Finalist	
2016	Roy Henry Vickers and Robert Budd	Roy Henry Vickers	Orca Chief	Finalist	
2017	Monique Gray Smith	Julie Flett	My Heart Fills with Happiness	Winner	
2017	Julie Morstad	Julie Morstad	Today	Finalist	
2017	Margriet Ruurs	Nizar Ali Badr	Stepping Stones: A Refugee Family's Journey	Finalist	
2017	Nikki Tate	Nikki Tate	Deep Roots: How Trees Sustain Our Planet	Finalist	
2017	Roy Henry Vickers and Robert Budd	Roy Henry Vickers	Peace Dancer	Finalist	
2018	Faith Erin Hicks	Faith Erin Hicks	The Nameless City: The Stone Heart	Winner	
2018	Nicola I. Campbell	Julie Flett	A Day with Yayah	Finalist	
2018	S.E. Hume	Jessica Bromley Bartram	Charles	Finalist	
2018	Ian McAllister and Nicholas Read	Ian McAllister	Wolf Island	Finalist	
2018	Bill Richardson	Roxanna Bikadoroff	The Alphabet Thief	Finalist	
2019	Ian Boothby	Nina Matsumoto	Sparks!	Winner	
2019	Cale Atkinson	Cale Atkinson	Sir Simon: Super Scarer	Finalist	
2019	Aidan Cassie	Aidan Cassie	Sterling, Best Dog Ever	Finalist	
2019	Faith Erin Hicks	Faith Erin Hicks	The Nameless City: The Divided Earth	Finalist	
2019	Margriet Ruurs	Robert Bateman	Robert Bateman: The Boy Who Painted Nature	Finalist	
2020	Kyo Maclear	Julie Morstad	It Began With a Page: How Gyo Fujikawa Drew the Way	Winner	
2020	Jen Croll	Aneta Pacholska	Bad Boys of Fashion: Style Rebels and Renegades Through the Ages	Finalist	
2020	Julie Flett	Julie Flett	Birdsong	Finalist	
2020	Heather Smith	Rachel Wada	The Phone Booth in Mr. Hirota’s Garden	Finalist	
2020	Nancy Vo	Nancy Vo	The Ranger	Finalist	
2021	Rina Singh	Ellen Rooney	Grandmother School	Winner	
2021	Linda Bailey	Joy Ang	Princesses Versus Dinosaurs	Finalist	
2021	Bonnie Sherr Klein	Élisabeth Eudes-Pascal	Beep Beep Bubbie	Finalist	
2021	Danny Ramadan	Anna Bron	Salma the Syrian Chef	Finalist	
2021	Jordan Scott	Sydney Smith	I Talk Like a River	Finalist	
2022	Julie Morstad	Julie Morstad	Time is a Flower	Winner	
2022	Whitney Gardner	Whitney Gardner	Long Distance	Finalist	
2022	Kallie George	Elly McKay	The Secret Fawn	Finalist	
2022	Shane Goth	Yong Ling Kang	The Midnight Club	Finalist	
2022	David A. Robertson	Julie Flett	On the Trapline	Finalist	
2023	Jessika Von Innerebner	Jessika Von Innerebner	That's My Sweater!	Winner	
2023	Linda Bailey	Isabelle Follath	Arthur Who Wrote Sherlock	Finalist	
2023	Nathan Fairbairn	Michele Assarasakorn	PAWS: Mindy Makes Some Space	Finalist	
2023	Guojing	Guojing	The Flamingo	Finalist	
2023	Buffy Sainte-Marie	Julie Flett	Still This Love Goes On	Finalist	
2024	Jordan Scott	Sydney Smith	My Baba’s Garden	Winner	
2024	E. G. Alaraj	Martyna Czub	When Stars Arise	Shortlist	
2024	Lorna Schultz Nicholson	Ellen Rooney	What to Bring	Shortlist	
2024	Kirsten Pendreigh	Crystal Smith	Maybe a Whale	Shortlist	
2024	David A. Robertson	Maya McKibben	The Song That Called Them Home	Shortlist	
2025	Julie Morstad	Julie Morstad	A Face Is a Poem	Winner	
2025	Jessica J. Lee	Elaine Chen	A Garden Called Home	Shortlist	
2025	Tonya Simpson	Delreé Dumont	This Land Is a Lullaby	Shortlist	
2025	Julie Wilkins	Brady Sato	We're Happy You're Here	Shortlist	
2025	Mei Yu	Mei Yu	Lost & Found	Shortlist	
2026	Samantha Beynon	Carla Joseph	Celebrating Potlatches	Winner	
2026	Katrina Chen, Elaine Su	Delphie Côté-Lacroix	A Stronger Home	Shortlist	
2026	GuoJing	GuoJing	Oasis	Shortlist	
2026	Deborah Kerbel	Udayana Lugo	No Huddles for Heloise	Shortlist	
2026	David A. Robertson	Maya McKibbin	Little Shoes	Shortlist	
