= Nicola I. Campbell =

Nłeʔkepmx, Syilx, and Métis author and educator

- Awards: TD Canadian Children's Literature Award (2009)

Academic background
- Education: University of British Columbia (MFA, Ph.D.)
- Academic advisors: Keith Maillard (MFA); Allison Hargreaves, Jeannette Armstrong and Greg Younging (Ph.D.)

Nicola I. Campbell is a Nłeʔkepmx, Syilx, and Métis poet, author, and educator who lives in British Columbia. Her picture book Shin-chi's Canoe won the 2009 TD Canadian Children's Literature Award.

== Personal life ==
Campbell grew up on the traditional territory of the Nłeʔkepmx and Syilx people in the Nicola Valley of British Columbia. Her mother is of Interior Salish and Nsilx ancestry, and her father is Métis; many of her family members attended residential schools. Her paternal aunt is Indigenous Canadian author Maria Campbell, whose work inspired Campbell's interest in Indigenous traditions, history, and writing.

== Career ==
=== Academia ===
Campbell received a Master of Fine Arts from the University of British Columbia (UBC). Her memoir, Spíləx̣m, was completed for her master's thesis under the advisory of Keith Maillard. Later, she completed a Doctor of Philosophy from UBC with Jeannette Armstrong and Greg Younging on her advisory committee.

Campbell is an assistant professor in the Indigenous Studies program at the University of the Fraser Valley.

=== Writing ===
Campbell's first book, Shi-shi-etko, illustrated by Kim LaFave, was published by Groundwood Books in 2005. The book went on to be a finalist for the TD Canadian Children's Literature Award, Marilyn Baillie Picture Book Award, and Ruth Schwartz Award. In 2018, CBC Books included Shi-shi-etko on their list of "14 inspiring children's books from Indigenous writers."

Her second book, Shin-chi's Canoe, also illustrated by Kim LaFave, and published by Groundwood Books, was published in 2008. It won the 2009 TD Canadian Children's Literature Award and was a finalist for the year's Marilyn Baillie Picture Book Award.

Grandpa's Girls, also illustrated by Kim LaFave and published by Groundwood Books was published in 2011. The book was a finalist for the Christie Harris Illustrated Children's Literature Prize.

A Day with Yayah, illustrated by Julie Flett, was published by Tradewind Books in 2017. In an interview with CBC Books, Campbell explained that she didn't want tragedy to be the only story told by and about Indigenous people. Instead, she wanted to write a book that helped Indigenous people feel "empowered."

Campbell published Stand Like a Cedar, illustrated by Carrielynn Victor, with HighWater Press in 2021.

In 2021, Campbell published her memoir, Spíləx̣m: A Weaving of Recovery, Resilience, and Resurgence, which was first written to fulfill the requirements of her thesis project for her Master of Fine Arts degree. The book was a finalist for the Jim Deva Prize for Writing That Provokes.

== Awards and honours ==
In 2022, Spíləxm was selected for inclusion in White Ravens.

Awards for Campbell's writing
Year	Title	Award	Result	Ref.
2006	Shi-shi-etko	Anskohk Aboriginal Children's Book of the Year Award	Winner	
2006	Shi-shi-etko	Marilyn Baillie Picture Book Award	Finalist	
2006	Shi-shi-etko	TD Canadian Children's Literature Award	Finalist	
2009	Shin-chi's Canoe	TD Canadian Children's Literature Award	Winner	
2009	Shin-chi's Canoe	Marilyn Baillie Picture Book Award	Finalist	
2010	Shin-chi’s Canoe	Forest of Reading Silver Birch Award	Finalist	
2012	Grandpa's Girls	Christie Harris Illustrated Children's Literature Prize	Finalist	
2018	A Day with Yayah	Christie Harris Illustrated Children's Literature Prize	Finalist	
2022	Spíləx̣m	Jim Deva Prize for Writing that Provokes	Finalist	

== Publications ==
=== Children's books ===
- Shi-shi-etko, illustrated by Kim LaFave, Groundwood Books (2005)
- Shin-chi's Canoe, illustrated by Kim LaFave, Groundwood Books (2008)
- Grandpa's Girls, illustrated by Kim LaFave, Groundwood Books (2011)
- A Day with Yayah, illustrated by Julie Flett, Tradewind Books (2017)
- Stand Like a Cedar, illustrated by Carrielynn Victor, HighWater Press (2021)

=== Memoir ===
- Spíləx̣m: A Weaving of Recovery, Resilience, and Resurgence, HighWater Press (2021)

=== Contributions ===
- "alpine mountains" and "frog whispers" in Resurgence: Engaging With Indigenous Narratives and Cultural Expressions In and Beyond the Classroom, edited by Christine M'Lot and Katya Ferguson
- "how do I decolonize through stories?" in Room (2022), vol. 44, issue 4, p. 16
- "when an elder turns their gaze" in Room (2022), vol. 44, issue 4, p. 14
- "work in progress" in Room (2022), vol. 44, issue 4, p. 9
- "work in progress too" in Room (2022), vol. 44, issue 4, p. 11
