= Qin Leng =

Children's book illustrator and author

Qin Leng is a Canada-based children's book illustrator and author. She also worked creating illustrations for children's television. Her picture book illustrations have won her a Asian/Pacific American Award for Literature and Governor General's Award, among other honours.

Leng was born in Shanghai and has a twin sister. Their father is an artist. Leng later moved to France, then Montreal, where she graduated from the Mel Hoppenheim School of Cinema. She published her first picture book in 2009. As of 2025, she was based in Toronto with her husband and son.

== Awards and honours ==
Three of Leng's books have been named Notable Children's Books by the Association for Library Service to Children: Piper Green and the Fairy Tree (2015) by Ellen Potter, Over the Shop (2021) by JonArno Lawson, and At the Window (2025) by Hope Lim.

Books Leng illustrated have frequently appeared in year-end best of lists. In 2015, Shelf Awareness named Piper Green and the Fairy Tree one of the best children's books of the year. In 2021, The Bulletin of the Center for Children's Books named Over the Shop one of the year's best picture books. The following year, The Bulletin and Publishers Weekly named A Day for Sandcastles won of the year's best picture books.

Awards for Leng's work
Year	Title	Award	Result	Ref.
2014	Hana Hashimoto, Sixth Violin	Governor General's Award for English-language children's illustration	Finalist	
2014–2015	Hana Hashimoto, Sixth Violin	Asian/Pacific American Award for Literature (Picture Book)	Winner	
2015	Hana Hashimoto, Sixth Violin	Christie Harris Illustrated Children's Literature Prize	Finalist	
2015	Norman, Speak!	Christie Harris Illustrated Children's Literature Prize	Finalist	
2016	Song for a Summer Night	Christie Harris Illustrated Children's Literature Prize	Finalist	
2022	Trèfle	Governor General's Award for French-language children's illustration	Winner	
2025	Le tasse de Gilles	Governor General's Award for French-language children's illustration	Finalist	

== Publications ==
=== Standalone books ===
- Tsiang, Sarah (2010). A Flock of Shoes. Illustrated by Qin Leng. Annick.
- Foggo, Cheryl (2011). Dear Baobab. Illustrated by Qin Leng. Second Story Press.
- Tsiang, Sarah (2012). Dogs Don't Eat Jam and Other Things Big Kids Know. Illustrated by Qin Leng. Annick.
- Tsiang, Sarah (2012). The Stone Hatchlings. Illustrated by Qin Leng. Annick.
- Lloyd, Jennifer (2013). The Best Thing About Kindergarten. Illustrated by Qin Leng. Simply Read.
- MacLeod, Elizabeth; Wishinsky, Frieda (2013). A History of Just About Everything: 180 Events, People and Inventions that Changed the World. Illustrated by Qin Leng. Kids Can Press.
- Uluadluak, Donald (2013). Kamik: An Inuit Puppy Story. Illustrated by Qin Leng. Inhabit Media.
- Adderson, Caroline (2014). Norman, Speak!. Illustrated by Qin Leng. Groundwood Books.
- Mikkigak, Qaunaq; Schwartz, Joanne (2014). Grandmother Ptarmigan. Illustrated by Qin Leng. Inhabit Media.
- Uegaki, Chieri (2014). Hana Hashimoto, Sixth Violin. Illustrated by Qin Leng. Kids Can Press.
- Sulurayok, Matilda (2015). Kamik's First Sled. Illustrated by Qin Leng. Inhabit Media.
- Cole, Kathryn (2015). Fifteen Dollars and Thirty-Five Cents: A Story About Choices. Illustrated by Qin Leng. Second Story Press.
- Cole, Kathryn (2015). Never Give Up: A Story About Self-Esteem. Illustrated by Qin Leng. Second Story Press.
- Heidbreder, Robert (2015). Song for a Summer Night: A Lullaby. Illustrated by Qin Leng. Groundwood Books.
- Baker, Darryl (2016). Kamik Joins the Pack. Illustrated by Qin Leng. Inhabit Media.
- Cole, Kathryn (2015). That Uh-Oh Feeling: A Story About Touch. Illustrated by Qin Leng. Second Story Press.
- Hainnu, Rebecca (2016). A Walk on the Shoreline. Illustrated by Qin Leng. Inhabit Media.
- Kulling, Monica (2016). Happy Birthday, Alice Babette. Illustrated by Qin Leng. Groundwood Books.
- O'Leary, Sara (2016). A Family Is A Family Is A Family. Illustrated by Qin Leng. Groundwood Books.
- Rusch, Elizabeth (2016). Ready, Set... Baby. Illustrated by Qin Leng. Houghton Mifflin Harcourt.
- Stinson, Kathy (2016). Harry and Walter. Illustrated by Qin Leng. Annick Press.
- Claire, Céline (2017). L'abri (in French). Illustrated by Qin Leng. Comme des Géants.
  - Claire, Céline (2017). Shelter. Illustrated by Qin Leng. Kids Can Press.
- Sher, Emil (2017). Away. Illustrated by Qin Leng. Groundwood Books.
- Hopkinson, Deborah (2018). Ordinary, Extraordinary Jane Austin. Harpercollins US.
- Kerrin, Jessica Scott (2018). The Better Tree Fort. Groundwood Books.
- Lee, Dennis (2018). Good Night, Good Night. Harpercollins Canada.
- Leng, Qin (2018). Je suis petite (in French). Comme des Géants.
  - Leng, Qin (2018). I Am Small. Kids Can Press.
- Arnold, Marsha Diane (2019). Mine. Yours. Illustrated by Qin Leng. Kids Can Press.
- Balasubramaniam, Saumiya (2019). When I Found Grandma. Illustrated by Qin Leng. Groundwood Books.
- Sharon, Lois & Bram; Hampson, Randi (2019). Skinnamarink. Illustrated by Qin Leng. Penguin Random House.
- Klein, Cheryl B. (2020). A Year of Everyday Wonders. Illustrated by Qin Leng. Abrams Books.
- Lawson, JonArno (2021). Over the Shop. Illustrated by Qin Leng. Candlewick Press.
- O'Leary, Sara (2021). A Kid Is A Kid Is A Kid. Illustrated by Qin Leng. Groundwood Books.
- Lawson, JonArno (2022). A Day for Sandcastles. Illustrated by Qin Leng. Candlewick Press.
- Robert, Nadine (2022). Trèfle (in French). Illustrated by Qin Leng. Comme des Géants.
  - Robert, Nadine (2022). Clover. Illustrated by Qin Leng. Milky Way.
- Sharon, Lois & Bram; Hampson, Randi (2022). One Elephant Went out to Play. Illustrated by Qin Leng. Penguin Random House.
- Zihan, Mei (2022). New Year. Illustrated by Qin Leng. Greystone.
- Beaulieu, Baptiste (2023). Les Gens Sont Beaux (in French). Illustrated by Qin Leng. Les Arènes.
- Sharon, Lois & Bram; Hampson, Randi (2023). Peanut Butter and Jelly. Illustrated by Qin Leng. Penguin Random House.
- Suzuki, David; Kyi, Tanya Lloyd (2023). Bompa's Insect Expedition. Illustrated by Qin Leng. Greystone.
- Soo, Phillipa; Doran, Maris Pasquale (2024). Piper Chen Sings. Illustrated by Qin Leng. Penguin Random House.
  - Soo, Phillipa; Doran, Maris Pasquale (2025). Si ça te chante (in French). Illustrated by Qin Leng. Little Urban.
- Trudeau, Catherine (2024). La Tasse de Gilles (in French). Illustrated by Qin Leng. La Pastèque.
- Leng, Qin (2025). Fantastic Lou. Illustrated by Qin Leng. Tundra Books.
  - Leng, Qin (2025). Fantastique Lou (in French). Illustrated by Qin Leng. DARGAUD.
- Lim, Hope (2025). At the Window. Illustrated by Qin Leng. Candlewick Press.
  - Lim, Hope (2025). Par la fenêtre (in French). Illustrated by Qin Leng. Saltimbanque Editions.
- O'Leary, Sara (2026). A Friend Is A Friend Is A Friend. Illustrated by Qin Leng. Groundwood Books.
- Paul, Pamela (2026). The Path. Illustrated by Qin Leng. Putnam.
- Tokuda-Hall, Maggie (2026). What Do People Do at the Science Museum?. Illustrated by Qin Leng. Chronicle.

=== Piper Green series ===
- Potter, Ellen (2015). Piper Green and the Fairy Tree. Illustrated by Qin Leng. Penguin Random House.
- Potter, Ellen (2015). Too Much Good Luck. Illustrated by Qin Leng. Penguin Random House.
- Potter, Ellen (2016). The Sea Pony. Illustrated by Qin Leng. Penguin Random House.
- Potter, Ellen (2017). Going Places. Illustrated by Qin Leng. Penguin Random House.
- Potter, Ellen (2017). Pie Girl. Illustrated by Qin Leng. Penguin Random House.
