= Tradewind Books =

Canadian publisher of children's literature

- Founded: 1996
- Founders: Michael Katz, Carol Frank
- Country of origin: Canada
- Headquarters location: Vancouver, British Columbia
- Distribution: Fitzhenry & Whiteside (Canada); Orca Books (US); Turnaround Publisher Services (UK); John Reed Books (Australia)
- Key people: Michael Katz, Publisher; Carol Frank, Co-publisher and Art Director; Aidan Parker, Senior Editor
- Publication types: Books
- Fiction genres: Children's Literature
- Official website: tradewindbooks.com

Tradewind Books is a small Canadian publisher of children’s literature located in Vancouver, British Columbia. The company was founded in 1996 by Michael Katz and Carol Frank, and their titles have since been internationally recognized for their illustrations, writing, and design. They release six to eight publications each year, including picture books, poetry books, chapter books, and young adult novels.

== History and Mandate ==
Founded by Michael Katz and Carol Frank in 1996, Tradewind Books has over 100 titles in print. Their current office is located on Granville Island.

Tradewind Books is committed to promoting multiculturalism in Canada, and frequently publishes books showcasing worldwide points of view. Their books span ethnicities and locations throughout North America, such as Canadian aboriginals and Chinese Americans, and around the world, including Egypt, Mexico and the Caribbean. Their titles have been translated into French, German, Portuguese, and Korean.

== Distribution ==
Tradewind Books is distributed by Fitzhenry & Whiteside in Canada, Orca Books in the US, Turnaround Publisher Services in the UK, and John Reed Books in Australia. Tradewind has also sold co-edition and translation rights to publishers in various countries, including the US, Mexico, Korea and Portugal.

== Awards and recognition ==
Books and authors published by Tradewind Books have been recognized and awarded around the world. Anna Carries Water, a best selling picture book written by Olive Senior and illustrated by Laura James, is the recipient of many accolades including a New York Public Library Best Book of 2014. A Day With Yayah, written by Nicola Campbell and illustrated by Julie Flett was a finalist for the BC Book Prize in 2018, and was listed as a resource in the BC First Peoples 12 Teacher Resource Guide, created by the First Nations Education Steering Committee. Black Dog Dream Dog, written by Michele Superle and illustrated by Millie Ballance, and Honey Cake, written by Joan Betty Stuchner and illustrated by Cynthia Nugent, both won the Chocolate Lily Award. Another book illustrated by Millie Ballance, The Eco Diary of Kiran Singer, written by Sue Ann Alderson, won the Henry Bergh Children's Book Award (2007). The King Has Goat Ears, written by Katarina Jovanovic and illustrated by Philippe Béha, won the Christie Harris Illustrated Children's Literature Prize (2009 BC Book Prizes). Abby's Birds, written by Ellen Schwartz and illustrated by Sima Elizabeth Shefrin, won the Elizabeth-Mrazik Cleaver Award for Illustration (2007).

In 2012, Paul Yee, author of eight titles for Tradewind, was awarded the Vicky Metcalf Award for Children's Literature by the Writers' Trust of Canada for his lifetime achievement.
