= A Day with Yayah =

2017 children's book by Nicola I. Campbell and Julie Flett

- Author: Nicola I. Campbell
- Illustrator: Julie Flett
- Language: English, Nłeʔkepmxcín
- Genre: Children's literature
- Publisher: Tradewind Books
- Publication date: 2017
- Publication place: Canada
- Media type: Print (hardcover)
- Pages: 32
- Awards: Ânskohk Aboriginal Children's Book of the Year.
- ISBN: 978-1-92689-009-8

A Day with Yayah is a 2017 book written by Nicola I. Campbell and illustrated by Julie Flett. The text is largely in English but includes twelve words in Nłeʔkepmxcín, the language of the Nłeʔképmx people of the Inner Salish indigenous peoples. These words include Yayah, Campbell's Anglicisation of the Nłeʔkepmxcín word yéye, meaning "grandmother".

In an interview with CBC Books, Campbell explained that she didn't want tragedy to be the only story told by and about Indigenous people. Instead, she wanted to write a book that helped Indigenous people feel "empowered".

== Plot summary ==
Three children, Nikki, Jamesie Pookins, and Lenny, ask to go foraging with their grandmother. She drives them and some other relatives to the foraging site, where together they find food-plants, learn about dangerous plants and the importance of correctly identifying plants, and learn the properties of the plants and their Nłeʔkepmxcín names. When lunchtime arrives they sit and eat a picnic; the children lament that lightning mushrooms are not marshmallows; and they render the food they have gathered to their elders.

== Nłeʔkepmxcín vocabulary ==
As the children forage, their grandmother teachers them relevant vocabulary in Nłeʔkepmxcín; she always refers to the children by the Nłeʔkepmxcín term scmém’iʔt. The book closes with a note about the Nłeʔkepmx people and Nłeʔkepmxcín language, along with a glossary of Nłeʔkepmxcín words encountered in the book and Campbell's guide to pronouncing them. The following table lists these words along with links to their entries in the FirstVoices dictionary, which give recordings of native-speaker pronunciations.

Spelling in A Day with Yayah	Spelling in FirstVoices dictionary	Campbell's pronunciation guide	Meaning according to Campbell
Yéye	yéyeʔ	Yayah	Grandmother
hékʷuʔ	hekʷúʔ	ha-kwoo	wild rhubarb, a.k.a. cow parsnip
c’ewéteʔ	c̓eweteʔ	tse-weh-tah	wild celery
tetúwn’	tetúwn̓	tah-too-wn	wild potatoes, a.k.a. western spring beauty root
scmém’iʔt	scmémiʔt	s-cha-mem-eet	children
kʷukʷstéyp	kʷukʷscéyp	kw-ookw-sh-tay-p	thankyou (said with honor and respect)
kʷukʷscémxʷ	kʷukʷscémxʷ	kw-ookw-sh-jam-x	thankyou (for general use)
qʷámqʷəmt	qʷámqʷəmt	qwam-qwem-t	beautiful, wonderful
łaʔx̣ans	ɬaʔx̣áns	lh-aaah-hun-sh	time to eat
tmíxʷ	tmíxʷ	tm-ee-xw	our land, the land
nkiʔkix̣qín	nkiʔkiʔx̣qín	n-kee-keh-x-qiyn	lightning mushrooms, a.k.a. field mushrooms, meadow mushrooms
sóx̣ʷm’	sóx̣ʷm̓	sh-uxw-em	wild sunflowers, a.k.a. arrowleaf balsamroot

== Reception ==
The book was awarded four stars when reviewed in The Deakin Review of Children's Literature. The reviewer, Lydia Thorne, particularly noted the book's inclusion of words in Nłeʔkepmxcín, and the value of the book in a context where the Inner Salishan languages are endangered.

In the assessment of Jane Newland, "A Day with Yayah allow[s] Flett to demonstrate her skill at depicting the immensity of the [...] British Columbian settings. With her bold forms and striking colours, Flett captures the beauty of these vast landscapes while maintaining her eye for intricate detail in the flora and fauna found there."

Similarly, Selena Mills found that "Flett adds to the rich themes of resilience and resurgence with her enchanting, folk-like paintings. Together, Campbell and Flett transport readers on a bilingual learning journey with the intergenerational characters as they savour the pronunciation of each syllable of Nłeʔkepmxcín words slowly, together."

Beverley Brenna, Richard Dionne, and Theresa Tavares assessed the book as being suitable "for ages 5–10+", while the University of Calgary's Books to Build on: Indigenous Literatures for Learning survey emphasised the suitability of the book as a resource for teaching about plants.

== Awards ==
2018	Christie Harris Illustrated Children's Literature Prize
	Ânskohk Aboriginal Children's Book of the Year.
