= Anne Renaud =

Canadian writer

- Born: Valleyfield, Quebec, Canada
- Occupation: Writer
- Writing career
- Language: English, French
- Subject: Historical nonfiction for children
- Notable works: Fania's Heart; Mr. Crum's Potato Predicament
- Notable awards: Canadian Jewish Literary Award for Children and Youth Fiction (2018); Janet Savage Blachford Prize (2018)
- Website: annerenaud.net

Anne Renaud is a Westmount, Quebec-based Canadian writer of nonfiction, fiction and poetry for children.

== Early life and education ==
Renaud was born in Valleyfield, Quebec. She "is a descendent of English, Irish, and French immigrants." While researching for her book Island of Hope and Sorrow, "she discovered that the ship on which her grandmother sailed to Canada in 1907 had made a stope at Grosse-Île before the family settled in Richmond, Quebec."

== Career ==
Renaud writes informative historical nonfiction for children on the subjects of immigration to Canada, World War II, and extraordinary life stories of actual people. Her books educate, entertain and inspire children, and have been short-listed for various awards, including the Hackmatack Children's Choice Award, the Red Maple, the Silver Birch and the Red Cedar.

She is also a regular contributor to children's magazines, such as Highlights for Children, Cricket, and Odyssey.

== Awards and nominations ==
Bank Street College of Education included Mr. Crum's Potato Predicament in their 2018 "Best Book for Kids & Teens" list, as did the Canadian Children's Book Centre.

Awards for Renaud's writing
Year	Title	Award	Result	Ref.
2013	The Extraordinary Life of Anna Swan	BC Young Readers' Choice Red Cedar Book Award	Finalist	
2013	The Extraordinary Life of Anna Swan	Hackmatack Children's Choice Book Award	Shortlist	
2013	The Extraordinary Life of Anna Swan	Quebec Writers' Federation Prize for Children's & Young Adult Literature	Shortlist	
2013	The Extraordinary Life of Anna Swan	Forest of Reading Silver Birch Award	Nominee	
2018	Fania's Heart	Canadian Jewish Literary Award for Children and Youth Fiction	Winner	
2018	Mr. Crum's Potato Predicament	Janet Savage Blachford Prize	Winner	
2021	Albertine Petit-Brindamour déteste les choux de Bruxelles	Prix Harry Black de l’album jeunesse	Finalist	

== Selected works ==
- How the Sea Came to Marissa (Beyond Words, 2006) ISBN 978-1582701295
- Island of Hope and Sorrow: The Story of Grosse Ile (Lobster, 2007) ISBN 978-1897073544
- Pier 21: Stories from Near and Far (Lobster, 2008) ISBN 978-1897073704
- Missuk's Snow Geese, illustrated by Geneviève Côté (Simply Read Books, 2008) ISBN 978-1894965828
- Into the Mist: The Story of the Empress of Ireland (Dundurn, 2010) ISBN 978-1-55488-759-0
- Emma's Gems (2012)
- Mousseline Vole au Vent (Dominique et Compagnie, 2012) ISBN 978-2896861446
- The Extraordinary Life of Anna Swan (Cape Breton University, 2013) ISBN 978-1897009994
- Les pierres d'Emma (Dominique et Compagnie, 2013) ISBN 978-2896860531
- Amande lavande (Dominique et Compagnie, 2014) ISBN 978-2896865055
- The Boy Who Invented the Popsicle: The Cool Science Behind Frank Epperson's Famous Frozen Treat, illustrated by Milan Pavlović (2014)
- A Bloom of Friendship: The Story of the Canadian Tulip Festival (Whitecap Books, 2014) ISBN 978-1770502154
- Fania's Heart, illustrated by Richard Rudnicki (Second Story Press, 2018) ISBN 9781772600575
- Mr. Crum's Potato Predicament, illustrated by Felicita Sala (2018)
- The True Tale of a Giantess: The Story of Anna Swan, illustrated by Marie Lafrance (Kids Can Press, 2018) ISBN 9781771383769
- Albertine Petit-Brindamour déteste les choux de Bruxelles, illustrated by Élodie Duhameau (La courte échelle, 2020) ISBN 9782897743215
- Gwendolyn's Pet Garden, illustrated by Rashin Kheiriyeh (Nancy Paulsen Books, 2021) ISBN 9781984815286)
- Je suis un livre, illustrated by c (Bayard Canada, 2021) ISBN 9782897703462
- Les oreilles de Chester, with Félix Girard (DE L'ISATIS, 2021) ISBN 9782925088134
- Ferdinand Cheval: The Postman Who Delivered a Palace, illustrated by Ana Salopek (2022) ISBN 9781478875949
