= Linda Bailey =

Canadian author

- Born: 1948 (age 77–78); Winnipeg, Manitoba, Canada
- Education: University of British Columbia (BA, MA)
- Occupation: Children's author
- Children: 2
- Writing career
- Years active: 1992–present
- Notable awards: Vicky Metcalf Award (2021)
- Website: lindabaileybooks.com

Linda Bailey (born 1948) is a Canadian author who has written dozens of books for children, including Mary Who Wrote Frankenstein, and the Stevie Diamond mystery series. In 2021, she received the Vicky Metcalf Award for Literature for Young People, an honour bestowed by the Writers' Trust of Canada to Canadian writers and illustrators whose work has been "inspirational to Canadian youth".

== Person life and education ==
Born in 1948, Bailey was born and raised in Winnipeg. She enjoyed reading from an early age and cites public libraries and a bookmobile in Winnipeg as her largest influences.

As a young adult, Bailey briefly lived in Melbourne, Australia, before returning to Canada. She studied English at the University of British Columbia, where she earned both a bachelor's and a master's degree.

She is the mother of two daughters, including evolutionary ecologist Tess Grainger.

== Literary career ==
In 1992, Bailey published her first book, How Come the Best Clues are Always in the Garbage?, the first installment in the Stevie Diamond mystery series. The story follows Stephanie, a sixth-grade girl from Vancouver who investigates the theft of money from her mother's charity project. Bailey published a total of seven books in the series between 1992 and 2002.

In addition to the Stevie Diamond books, Bailey is also the author of the middle-grade series "Good Times Travel Agency," which follows the adventures of the time-travelling Binkerton family on their trips through history.

Bailey has published almost 40 books over the course of her career.

=== Awards and honours ===
In 2021, Bailey earned the Vicky Metcalf Award for Literature for Young People by the Writers' Trust of Canada.

Mary Who Wrote Frankenstein was listed as a Best Book of the Year by Booklist, Publishers Weekly, the New York Public Library, and The Globe and Mail, among others.

Awards for Bailey's writing
Year	Title	Award	Result	Ref.
1995	How Can I Be A Detective If I Have To Babysit?	Forest of Reading Silver Birch Award	Finalist	
1997	How Can a Frozen Detective Stay Hot on the Trail?	Arthur Ellis Award for Best Juvenile or Young Adult Crime Book	Winner	
2000	How Can A Brilliant Detective Shine in the Dark?	Arthur Ellis Award for Best Juvenile or Young Adult Crime Book	Winner	
2000	How Can A Brilliant Detective Shine in the Dark?	Forest of Reading Silver Birch Award for Fiction	Finalist	
2001	Adventure in the Middle Ages	Forest of Reading Silver Birch Award for Nonfiction	Winner	
2002	The Best Figure Skater in the Whole Wide World	Forest of Reading Blue Spruce Award	Finalist	
2003	Adventures in the Middle Age	Red Cedar Award for Nonfiction	Winner	
2003	Adventures with the Vikings	Forest of Reading Silver Birch Award for Nonfiction	Finalist	
2003	Adventures with the Vikings	Hackmatack Children's Choice Book Award	Winner	
2004	Adventures in Ancient China	Christie Harris Illustrated Children's Literature Prize	Finalist	
2004	Adventures in Ancient China	Forest of Reading Silver Birch Award for Nonfiction	Finalist	
2004	Stanley's Party	Chocolate Lily Young Readers' Choice Award	Winner	
2004	Stanley's Party	Christie Harris Illustrated Children's Literature Prize	Winner	
2004	Stanley's Party	Forest of Reading Blue Spruce Award	Winner	
2004	Stanley's Party	Shining Willow Award	Winner	
2006	Adventures in the Ice Age	Hackmatack Children's Choice Book Award	Winner	
2007	Stanley's Party	Time To Read: The BC Achievement Foundation Award For Early Literacy	Winner	
2007	Stanley's Wild Ride	Forest of Reading Blue Spruce Award	Finalist	
2008	The Farm Team	Forest of Reading Blue Spruce Award	Finalist	
2008	Stanley's Wild Ride	Chocolate Lily Young Readers' Choice Award	Winner	
2009	Stanley At Sea	Christie Harris Illustrated Children's Literature Prize	Finalist	
2009	Stanley At Sea	Forest of Reading Blue Spruce Award	Finalist	
2009	Stanley's Wild Ride	California Young Reader Medal	Winner	
2010	Stanley's Beauty Contest	Forest of Reading Blue Spruce Award	Finalist	
2012	Stanley's Little Sister	Chocolate Lily Young Readers' Choice Award	Winner	
2012	Stanley's Little Sister	Forest of Reading Blue Spruce Award	Finalist	
2014	Toads on Toast	Chocolate Lily Young Readers' Choice Award	Winner	
2016	If Kids Ruled the World	Forest of Reading Blue Spruce Award	Winner	
2017	Seven Dead Pirates	Forest of Reading Silver Birch Award for Fiction	Finalist	
2017	Stanley at School	Forest of Reading Blue Spruce Award	Finalist	
2018	Under-the-Bed Fred	Chocolate Lily Award	Shortlist	
2020	Mary Who Wrote Frankenstein	Forest of Reading Silver Birch Award	Finalist	
2021	Princesses Versus Dinosaurs	Christie Harris Illustrated Children's Literature Prize	Finalist	

== Bibliography ==
=== Stevie Diamond series ===
- How Come the Best Clues are Always in the Garbage? (1992)
- How Can I Be a Detective if I Have to Baby-sit? (1993)
- Who's Got Gertie? And How Can We Get Her Back? (1994)
- How Can a Frozen Detective Stay Hot on the Trail? (1996)
- What's a Daring Detective Like Me Doing in the Doghouse? (1997)
- How Can a Brilliant Detective Shine in the Dark? (1999)
- What is a Serious Detective Like Me Doing in Such a Silly Movie? (2002)

=== Good Times Travel Agency series ===
- Adventures in Ancient Egypt (2000)
  - Republished as Hot on the Trail in Ancient Egypt (2018)
- Adventures in the Middle Ages (2000)
- Adventures with the Vikings (2001)
  - Republished as Stowing Away With the Vikings (2018)
- Adventures in Ancient Greece (2002)
  - Republished as Game on in Ancient Greece (2019)
- Adventures in Ancient China (2003)
  - Republished as On the Run in Ancient China (2019)
- Adventures in the Ice Age (2004)

=== Other works ===
- Petula, Who Wouldn't Take a Bath (1996)
- Gordon Loggins and the Three Bears (1997)
- When Addie Was Scared (1999)
- The Best Figure Skater in the Whole Wide World (2001)
- Stanley's Party (2003)
- Stanley's Wild Ride (2006)
- The Farm Team (2006)
- Goodnight, Sweet Pig (2007)
- Seven Dead Pirates (2015)
- When Santa Was a Baby (2015, with Geneviève Godbout)
- If You Happen to Have a Dinosaur (2017, with Colin Jack)
- Mary Who Wrote Frankenstein (2018)
- Under-the-Bed Fred (2017)
- The Tiny Hero of Ferny Creek Library (2017)
- Princesses Versus Dinosaurs (2020)
- Carson Crosses Canada (2020, with Kass Reich)
- Arthur Who Wrote Sherlock (2022)
- Cinderella-with Dogs! (2023)
