= Ohotaq Mikkigak =

Inuk artist (1936-2014)

- Born: 1936
- Died: 2014 (aged 77–78)

Ohotaq (Oqutaq) Mikkigak (Inuktitut: ᒥᑭᒐ, 1936 - 2014) was a Cape Dorset (now Kinngait) based Inuk artist from southern Baffin Island. Mikkigak was involved with Cape Dorset printmaking in the program's early years, providing drawn designs for printing. Many of his works were printed and featured in the studio's annual collections, including Eskimo Fox Trapper and three pieces used in the Cape Dorset Studio's 40th anniversary collection. Mikkigak's work has also been included in of over twenty group exhibitions and was the subject of multiple solo exhibitions, including a show held by Feheley Fine Arts called Ohotaq Mikkigak: Imagined Landscapes.

== Career ==
=== Formative years ===
Mikkigak drew for the Cape Dorset printmaking program when it was in its early stages of operation. His first printed work, Eskimo Fox Trapper, was realized in 1961. As the printmaking studio progressed, Mikkigak partially withdrew his participation, beginning to work full-time for numerous community-based agencies. Following his retirement from caretaking at the Peter Pitseolak School in Cape Dorset, Mikkigak returned to drawing, and three of his works were included in the Cape Dorset print studio's 40th anniversary collection (released in 1999). Three lithographed versions of his works used the chine collé technique, and were included in the Annual Print Collection of 2001. A print of Mikkigak's work called Three Ravens (2001-2005) was also included in 2001 catalogue for the West Baffin Eskimo Co-Operative (Kinngait Co-operative).

=== Later career ===
Mikkigak's first solo exhibition of drawings and prints was held in September 2010 at Feheley Fine Arts in Toronto, Ontario. He had another solo show at Feheley Fine Arts in November 2012 called Ohotaq Mikkigak: Imagined Landscapes. Also in 2012, Mikkigak exhibited several large-scale drawings alongside the works of fellow Canadian artist Jack Bush at the Justina M. Barnicke Gallery at the University of Toronto. Mikkigak's other group exhibitions include:

== Selected exhibits ==
- June–July, 2010: North Meets South, Feheley Fine Arts (Toronto, Ontario)
- July–December, 2010: Nipirasait (Many Voices): Inuit Prints from Cape Dorset, Canadian Embassy (Washington, D.C., United States)
- June, 2011: Dorset Large: Large Scale drawings from the Kinngait Studios, Feheley Fine Arts (Toronto, Ontario)
- February–March, 2012: Dorset Now, Feheley Fine Arts (Toronto, Ontario)
- October, 2012: 2012 Cape Dorset Annual Print Collection, Galerie d'Art Vincent (Ottawa, Ontario)
- April–June, 2013: Dorset Seen, Carleton University Art Gallery (Ottawa, Ontario)
- October, 2013: Toronto International Art Fair, Metro Toronto Convention Centre (Toronto, Ontario)
- October–November, 2013: The Hand of the Artist, Feheley Fine Arts (Toronto, Ontario)

== Collections ==
Mikkigak's work is featured in several collections including:

- The Brooklyn Museum (Brooklyn, New York, U.S.)
- The Canadian Museum of History (Hull, Quebec)
- The Dennos Museum Center at Northwestern Michigan College (Traverse City, Michigan, U.S.)
- The Glenbow Museum (Calgary, Alberta)
- The Klamer Family Collection at the Art Gallery of Ontario (Toronto, Ontario)
- The McMichael Canadian Art Collection (Kleinburg, Ontario)
- The Musée national des beaux-arts du Québec, Québec
- The National Gallery of Canada (Ottawa)
- The Arnold Aubert Vernon Inuit Collection at Louisiana State University (Baton Rouge, Louisiana, U.S.)
- The University of Michigan Museum of Art (Ann Arbor, Michigan, U.S.)
- The Winnipeg Art Gallery (Winnipeg, Manitoba)

== Major influences ==
Mikkigak's time hunting on the land and stories from his grandmother highly influenced his work. It is noted that he did not look to colonial artists or art history for artistic inspiration. It has been observed that Inuit artists of Mikkigak's period drew significant inspiration from the apprenticeship structure of Arctic co-ops (such as the Cape Dorset printmaking studio). While Mikkigak was a practicing artist, he worked with James Houston and others based out of the Cape Dorsert (Kinngait) printmaking studio's first location, a government-issued building known as the sanaguavik. Houston was known for encouraging Inuit artists to draw based on their isumanniivit (their own thoughts), which is likely to have influenced Mikkigak's work.

== Style ==
Mikkigak's work covered a board spectrum of subjects and themes, and was often done in pencil crayon (a medium that was particularly prevalent among Inuit graphic artists). Mikkigak's work also consistently emphasized the sky and weather patterns, often using an aerial view for the composition. It was common for artists, including Mikkigak, to use Inuktitut syllabics at the bottom of a piece in order to explain the scene in detail, as well as to use larger formats and manipulate scale in order to convey the Arctic landscape's expansiveness. A theme in Mikkigak and other Inuit artists' work is the use of landscapes to represent memories connected to the represented land, rather than purely the reality of the scene depicted. Mikkigak's drawings did not seek to abstract the landscape, despite his later images taking on a more contemporary style and tone. Instead, he took inspiration from both imagined and real spaces in order to represent their expansive and all-encompassing nature, while focalizing Northern Canada as a fertile rather than barren landscape of colour and open space. He is noted for his autobiographical illustrations, and has said that he enjoyed making drawings filled with colour; especially landscapes, and scenes using animals (particularly birds) and people.

== Personal life ==
Mikkigak was married to Qaunak Mikkigak (sometimes spelled Haunak or Qaunak), an Inuk throat singer and carver. They lived the traditional Inuit lifestyle together before settling in Cape Dorset.

== Bibliography ==
- "Available Prints by Ohotaq Mikkigak." Dorset Fine Arts. Accessed March 16, 2018. http://www.dorsetfinearts.com/available-prints-by-ohotaq-mikkigak/.
- Campbell, Nancy. "Inuit Artist Ohotaq Mikkigak Draws on Landscapes of Ice and Memory." Canadian Art. November 2, 2012. Accessed March 16, 2018. https://canadianart.ca/features/the-colour-of-ice-ohotaq-mikkigak-and-the-landscape-of-memory/.
- "Mikkigak, Ohotaq." Canadian Art Prints and Winn Devon. Accessed March 16, 2018. http://capandwinndevon.com/brand/mikkigak-ohotaq/.
- "Ohotaq Mikkigak." Artsy. Accessed March 16, 2018. https://www.artsy.net/artist/ohotaq-mikkigak.
- "Ohotaq Mikkigak." DaVic Gallery of Native Canadian Arts. Accessed March 16, 2018. https://nativecanadianarts.com/artist/ohotaq-mikkigak/.
- "Ohotaq Mikkigak." Dorset Fine Arts. Accessed March 23, 2018. http://www.dorsetfinearts.com/ohotaq-mikkigak/.
- "Ohotaq Mikkigak." Inuit Art Zone. Accessed March 16, 2018. https://www.inuitartzone.com/collections/mikkigak-ohotaq.
- "Ohotaq Mikkigak." National Gallery of Canada. Accessed March 16, 2018. https://www.gallery.ca/collection/artist/ohotaq-mikkigak.
- "Ohotaq (Oqutaq) Mikkigak (1936-2014)." Spirit Wrestler Gallery. 2013. Accessed March 16, 2018. http://www.spiritwrestler.com/catalog/index.php?artists_id=64.
