= Trouble on Tarragon Island =

2005 novel by Nikki Tate

- Author: Nikki Tate
- Language: English
- Publication date: 2005
- Publication place: Canada

Trouble on Tarragon Island is a children's novel by Nikki Tate, the third novel in the Tarragon Island series. Released in Canada in 2005 by Sono Nis Press, it was nominated for a Chocolate Lily Award, a Diamond Willow Award, and a Red Cedar Book Award.

Like the earlier novels in the series, Tarragon Island (1999) and No Cafés in Narnia (2000), Trouble on Tarragon Island is set on a small fictional island in the Gulf of Georgia off Canada's West Coast in British Columbia. The main character is Heather Blake, a budding writer, who has moved there from Toronto with her family and has difficulty adjusting to life in a small community.

Heather's grandmother is the source of much controversy when she gets involved with a group of protesters called the Ladies of the Forest who oppose the logging of local old-growth trees. The conflict intensifies when arrests are made among the protesters and the situation escalates.

The book confronts moral quandaries regarding the role of protesters, journalists, and government policies and explores the boundaries within these roles.

In 2007, the book gained some notoriety due to a librarian withdrawing it from the shelves of a school in Kindersley, Saskatchewan. The librarian was offended in particular by the bullying scene, when Heather's grandmother poses for a nude calendar and is described by several boys as having generous "bazoongas." While the principal at the time defended the librarian's choice, a new principal has since reversed the decision.
