= Fania's Heart =

2018 children's picture book by Anne Renaud

- Author: Anne Renaud
- Illustrator: Richard Rudnicki
- Language: English
- Genre: Children's picture book
- Published: 2018 (Second Story Press)
- Publication place: Canada
- Media type: Print (hardback)
- Pages: 32 (unpaginated)
- ISBN: 9781772600575
- OCLC: 1000050916

Fania's Heart is a 2018 children's picture book by Anne Renaud. Based on a true story, it is about a girl, Sorale, who finds a small handmade book amongst her mother's possessions, and is then told the story behind it. The original book is held at the Montreal Holocaust Museum.

== Reception ==
Dina Weinstein, who reviewed Fania's Heart for Jewish Book Council, wrote "The inspiring story, which takes place in one of the most demeaning of settings, shows that even the powerless can provide hope and warmth to one other."

Fania's Heart has also been reviewed by Kirkus Reviews, Quill & Quire, CM: Canadian Review of Materials, School Library Journal, and Resource Links.

It won the 2018 Canadian Jewish Literary Award for Children and Youth Fiction.
