= Julie Morstad =

Canadian writer and illustrator of children's books

Julie Morstad is a Canadian writer and illustrator of children's books.

== Career ==
After coming to the attention of Simply Read Books publisher Dimiter Savoff through her work in the Vancouver arts scene, Morstad was asked to illustrate Sara O'Leary's When You Were Small in 2006. Morstad made her authorial debut in 2013 with How To, published by Simply Read Books.

== Awards and nominations ==
Morstad illustrated When You Were Small, which won the 2006 Marilyn Baillie Picture Book Award. She is a four-time nominee for the Governor General's Award for English-language Young People's Literature - Illustrated Books, receiving nods at the 2013 Governor General's Awards for How To, at the 2014 Governor General's Awards for Julia, Child, and at the 2022 Governor General's Awards for Time Is a Flower, and at the 2026 Governor General's Awards for A Door is to Open. How To and Time is a Flower also won the Marilyn Baillie Picture Book Award. In 2019, she won the Elizabeth Mrazik-Cleaver Canadian Picture Book Award for Bloom. It Began With a Page: How Gyo Fujikawa Drew the Way was nominated for the 2020 TD Canadian Children’s Literature Award.

== Personal life ==
Morstad has a brother named Paul. At age 20, she gave birth to her first child.

== Works ==
- When You Were Small (2006) – Illustrator, written by Sara O'Leary
- Milk Teeth (2007) – Illustrator
- Where You Came From (2008) – Illustrator, written by Sara O'Leary
- When I Was Small (2011) – Illustrator, written by Sara O'Leary
- The Wayside (2012) – Illustrator
- The Swing (2012) – Illustrator, written by Robert Louis Stevenson
- How To (2013) – Writer and illustrator
- Julia, Child (2014) – Illustrator, written by Kyo Maclear
- This Is Sadie, (2015) – Illustrator, written by Sara O'Leary
- Swan: The Life and Dance of Anna Pavlova (2015) – Illustrator, written by Laurel Snyder
- Sometimes We Think You Are a Monkey (2015) – Illustrator, written by Johanna Skibsrud and Sarah Blacker
- Today (2016) – Writer and illustrator
- When Green Becomes Tomatoes: Poems for All Seasons (2016) – Illustrator, written by Julie Fogliano
- Singing Away the Dark (2017) – Illustrator, written by Caroline Woodward
- Bloom: A Story of Fashion Designer Elsa Schiaparelli (2018) – Illustrator, written by Kyo Maclear
- The Dress and the Girl (2018) – Illustrator, written by Camille Andros
- House of Dreams: The Life of L. M. Montgomery (2018) – Illustrator, written by Liz Rosenberg
- It Began with a Page: How Gyo Fujikawa Drew the Way (2019) – Illustrator, written by Kyo Maclear
- Show Me A Sign (2020) – Illustrator, written by Ann Clare LeZotte
- Girl on a Motorcycle (2020) – Illustrator, written by Amy Novesky
- Time is a Flower (2022) – Writer and illustrator

Other:

- Cover art for Mary Ann Meets the Gravediggers and Other Short Stories (2006)
- Cover art for Fox Confessor Brings the Flood (2006)
