= Mr. Crum's Potato Predicament =

2017 Children's book by Anne Renaud

- Author: Anne Renaud
- Illustrator: Felicita Sala
- Genre: Picture book Children's literature
- ISBN: 978-1-77138-619-7

Mr. Crum's Potato Predicament is a picture book written by Anne Renaud and illustrated by Felicita Sala, published by Kids Can Press in 2017.

== Reception ==
Mr. Crum's Potato Predicament has received reviews from publications including The Globe and Mail, San Francisco Book Review, Kirkus Reviews, and School Library Journal.

== Awards ==
Bank Street College of Education included Mr. Crum's Potato Predicament in their 2018 "Best Children's Book's of the Year" list, as did the Canadian Children's Book Centre. The Ontario Library Association included it on their "OLA Best Bets" list.

Mr. Crum's Potato Predicament won the 2018 Quebec Writers' Federation's Janet Savage Blachford Prize.
