= Rashin Kheiriyeh =

Iranian and American artist, author, illustrator (born 1979)

- راشین خیریه
- Born: 1979 (age 46–47); Khorramshahr, Iran
- Education: Azadegan Art School, Al-Zahra University (MFA, PhD), New York University Institute of Fine Arts
- Occupations: Children's book author, illustrator, animator, graphic designer, painter, muralist

Rashin Kheiriyeh (Persian: راشین خیریه, romanized: Rāshīn Khayrīyah; born 1979) is an Iranian and American illustrator, children's book author, graphic designer, animator, and painter. She has written and illustrated more than 80 books.

== Life and career ==
Rashin Kheiriyeh was born in 1979, in Khorramshahr, in the Khuzestan province of Iran. Her family was forced to flee the area after the Iran–Iraq War started in 1980, when she was 9 months old. They settled in Tehran, and Kheiriyeh spent her childhood in Iran. She studied art and design in high school, which is when she began to paint. As a teen she studied at the Azadegan Art School in Tehran.

She later attended Al-Zahra University in Tehran, where she graduated with an MFA degree in graphic design, and Ph.D in illustration.

In 2005 and 2006, she was awarded the Best Book of the Year by the Tehran Book Council. Her work was included in an exhibit of 30 Iranian artists in 2007, which was organized as a way to improve cultural relations between Iran and the US. The exhibit debuted in Washington, D.C. and then traveled to various US states.

In 2011, she moved to the United States to take an art course at the New York University Institute of Fine Arts. That same year, she had a studio in New York City. She later moved to Arlington, Virginia, where she lived when her first book to be published in the United States, Two Parrots, was released. The children's book was the re-imagining of a story by the Persian poet Rumi. For the work, Kheiriyeh used oil paint on paper.

In 2018, she designed a Google Doodle of the Iranian national football team for the FIFA World Cup. Kheiriyeh used her experiences from her family's escape from the Iran-Iraq War as inspiration for her drawings in the 2020 picture book Story Boat. She created a mural in Santa Monica that advocated for freedom of women in Iran, which was unveiled in 2021.

== Works ==
=== Writing and illustration ===
- Two Parrots (2012)
- Saffron Ice Cream (2018)
- Bahar, The Lucky (2020)
- The Shape of Home (2021)
- Love on a Plate (2021)
- Rumi: Poet of Joy and Love (2024)

=== Illustration ===
- Story Boat (2020), written by Kyo Maclear
- Gwendolyn’s Pet Garden, written by Anne Renaud
- A Persian Passover (2022), written by Etan Basseri
- Welcome Home (2022), written by Reid Aimee
- The Night Before Eid (2023), written by Khalil Aya
- Eli and the Uncles (2024), written by Jehan Madhani
