= Gyo Fujikawa =

American writer and illustrator

Gyō Fujikawa 藤川堯
- Born: November 3, 1908; Berkeley, California, United States
- Died: November 26, 1998 (aged 90); New York City, New York, United States
- Occupations: artist, illustrator, writer
- Writing career
- Genre: Children's literature

Gyo Fujikawa (November 3, 1908 – November 26, 1998) was an American illustrator and children's book writer. A prolific creator of more than 50 books for children, her work is regularly in reprint and has been translated into 17 languages and published in 22 countries. Her most popular books, Babies and Baby Animals, have sold over 1.7 million copies in the U.S. Fujikawa is recognized for being the earliest mainstream illustrator of picture books to include children of many races in her work, before it became common to do so.

== Biography ==
Page from Babies, Grosset & Dunlap, 1963.

Gyo Fujikawa was born in Berkeley, California, to Japanese parents, Hikozō and Yūko Fujikawa (藤川幽子). The masculine name Gyo (pronounced "gyoh") is after a Chinese emperor her father admired.

Gyo Fujikawa moved to Los Angeles to attend Chouinard Art Institute in 1926, having received a scholarship, and befriended Japanese dancer Michio Ito and many fellow Nisei writers and artists. After graduating and spending a year in Japan, she was on the Chouinard faculty from 1933-1937. She worked for Walt Disney Productions in California as a promotional artist on Fantasia. In mid-1941 the studio relocated Fujikawa to New York; therefore, she avoided the forced internment of West Coast Japanese and Japanese Americans during World War II. Her family, however, spent the war in the internment camp at Rohwer, Arkansas.

According to Fujikawa, Walt Disney personally comforted her during this time. As she recalled:

Walt Disney was wonderful to me. [He] came to the office where I was working during the war. He came to see me especially. He said, "How are you doing? I've been worried about you." I said "I'm doing okay. If people ask me what nationality I am I tell them the truth or give them big lies, like I'm half-Chinese and half-Japanese, or part-Koreon, part-Chinese, and part-Japanese." He said "Why do you have to do that? For Christ's sake, you're an American citizen. Next time anybody asks you that, just tell them it's none of their business. Besides, you're an American citizen." He was so right. From that time on I just told everybody I was an American citizen. But he was very concerned about the Japanese Americans that worked at the studio.

From 1943 to 1951, she worked for the pharmaceutical advertising agency William Douglas McAdams.

In 1951, Fujikawa became a full-time freelancer, producing more than 80 front-cover illustrations for Children's Digest and other periodicals, and about five years later was approached by juvenile editor Debra Dorfman at Grosset & Dunlap to illustrate Robert Louis Stevenson's "A Child's Garden of Verses". This was her first published children's book, in 1957. Babies, the first book both written and illustrated by Fujikawa in 1963, was also one of the earliest children's books to use multiracial characters, a consistent feature across her body of work.

After the success of A Child's Garden of Verses, Fujikawa became one of the first artists to contract for royalty payments, refusing to perform work unless her publisher agreed to pay her royalties.

Fujikawa's books have been reprinted for mass-market and published worldwide. Her most popular books, Babies, Baby Animals, A to Z Picture Book and Oh!, What A Busy Day!, represent a happy, detailed version of childhood. Her paintings of children are recognizable for round happy faces, rosy cheeks and simple dot eyes. Discussing her respect for her audience, she said:

In illustrating for children, what I relish most is trying to satisfy the constant question in the back of my mind--will this picture capture a child's imagination? What can I do to enhance it further? Does it help to tell a story? I am far from being successful (whatever that means), but I am ever so grateful to small readers who find 'something' in any book of mine.

Fujikawa died on November 26, 1998, in New York Hospital. Although she was engaged at 19, she never married.

== Other work ==
Fujikawa's notable commercial clients included Upjohn Company vitamins, Beech-Nut baby food and Eskimo Pie, creating the round-faced child icon for the ice cream treat. She created six stamps for the United States Post Office, including the 1997 32¢ "yellow rose" self-adhesive stamp and the United States-Japan Treaty ratification centenary stamp of 1960. Fujikawa was a life member of the Society of Illustrators.

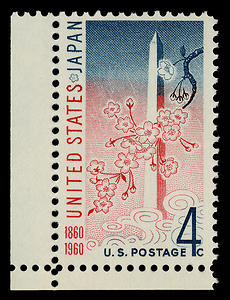
United States-Japan Treaty centenary stamp

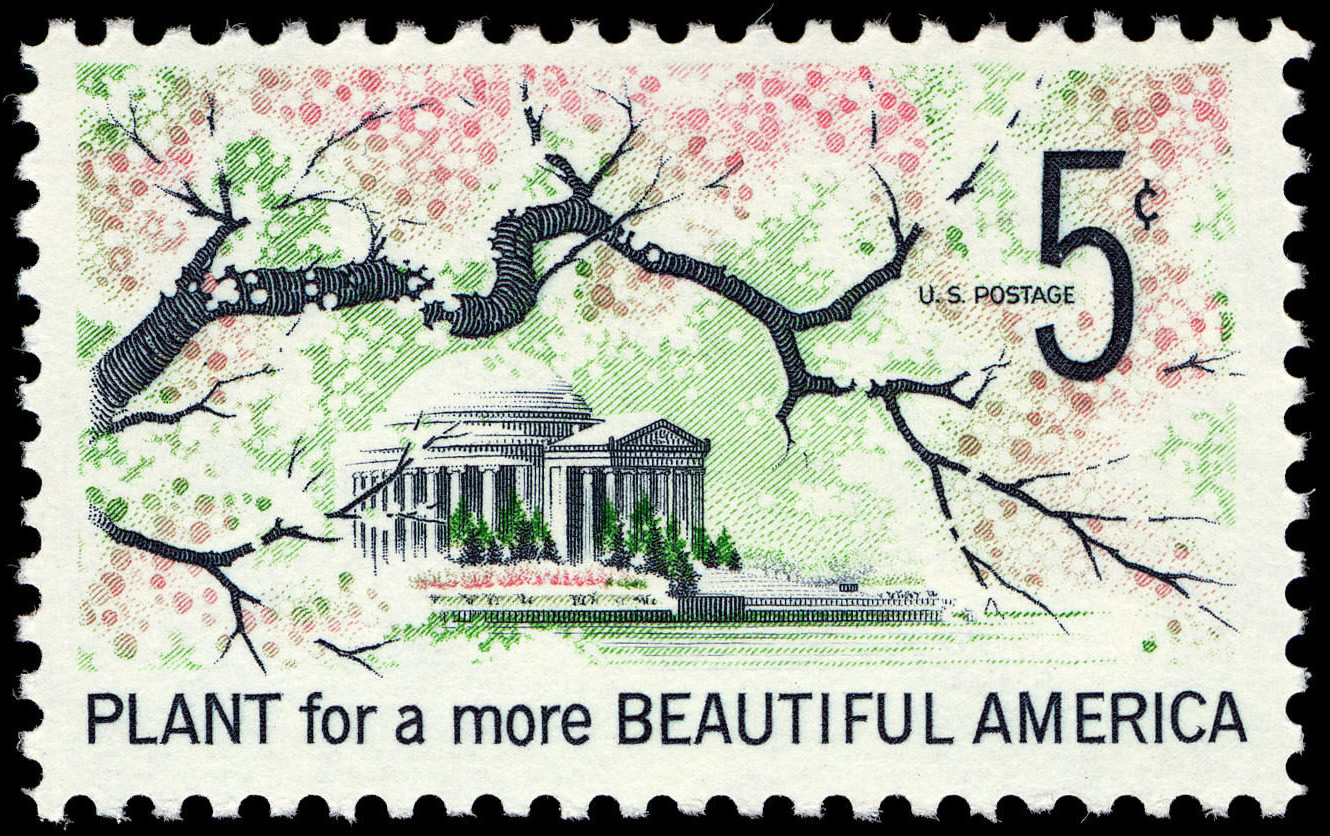
Plant for a More Beautiful America Cherry Blossom stamp

== In popular culture ==
Playwright Lloyd Suh scripted a one-act play imagining a dialogue between Walt Disney and Fujikawa titled Disney and Fujikawa. It was performed at the Ensemble Studio Theatre in New York City in 2017 and was reviewed by the New York Times.

In 2019 Penguin Random House published a book written by Kyo Maclear and illustrated by Julie Morstad about Fujikawa called It Began With a Page. This book was one of New York Public Library's Best Books for Kids 2019, the Globe and Mail's 100 Books That Shaped 2019, the Chicago Public Library's Chicago Best of the Best Books of 2019 under Best Informational Books for Younger Readers and one of Kirkus Reviews' Best of 2019 Picture Books (Biography). It was also featured on Today's "24 beautiful kids' books that reflect the Asian American experience.”

== Bibliography ==
=== Written and illustrated by Gyo Fujikawa ===
- Babies, 1963
- Baby Animals, 1963
- A to Z Picture Book, 1974
- Let's Eat, 1975
- Let's Play, 1975
- Puppies, Pussycats, and Other Friends, 1975
- Sleepy Time, 1975
- Oh, What a Busy Day!, 1976
- Babies of the Wild, 1977
- Betty Bear's Birthday, 1977
- Can You Count? New York, 1977
- Our Best Friends, 1977
- Millie's Secret, 1978
- Let's Grow A Garden, 1978
- My Favorite Thing, 1978
- Surprise! Surprise!, 1978
- Come Follow Me to the Secret World of Elves and Fairies and Gnomes and Trolls, 1979
- Jenny Learns A Lesson, 1980
- Welcome Is a Wonderful Word, 1980
- Come Out and Play, 1981
- Dreamland, 1981
- Fairyland, 1981
- Faraway Friends, 1981
- The Flyaway Kite, 1981
- Good Morning!, 1981
- Here I Am, 1981
- Jenny and Jupie, 1981
- The Magic Show, 1981
- Make-Believe, 1981
- My Animal Friends, 1981
- One, Two, Three, A Counting Book, 1981
- Shags Has a Dream, 1981
- Mother Goose, 1981
- A Tiny Word Book, 1981
- Year In, Year Out, 1981
- Jenny and Jupie to the Rescue, 1982
- Fraidy Cat, 1982
- Me Too! New York, 1982
- Sam's All-Wrong Day, 1982
- Shags Finds a Kitten, 1983
- That's Not Fair, 1983
- Are You My Friend Today?, 1988
- Sunny Books: Four Favorite Tales, 1989
- Ten Little Babies, 1989
- See What I Can Be!, 1990
- Good Night, Sleep Tight, Shh, 1990
- Be Careful, Brian and Other Tales, 1996

=== Illustrated by Gyo Fujikawa ===
- I Like Automobiles, 1931, by Dorothy Walter Baruch
- A Child's Garden of Verses, 1957, by Robert Louis Stevenson
- The Night Before Christmas, 1961, by Clement C. Moore
- Mother Goose, 1968
- A Child's Book of Poems, 1969
- Fairy Tales and Fables, 1970
- Poems for Children, 1980
- Baby Mother Goose, 1989
- Poems for Small Friends, 1989
