= Whitney Gardner =

Author and illustrator

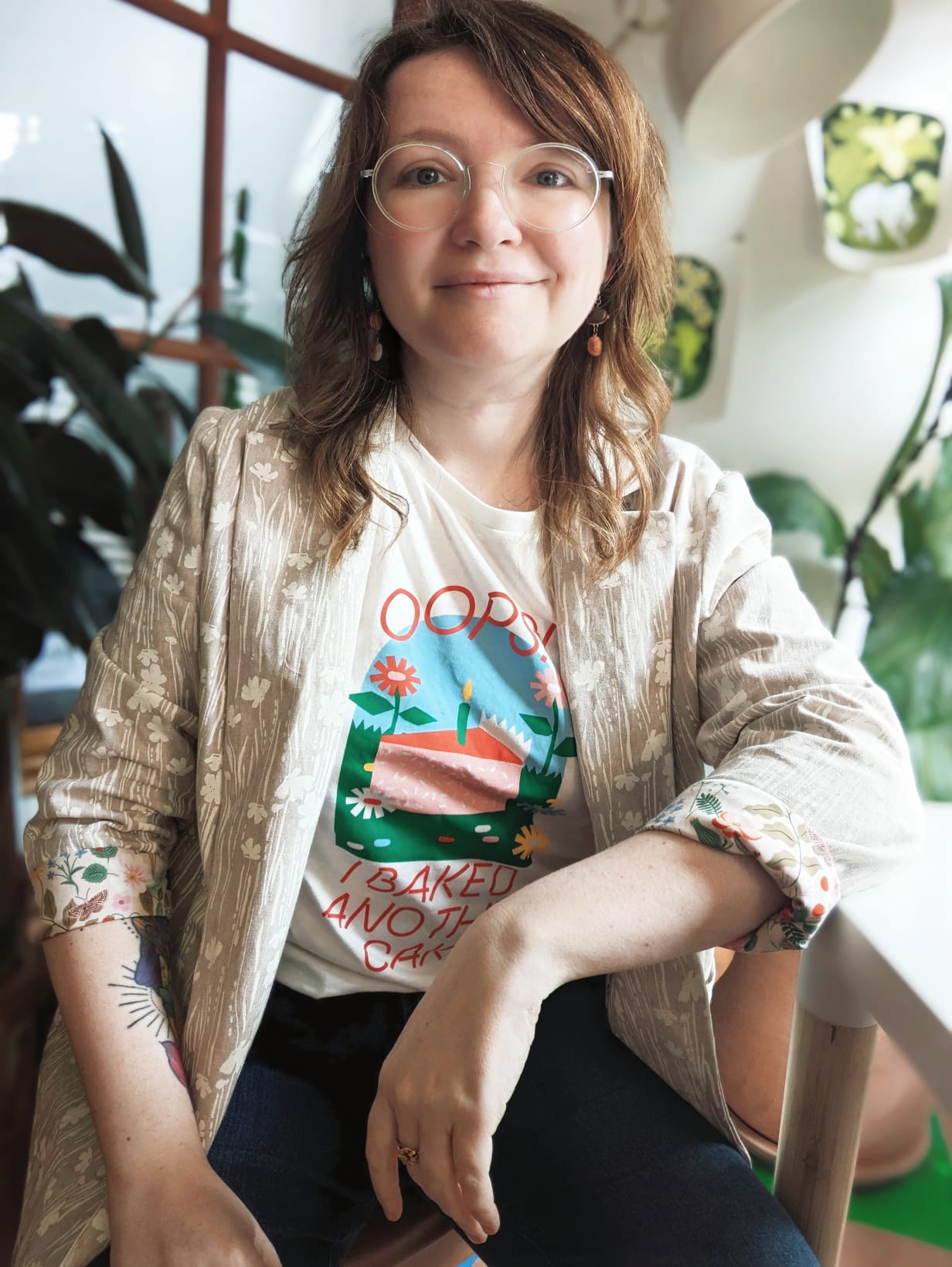
- Occupations: Author, illustrator

Whitney Gardner is an author and illustrator from Victoria, British Columbia. Her young adult novel You're Welcome Universe, which has an Indian, Deaf protagonist, was the winner of the 2018 Schneider Family Book Award. Her novel Chaotic Good was nominated for a 2019 White Pine Award. Gardner is represented by Charlie Olsen of Inkwell Management. Her first graphic novel Fake Blood received a starred review from Kirkus Reviews and was called "a dazzling debut".

== Personal life ==
Gardner grew up in New York. She has a BFA from SUNY Purchase in graphic design and worked as an art teacher and school librarian in the Bronx before moving to Portland, Oregon and then settling in Canada. She is married and she and her husband have two pugs named Gouda and Fig. She plays ukulele.

== Bibliography ==
- You're Welcome, Universe (2017)
- Chaotic Good (2018)
- Fake Blood (2018)
- Becoming RBG (Illustrations by) (2019)
- Long Distance (2021)
- The Racc Pack (Art by) (2024)
- The Racc Pack #2: Prince and the Pawper (Art by) (2025)
- Free Piano (Not Haunted) (2025)
- The Racc Pack #3: The Bins Breakout (Art by) (2026)
