= Sara O'Leary =

Canadian writer

- Born: Saskatoon, Saskatchewan, Canada
- Education: Concordia University (MA); University of British Columbia (MFA)
- Notable awards: Vicky Metcalf Award for Literature for Young People (2024)

Website
- saraoleary.ca

Sara O'Leary is a Canadian writer, who has published novels, children's books, plays, and reviews.

== Early life and education ==
O'Leary was born in Saskatoon. She earned a Master of Arts in English and creative writing from Concordia University and a Master of Fine Arts with a specialization in screenwriting from the program in Theatre, Film and Creative Writing at the University of British Columbia.

== Career ==
O'Leary has published several books, including adult novels and children's picture books. She has also published plays and reviews. Her picture book This is Sadie was adapted for the stage by Barbara Zinn Krieger for New York City Children's Theater. The production, directed and choreographed by Stephanie Klemons, was deemed "beguiling" by the New York Times.

O'Leary has received multiple honours for her picture books. Two of her books have been finalists for the Ruth & Sylvia Schwartz Children's Book Award for Children's Picture Book: A Family is a Family is a Family (2017) and A Kid Is A Kid Is A Kid (2022). In 2021, she won the Crystal Kite Award for Canada with Night Walk, illustrated by Ellie Arscott. In 2024, she received the Vicky Metcalf Award for Literature for Young People for her body of work, as well as the Alice Kitts Memorial Award for Excellence in Picture Book Writing for The Little Books of the Little Brontës.

A collection of postcard stories titled Wish You Were Here was published by Exile Editions (1994) and followed up by a collection of short fiction titled Comfort Me With Apples (Thistledown, 1998). O'Leary then went on to become a weekly literary columnist for both the Vancouver Sun and CBC Radio One.

Her fiction has appeared in publications such as Mslexia, Hobart and The Walrus, and her reviews appear in The Globe and Mail and the National Post. She is currently at work on a story collection titled The Art of Losing. On July 7, 2020, O'Leary published a novel entitled The Ghost in the House.

O'Leary's plays have been performed at numerous Fringe festivals and an early play, "The Dysfunctional Documentary," was nominated for a Sterling Drama Prize. Her play, "The Kitchen Sink," took first prize in Theatre BC's National Playwriting Competition for 2003 and was subsequently produced by Frank Moher at Western Edge Theatre.

As of 2026, she teaches at Concordia University.

== Publications ==
=== Children's books ===
- When You Were Small, illustrated by Julie Morstad (Simply Read Books, 2006)
- Where You Came From, illustrated by Julie Morstad (Simply Read Books, 2008)
- When I Was Small, illustrated by Julie Morstad (Simply Read Books, 2011)
- This Is Sadie, illustrated by Julie Morstad (Tundra Books, 2015)
- You Are Three, illustrated by Karen Klassen (Owl Kids, 2017)
- You Are One, illustrated by Karen Klassen (Owl Kids, 2019)
- You Are Two, illustrated by Karen Klassen (Owl Kids, 2019)
- A Family Is a Family Is a Family, illustrated by Qin Leng (Groundwood Books, 2016)
- The Boy and the Blue Moon, illustrated by Ashley Crowley (Godwin Books, Henry Holt, 2018)
- Owls Are Good at Keeping Secrets, illustrated by Jacob Grant (Tundra Books, 2018)
- Maud and Grand-Maud, illustrated by Kenard Pak (Tundra Books, 2020)
- Night Walk, illustrated by Ellie Arscott (Groundwood Books, 2020)
- Percy's Museum, illustrated by Carmen Mok (Groundwood Books, 2021)
- This Is Ruby, illustrated by Alea Marley (Tundra Books, 2021)
- A Kid Is a Kid Is a Kid, illustrated by Qin Leng (Groundwood Books, 2021)
- Gemma and the Giant Girl, illustrated by Marie Lafrance (Tundra Books, 2021)
- The Little Books of the Little Brontës, illustrated by Briony May Smith (Tundra Books, 2023)

=== Adult fiction ===
- The Ghost in the House (Doubleday Canada, 2020)
