= Ian McAllister (conservationist) =

Canadian film director

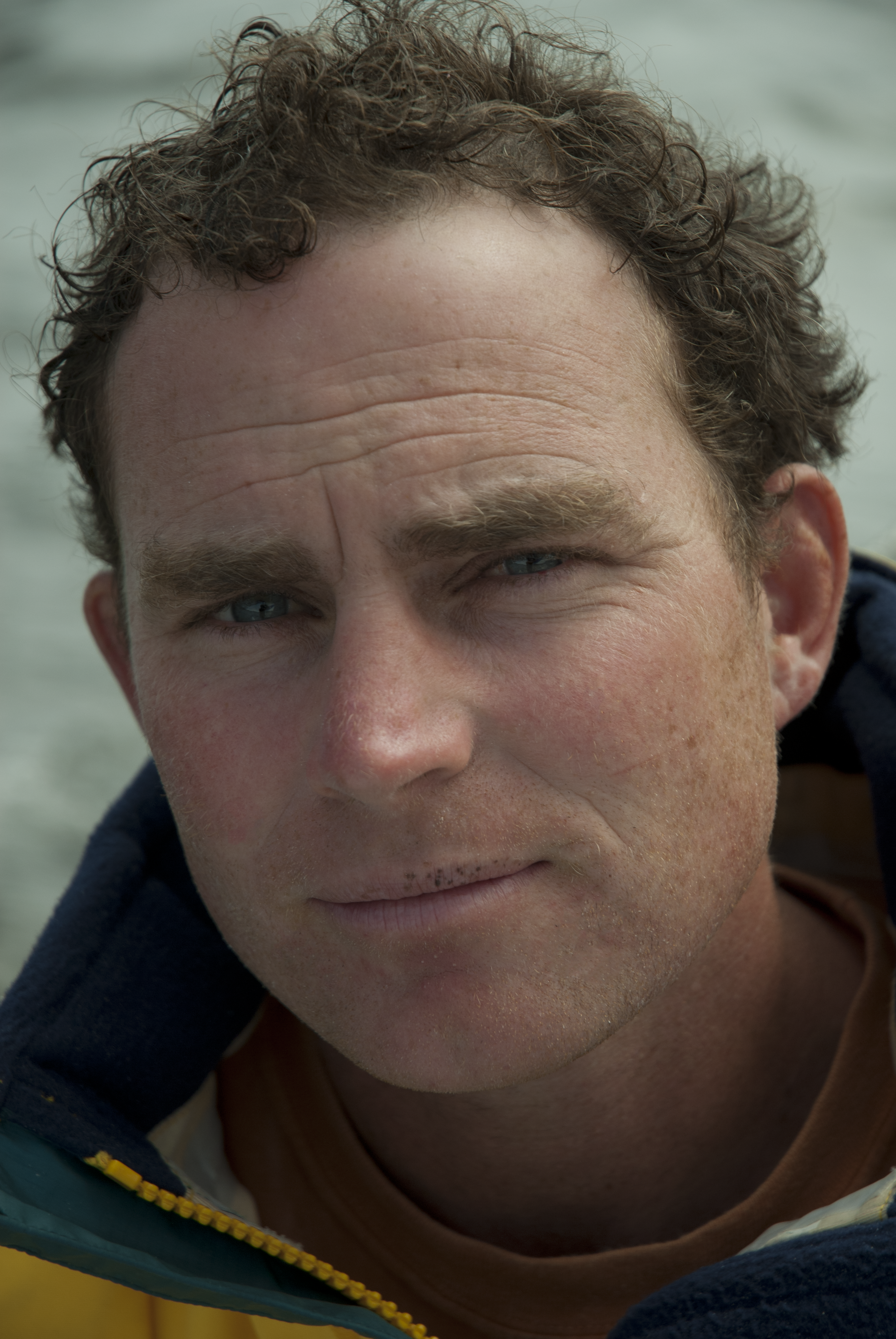
- Ian McAllister in December 2019
- Born: Ian McAllister; April 11, 1969 (age 57); West Vancouver, British Columbia, Canada
- Education: University of Victoria
- Occupations: Wildlife conservationist, film director, photographer
- Spouse: Karen McAllister

Ian Thomas McAllister (born 11 April 1969) is a Canadian wildlife conservationist, film director and nature photographer. McAllister is a co-founder of Pacific Wild. He is the author and co-author of 15 books, and has directed many films.

== Early life and education ==
McAllister was born in West Vancouver in 1969, one of five children of Peter and Jane McAllister. He attended Shawnigan Lake School, on Vancouver Island and took Southeast Asian studies at the University of Victoria.

== Career ==
In 1991 Ian co-founded the organization Raincoast Conservation Society. After visiting the Great Bear Rainforest in about 1994, he began studying and photographing the area. In 1997 he published a book, The Great Bear Rainforest: Canada's Forgotten Coast, with his wife Karen and Cameron Young; the next year he and his wife were named by Time magazine as an "Environmental leaders of the 21st Century".

In 2007 the McAllisters founded the Canadian wildlife conservation organization Pacific Wild, which works to bring awareness to conservation issues in the Great Bear Rainforest through visual storytelling, education and engagement whilst advocating for wildlife and their habitat.

In 2016 McAllister presented a talk, "Conservation in Canada's Great Bear Rainforest" at the TEDxBrentwoodCollegeSchool event.

McAllister's film Great Bear Rainforest: Land of the Spirit Bear, shot for IMAX and Giant Screen theatres, was released internationally in 2019.

Ian McAllister resigned as executive director of Pacific Wild on Aug. 16, 2021. The 'Narwhal' reports his statement of resignation as, "It's time for me to step away for personal and professional reasons and for a new executive director to take the organization forward."

McAllister is a Fellow of the International League of Conservation Photographers and the Royal Canadian Geographical Society.

His images have been featured on the front cover of National Geographic Magazine and he is currently directing development of two new IMAX films. His images are represented by National Geographic Image Collection.

== Awards ==
In 2000, McAllister received the Rainforest Action Network's Rainforest Hero Award. In 2010 he was the recipient of the North American Nature Photography Association's Vision Award.

In 2019, McAllister was given and award for Best Cinematography by the Giant Screen Cinema Association, as well as an award for Best Engaging Youth Film by Jackson Wild Media.

== Publications ==
- The Great Bear Rainforest: Canada's Forgotten Coast, by Ian McAllister and Karen McAllister with Cameron Young. Harbour Publishing 1997
- The Last Wild Wolves: Ghosts of the Great Bear Rainforest, by Ian McAllister, with introduction by Paul C. Paquet and contributions from Chris Darimont. Greystone Books, Douglas & McIntyre Publishers, 2007
- The Salmon Bears: Giants of the Great Bear Rainforest, by Ian McAllister and Nicholas Read. Orca Book Publishers, 2010
- The Sea Wolves: Living Wild in the Great Bear Rainforest, by Ian McAllister and Nicholas Read. Orca Book Publishers, 2010
- Following the Last Wild Wolves, by Ian McAllister, with introduction by Paul Paquet and contributions from Chris Darimont. Douglas & McIntyre Publishers, 2011
- The Great Bear Sea: Exploring the Marine Life of a Pacific Paradise, by Ian McAllister and Nicholas Read. Orca Book Publishers, 2013
- Great Bear Wild: Dispatches from a Northern Rainforest, by Ian McAllister, introduction by Robert F. Kennedy Jr. Greystone Books, 2014
- The Wild in You: Voices from the Forest and the Sea. Poems by Lorna Crozier with images by Ian McAllister. Greystone Books, 2015
- Wolf Island, by Ian McAllister and Nicholas Read. Orca Book Publishers, March 2017
- A Bear's Life, by Ian McAllister and Nicholas Read. Orca Book Publishers,
- The Seal Garden, by Ian McAllister and Nicholas Read. Orca Book Publishers, March 2018.
- A Whale's World, Ian McAllister and Nicolas Read. Orca Book Publishers, August 2018.
- Great Bear Rainforest: A Giant Screen Adventure in the Land of the Spirit Bear, by Ian McAllister and Alex Van Tol. Orca Book Publishers, February 2019.
- Babies of the Great Bear Rainforest, by Ian McAllister. Orca Book Publishers, February 2019

== See also ==
- Conservation biology
- Environmentalism
- Bear conservation
