= Roy Henry Vickers =

Canadian First Nations artist

Roy Henry Vickers, CM OBC (born June 1946 in Laxgalts'ap (formerly known as Greenville), British Columbia) is a Canadian First Nations artist. He owns and operates a gallery in Tofino, British Columbia.

== Biography ==
Vickers was born on the Nass River but raised in Kitkatla, Hazelton, British Columbia, and Victoria, B.C. His father was a fisherman who was matrilineally Tsimshian, also with Haida and Heiltsuk ancestry. His mother was a schoolteacher whose parents had emigrated from England and who was in the 1940s adopted into the Eagle clan at Kitkatla, B.C. (making Roy also Eagle). His grandfather was a Kitkatla canoe-carver. The paintings and works that he has created reflect this mixed heritage as his work has many elements of the traditional art of the First Nations peoples of the Pacific Northwest, but remains distinctive.

Vickers became interested in Northwest Coast art partly under the influence of the anthropologist Wilson Duff.

His work has been the official gift of the province of British Columbia to visiting foreign leaders several times. In 1987 the original of his painting A Meeting of Chiefs was the official gift to Queen Elizabeth II and in 1993 artist's proofs of his print The Homecoming were the Province's gift to Bill Clinton and Boris Yeltsin. He designed the Tsimshian Northwest Indian Heritage Dollar issued in 1978.

Vickers has been the artistic advisor to several events in British Columbia. In 1994 he was the artistic advisor to the architects and designers of the 1994 Commonwealth Games. For the Games Vickers also created more than 20 totem poles. Also, from 1987 to 1995, Vickers was the artistic advisor for the Vancouver International Airport's new terminal. Some of his work is prominently displayed there for travellers to admire.

Once a substance abuser, in 1992 he created VisionQuest, a non-profit organization designed to help individuals with addictive personalities.

== Publications ==
Vickers has published several books which are collections of his art, and has illustrated many other works. Among these publications are:

- Vickers, Roy Henry (1977). Beginnings: An exhibition of the silkscreen prints and carvings of Roy Henry Vickers. University of British Columbia.
- Vickers, Roy Henry (1988). Solstice: The art of Roy Henry Vickers. Eagle Dancer Enterprises & Raincoast Books. ISBN 0-9693485-1-7.
- Bouchard, Dave (1990). The Elders Are Watching. Eagle Dancer Enterprises & Raincoast Books. ISBN 1-55192-641-5.
- Vickers, Roy Henry (1996). Spirit Transformed: A Journey from Tree to Totem. Raincoast Books. ISBN 1-55192-015-8.
- Vickers, Roy Henry (2003). Copperman: The Art of Roy Henry Vickers. Eagle Dancer Enterprises.

He has also collaborated with Lucky Budd on several children's picture books.

== Awards ==
In 1998 Vickers received the Order of British Columbia. In 2006, he was made a Member of the Order of Canada.

In 2019, Vickers was nominated for a Grammy Award for his design for a Grateful Dead box set.

== Bibliography ==
- Jensen, Doreen, and Polly Sargent (1986) Robes of Power: Totem Poles on Cloth. Vancouver: University of British Columbia Press.
