= Nikki Tate =

Canadian writer

Nikki Tate-Stratton
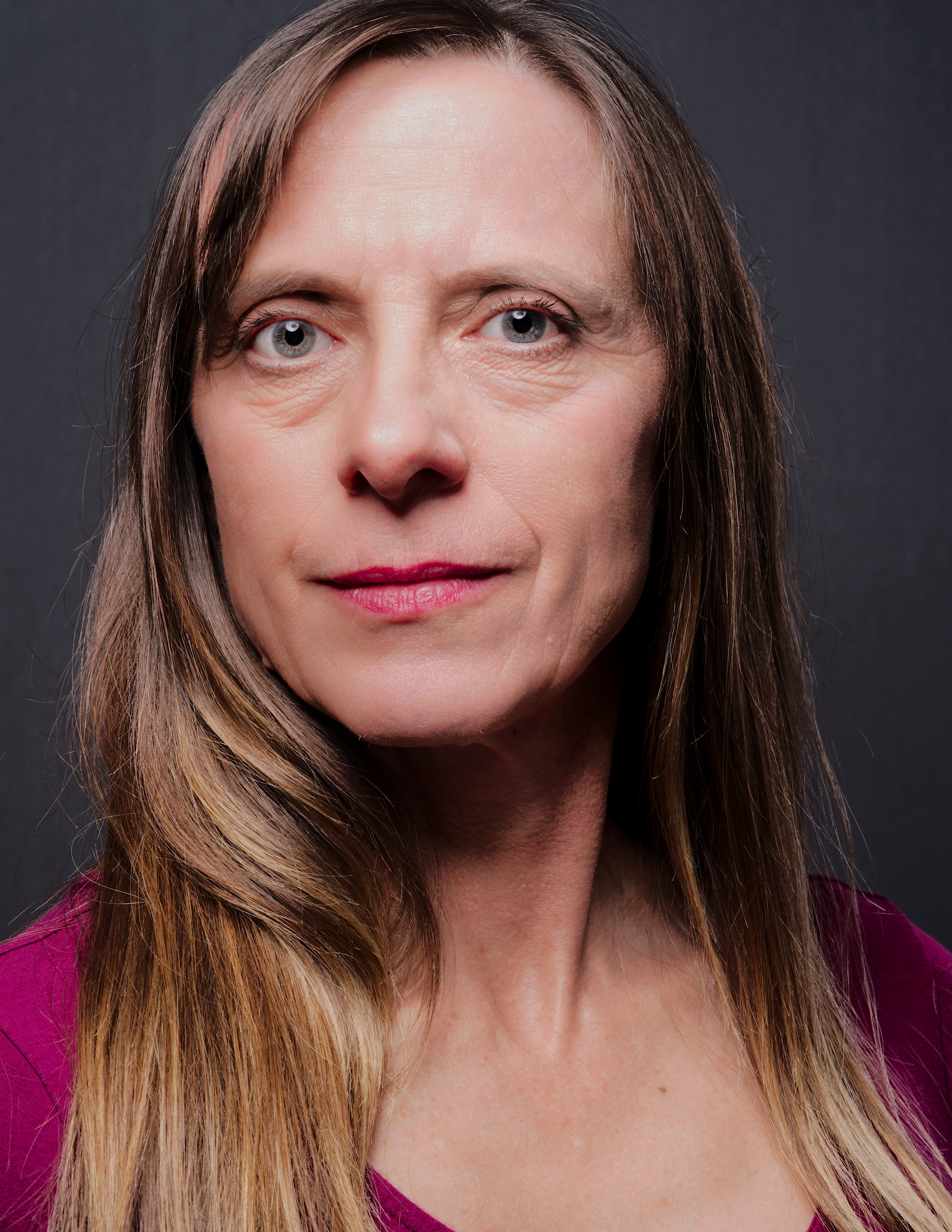
- Occupation: Author
- Writing career
- Pen name: Nikki Tate
- Genres: Children's Literature, Non-fiction, ESL Education

Nikki Tate is the pseudonym used by Canadian author, Nicole Tate-Stratton. She lives in Canmore, Alberta and is the founder of creative space Nexus Generation, the home of Writers on Fire, an online writing community where she mentors and supports members in developing their writing skills and how to share their stories and poems on a variety of platforms.

Tate participates in the outdoor activities, including horse riding, rock climbing, cross-country skiing and hiking.

== Writing ==
Tate is the author of more than 30 books, as well as hundreds of articles, blog posts, media releases and corporate documents.

Her children's books include the Tarragon Island novels (Sono Nis Press), the StableMates series (Sono Nis Press), the Estorian Chronicles fantasy series (Sono Nis Press), Jo's Triumph (Orca, 2002) and Jo's Journey (Orca, 2006). She also released a picture book, Grandparents' Day (Annick Press, 2004), based on a true story about her grandmother, Margareta Wallraf.

Tate has written a number of non-fiction titles with equestrian themes. Double Take: Karen Brain's Olympic Journey (Sono Nis Press, 2008) is a biography of Paralympian Karen Brain. The Racehorse was written as part of the Behind the Scenes series (Fitzhenry and Whiteside, 2007).

Tate has contributed as an author to the Orca Footprints series, including Deep Roots: How Trees Sustain Our Planet (published by Orca in 2015), which received several award nominations and was named by the New York Public Library as one of 2016's Best 100 Books for Kids. Kirkus Reviews noted the book was "A solid foundation, a taproot to appreciating the incredible diversity and contribution of trees to our everyday lives." and School Library Journal called it "...ideal for budding researchers unfamiliar with environmental issues..." Her most recent Orca Footprints contribution, If a Tree Falls: The Global Impact of Deforestation, was published on October 13, 2020 and looks at forest practices throughout history, the growth of industry and the fight for preservation.

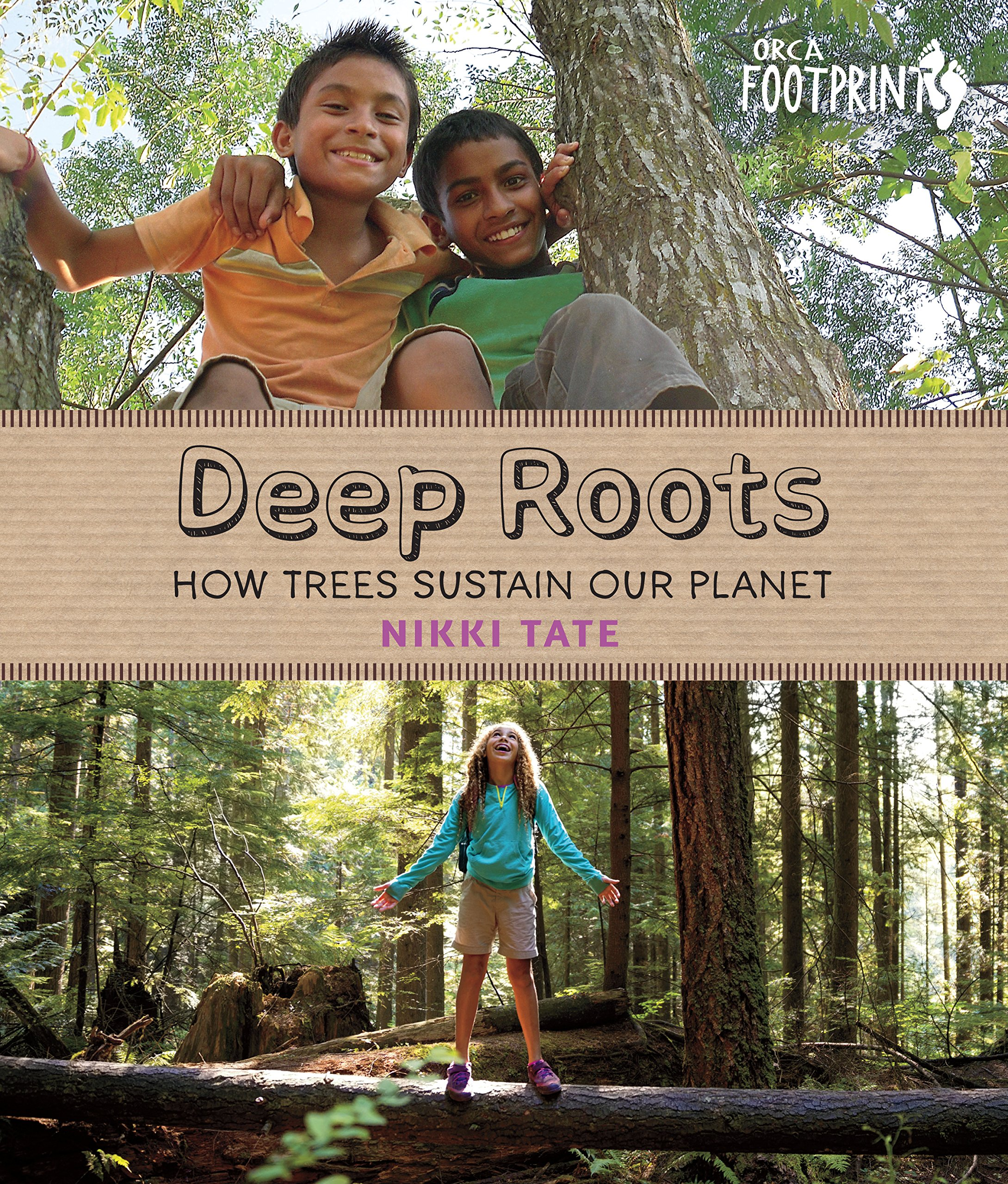
Deep Roots: How Trees Sustain Our Planet by Nikki Tate (Orca, 2016)

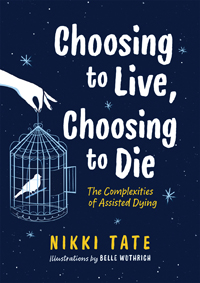
Choosing to Live, Choosing to Die by Nikki Tate (Orca, 2019)

As part of the Orca Issues series, Tate released Choosing to Live, Choosing to Die in 2019. The book "objectively explores the intertwined medical, political, religious, and ethical concerns surrounding end-of-life decisions", and pulls from Tate's own personal struggle with her mother's dementia and the inability to fulfil her end of life wishes. Quill and Quire praised the book as "An important work that fills a void, Choosing to Live, Choosing to Die honestly addresses one of the hardest realities of growing up: “life and death are rarely as straightforward as we’d wish.”" Kirkus Reviews called it a "A thought-provoking, easy-to-understand resource".

In March 2020, Home Base: A Mother-Daughter Story was published through Holiday House, with Tate writing the story and illustrations by Katie Kath. The picture book received starred reviews from Kirkus Reviews and Publishers Weekly, with Kirkus calling it "A celebration of female perseverance and success: brava!" and Publishers Weekly praising how the book "...unobtrusively featuring women in nontraditional roles empowers, as does its message of teamwork and support.”

=== List of Published Works - Series ===
Orca Footprints (Orca):

- Down To Earth: How Kids Help Feed the World (2013)
- Take Shelter: At Home Around the World (2014)
- Deep Roots: How Trees Sustain Our Planet (2015)
- Better Together: Creating Community in an Uncertain World (2018)
- If a Tree Falls: The Global Impact of Deforestation (2020)

Orca Issues (Orca):

- Choosing to Live, Choosing to Die: Exploring Medical Assistance in Dying (2019)

Orca Soundings (Orca):

- Fallout (2011)

Orca Origins (Orca):

- Birthdays: Beyond Cake and Ice Cream (with Dani Tate-Stratton) (2017)
- Christmas: From Solstice to Santa (2018)

Orca Sports (Orca):

- Razor's Edge (2009)
- Venom (2009)
- Deadpoint (2017)

Orca Young Readers (Orca):

- Jo's Triumph (2002)
- Jo's Journey (2006)

Estorian Chronicles (Sono Nis Press)

- Cave of Departure (2001)
- The Battle for Carnillo (2003)

Stablemates Series (Sono Nis Press):

- Rebel of Dark Creek (1997)
- Team Trouble at Dark Creek (1997)
- Jessa be Nimble, Rebel be Quick (1998)
- Sienna's Rescue (1998)
- Raven's Revenge (1999)
- Return to Skoki Lake (1999)
- Keeping Secrets at Dark Creek (2002)

Tarragon Island Series (Sono Nis Press):

- Tarragon Island (1999)
- No Cafes in Narnia (2000)
- Trouble on Tarragon Island (2005)

=== List of Published Works - Individual ===
- Home Base: A Mother-Daughter Story (Illustrated by Katie Kath) (Holiday House, 2020)
- Cliffhanger: Climbing in the Canadian Rockies (Pearson, 2017)
- Myths of the Sea (Scylla and Charybdis) (Pearson, 2016)
- Madison's Flood of Troubles (Stabenfeldt, 2011)
- Money Matters (Pearson, 2015)
- Double Take: Karen Brain's Olympic Journey (Sono Nis Press, 2008)
- Behind the Scenes - Racehorse (F&W, 2007)
- Grandparents' Day (Illustrated by Benoit Laverdiere) (Annick-Firefly, 2004)
- The American Life (Tahaus Publishing, Tokyo, 1990)
