= The Kids Book of Aboriginal Peoples in Canada =

Children's book by Diane Silvey

The Kids Book of Aboriginal Peoples in Canada is a book written by Diane Silvey and illustrated by John Mantha, about Canada's First Nations. The book discusses how the Natives were influenced by the contact with European settlers, and how they formed the League of Six Nations, and how residential schools were set up in the 1800s for Aboriginals. It was first published in 2005. It is published by Kids Can Press.

== Chapters ==
- Introduction
- Peoples of the NW Coast
- Peoples of the Plateau
- Peoples of the Subarctic
- Peoples of the Plains
- Peoples of the Arctic
- Iroquonians of the E Woodlands
- Algonquians of the E Woodlands
- Aboriginal Peoples after Contact
- Index
