= It Began with a Page =

2019 picture book by Kyo Maclear, illustrated by Julie Morstad

It Began with a Page: How Gyo Fujikawa Drew the Way
- Author: Kyo Maclear
- Illustrator: Julie Morstad
- Language: English
- Genre: Picture book; Biography
- Publisher: Harper, an imprint of HarperCollins
- Publication date: October 8, 2019
- Publication place: Canada/United States
- Pages: 48
- ISBN: 978-0-06-244762-3

It Began with a Page: How Gyo Fujikawa Drew the Way is a children's picture book about the life and works of American illustrator and writer Gyo Fujikawa. The book was written by Kyo Maclear and illustrated by Julie Morstad.

== Reception ==
It Began with a Page received a starred review from Publishers Weekly, Kirkus Reviews and School Library Journal. Kathy Piehl, who reviewed for the School Library Journal, noted how some of Julie Morstad's illustrations evoked Gyo Fujikawa's style of "elegance and simplicity". Kirkus Reviews praised Morstad's art, saying she "precisely balances white space with vignettes, black-and-white illustrations with eye-catching color." The reviewer also commented how the illustrations "resonance onto [Kyo Maclear]'s spare, poetic text." It concluded by calling it a "splendid" book.

Publishers Weekly's review praised the art and the writing of It Began with a Page, as well as how the "biography conveys with quiet power how recently segregation reached into every aspect of American life, and how one woman did her part to defeat it." Writing for The Horn Book, Katrina Hedeen commented on the different styles of art employed by Morstad, such as "in liquid watercolor, gouache, and pencil crayons", used to demark different points of Fujikawa's life. Hedeen also praised Maclear's writing, saying it "lucidly outlines a remarkable life of art and creativity, of struggle and perseverance."

The book was a Boston Globe-Horn Book Honor in the nonfiction category. One of the judges, during the presentation of the award, said: "In powerful poetic text and spare delicate color and black and white artwork, Kyo Maclear and Julie Morstad chronicle the many challenges faced by Fujikawa".
