= Lucky Budd =

Canadian author

- Born: Robert Budd
- Education: University of Victoria (BA, MA)
- Occupations: Author, historian, radio host
- Awards: BC Book Prize

Robert "Lucky" Budd is a Canadian author, oral historian, and radio host. He is known for his books based upon the stories of British Columbia pioneers, as well as his book collaborations with artist Roy Henry Vickers.

== Early life and education ==
Budd received the nickname "Lucky" from his brother soon after his birth, and the name became his preferred moniker. He moved to Victoria from Toronto in 1995 after earning a Bachelor of Arts degree in humanities from the University of Victoria and touring with a rock band. In 2000, Budd then became the audio preservationist for CBC during its campaign to digitize its audio archives, including Nisga'a First Nation heritage. In 2002 he again attended the University of Victoria, where he completed his Master of Arts degree in history. He was awarded the University Of Victoria’s 2020 Distinguished Alumni Of The Year for the Faculty Of Humanities.

== Career ==
Budd is the host of the CBC Radio series Voices of B.C., where he recounts the stories of B.C. pioneers from tapings of their voices that were recorded in the 1950s and '60s by journalist Imbert Orchard. Budd is also the author of its companion book Voices of British Columbia: Stories from our Frontier, published in 2010. That year the book was nominated for a BC Book Prize.

In 2014, he released a follow-up book entitled Echoes of British Columbia; both books were sold alongside a three-CD set of 26 original pioneer recordings. Echoes was the 2nd prize for The Lieutenant-Governor's Medal for Historical Writing 2014. Each of the projects are extensions of his master's thesis, which was done on the archive of pioneer recordings he discovered during his tenure as audio preservationist. Both books were national bestsellers.

Budd is also the author of Ted Harrison Collected and Project Manager for the book Storyteller: The Art Of Roy Henry Vickers.

In October 2017, Budd's son Levi produced a short video about the genesis of his word, Levidrome. Oxford Dictionary has indicated that they are considering it for inclusion into their dictionary.

=== Collaborations with Roy Henry Vickers ===
In 2013 Budd co-authored Raven Brings the Light with Roy Henry Vickers, who contributed 19 original art pieces to the book. The book became a national bestseller in Canada. They collaborated again in 2014 on the book Cloudwalker, in 2015 on the book Orca Chief, and in 2016 on the book Peace Dancer. Their first three books together were each short-listed for the Bill Duthie Booksellers' Choice Award at the BC Book Prizes, Orca Chief was also the winner of the Moonbeam Spirit Award for Preservation, and nominated for the Elizabeth Mrazik-Cleaver Award and Christie Harris Illustrated Children's Literature Prize, and all four books have also been national bestsellers and referred to as the Northwest Coast Legends Series. In 2017, Budd and Vickers collaborated on the words board book Hello Humpback!, a board book about landscapes and creatures of the Northwest Canada. Hello Humpback! was named as 2nd bestseller in British Columbia. Following on the success of Hello Humpback! In 2018 Vickers and Budd followed with One Eagle Soaring, the second volume in their series, First West Coast Books. It won a Moonbeam gold medal and was nominated for a BC book prize. In 2018, Budd made a comeback with his regular contributor Roy Henry Vickers with his new book Voices from Skeena; a story about Skeena, the river in British Columbia's northwest, which remains an icon of the province. Voices from Skeena includes interviews with eleven different people, including Indigenous people and very early settlers. It was nominated for the B.C. Book prize in 2018. In 2019, Budd wrote a board book, Sockeye Silver, Saltchuck Blue, which follows the shifting spectrum of the Pacific Northwest. It won the gold for Budd and Vickers at the 2019 Moonbeam Awards. Budd and Vickers followed with the book Raven Squawk, Orca Squeak in 2020. It was named as the #2 bestseller of 2020 in British Columbia. In 2021, Budd and Vickers published their 11th book, A Is for Anemone; it is about literacy and children's awareness of the natural world. A Is For Anemone is nominated for a BC Book Prize in the Bill Duthie category. Budd is also the Project Editor on the Roy Henry Vickers book Ben The Sea Lion, to be released on 30 April 2022.

=== Race with Me ===
In 2021, Budd collaborated with Olympian Medalist Andre De Grasse and Illustrator Joseph Osei Bonsu on the book Race with Me! Race with Me! has been nominated for the 2022 Silver Birch Express Award and 2022 Shining Willow Award .
