= Birdsong (picture book) =

2019 children's picture book by Julie Flett

- Illustrated edition cover
- Author: Julie Flett
- Illustrator: Julie Flett
- Language: English
- Genre: Children's fiction
- Publisher: Greystone Kids
- Publication date: 24 September 2019
- Publication place: Canada
- Media type: Print (hardback)
- Pages: 48
- ISBN: 9781771644730
- OCLC: 1141813698

Birdsong is a 2019 children's picture book written and illustrated by Julie Flett. The book follows the story of a young indigenous girl named Katherena, who moves to a countryside home with her mother. Lonely in her new home at first, Katherena develops a friendship with her elderly neighbor, Agnes. The book explores the intergenerational relationship between them. The pages were illustrated with pastel and pencil colours.

Greystone Kids published the book on 24 September 2019. The book received positive reviews by critics, who praised its seasonal arrangement, portrayal of relationships, and minimalist illustrations. It appeared on numerous year-end "best of" publication lists, including those of The Horn Book Magazine, Kirkus Reviews, and Publishers Weekly. In 2020, the book was awarded the TD Canadian Children's Literature Award and the American Indian Youth Literature Award.

== Plot ==
The book opens in spring, when a young indigenous girl named Katherena and her mother leave their home by the sea and move into a countryside residence. Katherena has difficulty adjusting to her new home and no longer enjoys drawing at her new desk. Seeing her loneliness, Katherena's mother asks her to visit their older neighbour Agnes, a clay artist. Katherena becomes friends with Agnes. Katherena shows her paintings to Agnes, who shows Katherena her garden and clay-shaped birds and animals. Katherena teaches Agnes Cree words while Agnes tells her about rural life. During the fall, Katherena helps Agnes in her garden by preparing the soil for next spring and feeding worms. By winter, Agnes cannot go outside her home. Katherena and her mother prepare salmon stew and take it to Agnes's home. With the passage of the seasons, Agnes becomes frail, yet the bond between Katherena and Agnes keeps growing. They continue to share their mutual love for flora, fauna, and art while their strengthening relationship allows Katherena to grow.

== Themes and illustrations ==
Birdsong touches upon the themes of intergenerational friendship, growth in human connections, passion for art, and seasonal cycles. The book is split into seasonal segments. The intergenerational relationship between Katherena and Agnes is portrayed using the cycle of seasons—spring, summer, fall, winter, spring. Professor Gregory Bryan of the University of Manitoba interpreted the seasonal passage of time as "the renewal of the cycle of life" and argued that the same was true for the changing connection between Katherena and Agnes. Bryan notes that the theme gives the impression that this cycle will continue with an aged Katherena yielding "her place [to] a younger person who has evolved and been endowed with wisdom gained through an acquaintance with Katherena".

The book makes use of digital compositions that employ pencils and pastel colours, and are prominently characterized by Flett's minimalist art style. Katherena is depicted as a girl with brown skin and straight, black hair. The pastoral scenery is shown using flat green spaces that change colours with each season and include delicate flowers and colourful birds, shown in silhouette. Katherena's paintings of birds have been illustrated to appear soft and fuzzy, while the snowy winter air is depicted with more haze. The book was described by critics as sparse and poetic. Cree words used throughout the book are explained within the contents of the book and in a glossary at the beginning.

== Reception ==
Reviewers praised the book for its seasonal arrangement, portrayal of relationships, and minimalist illustrations. Sujei Lugo of The Horn Book Magazine praised the book's "smooth and lyrical" writing and the illustrations for "portraying the emotional journey of Agnes and Katherena". Lugo felt that these show the affection of the protagonists and help encapsulate the practice of honouring elders. In an article published in The Bulletin of the Center for Children's Books, Kate Quealy-Gainer commended its artwork, which she described as "both flattened and textured with subdued tones that follow the changing seasons accordingly". Kirkus Reviews agreed and called the book "emotionally stunning".

Giving the book a three-out-of-five-stars score, Bryan acknowledged the "enticing illustrations [and] sweet lyrical prose", and the portrayal of intergenerational friendship. Publishers Weekly regarded the book as a "subtle, sensitive story" that describes themes of maturation and loss through art, time, and friendship. The publication particularly praised the glossary of Cree words which attached "an intimate layer of identity" to the story. Calling the book "simple and profound", Laken Hotten of School Library Journal notes the message that "a new friend can make a new place feel like home".

Several publications including The Horn Book Magazine, Kirkus Reviews, Publishers Weekly, and School Library Journal listed Birdsong as among the best picture books of 2019. The book was awarded the 2020 TD Canadian Children's Literature Award, and was named as one of the finalists for the Governor General's Literary Award. The book received an honour title at the 2020 American Indian Youth Literature Awards.
