= Greg Younging =

Canadian editor (1961–2019)

- Born: 18 March 1961
- Died: 3 May 2019; Penticton Regional Hospital
- Education: University of British Columbia, Carleton University, Simon Fraser University, Carleton University
- Occupations: Writer, university teacher, editor, ethnologist, anthropologist
- Employer: University of British Columbia Okanagan

Greg Younging (sometimes written Young-Ing; 18 March 1961 – 3 May 2019) was a Canadian editor and expert on First Nations copyright. He was a member of the Opaskwayak Cree Nation. He was the managing editor at Theytus books and published "Elements of Indigenous Style: A Guidebook for Writing By and About Indigenous Peoples" in 2018. Younging died on 3 May 2019 in Penticton, British Columbia.

== Personal life ==
Younging was born on 18 March 1961. He was a member of Opsakwayak Cree Nation in Northern Manitoba. His mother, Dr Rosalyn Ing, was a residential school survivor and her experience of abuse within the school influenced his decision to spend his career raising issues related to the impacts of colonization, and advocate for Indigenous knowledge.

== Education ==
Younging earned a Bachelor of Arts and Masters of Arts Degree from Carleton University. He has a Master of Publishing Degree, from Simon Fraser University. He received a PhD from the University of British Columbia, Department of Educational Studies.

Younging's parents met in the Canadian military and Younging subsequently spent his childhood moving between Canadian bases. Because his father received training in electrical engineering and was posted to the Canadian Forces Base Lahr, he spent his teen years in Germany.

== Career ==
Younging had a number of different roles during his career.

Younging was the Managing Editor of Theytus Books from 1990 to 2003, returning to the role in 2016 until his death in 2019.

Younging served as assistant director of Research for the Canadian federal government's Truth and Reconciliation Commission (TRC) of Canada. He has worked for a number of other organizations including: The Royal Commission On Aboriginal Peoples, Assembly of First Nations, Committee Of Inquiry into Indian Education, Native Women's Association of Canada. He was member of Aboriginal Arts Advisory Committee of the Canada Council (1997–2001) and the British Columbia Arts Council (1999–2001).

As a professor at the University of British Columbia Okanagan, Younging had a profound impact on the university. He was a professor and Coordinator of the Indigenous Studies Program at the Irving K. Barber School of Arts and Sciences at the University of British Columbia–Okanagan. Younging was "instrumental in the development of the Indigenous Studies program." at the university.

He published numerous works, including nonfiction and poetry.

== Awards ==
In June 2019, Younging was posthumously awarded the President's Award from the Association of Canadian Publishers for his contributions to the field.

== Selected publications ==
- Young-Ing, Greg; DeGagné, Mike; Dewar, Jonathan; Aboriginal Healing Foundation (Canada) (2011). Response, responsibility, and renewal: Canada's truth and reconciliation journey. Ottawa: Aboriginal Healing Foundation. ISBN 978-1-897285-72-5.
- Greg Younging, ed. (1989). "From the past, in the present, for the future": report of the National Aboriginal Youth Conference; February 10–13, 1989, Ottawa. Ottawa: DammIng Words Productions.
- Young-Ing, Greg (1998). Beyond victimization: forging a path to celebration. Penticton, BC: Theytus Books. ISBN 978-0-919441-84-2.
- Young-Ing, Greg (1999). Gatherings X: the En'owkin journal of first North American peoples. Pentiction, B.C.: Theytus Books. ISBN 978-0-919441-86-6.
- Young-Ing, Greg (1988). "A Comparison between Administration of First Nations Education in Canada and Peru: Divestments, Losses and Lacks". Canadian Journal of Native Education. 15 (3): 24–38.
- Young-Ing, Greg (1996). The random flow of blood and flowers. Victoria, B.C.: Ekstasis Editions. ISBN 978-1-896860-07-7.
- Younging, Gregory (2016). Water Anthology. ISBN 978-1-926886-40-4.
- Younging, Greg (2016). "The Traditional Knowledge -- Intellectual Property Interface". In Camille Callison; Loriene Roy; Gretchen Alice LeCheminant (eds.). Indigenous notions of ownership and libraries, archives and museums. ISBN 978-3-11-036299-2.
- Younging, Gregory (2018). Elements of Indigenous style: a guide for writing by and about Indigenous Peoples. ISBN 978-1-55059-716-5.
