= Qaunaq Mikkigak =

Canadian artist and author (1932–2020)

- Born: November 15, 1932; Nuvujuak, Nunavut, Canada
- Died: 2020 (aged 87–88); Cape Dorset, Nunavut
- Other names: Qaunak Mikkigak, Haunak Mikkigak
- Known for: Sculptor, jewelry maker, storyteller, throat singer

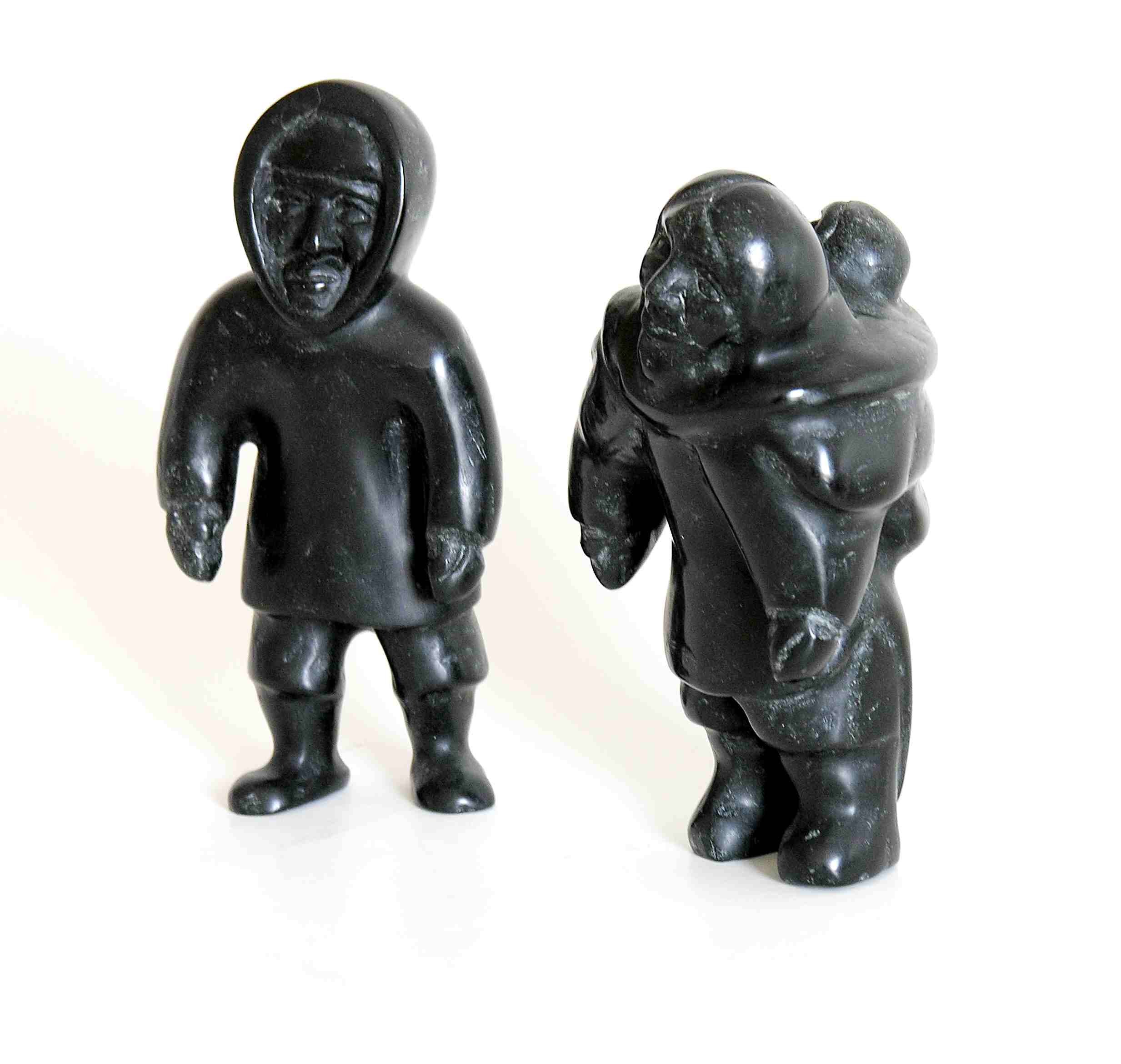
Man & Mother and Child carving by Qaunak Mikkigak.

Qaunaq Mikkigak (alternatively spelled Qaunak, Haunak) (November 15, 1932 – 2020) was a Canadian artist and author. She was known primarily for sculpting but also created jewelry, story telling, drawing and performed throat singing. As an artist she was interested in arts and crafts and built works that were inspired by her imagination and emotions. She co-authored the children's books The Legend of the Fog and Grandmother Ptarmigan based on traditional Inuit stories. She was featured in the book Inuit Women Artists: Voices from Cape Dorset for her artwork and in Cape Dorset Sculpture. She died in 2020.

== Early life ==
Qaunaq was the daughter of Mary Kudjuakjuk, a graphic artist. She lived her entire life in the area of and around Cape Dorset. When Qaunaq was a very young child (about three or four) she was temporarily adopted by a family in another camp (the reasons for this adoption are unknown). During this time she was mistreated and beaten by her adoptive parents. She found refuge with her eldest adopted brother and his wife, who would feed her when they were alone. After a visit from her father, she was returned to her family in the spring.

After being returned home, Qaunaq enjoyed learning the traditional Inuit ways of life from her mother. Mary couldn't move around a lot due to a heart condition and so Qaunaq did most of the work, such as collecting firewood, fetching water, preparing seal blubber, emptying the qurvik, cleaning the igloo floor, and chewing and sewing skins to make the family's clothing.

Her father died when she was about eight or ten years old and after his death, she began to make small carvings. Later her mother remarried a man named Quppapik and moved to Churchill, Manitoba for employment. Qaunaq remained behind to continue living in Nuvujuak.

== Artistic biography ==
Before her father's death, Qaunaq remembers watching him and the other men of Nuvujuak carving ivory and stone into small figures to sell to the Hudson's Bay Company. During this time she also began creating carvings of her own, but kept them hidden because only men were carving at the time. As such, she is considered one of the first Inuit women carvers. After her father's death she began to carve more openly. Qaunaq started with making soapstone heads for dolls, later creating qulliit and then geese. She made her carvings using an axe and file, never electric tools.

Qaunaq has created work in several mediums, including jewelry, drawing, and sewing. She is best known for her naturalistic sculptures and carving. The themes and imagery in her work include traditional folk tales, animals, angakuit (shamans), and other figures. Qaunaq stated,

"It feels very good when you're comfortable in feeling good about your carvings especially when other people like your carvings. Then you know you can do a carving each and every time you begin one."

Her work developed as she built as she did not depend on preconceived ideas. She began her sculpting practice with simple subjects and spare forms. These evolved in volume and complexity as she developed her artistic style. At times, she combined multiple subjects to create totemic or superimposed forms.

Qaunaq Mikkigak's work has been shown in many shows and galleries. Her prints were exhibited in the annual Cape Dorset print collections of 1980, 1981, and 1986. She was included in group shows such as Debut- Cape Dorset Jewelry (Canadian Guild of Crafts Quebec, Montreal 1976), Things That Make Us Beautiful/ Nos Parures (Department of Indian Affairs and Northern Development, Ottawa 1977–1978), and Northern Exposure: Inuit Images of Travel (Burnaby Art Gallery, British Columbia 1986). Her work is in public collections including the Art Gallery of Ontario, the Canadian Museum of Civilization, the Inuit Cultural Institute (Rankin Inlet), the Laurentian University Museum and Arts Centre in Sudbury, the National Gallery of Canada, the Prince of Wales Northern Heritage Centre in Yellowknife, and the Winnipeg Art Gallery. According to the Canadian Heritage Information Network, Qaunaq has over a thousand works listed. Some of her most notable works include Reaching for Fish (1987), Weird Creature (1988), and Selfish Hunter (1988).

== Music ==
Qaunaq Mikkigak also was known for her traditional Inuit throat singing which she performed throughout Canada and internationally.

== Literary work ==
Quanaq was an author as well as a sculptor. Her The Legend of the Fog is the story of a boy making his way across the tundra when he encounters a giant who wishes to eat him. In his escape from the giant, the boy releases the first fog into the world. Grandmother Ptarmigan explains why ptarmigans make the calls that they do and why young ptarmigans fly early in life. This is done through the scenario of a ptarmigan telling a bedtime story to her grandchildren. The Grandmother ptarmigan tries to get her little ptarmigan to go to bed but he refuses to go to sleep and demands a story instead. Finally, Grandmother gives in and tells him a story about the lemmings that want to come inside to get warm and burrow under his feathers. The little ptarmigan is getting more and more perturbed until Grandmother concludes the story with a bout of tickles. At this point the little ptarmigan is so frightened that he jumps up and flies away and Grandmother cries “nauk, nauk" in her sadness."

== Personal life ==
Qaunaq had a younger brother and ties to four formerly adoptive siblings. She was married to Inuk artist, Ohotaq (Oqutaq) Mikkigak, and they lived the traditional Inuit lifestyle in Nuvujuak together. She had eight children, one of her own and seven adoptive children. When Qaunaq's mother and stepfather returned to Cape Dorset for Quppapik, her stepfather, to become a custodian at the school, the Mikkigak family also moved into the settlement to enroll their two young children into the school. Later both she and her husband followed in Quppapik's footsteps and became employed as custodians. Both Qaunaq and her husband produced art work for their own enjoyment, and Qaunaq took pride in helping to support her family.
