= Kyo Maclear =

Canadian novelist and children's author (born 1970)

- Born: Kyo Iona Maclear; 1970 (age 55–56)
- Education: University of Toronto, B.A.; Ontario Institute for Studies in Education, M.A.; York University, PhD
- Writing career
- Notable works: Unearthing, Birds Art Life, Virginia Wolf, The Liszts, It Began with a Page
- Website: kyomaclear.com

Kyo Maclear (born 1970) is a Canadian novelist and children's author.

Maclear was born in London, England and moved to Toronto, Canada at a young age. Her father is journalist and documentary filmmaker Michael Maclear and her mother is Japanese artist and gallerist Yoko Maclear (nee Koide). She studied fine art and art history at the University of Toronto, completed a Master of Arts in cultural studies at the Ontario Institute for Studies in Education in 1996, and obtained a doctorate in environmental humanities and education at York University in 2018.

== Awards and honors ==
Three of Maclear's books are Junior Library Guild selections: Bloom (2018), Operatic (2019), and It Began with a Page (2020).

Four of her books have been included on lists of the best books of the year. In 2016, Shelf Awareness included The Liszts on their list of the best picture books of the year. In 2019, Kirkus Reviews and the Chicago Public Library named It Began with a Page one of the best books of the year. Booklist included it on their 2020 "Top 10 Biographies for Youth" and "Top 10 Arts Books for Youth" lists. In 2019, Booklist included Operatic on their "Top 10 Graphic Novels for Youth" and "Top 10 Arts Books for Youth" lists. In 2021, The Horn Book Magazine and Publishers Weekly named The Big Bath House one of the best picture books of the year.

Kumo the Bashful Cloud, illustrated by Nathalie Dion, won the 2023 Golden Kite Award for Picture Book Illustration.

In 2023, she was the winner of the Vicky Metcalf Award for Literature for Young People, a career achievement award for her body of work.

Awards for Maclear's writing
Year	Title	Award	Result	Ref.
2018	Birds Art Life	Trillium Book Award	Winner	
2008	The Letter Opener	Amazon.ca First Novel Award	Finalist	
2017	Birds Art Life	Hilary Weston Writers' Trust Prize for Nonfiction	Shortlist	
2019	Bloom	Amelia Bloomer Book List	Selection	
2019	It Began with a Page	Booklist Editors' Choice: Books for Youth	Selection	
2019	Operatic	Cybils Award for Elementary and Middle Grade Graphic Novel	Finalist	
2020	It Began with a Page	ALSC Notable Children's Books	Selection	
2020	It Began with a Page	Boston Globe–Horn Book Award	Honor	
2020	Operatic	Forest of Reading Red Maple Award	Finalist	
2021	It Began with a Page	Rise: A Feminist Book Project	Top 10	
2022	The Big Bath House	ALSC Notable Children's Books	Selection	
2022	The Big Bath House	Governor General's Award for English-language Young People's Literature - Illustrated Books	Finalist	
2023	Unearthing	Governor General's Award for English-language non-fiction	Winner	
2026	A Door is to Open	Governor General's Award for English-language Young People's Literature - Illustrated Books	Finalist	

== Bibliography ==
=== Novels ===
- The Letter Opener (Toronto: HarperCollins, 2007)
- Stray Love (Toronto: HarperCollins Canada, 2012)

=== Nonfiction ===
- Birds Art Life: A Year of Observation (New York: Scribner, 2017)
- Unearthing: A Story of Tangled Love and Family Secrets (Scriber, 2023)

=== Children's literature ===
- Spork (Toronto: Kids Can Press, 2010. Illustrated by Isabelle Arsenault)
- Virginia Wolf (Toronto: Kids Can Press, 2012. Illustrated by Isabelle Arsenault)
- Mr. Flux (Toronto: Kids Can Press, 2013. Illustrated by Matte Stephens)
- Julia Child (Toronto: Tundra Books, 2014. Illustrated by Julie Morstad)
- The Good Little Book (Tundra Random House, 2015. Illustrated by Marion Arbona)
- The Specific Ocean (Kids Can Press, 2015. Illustrated by Katty Maurey)
- The Liszts (Tundra Books, 2016. Illustrated by Júlia Sardà)
- The Wish Tree (San Francisco: Chronicle Books, 2016. Illustrated by Chris Turnham)
- The Fog (Tundra Books, 2017. Illustrated by Kenard Pak)
- Yak and Dove (Tundra Random House, 2017. Illustrated by Esmé Shapiro)
- BLOOM: A Story of Fashion Designer Elsa Schiaparelli (Tundra Books, 2018. Illustrated by Julie Morstad)
- Flo (Farrar, Straus and Giroux, 2018. Illustrated by Jay Fleck)
- Operatic (Toronto: Groundwood Books, 2019. Illustrated by Byron Eggenschwiler)
- It Began with a Page: How Gyo Fujikawa Drew the Way (New York: HarperCollins, 2019. Illustrated by Julie Morstad)
- Story Boat (Tundra Books, 2020. Illustrated by Rashin Kheiriyeh)
- The Big Bath House (Random House Studio, 2021. Illustrated by Gracey Zhang)
- Hello, Rain! (Chronicle Books, 2021. Illustrated by Chris Turnham)
- If You Were A City (Chronicle Books, 2022. Illustrated by Francesca Sanna)
- Kumo: The Bashful Cloud (Tundra Book, 2022. Illustrated by Nathalie Dion)
- Noodles on a Bicycle (Random House Studio, 2024. Illustrated by Gracey Zhang)
