= Tanya Lloyd Kyi =

Children's book author

Tanya Lloyd Kyi is an author from Vancouver, Canada. Known for her young adult literature, Kyi has written more than 30 books for children and adults. As a child, Kyi lived in Crawford Bay, British Columbia. In 1996, Kyi graduated from University of Victoria where she studied writing. In 2020, Kyi published Me and Banksy, a middle-grade novel that explored security and privacy issues. Me and Banksy was named a finalist in the British Columbia and Yukon Book Awards. That same year, she published the nonfiction This Is Your Brain on Stereotypes, which was named among the Best Informational Books for Older Readers of 2020 by the Chicago Public Library, among other awards. In 2024, Kyi published The City of Lost Cats.
