= Julie Flett =

Cree-Métis author and illustrator

- Born: Toronto, Ontario
- Known for: Illustrator, writer of Children's literature
- Notable work: We All Play, Birdsong, The Girl and the Wolf, When We Were Alone, We Sang You Home, My Heart Fills With Happiness, Little You
- Awards: TD Canadian Children's Literature Award; American Indian Youth Literature Award Elizabeth Mrazik-Cleaver Award Aboriginal Literature Award Canadian Native Arts Foundation Visual Arts Acquisition Program

Julie Flett is a Cree-Métis author and illustrator, known for her work in children's literature centered around the life and cultures of Indigenous Canadians. Flett is best known for her illustrations in books such as Little You, and When We were Alone, as well as for her written work in books such as Birdsong. Many of Flett's books are bilingual, and written in a combination of English, Michif, and Cree, and serve as an introduction to Michif and Cree for English-speaking readers. Flett's works are critically successful and have been awarded the Governor General's Literary Award and the TD Canadian Children's Literature Award.

Flett is also known for her advocacy work in Vancouver's Downtown Eastside neighborhood with indigenous youth and other community members. Flett is also involved in efforts to preserve and share indigenous languages among English-speaking populations.

== Personal life ==
Flett was born in Toronto, Ontario where she lived with her Swampy-Cree Métis father and Scottish-Irish mother. She studied for one year at Alberta College of Art and Design, taking coursework in textiles, before transferring to Emily Carr University of Art + Design in Vancouver, British Columbia, taking courses in film and studio arts. She completed a degree in Fine Arts at Concordia University in Montreal and afterwards relocated to Vancouver. Upon returning to Vancouver, Flett became involved with advocacy work for women on Vancouver's Downtown East Side. Working for the Positive Women's Network as an outreach worker and arts educator. Flett was also involved in print making classes where she worked with indigenous youth and community members.

Early encounters with Inuit printmaking and paintings initially drove Flett's interest in the arts. Cree and Inuit cultures, and artists including Meelia Kelly, Pitseolak Ashoona, Annie Pootoogook, and Christi Belcourt are also notable influences on Flett's work, in addition to her mother who worked as a textile artist. Additionally, The Woman in the Dunes by the Japanese writer Kōbō Abe is stated as having a profound effect on Flett.

== Works ==
Flett's writing and illustrations primarily centre Indigenous people, particularly Cree and Métis children, and their family relationships. Flett's picture books and illustration work as seen in Wild Berries/Pakwa Che Menisu, Lii Yuboo Nayaapiwak Swer (L'Alfabet De Michif)/Owls See Clearly at Night (A Michif Alphabet), and We All Count utilize bilingual texts and themes of indigenous culture, and aim to promote voices of indigenous characters within her body of work. Her work also focuses heavily on language, and the importance of representation of indigenous languages and narratives within contemporary literature. Flett's books, such as Wild Berries, have been praised for their cultural relevance and accessibility, and for their utility as resources for Cree and Michif language education.

Early examples of Flett's work in children's books include her digital collages created for The Moccasins written by Earl Einarson. This style of digital collage work would go on to form the basis for Flett's future work, which eventually grew to include watercolor paintings, and handmade textile patterns inspired by the work of her mother, as well as visual motifs linked to Cree mythology and visual culture. Flett has described her process as largely based on the tone of a given piece, where the basis of the image such as a landscape or interior background, is used to establish the themes and color scheme of the illustrations.

== Reception ==
Flett's work quickly garnered critical attention and favor upon the publishing of The Moccasins in 2004, and gained further attention as her career continued in Zoe and the Fawn. Flett's 2019 book Birdsong was awarded the 2020 TD Canadian Children's Literature Award, and was named a finalist for the Governor General's Literary Award for young people's literature, selected as a best picture book of 2019 by Kirkus Reviews, School Library Journal, Publishers Weekly, and The Horn Book Magazine, as well as an honor title for the 2020 American Indian Youth Literature Award.

In 2025 the Writers' Trust of Canada named her the recipient of the Vicky Metcalf Award for Literature for Young People for her body of work.

Book Title	Award	Result
On the Trapline (Illustrator)	Governor General's Literary Award	Won
Birdsong (Author and Illustrator)	TD Canadian Children's Literature Award	Won
Birdsong (Author and Illustrator)	Governor General's Literary Award	Shortlisted
Birdsong (Author and Illustrator)	American Indian Youth Literature Award	Honor Title
When We Were Alone (Illustrator)	McNally Robinson Book for Young People Award, Manitoba Book Awards	Won
When We Were Alone (Illustrator)	Governor General's Literary Award - Young people's literature — illustrated books	Won
We Sang You Home (Illustrator)	Bank Street College of Education Best Children's Books of the Year (2017)	Commended
We Sang You Home (Illustrator)	CCBC Best Books (2017)	Commended
We Sang You Home (Illustrator)	BOLOGNARAGAZZI AWARD Toddlers (2019)	Commended
My Heart Fills with Happiness (Illustrator)	Christie Harris Illustrated Children's Literature Prize (2017)	Won
My Heart Fills with Happiness (Illustrator)	Girls of Summer Reading List (2017)	Commended
My Heart Fills with Happiness (Illustrator)	Bank Street College of Education Best Children's Books of the Year (2017)	Commended
My Heart Fills with Happiness (Illustrator)	Global Read Aloud (2018)	Commended
My Heart Fills with Happiness (Illustrator)	Indigenous Literature Award (2018)	Short-listed
Pakwa Che Menisu / Wild Berries	First Nations Communities READ	Won
Little You (Illustrator)	2016 American Indian Youth Literature Award Best Picture Book	Won
Lii Yuboo Nayaapiwak Swer (L'Alfabet De Michif) / Owls See Clearly at Night (A Michif Alphabet)	Governor General's Award for Young People's Literature - Illustrated Books	Nominated
Lii Yuboo Nayaapiwak Swer (L'Alfabet De Michif) / Owls See Clearly at Night (A Michif Alphabet)	Children's Literature - Illustration	Nominated
Lii Yuboo Nayaapiwak Swer (L'Alfabet De Michif) / Owls See Clearly at Night (A Michif Alphabet)	2011 Amelia Frances Howard-Gibbon Award Shortlist	Honorable Mention
Lii Yuboo Nayaapiwak Swer (L'Alfabet De Michif) / Owls See Clearly at Night (A Michif Alphabet)	Christie Harris Illustrated Children's Literature Prize	Won
Lii Yuboo Nayaapiwak Swer (L'Alfabet De Michif) / Owls See Clearly at Night (A Michif Alphabet)	2010 Elizabeth Mrazik-Cleaver Award	Won
Lii Yuboo Nayaapiwak Swer (L'Alfabet De Michif) / Owls See Clearly at Night (A Michif Alphabet)	BC Book Prizes	Won
Lii Yuboo Nayaapiwak Swer (L'Alfabet De Michif) / Owls See Clearly at Night (A Michif Alphabet)	Alcuin Society Book Design Awards Honor Book	Won
Zoe and The Fawn (Illustrator)	Multicultural Picture Book in the 2007 Moonbeam Children's Books Awards (Medal)	Won
The Moccasins (Illustrator)	Christie Harris Illustrated Children's Literature Prize	Nominated
The Moccasins (Illustrator)	2004 Canadian Native Arts Foundation Visual Arts Acquisition Program	Won
Collective Works	2014 Aboriginal Literature Award	
A Day with Yayah (illustrator)	Christie Harris Illustrated Children's Literature Prize	Finalist
A Day with Yayah (illustrator)	Ânskohk Aboriginal Children's Book of the Year	Won
