= Forest of Reading =

Canadian reading program

- Genre: Literary Arts
- Frequency: Annual
- Locations: Toronto Ontario, Canada
- Years active: 32
- Established: 1994
- Website: Official Website

The Forest of Reading is Canada's largest recreational reading program, featuring ten award programs and run by the Ontario Library Association (OLA). Programs are primarily geared towards French and English readers in kindergarten to grade twelve, but do also include programs targeting adult readers and ESL learners. The Forest awards are selected by readers themselves, who choose the winning titles for each award by voting for their favourite books.

Forest of Reading award winners are announced annually at the Forest of Reading Festival (previously The Festival of Trees), which is Canada's largest annual literary event for children, attracting as many as 15,000 youth annually. In addition to award ceremonies, the Festival also includes many author and illustrator events, including hands-on workshops.

== History ==
In the early 1990s, the OLA conducted a small survey about recreational reading programs being offered by school libraries and concluded that more needed to be done to encourage reading for pleasure in school-aged children. Inspired by the success of the Texas Bluebonnet Awards, a reading award program that was selected through reader votes, OLA representatives adapted the program for Ontario to re-stimulate school library interest in reading through the promotion of reading for pleasure. The program was also intended to increase awareness for Canadian books and authors.

The first Forest of Reading Awards program, the Silver Birch Awards program, was launched in 1994. It targeted children in grades 4–6 and focused on both fiction and non-fiction books. As the program gained traction, the Silver Birch Award attracted the attention of principals and teachers who encouraged its adoption in ever-widening circles, providing teacher-librarians with much needed support. Five years later, in 1999, the Red Maple Awards program was established for Grades 7–9 in response to growing school demand. Today, the Forest of Reading has expanded to include eight additional reading programs and is the largest program of its kind in the country.

== Objectives ==
The stated objectives of the Forest of Reading are:

- fostering a love of reading
- encouraging academic and social success in children through reading
- emphasizes the importance of libraries
- supports Canadian books, publishers, authors and illustrators.

== Award programs ==
The Forest of Reading consists of ten reading programs:

- Blue Spruce Award – ages 4-7 (JK–Grade 2), English, picture books
- Silver Birch Express Award – ages 8-10 (Grades 3–4), English, fiction/non-fiction
- Silver Birch Fiction Award – ages 8-12 (Grades 3–6 ), English, fiction
- Yellow Cedar Award – ages 9-14 (Grades 4–8), English, non-fiction
- Red Maple Award™ – ages 12-14 (Grades 7–8), English, fiction
- White Pine Award – high school (Grades 9–12), English, fiction
- Le prix Peuplier – ages vary, simple stories that can be read aloud, French, picture books
- Le prix Mélèze (formerly Le prix Tamarac Express) – ages vary, short chapter books, less than 100 pages, or advanced picture books, French, fiction/nonfiction
- Le prix Tamarac – ages vary, chapter books, 100-250 pages, French, fiction/nonfiction
- Evergreen Award – adult, fiction/non-fiction

The Forest of Reading retired awards are:

- Golden Oak Award (2003–2018)

Other lists:

- Light Reads, Great Stories (for readers in adult literacy programs, ESL students and readers, and adult learners)
- Kid Committee List
- Teen Committee List
- OLA Best Bets Committee List

== Festivals and ceremonies ==
The school-aged programs have one large award ceremony in the spring, which is delivered at the Forest of Reading Festival (formerly the Festival of Trees) at the Harbourfront Centre, Toronto. The festival take place over three days and includes workshops, author signings, and the awards ceremonies themselves. In 2012, the Festival began touring with Satellite Festivals, which have been held in Thunder Bay, North Bay, Parry Sound, Ottawa, Sault Ste. Marie, Kitchener and London. 2014 also saw the addition of a French festival in Toronto.

The Evergreen Award winner is announced in November and the award is presented during the OLA's Super Conference in Toronto.
