= Cultural depictions of cats =

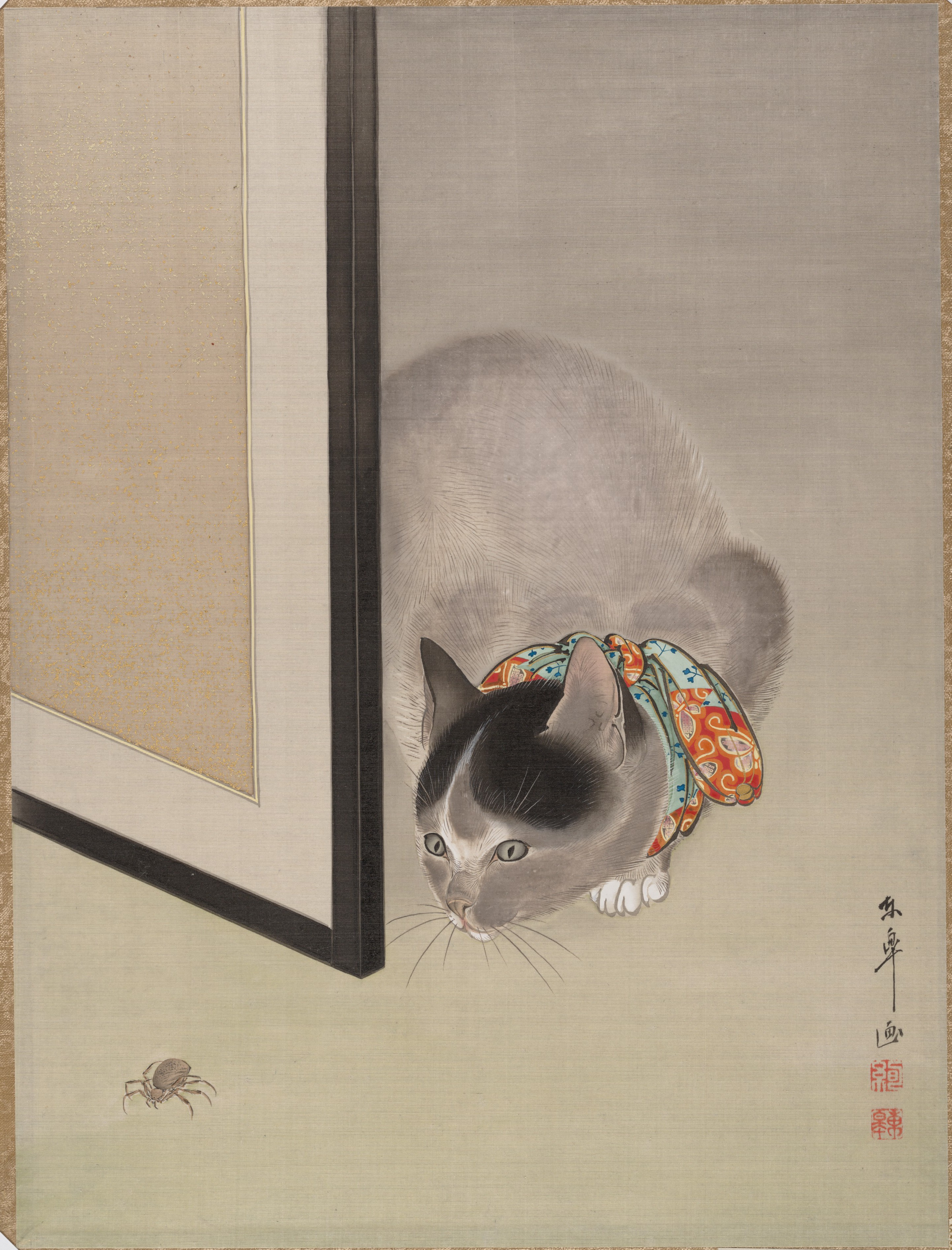
"Cat Watching a Spider" by Ōide Tōkō

The cultural depiction of cats and their relationship to humans is old and stretches back over 9,500 years. Cats are featured in the history of many nations, are the subject of legend, and are a favorite subject of artists and writers.

== History ==
While the exact history of human interaction with cats is still somewhat vague, a shallow grave site discovered in 1983 in Cyprus, dating to 7500 BCE, during the Neolithic period, contains the skeleton of a human, buried ceremonially with stone tools, a lump of iron oxide, and a handful of seashells. In its own tiny grave 40 cm (16 in) from the human grave was an eight-month-old cat, its body oriented in the same westward direction as the human skeleton. Cats are not native to Cyprus. This is evidence that cats were being tamed just as humankind was establishing the first settlements in the part of the Middle East known as the Fertile Crescent.

The lineage of today's cats stems from about 4500 BC and came from Europe and Southeast Asia according to a recent study. Modern cats stem from two major lines of lineage.

== Near East ==
=== Ancient Egypt ===
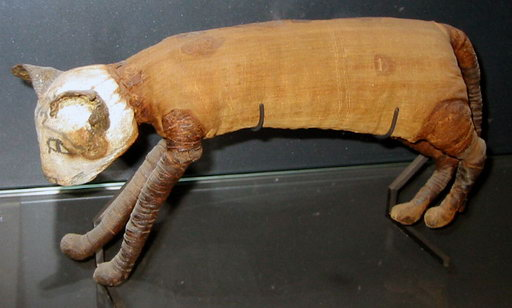
The ancient Egyptians mummified their cat companions out of respect in the same way that they mummified people.

Cats, known in ancient Egypt as the mau, played a large role in ancient Egyptian society. They were associated with the goddesses Isis and Bastet. Cats were sacred animals, and the goddess Bastet was often depicted in cat form, sometimes taking on the war-like aspect of a lioness. Killing a cat was forbidden, and the Greek historian Herodotus reports that when a household cat died, the family shaved their eyebrows in mourning. Dead cats were taken to the city of Bubastis, where they were embalmed and buried in designated repositories.

Egyptian hieroglyphics have a character for cat: 𓃠

=== Mesopotamia ===
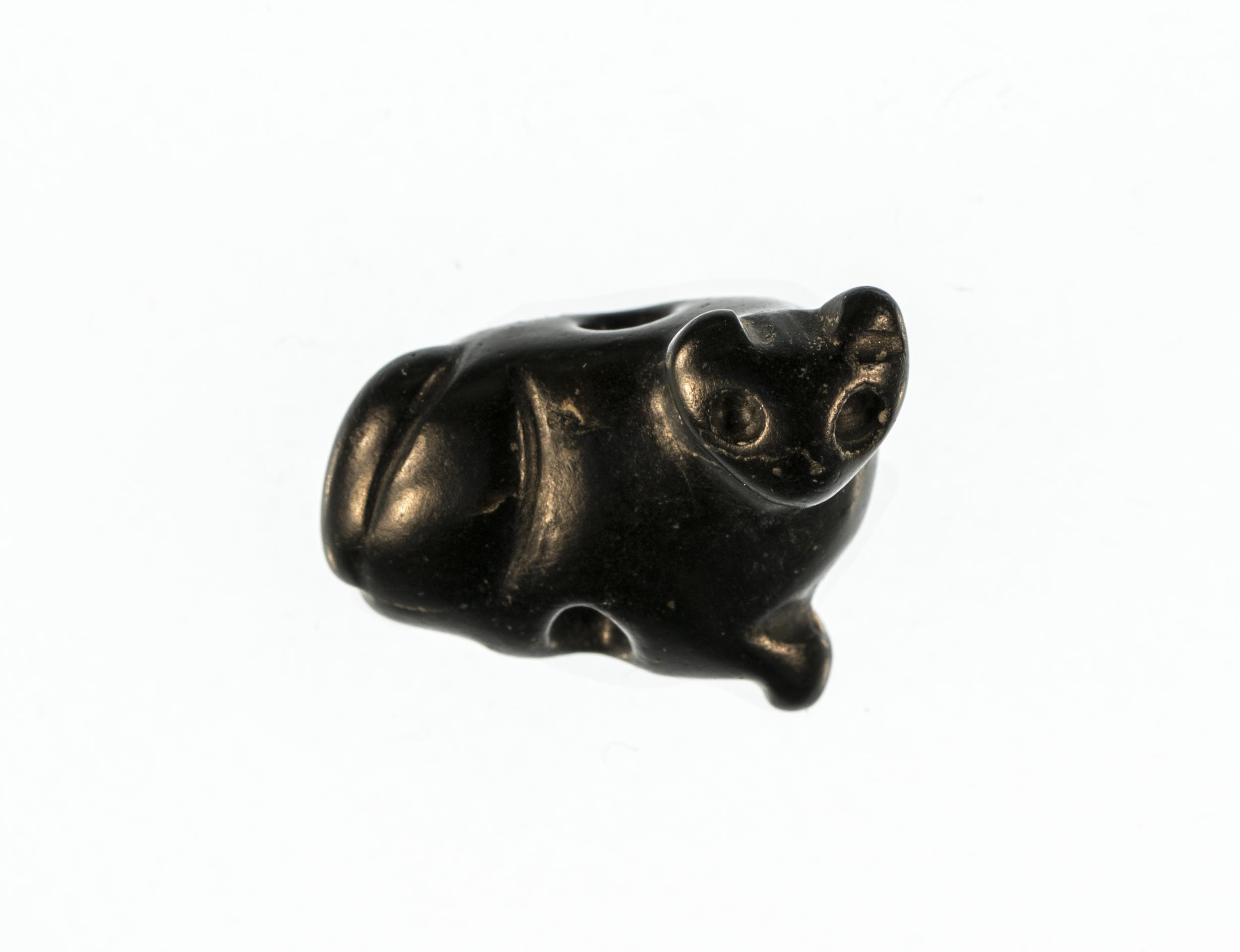
Black hematite stamp seal, amulet or model in the form of a couchant animal, possibly a cat, with perforation and incised base.

In ancient Mesopotamian civilizations, including Sumer, Akkad, Babylonia, and Assyria, cats were used primarily for pest control in domestic and agricultural settings. Zooarchaeological evidence documents the presence of domestic cats in the Near East by the late second millennium BCE. Unlike in Egypt, cats were not objects of formal cult worship, though they appear to have been tolerated in domestic contexts.

=== Levant ===
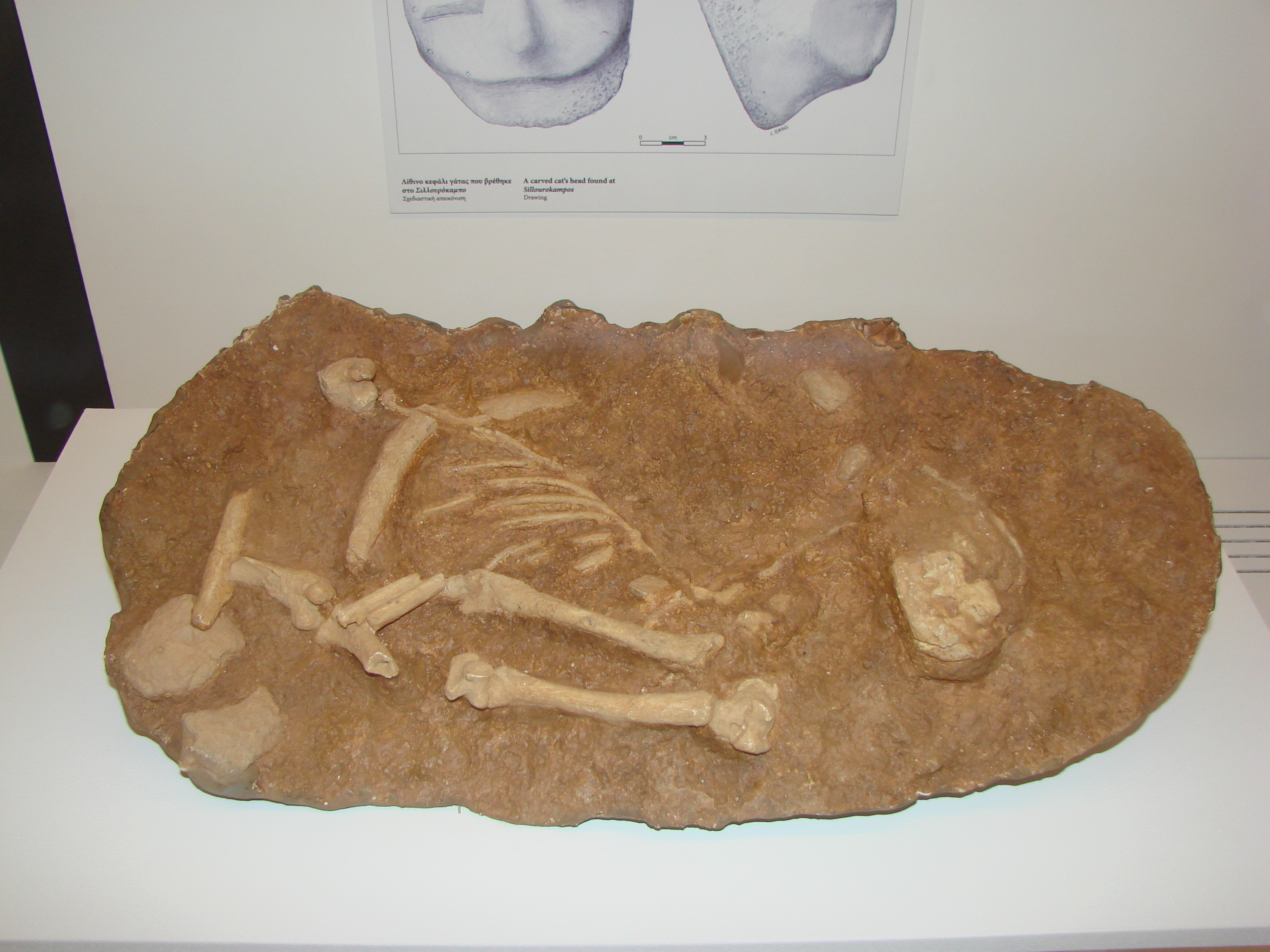
Neolithic cat burial from Shillourokambos, Cyprus.

In the ancient Levant, including Canaanite, Phoenician, and Israelite cultures, cats are attested mainly in domestic contexts. Archaeological remains from Levantine settlements indicate their presence in areas associated with food storage and trade. Cats are largely absent from surviving religious iconography and mythological texts.

=== Anatolia ===
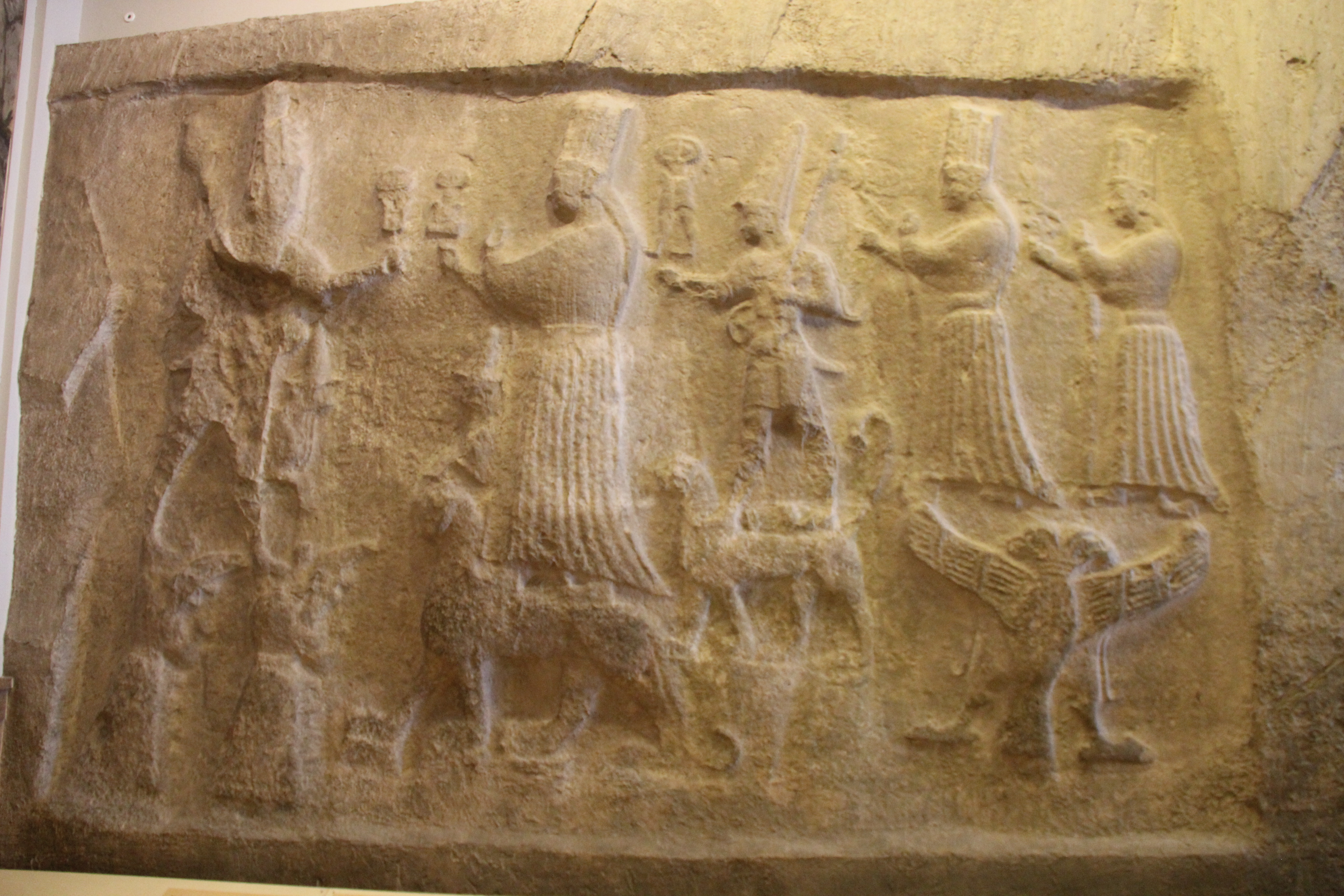
Animal figures in Hittite reliefs at Yazılıkaya.

Evidence from Anatolia indicates familiarity with domestic cats during the Hittite period and later eras. References to cats are infrequent in textual and material sources, suggesting their use was limited to practical domestic functions such as pest control.

=== Persia ===
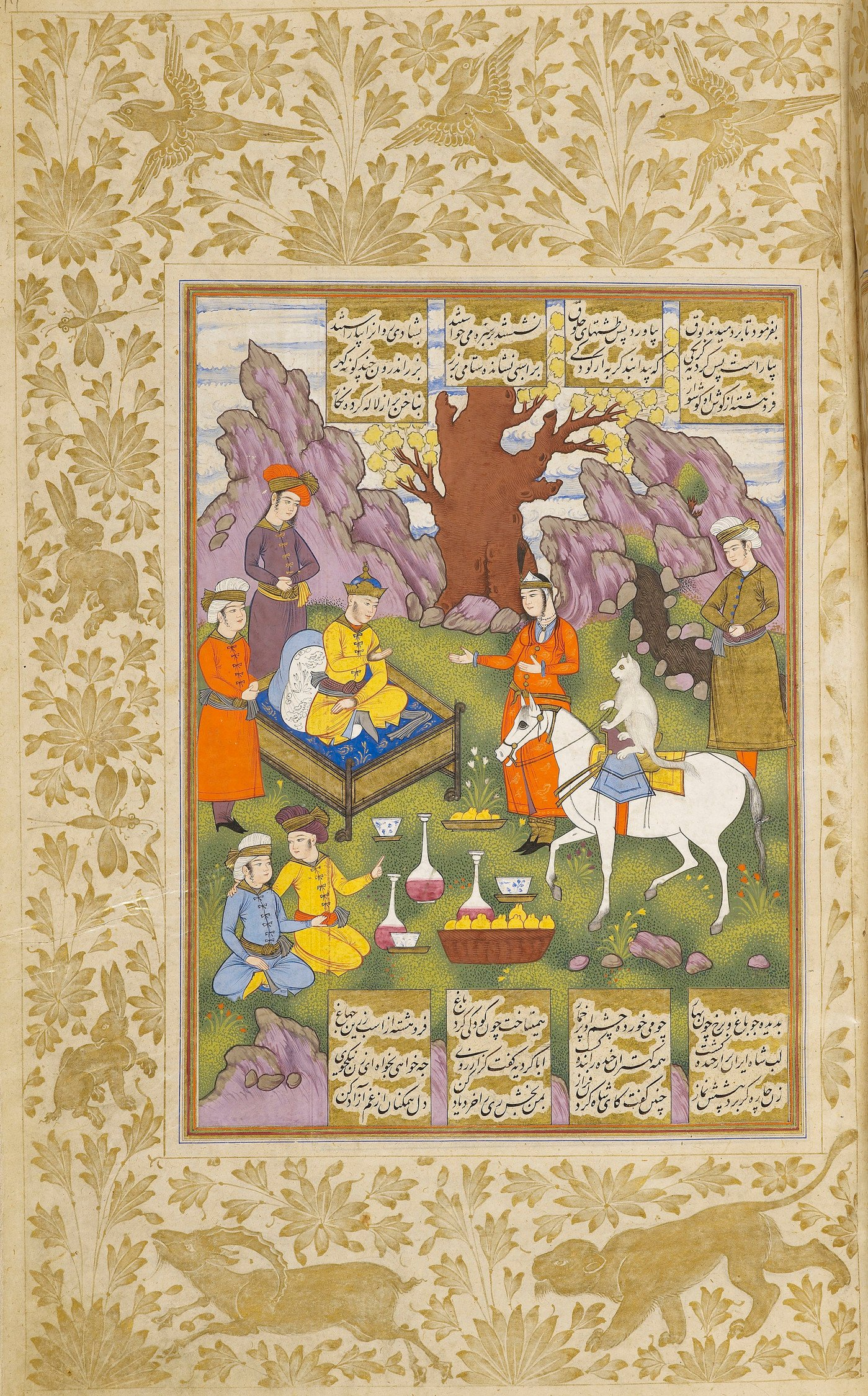
Persian miniature from a 17th-century Shahnameh manuscript showing Gurdiyah presenting Khusraw with an equestrian cat.

In ancient Persia, particularly during the Achaemenid period, cats were present in domestic environments. Although cats held no formal role in Zoroastrian religious practice, they were tolerated within households. Later Persian literary and artistic traditions, including illustrated manuscripts of the Shahnameh, depict domestic cats, reflecting their continued presence in Iranian cultural contexts.

=== Islam ===
Although no species are sacred in Islam, cats are revered by Muslims. Some Western writers have stated Muhammad had a favorite cat, Muezza. He is reported to have loved cats so much that, "he would do without his cloak rather than disturb one that was sleeping on it". The story has no origin in early Muslim writers, and seems to confuse a story of a later Sufi saint, Ahmed ar-Rifa'i, centuries after Muhammad.

== Western and Central Europe ==
=== Ancient Greece and Rome ===
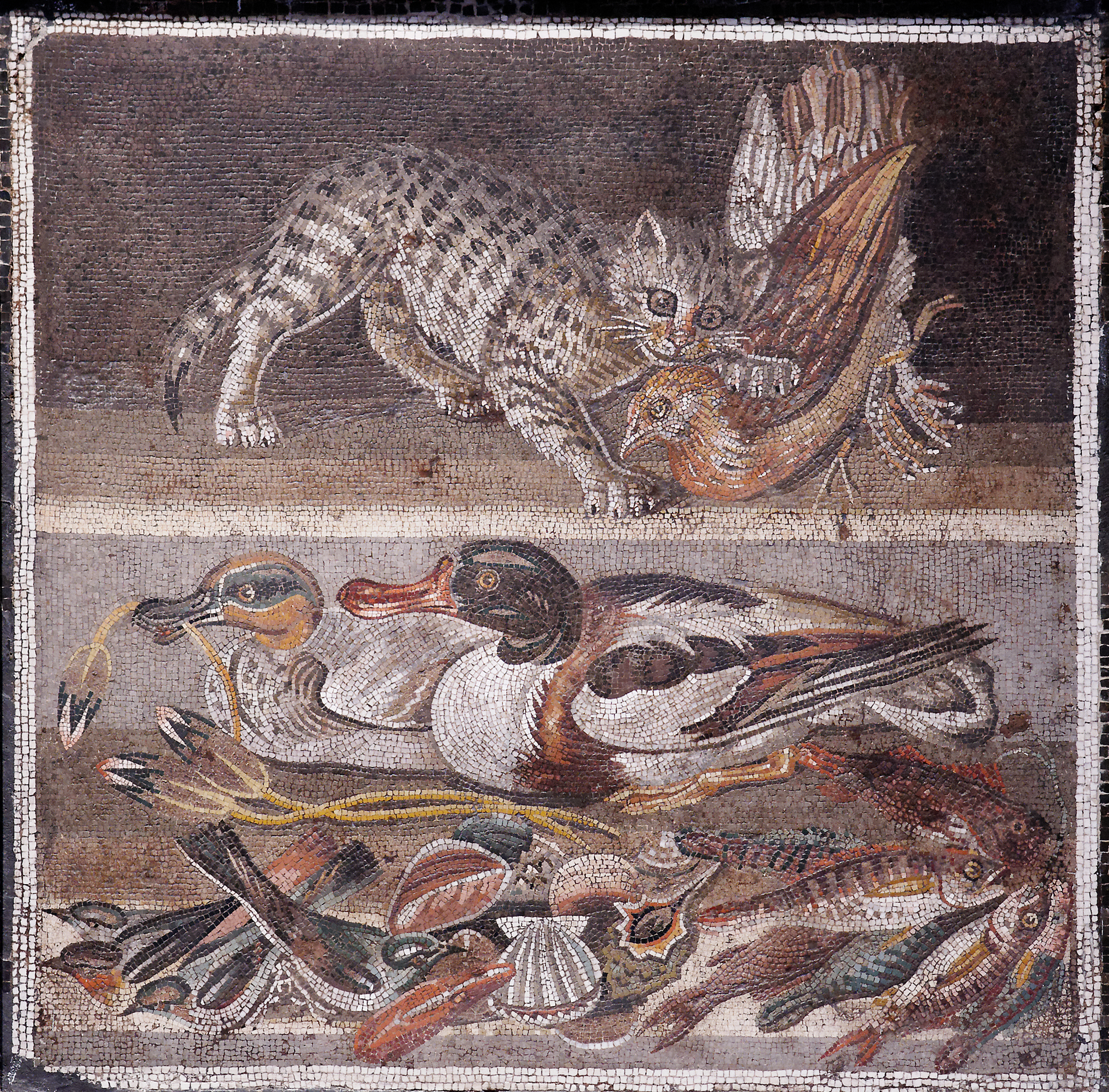
Ancient Roman mosaic of a cat killing a partridge from the House of the Faun in Pompeii

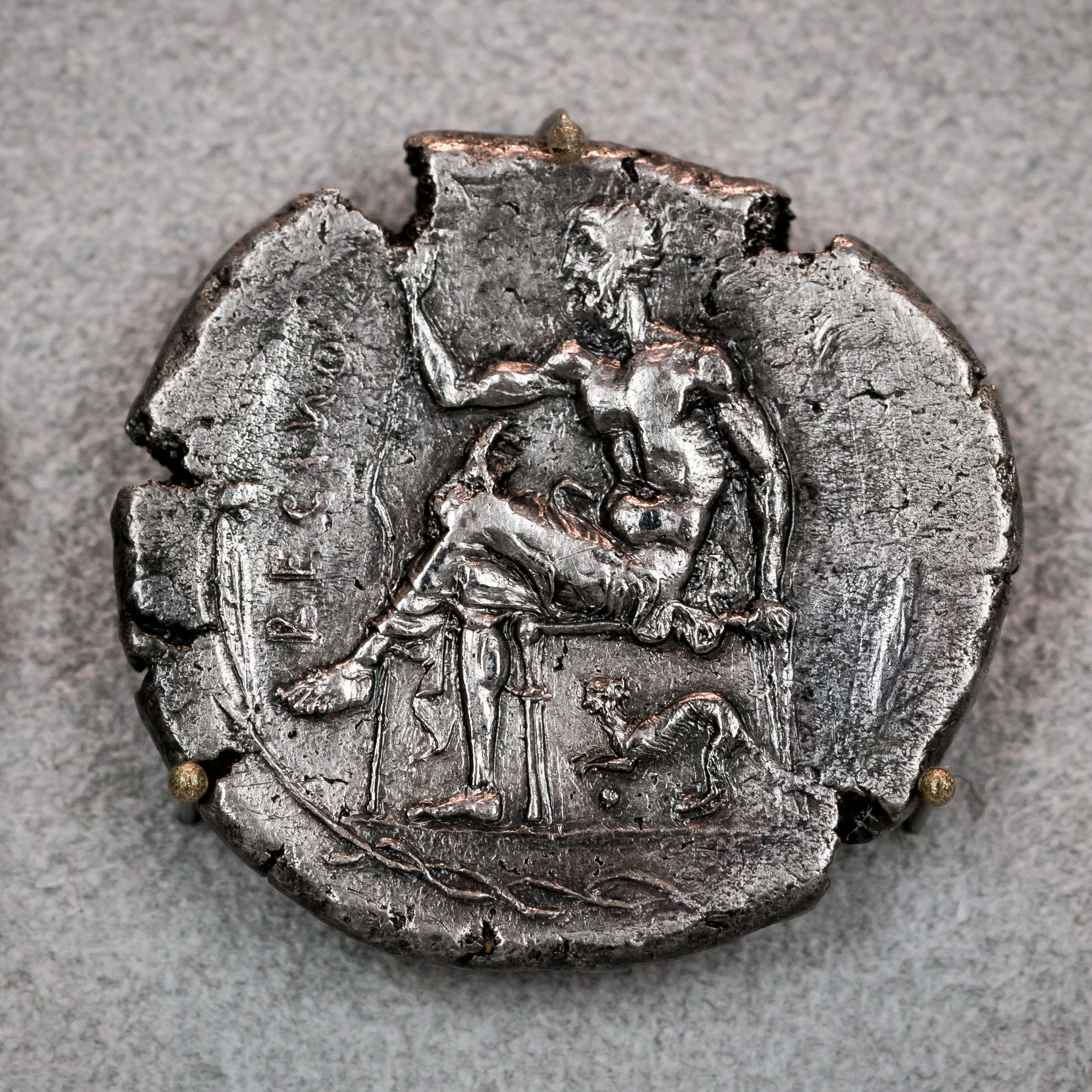
Similar Greek coin from Rhegion, showing the city founder playing with a cat

Domestic cats were probably first introduced to Greece and southern Italy in the fifth century BC by the Phoenicians. The earliest unmistakable evidence of the Greeks having domestic cats comes from two coins from Magna Graecia dating to the mid-fifth century BC showing Iokastos and Phalanthos, the legendary founders of Rhegion and Taras respectively, playing with their pet cats.

Housecats seem to have been extremely rare among the ancient Greeks and Romans; the Greek historian Herodotus expressed astonishment at the domestic cats in Egypt, because he had only ever seen wildcats. Even during later times, weasels were far more commonly kept as pets and weasels, not cats, were seen as the ideal rodent-killers. The usual ancient Greek word for "cat" was ailouros, meaning "thing with the waving tail", but this word could also be applied to any of the "various long-tailed carnivores kept for catching mice". Cats are rarely mentioned in ancient Greek literature, but Aristotle does remark in his History of Animals that "female cats are naturally lecherous." The Greek essayist Plutarch linked cats with cleanliness, noting that unnatural odors could make them mad. Pliny linked them with lust, and Aesop with deviousness and cunning.

The Greeks later syncretized their own goddess Artemis with the Egyptian goddess Bastet, adopting Bastet's associations with cats and ascribing them to Artemis. In Ovid's Metamorphoses, when the gods flee to Egypt and take animal forms, the goddess Diana (the Roman equivalent of Artemis) turns into a cat. Cats eventually displaced ferrets as the pest control of choice because they were more pleasant to have around the house and were more enthusiastic hunters of mice.

=== Norse and Celtic mythology ===
In Norse mythology, the goddess Freyja was associated with cats. Farmers sought protection for their crops by leaving pans of milk in their fields for Freya's special feline companions, the two grey cats who fought with her and pulled her chariot.

In Celtic Mythology, a Cat Sith is a fairy cat, sith or sidhe (both pronounced shee) meaning fairy.

=== Middle Ages ===
During the Middle Ages, many of Artemis' associations with cats were grafted onto the Virgin Mary. Cats are often shown in icons of Annunciation and of the Holy Family and, according to Italian folklore, on the same night that Mary gave birth to Jesus, a cat in Bethlehem gave birth to a kitten.

In Christianity, the patron saint of cats is Saint Gertrude of Nivelles.

Vikings used cats as rat catchers and companions.

An old Irish poem about an author (a monk) and his cat, Pangur Bán, was found in a 9th century manuscript. Pangur Bán, 'White Pangur', is the cat's name, Pangur meaning 'a fuller'. In eight verses of four lines each, the author compares the cat's happy hunting with his own scholarly pursuits.

I and Pangur Ban my cat,
'Tis a like task we are at:
Hunting mice is his delight,
Hunting words I sit all night.

A medieval King of Wales, Hywel Dda (the Good) passed legislation making it illegal to kill or harm a cat.

Black cats are generally held to be unlucky in Western Europe (and as a result, this superstition can be found in the rest of the Western world), and to portend good luck in the United Kingdom. In the latter country, a black cat entering a house or ship is a good omen, and a sailor's wife should have a black cat for her husband's safety on the sea. Elsewhere, it is considered unlucky if a black cat crosses one's path; black cats have been associated with death and darkness. White cats, bearing the color of ghosts, are conversely held to be unlucky in the United Kingdom, while tortoiseshell cats are lucky. It is common lore that cats have nine lives. It is a tribute to their perceived durability, their occasional apparent lack of instinct for self-preservation, and their seeming ability to survive falls that would be fatal to other animals.

Folklore in the Low Countries dating back to as early as 1607 tells that a cat will suffocate a newborn infant by putting its nose to the child's mouth, sucking the breath out of the infant.

In Medieval Ypres, cats were used in the winter months to control the vermin infesting the wool stored in the upper floors of the Cloth Hall. At the start of the spring warm-up, after the wool had been sold, the cats were thrown out of the belfry tower to the town square below, which supposedly symbolized "the killing of evil academics". In today's Kattenstoet ('Cat Parade'), this was commuted to the throwing of woollen cats from the top of out houses and also the people from the Middle Ages often used to suck on the wool as a sign of good luck.

=== Renaissance and Victorian depictions ===
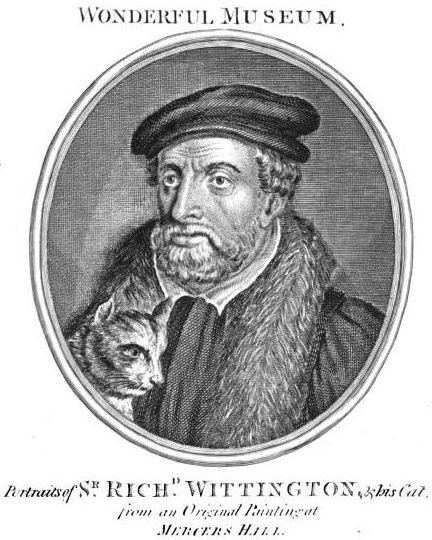
Richard Whittington and his Cat (1808)

In the Renaissance, cats were often thought to be witches' familiars in England like Grimalkin, the first witch's familiar in Macbeth's opening scene.

Cats became popular and sympathetic characters in folk tales such as Puss in Boots. One English folk tale in which a cat is given a role of a friend who was betrayed is Dick Whittington and His Cat, which has been adapted for many stage works, including plays, musical comedies, and pantomimes. It tells of a poor boy in the 14th century, based on the real-life Richard Whittington, who becomes a wealthy merchant and eventually the Lord Mayor of London because of the ratting abilities of his cat. There is no historical evidence that Whittington had a cat. In the tale, Dick Whittington, a poor orphan finds work at the great house of Mr. Fitzwarren, a rich merchant. His little room infested with rats, Dick acquires a cat, who drives off the rats. One day, Mr. Fitzwarren asked his servants if they wished to send something in his ship, leaving on a journey to a far off port, to trade for gold. Dick decided to sell his only close friend, his cat. In the far-off court, Dick's cat had become a hero by driving very troublesome vermin from the royal court. When Fitzwarren's ship returned, it was loaded with riches. Dick was a rich man. He joined Mr. Fitzwarren in his business and married his daughter Alice, and in time became the Lord Mayor of London. This plot shows not only the attitude towards cats, but also the mentality of this people as a whole, where friends and friendship are a commodity that needs to be sold profitably.

The Cat Duet (Duetto buffo di due gatti), attributed to Gioachino Rossini, is a popular performance piece for two sopranos, whose "lyrics" consist entirely of the repeated word "miau" ("meow").

== Russia ==
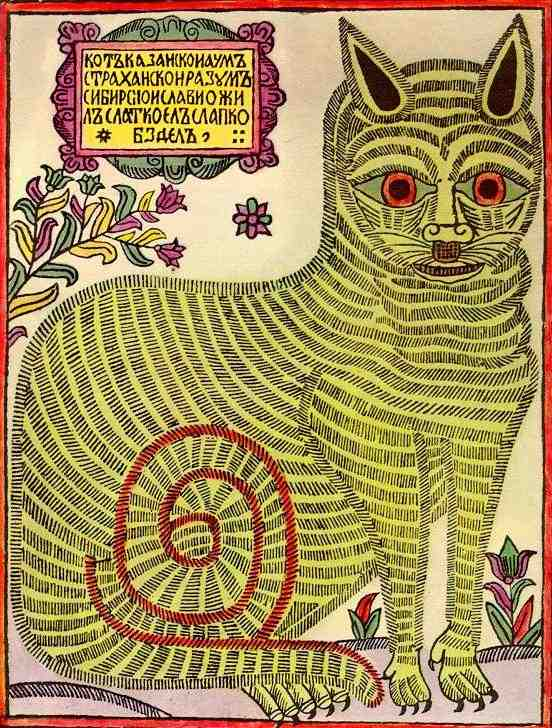
Eighteenth century folk art, Cat of Kazan

Although Russia is geographically located in Europe, attitudes toward cats there have always been radically different from those in Central and Western Europe. Orthodox Christianity not only did not persecute these animals, but rather had an entirely positive attitude toward them. Unlike in Western countries, cats have been considered good luck in Russia for centuries. Owning a cat, and especially letting one into a new house before the humans move in, is said to bring good fortune. Cats in Orthodox Christianity are the only animals that are allowed to enter churches. Also, cats were an integral attribute of Russian Orthodox monasteries. According to Russian law, a high fine was imposed for killing a cat, the same as for a horse or ox.

During the Kievan and early Muscovite periods, cats served not only as rodent protectors but also as a symbol of status and wealth. Later, during the Imperial period, with the widespread adoption of these animals in cities and villages, they became integral members of families. During the Soviet period, with the widespread availability of affordable housing for all, the status of cats became firmly established: it is considered that a true Russian home is unthinkable without a cat. It is noteworthy that, unlike Catholic and Protestant ideas, Orthodox doctrine asserts the immortality of animal souls, which is accordingly reflected in the culture and mentality of people.

Many cats have guarded the Hermitage Museum and Winter Palace continually, since Empress Elizabeth's reign, when she was presented by the city of Kazan in Tatarstan five of their best mousers to control the palace's rodent problem. They lived pampered lives and even had special servants until the October Revolution, after which they were cared for by specially appointed museum staff. Today there is a group of cats at the Hermitage in Saint Petersburg. They have their own press secretary, with about 75 neutered cats of both genders roaming the museum.

== Asia ==
=== China ===
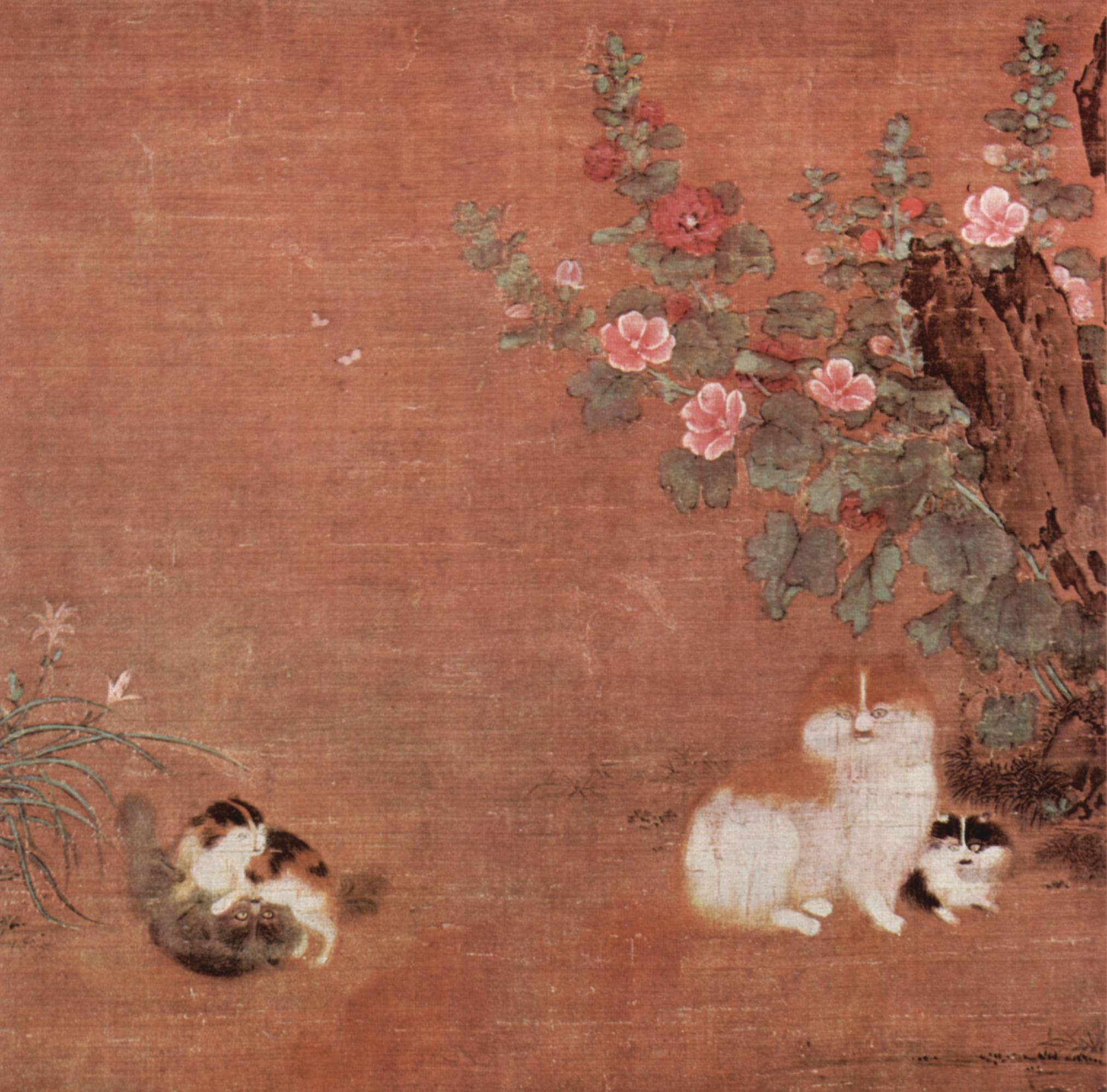
Cats in the Garden, by Mao Yi, 12th century

Cats that were favored pets during the Chinese Song dynasty were long-haired cats for catching rats, and cats with yellow-and-white fur called 'lion-cats', who were valued simply as cute pets. Cats could be pampered with items bought from the market such as "cat-nests", and were often fed fish that were advertised in the market specifically for cats.

=== Japan ===
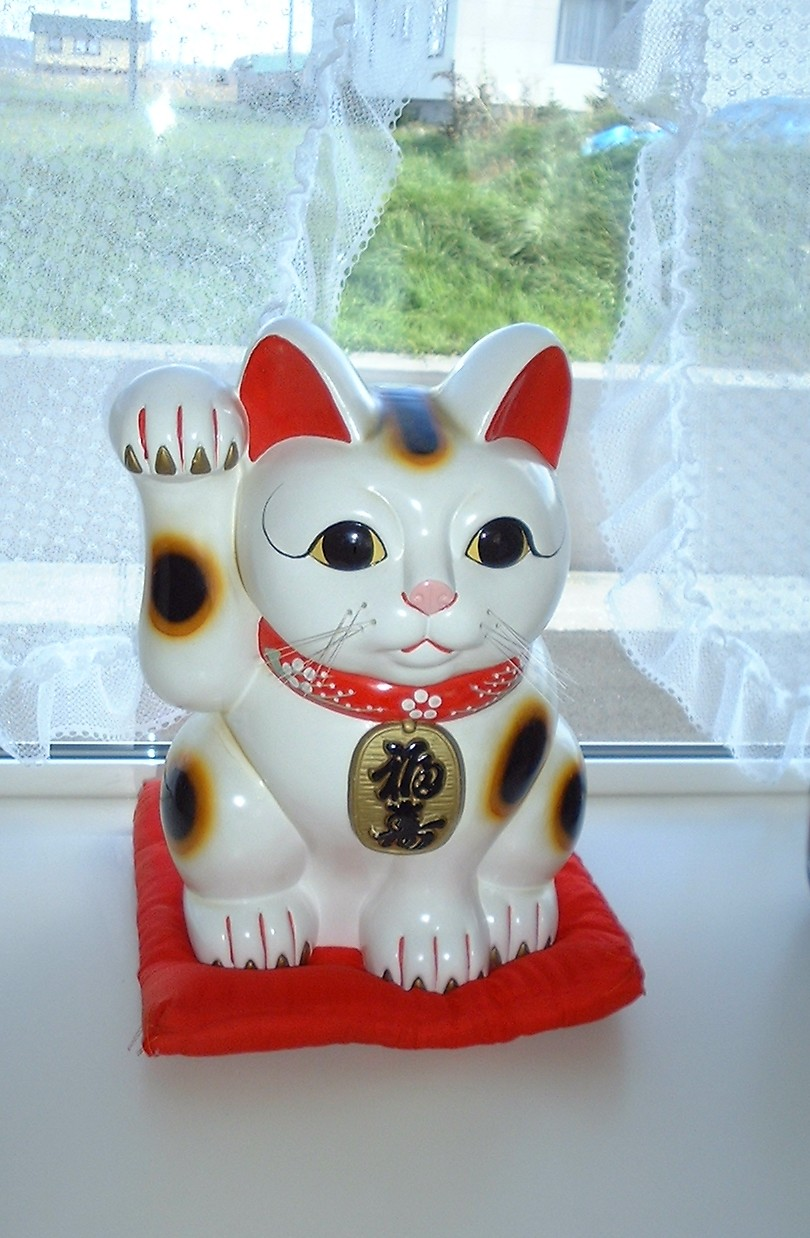
A typical maneki-neko

In Japanese folklore, cats are often depicted as supernatural entities, or kaibyō (かいびょう, "strange cat").

The maneki-neko of Japan is a figurine often believed to bring good luck to the owner. Literally the beckoning cat, it is often referred to in English as the "good fortune" or "good luck" cat. It is usually a sitting cat with one of its paws raised and bent. Legend in Japan has it that a cat waved a paw at a Japanese landlord, who was intrigued by this gesture and went towards it. A few seconds later a lightning bolt struck where the landlord had been previously standing. The landlord attributed his good fortune to the cat's fortuitous action. A symbol of good luck hence, it is most often seen in businesses to draw in money. In Japan, the flapping of the hand is a "come here" gesture, so the cat is beckoning customers.

There is also a small cat shrine (neko jinja (猫神社)) built in the middle of the Tashirojima island. In the past, the islanders raised silkworms for silk, and cats were kept in order to keep the mouse population down (because mice are a natural predator of silkworms). Fixed-net fishing was popular on the island after the Edo period and fishermen from other areas would come and stay on the island overnight. The cats would go to the inns where the fishermen were staying and beg for scraps. Over time, the fishermen developed a fondness for the cats and would observe the cats closely, interpreting their actions as predictions of the weather and fish patterns. One day, when the fishermen were collecting rocks to use with the fixed-nets, a stray rock fell and killed one of the cats. The fishermen, feeling sorry for the loss of the cat, buried it and enshrined it at this location on the island.

This is not the only cat shrine in Japan, however. Others include Nambujinja in the Niigata Prefecture and one at the entrance of Kyōtango, Kyoto.

Another Japanese legend of cats is the nekomata: when a cat lives to a certain age, it grows another tail and can stand up and speak in a human language.

Hello Kitty, created by Yuko Yamaguchi, is a contemporary cat icon. The character made its debut in 1974 and has since become a global staple of Japanese culture; the merchandise is available all over the world. According to Sanrio, the official licenser, designer, and producer of Hello Kitty merchandise, the character is a cartoon version of a little girl. In her fictional life, she is from the outskirts of London and a part of the Sanrio universe.

== Modern culture ==
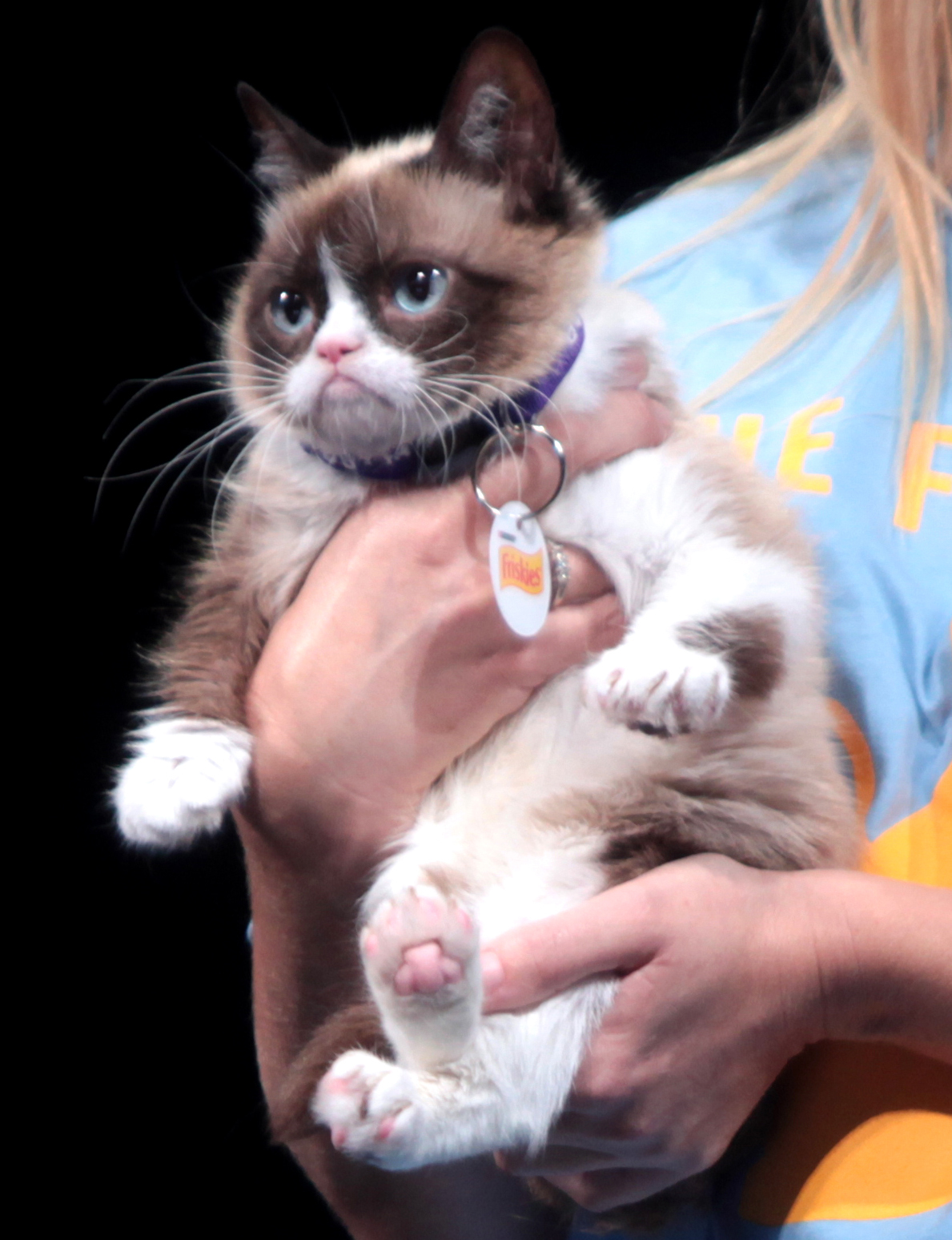
Pictures of Grumpy Cat are frequently found in the form of memes, due to Grumpy Cat's deformed features giving a permanently unhappy appearance.

Cats have also featured prominently in modern culture.

=== United States ===
A cat named Mimsey was used by US production company MTM Enterprises as their mascot and features in their logo as a spoof of the MGM lion. By 1990, the New York Times said that cats had become the most popular subject depicted on gift items (such as coasters, napkins, jewellery, and bookends), and that an estimated 1,000 stores in the United States sold nothing but cat-related items.

=== Internet cats ===
On the Internet, cats frequently appear often as memes and other humor; and on social media people frequently post pictures of their own cats.

Although the ICANN registry includes a set of generic top-level domains associated with specific animals/pets (such as .dog, .horse, .fish) IANA has rejected the addition of a domain name related to cats to their registry. A similar domain zone .cat has been designated for the needs of the Catalan cultural community.

== See also ==
- List of fictional cats
- List of individual cats
- Jaguars in Mesoamerican cultures
- Lion (heraldry)
- Cultural depictions of dogs
- Shashthi
