= Richard Jacobson =

Canadian artist, illustrator, and children's writer

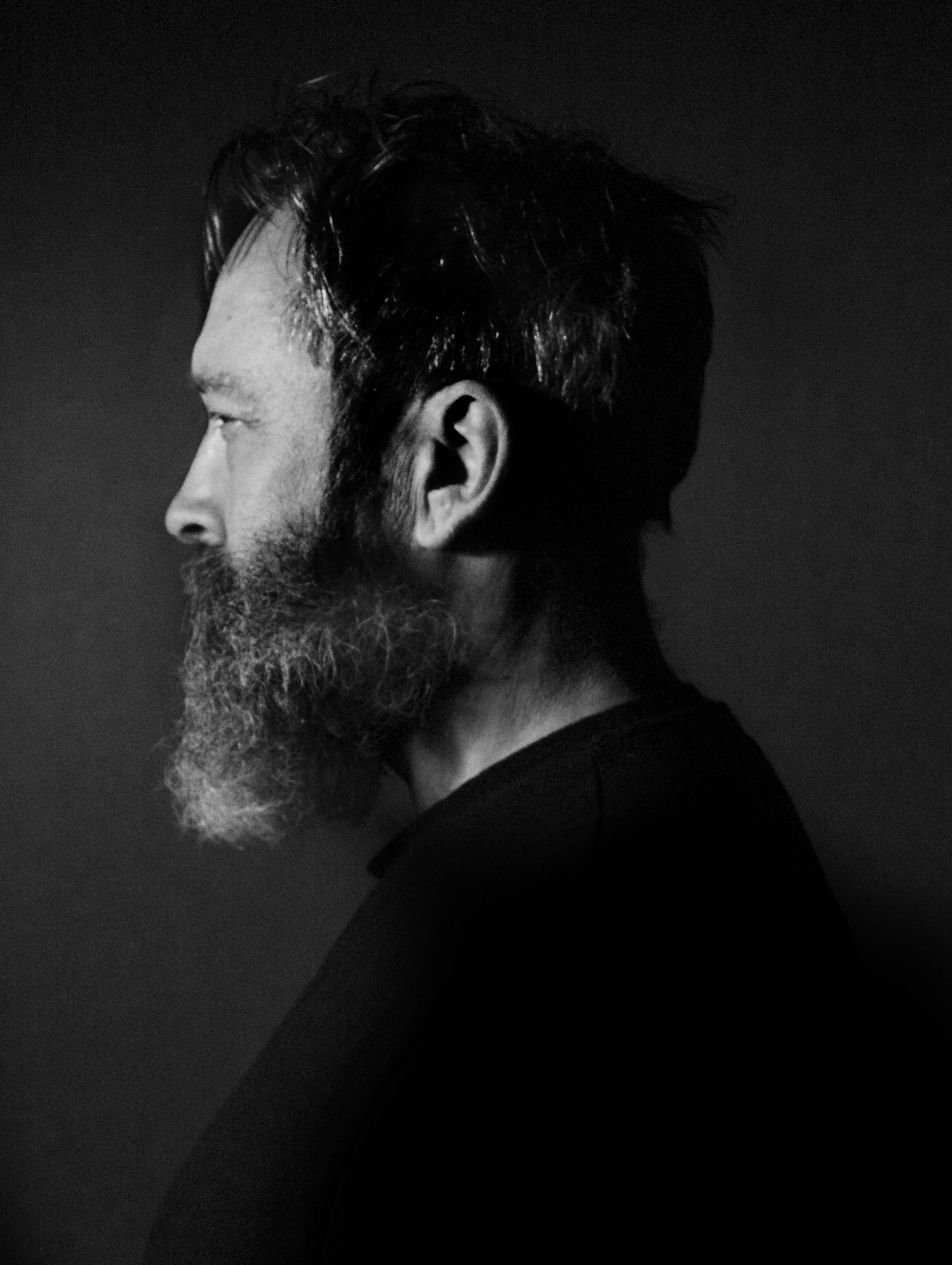
Richard A Jacobson

Richard Allen "Rick" Jacobson (born January 7, 1959) is a Canadian artist, illustrator, and writer who uses the names Richard A. Jacobson and Rick Jacobson professionally.

== Background ==
Jacobson was born in Nipawin, Saskatchewan, and is a graduate of the Alberta College of Art (with Honours), where he met his future wife (now divorced), and co-illustrator Laura Fernandez. He works as an illustrator, painter, and writer.

== Career ==
Partnered with Laura Fernandez, Jacobson has produced major commercial illustration and design work for Microsoft, Coca-Cola, and Air Canada. His painting for the cover of Christopher Ondaatje's book "Sindh Revisited" is now in the private collection of the Royal Geographical Society Collection. In addition to commercial design work, Jacobson has co-illustrated 19 children's books with Fernandez, and received several awards and nominations.

Jacobson was the co-recipient of the Ruth Schwartz Award for "Jeremiah Learns to Read (Scholastic). He was also the co-recipient of the 2001 Amelia Frances Howard-Gibbon Illustrator's Award for "The Magnificent Piano Recital" (Orca Books).

In 2004, Jacobson authored and co-illustrated his first full publication, "Picasso: Soul on Fire" (Tundra), on the life of the famous painter's life landmarks. The book was shortlisted for the 2005 Amelia Frances Howard-Gibbon Illustrator's Award, and listed by The Globe and Mail on the list of "Ten terrific tomes, tots to teens" list.

Jacobson followed "Picasso: Soul On Fire" with "The Mona Lisa Caper" (Tundra) in 2005 and is working on his fourth publication.

Jacobson has contributed illustrations to Smithsonian, Applied Arts, and Artist's magazines.

== Published books ==
As writer

- Picasso: Soul on Fire (Tundra Books, 2004)
- The Mona Lisa Caper (Tundra, 2005)
- The Master's Apprentice (Tundra, 2008)
- A Single Round (Deadcat Studio, 2020)
- A Lead Pill (Deadcat Studio, 2021)
- Hard Place (Deadcat Studio, 2021)
- Hard Place: Crossroads edition (Deadcat Studio, 2022)
- A Cold Hand (Deadcat Studio, 2022)

=== As illustrator only ===
Jacobson and Laura Fernandez

- Nancy Hundal, I Heard My Mother Call My Name, Harper Collins (New York, NY), 1994.
- Esther Kalman, Tchaikovsky Discovers America, Lester Publishing (Toronto, Ontario, Canada), 1994, Orchard (New York, NY), 1995.
- Jo Ellen Bogart, Jeremiah Learns to Read, Scholastic Canada (Markham, Ontario, Canada), 1997, Orchard (New York, NY), 1999.
- Norah McClintock, Sins of the Father, Scholastic Canada (Toronto, Ontario, Canada), 1997.
- Michael Bedard, Glass Town, Atheneum (New York, NY), 1997.
- Maxine Trottier, Prairie Willow, Stoddart Kids (New York, NY), 1998.
- L.M. Montgomery, Anne of Green Gables, foreword by Kate Macdonald Butler, Tundra (Plattsburgh, NY), 2000.
- Maxine Trottier, Little Dog Moon, Stoddart Kids (New York, NY), 2000.
- Marilynn Reynolds, The Magnificent Piano Recital, Stoddart Kids (Toronto, Ontario, Canada), 2000, Orca (Custer, WA), 2001.
- Rukhasana Khan, King of the Skies, North Winds Press (Markham, Ontario, Canada), 2001.
- Douglas Cowling, Vivaldi's Ring of Mystery, North Winds Press (Markham, Ontario, Canada), 2004.

Jacobson alone

- Original Thoughts from the Enterprising Mind of Cheryl Lousley, Gordon Suavé, Cheryl Lousley, Reigad Wai (Toronto: Storybook, 1989)
- Crime in 2001: Original Thoughts from the Enterprising Mind of David Strobel, David Strobel (Storybook, 1989)
- Diary of an Alien: Original Thoughts from the Enterprising Mind of Benjamin Evans, Gordon Suavé, Benjamin Evans (Storybook, 1989)
