= The White Cat and the Monk =

Children's picture book by Jo Ellen Bogart and Sydney Smith

- Author: Jo Ellen Bogart
- Illustrator: Sydney Smith
- Language: English
- Genre: Children's picture book
- Published: 2016 (Groundwood Books)
- Publication place: Canada
- Media type: Print (hardback)
- Pages: (unpaginated)
- ISBN: 9781554987801
- OCLC: 1004882337

The White Cat and the Monk: A Retelling of the Poem "Pangur Bán" is a 2016 children's picture book by Jo Ellen Bogart and illustrated by Sydney Smith. An adaption of an anonymous ninth century poem, it is about the friendship between Pangur, a cat and a monk, told over the course of one night, and the fulfillment they both receive by morning.

== Reception ==
A review in Quill & Quire of The White Cat and the Monk wrote "If ever there was a book that could calm a child and draw her into meditative contemplation (perhaps right before bed?), The White Cat and the Monk is it.", and School Library Journal described it as "A stunningly illustrated meditative ode to the simple joys of human-animal companionship and the pursuit of knowledge."

The White Cat and the Monk has also been reviewed by Kirkus Reviews, Publishers Weekly, Booklist, Horn Book Guides The New York Times, CBC Books, and CM: Canadian Review of Materials,

== Awards ==
- 2017 CCBC Choices book
- 2017 NCTE Notable Poetry Book
- 2017 North Somerset Teachers' Book Award longlisted book.
- 2016 Governor General's Literary Awards, Young People's Literature – Illustrated Books short list
- 2016 NP99 Best Book
- 2016 New York Times Book Review Best Illustrated Children's Book.

== See also ==
- The Secret of Kells
