= Jo Ellen Bogart =

American writer

Jo Ellen Bogart (born October 20, 1945) is a US and Canadian writer of children's books living in Guelph, Ontario.

The daughter of a telephone company manager, the oldest of four children, she was born in Houston and grew up there, in San Antonio and in Dallas. Bogart received degrees in education and psychology from the University of Texas at Austin. She came to Canada in 1975, becoming a Canadian citizen in 1995 but retaining her US citizenship.

She married Jim Bogart, who was born in Toronto but was studying in Texas. The couple spent four years in Louisiana before her husband took a position at the University of Guelph. She worked as a substitute teacher for several years.

Many of her books have been included on the Canadian Children's Book Centre's Our Choice lists.

In 2016, she was a finalist for the Governor General's Award for English-language Young People's Literature - Illustrated Books for The White Cat and the Monk.

Bogart provided the lyrics for six songs on the Eddie Douglas recording for children Gonna Keep Dancing, which was nominated for a Juno Award.

== Selected works ==
Sources:

- Malcolm's Runaway Soap (1988) illustrated by Linda Hendry
- Dylan’s Lullaby (1988) illustrated by Cheryl Lowrey
- Daniel's Dog (1990) illustrated by Janet Wilson
- Gifts (1994) illustrated by Barbara Reid
- Jeremiah Learns to Read (1997) illustrated by Laura Fernandez and Rick Jacobson, received the Ruth and Sylvia Schwartz Children's Book Award and a Tiny Torgi Print Braille Book Award
- Dogs and Dog Care (1999) Coles Notes series
- Capturing Joy, the Story of Maud Lewis (2002) illustrated by Mark Lang
- Emily Carr: At the Edge of the World (2004) illustrated by Maxwell Newhouse, named the Children’s Literature Roundtables of Canada Information Book Award Honour Book
- Big and Small, Room for All (2009), finalist for a Lane Anderson Award in the category Science for Young Readers
- The White Cat and the Monk (2016) illustrated by Sydney Smith, based on an Old Irish poem "Pangur Bán", finalist for a Governor General's Award
