= Jordan Scott (poet) =

Canadian poet

Jordan Scott (born May 8, 1978) is a Canadian poet, who won the Latner Writers' Trust Poetry Prize in 2018.

Scott's first book of poetry, Silt, was published in 2005, and was shortlisted for the Dorothy Livesay Poetry Prize in 2006. He followed up in 2008 with Blert, a collection of poetry inspired by his lifelong struggle with stuttering.

In 2013, Scott and Stephen Collis collaborated on Decomp, a book which combined prose poetry with photography. In 2015, he was granted access to the Guantanamo Bay detention camp, spending five days exploring the facility and publishing the multimedia work Clearance Process in 2016 to document his visit.

His 2020 children's book, I Talk Like a River, was named as Best Children's Book of the Year Award for 2020 by Publishers Weekly, and was a finalist for both the Christie Harris Illustrated Children's Literature Prize and the Governor General's Award for English-language Young People's Literature - Illustrated Books.

== Works ==
- Silt (2005)
- Blert (2008)
- Decomp (2013)
- Clearance Process (2016)
- Night & Ox (2017)
- I Talk Like a River (2020) illustrated by Sydney Smith
  - German: Ich bin wie der Fluss (2021)
- My Baba's garden (2023) illustrated by Sydney Smith
