= Islam and cats =

Islamic perspectives on the domestic cat

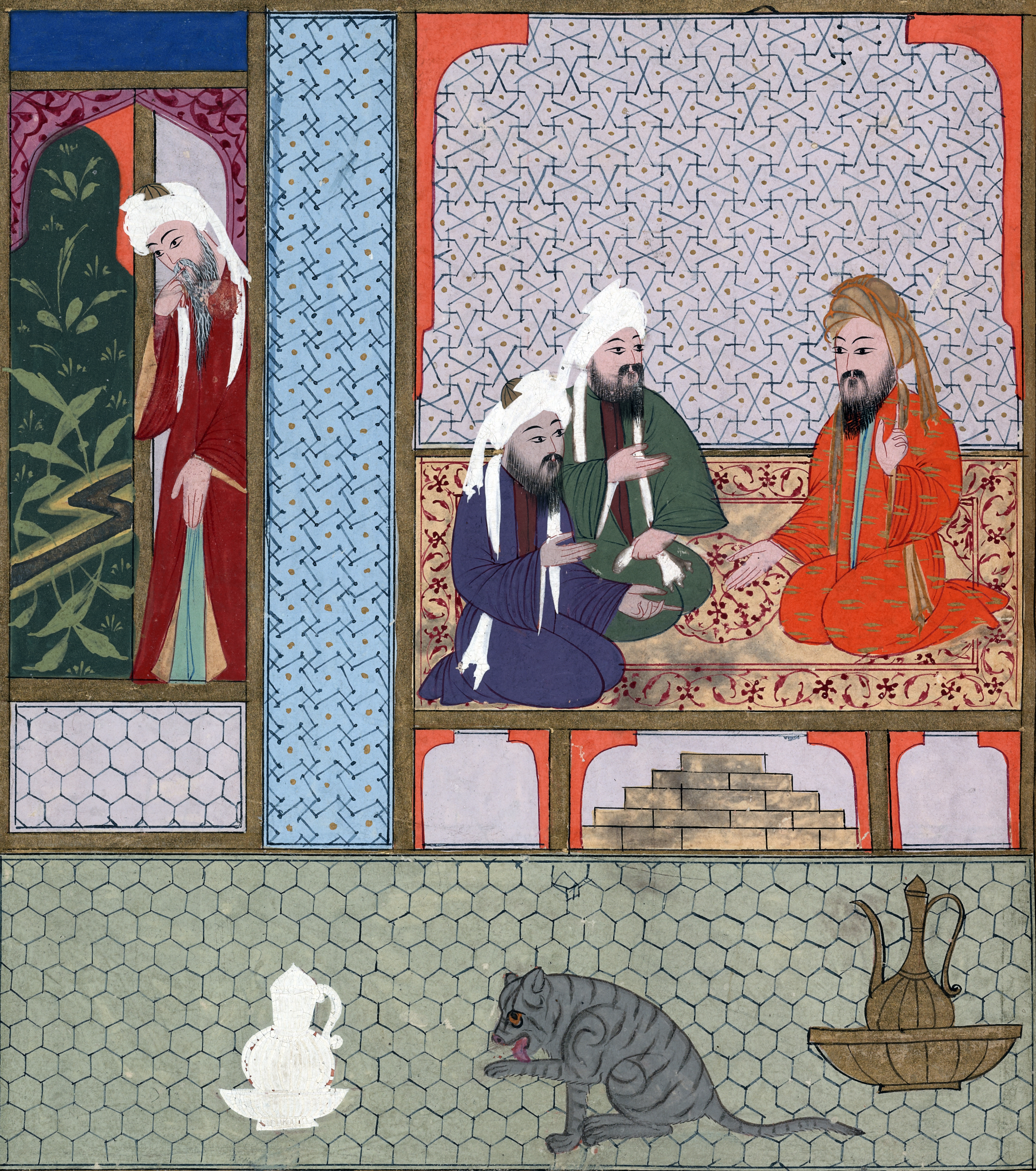
Islamic miniature depicting Abu Hudhayfa ibn Utba (right) informing As'ad ibn Zurara that he has converted to Islam, with the presence of a cat denoting his home's ritual purity.

In Islam, the domestic cat is regarded as ritually clean and thus holds a unique status in comparison to other companion animals, such as the domestic dog. Under Islamic law, cats are permitted to be kept by Muslims within their homes and other private and public spaces, including mosques. Likewise, if a person's food or drink is sampled by a cat, it is not rendered impure or unfit for consumption, and water from which a cat has drunk is permissible to use for ablution.

Cats are believed by Muslims to possess barakah, which refers to a blessing power that is said to flow through those who are spiritually closest to God. As such, they are widely acclaimed as the "quintessential pet" for a Muslim household. A story that tells of Muhammad, the Islamic prophet, owning a pet cat himself is also popular in some parts of the Muslim world, although it is generally considered to be untrue because it is not verifiably attributed to accounts of his lifetime.

Human interaction with cats dates back to the domestication of the cat more than 10,000 years ago. Cats have been the subject of admiration by many civilizations due to their various qualities and behaviours, and they are often humanized as pets. They are one of the most common companion animals around the world and are thought to be the single most common companion animal among the global Muslim community.

== History ==
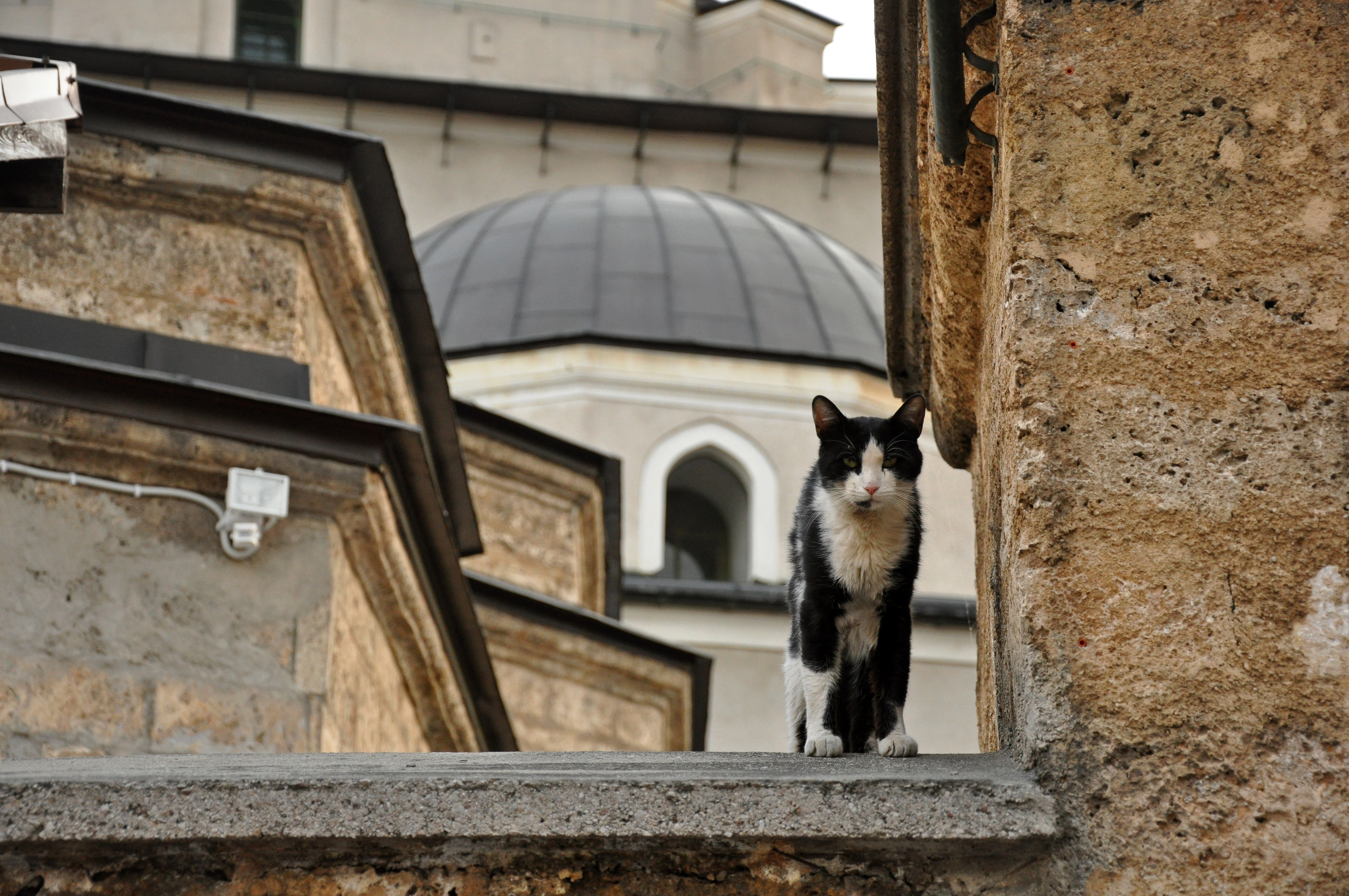
Feral cat in the courtyard of Gazi Husrev-beg Mosque in Sarajevo, 2011

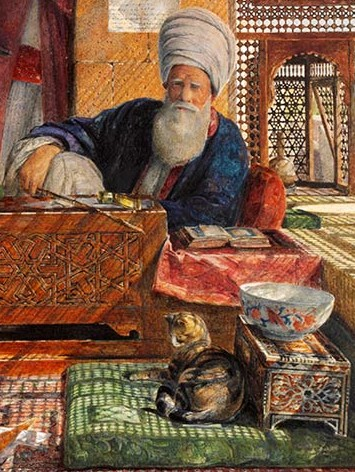
Painting of a cat resting on a pillow next to a Muslim scholar in Cairo, by John Frederick Lewis (1805–1876)

The American poet and travel author Bayard Taylor (1825–1878) was astonished when he discovered a Syrian hospital where cats roamed freely. The institution, in which domestic felines were sheltered and nourished, was funded by an Islamic charity, along with caretakers' wages, veterinary care, and cat food. Edward William Lane (1801–1876), a British Orientalist who resided in Cairo, described a cat garden originally endowed by the 13th-century Egyptian sultan Baybars.

British writer Wilfred Thesiger, in his 1964 book The Marsh Arabs, notes that cats were allowed free entry to community buildings in villages in the Mesopotamian Marshes and were even fed. Aside from protecting granaries and food stores from pests, cats were valued by the paper-based Arab and Muslim cultures for preying on mice, who frequently destroyed books. For that reason, cats are often depicted in paintings alongside Muslim scholars and bibliophiles.

== Guidelines of Islamic law ==
=== Classification and permissibility ===
Cats are permitted to roam freely in all private and public spaces, including Islamic holy sites. Food and drink that is halal (permissible for a Muslim to consume per Islamic dietary laws) remains halal and does not become najis (impure) if it happens to also be consumed by a cat, and this principle similarly applies to water that is intended for use in ablution.

Although the cat is technically not classified as a ritually unclean animal, it is not permissible to use it as a source of food because it is an obligate carnivore and therefore predatory, which renders it haram (strictly forbidden) for consumption. Cat meat is uncommon in most of the world outside of incidents during famine or total war.

=== Neutering and population control ===
Muslim scholars are generally divided on the issue of neutering, which is a common practice with many companion animals around the world, including cats. Most, however, maintain that neutering cats is allowed "if there is some benefit in neutering the cat and if that will not cause its death".

Per the opinion of Saudi Arabian cleric al-Uthaymin (1929–2001):

If there are too many cats and they are a nuisance, and if the operation will not harm them, then there is nothing wrong with it, because this is better than killing them after they have been created. But if the cats are ordinary cats and are not causing a nuisance, perhaps it is better to leave them alone to reproduce.

== Alleged pet cat of the Islamic prophet Muhammad ==
According to one story, Muhammad had a cat named Muʿizza (Arabic: معزة), whom he found one day to have fallen asleep on his robe while he was preparing for prayer, so he cut the sleeve off to avoid disturbing her.

However, no such pet cat is mentioned as belonging to Muhammad in any verified hadith (an account of Muhammad's sayings or actions), which has led many Muslims to consider this story untrue. Cats are mentioned in general narratives addressing human conduct with animals in the context of warning against abusing or neglecting them.

== See also ==
- Animals in Islam
  - Feral cats in Istanbul
- Cultural depictions of cats
- Human interaction with cats
  - Moral status of animals in the ancient world
