= Sydney Smith (illustrator) =

Canadian illustrator of children's books

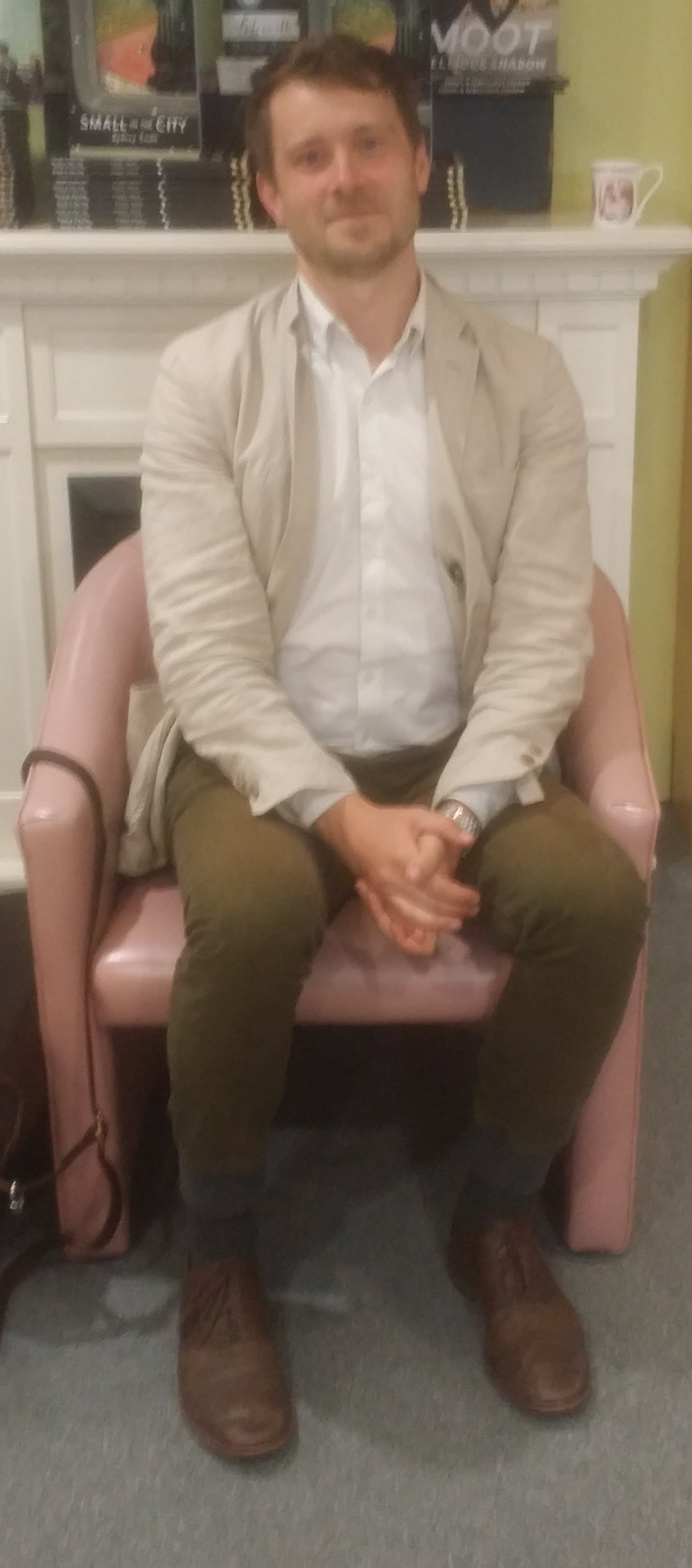
- Born: Canada
- Notable work: Sidewalk Flowers; Town Is by the Sea; Small in the City
- Awards: Governor General's Award 2015; CILIP Kate Greenaway Medal 2018, 2021; Hans Christian Andersen award 2024

Sydney Smith is a Canadian illustrator of children's books. He is the 2024 recipient of the Hans Christian Andersen Award for his "lasting contribution to children's literature". He earlier won the 2015 Governor General's Award for English-language children's illustration for Sidewalk Flowers, a wordless picture book which he illustrated with author JonArno Lawson. He currently resides in Halifax, Nova Scotia.

== Education ==
Smith studied drawing and printmaking at NSCAD University in Halifax, Nova Scotia. It was while studying there that he realized his interest for illustrating children's books.

== Career ==
Most of his work is illustrations for other authors. Smith's first three assignments were for re-issues of books by Sheree Fitch. To date he has authored and illustrated two titles, 2019's Small in the City and 2023's Do You Remember? He has worked for two different publishing houses in his career as an illustrator: Nimbus Publishing and Groundwood Books. In addition to his work as an illustrator and author, Smith has also done graphic design work for Canadian musical acts Hey Rosetta! and Old Man Luedecke.

=== Published works ===
- 2010: Mabel Murple by Sheree Fitch
- 2011: There Were Monkeys In My Kitchen by Sheree Fitch
- 2012: Toes In My Nose: And Other Poems by Sheree Fitch
- 2014: Jewel of the Thames (A Portia Adams Adventure Book 1) by Angela Misri
- 2014: Music Is For Everyone by Jill Barber
- 2015: Grant and Tillie Go Walking by Monica Kulling
- 2015: Sidewalk Flowers by JonArno Lawson
- 2016: Look Out for the Fitzgerald-Trouts by Esta Spalding
- 2016: The White Cat and the Monk: A Retelling of the Poem "Pangur Bán" by Jo Ellen Bogart
- 2017: Town Is by the Sea by Joanne Schwartz
- 2019: Small in the City by Sydney Smith
- 2020: I Talk Like a River by Jordan Scott
- 2023: Do You Remember? by Sydney Smith
- 2023: My Baba's Garden by Jordan Scott
- 2026: Rebecca by Kate Beaton

== Awards and recognition ==
Year	Award	Book	Result
2015	Lillian Shepherd Memorial Award for Excellence in Illustration	Music Is For Everyone	Won
2015	Governor General's Award for English-language children's illustration	Sidewalk Flowers	Won
2015	Prix Libbylit for Best Picture Book (Belgium)	Sidewalk Flowers	Won
2015	New York Times Best Illustrated Children's Book of the Year	Sidewalk Flowers	Won
2015	Publishers Weekly Best Books of the Year	Sidewalk Flowers	Won
2015	Goodreads Choice Awards Best Picture Books	Sidewalk Flowers	Nominated
2016	Amelia Frances Howard-Gibbon Illustrator's Award	Sidewalk Flowers	Won
2018	CILIP Kate Greenaway Medal	Town Is by the Sea	Won
2018	TD Canadian Children's Literature Award	Town Is by the Sea	Won
2021	Kate Greenaway Medal	Small in the City	Won
2024	Hans Christian Andersen Award		Won
2024	Governor General's Award for Young People’s Literature — Illustrated Books	Do You Remember?	Pending
