= Reichenau Primer =

9th-century Irish manuscript

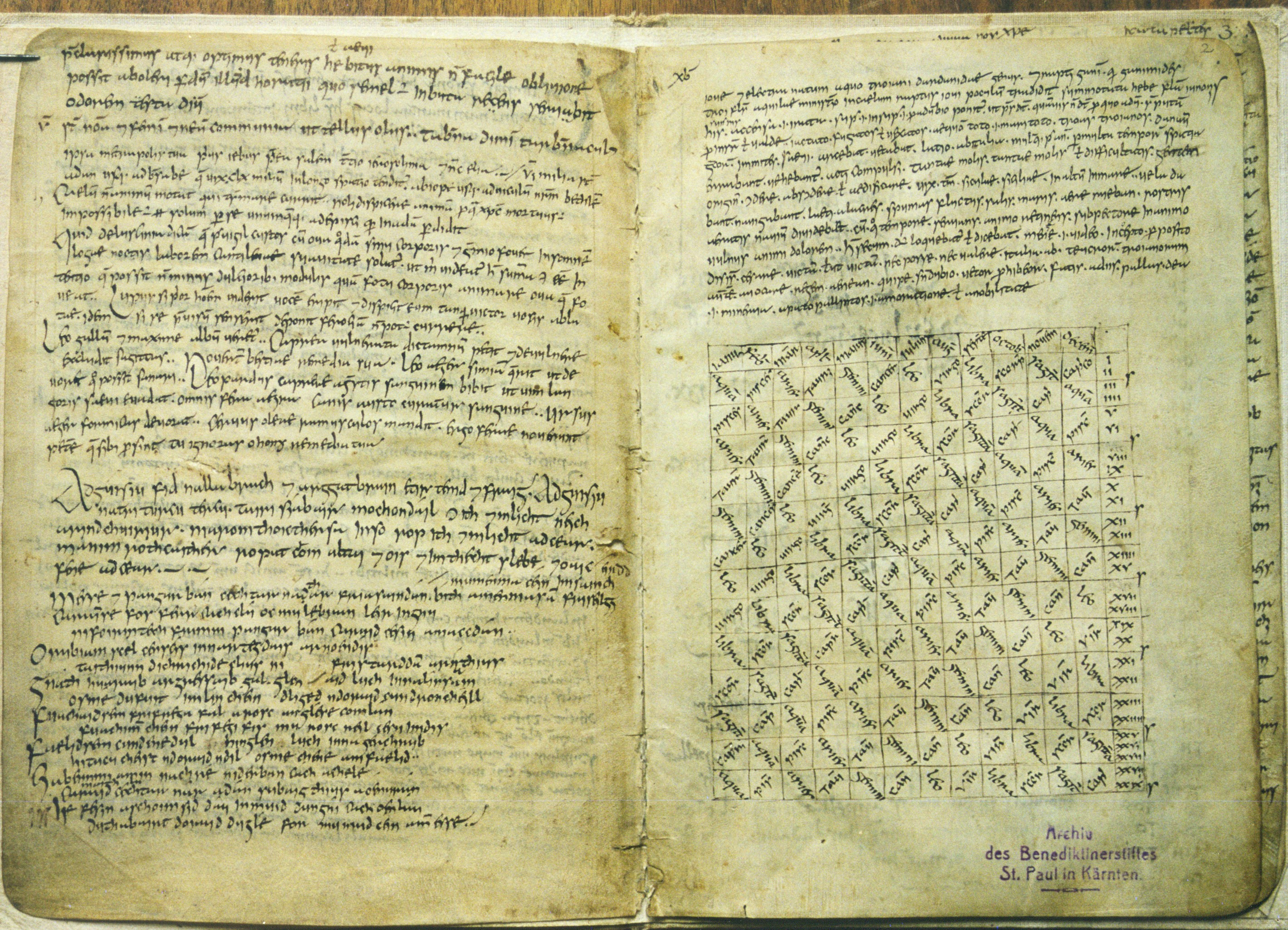
A page of Reichenau Primer, showing the poem Pangur Bán.

The Reichenau Primer (Reichenauer Schulheft) is an early 9th-century manuscript of 8 folia kept in the St. Paul abbey library in Lavanttal, Carinthia (Stift St. Paul Cod. 86a/1), (a ninth leaf is kept separately in Karlsruhe), probably written in Reichenau Abbey or St. Gallen Abbey, but possibly elsewhere in the wider region, brought to Reichenau at a later date. It came to St. Blasien in the 18th century.

The content is in insular script, apparently scribal practice by an Irish monk. It contains mainly Latin hymns and grammatical texts, with added glosses in Old High German, but also Greek declension tables, astronomical tables and notably Old Irish poems, among them Pangur Bán.
