= Duetto buffo di due gatti =

Humorous performance piece for two sopranos

The "Duetto buffo di due gatti" (humorous duet for two cats) is a performance piece for two sopranos and piano. Often performed as a comical concert encore, it consists entirely of the repeated word miau ("meow") sung by the singers. It is sometimes performed by a soprano and a tenor, or a soprano and a bass.

While the piece is typically attributed to Gioachino Rossini, it was not actually written by him, but is instead a compilation written in 1825 that draws principally on Rossini's 1816 opera Otello. Hubert Hunt claims that the compiler was Robert Lucas Pearsall, who for this purpose adopted the pseudonym "G. Berthold".

== Structure ==
In order of appearance, the piece consists of:

- the "Katte-Cavatine" by the Danish composer C. E. F. Weyse.
- part of the duet "No, non temer, serena" for Rodrigo and Iago in act 1 of Otello, there belonging to the words "Se uniti negli affanni noi fummo un tempo insieme" etc.
- part of the cabaletta to the aria "Ah, come mai non senti", sung by Rodrigo in the second act of the same opera.

== See also ==
- "Duo miaulé" in L'enfant et les sortilèges
- Duett: "Nun, liebes Weibchen ... Miau! Miau!" (Lubano, Lubanara), in Der Stein der Weisen (Wolfgang Amadeus Mozart et al.)
