= Pangur Bán =

9th century Irish poem

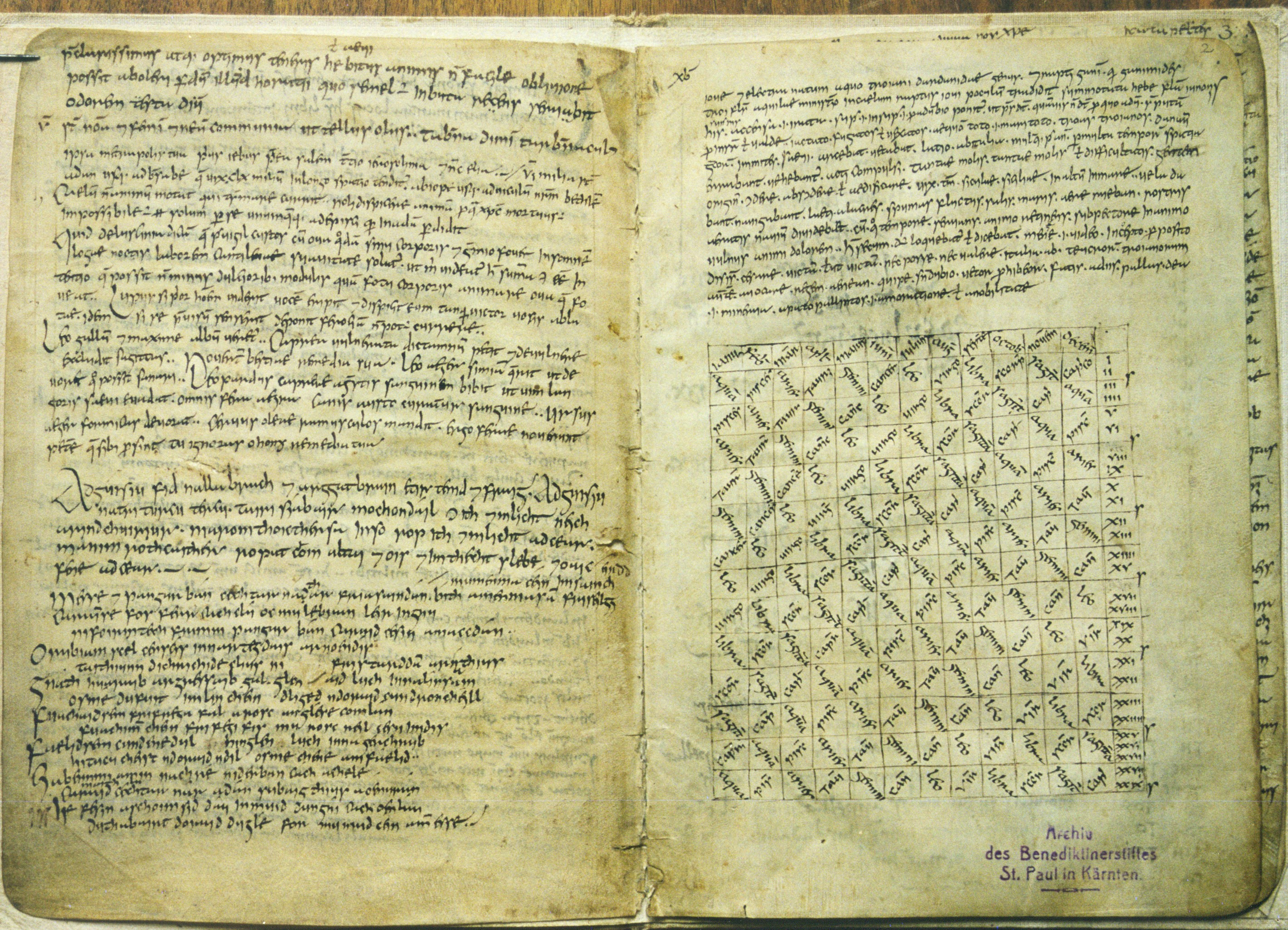
The page of the Reichenau Primer on which Pangur Bán is written

"Pangur Bán" is an Old Irish poem written in about the 9th century at or near Reichenau Abbey, in what is now Germany, by an Irish monk about his cat. Pangur Bán, meaning "White Pangur", is the cat's name. Although the poem is anonymous, it bears similarities to the poetry of Sedulius Scottus, prompting speculation that he is the author. In eight verses of four lines each, the author compares the cat's happy hunting with his own scholarly pursuits.

The poem is preserved in the Reichenau Primer (Stift St. Paul Cod. 86b/1 fol 1v) and now kept in St. Paul's Abbey in the Lavanttal.

== Background ==
The poem is found in only one manuscript, the Reichenauer Schulheft or Reichenau Primer. The primer appears to be the notebook of an Irish monk based in Reichenau Abbey. The contents of the primer are diverse. It also contains "notes from a commentary of the Aeneid, some hymns, a brief glossary of Greek words, some Greek declension, notes on biblical places, a tract on the nature of angels, and some astronomy".

== Name ==
Pangur is not an Old Irish word, and Professor W. J. Gruffydd proposes that Pangur represents an old spelling of the Welsh word pannwr, meaning "a fuller". "The cat was white: fullers are white by reason of the fuller's earth used by them."

== Poem ==
Gerard Murphy describes the poem's form:

The metre is deibide (seven syllables in each line with an unstressed final syllable in b rhyming with a stressed final syllable in a, and an unstressed final syllable in d with a stressed final syllable in c). Alliteration is frequent.

Original Old Irish version	English Translation by Robin Flower (1912, The Poem-Book of the Gael)
1. Messe ocus Pangur Bán, cechtar nathar fria saindan bíth a menmasam fri seilgg mu menma céin im saincheirdd.: 2. Caraimse fos ferr cach clú; oc mu lebran leir ingnu ni foirmtech frimm Pangur Bán caraid cesin a maccdán.: 3. Orubiam scél cen scís; innar tegdais ar noendís taithiunn dichrichide clius ni fristarddam arnáthius.: 4. Gnáth huaraib ar gressaib gal; glenaid luch inna línsam os mé dufuit im lín chéin dliged ndoraid cu ndronchéill.: 5. Fuachaidsem fri frega fál; a rosc anglése comlán fuachimm chein fri fegi fis mu rosc reil cesu imdis.: 6. Faelidsem cu ndene dul; hinglen luch inna gerchrub hi tucu cheist ndoraid ndil os me chene am faelid.: 7. Cia beimmi amin nach ré, ni derban cách a chele maith la cechtar nár a dán, subaigthius a óenurán.: 8. He fesin as choimsid dáu; in muid dungní cach oenláu du thabairt doraid du glé for mu mud cein am messe.	1. I and Pangur Bán, my cat, 'Tis a like task we are at; Hunting mice is his delight, Hunting words I sit all night.: 2. Better far than praise of men; 'Tis to sit with book and pen; Pangur bears me no ill-will, He, too, plies his simple skill.: 3. 'Tis a merry thing to see; At our tasks how glad are we, When at home we sit and find Entertainment to our mind.: 4. Oftentimes a mouse will stray; In the hero Pangur's way; Oftentimes my keen thought set Takes a meaning in its net.: 5. 'Gainst the wall he sets his eye; Full and fierce and sharp and sly; 'Gainst the wall of knowledge I All my little wisdom try.: 6. When a mouse darts from its den, O! how glad is Pangur then; O! what gladness do I prove When I solve the doubts I love.: 7. So in peace our task we ply, Pangur Bán, my cat, and I; In our arts we find our bliss, I have mine, and he has his.: 8. Practice every day has made; Pangur perfect in his trade; I get wisdom day and night, Turning darkness into light.

== Modern use ==
A critical edition of the poem was published in 1903 by Whitley Stokes and John Strachan in the second volume of the Thesaurus Palaeohibernicus. Among modern writers to have translated the poem are Robin Flower, W. H. Auden, Seamus Heaney, Paul Muldoon and Eavan Boland. In Auden's translation, the poem was set by Samuel Barber as the eighth of his ten Hermit Songs (1952–53).

Fay Sampson wrote a series of books based on the poem. They follow the adventures of Pangur Bán, Niall the monk (his friend) and Finnglas (a Welsh princess).

In the 2009 animated movie The Secret of Kells, which is heavily inspired by Irish mythology, one of the supporting characters is a white cat named Pangur Bán who arrives in the company of a monk. A paraphrase of the poem in modern Irish is read out during the credits by actor and Irish speaker Mick Lally.

Irish-language singer Pádraigín Ní Uallacháin recorded the poem in her 2011 studio album Songs of the Scribe, featuring 2 verses from the original text and the whole translation by Nobel laureate Seamus Heaney. The poem was read by Tomás Ó Cathasaigh (first in Irish, then in Heaney's English translation) at the memorial service held for Heaney at the Memorial Church of Harvard University on 7 November 2013.

In 2016, Jo Ellen Bogart and Sydney Smith published a picture book based on the poem called The White Cat and the Monk.

In 2018, Eddi Reader adapted the words in "Pangur Bán And The Primrose Lass" on her album Cavalier.

Dutch band Twigs & Twine used parts of the poem in their song "Messe ocus Pangur Bán".

In 2022, Irish writer Colm Tóibín published his own version of the poem in a collection titled Vinegar Hill.

First described in 2022, Pangurban, a genus of nimravid from Eocene California, is named for the cat in the poem.

== See also ==
- Early Irish literature
- The Secret of Kells
- List of individual cats
