= Laura Fernandez (musician) =

Canadian illustrator, musician, and realtor

- Born: Laura Maria Fernandez; 1960 (age 65–66); Madrid, Spain
- Education: Alberta University of the Arts
- Occupations: Musician, artist, broadcaster

Laura Maria Fernandez (born 20 May 1960) is a Canadian singer-songwriter, pianist, music producer, artist, radio host, and real estate agent. Fernandez was born in Madrid, Spain. In 2003, she was named Best Soft Rock musician at the New York International Independent Music Festival. She hosts Café Latino on JazzFM91 (formerly CJRT), Toronto, and her Latin-music was produced by Billy Bryans.

== Early life ==
Fernandez was born in Madrid, Spain. She moved from Madrid to Switzerland and then to Calgary, Alberta, Canada, with her family. Her father was an engineer, writer and a painter. In grade 7 she studied piano at The Royal Conservatory of Music.

She graduated from the Alberta College of Art and Design with Honours (1983). She met artist Rick Jacobson while in college. They married and moved to Toronto, Ontario. They started their own business: Jacobson Fernandez Illustration.

== Visual arts ==
Fernandez painted the Maple leaf logo for Air Canada. Fernandez also created the painted trillium used on the Ontario Driver's License.

Fernandez has done illustrations for children's book like Jeremiah Learns to Read, Picasso Soul On Fire, Anne of Green Gables, and The Magnificent Piano Recital. She has also produced work for Margaret Atwood, Robertson Davies, Richard Francis Burton, Bill Gates, Sr., David Thomson, and Christopher Ondaatje.

Fernandez has won awards with Rick Jacobson, including the Toronto Art Director's Awards, Communication Arts Magazine's Award of Excellence, the Ruth Schwartz Award, and the Amelia Frances Howard-Gibbon Illustrator's Award gold medal for illustration from the Canadian Library Association for the Magnificent Piano Recital in 2001.

== Music career ==
Fernandez started song writing when she was 12, writing in Spanish. She won the Soft Rock Award at the International Independent Music Festival in 2003. She released her first album, The Other Side, in 2003. She hosted an open mic night from 2003 to 2008.

In 2008, Fernandez started as radio host for Cafe Latino on JazzFM91. She released a Latin music album in 2010 called Un Solo Beso, which was produced by Billy Bryans. In 2020 Laura Fernandez released a collection of 13 songs titled Okay, Alright, which she co-produced with Grammy award-winning producer and mastering engineer Peter J Moore. She continues to perform live.

Fernandez is sponsored by Steinway & Sons. She is one of 19 Canadian musicians sponsored by Steinway.

== Real estate ==
Fernandez has been selling real estate since 2007. She received the Diamond Award for Excellence in Real Estate.

== Discography ==
- 2003 – The Other Side (Independent)
- 2010 – Un Solo Beso (Independent)
- 2020 – Okay, Alright
