= Ruth & Sylvia Schwartz Children's Book Awards =

Canadian children's book award

- Awarded for: Children's literature
- Country: Canada
- Presented by: Ontario Arts Foundation and Ontario Arts Council
- Reward: CA$6,000
- First award: 1976

Highlights
- Most wins: Kenneth Oppel
- Website: https://oafdn.ca/programs/awards/ruth-sylvia-schwartz-childrens-book-awards/

The Ruth & Sylvia Schwartz Children's Book Awards, established in 1976 as the Ruth Schwartz Children's Book Awards, is a Canadian literary award for children's books. From 1976 until 1993, a single award was presented annually. Beginning in 1994, two awards were presented: one for children's picture book (C) and one for young adult and middle-grade novel (YA/MG). In 2008, the prize increased from CA$5,000 to CA$6,000.

The award was established by Sylvia Schwartz in honour of her sister, Ruth, a Toronto bookseller. The award was renamed in 2004 to honour both Ruth and Sylvia. Recipients are nominated by a committee consisting of a bookseller, a librarian and a children's book reviewer, with winners selected among the nominees by juries of young readers from an Ontario public school. The Ontario Arts Foundation and the Ontario Arts Council facilitate award administration.

== Recipients ==
=== 1976-1999 ===
Award winners and finalists
Year	Category	Author	Title	Publisher	Result	Ref.
1976	N/A	Mordecai Richler	Jacob Two-Two Meets the Hooded Fang	McClelland & Stewart	Winner	
1977	N/A	Robert Thomas Allen	The Violin	McGraw-Hill Ryerson	Winner	
1978	N/A	Dennis Lee, illus. by Frank Newfield	Garbage Delight	MacMillan	Winner	
1979	N/A	Kevin Major	Hold Fast	Stoddart	Winner	
1980	N/A	Barbara Smucker	Days of Terror	Penguin Books Canada	Winner	
1981	N/A	Suzanne Martel	The King's Daughter	Groundwood Books	Winner	
1982	N/A	Claire Mackay, illus. by Marsha Hewitt	One Proud Summer	Women's Press	Winner	
1983	N/A	Jan Truss	Jasmin	Groundwood Books	Winner	
1984	N/A	Tim Wynne-Jones, illus. by Ken Nutt	Zoom at Sea	Groundwood Books	Winner	
1985	N/A	Jean Little	Mama's Going to Buy You a Mockingbird	Penguin Books Canada	Winner	
1986	N/A	Robert Munsch, illus. by Michael Martchenko	Thomas' Snowsuit	Annick Press	Winner	
1987	N/A	Barbara Reid	Have You Seen Birds?	Scholastic Canada .	Winner	
1988	N/A	Cora Taylor	The Doll	Western Producer	Winner	
1989	N/A	Janet Lunn, illus. by Kim LaFave	Amos's Sweater	Groundwood Books	Winner	
1990	N/A	Diana Wieler	Bad Boy	Groundwood Books	Winner	
1991	N/A	William Bell	Forbidden City	Doubleday	Winner	
1992	N/A	Paul Yee, illus. by Harvey Chan	Roses Sing on New Snow	Groundwood Books	Winner	
1993	N/A	Phoebe Gilman	Something from Nothing	Doubleday	Winner	
1994	C	Michael Kusugak, illus. by Vladyana Kyrkorka	Northern Lights: The Soccer Trails	Annick Press	Winner	
1994	YA/MG	O. R. Mellin	The Hunter's Moon	HarperCollins Canada	Winner	
1995	C	Barbara Greenwood, illus. by Heather Collins	A Pioneer Story	Kids Can Press .	Winner	
1995	YA/MG	Julie Johnston	Adam and Eve and Pinch-Me	Lester Publishing	Winner	
1996	C	Geoff Butler	The Killick: A Newfoundland Story	Tundra Books	Winner	
1996	YA/MG	Welwyn Wilton Katz	Out of the Dark	Groundwood Books	Winner	
1997	C	Paul Yee, illus. by Harvey Chan	Ghost Train	Groundwood Books	Winner	
1997	YA/MG	Kit Pearson	Awake and Dreaming	Penguin Books Canada	Winner	
1998	C	Jo Ellen Bogart, illus. by Laura Fernandez and Rick Jacobson	Jeremiah Learns to Read	Scholastic Canada .	Winner	
1998	YA/MG	Martha Brooks	Bone Dance	Groundwood Books	Winner	
1999	C	Celia Barker Lottridge, illus. by Harvey Chan	Music for the Tsar of the Sea	Groundwood Books	Winner	
1999	YA/MG	Eric Walters	War of the Eagles	Orca Book Publishers	Winner	

=== 2000s ===
Award winners and finalists
Year	Category	Author	Title	Publisher	Result	Ref.
2000	C	Marie-Louise Gay	Stella, Star of the Sea	Groundwood Books	Winner	
2000	YA/MG	Kenneth Oppel	Sunwing	HarperCollins Canada	Winner	
2001	C	Stephanie Simpson McLellan, illus. by Sean Cassidy	The Chicken Cat	Fitzhenry & Whiteside .	Winner	
2001	YA/MG	Janet McNaughton	The Secret Under My Skin	HarperCollins Canada	Winner	
2002	C	Paulette Bourgeois, illus. by Stéphane Jorisch	Oma's Quilt	Kids Can Press .	Winner	
2002	YA/MG	Mary C. Sheppard	Seven for a Secret	Groundwood Books	Winner	
2003	C	Richard Thomson, illus. by Martin Springett	The Night Walker	Fitzhenry & Whiteside	Winner	
2003	YA/MG	Deborah Ellis	Parvana's Journey	Groundwood Books	Winner	
2004	C	Barbara Reid	The Subway Mouse	North Winds Press / Scholastic Canada	Winner	
2004	YA/MG	Brian Doyle	Boy O'Boy	Groundwood Books	Winner	
2005	C	Wallace Edwards	Monkey Business	Kids Can Press	Winner	
2005	YA/MG	Kenneth Oppel	Airborn	HarperCollins Canada	Winner	
2006	C	Marie-Louise Gay	Caramba	Groundwood Books	Winner	
2006	YA/MG	Kenneth Oppel	Skybreaker	HarperCollins Canada	Winner	
2007	C	Mélanie Watt	Scaredy Squirrel	Kids Can Press	Winner	
2007	YA/MG	Deborah Ellis	I Am A Taxi	Groundwood Books	Winner	
2008	C	Duncan Weller	The Boy from the Sun	Sim 1 Read Books	Winner	
2008	C	Bill Richardson, illus. by Cynthia Nugent	The Aunts Come Marching		Finalist	
2008	C	Jeremy Tankard	Grumpy Bird		Finalist	
2008	C	Wallace Edwards	The Painted Circus: P.T. Vermin Presents a Mesmerizing Menagerie of Trickery and Illusion Guaranteed to Beguile and Bamboozle the Beholder		Finalist	
2008	C	Mélanie Watt	Scaredy Squirrel Makes a Friend		Finalist	
2008	YA/MG	Kenneth Oppel	Darkwing	HarperCollins Canada	Winner	
2008	YA/MG	Jean Little	Dancing Through the Snow		Finalist	
2008	YA/MG	Christopher Paul Curtis	Elijah of Buxton		Finalist	
2008	YA/MG	Kit Pearson	A Perfect Gentle Knight		Finalist	
2008	YA/MG	Tim Wynne-Jones	Rex Zero, King of Nothing		Finalist	
2009	C	Mélanie Watt	Chester's Back!	Kids Can Press	Winner	
2009	YA/MG	Alma Fullerton	Libertad	Fitzhenry & Whiteside	Winner	

=== 2010s ===
Award winners and finalists
Year	Category	Author	Title	Publisher	Result	Ref.
2010	C	Jane Barclay, illus. by Renné Benoit	Proud as a Peacock, Brave as a Lion	Tundra Books	Winner	
2010	YA/MG	Shane Peacock	Vanishing Girl: The Boy Sherlock Holmes, His Third Case	Tundra Books	Winner	
2011	C	Mélanie Watt	Chester's Masterpiece	Kids Can Press	Winner	
2011	YA/MG	Kenneth Oppel	Half-Brother	HarperColIins Canada	Winner	
2012	C	Susan Vande Griek, illus. by Karen Reczuch	Loon	House of Anansi / Groundwood Books	Winner	
2012	YA/MG	Kit Pearson	The Whole Truth	HarperColIins Canada	Winner	
2013	C	Aubrey Davis, illus. by Marie Lafrance	A Hen for Izzy Pippik	Kids Can Press	Winner	
2013	YA/MG	Susin Nielsen	The Reluctant Journal of Henry K. Larsen	Tundra Books	Winner	
2014	C	Anne Villeneuve	Loula is Leaving for Africa	Kids Can Press	Winner	
2014	C	K. Jane Watt, illus. by Richard Cole	The Boy Who Paints		Finalist	
2014	C	Kathy Stinson, illus. by Dušan Petričić	The Man with the Violin		Finalist	
2014	C	Jean E. Pendziwol, illus. by Isabelle Arsenault	Once Upon a Northern Night		Finalist	
2014	C	Marie-Louise Gay	Read Me a Story, Stella		Finalist	
2014	YA/MG	Teresa Toten	The Unlikely Hero of Room 13B	Doubleday Canada	Winner	
2014	YA/MG	Julie Johnston	Little Red Lies		Finalist	
2014	YA/MG	David Carroll	Ultra		Finalist	
2014	YA/MG	Fanny Britt, illus. by Isabelle Arsenault	Jane, the Fox and Me		Finalist	
2014	YA/MG	Erin Bow	Sorrow's Knot		Finalist	
2015	C	Kathy Kacer, illus. by Gillian Newland	The Magician of Auschwitz	Second Story Press	Winner	
2015	C	Margriet Ruurs and Katherine Gibson	A Brush Full of Colour: The World of Ted Harrison	Pajama Press	Finalist	
2015	C	Ashley Spires	The Most Magnificent Thing	Kids Can Press	Finalist	
2015	C	Cybèle Young	Nancy Knows by	Tundra Books	Finalist	
2015	C	Geneviève Côté	Starring Me and You	Kids Can Press	Finalist	
2015	YA/MG	Kenneth Oppel	The Boundless	HarperColIins Canada	Winner	
2015	YA/MG	Dan Bar-el, illus. by Tatjana Mai-Wyss	Audrey (Cow)	Tundra	Finalist	
2015	YA/MG	William Bell	Julian	Doubleday Canada	Finalist	
2015	YA/MG	Polly Horvath	Lord and Lady Bunny: Almost Royalty!	Groundwood Books	Finalist	
2015	YA/MG	Deborah Ellis	Moon at Nine	Pajama Press	Finalist	
2016	C	Marianne Dubuc	Mr. Postmouse's Rounds	Kids Can Press	Winner	
2016	YA/MG	Susin Nielsen	We Are All Made of Molecules	Tundra Books	Winner	
2017	C	The Fan Brothers	The Night Gardener	Simon & Schuster	Winner	
2017	C	Chris Hadfield, illus. by The Fan Brothers	The Darkest Dark	Tundra Books	Finalist	
2017	C	Sara O'Leary, illus. by Qin Leng	A Family is a Family is a Family	Groundwood Books	Finalist	
2017	C	Kathy Stinson, illus. by Qin Leng	Harry and Walter	Annick Press	Finalist	
2017	C	Vikki VanSickle, illus. by Cale Atkinson	If I Had a Gryphon	Tundra Books	Finalist	
2017	YA/MG	Wesley King	OCDaniel	Paula Wiseman Books	Winner	
2017	YA/MG	Sara Cassidy	A Boy Named Queen	Groundwood Books	Finalist	
2017	YA/MG	Lisa Moore	Flannery	Groundwood Books	Finalist	
2017	YA/MG	Richard Scrimger	Lucky Jonah	HarperCollins Canada	Finalist	
2017	YA/MG	Frank Viva	Sea Change	Tundra Books	Finalist	
2018	C	Melanie Florence, illus. by Gabrielle Grimard	Stolen Words	Second St. Press	Winner	
2018	YA/MG	Heather Smith	The Agony of Bun O'Keefe	Penguin Teen	Winner	
2019	C	Wab Kinew, illus. by Joe Morse	Go Show the World: A Celebration of Indigenous Heroes	Tundra Books	Winner	
2019	C	Shauntay Grant, illus. by Eva Campbell	Africville	Groundwood Books	Finalist	
2019	C	Marie-Louise Gay	Mustafa	Groundwood Books	Finalist	
2019	C	Paula Ikuutaq Rumbolt, illus. by Lenny Lishchenko	The Origin of Day and Night	Inhabit Media	Finalist	
2019	C	Sheryl McFarlane, illus. by Leslie Redhead	Island in the Salish Sea	Orca Book Publishers	Finalist	
2019	YA/MG	Colleen Nelson	Sadia	Dundurn Press	Winner	
2019	YA/MG	Adam Garnet Jones	Fire Song	Annick Press	Finalist	
2019	YA/MG	Susin Nielsen	No Fixed Address	Tundra	Finalist	
2019	YA/MG	Monique Polak	Planet Grief	Orca	Finalist	
2019	YA/MG	Polly Horvath	Very Rich	Puffin Canada	Finalist	

=== 2020s ===
Award winners
Year	Category	Author	Title	Publisher	Result	Ref.
2020	C	Nicole Testa, illus. by Annie Boulanger	Lili Macaroni	Pajama Press	Winner	
2020	YA/MG	Kelley Armstrong	A Royal Guide to Monster Slaying	Puffin Canada	Winner	
2021	C	Heather M. O'Connor, illus. by Claudia Dávila	Fast Friends	Scholastic Canada .	Winner	
2021	YA/MG	Wesley King	Sara and the Search for Normal	Simon & Schuster / Paula Wiseman Books	Winner	
2022	C	Brittany Luby, illus. by Joshua Mangeshig Pawis-Steckley	Mii maanda ezhi-gkendmaanh / This Is How I Know	Groundwood Press	Winner	
2022	C	Bree Galbraith, illus. by Lynn Scurfield	Hold That Thought!	Owlkids Books	Finalist	
2022	C	Sara O'Leary, illus. by Qin Leng	A Kid is a Kid is a Kid	Groundwood Books	Finalist	
2022	C	David A. Robertson, illus. by Julie Flett	On the Trapline	Penguin Random House	Finalist	
2022	C	Paul Harbridge, illus. by Josée Bisaillon	Out into the Big Wide Lake	Tundra Books	Finalist	
2022	YA/MG	Philippa Dowding	Firefly	DCB	Winner	
2022	YA/MG	Kevin Sands	Children of the Fox	Tundra Books	Finalist	
2022	YA/MG	Heather Fawcett	The School Between Winter and Fairyland	HarperCollins/Balzer + Bray	Finalist	
2022	YA/MG	Caroline Adderson	Sunny Days Inside and Other Stories	Groundwood Books	Finalist	
2022	YA/MG	Susin Nielsen	Tremendous Things	Penguin Random House	Finalist	
2023	C	Jen Lynn Bailey, illus. by Maggie Zeng	This is the Boat That Ben Built	Pajama Press	Winner	
2023	C	Leona Prince and Gabrielle Prince, illus. by Carla Joseph	Be a Good Ancestor	Orca Books	Finalist	
2023	C	Shazia Afzal, illus. by Aliya Ghare	Journey of the Midnight Sun	Orca Book Publishers	Finalist	
2023	C	Elise Gravel and Mykaell Blais, illus. by Elise Gravel	Pink, Blue, and You!: Questions for Kids about Gender Stereotypes	Anne Schwartz Books	Finalist	
2023	C	Ashley Spires	The Most Magnificent Idea	Kids Can Press	Finalist	
2023	YA/MG	Nafiza Azad	Road of the Lost	Margaret K. McElderry Books / Simon & Schuster	Winner	
2023	YA/MG	Marthe Jocelyn	Aggie Morton, Mystery Queen: The Seaside Corpse	Tundra Books	Finalist	
2023	YA/MG	Teresa Toten	Eight Days	Scholastic Canada .	Finalist	
2023	YA/MG	Danielle Daniel	Forever Birchwood	HarperCollins Publishers	Finalist	
2023	YA/MG	Joel A. Sutherland	Haunted Canada: The Third Terrifying Collection	Scholastic Canada	Finalist	
2024	C	Melissa Mollen Dupuis, illus. by Elise Gravel	Nutshimit: In the Woods	Scholastic Canada .	Winner	
2024	YA/MG	Kevin Sands	The Raven's Revenge	Simon & Schuster	Winner	
2025	C	Yewande Daniel-Ayoade, illus. by Ken Daley	The Little Regent	Owlkids Books	Winner	
2025	C	Leonarda Carranza, illus. by Erika Medina	Fighting Words	Annick Press	Finalist	
2025	C	Debbie Ridpath Ohi	I Want to Read All the Books	Simon & Schuster Books for Young Readers	Finalist	
2025	C	Tasha Hilderman, illus. by Risa Hugo	Métis Like Me	Tundra Books/Penguin Random House Canada	Finalist	
2025	C	Thao Lam	One Giant Leap	Owlkids Books	Finalist	
2025	YA/MG	Cassandra Calin	The New Girl	Scholastic Canada .	Winner	
2025	YA/MG	S. K. Ali	Fledgling: The Keeper's Records of Revolution	Kokila/Penguin Random House	Finalist	
2025	YA/MG	Kern Carter	Is There a Boy Like Me?	Scholastic Canada	Finalist	
2025	YA/MG	Sarah Everett	The Shape of Lost Things	HarperCollins	Finalist	
2025	YA/MG	Jael Richardson (editor)	Today I Am: 10 Stories of Belonging	Scholastic Canada	Finalist	
2026	C	Jennifer Maruno, illus. by Miki Sato	Chidori: A Story of One Thousand Birds	Pajama Press	Winner	
2026	C	Monique Gray Smith, illus. by Nicole Neidhardt	Dreaming Alongside	Orca Book Publishers	Finalist	
2026	C	Susan Avingaq, illus. by Maren Vsetula	Grandma Can Make Anything	Inhabit Media	Finalist	
2026	C	Howie Shia	Ra! Ta! Ma! Cue!	Annick Press	Finalist	
2026	C	Tamara Levine, illus. by Ellie Arscott	The Warmest Blanket in the World	Second Story Press	Finalist	
2026	YA/MG	Kate Blair	We Bury Nothing	DCB Young Readers / Cormorant Books	Winner	
2026	YA/MG	Kenneth Oppel	Best of All Worlds	Penguin Teen Canada	Finalist	
2026	YA/MG	Kim Spencer	I Won't Feel This Way Forever	Orca Book Publishers	Finalist	
2026	YA/MG	Cary Fagan	Robot Island	Tundra Books/Penguin Random House Canada	Finalist	
2026	YA/MG	Aviaq Johnston, illus. by Athena Gubbe	The Haunted Blizzard	Inhabit Media	Finalist	
