= 1994 Governor General's Awards =

Canadian literary award

Each winner of the 1994 Governor General's Awards for Literary Merit received $10 000 and a medal from the Governor General of Canada. The winners were selected by a panel of judges set up by the Canada Council for the Arts.

== English ==
Category	Winner	Nominated
Fiction	Rudy Wiebe, A Discovery of Strangers	Margaret Atwood, The Robber Bride; Donna McFarlane, Division of Surgery; Alice Munro, Open Secrets; Russell Smith, How Insensitive
Non-fiction	John A. Livingston, Rogue Primate: An Exploration of Human Domestication	Sharon Butala, The Perfection of the Morning: An Apprenticeship in Nature; Denise Chong, The Concubine's Children: Portrait of a Family; Joan Haggerty, The Invitation: A Memoir of Family Love and Reconciliation; Peter Larisey, Light for a Cold Land: Lawren Harris's Work and Life-An Interpretation
Poetry	Robert Hilles, Cantos from a Small Room	Robin Blaser, The Holy Forest; Polly Fleck, The Chinese Execution; Monty Reid, Dog Sleeps
Drama	Morris Panych, The Ends of the Earth	Joanna McClelland Glass, If We Are Women; Wendy Lill, All Fall Down; Bryden MacDonald, Whale Riding Weather
Children's literature	Julie Johnston, Adam and Eve and Pinch-Me	Sarah Ellis, Out of the Blue; Carol Matas, The Burning Time; Jim McGugan, Josepha: A Prairie Boy's Story; Ken Roberts, Past Tense
Children's illustration	Murray Kimber, Josepha: A Prairie Boy's Story	Marie Lafrance, La Diablesse and the Baby; Michèle Lemieux, There Was An Old Man...: A Collection of Limericks; Laurie McGaw, Polar the Titanic Bear
French to English translation	Donald Winkler, The Lyric Generation: The Life and Times of the Baby Boomers	Patricia Claxton, Tchipayuk or The Way of the Wolf; Sheila Fischman, The Sound of Living Things; David Homel, An Aroma of Coffee; Shelley Tepperman, Playing Bare

== French ==
Category	Winner	Nominated
Fiction	Robert Lalonde, Le petit aigle à tête blanche	Réjean Ducharme, Va savoir; Daniel Poliquin, L'Écureuil noir; Hélène Rioux, Pense à mon rendez-vous; Sylvain Trudel, Les Prophètes
Non-fiction	Chantal Saint-Jarre, Du SIDA	Fernand Dumont, Genèse de la société québécoise; Jean Lamarre, Le devenir de la nation québécoise; Ginette Pelland, La peur des mots; Georges E. Sioui, Les Wendats : une civilisation méconnue
Poetry	Fulvio Caccia, Aknos	Marcel Labine, Machines imaginaires; Rachel Leclerc, Rabatteurs d'étoiles; Paul Chanel Malenfant, Hommes de profil; Pierre Ouellet, Vita chiara, villa oscura
Drama	Michel Ouellette, French Town	Michelle Allen, Morgane; Yvan Bienvenue, Histoires à mourir d'amour; Claude Poissant, Si tu meurs, je te tue; Jean-Pierre Ronfard, Cinq études
Children's literature	Suzanne Martel, Une belle journée pour mourir	Marie-Danielle Croteau, Un monde à la dérive; François Gravel, Klonk
Children's illustration	Pierre Pratt, Mon chien est un éléphant	Sylvie Deronzier, Tartarin et le lion; Stéphane Poulin, Le parc aux sortilèges; Rémy Simard, Monsieur noir et blanc; Gilles Tibo, Simon et la plume perdue
English to French translation	Jude Des Chênes, Le mythe du sauvage	Claire Dupond and Hervé Juste, Les spécialistes des sciences sociales et la politique au Canada; Michèle Marineau, Au-delà des ténèbres; Normand Paiement and Hervé Juste, Les Géants des ordures; Daniel Poliquin, Le récit de voyage en Nouvelle – France de l'abbé peintre Hugues Pommier
