= Canadian Library Association Young Adult Book Award =

Annual literary award

The Canadian Library Association Young Adult Book Award was a literary award given annually from 1981 to 2016 to recognize a Canadian book of young adult fiction written in English and published in Canada, written by a citizen or permanent resident of Canada.

The award was administered and presented by the Canadian Library Association, which disbanded in 2016. The award was established by the Young Adult Caucus of the Saskatchewan Library Association in 1980 and inaugurated by an award to Kevin Major of Newfoundland and Labrador for Far from Shore, published by Clarke, Irwin & Company of Toronto.

The companion CLA Book of the Year for Children Award was inaugurated in 1947 and was presented annually without exception from 1963. Its criteria included "appeal to children up to and including age 12" and "creative (i.e., original) writing (i.e., fiction, poetry, narrative, non-fiction, retelling of traditional literature)". Corresponding criteria for the YA Book Award are "[appeal] to young adults between the ages of 13 and 18" and "fiction (novel, collection of short stories, or graphic novel)".

The Canadian Library Association also administered a book award for illustrators, the Amelia Frances Howard-Gibbon Illustrator's Award.

== Winners ==
Canadian Library Association Young Adult Book Award winners
Year	Author	Title	Publisher
1981	Kevin Major	Far from Shore	Clarke, Irwin & Company
1982	Jamie Brown	Superbike	Clarke, Irwin & Company
1983	Monica Hughes	Hunter in the Dark	Clarke, Irwin & Company
1984	O. R. Melling	The Druid's Tune	Penguin Books
1985	Mary-Ellen Lang Collura	Winners	Western Producer Prairie Books
1986	Marianne Brandis	The Quarter-Pie Window	The Porcupine's Quill
1987	Janet Lunn	Shadow in Hawthorn Bay	Lester & Orpen Dennys
1988	Margaret Buffie	Who is Frances Rain?	Kids Can Press
1989	Helen Fogwill Porter	January, February, June or July	Breakwater Books
1990	Diana Wieler	Bad Boy	Groundwood
1991	Budge Wilson	The Leaving	House of Anansi Press
1992	Susan Lynn Reynolds	Strandia	HarperCollins
1993	Karleen Bradford	There Will be Wolves	HarperCollins
1994	Sean Stewart	Nobody's Son	Macmillan
1995	Julie Johnston	Adam and Eve and Pinch-Me	Lester
1996	Tim Wynne-Jones	The Maestro	Groundwood/Douglas & McIntyre
1997	R. P. MacIntyre	Takes: Stories for Young Adults	Thistledown Press
1998	Martha Brooks	Bone Dance	Groundwood/Douglas & McIntyre
1999	Gayle Friesen	Janey's Girl	Kids Can Press
2000	Katherine Holubitsky	Alone at Ninety Foot	Orca Book Publishers
2001	Beth Goobie	Before Wings	Orca Book Publishers
2002	William Bell	Stones	Doubleday Canada
2003	Martha Brooks	True Confessions of a Heartless Girl	Groundwood/Douglas & McIntyre
2004	Polly Horvath	The Canning Season	Groundwood/Douglas & McIntyre
2005	Miriam Toews	A Complicated Kindness	Alfred A. Knopf Canada
2006	Shyam Selvadurai	Swimming in the Monsoon Sea	Tundra Books
2007	William Bell	The Blue Helmet	Doubleday
2008	Martha Brooks	Mistik Lake	Groundwood
2009	Allan Stratton	Chanda's Wars	HarperCollins
2010	Lesley Livingston	Wondrous Strange	HarperCollins
2011	Kenneth Oppel	Half Brother	HarperCollins
2012	Catherine Austen	All Good Children	Orca Book Publishers
2013	Martine Leavitt	My Book of Life by Angel	Groundwood/House of Anansi Press
2014	Karen Bass	Graffiti Knight	Pajama Press
2015	Mariko Tamaki and Jillian Tamaki	This One Summer	Groundwood
2016	Erin Bow	The Scorpion Rules	Simon & Schuster Canada

== Repeat winners ==
Martha Brooks is a three-time winner of the Young Adult Book Award for 1998, 2003, and 2008, William Bell is a two-time winner, in 2002 and 2007.

== Winners of multiple awards ==
Two books won both the Young Adult Book Award and the CLA Book of the Year for Children Award: Shadow in Hawthorn Bay by Janet Lunn in 1987 and Half Brother by Kenneth Oppel in 2011.

Six books won both the Young Adult Book Award and the Governor General's Award for English-language children's literature, or Canada Council Children's Literature Prize before 1987. The writers and CLA award dates were Hughes 1983, Lunn 1987, (now under the present name) Wieler 1990, Johnston 1995, Wynne-Jones 1996, and Brooks 2003.

Thus Shadow in Hawthorn Bay (Lester & Orpen Dennys, 1986) by Janet Lunn won three major Canadian awards, the CLA awards for both children's and young-adult literature and the Governor General's Award in its last year as the Canada Council Children's Literature Prize.

Two winners of the CLA Young Adult Book Award were also recognized by major annual book awards in the United States. Polly Horvath won the 2003 National Book Award for Young People's Literature for The Canning Season. This One Summer, a graphic novel by Mariko and Jillian Tamaki, was one of the 2015 Honour Books, or finalists, for both the American Library Association (ALA) Michael L. Printz Award as the year's best new work for young adults judged "by literary merit alone" (recognizing Mariko Tamaki) and the ALA Caldecott Medal, or children's picture book illustration award (recognizing Jillian Tamaki).

== See also ==
- British Carnegie Medal
