= Scaredy Squirrel (TV series) =

Canadian animated TV series

- Genre: Comedy; Surreal comedy Animated sitcom Slapstick comedy
- Based on: Scaredy Squirrel by Mélanie Watt
- Developed by: Matt Ferguson; Jillian Ruby
- Directed by: Matt Ferguson; Mike MacDougall (season 3)
- Voices of: Terry McGurrin; Jonathan Gould; Patrick McKenna; Jayne Eastwood; David Berni; Linda Kash; Jamie Watson; Dwayne Hill
- Opening theme: "Scaredy Squirrel"
- Ending theme: "Scaredy Squirrel" (instrumental)
- Composer: Paul Intson
- Country of origin: Canada
- Original language: English
- No. of seasons: 3
- No. of episodes: 52 (104 segments) (list of episodes)

Production
- Executive producers: Doug Murphy; Colin Bohm; Irene Wiebel
- Producer: Jillian Ruby
- Running time: 22–23 minutes (11–12 minutes per segment)
- Production company: Nelvana

Original release
- Network: YTV
- Release: April 1, 2011 – August 17, 2013

Scaredy Squirrel is a Canadian animated comedy television series loosely based on the Scaredy Squirrel book series by Mélanie Watt. The series premiered on April 1, 2011, on YTV. The final episode aired in Canada on August 17, 2013.

== Plot ==
The series chronicles the adventures of Scaredy, an energetic anthropomorphic squirrel, and his best friend Dave, a skunk. Their antics take place in the fictional Balsa City, and often at the local supermarket the Stash "N" Hoard, where Scaredy works as a stacker.

== Characters ==
- Scaredy Orville Squirrel (voiced by Terry McGurrin) is a smart, germophobic, and occasionally shy orange squirrel who works as a stacker at a grocery store called Stash "N" Hoard and is fond of cleaning. Unlike the books where he is a flying squirrel, this adaptation of Scaredy resembles an American red squirrel.
- David "Dave" Skunkerton Weeb (voiced by Jonathan Gould) is a blue skunk who is Scaredy's best friend. He is dim-witted and is fond of being messy and farting.
- Nestor (voiced by Patrick McKenna) is a yellow canary who is the manager of Stash "N" Hoard. He is Scaredy's boss and also frenemies with him.
- Momma (voiced by Jayne Eastwood) is a grouchy, light purple canary who owns the Stash "N" Hoard, and is Nestor's mother. Momma makes surprise appearances at any time, and is fond of firing people, even those who don't work at the Stash "N" Hoard. Additionally, she appears to have little respect for her son Nestor and generally refuses to approve of him.
- Paddy (voiced by David Berni) is a egotistical, gray ferret who is always making trouble for Scaredy.
- Sally (voiced by Linda Kash) is a turquoise trout who is deeply in love with Scaredy. Sally is confident and thinks she and Scaredy could be a good couple, when in truth Scaredy is freaked out by her.
- Mildred (voiced by Jamie Watson) is a light green toad who works at the Stash "N" Hoard and seems to be Nestor's only friend. She is always seen drinking a bottle of soda and is constantly belching. She is also a secret spy but only Scaredy and Dave know.
- Bucky "Buck" Beaver (voiced by David Berni) is a beaver who works at the Stash "N" Hoard. He is friends with Hatton, Scaredy and Dave.
- Hatton (voiced by Dwayne Hill) is a donkey who works at the Stash "N" Hoard. He is friends with Buck, Scaredy and Dave.
- Milly (voiced by Laurie Elliott) is a strange domestic cow that lives in Balsa City. Often seen dancing. She also licks Scaredy in his sleep.
- Philmore (voiced by Terry McGurrin) is an excited, nervous, fast-talking peacock who frequents the Stash "N" Hoard.
- Sue (voiced by Julie Lemieux) is a orange squirrel, whom Scaredy develops a crush for, but later discovers is insane. She wears a green dress and a ponytail. Despite being present in the theme song, her only appearance in the series was in the episode "Acting Silly".

== Production ==
The series was produced by Nelvana for YTV, with additional production facilities provided by Studio 306, Pipeline Studios, & Super Sonics Productions Inc., Dolby Digital doing the sound, Writers Guild of Canada, Diramix and ACTRA writing the show's renewal plates, and The Canada Media Fund and The Canadian Film or Video Production Tax Credit providing the series' funding. Development for the show began in the spring of 2008. On April 5, 2011, it was announced that it was renewed for a second season. On November 2, 2012, it was announced that it was renewed for a third season.

== Broadcast ==
The series aired on YTV in Canada, premiering on April 1, 2011, with the final episode aired on August 17, 2013.

The series premiered on Cartoon Network in the United States on August 9, 2011, and aired through September 17, 2014. It also aired on Qubo.

In Latin America, the show premiered on Cartoon Network on January 2, 2012. The show premiered on Pop in the United Kingdom on January 5, 2013, and was regularly broadcast on Kix (now Pop Max). An Irish dub premiered on TG4 in Ireland in 2015. The show was also broadcast on Disney Channel and Disney XD channels in 11 territories, including Spain and France.

The entire series has been made available for free on Tubi. The series has never been officially released on DVD.
