= The King's Daughter (disambiguation) =

The King's Daughter is a 1974 historical novel.

The King's Daughter(s) may also refer to:

- The King's Daughters, a 2000 French film
- The King's Daughter (1916 film), a British film
- The King's Daughter (2022 film), an American film

== See also ==
- Daughters of the King, a religious order
- The King's Daughter, Soo Baek-hyang, a Korean TV series
- Geirlug The King's Daughter, an Icelandic fairy tale
- The Marsh King's Daughter, an upcoming psychological thriller film
- The Spider King's Daughter, a 2012 novel
- The Monkey King's Daughter, a young readers book series
- International Order of the King's Daughters and Sons, an interdenominational Christian philanthropic organization
