= Nobody's Son =

Nobody's Son may refer to:

- Nobody's Son (film), a 1917 Hungarian film
- Nobody's Son (novel), a 1993 novel by Sean Stewart
- "Nobody's Son" (song), a 2025 song by Sabrina Carpenter
