= Duncan Weller =

Canadian writer and illustrator

- Born: Lennoxville, Canada
- Education: Lakehead University
- Occupations: Writer, illustrator

Duncan Weller is a Canadian writer and visual artist known for his children's picture books. Weller won a Governor General's Award and the Ruth and Sylvia Schwartz Award, for his picture book The Boy from the Sun.

== Early life and education ==
Weller was born in Lennoxville, Quebec and grew up in Thunder Bay. He attended Lakehead University, fine art and obtaining an HBA in English literature.

== Career ==
In 2008 Weller won the 2007 Governor General's Award for English-language children's illustration for his book The Boy from the Sun. The same book also won the Ruth and Sylvia Schwartz Children's Book Award, awarded by the Ontario Arts Foundation.

In 2013 Weller self-published three hardcover children's picture books, The Love Ant, Big Electric Cat and The Ugg and the Drip. More recent books are: Hardball and Riley: The Ultimate Package (a collection of comics), The Chameleon Snake (a children's picture book), and a novel, We Play You.

He is a painter as well as a writer.
