= Polar the Titanic Bear =

Children's book

Polar the Titanic Bear is a children's book written by Margaretta "Daisy" Corning Spedden (née Stone) (19 November 1871 – 10 February 1950) and released in 1994. Spedden was an American heiress who survived the 1912 sinking of the Titanic, and her account of her family's trip and the eventual disaster, written as a tale to amuse her seven-year-old son, was published about 45 years after her death. The story is told from the point of view of a Teddy Bear.

== How the story was written ==
Spedden was born in Morristown, New Jersey and lived with her husband Frederic and son Douglas in Tuxedo Park, New York. The family traveled frequently, and she kept detailed diaries of the trips.

In April, 1912, the Speddens booked passage on the Titanic. After the ship sank, Daisy was rescued by the RMS Carpathia. All members of the Spedden entourage survived the disaster. The next year, Spedden wrote and illustrated a book which told the story of the trip, sinking, and rescue from the point of view of Douglas' Teddy Bear. She gave the storybook to Douglas as a Christmas present. Three years later, Douglas was killed in an automobile accident. Daisy died February 10, 1950, and the storybook remained among the family possessions for the next forty years.

== Publication ==
After many years, the storybook was found in a trunk by Leighton H. Coleman III, a relative of Spedden's, and he decided to have it published. The story was edited by Hugh Brewster of Madison Books in Toronto, Ontario, and Canadian artist Laurie McGaw was chosen to illustrate the book in watercolours. Coleman wrote an introduction explaining how the story came about. Some of Spedden's photographs and pictures of Titanic souvenirs were also used as illustrations. Madison Books published the first edition in 1994.

Editions:

- Madison Books, 1994
- Little Brown and Company, 1994, 2001. (ISBN 0-316-80909-8).
- Scholastic Books, 1998
- Hodder Headline, 1998 (ISBN 0733609104)
- Rebound by Sagebrush, 2001. (ISBN 0613717678)

The book has been translated into German, Spanish, Dutch and Japanese.

== Awards ==
Polar the Titanic Bear has won a number of awards for children's literature, including:

- Silver Birch Award of the Ontario Library Association
- 1998 BILBY Award (Young Readers Category) (Australia)
- Society of School Librarians' Award for International Best Book for K-6
- Finalist for the 1994 Governor General's Award (Canada), for Laurie McGaw's illustrations
- 1995 - Children's Choice Award

== See also ==
- 1994 Governor General's Awards
