= Scaredy Squirrel =

Children's literature series

- Editor: Tara Walker
- Author: M. Watt
- Language: English
- Series: Scaredy Squirrel
- Set in: Oak tree
- Publisher: Kids Can Press
- Publication date: March 2006
- Publication place: Canada
- Pages: 36
- Award: ALA Notable books
- Preceded by: N/A
- Followed by: Scaredy Squirrel Makes a Friend

Scaredy Squirrel is a children's book series written and illustrated by Canadian author Mélanie Watt. The first book of the Scaredy Squirrel series was published in March 2006 by Kids Can Press. A television series based on the books was aired in 2011.

== Premise ==
The stories are told using large pictures with basic descriptive text. The books follow the same format: the titular protagonist Scaredy Squirrel identifies his fears, shows how he avoids them at all costs, and develops contingency plans, which typically involve an emergency kit and playing dead until the threat has passed. In the stories, Scaredy is confronted with the fears he tries to avoid, consequently learning that they are not as bad as he initially imagined. However, he only slightly alters his strict daily routines after these experiences.

== Books ==
The first book, Scaredy Squirrel, introduces the titular character. Scaredy is a nervous squirrel who keeps safe in his tree to avoid his many fears, following an intricate routine. One day, he has an unexpected visitor, whom he wrongly assumes is a killer bee. He leaps out of his tree in a panic and discovers that he is a flying squirrel. An animated short film of the same title, directed by Galen Fott, was released in 2011 by Weston Woods.

The second book of Scaredy Squirrel, Scaredy Squirrel Makes a Friend, was published in March 2007 by Kids Can Press. In it, Scaredy decides to leave his nut tree and find the perfect friend. With planning and preparation, Scaredy sets off with rubber gloves and an air freshener in hand, finding an unexpected friend through a dog. This story also inspired an animated short, directed by Galen Fott.

The third Scaredy Squirrel title, Scaredy Squirrel at the Beach, was published in March 2008. In this book, Scaredy Squirrel plans a beach getaway under his nut tree, complete with a germ-free inflatable pool and plastic flamingo. With his meticulous map and worst-case scenario contingency plan, Scaredy sets off to bring home the perfect seashell to complete his beach vacation with the sound of the ocean.

The fourth Scaredy Squirrel book, Scaredy Squirrel at Night, was published in February 2009. In the book, Scaredy Squirrel does not want to go to sleep for fear of nightmares. One night, Scaredy is forced to take drastic measures when his horoscope says that at midnight, his dreams will come true. This book was also adapted into a film in 2015.

The fifth Scaredy Squirrel book, Scaredy Squirrel Has a Birthday Party, was published in 2011. In the book, Scaredy Squirrel does not want to have a big birthday party for fear of it being spoiled by various animals. He plans to invite only himself to his birthday party, but when someone sends him a happy birthday card, Scaredy thinks he has to return the favor and invite the card sender. When the sender arrives with several other animals, Scaredy learns parties are more fun with others.

=== Picture books ===
- Scaredy Squirrel (2006)
- Scaredy Squirrel Makes a Friend (2007)
- Scaredy Squirrel at the Beach (2008)
- Scaredy Squirrel at Night (2009)
- Scaredy Squirrel Has a Birthday Party (2011)
- Scaredy Squirrel Prepares for Christmas: A Safety Guide for Scaredies (2012)
- Scaredy Squirrel Prepares for Halloween: A Safety Guide for Scaredies (2013)
- Scaredy Squirrel Goes Camping (2013)
- Scaredy Squirrel Visits the Doctor (2022)

=== Graphic Novels (Scaredy's Nutty Adventures) ===
- Scaredy Squirrel in a Nutshell (2021)
- Scaredy Squirrel Gets a Surprise (2022)
- Scaredy Squirrel Gets Festive (2023)
- Scaredy Squirrel Scared Silly (2024)

== Awards ==
=== American ===
Won:

- ALA's Notable Children's Books
- Independent Publisher Book Awards – Picture Books 6 and under (Bronze)
- Children's and YA Bloggers' Literary Awards (Cybils)
- NCTE Notable Children's Books in Language Arts

Shortlisted:

- ReadBoston 2006 Best Read Aloud Book Award
- ForeWord Book of the Year Award
- Washington Children's Choice Picture Book Award
- North Carolina Children's Book Award – Picture Book

=== Canadian ===
Won:

- Ruth and Sylvia Schwartz Children's Book Award for Children's Picture Book (Scaredy Squirrel, 2007)
- OLA Blue Spruce Award 2007 & 2008
- Amelia Frances Howard-Gibbon Illustrator's Award

Shortlisted:

- CBA Libris Award for Children's Author of the Year
- Ruth and Sylvia Schwartz Children's Book Award for Children's Picture Book (Scaredy Squirrel Makes a Friend, 2008)

=== International ===
Won:

- Le Prix de la Librairie Millepage in Vincennes, 2006 (France)

Selection:

- Richard & Judy Book Club Selection (UK)

== TV series ==
In 2011, Scaredy Squirrel was adapted into a 52-episode animated series. The show aired on YTV, Nickelodeon (Canada) & Teletoon (Canada), Cartoon Network (United States/Australia/New Zealand/Latin America), POP, Challenge TV, Sky One, ITV (TV network) and CITV (United Kingdom), Disney XD (France/Poland), and True Spark (Thailand). In the English version, Scaredy is voiced by Terry McGurrin.

The series is very loosely based on the books.
