= Douglas Spedden =

Child survivor of the sinking of the RMS Titanic

Robert Douglas Spedden
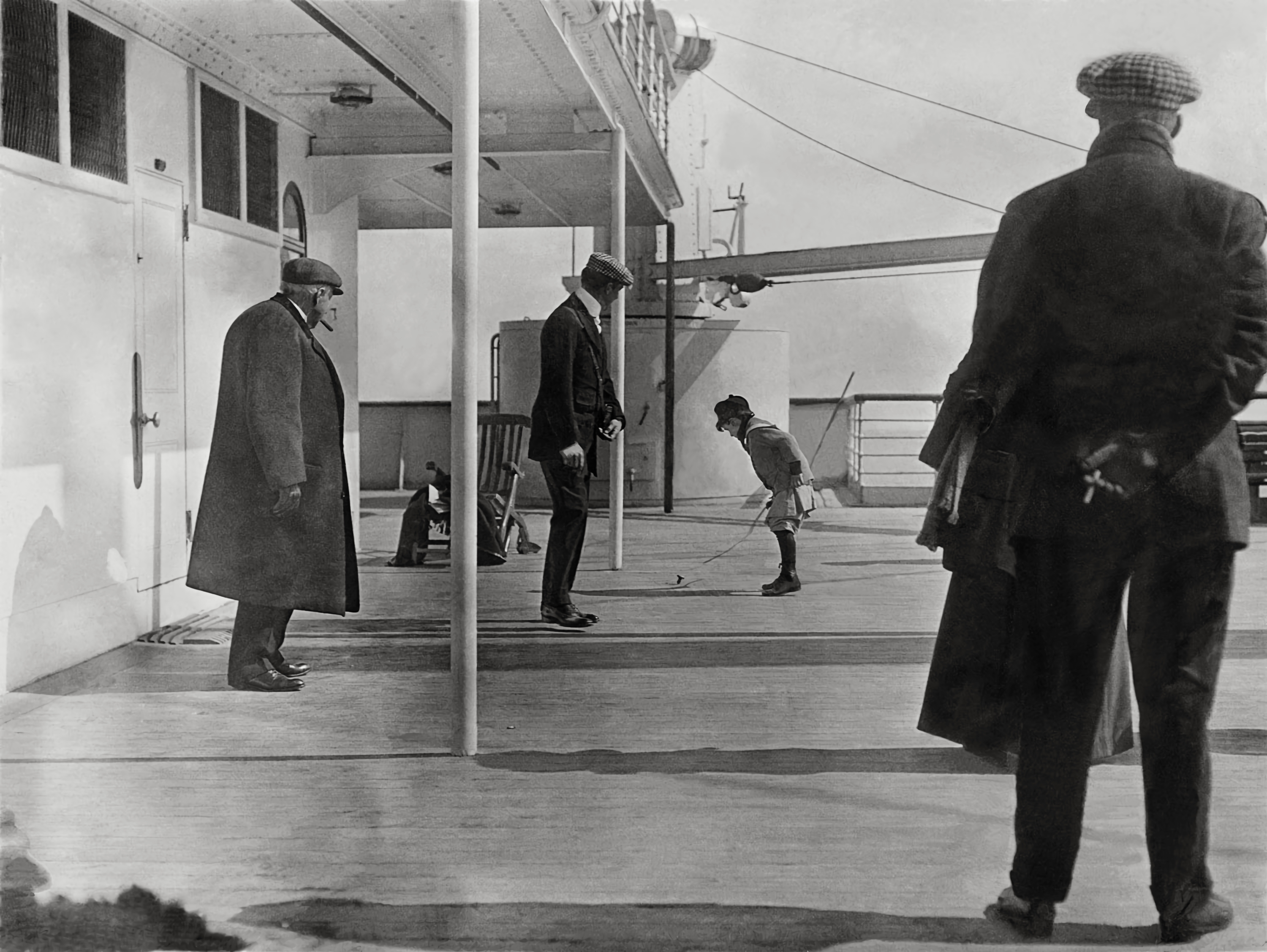
- Douglas Spedden (center right) playing on the Titanic, April 1912
- Born: November 19, 1905
- Died: August 8, 1915 (aged 9)
- Known for: A Passenger On The ill-fated RMS Titanic in 1912

Robert Douglas Spedden (19 November 1905 – 8 August 1915) was a child survivor of the sinking of the RMS Titanic. After surviving the sinking, his mother Daisy Spedden wrote the book Polar the Titanic Bear for him. Spedden died three years after the sinking, when he was hit by an automobile.

== Background ==
Spedden was aboard the Titanic at age six, travelling with his family back to their home in Tuxedo Park, New York, following a family trip through Algeria. On board the ship for the first leg of the trip, from Southampton, England, to Cobh, Ireland, was Jesuit priest Francis Browne; by chance, Browne captured a photograph of Spedden playing with a spinning top on the deck of the Titanic.

== Sinking ==
On April 14, the evening of the sinking, traveling in first class, Spedden was put to bed in his compartment. During the sinking he awoke briefly when his nurse Elisabeth Burns told him she was taking him "on a trip to see the stars". He is reported to have slept through the rest of the sinking, waking up in a lifeboat the next morning.

== Death ==
He died in 1915 at age nine, after being hit by an automobile.

Spedden was included briefly in the 1997 film Titanic, played by actor Thomas Fiss. Spedden's mother Daisy Corning Stone Spedden wrote the book Polar the Titanic Bear for Douglas. The book documents the family's travels, and includes a section on the family's survival of the Titanic's sinking.
