= Wesley King =

Canadian author (born 1987)

Wesley King CM
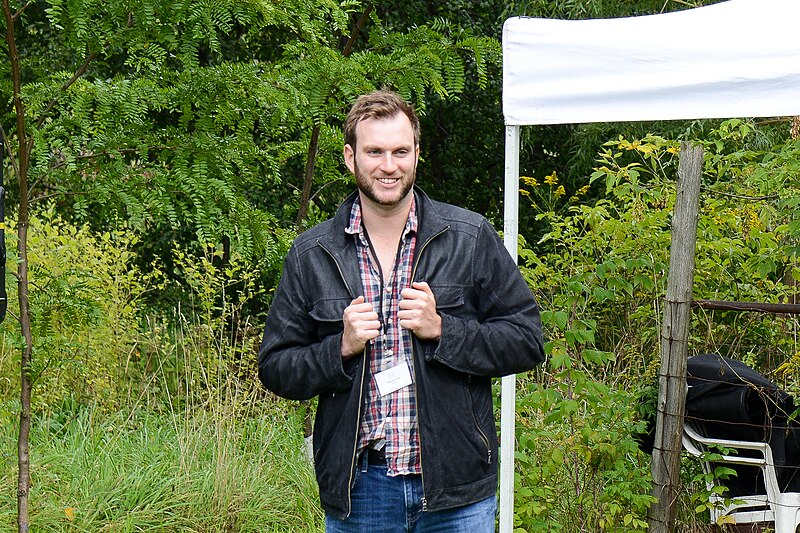
- King at the Eden Mills Writers' Festival in 2018
- Born: Wesley Thomas King; January 11, 1987 (age 39); Ajax, Ontario, Canada
- Occupation: Writer
- Known for: The Wizenard Series, OCDaniel, A World Below

Wesley King (born January 11, 1987) is a Canadian author of young adult fiction books. Both his novels with Kobe Bryant debuted at number one on The New York Times Best Seller list. He has written 15 novels as of 2026. He currently resides in Newfoundland.

== Biography ==
King was born in Ajax, Ontario, and graduated with a journalism degree from Carleton University. He began working on his first novel soon after, The Vindico, about five teens kidnapped by supervillains. It won a 2013 Red Maple Fiction Award from Canada's Forest of Reading.

In 2016, King was approached by Kobe Bryant to collaborate on a new children series. The first installment, Training Camp, was released in 2019 and debuted as a number one New York Times bestseller. The second installment, Season One, was released in March 2020 after Bryant's death and also became a number one New York Times bestseller.

He won a 2019 Red Maple Fiction Award for A World Below, a story of a class field trip interrupted by an earthquake.

King publicly discusses his struggle with mental health, specifically surrounding obsessive–compulsive disorder and generalized anxiety disorder. He wrote the bestselling novel OCDaniel in 2016 which described his experiences growing up and won an Edgar Award in the Best Juvenile category. He published a prequel to the series in 2020. OCDaniel and Sara and the Search for Normal (2020) won the Ruth & Sylvia Schwartz Children's Book Award, in 2017 and 2021, respectively.

His books have been translated for release in many countries around the world.

== Published works ==
- Beast Ballerz (Tundra, 2026)
- Benny on the Case (Paula Wiseman Books, 2025)
- Butt Sandwich & Tree (Paula Wiseman Books, 2022)
- Hello (from here) (Dial Books, 2021)
- Sara and the Search for Normal (Paula Wiseman Books, 2020)
- The Wizenard Series: Season One (Granity Studios, 2020)
- The Wizenard Series: Training Camp (Granity Studios, 2019)
- A World Below (Paula Wiseman Books, 2018)
- Laura Monster Crusher (Penguin Canada, 2017)
- Enemy of the Realm (Razorbill, 2017)
- OCDaniel (Paula Wiseman Books, 2016)
- Dragons vs. Drones (Razorbill, 2016)
- The Incredible Space Raiders (from Space!) (Paula Wiseman Books, 2015)
- The Feros (G. P. Putnam's Sons, 2014)
- The Vindico (G. P. Putnam's Sons, 2014)
