= Mary C. Sheppard =

Canadian author and journalist

- Occupation: Author, journalist

Website
- marycsheppard.ca

Mary C. Sheppard is a Canadian author and former journalist whose works of fiction explore the social history of Newfoundland. She was a radio and online news journalist at the Canadian Broadcasting Corporation, later serving as executive producer for CBCNews.ca until her retirement in 2014. She is the author of the young adult fiction series Tales from Cook's Cove, and in 2024 published a historical fiction novel titled Where the Heart Is.

== Early life and education ==
Sheppard grew up in a family of nine children in Corner Brook, Newfoundland. She holds a Bachelor of Arts from St. Francis Xavier University and a Master of Science in Journalism from Columbia University.

== Career ==
Sheppard spent most of her career as a journalist for the Canadian Broadcasting Corporation in radio and online news. She also worked at Maclean's magazine and the Women's Television Network. She wrote her first book while living in Amsterdam in the mid-1990s. After returning to Canada, she taught Broadcast Journalism at The Metropolitan University of Toronto, and then returned to the CBC as the Executive Producer of CBCNews.ca until she retired in 2014.

While at the CBC, Sheppard received the Jeanne Sauvé Award for women in broadcasting.

=== Fiction writing ===
Sheppard's first book, Seven for a Secret, was published in 2001 by Groundwood Books. It is the first in a young adult coming-of-age series, titled Tales from Cook's Cove, and is inspired by Sheppard's experiences of growing up in Newfoundland and spending her summers visiting isolated fishing communities around the Bay of Islands. Seven for a Secret, set in the 1960s, follows a young woman and her female cousins as they face challenges navigating their loyalty to family and community versus the pursuit of a life beyond the island and motherhood. Seven for a Secret won the Ruth and Sylvia Schwartz Award and was listed as a top ten book by the American Library Association.

One for Sorrow, published in 2008 by Penguin Canada, is the second book of the series, and is set in the early 1970s. It explores challenging family dynamics and life circumstances through the perspective of a young girl who is unable to read, who dreams of leaving her miserable life in Newfoundland.

Three for a Wedding, published in 2009 by Penguin, is the third book of the series and is set in the 1980s. Drawing on the changing dynamics of island life that came with improved roads, the book reconnects with many characters from Seven for a Secret twenty years later.

Sheppard's 2024 book Where the Heart Is is a historical fiction set in Newfoundland during the First World War. It is a spy romance story that draws on the history of the Heart's Content Cable Station, and explores the challenges faced by women as they entered the labour force and the social dynamics of the region and period.
