= Adam and Eve and Pinch-Me (Johnston novel) =

1994 young adult novel by Julie Johnston

- First edition cover (US & Canada)
- Author: Julie Johnston
- Genre: Young adult fiction
- Publisher: Lester Publishing
- Publication date: May 1, 1994
- Publication place: Canada
- Pages: 180 pp.
- Awards: Governor General's Award for Text in Children's Literature; Canadian Library Association Young Adult Book Award
- ISBN: 978-189555562-2
- OCLC: 32242780
- LC Class: PZ7.J64435 Ad 1994a

Adam and Eve and Pinch-Me is a young adult novel written by Julie Johnston and published in 1994 by Lester in Toronto (Little, Brown in the US). The book was awarded the Governor General's Award for Text in Children's Literature in 1994, the Ruth & Sylvia Schwartz Children's Book Award in 1995, and the Canadian Library Association Young Adult Book Award, also in 1995.

== Summary ==
Sara Moone is a 15-year-old girl floating through life trying not to get attached to anyone. She belongs to Children's Aid. She has been to many foster homes, so many that she has lost count. This is the last foster home she will ever have to go to as she is almost 16, the age that she can legally drop out of the system. She moves in with the Huddlestons. This includes Ma and Hud as well as two other foster children, Josh and Nick. Sara's goal for life is to drop out of school and move north. She mentions being a bush pilot. Sara's main friend is a machine, her computer. A gift from her last foster father. Throughout the book, as she begins to open up more, she begins to befriend others and allow herself to feel the things shes been hiding from for so long. This story shows Sara transforming "from a defiant, introverted foster child who hates to be touched, into an involved and important member of her new family and community."

Her first real friend is Matt, the boy who lives down the highway at a bed and breakfast with his mother. He is someone who she tries to avoid, although he seems to be trying to get to know her a little better. Initially he sits next to her on the bus to school sometimes. After they talk a few times, he starts to ask her some more personal questions, to which she gives next to no answers. Throughout the book, the reader sees their relationship develop and blossom into a beautiful friendship. He insists upon trying to help Sara break out of her shell she has developed for so long. She does hurt his feelings with her harsh comments once or twice, which she instantly regrets, however they always recover.

Sara has some problems accepting Josh, her new foster brother, into her life. He is young, about 3 or 4 years old. Sara finds him extremely annoying at times. He interrupts her repeatedly while she is busy doing other things. As the story progresses however she comes to feel a bit of empathy for him. He was beaten by his mother something Sara has apparently seen quite a bit of in her lifetime. The turning point in their relationship is when Sara tries to play "Adam and Eve and Pinch Me" with Josh, something she had been tricked into before. When she pinches him, his feelings get hurt and Sara tries to talk herself out of pitying him however fails. They grow from there, Sara feeling similar to Josh's personal guard against Nick.

Sara feels like she needs to find a part-time job. Initially Ma suggests getting a job at the E-elite. As shes inquiring about that job, Matt mentions working for a man who comes every summer to stay at his family's Bed and Breakfast. The only thing about that job was it required a computer and printer. Only one of which Sara had. She promised Grainger Cleary she would have that as soon as possible. After he assured her that he had one she could borrow, she got straight to work.

The twist for this book is The Woman who is looking for her daughter she put up for adoption almost 16 years ago. She had heard through Children's Aid Sara would be transferring to this new home and The Woman knew that it was Sara she was looking for. It seems Sara knows this woman is most likely her mother, something she isn't extraordinarily excited about. Throughout the book we see Sara's struggle of accepting this new woman into her life or supporting Ma after a tragedy in the family.

== Reception ==
Kirkus Reviews wrote "With a wry eye, keen pacing, and a wonderfully nimble narrative, the author of Hero of Lesser Causes (1993) stirs up something saucy and fresh ..." while Publishers Weekly found "Although neither as well-modulated nor as disciplined as Hero, the novel is moving and memorable."

== Awards ==
- 1994: Governor General's Award for Text in Children's Literature
- 1995: Ruth & Sylvia Schwartz Children's Book Award
- 1995: Canadian Library Association Young Adult Book Award
