= Boy O'Boy =

2003 children's novel by Brian Doyle

- First edition
- Author: Brian Doyle
- Language: English
- Publisher: Douglas & McIntyre
- Publication date: September 2003
- Publication place: United States
- Media type: Paperback and hardback
- Pages: 162 pp (first edition, paperback)
- ISBN: 0-88899-590-3 (first edition, paperback)
- OCLC: 56683247

Boy O'Boy is a 2003 novel by Brian Doyle. It was named Book of the Year for Children by the Canadian Library Association, and won the 2004 Ruth & Sylvia Schwartz Children's Book Awards for Young Adult/Middle Grade Novel.

Martin O'Boy, nicknamed Boy O'Boy, is the young narrator of this story set the summer of 1945. Martin reflects on the ups and downs of his family and neighbours, news from World War II and the popular culture of the day, including Captain Marvel (who shares his name with Martin's friend Billy Batson).

Martin is molested by the church organist who then moves in on Billy. The two boys take their revenge on the man by sabotaging his showpiece at a celebration of the war's end. Martin later confesses what has happened to him to a soldier, a neighbour just returned from the war, who immediately confronts the organist and threatens him if he ever approaches either boy again.

== See also ==
- Pedophilia
