= The Boy from the Sun =

Children's book

The Boy From The Sun
- The-Boy-from-the-Sun-Duncan-Weller
- Author: Duncan Weller
- Illustrator: Duncan Weller
- Language: English
- Genre: Children's picture book
- Published: 2006 (Simply Read Books)
- Publication place: Canada
- Media type: Print (hardback)
- Pages: 36
- ISBN: 1894965337

The Boy from the Sun is a 2006 children's book by Canadian author Duncan Weller.

== Plot ==
Three children sit unenthusiastically on a sidewalk "between home and school." A black cloud forms above their heads and grows larger. The cloud not only represents pollution emanating from the three smoke stacks but the state of mind of the children. The black cloud grows bigger until the Boy from the Sun performs a magic trick. The cloud grows smaller when he takes the three children on a magical journey through a magnificent forest filled with a great variety of people, animals, trees and birds. The journey is taken on a sidewalk, which eventually breaks leaving the children free to play in a field. The Boy from the Sun recites a poem written in iambic pentameter, telling them the value of internalizing the amazing world around them so they can become part of the world through a combination of Chance, Choice and Change. There is a transference of "light" from the Boy from the Sun to the children and the factory returns without the cloud to symbolize the children's control over their state of mind and to suggest that nothing is always perfect: that the black factory of our dark side is always with us, but that we can stop it from clouding our world by experiencing the beauty of the world that keeps us happy and our imaginations keen.

== Reception ==
The Toronto Star wrote "This is a book where the pictures stand out because they look like they were drawn by a kid - but with extra flair." and "It's hard to say if many kids will really relate to the style and story of this book. Young kids will find the poem confusing." The Montreal Gazette called it "an odd little book but a welcome presence in the list of GG nominations for illustrations." and CM: Canadian Review of Materials wrote "the philosophy expressed, while it is worthy, is beyond the understanding of very young children, and yet the book looks like a book designed for young children."

The Boy from the Sun has received a number of awards including the 2008 Ruth and Sylvia Schwartz Children's Book Award and the 2007 Governor General's Literary Award for illustration in children's literature.
