= Francis Browne =

Irish Jesuit priest and photographer

The Reverend Father Francis Browne SJ MC & Bar
- Fr Browne in 1939
- Church: Roman Catholic
- Province: Society of Jesus

Orders
- Ordination: 31 July 1915 by Robert Browne

Personal details
- Born: Francis Patrick Mary Browne; 3 January 1880 Cork, United Kingdom of Great Britain and Ireland
- Died: 7 July 1960 (aged 80) Dublin, Ireland
- Buried: Glasnevin Cemetery, Dublin, Ireland
- Denomination: Roman Catholic
- Parents: Brigid Hegarty and James Browne
- Occupation: Priest
- Known for: Photographing the RMS Titanic during its voyage
- Relatives: Robert Browne, Bishop of Cloyne

Francis Patrick Mary Browne, SJ, MC & Bar (3 January 1880 – 7 July 1960) was an Irish Jesuit and a prolific photographer. His best-known photographs are those of the RMS Titanic and its passengers and crew which he took while a passenger on the ship; he disembarked in Queenstown, four days before the ship sank. He was decorated as a military chaplain during the First World War.

== Early life ==
Francis Browne was born to a wealthy family in 1880 at Buxton House, Cork, Ireland, the youngest of the eight children of James and Brigid (née Hegarty) Browne. His mother was the niece of William Hegarty, Lord Mayor of Cork, and a cousin of Sir Daniel Hegarty, the first Lord Mayor of Cork. She died of puerperal fever eight days after Francis's birth. After the death of his father in a swimming accident at Crosshaven on 2 September 1889, Browne was raised and supported by his uncle, Robert Browne, Bishop of Cloyne, who bought him his first camera shortly before the younger man embarked on a tour of Europe in 1897.

== Education ==
He spent his formative years at Bower Convent, Athlone (1888–91), Belvedere College (1891–92), Christian Brothers College, Cork (1892–1893), St. Vincent's Castleknock College (1893–97), graduating in 1897. He went on the aforementioned tour of Europe, where he began taking photographs.

Upon his return to Ireland, he joined the Jesuits and spent two years in the novitiate at St Stanislaus College, Tullabeg, County Offaly. He attended the Royal University, Dublin, where he was a classmate of James Joyce, who featured him as Mr Browne the Jesuit in Finnegans Wake. In 1909, he visited Rome with his uncle and brother (a bishop and priest respectively), during which they had a private audience with Pope Pius X: the Pope allowed Browne to take his photograph. He studied theology at the Milltown Institute of Theology and Philosophy in Dublin from 1911 to 1916.

== Aboard the Titanic ==
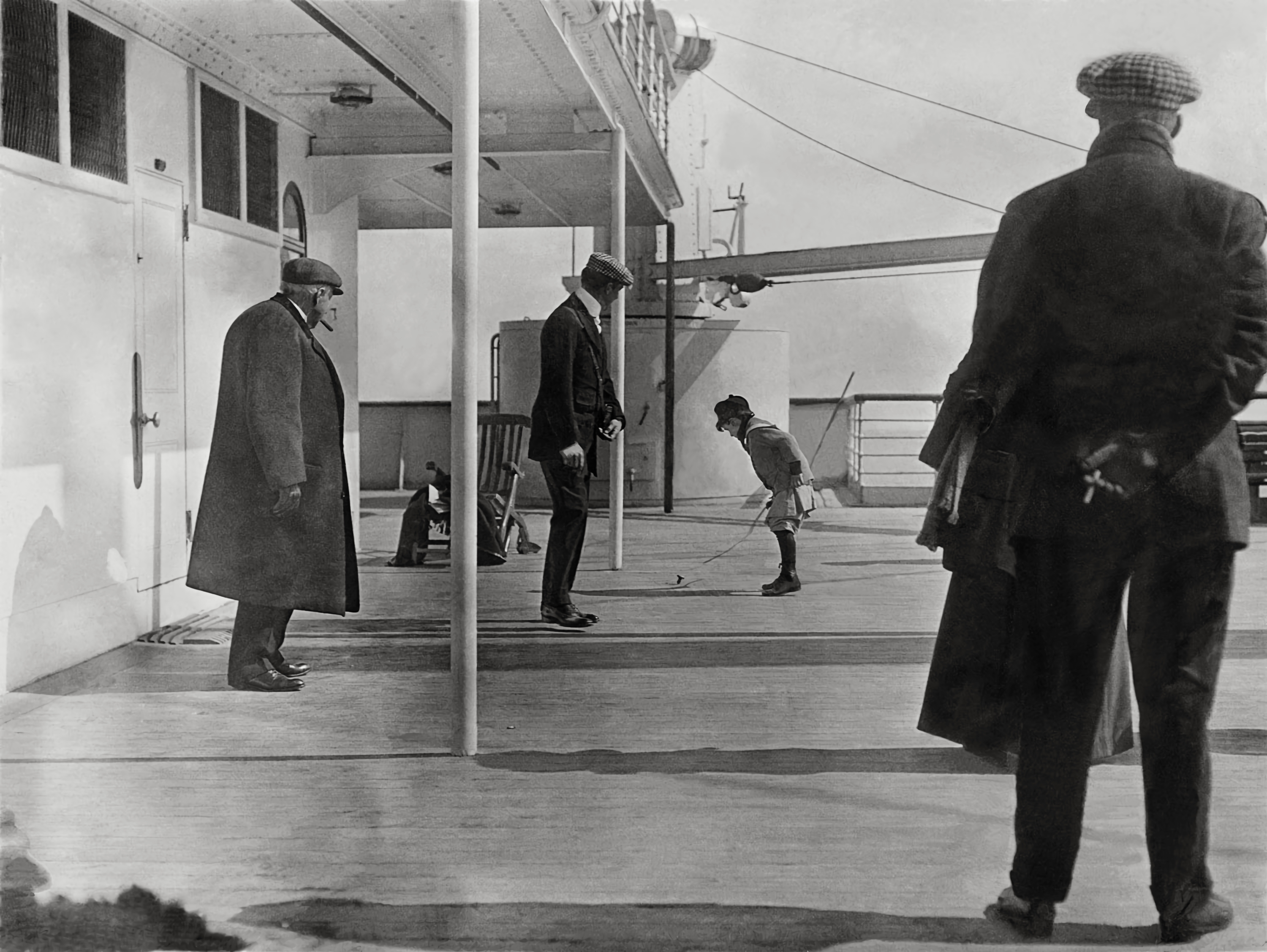
Browne's photograph of Douglas Spedden playing on the deck of RMS Titanic

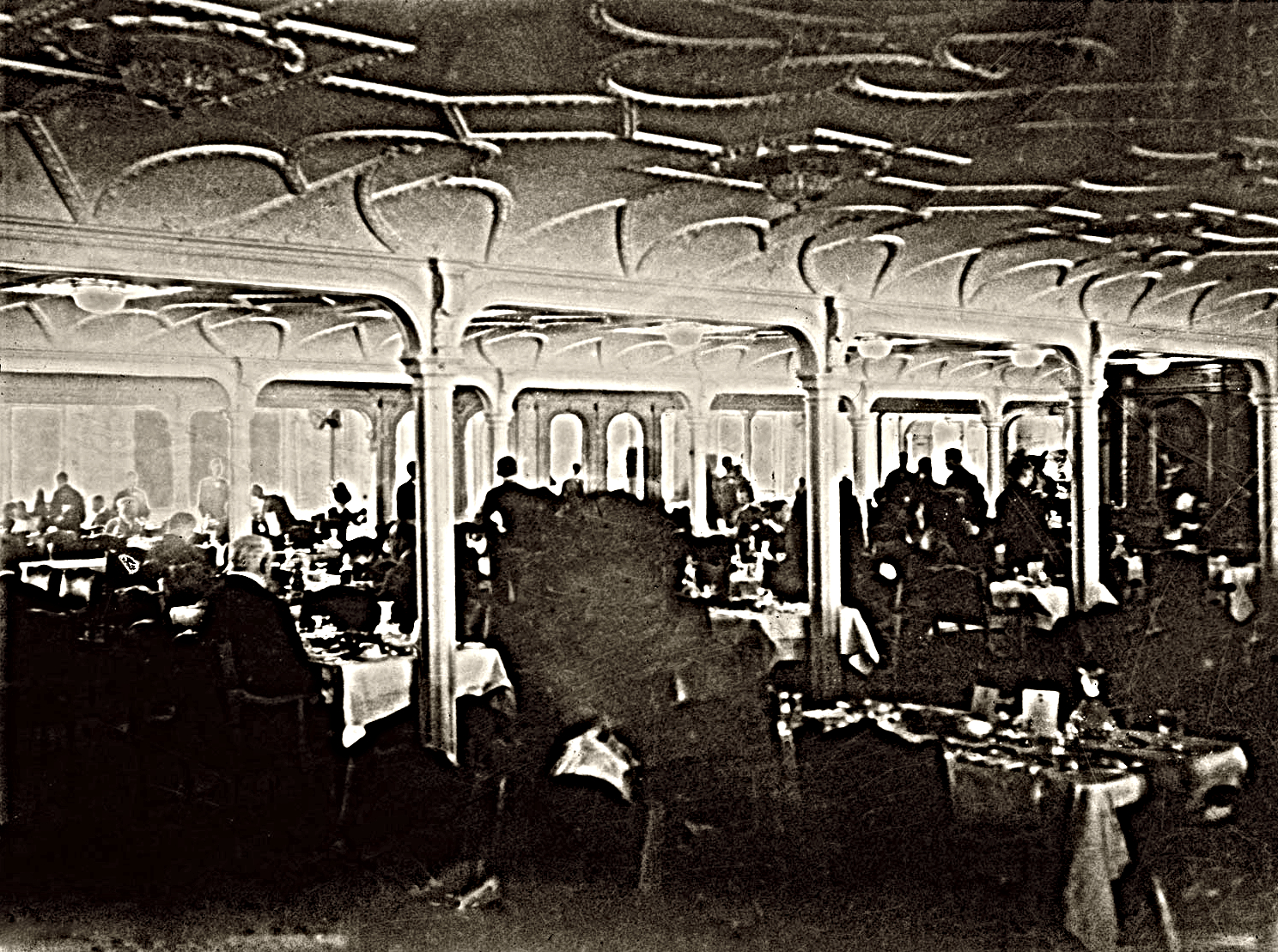
Browne's photograph of the Titanic's first class dining saloon. For a later newspaper publication, the black splotch in the middle would be removed and a figure would be added to the table on the right.

In April 1912 he received a present from his uncle: a ticket for the maiden voyage of RMS Titanic from Southampton, England, to Queenstown, Ireland, via Cherbourg, France. He travelled to Southampton via Liverpool and London, boarding the Titanic on the afternoon of 10 April 1912. He was booked in cabin no. A-37 on the Promenade Deck. Browne took dozens of photographs of life aboard Titanic on that day and the next morning; he shot pictures of the gymnasium, the Marconi room, the first-class dining saloon, his own cabin, and of passengers enjoying walks on the Promenade and Boat decks. He captured the last known images of many crew and passengers, including captain Edward J. Smith, gymnasium manager T. W. McCawley, engineer William Parr, Major Archibald Butt, writer Jacques Futrelle and numerous third-class passengers whose names are unknown.

During his voyage on the Titanic, Browne was befriended by an American millionaire couple who were seated at his table in the liner's first-class dining saloon. They offered to pay his way to New York and back in return for Browne spending the voyage to New York in their company. Browne telegraphed his superior, requesting permission, but the reply was an unambiguous "GET OFF THAT SHIP – PROVINCIAL".

Browne disembarked the Titanic when she docked in Queenstown on 11 April and returned to Dublin to continue his theological studies. When the news of the ship's sinking reached him, he realised that his photos would be of great interest, and he negotiated their sale to various newspapers and news cartels. They appeared in publications around the world. The Eastman Kodak company subsequently gave him free film for life and Browne often contributed to The Kodak Magazine. It is unknown what type of camera Browne used to shoot the famous photos aboard Titanic, nor is it clear where the negatives are of the photographs Browne took on the ship.

== Later life ==
=== First World War ===
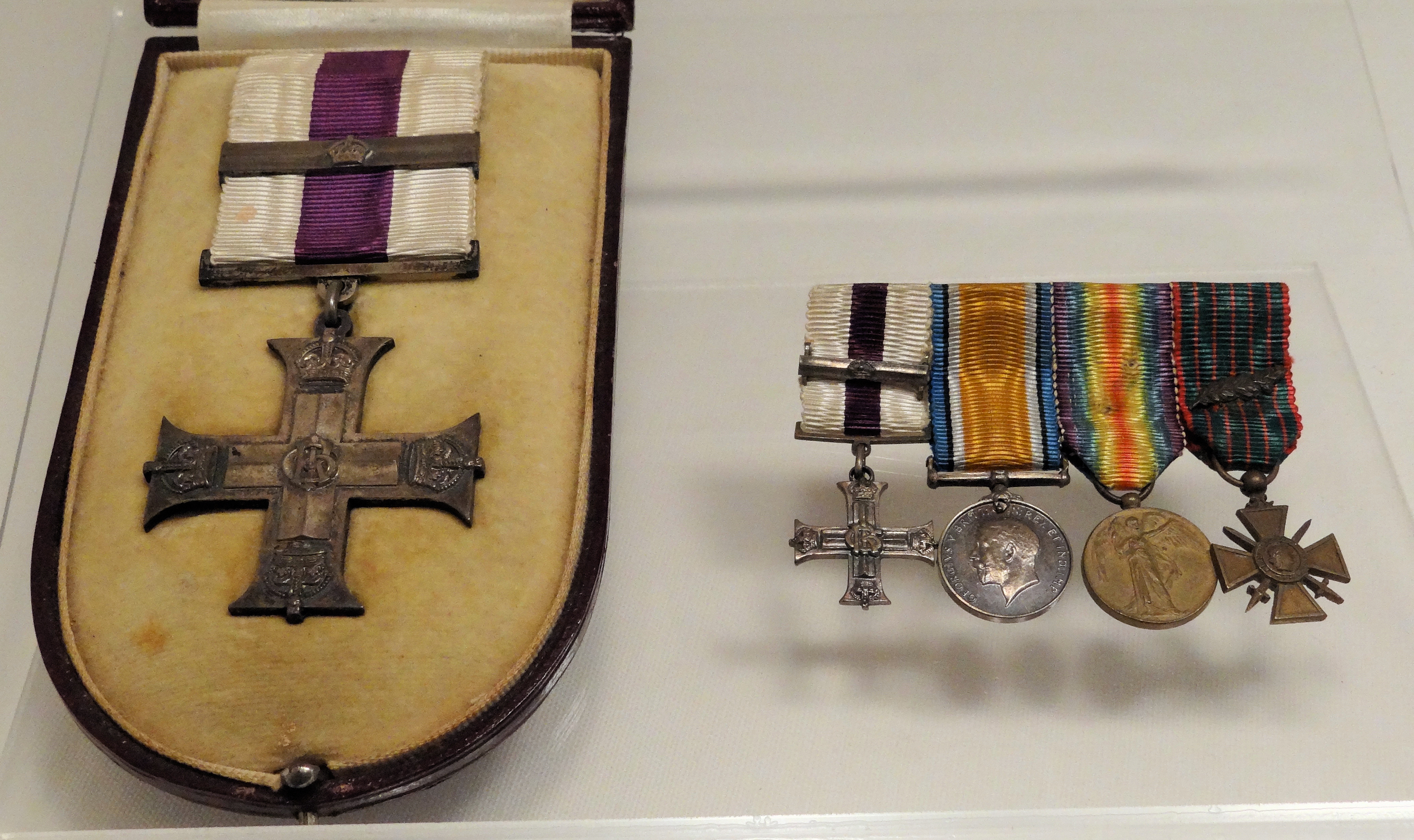
Francis Browne's war decorations, on display at Cobh Heritage Centre

After his ordination on 31 July 1915, he completed his theological studies. In 1916, the 36-year-old Browne was sent to Europe to join the Irish Guards as a chaplain. He served with the Guards until the spring of 1920, including service at the Battle of the Somme and at Locre, Wytschaete, Messines Ridge, Passchendaele, Ypres, Amiens and Arras in Flanders.

Browne was wounded five times during the war, once severely in a gas attack. He was awarded the Military Cross (MC) on 4 June 1917 "for distinguished service in the field". He was awarded a bar to his MC (a second award) on 18 February 1918: his citation read "For conspicuous gallantry and devotion to duty. He was untiring in his efforts to succour the wounded during an attack. His courage and determination under heavy shell-fire were a magnificent example to all." He was also awarded the Croix de Guerre by France.

Browne took many photographs during his time in Europe; one, which he called "Watch on the Rhine", is considered a classic image of World War I. He assembled a collection of his war photographs in an album named after his most famous photograph and distributed copies to his colleagues in the Guards.

=== Post-War ===
After the war, he returned to Dublin, where, in 1922, he was appointed superior of Gardiner Street Church in Dublin. Ill health dogged him, however, and in 1924 it was thought that he would recover more quickly in warmer climes. He was sent on an extended visit to Australia. He took his camera along, photographing life aboard ship and in Cape Town, South Africa, where he broke his voyage. His photographs from Australia covered a cross-section of life in the continent; he took pictures of farms, cattle stations, industries, new immigrants, and members of Irish religious orders who lived in that country.

On his way back to Ireland, he visited Ceylon, Aden, Suez, Saloniki, Naples, Toulon, Gibraltar, Algeciras, and Lisbon, taking photographs of local life and events at every stop. It is estimated that Browne took more than 42,000 photographs during his life.

Browne resumed office as the Superior of Saint Francis Xavier Church, Dublin, upon his return. In 1929 he was appointed to the Retreats and Mission staff of the Irish Jesuits. His work entailed preaching at missions and religious retreats all over Ireland; as most of this work was necessarily performed on evenings and Sundays, he had considerable time to indulge in his hobby during the daytime. He took photographs of many parishes and towns in Ireland, and also photographed in London and East Anglia during his ecclesiastical travels to England.

Archivist David Davison summarised Browne's life work in 2014: "His first pictures in Cobh showed schooners sailing in the port, and by the end of his life, he was photographing Transatlantic aeroplanes at Shannon Airport. He was riveted by all of that".

== Publication of the photographs ==
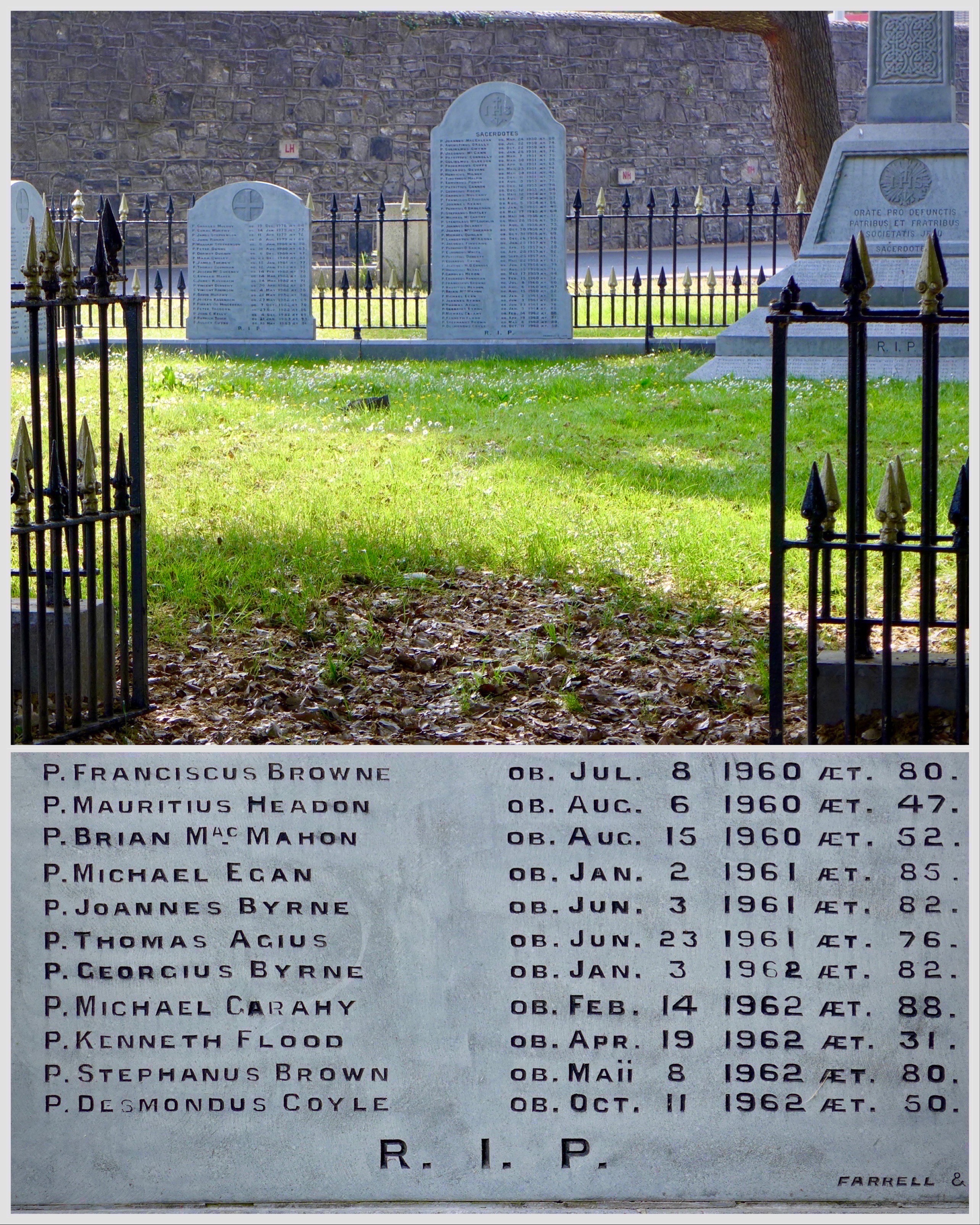
Jesuit plot at Glasnevin Cemetery, Dublin, where Father Browne was buried

Francis Browne died in Dublin in 1960 and was buried in the Jesuit plot in Glasnevin Cemetery in Dublin. His negatives lay forgotten for 25 years after his death; they were found by chance in 1985 when Father Edward E. O'Donnell, SJ, discovered them in a large metal trunk, once belonging to Browne, in the Irish Jesuit archives. "When the trunk was opened in 1985, people compared him to the greats like Henri Cartier-Bresson and Robert Doisneau, but his work predated theirs by decades", archivist David Davison later recalled.

O'Donnell brought the negatives to the attention of several publishers. The Titanic photographs were published in 1997 as Father Browne’s Titanic Album with text by E. E. O'Donnell (Fr. Eddie O’Donnell). In all, at least 25 volumes of Browne's photographs have now been published. The features editor of The Sunday Times of London called this "the photographic equivalent to the discovery of the Dead Sea Scrolls". Many of these books have become best-sellers, the latest being the Centenary Edition of Father Browne's Titanic Album in 2012 by Messenger Publications, Dublin.

The Irish province of the Jesuits (the Society of Jesus), the owner of the negatives pursuant to Browne's will, engaged photographic restoration specialists David and Edwin Davison to preserve and catalogue the fragile and unstable negatives. The Davisons made copies of every negative and are in the process of transferring every usable image to a digital format for future generations. The Davisons later acquired the rights to the photographs and still own the rights as Davison & Associates.

Browne became better known with his appearance (April 2012) on the commonest Irish postage stamp (55 cents) to mark the centenary of the sinking of the Titanic.

The twenty-fifth book of his photographs, Father Browne's Laois, was produced in Dublin by Messenger Publications in October 2013. The same publisher issued an updated biography, The Life and Lens of Father Browne in 2014. An hour-long documentary film on Browne's next book, detailing his experiences as an army chaplain during the Great War, appeared on RTÉ (Ireland's national broadcaster). Father Browne's First World War was then issued by Messenger Publications.

Yale University Press published a volume of Fr Browne's best photographs, entitled Frank Browne: A Life through the Lens, by Colin Ford, E. E. O'Donnell SJ, David Davison (Editor) and Edwin Davison (Editor), in early 2015. An exhibition of these pictures was opened by the Tánaiste (Deputy Prime Minister) of Ireland, Joan Burton, at the Farmleigh Gallery in Dublin, running to Christmas 2014.

During 2015 Browne's Dublin photographs were re-published as was a new selection of his pictures of County Donegal. By April 2016 there were no fewer than five Father Browne Exhibitions circulating in two continents.

In 2016, Messenger Publications published 100 of Browne's photographs of Irish aviation from the early 20th century in Flying with Father Browne, by Eddie O'Donnell SJ.

== Sources ==
- Eaton, John P.; Hass, Charles A. (1995). Titanic: Triumph and Tragedy (2nd ed.). New York: Norton. ISBN 978-0-393-03697-8.
- O'Donnell, E.E. (2000). Father Browne's Ships & Shipping. Dublin: Wolfhound Press. ISBN 978-0-86327-758-0.
- Father Browne's Trains and Railways, currach.ie; accessed 13 August 2014. (Archived link)
