= OCDaniel =

2016 middle-grade novel by Wesley King

- First edition cover
- Author: Wesley King
- Genre: Middle grade fiction
- Publisher: Simon & Schuster Books for Young Readers
- Publication date: April 12, 2016
- Pages: 292
- ISBN: 978-1-481-45531-2

OCDaniel is 2016 middle grade novel by Canadian author Wesley King. Inspired by King's life experiences, the book centres 13-year-old Daniel Leigh as he learns about his obsessive compulsive disorder (OCD). In 2020, King published a prequel, Sara and the Search for Normal.

== Plot ==
OCDaniel centres 13-year-old Daniel Leigh, whose main interests in life include being his football team's backup kicker, spending time with his friends, and the prettiest girl in school, Raya Singh. However, Daniel also experiences what he calls Zaps: an intense feeling that he is doing something terribly wrong. Zaps come at different times and have different stressors, including writing "bad" numbers or stepping off a carpet incorrectly. To help address the Zaps, Daniel has developed Routines that make him feel better. Although the Zaps can be distressing and Daniel doesn't know how to stop them, he has decided they're normal and they're not worth talking to anyone about. Because of this, he does not realize he has OCD.

Although most people in Daniel's life are unaware of his behaviours and routines, one person at school begins to notice: the girl nicknamed "Psycho Sara", who has bipolar disorder, anxiety disorder, schizophrenia, and depression. One day, Sara decides to start talking with Daniel and asks him for help as she believes her mother's new boyfriend murdered her father. As the friendship develops between Sara and Daniel, she mentions he may have OCD, which helps open a path toward coping.

== Background ==
Wesley King has described OCDaniel as semi-biographical because he has OCD and did not realize until he was in his mid-teens that his thoughts and compulsions were atypical.

== Reception ==
=== Reviews ===
OCDaniel was generally well received by critics, including a starred review from Booklist, whose Carolyn Phelan wrote,

King creates convincing characters and writes engaging dialogue, and whether or not readers identify fully with Daniel, they will see parts of themselves in this vulnerable protagonist. Clues dropped in the first part of the book may lead readers to expect a conventional sort of happy ending, but the story's conclusion is more complex and satisfying. Written from Daniel's point of view, this perceptive first-person narrative is sometimes painful, sometimes amusing, and always rewarding.

Nathan Whitlock, writing for Quill & Quire described OCDaniel as "a sensitive, occasionally painful story" that "uses humour and realism to fight stigmas and stereotypes about people who suffer from mental illness". Meanwhile, Kirkus Reviews called the novel "part coming-of-age, part mystery, and part middle-grade social-problem". They noted that "Daniel's narration is charming, funny, and occasionally heartbreaking," and "everything works, save for periodic excerpts of Daniel's writing, which are more distracting than helpful."

Reviewing the audiobook narrated by Ramón de Ocampo, Booklist's Margaux Morrone highlighted how "de Ocampo's earnest voice projects all of Daniel's exuberant highs [...] and gut-wrenching lows."

=== Awards and honours ===
In 2017, the Bank Street College of Education named OCDaniel one of the year's best books for readers aged 12 to 14.

Awards for OCDaniel
| Year | Award | Result | Ref. |
|---|---|---|---|
| 2017 | Ruth & Sylvia Schwartz Children's Book Award for Middle Grade/Young | Winner | |
| 2017 | Forest of Reading Silver Birch Award | Winner | |
| 2017 | Edgar Allan Poe Award for Best Juvenile | Winner | |

== Prequel ==
King published a prequel to OCDaniel titled Sara and the Search for Normal in 2020. In addition to receiving a starred review from School Library Journal, Sara and the Search for Normal won the 2021 Ruth & Sylvia Schwartz Children's Book Award for Middle Grade/Young Adult Literature. The novel was also nominated for the Forest of Reading Red Maple Award, and Bank Street College of Education named it one of the year's best books for readers aged 9 to 12.
