= Little Red Lies =

2013 novel by Julie Johnston

- First edition
- Author: Julie Johnston
- Language: English
- Genre: Young adult historical novel
- Publisher: McClelland & Stewart
- Publication date: 2013
- Publication place: Canada
- Media type: Print
- Pages: 340 pp
- ISBN: 9781770493131
- OCLC: 877910198

Little Red Lies is a 2013 young adult novel by Canadian author Julie Johnston. The coming of age novel is set immediately after World War II in a small Canadian town.

== Plot summary ==
Rachel McLaren as she navigates her relationships with her brother Jamie, her inappropriate high school drama teacher, her parents, and others.

== Reception ==
Reviews of Little Red Lies have been mostly positive with starred reviews from Kirkus Reviews, and Booklist.

Voice of Youth Advocates was impressed, writing, "the plethora of plot threads could turn into bathos but Johnston weaves them into a believable, engaging story." School Library Journal found it "a quiet, thoughtful novel, with more introspection than action".

Little Red Lies has also been reviewed by Publishers Weekly, The Horn Book Magazine, The Bulletin of the Center for Children's Books, and the Historical Novels Review.

Little Red Lies was a finalist for the 2014 Ruth & Sylvia Schwartz Children's Book Award for Young Adult/Middle Grade Novel.
