= A Leaf in the Bitter Wind =

1997 memoir by Ting-Xing Ye

- Author: Ting-Xing Ye
- Language: English
- Genre: Autobiography, Cultural Revolution memoir, Communism in China
- Publisher: Bantam Books
- Publication date: 1997
- Publication place: Canada
- Media type: Print (Paperback, 1 volume)
- Pages: 486
- ISBN: 0-553-81306-4
- OCLC: 59456198

A Leaf in the Bitter Wind is the 1997 personal memoir of Chinese-Canadian author Ting-Xing Ye's life in China from her birth in Shanghai to her eventual escape to Canada in 1987.

== Synopsis ==
Ting-Xing Ye was the fourth daughter of a factory owner, and she and her siblings were branded as the children of capitalists and persecuted during the Cultural Revolution. By the time Ye turned thirteen, both her parents had died while her family was torn apart by the Revolution. Along with millions of other Chinese youths, Ye was "sent down" from the city for labor reform on a prison farm, where she was subjected to humiliating psychological torture. Later, Ye was accepted into Beijing University where she studied English before being assigned to the Foreign Ministry as a translator for the delegations of such dignitaries as Queen Elizabeth II, Ronald Reagan and Imelda Marcos. Ye left China for Canada in 1987.

=== Domestic abuse ===
In addition to Ye's life in China before and during the Cultural Revolution, the book also documents the domestic abuse she suffered during her first marriage. Ye and her first husband had one daughter, as permitted by China's one-child policy. Later, Ye was forced to abort a second pregnancy as it was not permitted by government policy. Ye describes how her husband repeatedly beat her in front of her daughter, and insisted that a close male friend share their cramped living quarters. Ye became increasingly estranged from her husband and spent significant periods of time apart from him during her postgraduate studies in Beijing. During her studies, Ye fell in love with her Canadian English teacher, William Bell, and eventually defected to the West to be with him, gaining permission to leave China under the guise of a fully paid scholarship to York University in Canada. However, to do so, she had to leave her daughter in the custody of her husband. When it became clear that Ye did not intend to return permanently to China, her husband denied her access to her daughter, changing her name and moving to a new, secret address to avoid the possibility of contact with Ye.

Ye ends her memoir with her descriptions of how, as a Canadian citizen, she continues to attempt to contact her daughter, hoping one day to take her to Canada.

== Reception ==
A Leaf in the Bitter Wind received positive reviews from professional critics, who praised the book's ability to engross readers despite the difficult subject matter. The Barrie Examiner described it as "fascinating yet horrifying", while a review appearing in Cityview called it "a page-turner that can be enjoyed as exquisite grassroots history, or as the simple story of one woman’s triumph over brutish odds".

Writing for the Ottawa Citizen, Patrick Kavanagh claimed that "Ting-Xing Ye tells her story with such vividness of imagery and such a galloping momentum that the narrative reads like splendid fiction".
