= Stones (novel) =

Young adult novel by William E. Bell

- Author: William E. Bell
- Language: English
- Genre: Young adult fiction
- Publisher: Seal Books
- Publication date: 2001
- Publication place: Canada
- Media type: Print (Paperback)
- ISBN: 978-0-7704-2875-4

Stones is a young adult novel by the Canadian author William E. Bell centred on the stoning of a Haitian woman in Orillia, Ontario in the 19th century. The novel, narrated by the teenage character Garnet Havelock, explores the themes of racism, religious intolerance and the debate between scientific reason and religious faith.

The book has been positively reviewed as accessible and highly involving, and appealing to a wide age of readers, as well as being a suspenseful, absorbing read. On the other hand, the novel has been criticised for having "not nearly enough of the ineffable spirit of a truly haunting ghost story".

The novel won the Young Adult Book Award in 2002.

A sequel to this novel, Fanatics, was published in 2011.
