= Monique Corriveau =

Canadian writer

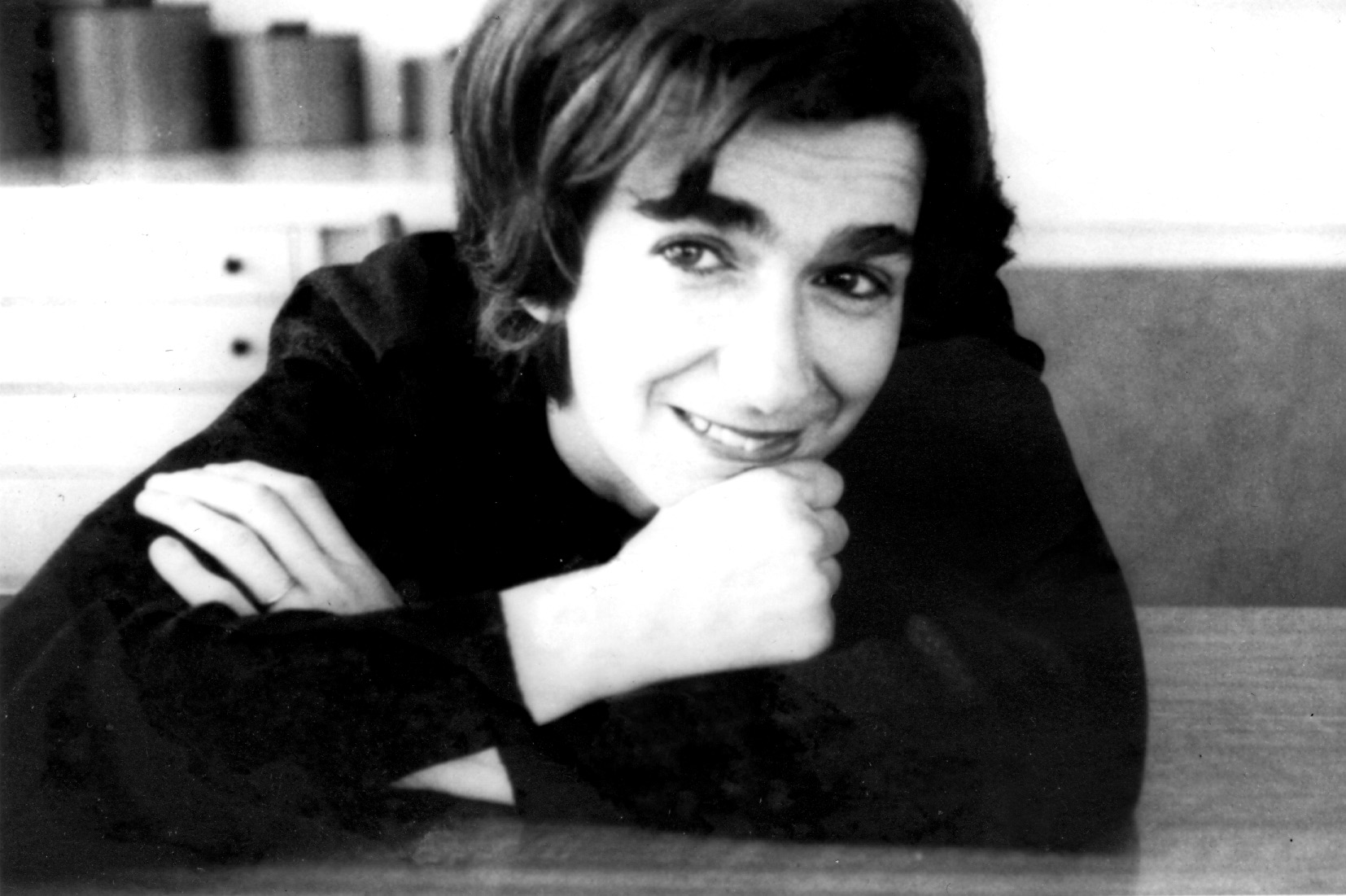
- Born: Monique Chouinard; September 6, 1927; Quebec City, Quebec, Canada
- Died: June 29, 1976 (aged 48); Quebec City, Quebec, Canada
- Writing career
- Genre: youth fiction

Monique Corriveau (September 6, 1927 – June 29, 1976) was an award-winning Canadian writer living in Quebec. She mainly published books for young people.

The daughter of François-Xavier Chouinard, a lawyer, and Bernadette Rouillard, she was born Monique Chouinard in Quebec City. Her sister Suzanne Martel was also a writer. She studied with the Ursulines of Quebec, at St. Joseph's College in Toronto and at the Université Laval.

Corriveau began writing science fiction during the 1970s. Her Compagnon du soleil trilogy is considered by some to be her best work in this genre.

In 1951, she married Bernard Corriveau, a notary; the couple had ten children, including animator and artist Thomas Corriveau.

She received a number of awards for her work including:

- the prize of the Association canadienne d'éducation de langue française for Le Secret de Vanille in 1958 and for Les Jardiniers du hibou in 1960
- the Prix David from Quebec for Le Wapiti in 1964 and for Le Maitre de Messire in 1966
- the Book of the Year for Children Award from the Canadian Library Association for Le Wapiti in 1966
- the Prix Michelle-Le Normand in 1971
- the Prix Alvine-Bélisle in 1976 (posthumously)

Corriveau died of cancer in Quebec City at the age of 48.

A library named after her was established in Sainte-Foy, now part of Quebec City.

== Selected works ==
- La Petite Fille du printemps (1966)
- Le Wapiti (1968)
- Le Témoin (1969)
- Le Garçon au cerf-volant (1974)
- Les Saisons de la mer (1975)
- Patrick et Sophie en fusée (1975)
