= William Bell (author) =

Canadian children's writer (1945–2016)

- Born: 27 October 1945; Toronto, Ontario
- Died: 30 July 2016 (aged 70); Orillia, Ontario
- Education: University of Toronto (M.A., 1969; M.Ed., 1984)
- Occupations: Teacher, Author
- Spouses: Susan Arnup; Ting-Xing Ye
- Children: 3
- Writing career
- Genre: Children's Literature

William Edwin Bell (27 October 1945 – 30 July 2016) was a Canadian author of young adult fiction, born in Toronto, Ontario. He lived in Orillia, Ontario.

== Personal life and education ==
Bell was born in Toronto on 27 October 1945 to William B. and Irene (nee Spowart) Bell. He attended New Toronto Secondary School, which inspired his novel Crabbe. In 1969, he received a Master of Arts in literature from the University of Toronto, and in 1984, he received a Master of Education in education curriculum and administration from the university's Ontario Institute for Studies in Education.

He married Susan Arnup and had three children: Dylan, Megan and Brendan. Before his death, he lived with his wife, Chinese-Canadian author Ting-Xing Ye. He died in Orillia on 30 July 2016 at the age of 70.

== Career ==
=== Teaching ===
Bell taught in a variety of settings. He was a high school teacher at several schools in Simcoe County and the head of the English department at Orillia District Collegiate & Vocational Institute. In the early 1980s, he taught English in China at the Harbin University of Science and Technology and the Foreign Affairs College. He also worked at the University of British Columbia and the Simcoe County Board of Education. He was frequently invited to give presentations at conferences and to speak to elementary and secondary school students on creative writing.

=== Writing ===
The inspiration to become a writer came to Bell when he heard a speech by John Metcalf, author of one of his favourite short stories. Bell said he likes to write for young people because they are "the best audience: they are loyal to the writers they like and they are enthusiastic readers".

Bell wrote many books, including three set near his home in Orillia, Ontario (Five Days of the Ghost, Stones and Fanatics), two in Barrie (Death Wind, The Cripples' Club), one in Toronto (Julian) and one in Fergus (Zack).

Bell's work has been widely published outside of Canada. His books have been translated into Chinese, French, German, Spanish, Polish, Swedish, Finnish, Norwegian, Danish, Dutch and Japanese.

== Awards and honors ==
Awards for Bell's writing
| Year | Title | Award | Result | Ref. |
|---|---|---|---|---|
| 1991 | Forbidden City | Ruth and Sylvia Schwartz Children’s Book Award | Winner | |
| 1992 | Five Days of the Ghost | Manitoba Young Readers' Choice Award | Winner | |
| 1993 | Forbidden City | Belgium Prize for Excellence | Winner | |
| 1993 | Forbidden City | Manitoba Young Readers' Choice Award | Nominee | |
| 1995 | No Signature | Manitoba Young Readers' Choice Award | Nominee | |
| 1999 | Zack | Forest of Reading Red Maple Award | Finalist | |
| 1999 | Zack | Mr. Christie's Book Awards | Winner | |
| 2002 | Stones | Canadian Library Association Young Adult Book Award | Winner | |
| 2002 | Stones | Forest of Reading Red Maple Award | Finalist | |
| 2003 | Stones | Manitoba Young Readers' Choice Award | Honour | |
| 2005 | Throwaway Daughter | Manitoba Young Readers' Choice Award | Nominee | |
| 2007 | The Blue Helmet | Canadian Library Association Young Adult Book Award | Winner | |
| 2008 | The Blue Helmet | Manitoba Young Readers' Choice Award | Nominee | |
| 2011 | Only in the Movies | Forest of Reading Red Maple Award | Finalist | |
| 2012 | Fanatics | Canadian Library Association Young Adult Book Award | Shortlist | |
| 2012 | Fanatics | Forest of Reading Red Maple Award | Finalist | |
| 2015 | Julian | John Spray Mystery Award | Winner | |
| 2015 | Julian | Ruth and Sylvia Schwartz Children’s Book Award for Young Adult/Middle Reader | Shortlist | |

== Books ==
- Crabbe - 1986
- Metal Head - 1987
- The Cripples' Club - 1988 (reissued in 1993 as Absolutely Invincible)
- Death Wind - 1989
- Five Days of the Ghost - 1989
- Forbidden City - 1990
- No Signature - 1992
- Speak to the Earth - 1994
- The Golden Disk - 1995 (a picture book)
- River My Friend - 1996 (a picture book)
- Zack - 1998
- Stones - 2001
- Alma - 2003
- Throwaway Daughter – 2003 (written with his wife Ting-Xing Ye)
- Just Some Stuff I Wrote - 2005
- The Blue Helmet - 2006
- Only in the Movies - 2010
- Fanatics - 2011
- Julian - 2014
