= Fulvio Caccia =

Italian Canadian writer

External videos
- ... e cultura politica": Fulvio Caccia, RSI

Fulvio Caccia (born 10 January 1952, in Florence, Italy) is a contemporary Italian Canadian poet, novelist and essayist. He won the 1994 Prix du Gouverneur Général.

== Biography ==
Fulvio Caccia graduated from l'Université du Québec à Montréal in 1979. He lives in Paris.

== Works ==
- Irpinia, (Guernica, 1983)
- Scirocco (Triptyque, 1985)
- Aknos, (Guernica, 1994, Prix du Gouverneur-général du Canada)
- La chasse spirituelle, (le Noroît, 2005)
- Golden Eighties, un recueil de nouvelles (Montréal, Balzac 1994)
- La république métis (Balzac en 1997)
- La ligne gothique (Tryptique, 2004)
- La coïncidence (2005)
- Le secret, publié à l’automne 2006
- Bruno Ramirez et Lamberto Tassinari La transculture et viceversa (Triptyque, Montréal 2010)
- Italie et Autres Voyages (le Noroît, Montréal / Bruno Doucey, Paris 2010)
