= Donna McFarlane =

Canadian writer (born 1958)

- Born: 1958 (age 67–68); Quebec, Canada
- Occupation: novelist
- Writing career
- Period: 1990s
- Notable work: Division of Surgery

Donna McFarlane (born 1958) is a Canadian writer, who was a shortlisted nominee for the Governor General's Award for English-language fiction at the 1994 Governor General's Awards for her novel Division of Surgery. Published by Women's Press of Canada, Division of Surgery was an autobiographical novel about McFarlane's own experience in the medical system after being diagnosed with Crohn's disease.

Born in Quebec and raised in Ottawa, McFarlane graduated from York University in 1982 with a Bachelor of Fine Arts, and was working as a librarian at the time of her Crohn's diagnosis. The novel began life as a journal that she kept during her hospital stays, and later submitted to CKLN-FM after Arnie Achtman's documentary series Life Rattle broadcast a story about another woman battling chronic illness. Achtman helped McFarlane organize her notes into a novel, and later became McFarlane's partner.

The doctor in the novel, known only by the name "The Prophet", was based on Mount Sinai Hospital surgeon Zane Cohen.

At the time of her award nomination, she was working as a program coordinator for Windfall, a charity organization that distributed clothing to needy women. She subsequently published a number of short stories in literary magazines, but has not published any further books.
