= Polly Fleck =

Canadian poet (1933–2019)

Margaret Louise (Polly) Fleck (1933–2019) was a Canadian poet. She was most noted for her poetry collection The Chinese Execution, which was shortlisted for the Governor General's Award for English-language poetry at the 1994 Governor General's Awards.

The wife of Paul Fleck, a president of the Banff Centre for Arts and Creativity, she published her first poetry collection Polychronicon in 1984. Following her husband's death in 1992, she was active in the Fleck Family Foundation, which endowed the Banff Centre's Fleck Fellowships and launched the Norma Fleck Award for children's literature.
