= Forbidden City (novel) =

1990 novel by William E. Bell

- Author: William E. Bell
- Cover artist: World Wide Photos
- Language: English
- Genre: Semi-Fiction
- Publisher: Seal Books by arrangement with Doubleday Canada
- Publication date: 1990
- Publication place: Canada
- Media type: Print (Paperback)
- Pages: 274
- ISBN: 0-7704-2813-4

Forbidden City is a novel by Canadian author William Bell, based on the events of the Tiananmen Square massacre in 1989. It is a story of maturation/coming of age.

The book is the winner of the Ruth Schwartz Children's Book Award, the Belgium Prize for Excellence, and several other awards.

The book is often included in reading material for Canadian schools.

The book is currently banned in China.
