= List of Scaredy Squirrel episodes =

The following is a list of episodes for the YTV animated television series, Scaredy Squirrel. The series follows the wisecracking adventures of Scaredy, an American red squirrel and his best friend Dave, a blue striped skunk. It was produced by Nelvana, in association with YTV, with additional production facilities provided by Studio 306, Pipeline Studios Inc. and Super Sonics Productions Inc., Dolby Digital doing the sound, Writers Guild of Canada, Diramix and ACTRA writing the show's renewal plates, and The Canada Media Fund and The Canadian Film or Video Production Tax Credit providing the series' funding. The series premiered on YTV in Canada on April 1, 2011, and on Cartoon Network in the United States on August 9, 2011. It ended on YTV in Canada on August 17, 2013, and in the United States on June 20, 2013.

== Series overview ==
Scaredy Squirrel series overview
Season	Episodes	Originally aired			
Season	Episodes	First aired (Canada)	Last aired (Canada)	First aired (U.S.)	Last aired (U.S.)
1	26	April 1, 2011	December 2, 2011	August 9, 2011	December 4, 2011
2	14	September 9, 2012	March 16, 2013	June 3, 2013	June 20, 2013
3	12	June 1, 2013	August 17, 2013	September 2, 2014	September 17, 2014

== Episodes ==
=== Season 1 (2011) ===
No. overall	No. in season	Title	Canadian original air date	U.S. original air date	Prod. code	U.S. viewers (in millions)
1	1	"Pranks for Nothing" "Fistful of Quarters"	April 1, 2011	November 3, 2011	118	N/A
"Pranks for Nothing" – Scaredy and Paddy get into a prank war. "Fistful of Quarters" – Scaredy helps Dave find the perfect job when he runs out of quarters for his fire truck.
2	2	"Children of the Acorn" "Awaken the Stacker Within"	April 3, 2011	November 17, 2011	109	N/A
"Children of the Acorn" – After searching every dangerous corner of Balsa City, Scaredy has to entertain a little girl in order to win back the acorn hat he needs to complete his collection. "Awaken the Stacker Within" – Scaredy meets his hero, Lars Von Stacking, and attempts to help the former star rebuild his confidence as well as his greatest achievement, the Broccolisseum.
3	3	"Way of the Fishlips" "The Golden Paddleball"	April 10, 2011	November 10, 2011	104	N/A
"Way of the Fishlips" – Scaredy needs help getting Rex to stop bullying him. "The Golden Paddleball" – Scaredy and Paddy share a paddle ball.
4	4	"Luck Be a Penny" "How to Succeed in Groceries"	April 17, 2011	October 18, 2011	102	N/A
"Luck Be a Penny" – Scaredy loses his lucky penny and receives bad luck. "How to Succeed in Groceries" – Running a rule-free Stash N' Hoard is not all that easy.
5	5	"Lumberjack Day" "Suggestion Box Blues"	April 24, 2011	November 21, 2011	111	N/A
"Lumberjack Day" – Scaredy tries to rid a sacred holiday of commercialization. "Suggestion Box Blues" – Scaredy gets a suggestion box.
6	6	"Tubtastic Tuo" "Mrs. Nestor's Mother's Momma"	May 1, 2011	November 30, 2011	120	N/A
"Tubtastic Tuo" – Momma forces Scaredy and Nestor to become a team. "Mrs. Nestor's Mother's Momma" – Scaredy loses Nestor's grandmother.
7	7	"Sticky Situation" "Cowlicked"	May 8, 2011	September 20, 2011	101	N/A
"Sticky Situation" – Scaredy gets a stain on his uniform and does anything he can in order to hide it. "Cowlicked" – Scaredy gets his fur cowlicked, and needs it to be flat again in order to enter a paddle ball tournament.
8	8	"Water Damage" "Life Saver"	May 15, 2011	November 11, 2011	105	N/A
"Water Damage" – Scaredy loses his job when his ears are blocked by water. "Life Saver" – Sally becomes Scaredy's personal helper trout.
9	9	"Who's Your Paddy?" "Snerd Envy"	May 22, 2011	August 16, 2011	107	N/A
"Who's Your Paddy?" – Scaredy has to fight for his job. "Snerd Envy" – Scaredy wants to be included when a new toy becomes a hit.
10	10	"Dream Weaver" "Chili Con Scaredy"	May 29, 2011	August 30, 2011	114	1.147
"Dream Weaver" – Scaredy tries to make Nestor's dreams come true. "Chili Con Scaredy" – After his wallet is stolen, Scaredy must work at a chili place, but he ends up revealing that his new boss has been stealing wallets.
11	11	"The Coast Is Fear" "The Madness of King Nutbar"	June 5, 2011	August 9, 2011	108	N/A
"The Coast Is Fear" – Scaredy is afraid of going on a roller coaster. "The Madness of King Nutbar" – A king's insanity causes a candy bar to discontinue.
12	12	"There Is No "I" in Groceries" "When Thugs Attack"	June 12, 2011	August 9, 2011	113	N/A
"There Is No "I" in Groceries" – Scaredy works for a rival grocery store with a strangely familiar staff. "When Thugs Attack" – Rumors about a gang get out of control.
13	13	"Camp or Consequences" "Fairweather Squirrel"	June 19, 2011	August 23, 2011	112	N/A
"Camp or Consequences" – The campsite becomes more strict when paddle balls are taken away. "Fairweather Squirrel" – Scaredy becomes the new TV weatherman.
14	14	"Aisle of the Dead" "Where the Stink At?"	October 12, 2011	October 4, 2011/October 28, 2011	117	N/A
"Aisle of the Dead" – Everyone in Balsa City becomes zombies. "Where the Stink At?" – Dave can no longer fart.
15	15	"Stackinator" "Halloweekend"	October 31, 2011	October 31, 2011/October 11, 2011	121	N/A
"Stackinator" – Scaredy is replaced by a robot at work. "Halloweeked" – Scaredy is determined to scare someone on Halloween.
16	16	"Rockabye Rock" "Hammock Havoc"	November 1, 2011	November 1, 2011	115	N/A
"Rockabye Rock" – Scaredy takes care of a rock while Richard is away for the weekend. "Hammock Havoc" – The robot that came with Scaredy's hammock is too pushy.
17	17	"It's Not Easy Being Green" "The Corgin"	November 2, 2011	November 2, 2011	116	N/A
"It's Not Easy Being Green" – Scaredy tries to help grow Richard taller for a contest. "The Corgin" – Scaredy and Dave go to the mountains.
18	18	"Nothing But the Tooth" "From Rodent with Love"	November 4, 2011	November 4, 2011	119	N/A
"Nothing But the Tooth" – Scaredy loses a tooth and tries to dupe the Molar Owl. "From Rodent With Love" – Scaredy uncovers Mildred's secret spy persona.
19	19	"Paddle Dogs" "Looking for Richard"	November 9, 2011	November 6, 2011/November 9, 2011	103	N/A
"Paddle Dogs" – Dave gets a job as a towel boy for the Paddle Dogs. "Looking for Richard" – Scaredy looks for a lost Richard.
20	20	"Fancy Some Tea?" "Mr. Perfect Balsa"	November 14, 2011	November 14, 2011	106	N/A
"Fancy Some Tea?" – The store is getting too fancy. "Mr. Perfect Balsa" – Scaredy regrets signing up for the Mr. Perfect Balsa Competition.
21	21	"Shop Cop" "Acting Silly"	November 18, 2011	November 18, 2011	110	N/A
"Shop Cop" – Scaredy becomes the security guard for the store. "Acting Silly" – Scaredy develops a crush on a female squirrel, which makes Sally very jealous.
22	22	"Seth Is a Salesman" "Less Nestorman"	November 28, 2011	November 28, 2011	124	N/A
"Seth Is a Salesman" – A smooth salesman dupes Scaredy. "Less Nestorman" – Nestor loses his job to his brother, Lestor.
23	23	"Neat Wits" "Mall Rats"	November 29, 2011	November 29, 2011	125	N/A
"Neat Wits" – Scaredy coaches Dave in an attempt to win cleaning supplies. "Mall Rat" – Scaredy learns a secret about Paddy.
24	24	"The Great Mistack" "A Squirreled Away Treasure"	November 30, 2011	November 30, 2011	126	N/A
"The Great Mistack" – Dave becomes a celebrity, which takes a toll on his friendship with Scaredy. "A Squirreled Away Treasure" – A treasure map leads to an adventure.
25	25	"Perfect Pickle" "Goat Police"	December 1, 2011	December 2, 2011	122	N/A
"Perfect Pickle" – A search for a perfect pickle lands Scaredy in trouble. "Goat Police" – Scaredy recreates his favorite cop drama.
26	26	"Jawhead" "Store Wars"	December 2, 2011	December 4, 2011	123	N/A
"Jawhead" – Scaredy lands a job protecting Balsa City from a river monster. "Store Wars" – Two stores compete to reach a million customers.

=== Season 2 (2012–13) ===
No. overall	No. in season	Title	Canadian original air date	U.S. original air date	Prod. code	U.S. viewers (in millions)
1	27	"Grand Olde Grocery" "Grounded Hog"	September 9, 2012	June 3, 2013	201	0.765
"Grand Olde Grocery" – Scaredy regrets getting Sally a singing job. "Grounded Hog" – Balsa's groundhog is a monster.
2	28	"The Talented Mr. Peacock" "Hiccup Hicdown in Balsatown"	September 16, 2012	June 4, 2013	202	0.960
"The Talented Mr. Peacock" – Scaredy and Philmore partner up for a doubles paddle ball tournament. "Hiccup Hicdown in Balsatown" – Scaredy tries to cure Dave's hiccups before everyone goes crazy.
3	29	"Lean Green Fighting Machine" "Nutter's Almanac"	September 23, 2012	June 5, 2013	203	1.111
"Lean Green Fighting Machine" – A mad man wants to eat the world's strongest plant. "Nutter's Almanac" – A book that predicts future weather is found.
4	30	"I Think Therefore I Clean" "Soup of a Nova"	September 30, 2012	June 6, 2013	204	1.064
"I Think Therefore I Clean" – Scaredy's new vacuum takes over Balsa City. "Soup of a Nova" – Scaredy tries to find Dave a new place to live.
5	31	"Extrasquirrelstial" "To Cat a Thief"	January 12, 2013	June 7, 2013	205	1.428
"Extrasquirrelstial" – Alien Squirrels arrive in Balsa. "To Cat a Thief" – Scaredy finds out that someone is planning to steal the Leaning Tower of Pizza.
6	32	"Inskunktion" "Double Double Squirrel in Trouble"	January 19, 2013	June 10, 2013	206	1.519
"Inskunktion" – Scaredy has to wake up Dave by going into his dreams. "Double Double Squirrel in Trouble" – Scaredy switches places with a movie star.
7	33	"Empty Nestor Syndrome" "A New Dave"	January 26, 2013	June 11, 2013	207	1.373
"Empty Nestor Syndrome" – Momma makes Scaredy her new son when Nestor moves out. "A New Dave" – Dave becomes a jerk when he starts riding a motorcycle.
8	34	"Breaking the Mold" "Hip to Be Squirrel"	February 2, 2013	June 12, 2013	208	1.600
"Breaking the Mold" – Scaredy battles a mold that everyone else in Balsa has fallen in love with. "Hip to Be Squirrel" – When the Stash N' Hoard is deemed unhip by a TV trend setter Scaredy has to save the store from being closed.
9	35	"Captain Nuts" "Nobody Loves Hatton"	February 14, 2013	June 18, 2013	212	1.148
"Captain Nuts" – Scaredy believes a bug bite gave him superpowers. "Nobody Loves Hatton" – Scaredy finds out that Hatton has been skipping the Stash N' Hoard Valentine's Dance.
10	36	"Stash n' Hoarder" "Ice Ice Scaredy"	February 16, 2013	June 13, 2013	209	1.299
"Stash n' Hoarder" – Scaredy tries not to hoard acorns as fall approaches. "Ice Ice Scaredy" – Scaredy must face a haunting memory if he wants his friends to win an ice skating competition.
11	37	"The Paddy Party Problem" "Hamsticorn"	February 23, 2013	June 14, 2013	210	1.116
"The Paddy Party Problem" – Upon realizing that he has never thrown a good party, Scaredy wants to show everyone that he can. "Hamsticorn" – A mysterious creature that only Scaredy can see seems to be picking on him for no reason.
12	38	"Freaky Fur Day" "Mascot in the Act"	March 2, 2013	June 17, 2013	211	1.031
"Freaky Fur Day" – Scaredy and Dave magically switch bodies and need to switch back before Dave is due to compete in a grotesque hotdog eating contest. "Mascot in the Act" – Scaredy gets a mascot job and then discovers the team isn't as good as they seem.
13	39	"Double Oh Oops" "Stack to School"	March 9, 2013	June 19, 2013	213	1.217
"Double Oh Oops" – Scaredy accidentally finds outs Mildred is a spy and, after her capture, must go on a mission to rescue her. "Stack to School" – It is discovered that Scaredy is one credit shy of his stacking degree and must return to college to pass.
14	40	"Store Trek" "Safety Corner Conundrum"	March 16, 2013	June 20, 2013	214	1.178
"Store Trek" – After Nestor is kicked out of his medieval reenactment group, Scaredy has to get Nestor out of his funk before the big store inspection. "Safety Corner" – When Safety Corner gets put on Balsa TV, Scaredy loses control of his own show.

=== Season 3 (2013) ===
No. overall	No. in season	Title	Canadian original air date	U.S. original air date	Prod. code	U.S. viewers (in millions)
1	41	"Adventures in Frogsitting" "Straighten Up and Flu Right"	June 1, 2013	September 2, 2014	301	N/A
"Adventures in Frogsitting" – Scaredy loses Mildred's nephew. "Straighten Up and Flu Right" – When Dave gets sick, Scaredy tries to beat his "healing record."
2	42	"Abracagrandma" "Momma Lisa Smile"	June 8, 2013	September 3, 2014	302	N/A
"Abracagrandma" – Scaredy performs a magic act that makes Grandmomma vanish. "Momma Lisa Smile" – Momma attempts to graduate from Smile School.
3	43	"Arachnofriendly" "28 Daves Later"	June 15, 2013	September 4, 2014	303	N/A
"Arachnofriendly" – Scaredy meets a spider; Scaredy plans to prove he is a useful employee. "28 Daves Later" – Dave photocopies himself 27 times.
4	44	"Day of the Stackal" "The Dave 'n' Dave"	June 22, 2013	September 5, 2014	304	N/A
"Day of the Stackal" – After a wild night stacking spree, Scaredy must prove he is innocent. "The Dave 'n' Dave" – Scaredy tries to get the store running smoothly after Momma loses the store to Dave.
5	45	"Buck Up Buck" "Ice Cream Headache"	June 29, 2013	September 6, 2014	305	N/A
"Buck Up Buck" – Buck chips a tooth. "Ice Cream Headache" – Scaredy and Dave run the only ice cream truck in town.
6	46	"Three Alarm Flyer" "Driving Miss Davey"	July 6, 2013	September 9, 2014	306	N/A
"Three Alarm Flyer" – Scaredy gets carried away writing the Stash N' Hoard's weekly flyer. "Driving Miss Davey" – Scaredy becomes a driving instructor.
7	47	"Great Dane" "Fudge Filled Fib"	July 13, 2013	September 10, 2014	307	N/A
"Great Dane" Scaredy is determined to make Dave and Dane friends again. "Fudge Filled Fib" Scaredy lies in order to get his own Squirrel Guides troop.
8	48	"Rockin' Richard" "Misfortune Teller"	July 20, 2013	September 11, 2014	308	N/A
"Rockin' Richard" – Scaredy buys a voice box for Richard. "Misfortune Teller" – A coin-operated fortune teller tells Scaredy something he doesn't want to hear.
9	49	"The Trophy Catastrophe" "Encino Squirrel"	July 27, 2013	September 12, 2014	309	N/A
"The Trophy Catastrophe" – Scaredy tries to help Dave win a trophy. "Encino Squirrel" – Scaredy thaws out a frozen squirrel and helps him adjust.
10	50	"My Udder Best Friend" "Lost in Donations"	August 3, 2013	September 13, 2014	310	N/A
"My Udder Best Friend" – Scaredy encourages Dave and Millie to be friends. "Lost in Donations" – Scaredy takes advantage of several donation on Give'er Day.
11	51	"Double Decker Danger" "Actually It Is Rocket Science"	August 10, 2013	September 16, 2014	311	N/A
"Double Decker Danger" – Two thieves take advantage of Scaredy being a guide. "Actually It Is Rocket Science" – Momma orders new shopping carts.
12	52	"For a Few S'Mores More" "Sinker, Sailor, Squirrel, Spy"	August 17, 2013	September 17, 2014	312	N/A
"For a Few S'Mores More" – Scaredy must save his home from a corrupt Marshmallow Tycoon. "Sinker, Sailor, Squirrel, Spy" – Scaredy, Dave and Mildred try to save Balsa from the evil Otters. Note: This episode is dedicated to Robert Henry, who served as the picture editor of the series.
