= Claude Poissant =

Canadian actor, screenwriter and theatre director (1955–2025)

- Born: 24 October 1955; Montreal, Quebec, Canada
- Died: 6 June 2025 (aged 69)
- Occupation(s): Actor, screenwriter, theatre director

Claude Poissant (24 October 1955 – 6 June 2025) was a Canadian actor, screenwriter and theatre director.

Poissant notably served as director of the Théâtre Denise-Pelletier, where he directed L'Orangeraie, written by Larry Tremblay.

Poissant died on 6 June 2025, at the age of 69.

== Filmography ==
=== Actor ===
- The Party (1990)
- Les Sauf-conduits (1991)
- Elvis Gratton II : Miracle à Memphis (1999)
- Rumeurs (2002)

=== Screenwriter ===
- Nelligan (1991)
