= Nobody's Son (novel) =

1993 fantasy novel by Sean Stewart

- First edition
- Author: Sean Stewart
- Cover artist: Stephen Hutchings
- Publication date: January 28, 1993
- Awards: Canadian Library Association Young Adult Book Award (1994); Prix Aurora Award (1994)

Nobody's Son is a 1993 fantasy novel by Sean Stewart. It was first published by Macmillan of Canada.

== Synopsis ==
When peasant Shielder's Mark breaks the curse of the Red Keep and frees the kingdom of Swangard from the Ghostwood, he claims as his reward the princess royal's hand in marriage. The ramifications of this choice are far more complex than he expected, however, especially since the aristocracy does not particularly like him.

== Reception ==
Canadian Literature praised Stewart for transcending the usual stereotypes of fairy tales, calling Nobody's Son an "existential drama" with "breathing, clearly individualized characters", and comparing Shielder's Mark to the creations of J. D. Salinger.

John Clute noted that "[the novel's] title contradicts the very heart of all modern commercial fantasy, and almost any other kind of fantasy as well", and described it as "the most intensely likeable story" that he had read in years. Jo Walton called it "immensely readable and [with] genuine emotional depth", but noted that — as was typical of her experience with Stewart's works — she was unable to retain much memory of what had happened in the novel.

Nobody's Son won the 1994 Canadian Library Association Young Adult Book Award and Prix Aurora Award for Best Long-Form Work.
