= Wondrous Strange =

2009 fantasy novel by Lesley Livingston

- Author: Lesley Livingston
- Language: English
- Genre: Theatre-fiction
- Publisher: Harper Collins Canada
- Publication date: 2008
- Publication place: Canada
- Media type: Book
- OCLC: 276814495
- Followed by: Darklight

Wondrous Strange a teen fantasy novel and the first book by author Lesley Livingston. It was published in trade paperback on January 13, 2009, by HarperCollins Canada, Ltd.

== Plot ==
Kelley Winslow is a teenage actress who lives in New York! When the lead actress in their production of Shakespeare's A Midsummer Night's Dream gets injured, Kelley goes from understudy to star in an instant. In her first rehearsal, she forgets a few lines, ending in her going to Central Park to practice. Meanwhile, Sonny Flannery, a Janus guard protecting the mortal realm, is hunting the Fae that passed through The Gate, the only way through the Otherworld and ours. He sees her as a Firework and is merely curious in what she really is. He starts to follow her and in the end she becomes furious that he won't stop bugging her and she yells at him. During her ranting, however, Sonny is hurtled across the rad by her fist and sees her with light encircling her. He notices it is great power. When she is done she walks off, and another of the Janus guard appears. Sonny asks him if he saw the bright light and he replies uncomfortably "Might have...". Just when she thinks things couldn't get any worse, they do. Having lived all her life hidden in the mortal realm, she is unaware of being a Faerie princess, stolen from the Faerie realm as an infant. When Sonny discovers her true identity, an interlinking chain of events threaten to destroy both the realms, mortal as well as Faerie.

Kelly was an understudy, but one moment she had the chance to perform on stage because mindi had broken her ankle so she had to start rehearsing on stage with the rest of the actresses in the play. As kelly is in the dressing room she releases that she forgot her first line, but she tells herself that she has been waiting for this her whole life and that all those month of —----- with her household pets she can do this she tells herself to go out there and show the people what she can do.as she walks to the back of the stage Puck lounges a handful of glitter into the air ‘thanks a lot Puck’ kelly muttered .Her hire, face and shoulder were covered in glitter. She nervously picked up her skirt and ran toward the stage. As she got to the stage she saw that the fairy dust was shiny to the point of blinding.
