= Mélanie Watt =

French-Canadian illustrator and writer of children's picture books

- Born: August 20, 1975 (age 51); Montreal, Quebec, Canada
- Education: Université du Québec à Montréal
- Occupations: Children's book author and illustrator
- Notable work: Scaredy Squirrel

Mélanie Watt (born August 20, 1975 in Montreal, Quebec) is a Canadian children's author and illustrator. She is best known for Scaredy Squirrel, which won the Ruth & Sylvia Schwartz Children's Book Award and was published in French as Frisson l'écureuil. Melanie Watt's other major picture book series is Chester, which is about a cat named Chester who competes with Watt for the chance to write and illustrate his books. Chester (2009), the first book in the series, received a starred review from Publishers Weekly.

As of 2012, she has sold over two million books that have been translated into 23 languages.

== Biography ==
As a child, Mélanie Watt enjoyed drawing the comic strip character Garfield. The Scaredy Squirrel series is influenced by Watt's childhood experiences, including her childhood fear of sharks. She received a BA in graphic design from the Université du Québec à Montréal. In 1999, while enrolled in an illustration class taught by Michele Lemieux, Watt wrote her first story, Leon the Chameleon.

One of her inspirations is children's book author Mo Willems.

She currently resides near Montreal.

== Awards and honours ==
Five of Watt's books are Junior Library Guild selections: Leon the Chameleon (2001), Scaredy Squirrel (2006), Scaredy Squirrel Makes a Friend (2007), Scaredy Squirrel at the Beach (2008), and Scaredy Squirrel at Night (2009).

Awards for Watt's books
Year	Title	Award	Result	Ref.
2006	Scaredy Squirrel	Cybils Award for Fiction Picture Books	Winner	
2007	Scaredy Squirrel	ALSC Notable Children's Books	Selection	
2007	Scaredy Squirrel	Ruth and Sylvia Schwartz Award	Winner	
2008	Chester's Back	Cybils Award for Fiction Picture Books	Finalist	
2011	Scaredy Squirrel Has a Birthday Party	Goodreads Choice Award for Picture Books	Nominee	
2015	Bug in a Vacuum	Cybils Award for Fiction Picture Books	Finalist	

== Works ==
=== Scaredy Squirrel ===
- Scaredy Squirrel (2006)
- Scaredy Squirrel Makes a Friend (2007)
- Scaredy Squirrel at the Beach (2008)
- Scaredy Squirrel at Night (2009)
- Scaredy Squirrel Has a Birthday Party (2011)
- Scaredy Squirrel Prepares for Christmas (2012)
- Scaredy Squirrel Goes Camping (2013)
- Scaredy Squirrel Prepares for Halloween (2013)
- Scaredy Squirrel in a Nutshell (2021)
- Scaredy Squirrel Gets a Surprise (2022)
- Scaredy Squirrel Visits the Doctor (2022)
- Scaredy Squirrel Gets Festive (2023)

=== Chester ===
- Chester (2007)
- Chester's Back! (2008)
- Chester's Masterpiece (2010)

=== Other works ===
- Leon the Chameleon (2001)
- Colors (2005)
- Augustine (2009)
- You're Finally Here! (2011)
- Have I Got a Book for You (2013)
- Bug in a Vacuum (2015)
