= The King's Daughter =

1974 French Canadian novel

- First edition
- Author: Suzanne Martel
- Original title: Jeanne, fille du Roy
- Translator: David Toby Hamel and Margaret Rose
- Illustrator: Michelle Poirier
- Language: French; English
- Genre: Young adult historical fiction
- Publisher: Montreal: Éditions Fides; Vancouver: Douglas & McIntyre
- Publication date: 1974
- Publication place: Canada
- Pages: 254; 211
- OCLC: 15780114
- LC Class: PQ3919.2.M3 J4

The King's Daughter (French: Jeanne, fille du Roy) is a historical novel for young adult readers by Suzanne Martel, first published in 1974. It follows the life of Jeanne Chatel, one of the King's Daughters of New France in the seventeenth century.

== Plot ==
Jeanne Chatel is an orphan from a once prosperous family who lived with her grandfather until he died of illness when Jeanne was 10. Unable to survive alone, Jeanne is forced to enter a convent. She is an adventurous, boisterous girl, creating and telling the other girls grand, romantic stories about herself and her friend, Thierry. She also shows an aptitude for healing and herbal medicine. At the age of 18, Jeanne is offered the chance to become a King's Daughter and travel to New France. Jeanne immediately agrees to this and sets out to New France with her friend Marie. Together they embark on their 41-day trip across the Atlantic Ocean. Along the way, Jeanne demonstrates her inherent ability for healing and medicines alongside her guardian Sister Bourgeoys, while Marie falls in love with a sailor named Jean.

The two girls arrive in New France in August, 1672 and are welcomed by the Lieutenant, several potential fiancées and a group of Hurons. Marie, having fallen in love along the way, becomes saddened at the thought of marrying someone else. Jeanne realizes that in order for Marie to be happy, someone else must marry the man that was chosen for her. Jeanne then makes the decision to get married in Marie's place. Announcing herself as Marie to the party sent to accompany the bride to her fiancée, she slips quietly out of the village before anyone can notice the switch. When Jeanne meets her new husband, she is sorely disappointed. Simon de Rouville is, upon first impression rude, callous, and unfriendly. However, the ever-determined Jeanne decides to stay and make the best of her situation.

As her new life in the wilderness begins, Jeanne faces many hardships. The constant reminder from friends and even her own husband of her uncanny resemblance to Aimee, Simon's late wife, drives Jeanne into a sort of depression, causing her to shut herself off from her husband and nearly costing her life on one occasion. In spite of this, Jeanne stays to make a better life for her husband and his two children, Nicholas and Isabelle.

During her husband's many absences, Jeanne is often sought out by her "neighbours" for her skill as a healer and on more than one occasion must bravely rescue her children from one peril or another.

Eventually, Jeanne and Simon fall in love with each other, and Jeanne grows strong as a result of her new life. She also cultivates her talents as a healer and becomes well known in the area. Her love for her husband and pride as his wife wills her to even masquerade as a boy and travel far from home to save Simon's trapper's license.

The book ends with an attack from the Iroquois aboriginals, a constant threat in New France. The Rouville family survives, after many other conflicts.

== Publication ==
The King's Daughter was originally published in French in 1974 by Montreal publishing company Fides under the name Jeanne, Fille du Roy. In 1980, it was translated into English by Margaret Rose and David Toby Homel then re-published under the name The King's Daughter by Groundwood Books. During the early 1990s the book was challenged for its content and subsequently in 1994 it was re-printed with the offensive passages edited out and included a warning about the content of the book.

== Awards ==
Jeanne, Fille du Roy originally started out as an entry to a historical fiction short story contest being sponsored by Châtelaine. After winning the contest, Martel "found that the main character, Jeanne, remained vividly in her imagination, and decided to write more about her" and have her story published. To ensure as accurate a portrayal of the situation as possible, Martel opted to read several accounts about the King's Daughters in the 17th century. Upon publication, Jeanne, Fille du Roy was awarded the Alvine-Bélisle ASTED Prize in 1974. After being translated into English in 1980, The King's Daughter was awarded the Ruth Schwartz Children's Book Award in 1981.

== Challenges ==
In 1993, the book was pulled from the shelves of a Regina public school after questions were raised about the language used to describe the First Nations populations in the book and the main character's subsequent reactions to them. These passages and the language used in them were deemed as racist and unfit for children to read. This event caused the publishers to re-evaluate the way these people were described and ultimately led to the censoring or editing of various passages throughout the book without notifying the author, as well as the inclusion of a "publisher's note" at the end of the book. In the note, the publisher reminds readers that the views expressed by Jeanne are not a true reflection of the First Nation people who were present during that time period, but simply the assumed reactions of a young, frightened woman being exposed to a new world.
