= Ontario Arts Foundation =

- Formation: 1991; 35 years ago
- Website: oafdn.ca

The Ontario Arts Foundation is a non-governmental not for profit organization established in 1991 under the Ontario Corporations Act to encourage and facilitate private giving to the arts in Ontario, Canada. The group is distinct from the Ontario Arts Council, which administers public funding for Ontario Artists and arts organizations.

== Operation ==
The Foundation assists the Ontario Arts Council by assisting with private funding of the arts and oversees 360 endowments established by individuals, foundations, corporations and arts organizations.

In 2023, it had $100 million in assets and disbursements of over $5.8 million using a staff of two and a board of 15.

== Programs ==
The Foundation manages three programs, the Arts Endowment Fund Program, the Canada Cultural Investment Fund, Endowment Incentives Component, and the Private Funds, Awards, Scholarships.

List of private funds, awards and scholarships administered by the Ontario Arts Foundation:

- Louis Applebaum Composers Award
- Laura Ciruls Painting Fund
- Virginia and Myrtle Cooper Award in Costume Design
- William and Mary Corcoran Craft Awards
- K.M. Hunter Artist Awards
- Douglas James Dales Fund
- Christopher Dedrick Fund
- Paul de Hueck and Norman Walford Career Achievement Awards
- Hal Jackman Fund
- Mary Jolliffe Award for Senior Arts Administrators
- Hugh D. McKellar Fund
- Kathleen McMorrow Music Award
- Ontario Arts Foundation Artist Educator Award
- Orford String Quartet Fund
- Philip Akin – Black Shoulders Legacy Award
- Christina and Louis Quilico Awards
- Ruth & Sylvia Schwartz Children's Book Awards
- Ellen Ross Stuart Opening Doors Awards
- Tafelmusik, Horst Dantz and Don Quick Endowed Fund
- Tim Sims Encouragement Fund Award
- Le Fonds Héritage Richard – Vaillancourt Legacy Fund
- Gina Wilkinson Prize for an Emerging Female Director
- Wuchien Michael Than Fund

== See also ==
- Ontario Art Council
