= List of young adult fiction awards =

Young adult fiction awards recognize outstanding works of young adult fiction.

== Young adult awards ==
Award Title	Organization	Founded	Description	References
Alex Awards	YALSA	1998	Awarded annually to ten books written for adults that have special appeal to young adults.	
Andre Norton Award	Science Fiction and Fantasy Writers of America (SFWA)	2006	Awarded annually for the best young adult science fiction or fantasy book published in the United States.	
Asian/Pacific American Awards for Literature	APALA	2010	Honors individual work about Asian/Pacific Americans and their heritage, based on literary and artistic merit. Awards are given in five categories including Young Adult Literature.	
Cybils Award (Children's and Young Adult Bloggers' Literary Awards)	Bloggers with expertise in children's literature	2006	Given on the basis of literary merit and kid appeal in many categories, including Young Adult Novel.	
Edgar Award	Mystery Writers of America	1989	Given for mystery writing in about a dozen categories, including Best Young Adult Novel.	
GLLI Translated YA Book Prize	Global Literature in Libraries Iniatitive (GLLI)	2019	Awarded annually for the best Young Adult book translated into English. One prize and several Honor titles.	
Golden Kite Award	Society of Children's Book Writers and Illustrators (SCBWI)	2016	Given in six categories from picture books through young adult.	
Lodestar Award	World Science Fiction Society	2018	Awarded annually to a book published for young adult readers in the field of science fiction or fantasy.	
Los Angeles Times Book Prize	The Los Angeles Times	1998	Given in about a dozen categories, including Young Adult Fiction.	
Margaret A. Edwards Award	YALSA/School Library Journal	1988	Awarded annually to recognize authors for lifetime contributions to popular young adult literature.	
Michael L. Printz Award	YALSA	2000	Awarded annually for excellence in young adult literature. The ALA has also put out an annual list of Best Books for Young Adults since 1930, and a Top Ten list since 1997.	
William C. Morris Award	YALSA	2009	Given annually to a previously unpublished author "who has made a strong literary debut in writing for young adult readers".	

The Canadian Library Association gave a young adult book award for Canadian books from 1981 until the group's disbandment in 2016.

== Children's/young adult awards ==
These awards are granted to either a children's or a young adult book.

Award Title	Organization	Founded	Description	References
Coretta Scott King Award	Ethnic & Multicultural Information Exchange Round Table/ALA	1970	Awarded annually to outstanding African American authors and illustrators of books for children and young adults.	
Boston Globe-Horn Book Award	The Boston Globe/The Horn Book Magazine	1967	Given annually in the categories Picture Book, Fiction and Poetry, and Nonfiction. The latter two awards may be either children’s or young adult works.	
National Book Award	National Book Foundation	1996	National Book Awards are given in five categories, one of them Young People's Literature.	
Odyssey Award	YALSA/ALSC	2008	Honors the producer of the best audiobook produced for children and/or young adults, available in English in the United States.	
Pura Belpré Award	YALSA/ALSC	1996	Awarded to a Latino or Latina author and illustrator whose work best portrays the Latino cultural experience in a work of literature for children or youth.	
Stonewall Book Award	Gay, Lesbian, Bisexual, and Transgender Round Table/ALA	2010	Awards books that have exceptional merit relating to the LGBTQ experience. One of the three awards granted is for children's and YA literature.	

== See also ==
- Category:Young adult literature awards
