= Suzanne Martel =

French Canadian journalist, novelist and children's writer (1924–2012)

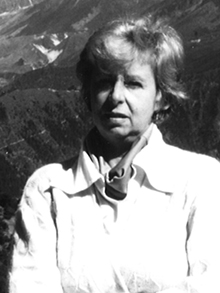
- Martel in the late 1970s
- Born: Suzanne Chouinard; October 8, 1924; Quebec City, Quebec, Canada
- Died: July 29, 2012 (aged 87); Ste-Adèle, Quebec
- Occupations: Novelist, short story writer, columnist
- Spouse: Maurice Martel
- Children: 6
- Relatives: Monique Corriveau, sister
- Writing career
- Genres: Canadian literature Children's literature, adventure fiction, science fiction
- Website: suzannemartel.com

Suzanne Chouinard Martel (October 8, 1924 – July 29, 2012) was a French Canadian journalist, novelist and children's writer.

== Life ==
Suzanne Chouinard was the daughter of Francis Xavier Chouinard, clerk of Quebec City between 1927 and 1961 and Lady Couillard, who resided at rue de Bernières in Quebec City until 1963. Her younger sister Monique became well known in Quebec as Monique Corriveau, the author of more than twenty novels for teenagers.

Amazed by the universe of the novels of Rudyard Kipling (The Jungle Book), the Chouinard sisters invented an imaginary country, the Gotal, home to those they call "People in the wall". As children and teenagers, they wrote the adventures of these forty fictional characters they get to know as well as their own family. They were so attached to their writing that, when they reached twelve years old, their mother reportedly forbade them to write more than eight hours a day. Later, when they reached adulthood, they selected, in turn, a Montcorbier clan member and wrote of his adventures. This would become the most voluminous saga of the literary history of Quebec. Prior to the death of Monique Corriveau in 1976, the two sisters had written one for the other fifteen novels on their respective heroes. This saga remains largely unpublished to date.

Suzanne Martel studied at École des Ursulines, Quebec, then continued her studies in literature and languages at the University of Toronto.

She worked as a journalist for Le Soleil in 1945, then as a freelancer in 1946.

After World War II, Martel came to live in Outremont with Maurice Martel, her husband, who was a lawyer. In subsequent years, the writer gave birth to six boys (Paul, Bernard, Luc, Éric, Alain-Anadi and Yves) who quickly became her primary audience.

Martel's first book was published in 1963, Quatre Montréalais en l'an 3000, a young-adult science fiction novel (published in English as The City Under Ground, 1964). She received the prize of the Canadian Association of French-language publishers. This classic children's book – which is said to be the first science fiction novel in Quebec – is still being studied in some schools. (It is known best as Surréal 3000, the title introduced for a revised edition in 1966, published in English as The City Underground, 1982.)

In 1971, she founded the weekly children's publication Safari in the newspaper Montréal-Matin. She was an editor until 1974 when the newspaper was sold to La Presse.

Subsequently, Martel published many novels that made her one of the greatest novelists of adventure both in Quebec and Canada.

On July 29, 2012, Martel died surrounded by her family in Ste-Adèle.

== Awards ==
Martel's book Jeanne, Fille du Roy (translated as The King's Daughter), is frequently read in highschool in Quebec and Ontario. She has won numerous awards, including:

- Governor-General's Literary Awards (1994, Une belle journée pour mourir)
- The Canada Council Children's Literature Prize (1982, Nos amis robots)
- Ruth Schwartz Children's Book Award (1981, The King's Daughter)
- Air Canada Prize (1979 for a news story)
- Canadian Authors' Association Awards Program Vicky Metcalf Body of Work Award (1974)
- Alvine-Bélisle ASTED Prize (1974, Jeanne, Fille du Roi)
- Province of Quebec Prize (1968, Lis-moi la baleine)
- First Château Prize (1967, Fille du Roi)
- Federal Centennial Prize (1967, Un trop bon diable)
- ACELF Prize (1962, Surréal 3000; 1963, Lis-moi la baleine; 1979, Nos amis robots)

== Works ==
- Quatre Montréalais en l'an 3000 (Montreal: Éditions du jour, 1963);

English, The City Under Ground, illustrated by Don Sibley (Viking Press, 1964, LCCN 64-22968), translated by Norah Smaridge

Revised and issued as Surréal 3000 (Macmillan Canada, 1966) – "Edited with exercises and vocabulary by H. C. Steels; ill. by Lee Clifton. [...] French, with English preface and notes." LCCN 66-67125

English, The City Underground (1982), transl. David Homel

- Lis-moi la baleine, illustrated by her son Éric Martel (Éditions Jeunesse, 1966, OCLC 858404963)
- Marmitons, Suzanne and her son Alain Martel, ill. Cécile Gagnon (Éditions Jeunesse, 1972, OCLC 25431957), cookbook
- Jeanne, Fille du Roy, ill. Michelle Poirier (Montreal: Éditions Fides, 1974, LCCN 75-503892);

English translation, The King's Daughter (Douglas & McIntyre, 1980, OCLC 8661387)

- Titralak, Cadet de l'espace (Montreal: Éditions Héritage, 1974, LCCN 75-518686)
- Pi-Oui (Héritage, 1974, OCLC 3612356), 2nd ed. revised (Héritage, 1979, OCLC 15911951), 3rd ed. "simplifiée par Danièle Geoffrion et Éric Martel" (Héritage, 1979, OCLC 301458115);

English, Peewee (Scholastic, 1982, OCLC 15918973)

- Tout sur Noël (1977), activity book
- Goûte à tout, ill. Cécile Gagnon (1977), cookbook
- Les coureurs des bois (1980 or earlier(?), OCLC 865186117; 1993 omnibus(?), OCLC 27851685)
1. Menfou Carcajou (Leméac, 1980)
2. La baie du Nord (1980)
3. Une belle journée pour mourir (1980 or 1993?)
4. Les chemins d'eau (1993?, OCLC 56249646)
- Nos Amis Robots (Héritage, 1981, LCCN 81-205682); 2nd ed. "simplifiée par Danièle Geoffrion et Éric Martel", 1982, OCLC 15952643

English, Robot Alert (Kids Can Press, 1985, OCLC 869380895)

- Marguerite Bourgeois, or Au temps de Marguerite Bourgeoys, quand Montréal était un village (1982)
- L'enfant de lumière (1983)
- Contes de Noël : contes d'autrefois pour les gens d'aujourd'hui (1984)
- Un orchestre dans l'espace (1985)

Martel is also the author of the Montcorbier series, developed during childhood with her younger sister Monique Corriveau (another children's writer, as an adult).

- A la découverte du Gotal (prelude) (Fides, 1979, LCCN 79-127374)
- L'apprentisage d'Arahéé – 1910 (Fides, 1979, LCCN 80-107985)
- Première armes – 1918 (Fides, 1979, LCCN 80-107988)
- Arnaud de Moncorbier – 1914 (Boréal, 1997); perhaps a reprint or omnibus OCLC 36840592
- La musique de la lune – 1919 (Boréal, 1998, LCCN 98-225002)
- Les aigles d'argent – 1919 (Boréal, 1999, LCCN 00-304558)

Her books have been translated into several languages including Spanish and Japanese.

Another dozen or so were self-published for the family only.

Her memoirs, in five tomes, were also printed for the family and close friends.
