= Julie Johnston (writer) =

Canadian writer

Julie Johnston is a Canadian writer. She was raised in Smiths Falls, Ontario, in the Ottawa Valley. She studied at the University of Toronto. She now lives in Peterborough, Ontario.

Her first two novels for young adults won the Governor General's Award for English-language children's literature.

== Works ==
- Hero of Lesser Causes (1992)
- Adam and Eve and Pinch-Me (1994)
- The Only Outcast (1998)
- Love Ya Like a Sister: A Story of Friendship from the Journals of Katie Ouriou (1999)
- In Spite of Killer Bees (2001)
- Susannah's Quill (2004)
- As if by Accident (2005)
- Little Red Lies (2013)
- Two Moons in August

== Awards ==
- Governor General's Award for English-language children's literature (1992, 1994)
- National Chapter of Canada IODE Violet Downey Book Award (1993)
- Ruth Schwartz Children's Book Award (Young Adult/Middle Reader Category) (1995)
- Young Adult Canadian Book Award Young-adult-fiction awards (1995)
