= The Snow Queen (Kernaghan novel) =

2000 novel by Eileen Kernaghan

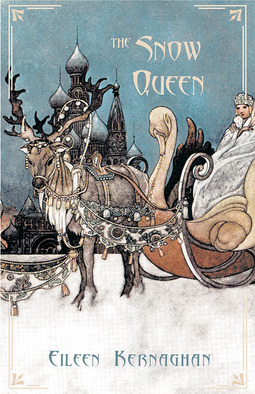
- Author: Eileen Kernaghan
- Language: English
- Publisher: Thistledown Press
- Publication date: May 2000
- Media type: E-book; paperback
- Pages: 158
- ISBN: 978-1-894345-14-9
- OCLC: 1162809041

The Snow Queen is a 2000 young-adult fantasy novel by the Canadian writer Eileen Kernaghan. It follows Gerda, a young Danish woman who sets out to rescue her childhood friend Kai from Madame Aurore, a magician known as the Snow Queen. She is joined on her journey by Ritva, a young Sámi woman born to a shamaness and a robber. The novel is based on Hans Christian Andersen's fairy tale "The Snow Queen" (1844), but incorporates elements of Scandinavian shamanism and influences from the Kalevala (1835), a compilation of Finnish mythology and epic poetry. It also explores feminist themes, reinterpreting several plot elements from Andersen's original with contemporary shifts. The Snow Queen was published by Thistledown Press and received positive reviews. It received the Aurora Award for Best Novel in 2001 and was considered for two other accolades.

== Plot summary ==
In nineteenth-century Denmark, Gerda quarrels with her childhood friend Kai after he criticizes her poetry. Having become more interested in scientific pursuits, Kai becomes acquainted with Madame Aurore – a visiting academic – and decides to take an apprenticeship at her estate in Sweden. After he fails to write back for several months, Gerda sets out to find him. Pretending to leave on a vacation, she travels to Aurore's estate, but discovers the two have gone north for the summer. Meanwhile, Ritva, a young Sámi woman born to a shamaness and a robber, begins to have spiritual visions and nightmares. Having inherited powers of prophecy from her mother, Ritva is beginning to grow into a shamaness as well. However, she despises her parents and how her mother behaves when possessed by spirits. She dreads eventually having to take her mother's place in their clan.

Gerda continues journeying north, meeting two women who arrange a carriage for her, but is kidnapped by Ritva and her clan. Gerda is imprisoned in an abandoned castle through the winter and the following summer, growing increasingly depressed. After conversing with spirits, Ritva eventually decides to escape her clan and join Gerda in finding Kai. They set out in the fall with Ritva's reindeer, meeting a woman along the way who writes a message on a fish and directs them to an old wisewoman. They learn that Aurore is the Snow Queen – a magician with dominion over the northern lands – and plan to journey to her palace. The two join the crew of a northbound ship, but it is struck by pack ice at sea and capsized. The crew reaches a small island with supplies to wait out the winter, but the women continue walking over the frozen sea, coming to Aurore's palace at the North Pole.

Aurore has enchanted Kai to futilely labour in the pursuit of all knowledge, driving him nearly to madness. She offers to release him if Gerda and Ritva perform three impossible tasks, which they complete through trickery and magic. Aurore then refuses to return Kai unless Ritva sacrifices her reindeer in exchange. Determined not to abide by her terms, Ritva enchants the palace's inhabitants to sleep. Pursued by Aurore, the two escape with Kai to the southward seas, and are rescued by a vessel heading to the mainland. Gerda discovers that Kai, who she had intended to marry, is no longer as she remembers, as he remains solely interested in science. Ritva convinces Gerda that returning to domestic life is impossible after their experiences; the two embrace, and Ritva tells her to return soon.

== Development and themes ==
=== Composition and literary influences ===
The novel is based on Hans Christian Andersen's "The Snow Queen" (1844), which Eileen Kernaghan chose for a young-adult rendition as it was her favourite fairy tale. She considered her novel a "retelling" of the tale, a compositional approach she had not taken for any other work. Kernaghan had previously written a poem and a short story based on the tale; the latter was published in 1995. (Note: Kernaghan stated that she expanded her poem, titled "The Robber Maiden's Story", into a short story with the same title years prior to her novel. Kernaghan wrote the story for an adult audience, and it therefore differs from the equivalent chapters in the novel: Gerda and Ritva develop a sexual relationship, and Gerda continues her journey to the Snow Queen's palace alone. The short story was published in a 1995 issue of the Canadian magazine TransVersions, and in a 2015 issue of Pulp Literature.) As the idea continued to hold her interest, she decided to expand them into the novel.

The novel is a fantasy, but the scholars Anna E. Altmann and Gail de Vos wrote that its magic "runs side-by-side with historical realism", and Kernaghan used various non-fiction sources to develop the setting. She felt that there was a contrast between her novel's "older, darker" features and Andersen's fiction, which is based in Christianity. The novel includes elements of northern Scandinavian shamanism, in which she became interested while conducting research for her previous work Dance of the Snow Dragon (1995). She also drew influence from the Kalevala (1835), a compilation of Finnish mythology and epic poetry, which she felt paralleled the narrative of the original tale. The ending in particular derives several events from the myths, and consequently follows a different narrative, which she considered a significant divergence from Andersen. The characters are also markedly older in Kernaghan's version, adolescents rather than children, and the scholar Mary-Ann Stouck wrote that Kernaghan reverses the original's "meaning" by depicting them transitioning into adulthood rather than returning to an innocent, nescient state at the tale's end.

Kernaghan stated that she disliked the more "conventional mid-Victorian ending" of the original, in which Gerda and Kay (Note: Kay is the spelling of the character's name used by Hans Christian Andersen.) end up together. Andersen's story depicts the triumph of faith and love over scientific reason through these characters. By contrast, the novel calls their relationship into question when Kai reveals no emotional warmth towards her and continues to pursue knowledge, which Stouck felt transforms the opposing philosophies into "an explicit gender issue". The literary scholar Naomi Wood wrote that the novel, like other adaptations of the tale, renders Gerda's reunion with Kai "anticlimactic, even pointless"; Kernaghan's version instead focuses on the relationship between Gerda and Ritva, and implies that neither choose to settle into domesticity, maintaining their relationship after the novel's end.

=== Feminism and matriarchy ===
Kernaghan stated in an interview with Strange Horizons that her rendition is a feminist interpretation of the tale, although she acknowledged that Andersen himself overturns the gendered convention of the fairy tale genre by having his heroine save the boy. The Little Robber Maiden, a minor character in Andersen's version, was her favourite in the tale, and she intended to build on it to create "uniquely independent female characters". The character appears in the novel as Ritva, a young woman of a Sámi clan. Being wild and illiterate, the writer Clélie Rich said that Ritva begins as Gerda's "antithesis", but the two grow into allies and companions as they slowly recognize each other's strengths. In contrast with the original character, Ritva takes an active role in the plot, accompanying Gerda on her journey, a choice shared among several other adaptations of Andersen's tale. The literary scholar Peter Bramwell found that the Lapland woman and Finnmark woman – who, in the original story, respectively write a message on a fish and bind the winds – are essentially integrated into Ritva's character. Rich found that Ritva, being aware of "worlds beyond the physical", acts as a mentor to Gerda. However, Kernaghan also wanted to portray Gerda as "in many ways [...] the stronger of the two" through her unwavering resolve for her quest.

The communications scholar Sanna Lehtonen viewed the matrilineal structure of the novel's shamanistic tradition as part of a broader trend in contemporary fiction, rooted in radical feminism, to replace the negative stereotypes associated with witchcraft, supplanting "wicked crones and evil enchantresses" with wise or sympathetic figures. She also wrote that the women's "way of life offers an alternative" to the depiction of uncleanliness and debauchery that define the men of Ritva's clan. While Ritva is initially repulsed by Sámi shamanism, she finds "self-realization and empowerment" through it, according to Bramwell. However, she rejects her cultural role as a healer for her community, disowning her matriarchal heritage in an assertion of individualism as she views her mother as an irritable "hag", which Lehtonen found to be a discouraging conclusion.

The literary scholar Joanne Findon felt that the novel "blurs the conventional boundaries between masculine and feminine" by portraying women as holders of powerful positions, including those related to roles in the home. Gerda, for example, embroiders a cloth as part of a task to rescue Kai. Her initiative to pursue her love interest and employment of deception to achieve her objectives are both typically reserved for male characters in traditional tales. Ritva also communes with the heroes of the Kalevala and assumes their responsibilities when setting out against the Snow Queen. Findon saw this moment as a crossing of traditional gender boundaries, as the legendary heroes are all male. The three impossible tasks that Aurore sets the two women are rooted in the epic, and Ritva identifies herself with its legendary male shaman Väinö. Although these tasks have the trappings of a fairy tale confrontation, Findon wrote that Kernaghan's version "violates gender expectations" by featuring women in all roles of the conflict.

=== Northern landscapes ===
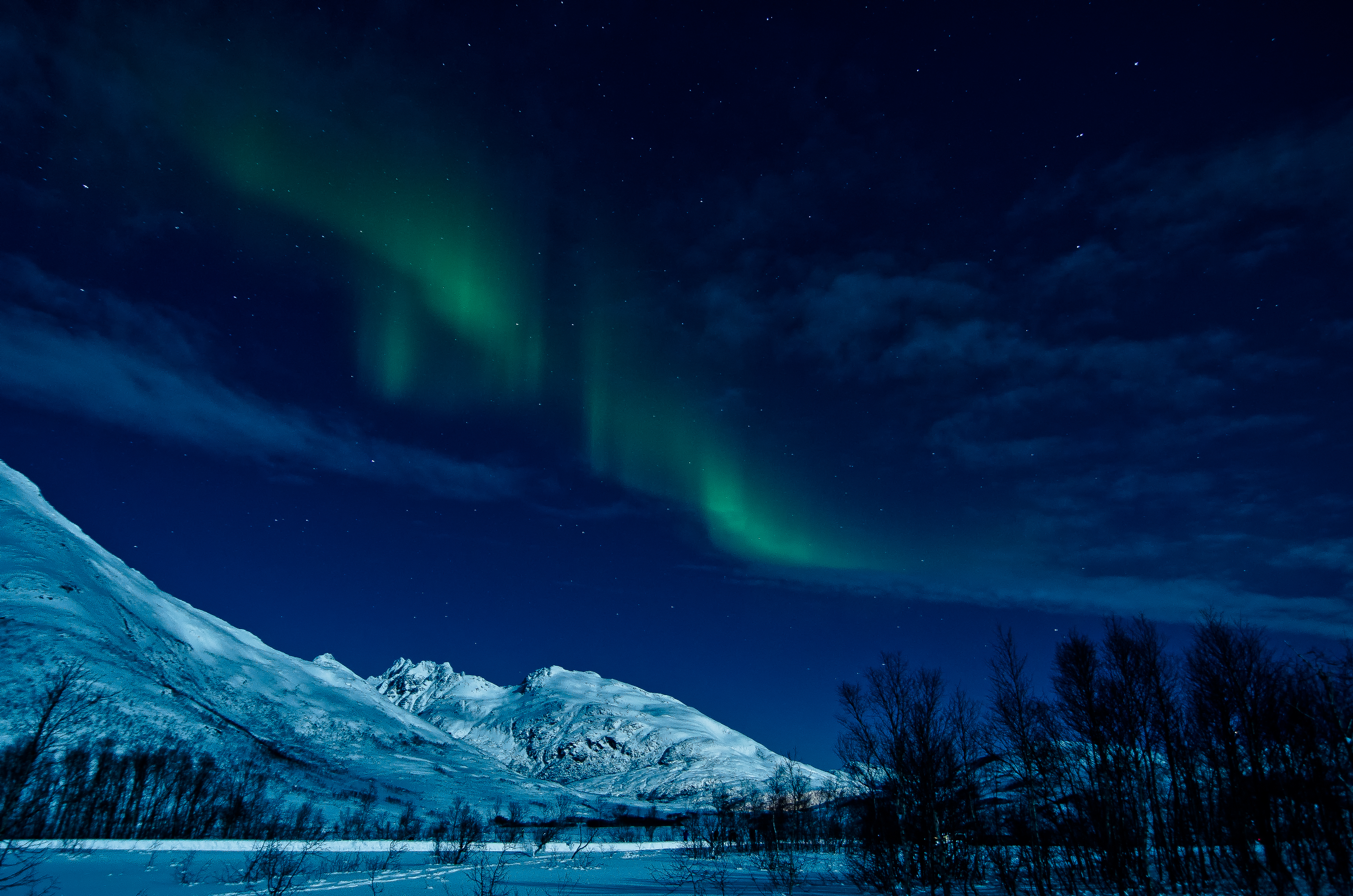
The northern lights over Norway. Several scholars analyzed the novel's fantastical depiction of northern Europe.

Findon analyzed The Snow Queen as a depiction of the "idea of north", in reference to Glenn Gould's radio documentary The Idea of North (1967), which she considered an important aspect of Canadian identity. She also examined its imaginative geography of Arctic landscapes, based on Edward Said's concept of the human perception of environments. According to Lehtonen, Kernaghan's prospective readers would view northern Europe as a "distant fairytale country" holding the potential for supernatural events to transpire. Findon wrote that Madame Aurore – her name itself a reference to the northern lights – is not simply evil, but a representative of nature as "an implacable force that is hostile to humans." Aurore's character also differs from Andersen's Snow Queen, and Findon found a closer similarity with the Kalevala's Hag of the North.

Findon also examined the north as a metaphor for adolescent rebellion and metamorphosis. The landscapes that Gerda encounters grow increasingly supernatural as she approaches the Pole, and Findon wrote that her rising unfamiliarity with her surroundings "[mirrors] her emotional journey" and search for identity as a young adult. She also felt that the huts of the Lapland and Finnmark women highlight Gerda and Ritva's growth in power on their journey. Both huts are integrated into the surrounding landscapes, which Findon found reflective of Ritva's connection to the "primal power of the land", and both old women comment on Gerda's hidden strength and determination.

== Publication and reception ==
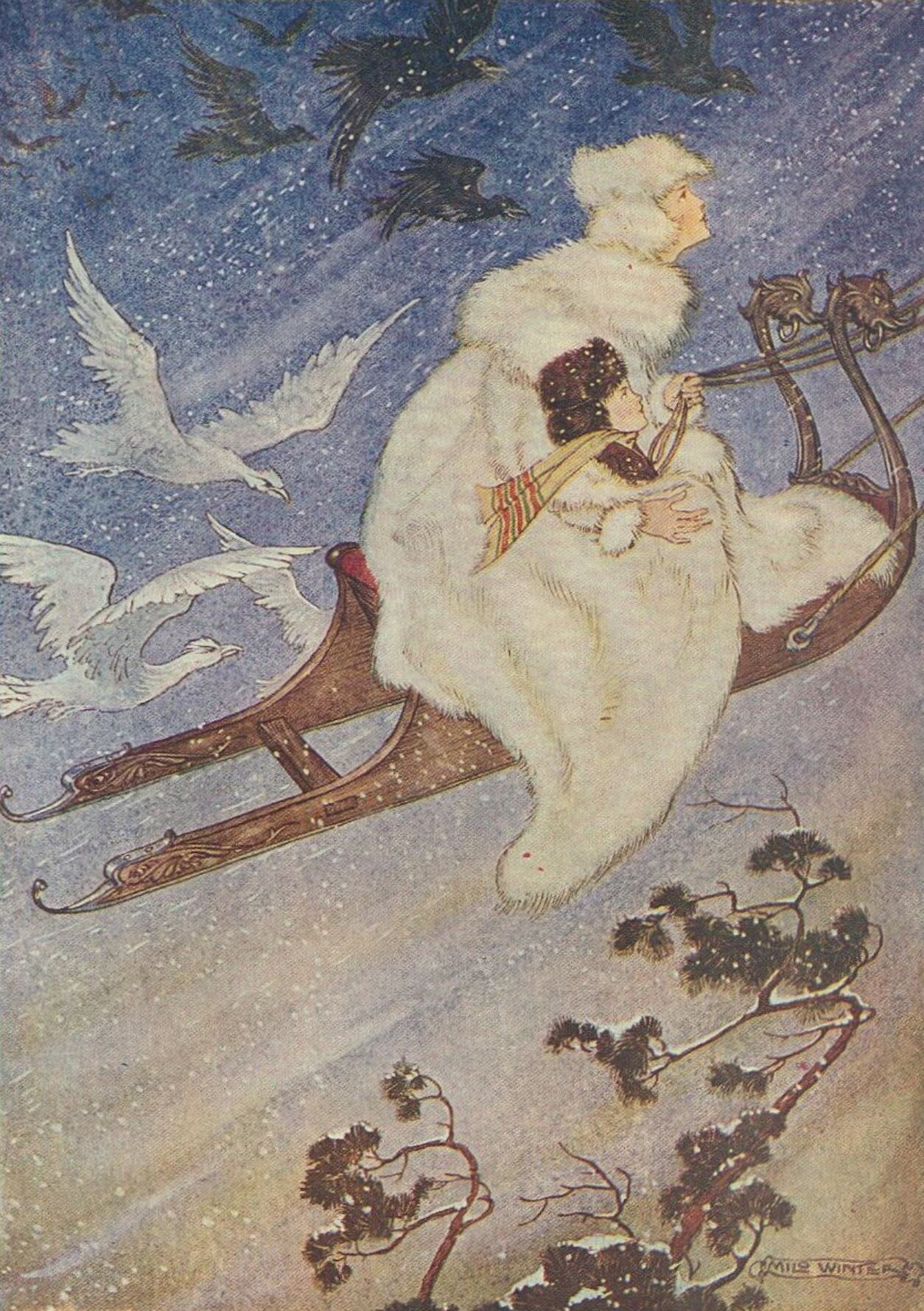
The Snow Queen spirits Kay away in the original tale. Kernaghan's novel, by contrast, depicts Kai allured by Aurore's scientific knowledge, a choice sharply criticized by Russell Blackford.

The 158-page trade paperback was published by Thistledown Press in Saskatoon, Saskatchewan, in May 2000, and received praise from reviewers in fantasy and science fiction magazines. Reviewers commended the depiction of Gerda and Ritva's relationship. The Locus reviewer Carolyn Cushman appreciated the "strong foil" she felt Ritva created for the milder, city-dwelling Gerda, a view echoed by the critic and writer Don D'Ammassa in a review for Science Fiction Chronicle, who said that their dynamic was the highlight of the novel. The writer and critic Russell Blackford, in an article for The New York Review of Science Fiction, wrote that the novel was an "engaging fantasy" that portrays the female protagonists supporting each other and having access to the same opportunities as men, presenting an appealing moral for an audience of teenage girls. However, he disliked the characterization of the antagonist as a woman of scientific accomplishment, which he felt was an attempt to cater to a potential anti-intellectual stance among her younger readers that he found "almost completely gratuitous".

Multiple reviewers praised Kernaghan's prose, including Krista V. Johansen, who found the novel's fantasy to be convincing and immersive. Stouck felt that the descriptive writing towards the end of the novel effectively heightened the suspense. In Realms of Fantasy, Paul Di Filippo found Kernaghan's style to be "quiet, economical, but carefully considered". Denise Dumars, in a review for Cinescape, compared the novel favourably to the original tale, particularly praising the setting and depiction of Sámi culture, which she found intriguing. Cushman also felt that the novel surpasses the merits of Andersen's original in several aspects, including the ending, which she found "bittersweet". Lehtonen, however, wrote that the Finnish elements derived from the Kalevala are not clearly delineated from the details drawn from Sámi traditions, such as the presence of natural spirits and the shaman ritual of singing while beating a drum.

=== Accolades ===
Accolades received by The Snow Queen
Award ceremony / organization	Year	Category	Result	Ref.
Aurora Awards	2001	Best Long-form Work in English	Won	
Canadian Library Association	2002	Book of the Year for Children Award	Shortlisted	
Endeavour Award	2001	Distinguished Novel or Collection	Longlisted	
