= Lyn Cook =

Lyn Cook may refer to:

- Lyn G. Cook, Australian botanist and entomologist
- Lyn Cook (children's author), Canadian children's book writer.

== See also ==
- Lynne Cooke, Australian-born art scholar
