= Sheila A. Egoff Children's Literature Prize =

Canadian literary award

The Sheila A. Egoff Children's Literature Prize is awarded annually as the BC Book Prize for the best juvenile or young adult novel or work of non-fiction by a resident of British Columbia or the Yukon, Canada. It was first awarded in 1987. It is supported by the B.C Library Association.

== History ==
Originally, the prize was awarded for illustrated and non-illustrated literature, but since 2003 the Christie Harris Illustrated Children's Literature Prize has been awarded for illustrated books and the Sheila A. Egoff Children’s Literature Prize for non-illustrated books.

== Winners and finalists ==
Sheila A. Egoff Children's Literature Prize winners and finalists
Year	Author	Title	Result	Ref.
1987	Sarah Ellis	The Baby Project	Winner	
1987	Paul Yee	The Curses of Third Uncle	Finalist	
1987	James Houston	The Falcon Bow	Finalist	
1988	Nicola Morgan	Pride of Lions	Winner	
1988	Kit Pearson	A Handful of Time	Finalist	
1988	Mary Razzell	Salmonberry Wine	Finalist	
1989	Mary-Ellen Lang Collura	Sunny	Winner	
1989	Florence McNeil	Catriona's Island	Finalist	
1989	Deborah Turney Zagwyn	Mood Pocket, Mud Bucket	Finalist	
1990	Paul Yee	Tales from Gold Mountain	Winner	
1990	Kit Pearson	The Sky is Falling	Finalist	
1990	Sarah Ellis	Next-Door Neighbours	Finalist	
1991	Nancy Hundal	I Heard My Mother Call My Name	Winner	
1991	Sue Ann Alderson	Chapter One	Finalist	
1991	Scott Watson	Jack Shadbolt	Finalist	
1992	Alexandra Morton	Siwiti: A Whale's Story	Winner	
1992	Kit Pearson	Looking at the Moon	Finalist	
1992	Sarah Ellis	Pick Up Sticks	Finalist	
1993	Shirley Sterling	My Name is Seepeetza	Winner	
1993	Ainslie Manson	A Dog Came Too	Finalist	
1993	Sue Ann Alderson	Sure as Strawberries	Finalist	
1994	Julie Lawson	White Jade Tiger	Winner	
1994	Sue Ann Alderson	A Ride for Martha	Finalist	
1994	David Bouchard	If You're Not from the Prairie	Finalist	
1995	Lillian Boraks-Nemetz	The Old Brown Suitcase	Winner	
1995	James Heneghan	Torn Away	Finalist	
1995	Mary Razzell	White Wave	Finalist	
1996	Nan Gregory	How Smudge Came	Winner	
1996	Constance Horne	Emily Carr's Woo	Finalist	
1996	Andrea Spalding	Finders Keepers	Finalist	
1997	Sarah Ellis	Back of Beyond	Winner	
1997	Kit Pearson	Awake and Dreaming	Finalist	
1997	W. D. Valgardson	Sarah and the People of Sand River	Finalist	
1998	James Heneghan	Wish Me Luck	Winner	
1998	John Wilson	Across Frozen Seas	Finalist	
1998	Julie Lawson	Emma and the Silk Train	Finalist	
1999	Sandra Lightburn	Driftwood Cove	Winner	
1999	Paul Yee	The Boy in the Attic	Finalist	
1999	Ann Walsh	The Doctor's Apprentice	Finalist	
2000	Vivien Bowers	WOW Canada! Exploring the Land from Coast to Coast to Coast	Winner	
2000	Julie Ovenell-Carter, illus. by Kitty Macaulay	The Butterflies' Promise	Finalist	
2000	W. D. Valgardson	The Divorced Kids Club and Other Stories	Finalist	
2000	Karen Rivers	Dream Water	Finalist	
2000	Nikki Tate	Tarragon Island	Finalist	
2001	James Heneghan	The Grave	Winner	
2001	Ainslie Manson	Ballerinas Don't Wear Glasses	Finalist	
2001	W. D. Valgardson	Frances	Finalist	
2001	Gayle Friesen	Men of Stone	Finalist	
2001	Nikki Tate	No Cafes in Narnia	Finalist	
2002	Polly Horvath	Everything on a Waffle	Winner	
2002	Norma Charles	The Accomplice	Finalist	
2002	Valerie Wyatt and John Mantha	The Kids Book of Canadian Firsts	Finalist	
2002	Maggie de Vries	Chance and the Butterfly	Finalist	
2002	Sarah Ellis	Dear Canada: A Prairie as Wide as the Sea	Finalist	
2003	James Heneghan	Flood	Winner	
2003	Karen Rivers	The Gold Diggers Club	Finalist	
2003	John Lekich	The Losers' Club	Finalist	
2003	Luanne Armstrong	Jeannie and the Gentle Giants	Finalist	
2003	Gayle Friesen	Losing Forever	Finalist	
2004	Dennis Foon	Skud	Winner	
2004	Polly Horvath	The Canning Season	Finalist	
2004	Sarah Ellis	The Several Lives of Orphan Jack	Finalist	
2004	John Wilson	Dancing Elephants and Floating Continents	Finalist	
2004	Irene N. Watts and Lillian Boraks-Nemetz	Tapestry of Hope: Holocaust Writing for Young People	Finalist	
2005	Susan Juby	Miss Smithers	Winner	
2005	Eileen Kernaghan	The Alchemist's Daughter	Finalist	
2005	Cynthia Nugent	Francesca and the Magic Bike	Finalist	
2005	Sandy Frances Duncan	Gold Rush Orphan	Finalist	
2005	Shelley Hrdlitschka	Kat's Fall	Finalist	
2005	Sylvia Olsen	White Girl	Finalist	
2006	Barbara Nickel	Hannah Waters and the Daughter of Johann Sebastien Bach	Winner	
2006	Iain Lawrence	The Convicts	Finalist	
2006	Pamela Porter	The Crazy Man	Finalist	
2006	Polly Horvath	The Vacation	Finalist	
2006	John Wilson	Four Steps to Death	Finalist	
2007	Sarah Ellis	Odd Man Out	Winner	
2007	Iain Lawrence	Gemini Summer	Finalist	
2007	Craig Spence	Josh & the Magic Vial	Finalist	
2007	James Heneghan	Safe House	Finalist	
2007	Glen Huser	Skinnybones and the Wrinkle Queen	Finalist	
2008	Polly Horvath	The Corps of the Bare-Boned Plane	Winner	
2008	John Wilson	The Alchemist's Dream	Finalist	
2008	David Jones	Baboon: A Novel	Finalist	
2008	Gayle Friesen	For Now	Finalist	
2008	Meg Tilly	Porcupine	Finalist	
2009	Polly Horvath	My One Hundred Adventures	Winner	
2009	Robin Stevenson	A Thousand Shades of Blue	Finalist	
2009	Sarah N. Harvey	The Lit Report	Finalist	
2009	Iain Lawrence	The Seance	Finalist	
2009	Graham McNamee	Bonechiller	Finalist	
2010	Carrie Mac	The Gryphon Project	Winner	
2010	Rachelle Delaney	The Ship of Lost Souls	Finalist	
2010	Sylvia Olsen	Counting on Hope	Finalist	
2010	Robin Stevenson	Inferno	Finalist	
2010	Kristin Butcher	Return to Bone Tree Hill	Finalist	
2011	Maggie de Vries	Hunger Journeys	Winner	
2011	Susin Nielsen	Dear George Clooney, Please Marry My Mom	Finalist	
2011	Christy Jordon-Fenton and Margaret Pokiak-Fenton	Fatty Legs: A True Story	Finalist	
2011	Gina McMurchy-Barber	Free as a Bird	Finalist	
2011	Polly Horvath	Northward to the Moon	Finalist	
2012	Moira Young	Blood Red Road	Winner	
2012	Glen Huser	The Runaway	Finalist	
2012	Pamela Porter	I'll Be Watching	Finalist	
2012	Caitlyn Vernon	Nowhere Else on Earth: Standing Tall for the Great Bear Rainforest	Finalist	
2012	Karen Rivers	What is Real	Finalist	
2013	Caroline Adderson	Middle of Nowhere	Winner	
2013	John Lekich	The Prisoner of Snowflake Falls	Finalist	
2013	Susin Nielsen	The Reluctant Journal of Henry K. Larsen	Finalist	
2013	Victoria Miles	Mimi Power and the I-Don't-Know-What	Finalist	
2013	Rachel Hartman	Seraphina	Finalist	
2014	Ashley Little	The New Normal	Winner	
2014	Ari Goelman	The Path of Names	Finalist	
2014	Becky Citra	If Only	Finalist	
2014	Robin Stevenson	Record Breaker	Finalist	
2014	Silvana Goldemberg, trans. by Emilie Smith	Victoria	Finalist	
2015	Maggie de Vries	Rabbit Ears	Winner	
2015	Elizabeth Stewart	Blue Gold	Finalist	
2015	Gabrielle Prendergast	Capricious	Finalist	
2015	Becky Citra	Finding Grace	Finalist	
2015	Eileen Kernaghan	Sophie, in Shadow	Finalist	
2016	Susan Juby	The Truth Commission	Winner	
2016	Jordan Stratford	The Case of the Missing Moonstone: The Wollstonecraft Detective Agency, Book 1	Finalist	
2016	Darren Groth	Are You Seeing Me?	Finalist	
2016	Linda Bailey	Seven Dead Pirates	Finalist	
2016	Susin Nielsen	We Are All Made of Molecules	Finalist	
2017	Iain Lawrence	The Skeleton Tree	Winner	
2017	Kit Pearson	A Day of Signs and Wonders	Finalist	
2017	R.K. McLay	The Rahtrum Chronicles: The Dream	Finalist	
2017	Kathleen Cherry	Everyday Hero	Finalist	
2017	Robin Stevenson	Pride: Celebrating Diversity & Community	Finalist	
2018	G. S. Prendergast	Zero Repeat Forever	Winner	
2018	Anne Fleming	The Goat	Finalist	
2018	Kallie George	Heartwood Hotel Book : A True Home	Finalist	
2018	Norma Charles	Runner: Harry Jerome, World’s Fastest Man	Finalist	
2018	Julie Burtinshaw	Saying Good-bye to London	Finalist	
2019	Susin Nielsen	No Fixed Address	Winner	
2019	Monique Gray Smith and Richard Van Camp	The Journey Forward	Finalist	
2019	Janice Lynn Mather	Learning to Breathe	Finalist	
2019	Lianne Oelke	Nice Try, Jane Sinner	Finalist	
2019	Polly Horvath	Very Rich	Finalist	
2020	Robin Stevenson	My Body, My Choice	Winner	
2020	Sabina Khan	The Love and Lies Of Rukhsana Ali	Finalist	
2020	Julia Nobel	The Mystery of Black Hollow Lane	Finalist	
2020	Sara Cassidy	Nevers	Finalist	
2020	Eldon Yellowhorn	What the Eagle Sees	Finalist	
2021	Sara Cassidy	Genius Jolene	Winner	
2021	Gail Anderson-Dargatz	The Ride Home	Finalist	
2021	Melanie Stewart	Heads Up	Finalist	
2021	Dan Bar-el	Just Beyond the Very, Very Far North	Finalist	
2021	Tanya Lloyd Kyi	Me and Banksy	Finalist	
2022	Robbie Waisman and Susan McClelland	Boy from Buchenwald: The True Story of a Holocaust Survivor	Winner	
2022	Tanya Christenson	A Soft Place to Fall	Finalist	
2022	Barbara Nickel	Dear Peter, Dear Ulla	Finalist	
2022	Xiran Jay Zhao	Iron Widow	Finalist	
2022	Angela Ahn	Peter Lee’s Notes from the Field	Finalist	
2023	Rachel Hartman	In the Serpent's Wake	Winner	
2023	Haley Healey, illus. by Kimiko Fraser	Her Courage Rises: 50 Trailblazing Women of British Columbia and the Yukon	Finalist	
2023	Susan Juby	Me Three	Finalist	
2023	Emily Seo, Gracey Zhang	The Science of Boys	Finalist	
2023	Kim Spencer	Weird Rules to Follow	Finalist	
2024	Wanda John-Kehewin	Hopeless in Hope	Winner	
2024	Polly Horvath	Pine Island Visitors	Finalist	
2024	Julie Lawson	Out of the Dark	Finalist	
2024	Janis Bridger and Lara Jean Okihiro	Obaasan's Boots	Finalist	
2024	Andrea Warner and Louise Reimer	Rise Up and Sing! Power, Protest, and Activism in Music	Finalist	
2025	Li Charmaine Anne	Crash Landing	Winner	
2025	Leslie Gentile	Elvis, Me, and the Postcard Winter	Shortlist	
2025	Shari Green	Song of Freedom, Song of Dreams: A Novel in Verse	Shortlist	
2025	Jenny Manzer	Picture a Girl	Shortlist	
2025	Anthony Nerada	Skater Boy	Shortlist	
2026	Léa Taranto	A Drop in the Ocean	Winner	
2026	Tanya Boteju	Messy Perfect	Shortlist	
2026	Gregor Craigie	Saving Wolfgang	Shortlist	
2026	Rachel Hartman	Among Ghosts	Shortlist	
2026	Kim Spencer	I Won't Feel This Way Forever	Shortlist	
