= Iain Lawrence =

Canadian writer

- Born: 1955 (age 70–71); Sault Ste. Marie, Ontario
- Education: Langara College
- Writing career
- Notable works: The Seance; Gemini Summer; Lord of the Nutcracker Men
- Notable awards: Governor General's Award for English-language children's literature (2007); PNBA Award (2007); Vicky Metcalf Award (2011); Sheila A. Egoff Children's Literature Prize (2017)

Iain Lawrence (born 1955) is a Canadian author for children and young adults. In 2007 he won a Governor General's Literary Award in Children's Literature for Gemini Summer, and in 2011, he was presented with the Vicky Metcalf Award for Literature for Young People.

== Biography ==
Lawrence was born in Sault Ste. Marie, Ontario, in 1955. He has lived on Gabriola Island since 2000. Lawrence attended Langara College in Vancouver studying journalism. After school he worked for the Prince Rupert Daily News and other newspapers in northern British Columbia. In his free time he wrote a number of unpublished children's fiction books, and was able to publish two non-fiction books about sailing, his hobby. A Chicago agent encouraged him to concentrate on children's fiction so he reworked one of his earlier books, The Wrecker, and sold it to Random House in 1994. Since then he has published many more books, in 2007 Random House reported he had sold more than one million books in North America.

== List of books ==
Month and year	Series	Title	Awards
January 2005		Far-Away Places: 50 Anchorages on the Northwest Coast	
May 1998	The High Seas trilogy	The Wreckers	
May 1999	The High Seas trilogy	The Smugglers	
October 2000		Ghost Boy	
August 2001	The High Seas trilogy	The Buccaneers	
October 2001		Lord of the Nutcracker Men	
September 2002		The Lightkeeper's Daughter	
June 2004		B for Buster	
April 2005	The Curse of the Jolly Stone trilogy	The Convicts	
November 2005	The Curse of the Jolly Stone trilogy	The Cannibals	
October 2006		Gemini Summer	
November 2007	The Curse of the Jolly Stone trilogy	The Castaways	
July 2008		The Seance	
November 2009		The Giant-Slayer	
November 2011		The Winter Pony	
January 2016		The Skeleton Tree	
March 2021		Deadman's Castle	
August 2022		Fire on Headless Mountain	

=== Gemini Summer ===
The book was reviewed in Publishers Weekly, Quill and Quire, Kirkus Reviews, CM Magazine, Saskatoon StarPhoenix, The Horn Book Magazine, School Library Journal, Booklist, Library Media Connection, Resource Links, and Books in Canada.

== Awards and honours ==
Nine of Lawrence's books are Junior Library Guild selections: The Wreckers (1998), Lord of the Nutcracker Men (2001), B for Buster (2004), The Convicts (2005), The Cannibals (2006), The Castaways (2008), The Séance (2008), The Skeleton Tree (2016), and Deadman's Castle (2021).

In 2007, the Bank Street College of Education included Gemini Summer on their list of the best children's books of the year.

In 2011, Lawrence received the Vicky Metcalf Award for Literature for Young People, an award presented to Canadian authors whose "body of work ... demonstrates the highest literary standards."

Awards for Lawrence's writing
Year	Title	Award	Result	Ref.
1999	The Wreckers	ALA Best Books for Young Adults	Selection	
1999	The Wreckers	Geoffrey Bilson Award	Winner	
1999	The Wreckers	Quick Picks for Reluctant Young Adult Readers	Selection	
2000	The Smugglers	ALA Best Books for Young Adults	Selection	
2001	Ghost Boy	ALA Best Books for Young Adults	Selection	
2003	The Lightkeeper's Daughter	ALA Best Books for Young Adults	Selection	
2005	B for Buster	ALA Best Books for Young Adults	Top 14	
2006	The Convicts	Sheila A. Egoff Children's Literature Prize	Finalist	
2007	Gemini Summer	Governor General's Award for English-Language Children's Literature	Winner	
2007	Gemini Summer	Pacific Northwest Booksellers Association Award	Winner	
2007	Gemini Summer	Sheila A. Egoff Children's Literature Prize	Finalist	
2009	The Seance	Sheila A. Egoff Children's Literature Prize	Finalist	
2010	The Giant-Slayer	ALSC Notable Children's Books	Selection	
2011	The Giant-Slayer	Chocolate Lily Young Readers’ Choice Award	Winner	
2017	The Skeleton Tree	Canadian Children's Book Centre Awards: Fan's Choice Award	Winner	
2017	The Skeleton Tree	Sheila A. Egoff Children's Literature Prize	Winner	
2017	The Skeleton Tree	TD Canadian Children's Literature Award	Finalist	

== Publications ==
- The Skeleton Tree (2016)
- The Giant-Slayer (2009)
- The Seance (July 2008)
- Gemini Summer (October 2006)
- B for Boi (June 2004)
- The Lightkeeper's Daughter (September 2002)
- Lord of the Nutcracker Men (October 2001)
- Ghost Boy (October 2000)

=== The Curse of the Jolly Stone trilogy ===
- The Convicts (April 2004)
- The Cannibals (November 2005)
- The Castaways (November 2007)

=== The Wreckers series ===
- The Wreckers (May 1998)
- The Smugglers (May 1999)
- The Buccaneers (August 2001)

=== Non-fiction ===
- Far-Away Places: 50 Anchorages on the Northwest Coast (April 1995)
