= Everything on a Waffle =

Novel by Polly Horvath

- First edition book cover
- Author: Polly Horvath
- Cover artist: Gina Freschet
- Language: English
- Genre: Children's novel
- Publisher: Farrar, Straus and Giroux
- Publication date: April 4, 2001
- Publication place: United States
- Media type: Hardcover and Paperback; Audio CD and cassette
- Pages: 150 pp
- ISBN: 0-374-32236-8
- OCLC: 43845530
- LC Class: PZ7.H79224 Ev 2001

Everything on a Waffle is a 2001 bestselling children's novel, written by Polly Horvath and published by Farrar, Straus and Giroux. The book was critically acclaimed and won a variety of awards, including the 2002 Newbery Honor. A sequel, One Year in Coal Harbour, was published in 2012.

== Plot summary ==
Everything on a Waffle, set in a small Canadian community of Coal Harbor fishing village, tells the story of an eleven-year-old girl named Primrose Squarp. One night, a storm hits their town. Her father is out to sea during the storm, so her mother leaves Primrose with a neighbor while she takes a boat out to go find him. Primrose's parents disappear in the typhoon, but Primrose refuses to believe they are dead and doesn't attend their memorial service.

While she defends her family's survival, her custody situation moves around from aging neighbor Miss Perfidy to her preoccupied, but caring Uncle Jack. The only thing that remains constant is her enjoyment of a restaurant called the Girl on the Red Swing, where each menu item is served on a waffle. Restaurant owner Kate Bowzer takes Primrose under her wing. She teaches her how to cook (recipes are all cited in a notepad). She doesn't question or criticize her, even through her odd predicaments, such as accidentally setting the class guinea pig on fire.

Primrose is taken from the custody of her uncle Jack after a series of accidents, including losing a toe and part of her finger. Uncle Jack is said to be fighting "tooth and nail" for custody of her. As a foster kid, she is put into the home of an older couple, Evie and Bert. Although they are all fond of each other, Primrose does not seem able to develop an attachment to them, likely because of her history of unstable living.

While in foster care, the mental state of Primrose's former guardian, Miss Perfidy, quickly deteriorates. While Primrose is visiting her in the hospital, Miss Perfidy dies, but Primrose does not exhibit much of a reaction.

Through her oddities and accidents, Primrose becomes a town curiosity, with neighbors questioning her emotional state. She gathers many stories from many people regarding times when they have "just known" something was true, even though they mightn't have had proof. This helps develop the main theme of this strange story: hope is not crazy. But even through all of this, Primrose never gives up hope in finding her parents and being a normal family again. Primrose is eventually returned to her uncle, but remains in contact with Bert and Evie, as they see her as a granddaughter figure. Later on, her parents come back, which is a real shock to everyone in town. Uncle Jack faints upon seeing them alive, and Primrose embraces her parents. They reveal that the storm had washed them up on a shore, where they had survived until they flagged down a passing-by ship.

== Awards ==
Awards for Everything on a Waffle
Year	Award	Result	Ref.
2001	Boston Globe–Horn Book Award for Fiction and Poetry	Honor	
2001	Mr. Christie's Book Award: English, Ages 8 to 11	Winner	
2002	ALSC Notable Children's Book	Selection	
2002	Newbery Medal	Honor	
2002	Sheila A. Egoff Children's Literature Prize	Winner	
