= The Grave (novel) =

2000 novel by James Heneghan

- Recent paperback cover
- Author: James Heneghan
- Language: English
- Genre: Novel
- Published: 2000, Farrar, Straus & Giroux (first edition, hardcover), Laurel-Leaf (re-released paperback)
- Media type: Print (Hardback & Paperback)
- ISBN: 0-88899-414-1 (paperback) ISBN 0-374-32765-3 (hardcover)
- OCLC: 44751787

The Grave is a time travel novel by Canadian author James Heneghan, set in 1970s Liverpool and in Ireland and Liverpool in the mid-nineteenth century. The novel was published in 2000.

== Plot summary ==
The protagonist of the novel is a 13-year-old orphan named Tom Mullen. He lives in the Old Swan area of Liverpool with his hostile foster parents and his "brother", Brian.

One night, Tom and Brian creep out to investigate a mysterious excavation near their school and discover that the workmen have uncovered an old graveyard. As Tom is examining the burial ground, he falls into the dark endless pit.

Tom wakes up in the countryside near the sea. He sees a group of people gathered around the body of a drowned boy who looks exactly like Tom. Everyone thinks the boy is dead, but Tom does CPR and saves him. The boy's name is Tully Monaghan, and Tom is invited to live with his family. As Tom walks into their cottage, he notices a newspaper saying that the date is September 1847. He is not only somehow in Ireland, he has traveled back in time to the height of the Great Famine.

When the villagers come under attack from the owners of the land, Tom gets hit on the head and is catapulted back to his own time, 1974. He is devastated that he is no longer with the friendly Monaghans. During football practice Tom realizes he can simply jump back into the pit to return to the past. When he does this, however, he discovers that the Monaghans' cottage has been all but destroyed, Tully's father is dead, and the family has decided to move to Liverpool. Tom goes with them, but later again accidentally returns to the modern day.

The next night Tom once again jumps down into the grave. He returns to old Liverpool on March 13, 1848 – four months since he last saw the Monaghans. Tully's mother is now very ill with fever and his brother Brendan catches it too; both die in hospital.

Tom tells Tully and his sister Hannah, the only remaining members of the family, about his coming from the future. They figure out that Tully is Tom's great-grandfather and that the reason why Tom came to the past was that if Tully had died on the beach, Tom would never have been born. Tom decides to return to his own time, only to be literally kicked out of the house by his foster parents. That night Tom goes to the grave, takes Ma's and Brendan's coffins and buries them in a church graveyard.

A few months later, Tom's football coach asks him why he changed his last name to Monaghan. It turns out that the coach is Tom's long-lost father.

== Awards and honours ==
The Grave is a Junior Library Guild book.

Awards for The Grave
Year	Award	Result	Ref.
2001	Sheila A. Egoff Children's Literature Prize	Winner	
2000	Mr. Christie's Book Awards	Silver Seal	
