= The Seance =

The Seance or The Séance may refer to:

- Séance, an attempt to communicate with spirits
- The Seance (album), by the Hampton Hawes Trio
- The Seance (Harwood novel), a 2008 novel by John Harwood
- The Seance (Lawrence novel), a 2008 novel by Iain Lawrence
- "The Séance", a 1951 episode of I Love Lucy

== See also ==
- Seance (disambiguation)
