= Dance of the Snow Dragon =

1995 novel by Eileen Kernaghan

- Author: Eileen Kernaghan
- Publisher: Thistledown Press
- Publication date: 1995
- Pages: 325
- ISBN: 978-1-8954-4941-9
- OCLC: 36621533

Dance of the Snow Dragon is a 1995 novel by the Canadian writer Eileen Kernaghan, published by Thistledown Press. Set in 18th-century Bhutan, the novel is a coming-of-age story following Sangay, a young yak herder, as he journeys to Shambhala.

== Development and reception ==
The novel incorporates elements of Tibetan Buddhism, which Kernaghan first discovered while editing interviews of the Dalai Lama and perusing related literature. A review in Books in Canada called the prose "lushly cinematic", noting elaborate descriptions of the setting, but found the plot and characters uninteresting. Mark Harris of the Vancouver Sun found the novel to be too safe, unable to "earn the disapproval of even the strictest of abbots". The writer and critic Denise Dumars, however, enjoyed the novel's "colorful" characters in a review for Cinescape. The Edmonton Journal's Douglas Barbour also commended Kernaghan's writing style.
