= Vicky Metcalf Award for Literature for Young People =

Canadian literary award

The Vicky Metcalf Award for Literature for Young People, colloquially called the Vicky, is given annually at the Writers' Trust Awards to a writer or illustrator whose body of work has been "inspirational to Canadian youth". It is a top honour for Canadian children's writers and Canadian children's book illustrators.

Vicky Metcalf, a Canadian librarian, established the award "in 1963 to stimulate the writing of literature for Canadian children." Before 2013, the prize was known as the Vicky Metcalf Award for Children's Literature. The award is sponsored by the Metcalf Foundation, whose objective "is to enhance the effectiveness of people and organizations working together to help Canadians imagine and build a just, healthy and creative society." In 2002, the award was taken over by the Writers' Trust of Canada from the Canadian Authors Association.

To be eligible for the award, recipients must be Canadian citizens or permanent residents, have published a minimum of four English-language children's book, and have published at least one first-edition book in the previous three years. Winners are selected by a three-person jury and receive $25,000 CAD.

== Winners ==
=== 20th Century ===
Award winners, 1963–1999
Year	Winner	Ref.
1963	Kerry Wood	
1964	John F. Hayes	
1965	Roderick Haig-Brown	
1966	Fred Swayze	
1967	John Patrick Gillese	
1968	Lorrie McLaughlin	
1969	Audrey McKim	
1970	Farley Mowat	
1971	Kay Hill	
1972	William Toye	
1973	Christie Harris	
1974	Jean Little	
1975	Lyn Harrington	
1976	Suzanne Martel	
1977	James Archibald Houston	
1978	Lyn Cook	
1979	Cliff Faulknor	
1980	John Craig	
1981	Monica Hughes	
1982	Janet Lunn	
1983	Claire Mackay	
1984	Bill Freeman	
1985	Edith Fowke	
1986	Dennis Lee	
1987	Robert Munsch	
1988	Barbara Smucker	
1989	Stéphane Poulin	
1990	Bernice Thurman Hunter	
1991	Brian Doyle	
1992	Kevin Major	
1993	Phoebe Gilman	
1994	Welwyn Wilton Katz	
1995	Sarah Ellis	
1996	Margaret Buffie	
1997	Tim Wynne-Jones	
1998	Kit Pearson	
1999	Joan Clark	
2000	Sheree Fitch	

=== 21st Century ===
Award winners, 2000–present
Year	Winner	Selected works	Ref.
2001	Linda Granfield		
2002	Julie Johnston		
2003	Roslyn Schwartz		
2004	Deborah Ellis		
2005	Marie-Louise Gay		
2006	Kenneth Oppel		
2007	Martha Brooks		
2008	Michael Kusugak		
2009	Marthe Jocelyn		
2010	Polly Horvath		
2011	Iain Lawrence	The Winter Pony; Gemini Summer; The Convicts; The Smugglers; The Wreckers	
2012	Paul Yee	Money Boy; Dead Man’s Gold and Other Stories; Ghost Train; Tales from Gold Mountain; Teach Me to Fly, Skyfighter!	
2013	Barbara Reid	The Night Before Christmas; Picture a Tree; Perfect Snow; The Party; Sing a Song of Mother Goose	
2014	Cary Fagan	The Show to End All Shows; Mr. Zinger’s Hat; Jacob Two-Two on the High Seas; Thing-Thing; The Market Wedding	
2015	Jan Thornhill	Kyle Goes Alone; This is My Planet; I Found a Dead Bird; The Rumor; The Wildlife 123	
2016	Alan Cumyn	Hot Pterodactyl Boyfriend; Tilt; Dear Sylvia; After Sylvia; The Secret Life of Owen Skye	
2017	Ruby Slipperjack	Dear Canada: These Are My Words; Dog Tracks; Little Voice; Silent Words; Honour the Sun	
2018	Christopher Paul Curtis	The Journey of Little Charlie; The Madman of Piney Woods; Elijah of Buxton; Bud, Not Buddy; The Watsons Go to Birmingham	
2019	Susin Nielsen	No Fixed Address; Optimists Die First; We Are All Made of Molecules; Word Nerd	
2020	Marianne Dubuc	The Lion and the Bird; The Bus Ride Up the Mountain Path; Otto and Pio; Little Cheetah's Shadow	
2021	Linda Bailey	Stanley's Party Toads on Toasy; The Tiny Hero of Ferny Creek Library; Mary Who Wrote Frankenstein; Princesses Versus Dinosaurs	
2022	Elise Gravel	Le Grand Antonio (2014) / The Great Antonio (2017)	
2023	Kyo Maclear	Bloom: A Story of Fashion Designer Elsa Schiaparelli; Operatic; It Began with a Page: How Gyo Fujikawa Drew the Way	
2024	Sara O'Leary		
2025	Julie Flett		
2026	Cherie Dimaline		
