= The Alchemist's Daughter =

2004 novel by Eileen Kernaghan

- Book cover
- Author: Eileen Kernaghan
- Language: English
- Genre: Historical fantasy
- Publisher: Thistledown Press
- Awards: Best Canadian Speculative Novel in English (Prix Aurora Awards 2005); 2006 Manitoba Young Readers' Choice Award; Publishing In Education Award 2005 at the Saskatchewan Book Awards
- ISBN: 9781894345798

The Alchemist's Daughter is a young adult historical fantasy, set in Elizabethan England a year before the Spanish Armada, in which Sidonie Quince attempts to save her father from the consequences of a rash night with the Queen. It was written by Eileen Kernaghan and published in 2004.

The Alchemist's Daughter was shortlisted for the Sheila A. Egoff Children's Literature Prize at the BC Book Prizes 2005, Best Canadian Speculative Novel in English at the Prix Aurora Awards 2005, the 2006 Manitoba Young Readers' Choice Award, and the Publishing In Education Award 2005 at the Saskatchewan Book Awards.
