= Seance (disambiguation) =

A séance is an attempt to contact spirits.

Seance or seances may also refer to:

- Seance (band), a Swedish death metal band
- Seance (album), by Australian rock band the Church
- Séance (album), by Swedish black metal band Dark Fortress
- Séance (2001 film), a Japanese horror film directed by Kiyoshi Kurosawa
- Derren Brown: Séance, a 2004 special by illusionist Derren Brown
- Séance (2006 film), an American horror film
- Seance (2021 film), an American-British horror film directed by Simon Barrett
- Seances (film), lost Guy Maddin film project
- "Séance", a season 4 episode of Servant (TV series)

== See also ==
- The Seance (disambiguation)
