= Linda Granfield =

American-Canadian writer

- Born: November 22, 1950 (age 75); Medford, Massachusetts
- Citizenship: United States of America; Canada
- Education: Salem State College (BA, 1972); Northeastern University, (MA, 1974)
- Spouse: Cal Smiley (1978–present)
- Children: 2
- Writing career
- Notable awards: Vicky Metcalf Award (2009)

Linda Granfield (born November 22, 1950, in Medford) is an American-Canadian writer of nearly thirty nonfiction children's books. In 2001, she received the Vicky Metcalf Award for Literature for Young People, an honour bestowed by the Writers' Trust of Canada to a writer or illustrator whose body of work has been "inspirational to Canadian youth".

== Personal life and education ==
Granfield was born November 22, 1950, in Medford, Massachusetts, to Joseph J. and Barbara H. (née Boyd) Granfield. She had a younger brother who died when she was in the fifth grade.

Granfield studied at Oxford University in 1971 before transferring to Salem State College, where she received a Bachelor of Arts degree in 1972, having majored in English with a double minor in Education and French. She received a Master of Arts degree in English from Northeastern University in 1974. Later that year, she moved to Canada to begin her doctoral studies at the University of Toronto, where she studied Victorian literature for two years.

While at the University of Toronto, Granfield met Cal Smiley, whom she married in 1978. She has two children: Devon Marie and Brian Lindsay.

Granfield is a dual-citizen in the United States and Canada.

== Career ==
While at a Canadian Booksellers Association conference, Granfield was approached by a representative from Kids Can Press, who asked, "When are you going to stop writing ABOUT children's books and write one yourself?" Based on this interaction, she decided to write her first children's book, All about Niagara Falls, which was published in 1988. She has since written nearly thirty children's books, which have won her numerous local and national awards.

Aside from writing, Granfield has been influential in various historical and factual endeavors, including being a consultant for various documentary films. Along with being "a historical adviser for the Royal Canadian Air Force," she was "a member of the 'In Flanders Fields at 100' task force that successfully nominated John McCrae for membership in the Canadian Medical Hall of Fame."

== Awards and honors ==
In 2001, Granfield received the Vicky Metcalf Award for Literature for Young People, an honour bestowed by the Writers' Trust of Canada to a writer or illustrator whose body of work has been "inspirational to Canadian youth".

I Remember Korea is a Junior Library Guild book.

Awards for Granfield's writing
Year	Title	Award	Result	Ref.
1994	Cowboy	Information Book Award	Winner	
1995	In Flanders Fields	IODE Jean Throop Book Award	Winner	
1996	In Flanders Fields	Information Book Award	Winner	
1997	Silent Night	Alcuin Society Awards for Excellence in Book Design in Canada	Winner	
1998	In Flanders Fields	Red Cedar Book Award	Winner	
2001	Pier 21	Information Book Award	Honour	
2001	Pier 21	Norma Fleck Award	Finalist	
2002	Where Poppies Grow	Information Book Award	Winner	
2009	Remembering John McCrae	IODE Jean Throop Book Award	Winner	

== Selected texts ==
- All about Niagara Falls: Fascinating Facts, Dramatic Discoveries, illustrated by Pat Cupples, Kids Can Press (1988)
- Canada Votes: How We Elect Our Government, illustrated by Bill Slavin, Kids Can Press (1990)
- Extra! Extra!: The Who, What, When, Where, and Why of Newspapers, illustrated by Bill Slavin, Kids Can Press (1993)
- The Make-Your-Own-Button Book, illustrated by Andrea Wayne-Von Kongislow, Hyperion Books for Children (1994)
- Cowboy: An Album, Douglas & McIntyre (1993)
- In Flanders Fields: The Story of the Poem by John McCrae, illustrated by Janet Wilson, Lester Publishing (1995)
- Amazing Grace: The Story of the Hymn, illustrated by Janet Wilson, Tundra Books (1997)
- Silent Night: The Song from Heaven, illustrated by Nelly and Ernst Hofer, Tundra Books (1997)
- Postcards Talk, illustrated by Mark Thurman, Pembroke (1997)
- The Legend of the Panda, Tundra Books (1997)
- Circus, Groundwood Books (1997)
- Brain Quest Canada: 1,000 Questions and Answers: People, Places, Culture, and Historic Events (card format), with Pat Hancock, illustrated by Kimble Mead, Allen (1998)
- High Flight: A Story of World War II, illustrated by Michael Martchenko, Tundra Books (1999)
- Pier 21: Gateway of Hope, Tundra Books (2000)
- Where Poppies Grow: A World War I Companion, Stoddart (2001)
- 97 Orchard Street, New York, photographs by Arlene Alda, Tundra Books (2001)
- Brass Buttons and Silver Horseshoes: Stories from Canada's British War Brides, McClelland & Stewart (2002)
- I Remember Korea: Veterans Tell Their Stories of the Korean War, 1950-53, Clarion (2003)

=== "The Year I Was Born" series ===
"The Year I Was Born" books are illustrated by Bill Slavin and Kids Can Press.

- The Year I Was Born—1987 (1994)
- The Year I Was Born—1988 (1995)
- The Year I Was Born—1984 (1996)
