= The Reluctant Journal of Henry K. Larsen =

2012 young adult novel by Susin Nielsen

- Cover of The Reluctant Journal of Henry K. Larsen
- Author: Susin Nielsen
- Cover artist: Jennifer Lum
- Language: English
- Publisher: Tundra Books
- Publication place: Canada/United States of America
- Pages: 243
- ISBN: 978-1-77049-372-8

The Reluctant Journal of Henry K. Larsen is a young adult novel by Canadian author Susin Nielsen, first published in 2012. It deals with the effects of a school shooting on the shooter's family.

== Inspiration ==
"I was reading a book by Wally Lamb called The Hour I First Believed. One of his characters was present at a horrific school Homicide. There was a line in the book that mentioned that one of the shooters had an older brother. That just punched me in the gut; I realized I had never thought about what it would be like for the surviving sibling of someone who committed a horrific crime. From there, Jesse and Henry were born. Jesse, relentlessly bullied to the point of murder/suicide; Henry, the brother left behind".

== Plot summary ==
After his older brother takes his dad's gun to school to kill himself and his bully, Henry K. Larsen is thrown into a brand new town and a brand new school in order to escape the anger of his old friends and neighbors. In this new town, Henry fights to keep knowledge of the "IT" from tainting his new friends' views of him the way it did back home. Henry begins to understand what it means to grieve for a loved one who has committed suicide, even through your anger. Through his own experience at school Henry starts to realize the desperate position his brother was in and the impact that bullying had not only on his brother but on his new friends now. Henry never sugarcoats how he feels and explores the emotions he knows he should not have.

== Characters ==
- Henry Larsen: the main character, he has to build a new world. In a new city, where no one knows what happened. His therapist recommended him to write a diary.
- Jesse Larsen: Henry's older brother. He killed himself and his bully, Scott Marlin, with his dad's rifle gun after being intensely bullied by Scott and his friends.
- Scott Marlin: Jesse Larsen's bully and Jodie Marlin's older brother.
- Farley Wong: Henry's best friend after he and his dad move, and one of Henry's Reach for the Top teammates.
- Alberta: Henry's friend and love interest. She is also one of Henry's Reach for the Top teammates.
- Henry's Mom (Francine Larsen): During the events of the book, she is in Ontario staying with her parents, and dealing with her own problems in the aftermath of "IT".
- Henry's Dad (Pete Larsen): He cares for Henry after the move while his wife (Francine) is in Ontario.
- Mr. Atapattu: Resident in Henry's apartment complex. Next door neighbor and somewhat friend to Henry.
- Karen Vargas: Resident in Henry's apartment complex. She seems interested in Henry's dad, but soon becomes a help to Henry as he sorts out his feelings.
- Cecil Levine: Henry's psychiatrist who Henry dislikes. Cecil gives Henry the diary in the first place. This is so Henry can write about his feelings.
- Troy Vasic: Bullies Farley and Henry at the new school, and later in the book, steals upwards of $200 from Farley.
- Jodie Marlin: Scott Marlin's sister and Henry's best friend growing up before "IT" happened. Henry was unable to contact Jodie after "IT", because her father forbid it.
- Parvana: One of Henry's Reach for the Top teammates
- Shen: One of Henry's Reach for the Top teammates
- Ambrose: One of Henry's Reach for the Top teammates, Ambrose was also the main character in the book "Word Nerd", also written by Susin Nielsen.
- Jerome: One of Henry's Reach for the Top teammates
- Koula: One of Henry's Reach for the Top teammates

== Awards ==
Awards for The Reluctant Journal of Henry K. Larsen
| Year | Award | Result | Ref. |
|---|---|---|---|
| 2012 | Governor General's Award for English-language children's literature | Winner | |
| 2013 | Canadian Library Association Book of the Year for Children Award | Winner | |
| 2013 | Ruth and Sylvia Schwartz Award | Winner | |
| 2013 | Sheila A. Egoff Children's Literature Prize | Finalist | |
| 2014 | Forest of Reading Red Maple Award | Winner | |
| 2014 | Snow Willow Award | Nominee | |
| 2014 | TD Canadian Children's Literature Award | Finalist | |
