= Lord of the Nutcracker Men =

Novel by Iain Lawrence

- Lord of the Nutcracker Men by Iain Lawrence, new edition cover
- Author: Iain Lawrence
- Publisher: Delacorte Press
- Publication date: October 2001

Lord of the Nutcracker Men is a novel by Canadian author Iain Lawrence that takes place in England during the first year of World War I. The book was first published in October 2001 by the Delacorte Press, and it was later reprinted in May 2003 by Dell-Laurel Leaf, an imprint of a division of Random House, Inc. The book has become a bestseller, and is included in the required reading lists of many American high schools.

== Plot summary ==
The part of the story taking place in England where Johnny's father has enlisted is told mainly through letters sent back home to his family. Through the letters it is possible to tell that the November 25 until December 26, 1914. At the beginning of the book Johnny and his family live in London, however Johnny is sent to live with his Aunt Ivy in the town of Cliffe soon after his father enlists. His mother moves to the town of Woolwich, also sending letters to Johnny every chapter, to help support the war by getting a job making weaponry in a factory.

A main theme of the book is the pointlessness and irrationality of war. After the protagonist, Johnny Briggs, misses school for two days in order to have more time to build his Guy Fawkes, he is forced to spend every Wednesday and Saturday afternoon at his teacher's house. There, his teacher, Mr. Tuttle, tutors him on classic literature, mainly the Iliad. They both draw direct parallels between the events of World War I and the events of Homer's novel.

It is during the beginning of the book that he is bullied, but when saved by Sarah is entirely ungrateful and says "a girl for a friend is like no friend at all." This is why he leaves the school. When she saves him from being thrown in the fire he starts to see her as a friend.

At the beginning of the book, Johnny's father appears enthusiastic about going to war, so much that at the beginning he is frustrated that he lacks the half-inch of height required to enlist. After the required height is lowered, he joins the war and is moved to the front line afterward. As the war continues, it takes its toll on Johnny's father's health, physique, and mentality. Johnny's father sends his son a newly whittled and painted soldier with every letter, but his creations appear increasingly grotesque throughout the book. This is reflected in the model of himself that he had sent. The brown paint of his clothes turns a moldy green, the wide grin on its face fades to a grim, mournful expression, a hairline crack comes down his chest, and a knothole begins to form in its chest.

The book comes to a close when Johnny stops playing with his nutcracker soldiers, and brings them together for the Christmas Truce of 1914. The war continues without Johnny's interference, and his father returns four years later in 1918. Johnny's mother dies from sulfur poisoning in 1923, demonstrating that some of the most valiant sacrifices of World War I came not from the front lines, but from the work force at home.

== Characters ==
- Johnny Briggs: The protagonist and narrator of the story, who thinks that the battles of World War I reflect the ones he reenacts with his toy nutcracker soldiers
- Mrs. Briggs: The mother of the protagonist, who moves to Woolwich to work in an Arsenal
- James Briggs: Johnny’s father, a cheery and pretty clever toymaker, who sends his son wooden soldier men that he carves and paints in the trenches
- Auntie Ivy: After Johnny's father enlists, his mother sends him to live with his aunt, a caring, self-professed lonely woman
- Hubert Tuttle: Johnny's schoolteacher, an intelligent, ethical man who threatens to leave Cliffe after his roses are destroyed.

== Reception ==
Lord of the Nutcracker Men was well received by critics, including starred reviews from Kirkus Reviews and Publishers Weekly.

Publishers Weekly referred to the novel as "thoughtful and thought-provoking", while Kirkus Reviews called it an "original piece of historical fiction in which big themes are hauntingly conveyed through gripping personal story and eerie symbolism".

According to Booklist's Hazel Rochman, Lord of the Nutcracker Men provides readers with "a fine introduction to World War I, both for personal interest and for curriculum use", though "at first the book moves slowly" and it relies to heavily on metaphor, with "a fatherly teacher to spell things out and compare the war to The Iliad". However, Rochman found "realism in the grief" conveyed through various characters.

Booklist and School Library Journal also reviewed the audiobook narrated by Steven Crossley, with School Library Journal's Edith Ching highlighting how "the recording enhances the plot development and characterization". Ching further praised Crossley for his "masterful job of capturing 10-year-old Johnny's innocence about the war and about life, as well as the vast emotional range of the adults in his world".
