= Robin Stevenson =

Canadian writer of children's books

- Education: McMaster University
- Occupation: Author
- Writing career
- Genres: Children's and young adults' fiction and nonfiction
- Notable awards: Sheila A. Egoff Children's Literature Prize (2020)
- Website: robinstevenson.com

Robin Stevenson is a Canadian author of thirty books for kids and teens. Her writing has been translated into several languages, and published in more than a dozen countries. Robin's books regularly receive starred reviews, have won the Silver Birch Award, the Sheila A. Egoff Children's Literature Prize and a Stonewall Book Award, and have been finalists for the Governor General's Awards, the Lambda Literary Award, and others. She writes both fiction and non-fiction, for toddlers through teens.

Robin Stevenson was born in England and immigrated to Canada as a child. She grew up in Ontario and studied at McMaster University in Hamilton before completing a master's degree in social work at Wilfrid Laurier University in Kitchener. Robin worked as a social worker and counselor for 10 years and in 2022, she received Wilfrid Laurier university's alumna of the Year award.

Stevenson writes well-researched nonfiction about history and activism, including LGBT issues and abortion rights, and about historical and contemporary figures known for their contributions to the world in areas such as social justice, leadership, innovation, and athletics. She also writes picture books, including Pride Puppy, and middle grade novels, such as Record Breaker and The Summer We Saved the Bees. She has written a number of contemporary young adult novels, the most recent of which, When You Get the Chance, was co-written with Nova Scotia based author Tom Ryan. School Library Journal gave it a positive review: "Readers will appreciate the tender depiction of growing apart and breakups, and the concept of nonmonogamous relationships is also explored without stigma... A solidly entertaining trip through Canada’s queer history, and one family’s difficult secrets. Recommended for fans of lightly adventurous realistic fiction."

Stevenson is queer.

== Awards and honors ==
Stevenson's In the Woods is a Junior Library Guild book.

In 2013, the Bank Street College of Education included Hummingbird Heart on their list of the best books of the year for kids aged fourteen and older.

In 2017, Pride was included on the annual USBBY Outstanding International Books List.

In 2019, School Library Journal included My Body My Choice on their list of the best nonfiction children's books of the year. Kirkus Reviews gave the book a starred review and said, "Well-researched and visually appealing, this is a boon for those seeking clear, comprehensive information from the perspective of the reproductive rights movement."

In 2020, the Bank Street College of Education and the Cooperative Children's Book Center named Pride Colors one of the best children's books of the year. The same year, Booklist included My Body, My Choice on their "Top 10 Health & Wellness for Youth" list.

Awards for Stevenson's writing
Year	Title	Award	Result	Ref.
2009	A Thousand Shades of Blue	Governor General's Award for English-language children's literature	Finalist	
2009	A Thousand Shades of Blue	Sheila A. Egoff Children's Literature Prize	Finalist	
2010	Inferno	ALA Rainbow Book List	Selection	
2010	Inferno	Sheila A. Egoff Children's Literature Prize	Finalist	
2014	Record Breaker	Silver Birch Award	Winner	
2014	Record Breaker	Sheila A. Egoff Children's Literature Prize	Finalist	
2017	Pride	Sheila A. Egoff Children's Literature Prize	Finalist	
2017	Pride	Stonewall Book Award	Honor	
2018	Blood on the Beach	John Spray Mystery Award	Finalist	
2020	Pride Colors	Lambda Literary Award for Children's and Young Adult Literature	Finalist	
2020	My Body, My Choice	Sheila A. Egoff Children's Literature Prize	Winner	
2020	My Body, My Choice	Rise: A Feminist Book Project	Selection	

== Content challenges ==
In 2019, Stevenson was scheduled to visit Longfellow Elementary School in Wheaton, Illinois to discuss her book Kid Activists. However, the day before the event, she was informed the presentation was cancelled because a parent was concerned about whether she would discuss Harvey Milk, a gay rights activist, who appears on the book's cover. Shortly after, representative Terra Costa Howard rescheduled the event at a local high school. Responding to the event, Stevenson stated, "I think one parent should not be able to have the power to prevent probably six or seven classes from hearing the talk," and that "when the reason given for the concern is so clearly rooted in homophobia we should not validate that. By doing so [the school] perpetuates a really harmful message."

In 2022, Freedom to Read named Stevenson their "champion of free expression," given that many of her books—both fiction and nonfiction—have been the target of challenges due to their content.

The same year, the Greenville County, South Carolina resolved to remove children's books with LGBT+ content from public libraries. Although Stevenson's Pride Puppy was not presently held in the county's library system, it was explicitly named in the list of books to be excluded from the library system.

== Publications ==
=== Picture books ===
- Ghost’s Journey: A Refugee Story (2019)
- Pride Colors (2019)
- Pride Puppy, illustrated by Julie McLaughlin (2021)
- A Hug on the Wind, illustrated by Kristina Jones (2025)

=== Children's nonfiction books ===
- My Body My Choice: The Fight for Abortion Rights (2019)
- Pride: The Celebration and the Struggle (2020)

==== Kid Legends series ====
- Kid Activists: True Tales of Childhood from Champions of Change, illustrated by Allison Steinfeld (2019)
- Kid Innovators: True Tales of Childhood from Inventors and Trailblazers, illustrated by Allison Steinfeld (2021)
- Kid Trailblazers: True Tales of Childhood from Changemakers and Leaders, illustrated by Allison Steinfeld (2022)

=== Early chapter books ===
- Ben’s Robot, illustrated by David Parkins (2010)
- Ben the Inventor, illustrated by David Parkins (2011)

=== Middle grade books ===
- Impossible Things (2008)
- Liars and Fools (2010)
- Attitude (2013)
- Record Breaker (2013)
- The Summer We Saved the Bees (2015)
- Queer History A-Z: 100 Years of LGBTQ+ Activism, illustrated by Vivian Rosas (2024)

=== Young adult books ===
- Out of Order (2007)
- Big Guy (2008)
- Dead in the Water (2008)
- A Thousand Shades of Blue (2008)
- In the Woods (2009)
- Inferno (2009)
- Escape Velocity (2011)
- Outback (2011)
- Damage (2013)
- The World Without Us (2015)
- Under Threat (2016)
- Blood on the Beach, with Sarah N. Harvey (2017)
- Hummingbird Heart (2019)
- When You Get the Chance, with Tom Ryan (2021)
