= Eileen Kernaghan =

Canadian novelist

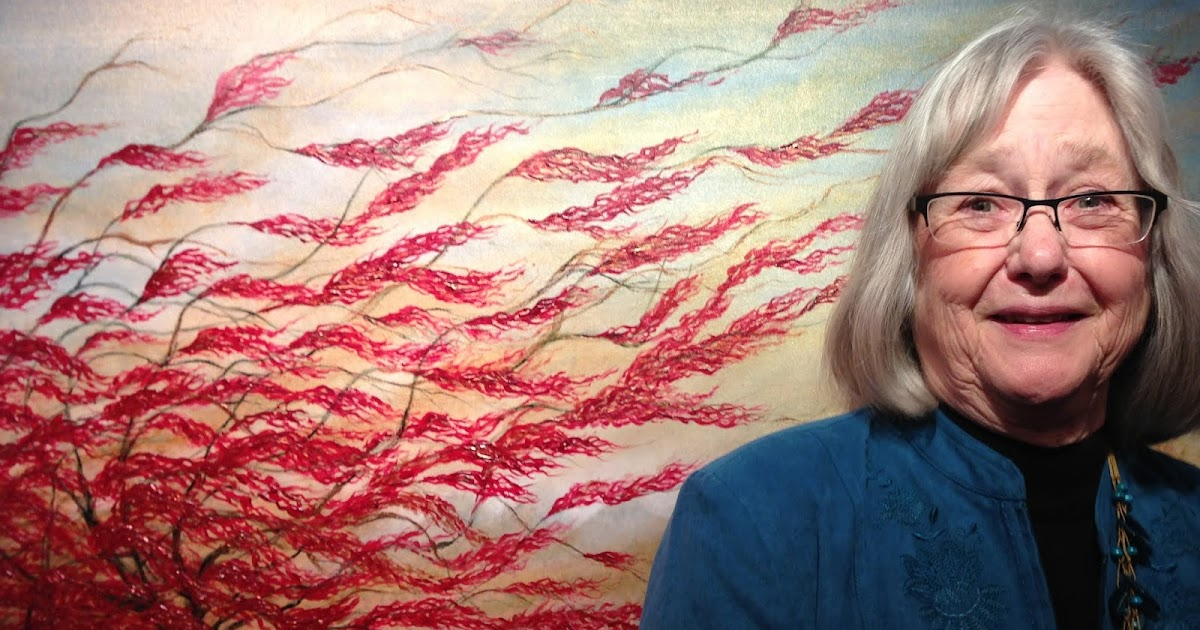
Eileen Kernaghan at the launch of her book Sophie, In Shadow.

Eileen Kernaghan (born January 6, 1939) is a Canadian novelist, poet, and four-time winner of the Prix Aurora Award for English-language Canadian speculative fiction. The settings of her historical fantasy novels range from the prehistoric Indus Valley and eighteenth century Bhutan, to Elizabethan England and nineteenth century Scandinavia. She lives on Saltspring Island, British Columbia.

== Biography ==
Eileen Kernaghan grew up on a dairy farm outside Grindrod, British Columbia, Canada, population 600. The reading material she found on the family shelves - Greek myths, historical novels, G. A. Henty's boys' adventure books, a collection of Weird Tales and Thrilling Wonder Stories - helped to shape her writing career.

Her first published story, written at the age of twelve, appeared in the Vancouver Sun newspaper. It earned her a byline, an illustration, and a check for $12.65. Her next appearance in print, twenty years later, was with a cover story in the New York science fiction magazine Galaxy. She went on to write the "Grey Isles" series, a Bronze Age trilogy based on the origins of Stonehenge. Journey to Aprilioth, Songs from the Drowned Lands and The Sarsen Witch were published by Ace Books during the 1980s. Kernaghan was nominated eleven times for Canadian science fiction and fantasy awards, nine Auroras and two Sunburst Awards, winning Aurora Awards for the following titles:

1985: Songs from the Drowned Lands (Ace Books) — novel

1990: “Carpe Diem” (On Spec Fall 1989) — short-form, English

2001: The Snow Queen (Thistledown Press) — long-form work in English

2014: “Night Journey: West Coast ” (Tesseracts Seventeen) — poem/song in English

Her day jobs have included elementary school teaching, arts administration, operating a used bookstore with her husband Pat, and, for many years, teaching creative writing at Shadbolt Centre for the Arts in Burnaby, and Port Moody's Kyle Centre. She has three adult children and four grandchildren.

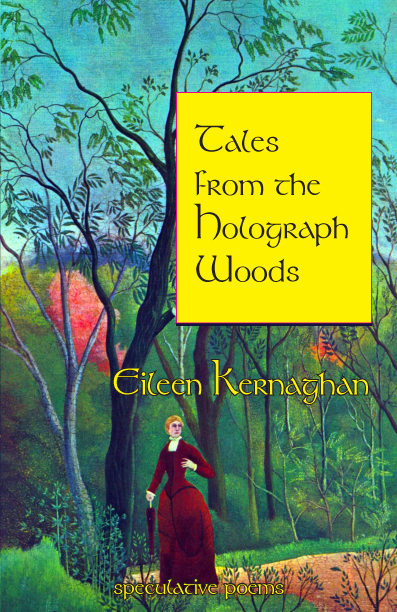
Cover of book, Tales from the Holograph Woods - Speculative Poetry by Eileen Kernaghan

== Bibliography ==
- The Grey Isles sequence:
  - Journey to Aprilioth (1980). New York: Ace. ISBN 978-0-441-38621-5.
  - Songs from the Drowned Lands (1983). New York: Ace. ISBN 978-0-441-77242-1.
  - The Sarsen Witch (1989). New York: Ace. ISBN 978-0-441-75052-8.
- Dance of the Snow Dragon (1995). Saskatoon, Sask: Thistledown Press. ISBN 978-1-895449-41-9.
- The Snow Queen (2000). Saskatoon, Sask: Thistledown Press. ISBN 978-1-894345-14-9.
- The Alchemist's Daughter (2004). Saskatoon, Sask: Thistledown Press. ISBN 978-1-894345-79-8.
- Winter on the Plain of Ghosts: a novel of Mohenjo-daro (2004). New Westminster, BC: Flying Monkey Press. ISBN 978-0-9734012-0-2.
- Wild Talent: A Novel of the Supernatural (2008). Historical fantasy: YA age 14+. Thistledown Press. ISBN 1-897235-40-2 ISBN 978-1-897235-40-9.
- Tales from the Holograph Woods: Speculative Poetry (2009). Wattle and Daub Books. ISBN 978-0981065823
- Dragon-Rain and Other Stories (Kindle Edition) (2013) Neville Books/Flying Monkey Press. Dragon Rain and Other Stories at Amazon.com
- Sophie, in Shadow (2014). Historical fantasy: YA age 14+. Thistledown Press. ISBN 978-1-927068-94-6.

== Sources ==
- "KERNAGHAN, Eileen". Author Bank. BC BookWorld.
- Wolf, C. June (March 28, 2005). "Interview: Eileen Kernaghan, Poet and Novelist". Strange Horizons. Archived from the original on November 13, 2007.
- Schellenberg, James; David M. Switzer (March 10, 2006). "Interview with Eileen Kernaghan". Challenging Destiny.
- "Eileen Kernaghan - Summary Bibliography". isfdb.org. ISFDB.
