= Gemini Summer =

Children's book by Iain Lawrence

Gemini Summer (2006) by Iain Lawrence

Gemini Summer is a children's book by Canadian author Iain Lawrence. It won the 2007 Governor General's Awards in Children's Literature among other awards.

The novel tells the story of a young boy who has to learn to cope with the loss of his brother in a tragic accident. The story, set during the summer of 1964, begins in the Hogs Hollow police station with the sheriff trying to determine where a boy named Danny and his dog, Rocket, came from and how they ended up in that police station miles from home.

== Plot ==
The tale of two young brothers who spend all their time together and enjoy the summer playing like any little boy would do. They would go to their fort that no one knew about and spend all day talking about their dreams. They had their routine and they would stick to it every day until there came a point in time when Beau was embarrassed to be around his family, more so his father this embarrassment came from the fact that his father pumped septic tanks for a living. Although Beau spent less time with his family, he still promised Danny that he would go to the fort every Sunday, and they always did no matter what.

One night, the boys were playing outside near the pit that Old Man River had dug when suddenly Beau fell into the pit and a pole went right through his chest. Mrs. River came running when she heard the screams from Danny. This was an extremely difficult time for the River family and they all took the time to grieve together.

A few months after Beau's death, a hurt stray golden retriever wandered into the yard. Danny wanted nothing to do with this animal as it reminded him too much of his brother and to Danny's surprise, Mrs. River wanted to keep the dog to help it get better. After a week of the dog getting better, Danny decided that he wanted to keep the dog when he looked into the dog's eyes and could have sworn he could see his brother Beau looking back at him. From this time on, Danny spent every day with the dog doing all the brotherly things he and Beau used to do. Danny tried to tell his parents that Beau had come back in the form of a dog and it was okay to be upset. However, they never did believe Danny.

One day, Rocket bit a boy and the police wanted to take Rocket away, but Danny wouldn't have this. So, he and Rocket ran away to pursue the dream that Beau had always wanted. They ran away to meet the famous astronaut Gus Grissom. In the end, Danny is returned home and is able to forever keep his dog. He believes every day that his brother really did come back in the body of this stray dog.

== Characters ==
Beau was just a young boy who wanted to be an astronaut more than anything in the world and knew all the facts about space that a boy could know. He loved to spend time with his brother, talk about his dreams and go to the fort every Sunday. His dreams were cut short when he fell to his death in an accident.

Danny was the younger of the two brothers and his biggest dream was to have a dog but his mother always had the same answer that the city was no place for a dog. When he eventually got a dog, it was when a stray wandered into the yard a few months after Beau's death.

Old Man River pumped septic tanks for a living because when he went off to war, this was the job he was assigned by the military, and when he came home, it was all he knew. The job was never meant to stay permanent and it was something he was ashamed to tell his boys because they had believed that he fought in the war.

Mrs. River was a Southern woman who dreamed of becoming an author and was secretly writing a novel in the basement. She collected Gone With the Wind dolls and dreamed of moving "home" to the South even though she had never been south of Virginia.

== Awards and honors ==
- 2007 Governor General's Award
- 2007 PNBA Book Award
- 2007 Bank Street College Best Book

== Reception ==
The book was reviewed in Publishers Weekly, Quill and Quire, Kirkus Reviews, CM Magazine, Saskatoon StarPhoenix, The Horn Book Magazine, School Library Journal, Booklist, Library Media Connection, Resource Links, and Books in Canada.
