= Maggie de Vries =

Canadian writer

- Born: Maggie de Vries; August 13, 1961 (age 65); Ontario, Canada
- Occupations: Author, children's writer, speaker, teacher
- Awards: Christie Harris Illustrated Children's Literature Prize
- Website: maggiedevries.com

Maggie de Vries (born in 1961 in Ontario, Canada) is a writer for children, teens and adults and creative writing instructor. Her 2010 book, Hunger Journeys and her 2015 book Rabbit Ears both won the Sheila A. Egoff Children's Literature Prize.

== Missing Sarah ==
Missing Sarah is de Vries's best known book; a memoir of her missing adopted sister Sarah de Vries. Sarah was born on May 12, 1969, and the de Vries family adopted her in April 1970. She disappeared from Vancouver's Downtown Eastside in April 1998. Her DNA was found on serial killer Robert Pickton's property in August, 2002. In this book, Maggie remembers her sister’s life through Sarah's journal entries and poems and tells the story of her own search for her sister.

== Social impact ==
From 2000 to 2007, Maggie de Vries was children's book editor at Orca Book Publishers in Victoria, British Columbia. During that time, she served on the board of PACE Society (Prostitution Alternatives Counseling and Education) and coordinated a book club for inner-city women. In the fall of 2005, she was the first Writer-in-Residence at the Vancouver Public Library and in the fall of 2012 she was the first Writer-in-Residence at the University of Northern British Columbia in Prince George, British Columbia.

== Educator ==
In her mid-to-late thirties, de Vries was a substitute teacher for five years. Before that, in the late ’80s, she worked for two years as assistant to children’s author Jean Little (who is also her aunt), traveling with her all over Canada, the United States, and England, and teaching children's literature courses with her at the University of Guelph. Until 2002, she taught children's literature courses regularly in Language and Literacy Education at the UBC, and she taught a graduate course in Canadian children’s literature at Simmons College in Boston in 1994. She has also taught creative writing at Langara Community College in Vancouver. Since 2003, she has taught a yearly graduate course in writing, publishing, and the book trade in the Masters in Children’s Literature program at UBC. Since 2007 she has taught Writing for Children and Young Adults in UBC's Creative Writing Department.

She received her B.A. in English from UBC in 1984, her M.A. also in English in 1992, and her Bachelor of Education, Elementary in 1994. She has also attended McGill University and the University of Guelph.

== Awards ==
Maggie de Vries has received awards or honours for most of her works.

In 2015, Rabbit Ears won the Sheila A. Egoff Children's Literature Prize.

In 2012, Somebody's Girl was a Diamond Willow Award nominee.

In 2011, Hunger Journeys won the Sheila A. Egoff Children's Literature Prize.

In 2007, Tale of a Great White Fish: A Sturgeon Story won the Christie Harris Illustrated Children's Literature Prize, won the 2006 ASPCA Henry Bergh Children’s Book Award and was a Silver Birch Express Honour Book.

Missing Sarah: A Memoir of Loss was a 2003 Governor General's Literary Award for Non-Fiction nominee, won both the 2004 George Ryga Award for Social Awareness in BC Literature and the 2004 VanCity Book Prize, received Honorable Mention for the 2004 Vancouver Book Award and was a 2004 One Book, One Vancouver runner-up.

How Sleep Found Tabitha was nominated for the 2003 Christie Harris Illustrated Children's Literature Prize

Chance and the Butterfly was nominated for four awards in 2002: the Silver Birch Award; the Chocolate Lily Award; the Diamond Willow Award; and the Sheila A. Egoff Children's Literature Prize.

== Selected works ==
- Rabbit Ears ISBN 978-1443416627 HarperCollins
- Big City Bees ISBN 978-1-55365-906-8 Greystone Books
- Hunger Journeys ISBN 978-1-55468-579-0 HarperCollins
- Somebody's Girl ISBN 978-1-55469-383-2 Orca Books
- Chance and the Butterfly ISBN 978-1-55469-865-3 Orca Books
- Fraser Bear: A Cub's Life ISBN 978-1-55365-521-3 Greystone Books
- Tale of a Great White Fish Paperback ISBN 1-55365-303-3 Greystone Books
- Once Upon a Golden Apple ISBN 0-14-054164-0 Penguin Books
- How Sleep Found Tabitha ISBN 1-55143-193-9 Orca Books
- Missing Sarah: A Memoir of Loss ISBN 978-0-14-317044-0 Penguin Books
