= Sue Ann Alderson =

American children's novelist

- Born: September 11, 1940 (age 84); New York City
- Occupation: Writer; professor of creative writing
- Education: Ohio State B.A. English; UC Berkeley M.A. English Lit.
- Genre: children's literature

Sue Ann Alderson (born September 11, 1940 in New York City), is an American children's novelist. She earned a Bachelor of Arts degree in English from Ohio State University in 1962 and a Master of Arts in English literature from the University of California, Berkeley in 1967. Alderson moved to Vancouver, British Columbia in 1967, where she taught at Simon Fraser University. She also was a professor in the Creative Writing Department at the University of British Columbia.

Alderson writes for various ages and in different genres. Some common themes in her writing, however, are "the empowerment of children, the joys of animals and nature, the pleasure of cooperative projects and the value of individuality and imagination."

== Awards and honors ==
Awards for Alderson's writing
Year	Title	Award	Result	Ref.
1991	Chapter One	Sheila A. Egoff Children's Literature Prize	Finalist	
1993	Sure as Strawberries	Sheila A. Egoff Children's Literature Prize	Finalist	
1994	A Ride for Martha	Sheila A. Egoff Children's Literature Prize	Finalist	
1993	Chapter One	Manitoba Young Readers' Choice Award	Nominee	
2008	The Eco Diary of Karin Singer	Norma Fleck Award for Canadian Children's Non-Fiction	Finalist	

== Publications ==
A children's novelist, she has written 17 novels. Her most popular books is Ida and the Wool smugglers; according to WorldCat, the book is held in 543 libraries.

- 1974 Bonnie McSmithers, You're Driving Me Dithers, illustrated by Fiona Garrick
  - translated into French by Fiona Garrick as Anne-Marie Maginol, tu me rends folle
- 1977 The Finding Princess
- 1977 The Adventures of Prince Paul
- 1977 Hurry Up, Bonnie, illustrated by Fiona Garrick
- 1979 Bonnie McSmithers Is At It Again, illustrated by Fiona Garrick
- 1983 The Not Impossible Summer
- 1983 Comet's Tale
- 1984 The Something in Thurlo Darby's House
- 1987 Ida and the Wool Smugglers, illustrated by Ann Blades
- 1989 Maybe You Had to be There, by Duncan
- 1990 Chapter One
- 1992 Sure as Strawberries, illustrated by Karen Reczuch
- 1993 A Ride for Martha
- 1995 Ten Mondays for Lots of Boxes, illustrated by Caddie T'Kenye
- 1998 Pond Seasons, illustrated by Ann Blades
- 1999 Wherever Bears Be, illustrated by Arden Johnson
- 2007 The Eco Diary of Karin Singer, illustrated by Millie Ballance
