= James Heneghan =

Canadian author (1930–2021)

- Born: 7 October 1930
- Died: 23 April 2021 (aged 90)
- Education: Simon Fraser University
- Occupation: Author
- Writing career
- Genres: Children's literature, young adult fiction

James Heneghan (7 October 1930 – 23 April 2021), who has also written under the joint pseudonym B. J. Bond, was a British-Canadian author of children's and young adult novels.

== Biography ==
Heneghan was born 7 October 1930 in Liverpool to John and Ann (née Fitzgerald) Heneghan. He immigrated to Canada in 1957 and became a naturalized citizen in 1963.

Heneghan received a Bachelor of Arts degree from Simon Fraser University in 1971. He worked as a police officer in Liverpool as a fingerprint specialist for twelve years before teaching English at Burnaby High School in Burnaby for twenty years.

Heneghan had four children: Ann, Robert, John, and Leah.

He died 23 April 2021 in Vancouver.

== Awards and honours ==
The Grave is a Junior Library Guild book.

Awards for Heneghan's writing
Year	Title	Award	Result	Ref.
1993	Drifting Snow	Governor General's Award for English-Language Children's Literature	Finalist	
1995	Torn Away	Arthur Ellis Award for Best Juvenile or Young Adult Crime Book	Winner	
1995	Torn Away	Sheila A. Egoff Children's Literature Prize	Finalist	
1997	Wish Me Luck	Governor General's Award for English-Language Children's Literature	Finalist	
1998	Wish Me Luck	Sheila A. Egoff Children's Literature Prize	Winner	
2001	The Grave	Sheila A. Egoff Children's Literature Prize	Winner	
2003	Flood	Sheila A. Egoff Children's Literature Prize	Winner	
2004	Flood	Chocolate Lily Young Readers' Choice Award: Chapter Book/Novel	Winner	
2005	Waiting for Sarah	Manitoba Young Readers' Choice Award	Winner	
2007	Safe House	Sheila A. Egoff Children's Literature Prize	Finalist	
2014	A Woman Scorned	Arthur Ellis Award for Best Novella	Shortlist	
2017	Wish Me Luck	Phoenix Award	Winner	
2010	Bank Job	Arthur Ellis Award for Best Juvenile Crime Novel	Nominee	

== Publications ==
- Goodbye, Carleton High (1983)
- Promises to Come (1988)
- Blue (1991)
- Torn Away (1994)
- Wish Me Luck (1997)
- The Grave (2000)
- Flood (2002)
- Hit Squad (2003)
- Waiting for Sarah (2003)
- Nannycatch Chronicles (2005)
- Safe House (2006)
- Payback (2007)
- Bank Job (2009)
- Fit to Kill (2011)

=== O'Brien Detective Agency series ===
- The Case of the Marmalade Cat (1991)
- The Trail of the Chocolate Thief (1993)
- The Mystery of the Gold Ring (1995)
- The Case of the Blue Raccoon (1996)
