= Susin Nielsen =

Canadian writer (born 1964)

- Born: 1964 (age 61–62)
- Occupation: Author
- Spouse: Goran Fernlund
- Children: 1
- Writing career
- Notable work: The Reluctant Journal of Henry K. Larsen
- Notable awards: Governor General's Award for English-language children's literature (2012); Canadian Library Association Book of the Year for Children Award (2013)
- Website: susinnielsen.com

Susin Nielsen (born 1964) is a Canadian author for children, adolescents and young adults. She received the 2012 Governor General's Award for English-language children's literature and the 2013 Canadian Library Association Book of the Year for Children Award for her young adult novel The Reluctant Journal of Henry K. Larsen, which deals with the aftermath of a school shooting.

In 2019, she received the Vicky Metcalf Award for Literature for Young People.

== Personal life ==
Nielsen was born in 1964, and was raised in London and Chatham-Kent, Ontario.

She is married to Goran Fernlund and has one child: Oscar.

== Career ==
Nielsen began her writing career with the Degrassi franchise, writing scripts for the television shows as well as books for the series. Nielsen also played Louella Hawkins the Janitor in Degrassi Junior High. Following her work with Degrassi, Nielsen wrote for many other Canadian television series such as Heartland, What About Mimi?, and Braceface. While working on these shows she produced three children's picture books: Hank and Fergus, Mormor Moves In, and The Magic Beads.

Her first independent novel, Word Nerd, deals with bullying, a theme she returns to in The Reluctant Journal of Henry K. Larsen. Her books often describe the effect of broken families on children.

Nielsen's 2015 book, We Are All Made of Molecules, about two step siblings trying to form a bond with each other, was shortlisted for the Governor General's Award.

Nielsen's 2021 book, Tremendous Things, was nominated for the 2022 Ontario Library Association's Red Maple Award for Fiction.

Nielsen's books have been translated into Dutch, French, Portuguese, Italian, German and Polish (In the Polish language, not all of them have been translated).

== Awards and honors ==
In 2019, Nielsen was honored with the Vicky Metcalf Award for Literature for Young People, which honors writers and illustrators whose body of work has been "inspirational to Canadian youth."

Two of Nielsen's books are Junior Library Guild selections: No Fixed Address (2018) and Tremendous Things (2021).

In 2015, The Globe and Mail, Kirkus Reviews, Quill & Quire, and The Telegraph included We Are All Made of Molecules on their list of the best young adult novels of the year.

Awards for Nielsen's writing
Year	Title	Award	Result	Ref.
2008	Word Nerd	INDIES Award for Juvenile Fiction	Silver	
2010	Word Nerd	Forest of Reading Red Maple Award	Winner	
2010	Word Nerd	Manitoba Young Readers’ Choice Award	Winner	
2010	Dear George Clooney, Please Marry My Mom	INDIES Award for Juvenile Fiction	Winner	
2011	Dear George Clooney, Please Marry My Mom	Sheila A. Egoff Children's Literature Prize	Finalist	
2011	Dear George Clooney, Please Marry My Mom	Snow Willow Award	Winner	
2012	Dear George Clooney, Please Marry My Mom	Manitoba Young Readers’ Choice Award	Winner	
2012	Dear George Clooney, Please Marry My Mom	Rocky Mountain Book Award	Winner	
2012	The Reluctant Journal of Henry K. Larsen	Governor General's Award for English-language children's literature	Winner	
2013	The Reluctant Journal of Henry K. Larsen	Canadian Library Association Book of the Year for Children Award	Winner	
2013	The Reluctant Journal of Henry K. Larsen	Ruth and Sylvia Schwartz Award	Winner	
2013	The Reluctant Journal of Henry K. Larsen	Sheila A. Egoff Children's Literature Prize	Finalist	
2014	The Reluctant Journal of Henry K. Larsen	Forest of Reading Red Maple Award	Winner	
2015	We Are All Made of Molecules	Governor General's Award for English-language children's literature	Finalist	
2016	We Are All Made of Molecules	Carnegie Medal	Longlist	
2016	We Are All Made of Molecules	Ruth and Sylvia Schwartz Award	Winner	
2016	We Are All Made of Molecules	Sheila A. Egoff Children's Literature Prize	Finalist	
2018	Optimists Die First	Carnegie Medal	Nominee	
2018	Optimists Die First	Federation of Children's Book Groups' Children's Book Award	Finalist	
2019	No Fixed Address	IODE Violet Downey Book Award	Winner	
2019	No Fixed Address	Sheila A. Egoff Children's Literature Prize	Winner	
2020	No Fixed Address	Carnegie Medal	Longlist	
2020	No Fixed Address	Forest of Reading Red Maple Award	Winner	
2020	Princess Puffybottom . . . and Darryl	Sheila Barry Best Canadian Picturebook of the Year Award	Shortlist	
2022	Tremendous Things	Carnegie Medal	Nominee	
2022	Tremendous Things	Ruth and Sylvia Schwartz Award	Shortlist	

== Bibliography ==
=== Picture books ===
- The Magic Beads, illustrated by Geneviève Côté (2007)
- Princess Puffybottom . . . and Darryl, illustrated by Olivia Chin Mueller (2019)
- All Cats Welcome, illustrated by Vivian Mineker (2022)

=== Middle grade and young adult books ===
- Mormor Moves In (2004)
- Hank and Fergus (2005)
- Word Nerd (2008)
- Dear George Clooney: Please Marry My Mom (2010) – also published as My Messed-Up Life
- The Reluctant Journal of Henry K. Larsen (2012)
- We Are All Made of Molecules (2015)
- Optimists Die First (2017)
- No Fixed Address (2018)
- Tremendous Things (2021)
- Snap (2025)
