= Carrie Mac =

Canadian author (born 1975)

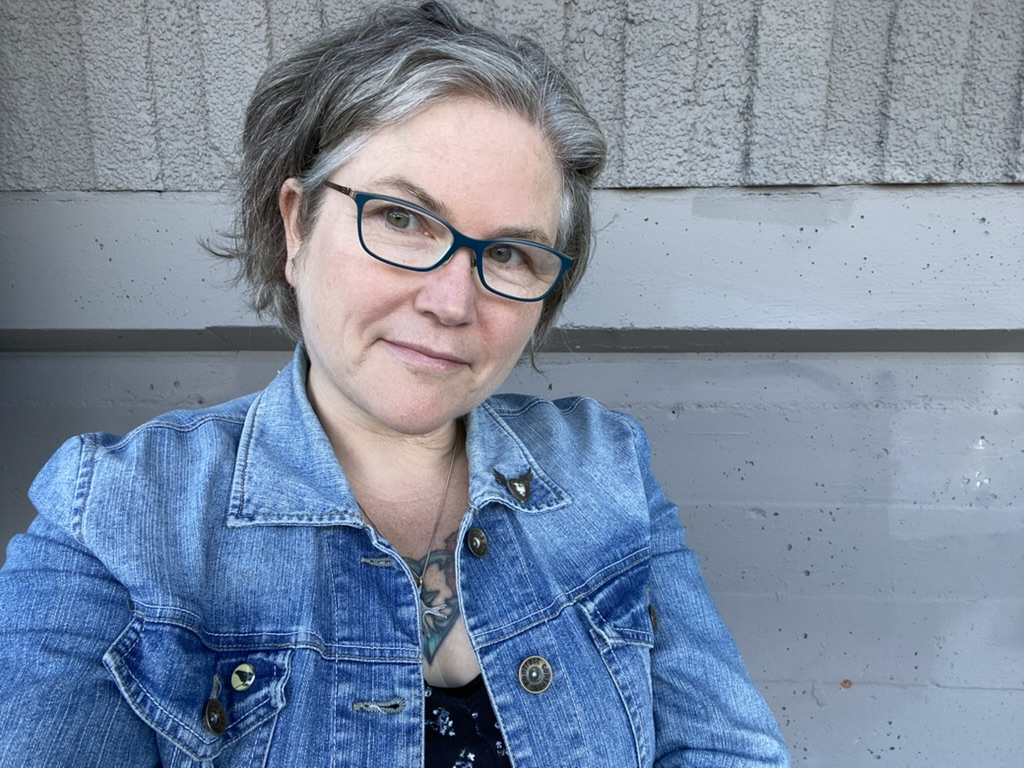
- Mac in 2025
- Born: February 25, 1975 (age 51) Kamloops, British Columbia
- Occupation: Author
- Subject: LGBTQ literature
- Notable works: Last Winter

Carrie Mac (born February 25, 1975) is a writer, most notable for her literary novel, Last Winter. Her short stories and creative non-fiction have been published in numerous publications, such as Prism, Room, New Quarterly, Geist, and Hippocampus. She is also the author of more than a dozen novels for young adults, both contemporary and speculative. Some of her accolades include a CBC Literary Prize, the Sheila A. Egoff Children's Literature Prize, and the Arthur Ellis Award, as well as various other awards and recognitions.

== Early life, education, and employment ==
Mac was born in Kamloops, British Columbia. During her childhood and youth, Mac lived in Vancouver, Grand Forks, Abbotsford and on the Sunshine Coast.

Mac's first job, at age seven, was to read the Bible to an ex-Son of Freedom; she was paid a quarter a page. Mac dropped out of high school in Grade eleven, completing her secondary education by correspondence. She trained as a paramedic at the Justice Institute of British Columbia. Mac also worked at various times as a sign language interpreter, a bookstore clerk, and a child and youth advocate in a transition house.

She has mentored at SFU’s Writer’s Studio, taught at Douglas College, and at UBC’s School of Writing, from which she holds an MFA. She currently mentors emerging writers with their novel manuscripts at Humber College's School for Writers.

== Influences ==
Mac credits Louise Fitzhugh, author of Harriet the Spy, with the realization of "what kind of power words carry, and how they can be used to sharpen your own identity and injure others." Other influences include Anne Cameron and Alice Munro. Mac explains that Raymond Carver showed her that "the lives of working class people (my people) are filled with stories worth writing about too, and that you don't need to go on and on and on and on to relate human emotions when you can nail it down so adroitly with less."

== Writing for reluctant readers ==
Pain and Wastings, The Way Back, Jacked, Charmed, and Crush were written for Orca Book Publishers for the Soundings Series. The Soundings series is written specifically for reluctant or difficult to engage readers, also known as hi-lo readers (high interest, low reading level). It features contemporary themes, often including what might be considered controversial material and language.

== Portrayal of queer characters ==
All of Mac's young adult novels have queer, gay or questioning characters. She says of her work "I know for myself that I can't leave queer characters out of my writing." Her novel 10 Things I Can See From Here (which features a queer protagonist) is often found on banned book lists, such as in the state of Florida in 2023.

== Critical reception ==
Quill and Quire describe Mac as a "powerhouse" and her novel The Opposite of Tidy as "irresistible and not to be missed." C.J. Bott, in VOYA, said of The Beckoners, "The powerful intensity in this book will either keep the reader riveted or forced to take breaks from the haunting discomfort."

"Mac's experience as a paramedic gives her portrayal of their work an easy authority, and she sketches Ethan and his group home with a certain amount of precision and humour. The fluidity of the storytelling, as well as the dramatic circumstances of the story, are likely to attract Orca Soundings readers."

Mac's book Charmed, about a girl who is trapped into prostitution, was banned by the Plano Independent School District in Texas, in 2006/2007. The book "was challenged due to profanity, sexual content and violence." However, according to Dave Jenkinson, Professor Emeritus, Faculty of Education, the University of Manitoba, "Mac's authentic treatment of her subject matter carries through to the book's conclusion… Charmed is the gold standard of what hi-lo titles can be. Highly Recommended."

== Personal life ==
Mac lives in East Vancouver. She is a queer parent to two homeschooled teenagers.

== Books ==
- Last Winter (Random House, 2023)
- Zombie Apocalypse Club (Knopf, 2023)
- Wildfire (Knopf, 2020)
- 10 Things I Can See From Here (Knopf, 2017)
- The Opposite of Tidy (Penguin, 2011)
- The Gryphon Project (Penguin, 2010)
- Triskelia trilogy:
  - The Droughtlanders (Penguin, 2006)
  - Retribution (Penguin, 2007)
  - Storm (Penguin, 2008)
- The Beckoners (Orca, 2004)
- Orca Soundings:
  - Charmed (2004)
  - Crush (2006)
  - Pain and Wastings (2008)
  - Jacked (2009)
  - The Way Back (2014)

== Awards ==
- Canadian Council for the Arts grants (2000, 2003, 2004 & 2008)
- Arthur Ellis Award: Best Young Adult Crime Book (2005)
- Canadian Library Association Honour Book (2005)
- International Children's and Youth Literature White Raven list (2005) for The Beckoners
- International Reading Association Young Adult Choices list (2006) for The Beckoners
- Young Adult Canadian Book Award Honour Book (2007) for The Droughtlanders
- Sunburst Award shortlist in young-adult category (2007) for The Beckoners and (2008) for Retribution
- Stellar Book Award nomination (2009) for The Droughtlanders
- Sheila A. Egoff Book Prize (2010) for The Gryphon Project
- Canadian Library Association Young-Adult Honor Book selection (2010) for The Gryphon Project
- CBC Non-fiction Literary Prize (2015)
