= Polly Horvath =

American-Canadian author

- Born: 30 January 1957 (age 69); Kalamazoo, Michigan, U.S.
- Occupation: Author
- Spouse: Arnold Keller
- Children: 2
- Writing career
- Notable works: Everything on a Waffle; The Canning Season
- Notable awards: Sheila A. Egoff Children's Literature Prize (2002, 2008, 2009); National Book Award for Young People's Literature (2003); Vicky Metcalf Award for Literature for Young People (2010); TD Canadian Children's Literature Award (2013)

Polly Horvath (born January 30, 1957 in Kalamazoo, Michigan) is an American-Canadian author of novels for children and young adults. She won the 2003 U.S. National Book Award for Young People's Literature for The Canning Season, published by Farrar, Straus and Giroux. In 2010, Horvath received the Vicky Metcalf Award for Literature for Young People.

== Biography ==
Horvath was born 30 January 1957 in Kalamazoo, Michigan to John Anthony and Betty Ann Horvath. Horvath began writing at the age of eight.

She attended the Canadian College of Dance in Toronto and the Martha Graham School of Contemporary Dance in New York City. She lived in New York City and Montreal before settling on southern Vancouver Island in British Columbia.

Horvath once declared, "I don't have that much fun writing them. I have the most fun when I'm on the last page."

She is married to Arnold Keller, a professor, with whom she has two daughters: Emily Willa and Rebecca Avery Keller.

== Awards and honors ==
In 2010, Horvath received the Vicky Metcalf Award for Literature for Young People, which is considered a top honour for Canadian children's book writers and illustrators.

Six of Horvath's books are Junior Library Guild selections: My One Hundred Adventures (2009), Northward to the Moon (2010), One Year in Coal Harbor (2013), The Night Garden (2017), Very Rich (2018), and Pine Island Home (2020).

Her books have also landed on many lists of the best books of the year:

- In 1999, The Horn Book Magazine named The Trolls one of the best children's fiction books of the year.
- In 2003, Horn Book Magazine named The Canning Season one of the best children's fiction books of the year.
- In 2004, Horn Book Magazine named The Pepins and Their Problems one of the best children's fiction books of the year.
- In 2008, Booklist and School Library Journal named My One Hundred Adventures one of the best children's books of the year.
- In 2013, School Library Journal named One Year in Coal Harbor one of the best children's books of the year.

Awards for Horvath's writing
Year	Title	Award	Result	Ref.
1999	The Trolls	ALSC Notable Children's Book	Selection	
1999	The Trolls	Boston Globe–Horn Book Award for Fiction	Honor	
1999	The Trolls	National Book Award for Young People's Literature	Finalist	
2001	Everything on a Waffle	Boston Globe–Horn Book Award for Fiction and Poetry	Honor	
2001	Everything on a Waffle	Mr. Christie's Book Award: English, Ages 8 to 11	Winner	
2002	Everything on a Waffle	ALSC Notable Children's Book	Selection	
2002	Everything on a Waffle	Newbery Medal	Honor	
2002	Everything on a Waffle	Sheila A. Egoff Children's Literature Prize	Winner	
2003	The Canning Season	National Book Award for Young People's Literature	Winner	
2004	The Canning Season	ALA Best Fiction for Young Adults	Selection	
2004	The Canning Season	Amazing Audiobooks for Young Adults	Selection	
2004	The Canning Season	Canadian Library Association Young Adult Book Award	Winner	
2004	The Canning Season	Sheila A. Egoff Children's Literature Prize	Finalist	
2006	The Vacation	Sheila A. Egoff Children's Literature Prize	Finalist	
2007	The Vacation	Chocolate Lily Young Readers’ Choice Award	Winner	
2008	The Corps of the Bare-Boned Plane	Sheila A. Egoff Children's Literature Prize	Winner	
2009	My One Hundred Adventures	Sheila A. Egoff Children's Literature Prize	Winner	
2011	Northward to the Moon	Sheila A. Egoff Children's Literature Prize	Finalist	
2013	One Year in Coal Harbor	Bolen Books Children’s Book Prize	Winner	
2013	One Year in Coal Harbor	TD Canadian Children's Literature Award	Winner	
2019	Very Rich	Sheila A. Egoff Children's Literature Prize	Finalist	

== Publications ==
- An Occasional Cow (1989)
- No More Cornflakes (1990)
- The Happy Yellow Car (1994)
- When the Circus Came to Town (1996)
- The Trolls (1999)
- Everything on a Waffle (2001)
- The Canning Season (2003)
- The Pepins and their Problems (2004)
- The Vacation (2005)
- The Corps of the Bare-Boned Plane (2007)
- My One Hundred Adventures (2008)
- Northward to the Moon (2010)
- Mr. and Mrs. Bunny—Detectives Extraordinaire! (2012)
- One Year in Coal Harbor (2012)
- Lord and Lady Bunny—Almost Royalty! (2014)
