= Sarah Ellis (author) =

Canadian children's writer and librarian (born 1952)

- Born: May 19, 1952 (age 74); Vancouver, British Columbia
- Education: University of British Columbia, BA, 1973; MLS, 1975; Simmons College, MA, 1980
- Occupations: Writer, librarian, teacher
- Writing career
- Genre: Children's literature
- Website: sarahellis.ca

Sarah Ellis (born 19 May 1952 in Vancouver) is a Canadian children's writer and librarian. She has been a librarian in Toronto and Vancouver. She has also written reviews for Quill and Quire. She taught writing at the Vermont College of Fine Arts and is a masthead reviewer for The Horn Book.

Ellis has said that she gets her ideas from "memories, anecdotes people tell me, radio interviews, dreams, newspaper articles, family stories, being curious, observing the world, paying attention." She is a strong advocate for children's literature and she belongs to many different clubs and unions such as the Writers' Union of Canada, the Vancouver Children's Literature Roundtable, Children's Writers and Illustrators and many more.

== Biography ==
Ellis was born 19 May 1952 in Vancouver, British Columbia to Joseph Walter and Ruth Elizabeth Ellis and has two older brothers.

She attended the University of British Columbia where she received her Bachelor of Arts honours in 1973 and a Master of Library Science (MLS) in 1975. After receiving her MLS, Ellis began working as a librarian in Vancouver before attending Simmons College, where she graduated with a Master of Arts degree in children's literature in 1980.

Ellis published her first book, The Baby Project, in 1986.

In 1999, she was a writer-in-residence at Massey College at the University of Toronto.

Ellis retired from library work in 2007 but shortly after began teaching at the Vermont College of Fine Arts. She has also written reviews for Quill and Quire and is a masthead reviewer for The Horn Book.

She is an out lesbian.

== Awards and honours ==
In 1995, Ellis won the Vicky Metcalf Award for Literature for Young People, and in 2013, she received the Lieutenant Governor's Award for Literary Excellence. She has also been nominated for the Astrid Lindgren Memorial Award four times.

In 2012, Ellis was chair of the judges for the Boston Globe–Horn Book Award.

Awards for Ellis's writing
Year	Title	Award	Result	Ref.
1987	The Baby Project	Sheila A. Egoff Children's Literature Prize	Winner	
1990	Next Door Neighbours	Sheila A. Egoff Children's Literature Prize	Finalist	
1991	Pick-Up Sticks	Governor General's Award for English-Language Children's Literature	Winner	
1992	Next Door Neighbours	Manitoba Young Readers' Choice Award	Nominee	
1992	Pick Up Sticks	Sheila A. Egoff Children's Literature Prize	Finalist	
1994	Out of the Blue	Governor General's Award for English-Language Children's Literature	Finalist	
1994	Pick Up Sticks	Manitoba Young Readers' Choice Award	Nominee	
1995	Out of the Blue	Mr. Christie's Book Award: English, Ages 12 and up	Winner	
1995	Out of the Blue	National Chapter of Canada IODE Violet Downey Book Award	Winner	
1997	Back of Beyond	Sheila A. Egoff Children's Literature Prize	Winner	
1997	Out of the Blue	Manitoba Young Readers' Choice Award	Nominee	
2000	The Young Writer's Companion	Norma Fleck Award for Canadian Children's Non-Fiction	Finalist	
2002	Dear Canada: A Prairie as Wide as the Sea	Sheila A. Egoff Children's Literature Prize	Finalist	
2003	Salmon Forest	Science in Society Book Award	Winner	
2003	The Several Lives of Orphan Jack	Governor General's Award for English-Language Children's Literature	Finalist	
2004	The Several Lives of Orphan Jack	Canadian Library Association Book of the Year	Shortlist	
2004	The Several Lives of Orphan Jack	Mr. Christie's Book Award: English, Ages 8–11	Winner	
2004	The Several Lives of Orphan Jack	National Chapter of Canada IODE Violet Downey Book Award	Winner	
2004	The Several Lives of Orphan Jack	Sheila A. Egoff Children's Literature Prize	Finalist	
2007	The Queen's Feet	Christie Harris Illustrated Children's Literature Prize	Finalist	
2007	Odd Man Out	Canadian Library Association Book of the Year	Shortlist	
2007	Odd Man Out	Sheila A. Egoff Children's Literature Prize	Winner	
2007	Odd Man Out	TD Canadian Children's Literature Award	Winner	
2008	Odd Man Out	Manitoba Young Readers' Choice Award	Nominee	
2016	Outside In	Manitoba Young Readers' Choice Award	Nominee	

== Publications ==
=== Middle grade and young adult fiction ===
- The Baby Project (1986)
- Next Door Neighbours (1990)
- Pick Up Sticks (1991)
- Out of the Blue (1994)
- The Several Lives of Orphan Jack, illustrated by Bruno St-Aubin (2003)
- Odd Man Out (2006)
- Outside In (2014)
- Dodger Boy (2018)

=== Picture books ===
- Next Stop!, illustrated by Ruth Ohi (2000)
- The Queen's Feet, illustrated by Dušan Petričić (2006)
- Salmon Forest, with David Suzuki, illustrated by Sheena Lott (2003)
- Waiting for Sophie, illustrated by Carmen Mok (2017)
- As Glenn as Can Be, illustrated by Nancy Vo (2022)

==== Ben series ====
The Ben books are illustrated by Kim LaFave.

- Ben Over Night (2001)
- Big Ben (2001)
- A+ for Big Ben (2015)
- Ben Says Goodbye (2015)
- Ben and the Scaredy-Dog (2018)

=== Short story collections ===
- Back of Beyond: Stories of the Supernatural (1997)

=== Dear Canada Diary books ===
- A Prairie as Wide as the Sea: The Immigrant Diary of Ivy Weatherall (2002)
- A Season for Miracles: Twelve Tales of Christmas (2006)
- Days of Toil and Tears: The Child Labour Diary of Flora Rutherford (2008)
- A Christmas to Remember: Tales of Comfort and Joy (2009)
- That Fatal Night: The Titanic Diary of Dorothy Wilton (2011)

=== Nonfiction books ===
- The Young Writer's Companion, illustrated by Juan Fitzherbert (1999)
- From Reader to Writer: Teaching Writing Through Classic Children's Books (2000)

=== Anthologies edited ===
- Girls' Own: An Anthology of Canadian Fiction for Young Readers (2001)
