= Pick-Up Sticks (novel) =

1991 children's book by Sarah Ellis

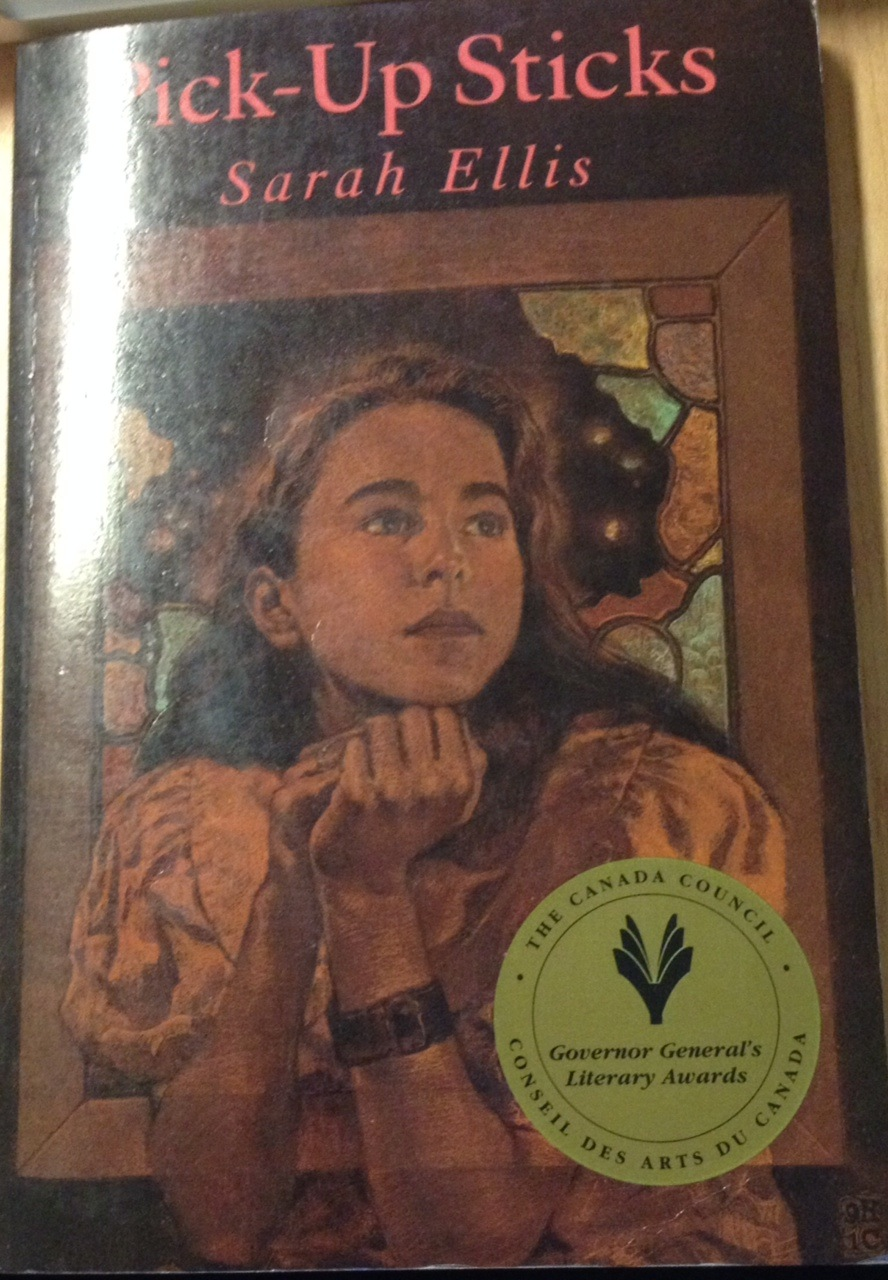
- 1992 first paperback edition
- Author: Sarah Ellis
- Language: English
- Genre: Children's novel
- Publisher: Douglas & McIntyre
- Publication date: 1991
- Publication place: Canada
- Media type: Print
- Pages: 124 pp
- ISBN: 9780888991461
- OCLC: 24215264

Pick-Up Sticks is a children's novel by Canadian author Sarah Ellis. The novel received the 1991 Governor General's Award for Children's Literature. The story is told from the perspective of a thirteen-year-old girl, Polly, as she experiences the struggles of losing her home and her comfortable life. Ellis stated that it was inspired by an interview with a homeless woman who was no longer able to care for her family.

== Plot summary ==
The narrative opens with Polly’s simple life as she moves between school, afterschool volunteering and playing the French horn. The simplicity and perfection of her life is represented by the small, cozy room with a beautiful stained glass window her mother made for her. Apart from her loving relationship with her mother Polly’s friends consist of the downstairs neighbors, Ms. Protheroe, her son Ernie and Polly’s best friend, Vanessa. It is implied that Ernie is cognitively challenged as he spends most of his time watching reruns of Gilligan’s Island and collecting postal codes. Vanessa is portrayed as self-absorbed and a fickle teen, being infatuated with the girls’ English teacher and concocting “hair-brained” schemes as a result.

Polly’s world is shattered when it is revealed that their house is being sold and torn down in two months and her mother fails to find replacement accommodation for the two of them. Catalyzed by the disintegration of her material world Polly comes to question her identity and where she really belongs. First and foremost she asks why her mother choose to bring her up fatherless and begins to strongly desire a father figure in her life. Polly has a fantasy of a father figure sweeping in to make her and her mother’s lives easier. In the process of her identity crisis, Polly’s relationship with her mother dissolves, leading to fights and accusing her mother of being terrible at parenting.

As a result Polly moves in with her Uncle Roger, Auntie Barbie and their daughter Stephanie. Polly finds Uncle Roger to be cold and unsympathetic, especially with regards to the impoverished and her mother. In addition, she finds Auntie Polly to be self-indulgent and vain, filling her life with expensive fitness classes. Finally, her cousin desperately rebels against her parents, participating in shoplifting and vandalizing. When hanging out with her cousin and seeing Stephanie participate in shopping and vandalizing leads her to jump out of the car and desperately run to see her mother at the warehouse where her mother worked. Polly begins to talk to her mother at this point and finds out more about her history with why her mother choose to have her, and that her mother had finally found a place for them to live. Through these experiences she learns that despite their financial situation she has a mother who loves her and she discovers who she is as a person.

== Themes ==
Finding Oneself: the author states that there is nothing that scares her more than the idea of being homeless and losing a sense of who she is. As Polly loses the security of her home and material possessions, she is forced to find out who she is and grows closer to her mother in the process.

== Setting ==
The story takes place in the suburbs of Vancouver. It also mentions the city of Richmond, which is part of the greater metropolitan area of Vancouver.

== Critical reception ==
Pick-Up Sticks won the Governor General's Awards for Children’s Literature in 1991 and was the School Library Journal's Best Book of the Year.

Some reactions to the book include: “...ordinary people, simple events, big themes. A lovely book." (Toronto Sun); "Ellis deftly presents believable characters and situations, and shows how the spirit of family can be captured in non-traditional relationships." (Edmonton Journal) and "Ellis’s writing is lean and child-centered; her insights are perceptive and have an unmistakable ring of honesty." (The Horn Book Magazine)

Canadian Literature praised it for rejecting any easy solution for Polly's problems, though they found the presentation of wealthy characters relied on stereotypes. Publishers Weekly found Ellis's style to be "quiet" and "nonintrusive" rather than dazzling, but considered this well-suited to a low-key "slight" story.
