= The Canning Season =

2003 young adult novel by Polly Horvath

- Author: Polly Horvath
- Language: English
- Published: 2003 (Farrar, Straus and Giroux)
- Publication place: United States
- Media type: Hardcover
- Pages: 208
- ISBN: 978-0-374-39956-6

The Canning Season is a young adult novel by American-Canadian author Polly Horvath. It was first published in 2003 by Farrar, Straus and Giroux.

== Awards and honors ==
The Horn Book Magazine, Publishers Weekly, Chicago Tribune School Library Journal, and The Washington Post included The Canning Season in their lists of the best children's books of 2003.

It also received starred reviews from Kirkus Reviews and Publishers Weekly.

Awards for The Canning Season
Year	Award	Result	Ref.
2003	National Book Award for Young People's Literature	Winner	
2004	ALA Best Fiction for Young Adults	Selection	
2004	Amazing Audiobooks for Young Adults	Selection	
2004	Canadian Library Association Young Adult Book Award	Winner	
2004	Sheila A. Egoff Children's Literature Prize	Finalist	
