= The Seance (Lawrence novel) =

2008 book by Iain Lawrence

- First edition
- Author: Iain Lawrence
- Cover artist: Jen Shekels
- Language: English
- Genre: Children's Mystery
- Publisher: Random House
- Publication date: July 8, 2008
- Publication place: United States
- Media type: Print (Hardcover)
- Pages: 272
- ISBN: 978-0-385-73375-5

The Seance is a mystery novel by Iain Lawrence, first published in 2008. It is set in America in the 1920s. The main character is thirteen-year-old illusionist Scooter King, who lives with his mother the medium, helping her to host seances and make a small living.

Scooter admires Harry Houdini, a famous magician and escape artist. He cannot wait to see him escape from his deadly Torture Tank.

One night, Scooter stumbles on a dead man in the Torture Tank. Little does he know that the dead man is Herman Day. A few days later, Harry Houdini comes to town.
