= Lillian Boraks-Nemetz =

Polish author

Lillian Boraks-Nemetz is born in Warsaw, Poland, where she survived the Holocaust as a child, escaped the Warsaw Ghetto and lived in Polish villages under a false identity. She has a master's degree in Comparative Literature and teaches Creative Writing at the University of British Columbia's Writing Centre. She is the author of numerous books, including Ghost Children, a collection of poetry, and The Old Brown Suitcase, a young adult novel.

== See also ==
- History of the Jews in Vancouver
