= Barbara Nickel =

Canadian poet (born 1966)

- Born: June 22, 1966 (age 59) Saskatoon, Saskatchewan, Canada
- Occupation: Poet
- Education: Goshen College; University of British Columbia (MFA)
- Notable awards: Pat Lowther Award (1998)

Barbara Kathleen Nickel (born June 22, 1966, in Saskatoon, Saskatchewan) is a Canadian poet.

== Life ==
She was raised in Rosthern, Saskatchewan. She graduated from Goshen College and the University of British Columbia with an M.F.A. She was the poetry editor of Prism International.

She moved to St. John's, Newfoundland and Labrador, then back in British Columbia. She was on a panel at the 2005 Association of Writers & Writing Programs conference.

== Awards ==
- 1995 The Malahat Review Long Poem Prize
- 1996 National Magazine Awards, honourable mention
- 1996 Geoffrey Bilson Award for Historical Fiction for Young Adults, finalist
- 1997 Mr. Christie's Book Award, finalist
- 1998 B.C. Red Cedar Awards, finalist
- 1998 Pat Lowther Award

== Publications ==
- "Onychomychosis", The Walrus
- The Gladys Elegies. Coteau Books. 1997. ISBN 978-1-55050-112-4.
- From the Top of a Grain Elevator. Beach Holme Pub. 1999. ISBN 978-0-88878-397-4.
- Domain: poems. Anansi. 2007. ISBN 978-0-88784-759-2.

=== Young adult fiction ===
- The Secret Wish of Nannerl Mozart. Sumach Press. 1996. ISBN 978-1-894549-08-0.
- Hannah Waters and the Daughter of Johann Sebastian Bach. Penguin Group USA. 2006. ISBN 978-0-14-305079-7.

== Anthologies ==
- Lorna Crozier; Patrick Lane, eds. (January 1, 1995). Breathing Fire: Canada's New Poets. Harbour Publishing. ISBN 978-1-55017-125-9.
- Ann Elizabeth Hostetler, ed. (2003). A cappella: Mennonite voices in poetry. University of Iowa Press. ISBN 978-0-87745-859-3.

=== Criticism ===
- "Jail-Breaks and Re-Creations". Northern Poetry Review. Archived from the original on 2009-03-02.

== Review ==
In Domain, her second collection, B.C. poet and fiction writer Barbara Nickel engages explicitly with the concept of home – specifically, the house she grew up in and the memories it evokes. That focus doesn't mean the poems are narrow in scope. Nickel subtly explores the broader associations of each room (for instance, the section "Master Bedroom" comments on marriage) and searchingly paces the halls of a family history that's filled with heartache (her Russian ancestors' village is described in idyllic terms, until "Revolution burned / that inside out").
