= Lyn Cook (children's author) =

Canadian children's writer (1918–2018)

- Born: 8 May 1918; Weston, Ontario, Canada
- Died: 14 July 2018 (aged 100); Ottawa, Ontario, Canada
- Education: University of Toronto (BA, BLS)
- Occupations: Librarian, writer
- Writing career
- Genre: Children's fiction
- Notable awards: Vicky Metcalf Award for Literature for Young People (1978)

Evelyn Margaret (Lyn) Cook (8 May 1918 – 14 July 2018) was a Canadian children's book writer.

== Early life and education ==
She was born in Weston, now part of the city of Toronto, and attended Etobicoke High School and the University of Toronto. She earned a Bachelor of Arts degree in English in 1940 and a Bachelor of Library Science degree in 1941.

== Career ==
She worked at the Wychwood Park branch of the Toronto Public Library before joining the Royal Canadian Air Force Women's Division in 1942. During her service in World War II, she worked as a meteorological observer at RCAF Station Centralia and RCAF Station Trenton.

In 1946, Cook became the first children's librarian in Sudbury, a mining town in northern Ontario. She also hosted a weekly local radio program, entitled A Doorway in Fairyland, which was picked up by the Canadian Broadcasting Corporation in Toronto and ran for four years. Her first book, The Bells on Finland Street, is set in Sudbury and features a young Finnish-Canadian girl who wants to take figure-skating lessons but is constrained by her family's lack of money. First published in 1950, it was reissued in 2003.

Cook published twenty-three books for children of all ages. Typically, the main character is "a realistic hero/heroine set in an identifiable Canadian setting", in a "plausible narrative of children interacting within a community".

She received the 1978 Vicky Metcalf Award for Children's Literature, awarded annually to a Canadian "author of an exceptional body of work in children's literature".

== Personal life ==
In 1949, Cook married and moved to Scarborough, Ontario. She had two children. She died in Ottawa on 14 July 2018.
