= Thistledown Press =

Publishing business in Saskatchewan, Canada

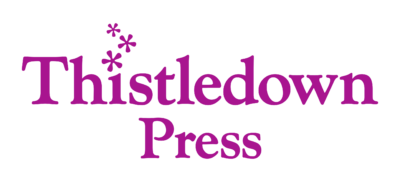
- Founded: 1975; 51 years ago
- Country of origin: Canada
- Headquarters location: Saskatoon, Saskatchewan
- Official website: thistledownpress.com

Thistledown Press is a Canadian independent literary publisher based in Saskatoon, Saskatchewan.
