= Black Chuck (novel) =

2018 book

- Author: Regan McDonell
- Language: English
- Genre: Young adult fiction, Mystery, Thriller, Bildungsroman
- Publisher: Orca Book Publishers
- Publication date: 2018
- Publication place: Canada
- Pages: 304 pp
- ISBN: 1459816323
- OCLC: 992558910

Black Chuck is a young adult Bildungsroman novel by Regan McDonell. It is her debut novel.

== Reception ==
Robert J. Wiersema of the Quill & Quire praised the "well developed and well deserving of empathy while not always likeable" characters and opined that the novel "surprises at nearly every turn; it’s a powerful debut." Chasity Findlay of CM : Canadian Review of Materials called it an "engaging and diverse book that would be a welcomed addition to any classroom or school library." Patricia Jermey of Resource Links wrote: "As these four teens struggle with their demons, we are pulled through their living nightmares by McDonell's harrowing depiction, and hope for their sakes that they can each find their road." School Library Journal wrote "McDonell provides a strong sense of character for each of her players [and] displays an adeptness in handling themes such as loyalty and guilt, making this a read that sticks in the gut." Booklist called it "Superb … a brutal, heartbreaking, and yet strangely uplifting novel about the consequences of lies, the gravity of love, and the courage it takes to prevail over self-condemnation." Kirkus Reviews noted its "Dynamically complex characterization and storytelling…brooding and absorbing."

== Awards ==
- Forest of Reading, White Pine Award, 2019 - Honour Book
- The Sunburst Award for Excellence in Canadian Literature of the Fantastic YA Category, 2019 - Short-listed
- CCBC Best Books for Kids & Teens, 2018 - Commended
- Ontario Library Association (OLA) Best Bets, 2018 - Commended
- Association of Book Publishers of British Columbia’s Canadian Indigenous Books For Schools, 2018-19

== Synopsis ==
When the mangled body of his best friend, Shaun, turns up in a field just east of town, tough-as-hell Réal blames himself. But except for the nightmares, all Ré remembers is beating the living crap out of Shaun the night of his death. Shaun's girlfriend, sixteen-year-old Evie Hawley, keeps her feelings locked up tight. But now she's pregnant, and the father of her baby is dead. And when Réal looks to her to atone for his sins, everything goes sideways. Fast.

The closer Evie and Réal get, the faster things seem to fall apart. And falling in love might just be the card that knocks the whole house down.

== Reception ==
Boston Globe-Horne Book Award winner Andrew Smith described Black Chuck as: “a stunning work of prose—poetic and haunting, tender and gritty—this is a remarkable novel.”
