= John Corr =

Canadian author (born 1977)

John Corr (born November 23, 1977) is a professor at Mohawk College and the author of Eight Times Up, which was published by Orca Book Publishers in 2019.

== Career ==
John Corr is a professor in the Department of Communication and Liberal Studies at Mohawk College and holds a PhD from McMaster University. His post-doctoral research on Irish identity in Canada was funded by the SSHRC and through a TransCanada Post-Doctoral Fellowship. The research was conducted at the TransCanada Institute at the University of Guelph. His academic focus is on rhetoric, technical writing, cultural studies and literary criticism. Corr is the lead author of Essential Communication Skills: Mohawk College, an open-source textbook featuring the FACED problem-solving protocol pioneered by Corr.

In addition to teaching, Corr writes middle grade and young adult fiction. His debut novel, Eight Times Up, was shortlisted at the Hamilton Literary Awards in 2020, and was included in the "Best Bets" category at the Ontario Library Association in 2019. Eight Times Up was also named as a TD Summer Reading Club "Top Ten" Selection (2020) and listed in the Bank Street College of Education's "The Best Books of the Year" (2020).

He is also a member of the Writers' Union of Canada and the Canadian Children's Book Centre.

== Personal life ==
Corr holds the rank of Yondan (4th-degree black belt) with Aikido Yoshinkai Canada, a school that trains in Yoshkinkan Aikido. Aikido is the form of martial arts that is used in Eight Times Up. Corr also coaches youth hockey with the Mount Hamilton Minor Hockey Association.
