= White Pine Award =

Canadian literature award

- Awarded for: Awarded to various outstanding works of Canadian young adult literature (Grades 9 to 12: ages 14 to 18)
- Country: Canada
- Presented by: Ontario Library Association
- First award: 2002
- Website: http://www.accessola.com/ola/bins/content_page.asp?cid=92-263

The White Pine Award is one of the annual literature Forest of Reading awards sponsored by the Ontario Library Association (OLA).

Every year, 10 books are nominated for the award and students vote their favourite book.

The White Pine Nonfiction Award was discontinued after 2014.

== Voting ==
In order to vote for the winner, one must register at the local branch library and read a minimum of 5 of the 10 nominated books. The program ends in April (of that year), with the voting day usually on April 18. Based on student voting across the province, the most popular book is then selected and author is honored with the White Pine Award. There are usually about 10 different nominees for the award every year.

== Winners ==
=== Fiction ===
Award winners
Year	Author	Title	Publisher	Ref.
2002	Shelley Hrdlitschka	Dancing Naked	Orca Book Publishers	
2003	Gillian Chan	A Foreign Field	Kids Can Press	
2004	Don Aker	The First Stone	HarperCollins	
2005	Marnelle Tokio	More Than You Can Chew	Tundra Books	
2006	Charles De Lint	The Blue Girl	Viking	
2007	Eric Walters	Shattered	Viking/Penguin	
2008	Martine Leavitt	Keturah & Lord Death	Red Deer Press	
2009	Cory Doctorow	Little Brother	Tor Books/H. B. Fenn and Company	
2010	Pam Bustin	Mostly Happy	Thistledown Press	
2011	Richard Scarsbrook	The Monkeyface Chronicles	Thistledown Press	
2012	Kelley Armstrong	The Gathering	Random House of Canada/Doubleday Canada	
2013	Jeyn Roberts	Dark Inside	Simon & Schuster	
2014	Lisa Harrington	Live to Tell	Dancing Cat Books	
2015	Eve Silver	Rush	HarperCollins Canada	
2016	Jeyn Roberts	The Bodies We Wear	Knopf Books/Random House Canada	
2017	S. J. Laidlaw	Fifteen Lanes	Tundra Books	
2018	Danielle Younge-Ullman	Everything Beautiful Is Not Ruined	Razorbill Canada	
2019	Heather T. Smith	The Agony of Bun O'Keefe	Penguin Teen Publishing	
2020	Courtney Summers	Sadie	St. Martin's Press	
2021	Tanaz Bhathena	Hunted by the Sky	Farrar Straus and Giroux	
2022	Kate McLaughlin	What Unbreakable Looks Like	Wednesday Books / Macmillan Publishers	
2023	Kate McLaughlin	Daughter	Wednesday Books / Macmillan Publishers	
2024	Kate McLaughlin	Pieces of Me	St. Martin's Press / Macmillan Publishers	
2025	Sarah Suk	The Space Between Here & Now	Quill Tree Books / HarperCollins Canada	
2026	Emily Varga	For She is Wrath	Wednesday Books / Macmillan Publishers	

=== Non-fiction ===
Award winners
Year	Author	Title	Result
2012	Neil Pasricha	The Book of Awesome	Penguin Group U.S.A./Amy Einhorn Books
2014	Lise Dion and Liedewij Hawke	The Secret of the Blue Trunk	Dundurn Press

== See also ==
- Ontario Library Association
- Forest of Reading
- Forest of Reading Red Maple Award
