= The Beauty of the Moment =

2019 novel by Tanaz Bhathena

- First edition
- Publisher: Farrar, Straus and Giroux
- Publication date: February 26, 2019
- Publication place: Canada
- Pages: 368
- ISBN: 9780735263741
- OCLC: 1128822929
- Website: Penguin Random House

The Beauty of the Moment is a 2019 novel written by Tanaz Bhathena. The novel was nominated for the 2020 White Pine Award.

== Plot summary ==
Susan Thomas has emigrated from Jeddah, Saudi Arabia, and has recently moved to Mississauga, Ontario. Susan is passionate about art, but she knows that her parents expect her to pursue a career as a doctor or an engineer and that they would not allow her to attend art school.

== Reception ==
The book has been reviewed by The Globe and Mail, Kirkus Reviews, and Quill & Quire.

== See also ==
- A Girl Like That (novel)
- Hunted by the Sky
