= A Girl Like That =

A Girl Like That may refer to:

- A Girl Like That (film), a 1917 American silent drama film
- A Girl Like That (novel), a 2018 novel by Tanaz Bhathena

== See also ==
- "Girl Like That", a song by Matchbox 20 from Yourself or Someone Like You
