= David Weale =

Canadian writer (born 1942)

David Weale (born 1942) is a Canadian writer and historian from Prince Edward Island. He released his children's Christmas book The True Meaning of Crumbfest in 1999, which won the Ann Connor Brimer Award in 2000 and has been adapted into a television series.

== Biography ==
Weale was born in 1942, and moved to Prince Edward Island in 1948 at the age of five. He has two siblings, a brother and a sister.

Weale released his children's Christmas book The True Meaning of Crumbfest in 1999. The book was the winner of the Ann Connor Brimer Award at the Atlantic Book Awards in 2000. He has written three other children's books: Three Tall Trees in 2004, Doors in the Air in 2012, and Christmas Star Power in 2015.

In 2006, Weale was teaching a course on the history of Christianity at the University of Prince Edward Island when he offered his students a B− grade in exchange for not attending his lectures. Weale stated that he did so because the class was too large and some in attendance were not interested in the material being covered. He was fired by the university one month following the incident, and later filed a grievance claiming that his dismissal was unjust.

Weale is a member of the storytelling group The Four Tellers, which also includes Dennis King, Gary Evans, and Alan Buchanan. The group tells stories about their lives on stage, seated at a kitchen table.

Weale has been an outspoken critic of the purchase of large areas of land by foreigners in Prince Edward Island, particularly by Buddhists associated with the group Bliss and Wisdom. In 2025, he accused the municipal government of Three Rivers of "treachery", claiming that some councillors were "bought and paid for" by the Great Enlightenment Buddhist Society. Three Rivers councillors characterized his claims as "outlandish" and said they were considering legal action against him.

== Publications ==
- Weale, David; Baglole, Harry (1973). The Island and Confederation: The End of an Era. Williams & Crue. ISBN 978-0-9203-0403-7. OCLC 1340051.
- — (1992). Them Times. Charlottetown, PEI: Institute of Island Studies. ISBN 978-0-9190-1315-5. OCLC 25871880.
- — (1994). An Island Christmas Reader. Charlottetown, PEI: Acorn Press. ISBN 978-0-9698-6060-0. OCLC 31292366.
- — (1998). A Long Way from the Road: The Wit and Wisdom of Prince Edward Island. Charlottetown, PEI: Acorn Press. ISBN 978-0-9698-6063-1. OCLC 40300828.
- — (1999). The True Meaning of Crumbfest. Charlottetown, PEI: Acorn Press. ISBN 978-0-9698-6064-8. OCLC 43275679.
- — (2001). Everything That Shines. Charlottetown, PEI: Acorn Press. ISBN 978-0-9698-6068-6. OCLC 47786580.
- — (2003). Overheard on the Island: The Funny, Foolish, and Fantastic Things Islanders Come Out With. Charlottetown, PEI: Tangle Lane. ISBN 978-0-9733-7920-4. OCLC 53036957.
- — (2004). Three Tall Trees. Charlottetown, PEI: Acorn Press. ISBN 978-1-8948-3813-9. OCLC 55973864.
- — (2004). Pride in Small Places: A Photographic Remembrance of Rural Prince Edward Island 1900-1960. Charlottetown, PEI: Tangle Lane. ISBN 978-0-9733-7921-1. OCLC 56319016.
- — (2007). Chasing the Shore: Little Stories About Spirit and Landscape. Charlottetown, PEI: Tangle Lane. ISBN 978-0-9733-7925-9. OCLC 163696961.
- — (2008). Teeth of the Saw: The Island Book of Insults and Cutting Remarks. Charlottetown, PEI: Tangle Lane. ISBN 978-0-9733-7926-6. OCLC 1015606115.
- — (2012). Doors in the Air. Victoria, BC: Orca Book Publishers. ISBN 978-1-5546-9250-7. OCLC 759669202.
- — (2013). Tale Bearer: More Stories From Them Times. Charlottetown, PEI: Tangle Lane. ISBN 978-0-9918-8091-1. OCLC 1015599923.
- — (2015). Christmas Star Power. Charlottetown, PEI: Tangle Lane. ISBN 978-0-9918-8095-9. OCLC 1016874906.
- — (2016). Over by the Car. Charlottetown, PEI: Tangle Lane. ISBN 978-0-9918-8098-0.
- —; Campbell, Loretta (2018). Evelyn: Last of Her Kind. Charlottetown, PEI: Tangle Lane. ISBN 978-1-9886-3002-1.
- — (2020). Poison in the Porridge. Charlottetown, PEI: Tangle Lane. ISBN 978-1-9886-3005-2. OCLC 1260468063.

== Filmography ==
- Eckhart (television series; creator), based on The True Meaning of Crumbfest. Aired from 2000–2002.
- The Islanders (documentary short; narrator), produced by the National Film Board of Canada in 1974. OCLC 897378231
