= Redwing (novel) =

2012 novel by Holly Bennett

- Official cover art of paperback edition
- Author: Holly Bennett
- Cover artist: Juliana Kolesova, Teresa Bubela
- Language: English
- Genre: Fantasy
- Set in: Prosper
- Publisher: Orca Book Publishers
- Publication date: 1 September 2012
- Media type: Paperback
- Pages: 208
- ISBN: 978-1-4598-0038-0
- LC Class: 2012937566

Redwing is a children's fantasy novel by Canadian author Holly Bennett. It is a Library and Archives Canada Cataloguing in Publication, and is recommended for ages 12–18.

== Summary ==
Rowan Redwing is a young button box player whose musician parents and sister died by the plague. Conditions forced him to travel in the winter in a caravan.

Samik's parents are wine traders from Tarzine. After an unfortunate incident with a belligerent warlord, Samik is forced to flee to Prosper with a dog and fiddle.

The two boys encounter each other in a town foreign to both. Rowan allowed Samik, now known as Aydin, to travel with him. Samik claims to be able to see the ghost of Rowan's deceased sister, Ettie. Little did Rowan know that Samik would put him in burning danger...and Ettie and the giant dog would save the day together.

== Awards and achievements ==
- Bank Street College of Education 2013 Best Children's Books of the Year
- CCBC Best Books of 2013
- 2013 SYRCA Snow Willow Nominee

== Reception ==
Redwing has received editorial reviews from Speculating Canada, Best Books of 2012 Magazine (January edition), TriState YA Book Review Committee, CM Magazine, YALSA YA Galley Teen Review, Resource Links, Library Media Connection, and Kirkus Reviews. Speculating Canada described the novel as "fantastic" and compared the narrative to a "haunting lullaby weaving new and old, one place and another, and diverse people together". Best Books of 2012 January Magazine explained that the story is "engaging" with a "fascinating" landscape. TriState YA Book Review Committee wrote that the "suspense ramps up throughout the novel and the climax is compelling", and described the plot as a "great story of friendship and adversity". CM Magazine deemed the book as "highly recommended" and praised that the story "moves quickly", is "wonderfully exciting" with "great characters that the reader will cheer for" and "many tense moments that will keep readers turning the pages to a surprising and satisfying conclusion". YALSA YA Galley Teen Review wrote of Samik and Rowan as "developed, realistic characters". Resource Links described the novel as a "rollicking adventure" with "all kinds of excitement". Library Media Connection also reported the story as "fast-paced", Samik and Rowan as "well-drawn", and the landscape and side characters as "nicely detailed". LMC recommended the "page-turner" for "reluctant and struggling readers". Kirkus Reviews wrote that the story "occasionally ratchets up the suspense by cutting back to the savage men who are trailing Samik", and "suspense rather than action sustains the plot". Kirkus also summarized the novel as "an appealing fantasy with enough tension to firmly hold readers' interest".
