= Eckhart (TV series) =

- Created by: David Weale; Kevin Gillis (series); Gretha Rose (series)
- Developed by: Cheryl Wagner
- Written by: Edward Kay; John Davie
- Directed by: John Laurence Collins
- Narrated by: Bill McFadden
- Countries of origin: Canada; China (Hong Kong)
- Original language: English
- No. of seasons: 3
- No. of episodes: 39

Production
- Executive producers: Kevin Gillis; Gretha Rose; Nancy Chapelle; Steven Ching CW; Lawrie Rotenberg
- Producers: Kevin Gillis; Gretha Rose; David Beatty
- Running time: 22 minutes
- Production companies: Cellar Door Productions; Catalyst Entertainment (Note: As Crumbfest Productions, production services by Phoenix Animation Studios); Animation Services Hong Kong Limited

Original release
- Network: Teletoon
- Release: September 8, 2000 – May 26, 2002

Eckhart is an animated television series based on David Weale's children's book of the same name. The series was co-produced by Cellar Door Productions, Catalyst Entertainment and Animation Services Hong Kong Limited for Teletoon, and aired between 2000-2002. It was created and based on a children's book by David Weale. Approximately, 39 episodes of the program were produced. The pilot ("The True Meaning of Crumbfest") was also a Christmas special on Teletoon in 1998.

== Overview ==
The program incorporates some of the sounds and culture of Weale's home province of Prince Edward Island in Canada. It focuses on Eckhart, the title character, who is a young anthropomorphic mouse, who is the main protagonist of the program.

== Cast ==
- Eckhart – Jessica Pellerin
- Bridgid – Martha MacIsaac
- Boss Mouse – Don Francks
- Tomis – Jack MacAndrew
- Clara / Madam Thel – Marlane O'Brien
- Mavis – Sarah Briand
- Shorty – Don Wright
- Ned / Old Man O'Leary / Mr. Walker ("Lost and Found") – David Moses
- Jasper / Barnaby / Baker Mouse – Nils Ling
- Eleanor / Felicia – Catherine McKinnon
- Sir Roswald / Narrator / Mouse #2 / Tourist Mouse #1 – Bill McFadden
- Sweeney – Mitchell Underhay
- Winnie – Lillie O'Brien
- Laddie - [Jim Smith
- P'tit - Gilles Pellerin
- Caleb / Mr. Walker ("Winnie Gets Sold") / Summerside Mouse / Post Office Mouse - Erskine Smith
- Gus Seagull (season 1) - David Beatty
- Gus Seagull (seasons 2-3) / Junkyard Rat #1 / Police Mouse / Rat / Sewer Rat / Mobster Rat – Scott Ferris
- Marty Seagull / Junkyard Rat #2 / Sammy the Snake / Mouse #1 / Clown / Tourist Mouse #2 – Rob MacDonald
- Mingo - Ben Kinder
- Mr. Walker ("Molly the Mist") - Brad Fremlin
- Mrs. Walker - Joscelynne Bordeaux
- Lance Barns - Chelsea Gaudet
- Molly - Pam Stevenson
- Mr. Town - Ron Ruben
- Mrs. Town - Judi McLaren
- Mina - Brittany Banks
- Otis - Marcella Richards
- Madam Kelly - Laurel Smyth
- Tassie / Esme – Sherri-Lee Darrach
- Nutsy – Katrina Walsh
- Danny / Milton / Reynaldo / Sam the Reporter – Don Burda
- Auntie Yolanda - Maida Rogerson
- Rolo the Ringmaster – Don Harron

== Episodes ==
=== Season 1 (2000) ===
No. overall	No. in season	Title	Original release date
1	1	"The Key"	September 8, 2000
Madame Thel tells Eckhart something about his father. Seeing this, Boss Mouse uses a key to perform some fortunetelling of his own. As Eckhart searches for his future, he is taken by Jasper, a blue jay, who is paid off by Boss Mouse with a "shiny" to abandon Eckhart in an adjacent island. The "shiny" happens to be Thel's stolen crystal ball, which Jasper returns to Eckhart when Eckhart saves Jasper's life. When Eckhart returns, he reveals both Boss Mouse's deceit and the true key to the future.
2	2	"Small Things Make A Difference"	September 17, 2000
The hot summer has dried up the mice's water supply. Eckhart, Bridgid and Mavis follow the dry brook to find out what happened to the water. A frog named Eleanor tells them it was beavers that built a dam. Remembering what Tomis told him, Eckhart dismantles the dam.
3	3	"Mouse Mask"	September 10, 2000
The festival of Mouse Mask is tonight. Boss Mouse is going to scare the mice into handing their crops over to him. After learning about courage, Eckhart discovers the dark plot. Together, Eckhart and Madame Thel thwart Boss Mouse's scheme and scare him off.
4	4	"How Sweet It Is"	October 1, 2000
Eckhart and Bridgid argue about whether maple sweets are real. When Tomis becomes ill after being stuck in a snowstorm, Eckhart must retrieve the maple sweets to heal him. Eckhart ventures into the fields far away from home, he meets Sir Roswald who helps him with his task. With Sir Roswald's help, Eckhart is able to bring the maple sweets home to Tomis. Tomis manages recover from his illness just in time for winter to end and spring to arrive.
5	5	"Came A Stranger"	October 15, 2000
A storm hits the island and causes a shipwreck. In accordance to the Mouse Code, Tomis and Eckhart search the wreck for survivors and find one mouse who only speaks in a French language. Meanwhile, Boss Mouse takes a watch from the wreck, using the shiny back as a crown for himself. The watch belongs to the surviving mouse, given to him by his father and is the only thing he remembers his father by. Realizing this is similar to his own story, Eckhart puts aside his differences with the mouse and works with him to retrieve the watch from Boss Mouse.
6	6	"Hidden Treasures"	October 8, 2000
Eckhart and Bridgid find a treasure map in the barn. Ned and Shorty overhear them and inform Boss Mouse, who orders them to get the treasure before Eckhart and Bridgid do. Eckhart becomes stubborn and refuses to listen to Bridgid's suggestions, allowing Boss Mouse to manipulate Bridgid into working for him. When the tide comes in, Boss Mouse threatens to leave Eckhart to drown, forcing Bridgid to choose between searching for the treasure or rescuing her friend. Bridgid chooses to save Eckhart, and together they learn that their friendship is the greatest treasure.
7	7	"Nose Of The Beholder"	September 24, 2000
On a hot summer day, Eckhart and Bridgid go swimming at the pond while Mavis and Sweeney have a picnic. They meet Sir Roswald and are put off by his smell, as he is a skunk. The foursome try to get rid of Sir Roswald's smell so they can help him make more friends. But when Mavis and Sweeney are hunted by a cat, it is Sir Roswald's smell that saves them from being eaten. Eckhart and Bridgid learn not to be prejudiced against someone at first appearance, changing the way they view Sir Roswald.
8	8	"A Leap Of Faith"	October 22, 2000
Eckhart recovers a wishing star from the river. Eckhart convinces Bridgid the wish making works and shares it with his family and friends. Boss Mouse then gets hold of the wishing star, using it to get inside the house and raid the food. When Eckhart follows to retrieve the wishing star, the cat starts chasing him, and Eckhart starts using faith in himself to evade the cat. The wishing star is revealed to be a diamond, and Eckhart realizes that relying on himself is more important than using the diamond.
9	9	"Eckhart The Brave"	November 12, 2000
Eckhart got scared exploring a cave, thinking he saw a ghost. When he runs out in fear, he is teased for his actions by Ned and Shorty. Eckhart goes to Madame Thel, who tells him retrieve certain items so she can create a charm to bring Eckhart's courage back. But when Eckhart brings the items to Madame Thel, she tells him that he already has his courage by being able to get the items using his ingenuity. Tomis then tells Eckhart that his fear is what stopped him from rushing head-first into danger, and Eckhart realizes there is nothing wrong with him at all.
10	10	"The Big Race"	October 29, 2000
Eckhart and Bridgid enter a race to challenge Boss Mouse, with Sweeney serving as their coach. Sweeney overhears Boss Mouse setting traps against the other racers, but is caught before he can inform Eckhart and Bridgid. The race starts with Sweeney absent, and racers, including Bridgid, are caught in Boss Mouse's traps one after another. Eckhart and Boss Mouse are the only racers left, with Sweeney making it back after being rescued by Jasper. But when Boss Mouse refuses to help Ned and Shorty after they are caught in one of the traps, Eckhart forfeits the race to rescue them, asking Sweeney to take his place instead. Boss Mouse ends up falling into one of his own traps, allowing Sweeney to cross the finish line and becoming the first amputee to ever win the race.
11	11	"Saving Boss Mouse"	November 5, 2000
Eckhart and Bridgid discover a junkyard which they turn into an amusement park for everyone. When Boss Mouse discovers this, he takes it over and charges anyone wanting to enter an excessive fee. Boss Mouse enlists the help of two rats that live in the junkyard to serve as his bodyguards, but they turn on Boss Mouse when he inadvertently insults their intelligence. With Boss Mouse's life in danger, Eckhart decides to save him, despite Eckhart's anger towards Boss Mouse. Eckhart realizes that he cannot let his anger against Boss Mouse or anyone guide his actions, as that means he will be no different than Boss Mouse himself.
12	12	"Hot Air"	November 19, 2000
Eckhart wishes with all his heart that he could find his father and bring him back to the family. Mingo, a charismatic traveler, lands by way of hot air balloon in Crumbfest Cove. In hopes of swindling some food and rest, Mingo explains that he has seen Eckhart’s father in Emerald Junction, and he agrees to take Eckhart on a search, later. Sooner than later, Eckhart ends up in the air without Mingo, navigating the balloon to Emerald Junction. Eckhart masters the balloon, and upon arrival, his father is nowhere to be found. Mingo has lied, but Eckhart realizes that Mingo likes to make up stories because he wishes to sound important and well-known. Wishes can be very powerful, but it is important to remember that there are no guarantees.
13	13	"A Dragon's Tale"	November 26, 2000
Clara has forbidden Eckhart from exploring the shed, concerned about the "dragon" (a truck) there. Egged on by Bridgid to continuing exploring, Eckhart lies to Clara, Tomis, and Mavis about being at the shed. But when the truck drives off with Mavis inside, Eckhart has to mount a rescue without his lies being shown. After nearly getting in trouble with the police because of Ned and Shorty using him as a distraction to shoplift, Eckhart tells the truth about his situation. Luckily, Mavis has been with the police the entire time, and the police choose not to press charges against Eckhart. Eckhart learns that in the end, honesty is the best policy and he should have told the truth.

=== Season 2 (2001) ===
No. overall	No. in season	Title	Original release date
14	1	"Buy Now, Pay Later"	April 6, 2001
Boss Mouse opens a convenience store where he allows customers to shop on credit. Eckhart purchases several items from the store and tries to pay Boss Mouse back over time, using earnings from his job with Madame Thel. But when Madame Thel no longer has work for him, Eckhart misses a payment and Boss Mouse tries to collect the debt. Boss Mouse offers to clear the entire debt for a silver coin that belongs to Eckhart's father. In a dispute at the store between Boss Mouse and two rats who serve as the store's suppliers, the store is lit on fire and Boss Mouse loses everything. Eckhart manages to retrieve the coin and saves Boss Mouse's life, learning that from now on, he must spend within his means.
15	2	"Chip Off The Old Block"	April 8, 2001
Boss Mouse's nephew, Lance, is visiting from the city. Eckhart and Bridgid are immediately wary, believing Lance is as mean as his uncle. They try to chase Lance out by engaging Jasper, only for Jasper to become distracted when he saw a shiny badge on Lance's jacket. The misunderstanding is cleared when Lance tries to save Eckhart from Jasper, making Eckhart and Bridgid realize that Lance is nothing like his uncle.
16	3	"Boxcar Buddies"	April 15, 2001
Eckhart is captivated by the train that passes by his home. Upon hearing Tomis tell him that the train goes all the way to Souris, which Eckhart believes is a mouse town, he sets off accompanied by Bridgid and Sir Roswald. To the two mice's disappointment, Souris isn't a mouse town and, after losing Sir Roswald, they get stranded on a long distance train. With help from Winnie and Jasper, Tomis relocates Sir Roswald and spots the return train that Eckhart and Bridgid are on. Through this journey, Eckhart realizes that the best thing at the end is coming home.
17	4	"Mouse May Fair"	April 22, 2001
At a spring fair, Eckhart and friends meet Barnaby, a performing magician. Eckhart is immediately mesmerized by the act and, with Tomis's agreement, invites Barnaby to his home. When items start disappearing in the community, Eckhart immediately blames Boss Mouse, to the point where Boss Mouse is locked in his own home. But when Barnaby invites Eckhart to be his assistant in his next show, Eckhart finds the missing items in Barnaby's possession. Eckhart then disrupts Barnaby's performance, making him pull out the stolen items in public. Barnaby is chased out of the community, while Boss Mouse is innocent and released from his home.
18	5	"Molly The Mist"	April 29, 2001
On a trip to the beach, Eckhart and Bridgid are caught in a storm. They are swept to sea and Bridgid is stung by a jellyfish, but a mysterious stranger named Molly comes to save them. Molly sends Eckhart into an underwater cave to retrieve kelp for her to make an antidote for Bridgid. Molly returns Eckhart and Bridgid to shore, but when they try to introduce the adult mice to Molly, Molly disappears. The adult mice claim that this is Molly the Mist, a mouse who was swept to sea and drowned a long time ago. Despite this, Eckhart believes he will see Molly again someday.
19	6	"Little Mouse Big City"	May 6, 2001
Boss Mouse's nephew Lance invites Eckhart to visit him in the city. During his stay in Lance's house, Lance shows Eckhart a family heirloom, a cat's tooth, belonging to Lance's great-grandfather. As they tour the city, Lance accidentally drops the tooth into the sewers, prompting Eckhart to jump down to retrieve it. The tooth ends up in the hands of a sewer rat, and after a chase through the sewage waters, the tooth is embedded in the rat's back. Lance offers to pull it out in exchange for the rat returning the tooth, which allows Lance to reclaim the heirloom. Using a trick with the North Star that Tomis taught him, Eckhart is able to guide Lance back home.
20	7	"A Special Gift"	May 13, 2001
For Clara's birthday, Eckhart and Mavis both draw her a picture, but Mavis's drawing is much better than Eckhart's. Eckhart becomes upset that he is not as talented as Mavis in art, which leads him to trying all sorts of things to identify his talent. When Eckhart tries his hands at playing Tomis's fiddle, he finds out that Bridgid plays better than him, and Tomis even invites Bridgid to join in for fiddle lessons. Eckhart ends up hiding Bridgid's fiddle in a fit of jealousy, but the fiddle is destroyed when Eckhart tries to return it. Despite his disappointment at Eckhart, Tomis assures Eckhart that he did not favour Bridgid over him. Tomis ends up creating a new fiddle for Bridgid to play for Clara's birthday, while Eckhart gives a mint leaf as his present to Clara.
21	8	"Foxy Tale"	May 20, 2001
Eckhart pays Sir Roswald a visit, only to find a fox named Felicia in his home. She claims she is a vegetarian and wants to winter in the area, but Sir Roswald will not have any of it. Felicia soon charms the entire community, with everyone turning on Sir Roswald and accusing him of being mean and stubborn. Boss Mouse then banishes Sir Roswald from the community, giving his house to Felicia. But Felicia shows her true colours when she invites the community to her home, only to trap them in and tries to eat everyone. Eckhart escapes and finds Sir Roswald, who chases Felicia out with his smell. Sir Roswald is welcomed back into the community, and Eckhart reaffirms his friendship with him.
22	9	"Freedom For All"	May 27, 2001
Eckhart and Bridgid find a myna in a bird cage, and they intend to set her free. However, after freeing the myna from the cage, Eckhart and Bridgid realize the myna has no idea how to live in the wild. The myna cannot hunt for food, fly smoothly, or identify poisonous berries. When Eckhart and the myna are attacked by a hawk, they realize that the myna doesn't want to live in the wild, preferring to live in the safety of her home. Eckhart realizes that freedom means different things for different creatures, and he shouldn't impose his idea of freedom onto someone else.
23	10	"The Regatta"	September 9, 2001
While playing waterslide on a house's drain pipe, Eckhart and Bridgid find out about a boat race where the winning boat will represent Crumbfest Cove in a larger race. Entrants include Tomis and Eckhart, Bridgid and Sweeney, and Boss Mouse (who asked Ned and Shorty to break a model schooner out of a glass case). Tomis is completely intent on beating Boss Mouse, but asks Eckhart to use too much sail, causing the mast of his boat to collapse. On the other hand, Boss Mouse's ship collides with a sand bar and is also out of the race. Bridgid and Sweeney end up winning, and Tomis apologizes for his behaviour in the race.
24	11	"Happy Juice"	September 30, 2001
Boss Mouse’s latest scheme is a new product called “Happy Juice,” which is guaranteed to hold “happifying powers.” The potion is so popular that he begins to export it to the Mouse Market and the big town of Summerside. But when a water shortage threatens Crumbfest Cove, Eckhart begins to suspect that Happy Juice may not be so happy at all. It turns out that Boss Mouse is draining the stream to create his Happy Juice, leading to a drought in the region. Eckhart sabotages the factory and exposes the Happy Juice source in front of everyone, causing the investor mouse from Summerside to pull out of the project.
25	12	"Burdens Into Blessings"	September 8, 2001
After an incident at the barn, Eckhart is teased for having an oversized tail. Eckhart runs away from home, going to the woods to find something to make himself grow faster. He meets Otis, a forest mouse who has extra large feet for adapting to living in the woods. Otis then shows Eckhart how his long tail is useful when Eckhart saves Ned and Shorty from an owl. Ned and Shorty apologize to Eckhart for making fun of him, and Eckhart promises to visit Otis again. In the end, Eckhart realizes that his tail is a blessing and not a burden.
26	13	"Flight School"	September 23, 2001
Mingo returns to Crumbfest Cove, this time holding a pilot's license and offering the teach the community how to fly a plane. Eckhart, Bridgid, and Shorty (at Boss Mouse's orders) all sign up, while Sweeney attempts his own flight with a kite. Ned and Shorty end up firing a rocket into the air, catching Sweeney on his kite and sending him wayward. With Mingo out of commission with a sprained wrist, Eckhart must fly the plane alone to save Sweeney. For his rescue of Sweeney and being able to land the plane safely, Mingo awards Eckhart with his mouse wings.

=== Season 3 (2002) ===
No. overall	No. in season	Title	Original release date
27	1	"Step Dance"	March 9, 2002
Eckhart and friends take part in a festival with a step dance competition. Eckhart wants to win the competition, as his father was a previous champion. When a mishap with Boss Mouse's audio system causes Eckhart to temporarily lose his hearing, Eckhart becomes worried that he can no longer compete. But Sweeney encourages Eckhart to not worry about hearing the music, instead focusing on feeling the rhythm. Eckhart is able to do so and ends up winning the competition.
28	2	"Winnie Gets Sold"	March 10, 2002
Winnie gets a new companion at her barn, an arrogant horse named Tassie. While Tassie takes over most of the tasks at the barn, Winnie ends up being sold. But Eckhart and friends soon find Tassie difficult to work with, as she refuses to take them to the beach and even befriends the barn cat. Tassie soon gets injured when she attempts to show off her jumping skills, causing her to be sent back. Eckhart then convinces Winnie to return by putting a spur in her foot, causing Winnie's new owners to think she is injured, and then returning her back to Crumbfest Cove.
29	3	"Seed Pool"	March 17, 2002
While practicing for a football game with his squirrel friend Nutsy, Eckhart inadvertently interrupts Boss Mouse's campaign for re-election as keeper of grains, whose job is to collect grains for winter. Given no one in Crumbfest Cove supports Boss Mouse, the public advocates Eckhart to take over instead. Boss Mouse then sabotages Eckhart's efforts to collect grains, including stealing the grains collection when Eckhart forgets to lock the jars. But when Nutsy uses Boss Mouse's own stash of stolen grains to refill the public inventory, Eckhart is vindicated.
30	4	"Jasper's Change of Heart"	March 24, 2002
When Jasper has a flying accident and hits his head, he loses his memory. He is no longer his snarky and obnoxious self, and even loses his interest in shiny objects. On the other hand, Jasper's amnesia has made him kinder and gentler to everyone, doing people favours for nothing in return. Boss Mouse attempts to take advantage of this by asking Jasper to go into the humans' home to fetch him some pies. Jasper is attacked by the cat and hits his head again, this time regaining his previous memories and retaliating against Boss Mouse by dumping soot on him. Eckhart learns that despite Jasper's flaws, the most important thing is to accept a friend for all that he is.
31	5	"Burning Barn"	March 31, 2002
When Ned and Shorty are playing with magnifiers, they accidentally set a fire at the barn. Bridgid and Sweeney lose their home, and Boss Mouse's own residence is also affected. When Boss Mouse finds the magnifiers, he spreads a rumour that Bridgid and Sweeney set the fire, by virtue of them being initially seen with the magnifiers. While Bridgid and Sweeney leave Crumbfest Cove, Eckhart investigates in order to clear their names. Eckhart tricks Ned and Shorty into confessing by claiming the fire has to be set by someone smart. This clears Bridgid and Sweeney, allowing them to come back home.
32	6	"Mighty Mom"	April 7, 2002
Tomis sets up his annual scavenger hunt, and when Eckhart's original partner Lance can't participate, Tomis recommends Eckhart to choose his mother. Eckhart is originally sceptical, especially when Bridgid chooses Sir Roswald, who is an expert at solving riddles and puzzles. But when Boss Mouse cheats, Eckhart ends up relying on Clara, who can be just as strategic and competitive. Not only does Clara solve most of the riddles, she also distracts Boss Mouse long enough to find the final item. Eckhart learns that in the end, he has to keep an open mind, as the people he least expects can help him may end up helping him the most.
33	7	"Ice Floe"	April 14, 2002
While playing in the snow, Mavis and Sweeney wander onto an ice floe, which breaks away and sends them drifting into the ocean. Eckhart and Bridgid immediately launch a rescue, but Mavis and Sweeney meet a friendly seal named Danny. Danny ends up taking Mavis and Sweeney to open ocean, where the higher temperature causes their ice floe to melt. Eckhart and Bridgid also become separated, with Bridgid landing on a separate ice floe while Eckhart continues his rescue. In the end, Tomis, with the help of Jasper, manages to locate Eckhart, Mavis, and Sweeney, who take a ride on a whale in getting back onto land.
34	8	"Ghost Story"	April 21, 2002
Eckhart, Bridgid, and Sweeney are having their first ever sleep out, doing so at the lighthouse. After hearing a ghost story from the seagulls, Bridgid and Sweeney become scared and leave in the middle of the night. Eckhart investigates the lighthouse and finds information about a shipwreck, with only one survivor named Milton. Eckhart discovers that Milton is currently living alone at the lighthouse, but when Eckhart tries to invite Milton to Crumbfest Cove, Milton refuses. It takes the light burning out at the lighthouse and a storm sending a ship for the rocks for Milton to finally change his mind. Eckhart, Milton, and the others repair the lighthouse in time and avert a disaster, and Milton agrees to spend some time with Eckhart.
35	9	"Iron Eckhart"	April 28, 2002
Jasper informs Tomis that he has a package waiting for him at the market. But with the snowstorm making travel difficult, Eckhart offers to pick up the package on Tomis's behalf. Boss Mouse overhears that the package may be something valuable, and immediately tries to intercept Eckhart, using a sled he stole from Nutsy the squirrel. Eckhart and Nutsy give chase and, despite falling into a trap Ned and Shorty set, manage to catch up to Boss Mouse. Eckhart finds out that the package contains a trophy belonging to Tomis's old friend, and learns that the treasure is priceless compared to Tomis's pride at Eckhart completing the same tasks Tomis did years ago.
36	10	"Auntie Arrives"	May 5, 2002
Eckhart's aunt Yolanda comes to Crumbfest Cove for a visit. Eckhart is not used to Aunt Yolanda's mannerisms, especially after she dresses him in unusual clothing and causes him to be teased by Ned and Shorty. Oddly enough, Boss Mouse develops a crush on Yolanda, leaving Eckhart in an awkward situation. But when Eckhart and Bridgid get in trouble with the house cat, it is Yolanda who bails them out. Eckhart finds that Yolanda is a lot different than he expected before, and he looks forward to her next visit to Crumbfest Cove.
37	11	"Lost and Found"	May 12, 2002
Eckhart and Bridgid find a wallet belonging to one of the human residents. Before long, the residents of Crumbfest Cove are interested in the contents, especially the money which they have never seen before. But when Eckhart finds out that the humans may have to sell off their items due to them losing the money, he realizes that the mice have to give the money back. While everyone agrees to return the money, Boss Mouse is the only one to refuse. But when Boss Mouse's home is directly affected, Eckhart has to save Boss Mouse's home from being sold off. The mice manage to return all the missing money and let the humans avoid selling, and Eckhart learns the importance of returning items that do not belong to him.
38	12	"Cirque de Souris"	May 19, 2002
While diving off a tall pipe, Eckhart and Bridgid see a circus being set up in Crumbfest Cove. It is Boss Mouse who invited the circus here, using this as his latest money scheme. Bridgid is recruited by Reynaldo, a trapeze artist, to take part in the act. Eckhart is sceptical, especially when he finds out that Reynaldo's previous partner Esme is injured. He tries to warn Bridgid but is harshly refused, and the ringmaster rudely tells Eckhart to leave. On the night of Bridgid's debut, Reynaldo and the ringmaster pull the safety net, causing Bridgid to nearly fall to her death. Luckily, Eckhart saves her and exposes Boss Mouse, and Bridgid ends her association with the circus.
39	13	"Whale Tale"	May 26, 2002
After a particularly stormy night, Eckhart finds that a whale has beached itself. While Eckhart and Bridgid think of ways to put the whale back into the ocean, Boss Mouse has other plans. Instead of keeping the whale comfortable until high tide, when the whale can swim back out, Boss Mouse wants to turn the whale into a tourist attraction. With Winnie's help, Eckhart gets the humans to the beach, where they can tow the whale back to sea during high tide. Tomis is proud of Eckhart's courage and compassion for another creature, and Eckhart is relieved that the whale has found its family and is now safe in the ocean.

== Telecast and home media ==
The program was broadcast in 25 countries around the world.

The program was packaged for sale as a retail DVD (with 26 episodes plus Christmas Special).

As of 2023, the program is now streaming on The Roku Channel in the U.S. although the program did not air on U.S. linear television.
