= The Lottery (novel) =

2002 novel by Beth Goobie

- Author: Beth Goobie
- Language: English
- Publisher: Orca Book Publishers
- Publication date: October 1, 2002
- Publication place: Canada
- Media type: Print, ebook
- Pages: 262 pages
- ISBN: 1551432382

The Lottery is a 2002 novel by Canadian author Beth Goobie. The book was first published on October 1, 2002, through Orca Book Publishers.

== Characters ==
Sal Hanson The main protagonist.

Shadow Council A school club designed to choose one victim or "lottery winner" who will do their bidding's and be discriminated against throughout that entire year.

Brydan Sally Hanson's best friend, wheelchair user and likes jazz.

Kimmie Sally Hanson's best friend.

Dusty Hanson Sally Hanson's brother.

Willis Cass President of Shadow Council

== Synopsis ==
In The Lottery Beth Goobie tells the deeply disturbing yet timeless story of the scapegoat. The mechanics of the scapegoating procedure in this case are tidily explained in the novel's opening lines: “Every student at Saskatoon Collegiate knew about the lottery. It was always held in the second week of September, during Shadow Council’s first official session. Rumor had it that a coffin containing the name of every S.C. student was placed in front of the blindfolded Shadow president. The lid was lifted, the president dipped a hand among the shifting, whispering papers, and a name was pulled.” Following the draw, the “winner” is shunned for the entire school year. Friendless, isolated, and quickly demoralized, the student becomes a stooge of the Shadow Council, a group that disguises itself as a service organization but is really an intimidation ring.

== Themes ==
The Lottery deals with themes of friendship, romance, disability, high school, bullying in school and peer pressure. Comparisons have been made between the themes and story lines in Shirley Jackson's The Lottery as well as to Brutus's involvement in the murder of Julius Caesar in Shakespeare's play.

== Reception ==
Critical reception has been mixed to positive, with Kliatt giving the book a positive review and marking it as one of their "Editors' choice" for 2003. The Quill and Quire gave a positive review for The Lottery, calling Goobie's style "baroque and edgy". The School Library Journal and Horn Book Guide also reviewed the book, with the School Library Journal praising Goobie's writing while criticizing the "plethora of disparate plot elements". Publishers Weekly also gave a mixed review, stating that at points the book had "heavy-handed symbolism and extraneous detail" but also raised "potentially provocative questions about free choice, self-knowledge and guilt".
