= K. V. Johansen =

Canadian writer

Krista V. Johansen
- Born: 1968 (age 57–58); Kingston, Ontario
- Education: University of Toronto
- Occupation: Author
- Writing career
- Genres: Fantasy, science fiction, Children's literature

Krista V. Johansen (born 1968) is a Canadian fantasy, science fiction, and children's author.

Krista Victoria Johansen was born in Kingston, Ontario. She holds Master's degrees in Medieval Studies and English literature from the University of Toronto.

She lives in Sackville, New Brunswick.

== Bibliography ==
=== Novels ===
- Blackdog (Pyr, 2011)
- The Leopard: Marakand Volume One (Pyr, June 2014)
- The Lady: Marakand Volume Two (Pyr, December 2014)
- Gods of Nabban (Pyr, September 2016)
- The Last Road (Pyr, September 2019)

==== Warlocks of Talverdin (novels) ====
- Nightwalker (2007)
- Treason in Eswy (2008)
- Warden of Greyrock (2009)
- The Shadow Road (2010)

==== Torrie Quests (novels) ====
- Torrie and the Dragon (1997)
- Torrie and the Pirate-Queen (2005) (in Danish as Sørøverdronningen, 2005; in Macedonian as Тори и пиратската кралица)
- Torrie and the Firebird (2006)
- Torrie and the Snake-Prince (2007) (in Macedonian as Тори и принцот-змија)
- Torrie and the Dragonslayers (2009)

==== Cassandra Virus (novels) ====
- The Cassandra Virus (2006)
- The Drone War (2007)
- The Black Box (2011)

==== Pippin (picture books) ====
- Pippin Takes a Bath (1999) (in French as Au bain, coquine!, 1999)
- Pippin and the Bones (2000) (in French as Coquine et son trésor, 2000)
- Pippin and Pudding (2001) (in French as Coquine et Pouding, 2001)

=== Collections ===
- The Serpent Bride and Other Stories from Medieval Danish Ballads (1998)
- The Storyteller and other Tales (2008)

=== Non-fiction ===
- Highlights in the History of Children's Fantasy (2004)
- Quests and Kingdoms: A Grown-Up's Guide to Children's Fantasy Literature (2005)
- Beyond Window Dressing? Canadian Children's Fantasy at the Millennium (2007)

== Awards and honours ==
- 2000 — Early Childhood Literacy Award from the Lieutenant-Governor of New Brunswick
- 2004 — Frances E. Russell Award for research in children's literature from the Canadian section of the International Board on Books for Young People.
- 2006 — Lilla Stirling Award, for the novel Torrie and the Pirate-Queen, awarded by the Canadian Authors Association.
- 2006 — Torrie and the Pirate-Queen was a starred selection in the Our Choice Guide to Canada's Best Children's Books from the Canadian Children's Book Centre
- 2007 — Ontario Library Association Best Bets Top Ten List for 2006 for Torrie and the Firebird
- 2007 — Voya's Best Science Fiction, Fantasy, & Horror 2006 List for Nightwalker
- 2007 — The Cassandra Virus short-listed for the 2007 Book of the Year for Children Award by the Canadian Library Association
- 2007 — Torrie and the Snake-Prince short-listed for the 2008 Silver Birch Award.
- 2008 — Torrie and the Snake-Prince was on the 2007 Year's Best list from Resource Links magazine
- 2008 — Ontario Library Association Best Bets Top Ten List for 2007 for Nightwalker
- 2008 — Nightwalker short-listed for the 2008 Snow Willow Awards
- 2008 — Torrie and the Snake-Prince selected for the 2008/2009 Hackmatack Children's Choice Book Award short-list
- 2008 — Nightwalker won the 2008 Ann Connor Brimer Award
- 2010 — Warden of Greyrock selected for the 2009 Ontario Library Association Best Bets Top Ten List
- 2010 — Johansen receives the 2010 Anna Frank Award for Children's Literature in Macedonia.
- 2011 — Torrie & the Snake-Prince was chosen by IBBY (the International Board on Books for Young People) for their 2011 selection of Outstanding Books for Young People with Disabilities
- 2012 — Ontario Library Association Best Bets for 2011 honourable mention for The Black Box
- 2012 — Blackdog short-listed for the 2012 Sunburst Award
