= Camp X (novel) =

2002 book by Eric Walters

- The front cover of Camp X
- Author: Eric Walters
- Illustrator: John Mantha
- Cover artist: Lisa Jager
- Language: English
- Series: Camp X
- Genre: Spy fiction, Historical Fiction
- Publisher: Penguin Canada
- Publication date: 2002
- Publication place: Canada
- Media type: Print (Paperback)
- Pages: 229 pp
- ISBN: 0-670-91101-1
- OCLC: 47948477
- Followed by: Camp 30 (novel)

Camp X is a children's spy novel written by Canadian author Eric Walters. Set in World War II, the novel is about the two brothers Jack and George, trying to save a top-secret Canadian military base called Camp X. They accidentally discovered it after playing a fake game of war.

Camp X was first published in 2002 and was followed by several sequels such as Camp 30, Fool's Gold, Shell Shocked and Trouble in Paradise. The book is dedicated to the memory of William Stephenson, who established the spy camp. He appears in the novel as Little Bill.

== Plot summary ==
It is wartime, and nearly-12-year-old George and his 14-year-old brother Jack had moved with their mother to Whitby, Ontario from their farm in the summer of 1943. Their father was off fighting Germany in Africa and Jack and George's mom works for a munitions factory. Their summer was plain. But then, one day, after playing make-believe war they stumbled into a military base. There, their curiosity leads them to the discovery of Canada's Top Secret Military Base for training spies, Camp X. After sneaking around, they are caught by the guards and were forced to sign the Official Secrets Act. They learn much about the camp and are sent off with tasks improving the security. When delivering newspapers one day for Mr. Krum, Mr. Krum kidnaps the brothers for information about the camp. Jack and George are tortured and almost killed, but they learn about the plan to invade Camp X. They get away and warn the Camp X of the attacks that are planned. They risk their lives to warn Camp X.

== Characters ==
=== Main characters ===
Jack: Jack Braun is a 14-year-old boy. He is the older brother of George. He teases and bosses his little brother George around but is still very friendly to him. For a 14 year old, he is tough, and would want to join the army like his dad in Africa fighting the Germans. He and George have been in many difficult situations, but Jack managed to get them out with his quick thinking. Their grandfather is German, but they are both Canadian.

George: George Braun is 11 and is turning 12 in 2 weeks. He is the younger brother of Jack and gets in fights with him a lot, especially when he teases him, although George loses almost every argument they have. Unlike Jack, George isn't as tough and has to rely on Jack to defend him. But at the end of the book, George eventually proves to be just as tough.

Bill: Bill is the Chief of Security for Camp X. He is responsible for training the spies at Camp X and improving the security. His favorite way of improving the security is with Mr. Granger, who works at the D.I.L. plant. Each week, they take turns trying to get in each other's security and the winner gets a box of cigars.

Lieutenant Colonel: The Lieutenant Colonel is the commanding officer of Camp X, he is the first official to question Jack and George when they are apprehended on the base. He is also the one who asked Jack and George to sign the Official Secrets Act.

Mr.Krum: Mr. Krum (full name-Rainer Krum) is a Nazi spy disguised as a newspaper editor. He was born in Germany and fought for them in [World War I]. He tries to calm the brothers' suspicions by saying that he fought for his country in that war, and that he would never fight for Hitler. Yet, the truth is he was sent to Canada as a spy. He used his paper boys Jack and George to get him information about Camp X, and later betrayed them to other Nazi spies.

=== Minor characters ===
Chief Smith: Chief Smith's real name is Schmidt, but he prefers Smith because he doesn't want people to be suspicious of him for having a German last name. He is the chief of police in Whitby, and one of the few people who knew about the boys involvement in Camp X

Little Bill: Bill was named after William Stephenson. In the book, he was the head of all spy camps in Canada, making him one of the most important and busiest people in Canada. He did not appear very much in Camp 30.

== Winner ==
In 2003, the book Camp X won the Silver Birch fiction award in the Forest of Reading program.

== Reception ==
Bridget Donald's review in Quill & Quire, Canada's magazine of book news and reviews, describes Camp X as an absorbing read and a page-turner, saying that this rather than the historical background is its strength. She notes that the novel does not glorify war though treating the Allied Forces as heroes. In the Edmonton Journal the novel is described as having "the right elements to keep young espionage fans turning the pages", and the Georgia Straight says that the author is his usual thrilling self.
