= George Stroumboulopoulos =

Canadian broadcaster

George Stroumboulopoulos CM
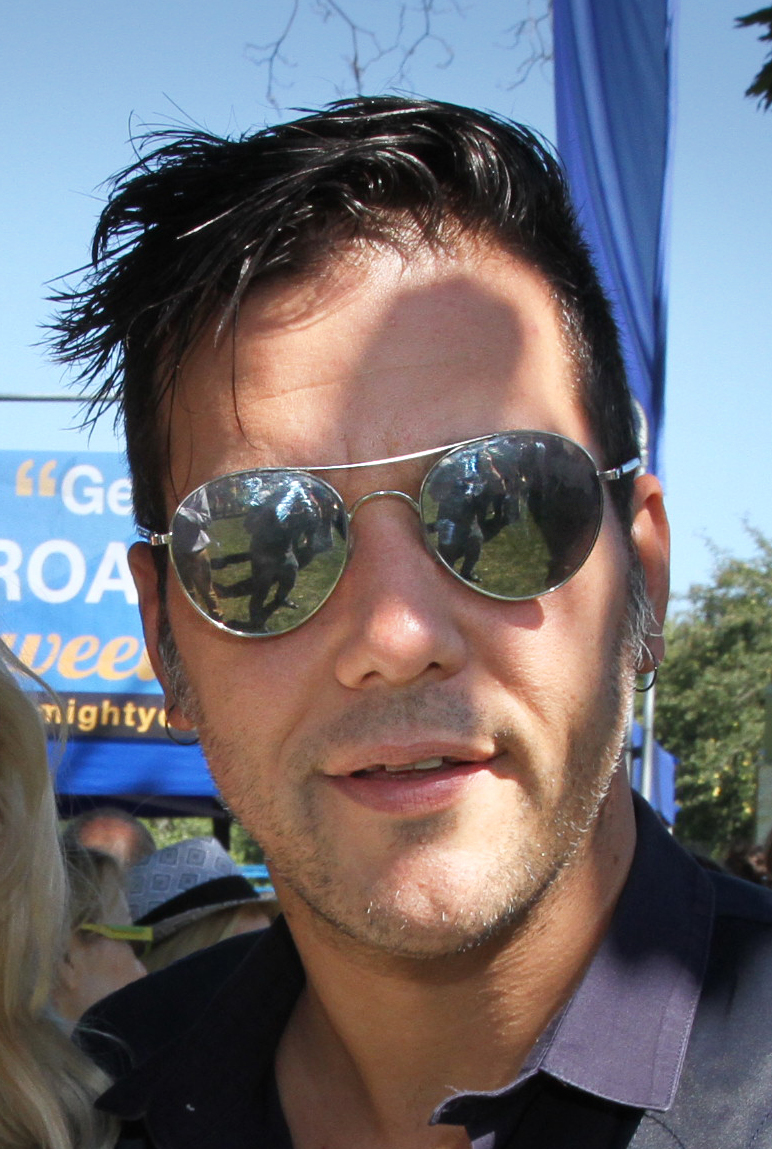
- George Stroumboulopoulos at the 2014 CFC Annual BBQ
- Born: George Mark Paul Stroumboulopoulos; 16 August 1972 (age 54); Malton, Ontario, Canada
- Other name: Strombo
- Education: Ascension of Our Lord Secondary School
- Alma mater: Humber College
- Website: future.strombo.com

George Mark Paul Stroumboulopoulos CM (/ˌstrɒmbəˈlɒpələs/, born 16 August 1972) is a Canadian media personality, television host and podcaster. He is one of Canada's most popular broadcasters and best known as formerly being a VJ for the Canadian music television channel MuchMusic. He was also the host and co-executive producer of the CBC Television talk show George Stroumboulopoulos Tonight (formerly The Hour) from 2005 to 2014. From 2014 to 2016, Stroumboulopoulos worked for Rogers Media, anchoring Hockey Night in Canada and the NHL on Rogers. From 2009 to 2023, he was a radio host on CBC Music. In 2020, he joined Apple Music Radio as host of a Monday to Thursday live show.

== Early life ==
Stroumboulopoulos was born 16 August 1972, in Malton, Ontario, a neighbourhood in Mississauga, Ontario, to a Greek father from Egypt and a Ukrainian mother. He was raised in Toronto, primarily by his mother and a close-knit extended family. After graduating from Ascension of Our Lord Secondary School, he graduated from the Radio Broadcasting program at Toronto's Humber College in 1993.

== Career ==
=== Radio ===
In spring 1993, Stroumboulopoulos worked at rock radio station CKLZ 104.7FM The Lizard in Kelowna, British Columbia for a few months before getting a job offer at the Toronto radio station CJCL, working in talk radio. He then moved to CFNY-FM to host various shows including Live in Toronto.

=== MuchMusic ===
From 2000 to 2004, Stroumboulopoulos worked at MuchMusic as producer and host of The Punk Show, then host of The NewMusic, MuchLOUD and MuchNews.

=== The Greatest Canadian ===
In 2004, Stroumboulopoulos was featured on CBC television's The Greatest Canadian series as the advocate for Tommy Douglas, former Saskatchewan premier and regarded as Canada's "Father of Medicare". More than 1.2 million votes were cast over six weeks, as each of 10 advocates made their case for the top 10 nominees. George made a personal and passionate case for Tommy Douglas, who was named the winner of the contest.

=== The Strombo Show ===
Stroumboulopoulos hosted a long-running Sunday night talk radio show, The Strombo Show. Originally aired as a talk show on CFRB in Toronto and CJAD in Montreal, the show moved to the Corus network in November 2007 and the format changed to one of mainly music. The Strombo Show broadcast from 102.1 The Edge's Toronto studio and on other radio stations in the Corus Entertainment network, including CFOX-FM in Vancouver, Power 97 in Winnipeg, FM96 in London and Y108 in Hamilton.

The show moved to CBC Radio 2 on November 8, 2009, and continued as a music-oriented freeform radio talk show until 2023.

=== George Stroumboulopoulos Tonight/The Hour ===
On January 17, 2005, the first episode of The Hour went to air. In the show's seventh season, in 2010, the show's name changed to George Stroumboulopoulos Tonight, and it was shortened from one hour to half an hour. George Stroumboulopoulos Tonight was a hybrid of news and celebrity and covered everything from politics, pop culture, the environment, human rights, entertainment, sports and more. It won eight Gemini Awards. There are a range of guests on the show from world leaders to celebrities and politicians. The show concluded at the end of the 2013–2014 season as Stroumboulopoulos moved to Rogers Communications.

=== The One: Making a Music Star ===
In July 2006, Stroumboulopoulos hosted the American reality television talent show, The One: Making a Music Star that aired on ABC in the United States, and CBC Television in Canada. It was advertised as a similar show to American Idol and Rock Star but with the twist that contestants would "live together in a fully functioning music academy", with their actions documented similar to the Big Brother format.

The show was reportedly the most expensive summer series in the history of the ABC network. Its first episode, on July 18, 2006, scored a low audience of 3.08 million viewers, and subsequent episodes had even fewer viewers. The series was cancelled after just two weeks (four episodes) with the final results undecided on July 27, 2006, with no plans for any further episodes.

=== Stroumboulopoulos on CNN ===
Stroumboulopoulos' hour-long talk series for CNN, Stroumboulopoulos, aired during the late spring and the summer of 2013. It was taped before a live audience in Los Angeles, and featured interviews in a format similar to his CBC show. Sometimes, episodes did not air as scheduled. After airing seven episodes from June 14, 2013, to August 16, 2013, CNN did not renew the show.

=== Hockey Night in Canada and move to Rogers ===
On March 10, 2014, Rogers Media, which had acquired exclusive national media rights to the National Hockey League, officially announced that Stroumboulopoulos would serve as the main host of Hockey Night in Canada, beginning in October 2014, replacing Ron MacLean. Concurrently, CBC announced the cancellation of George Stroumboulopoulos Tonight after a 10-year run.

Strombo's role on Hockey Night, which was part of an effort to appeal to younger viewers, received mixed reception. Viewers surveyed upon his introduction felt that he was not a "credible" successor to Ron MacLean, In a move which the Toronto Star speculated was meant to help re-gain viewership lost over the first two seasons of the contract (which was also credited to the poor performance of Canadian teams in the 2015–16 season), Sportsnet announced on June 27, 2016, that Stroumboulopoulos had been let go from Rogers, and that Ron MacLean would be reinstated.

=== Apple Music ===
Starting on August 18, 2020, George Stroumboulopoulos became the host for his new show called STROMBO on the newly created Apple Music Hits radio station on Apple Music's live radio. The shows airs Monday to Friday every week at 6:00pm (PST).

He recently partnered with Apple Books to launch the book club "Strombo's Lit".

=== Other works ===
Stroumboulopoulos has also hosted a highly regarded documentary series of CBC, Love, Hate & Propaganda which was based on examining how propaganda affected and lead to shape crucial events that occur in the 20th century. The documentary included War on Terror, Second World War, and the Cold War.

Over the course of his career, he has interviewed multiple sports stars, entertainment icons, and world leaders.

== Charity and public awareness ==
Stroumboulopoulos and The Hour sponsored the 'One Million Acts of Green' Internet Website challenge, calling on Canadians to register environmental acts they've done. The campaign registered over 1.6 million acts on the website. George and his family have been devoted to this cause also supported by Dr. David Suzuki.

Stroumboulopoulos is a strong advocate of social issues and has been actively partaking in many global initiatives and involved with numerous charitable initiatives, such as hosting the 'HipHop4Africa' Mandela Children's Fund Canada and CapAids February 2006 Toronto benefit. He has traveled to the Arctic for a special on literacy, youth culture and the loss of Inuit identity. He has been to Sudan with War Child Canada, and Zambia for a World AIDS Day special documentary. He also supports Make Poverty History. He joined other prominent Canadians in sharing views on global issues in the March 2010 issue of Upstream Journal magazine.

He was executive producer and co-host of Canada for Haiti television with Cheryl Hickey and Ben Mulroney to help the humanitarian crisis in Haiti after a devastating earthquake. He managed to raise over $27 million for the victims of Haitian earthquake.

He also presented at Vancouver's EPIC Expo in May 2011 where he showed support for Fair Trade and the work of Fair Trade Vancouver.

Stroumboulopoulos was selected by the United Nations World Food Programme (WFP) as an official ambassador in March, 2011, thus being named the first Canadian National Ambassador Against Hunger.

== Personal life ==
George Stroumboulopoulos follows a vegan and straight edge lifestyle. He is a fan of the Montreal Canadiens hockey team. He lives in Los Angeles, California.

He has been diagnosed as having post-concussion syndrome, due to his past history of motorcycle crashes, hockey injuries, and fights.

== Awards ==
- The Hour won six Gemini Awards.
  - In 2006 – Viewers Choice Award – Best Host
  - In 2007 – Best Talk Series – Best Host – Best Production/Design
  - In 2008 – Best Host
- Stroumboulopoulos was awarded an honorary Doctor of Laws, from the University of Calgary on November 13, 2007.
- He was also awarded an honorary degree in communications from Humber College in June, 2009.
- In September 2011, he received the inaugural 'Swarovski Humanitarian Award' at the 5th annual Playback Canadian Film and Television Hall of Fame Gala in Toronto.
- On March 6, 2012, the World Economic Forum announced that he had been selected as a Young Global Leader (YGL) for 2012, and was one of three Canadians to receive the indoctrination.
- In 2013, George won the Canadian Screen Award for best host in a variety, lifestyle, reality, and performing arts for George Stroumboulopoulos Tonight.
- In 2023, Stroumboulopoulos was appointed to the Order of Canada for "his leading contributions to Canadian media and journalism as a renowned broadcaster and producer in television and radio."
- In 2024, Stroumboulopoulos was the recipient of the Creative Arts and Design award, presented at Ontario's 2024 Premier's Awards.

He received a Canadian Screen Award nomination for Best Supporting Performance in a Web Program or Series at the 10th Canadian Screen Awards for his role in the comedy web series The Communist's Daughter.

== Filmography ==
=== Film ===
Year	Title	Role	Notes
2004	Going the Distance	VJ George	
2005	The Life and Hard Times of Guy Terrifico	Himself	
2007	The Tracey Fragments	Himself	
2009	Survival of the Dead	Talk Show Host	
2010	Score: A Hockey Musical	Arena Announcer	
2010	Hard Core Logo 2	Himself	
2011	Hobo with a Shotgun	TV Host	
2015	Diamond Tongues	Himself	
2015	A Date with Miss Fortune	Paul	
2015	Being Canadian	Himself	Documentary film
2016	Sadie's Last Days on Earth	Gord	
2018	Design Canada	Himself	Documentary film
2022	Sex with Sue	Himself	TV documentary film
2023	299 Queen Street West	Himself	Documentary film
2026	Antidiva: The Carole Pope Confessions	Himself	Documentary film

=== Television ===
Year	Title	Role	Notes
2000–2004	Various MuchMusic shows	Himself - Host	
2004	The Greatest Canadian	Himself - Host	Tommy Douglas advocate
2005–2014	George Stroumboulopoulos Tonight	Himself - Host	Also titled The Hour
2006	The One: Making a Music Star	Himself - Host	
2008	Rent-a-Goalie	Himself	Episode: "The Cheesemaker's Oath"
2009	Battle of the Blades	Himself - Guest Judge	
2010	Being Erica	Himself	Episode: "Gettin' Wiggy Wit' It"
2012	I, Martin Short, Goes Home	Himself	TV special
2013	Stroumboulopoulos	Himself - Host	
2013	Bomb Girls	Italian Man	Episode: "Something Fierce"
2016	Bitten	Trevor Resayas	Episode: "Of Sonders Weight"
2016	Orphan Black	Interviewer	Episode: "The Mitigation of Competition"

=== Web ===
Year	Title	Role	Notes
2015	The Plateaus	Host	Series
2021	The Communist's Daughter	Peter Kurtriakis	Series; also associate producer
