= Shattered (Walters novel) =

2006 novel by Eric Walters

- First edition
- Author: Eric Walters
- Cover artist: Lisa LaPointe
- Language: English
- Genre: Historical Fiction
- Publisher: Puffin Books
- Publication date: 2006
- Publication place: Canada
- Media type: Print
- Pages: 210

Shattered is a 2006 novel by Eric Walters. It has a foreword from Lieutenant-General Roméo Dallaire, who was the Force Commander for the United Nations Mission to Rwanda.

== Plot ==
15-year-old Ian is a wealthy spoiled teenager, who in order to pass his civics class, must perform community service. He decides to go to "The Club" after being intrigued merely by its name, and little to his knowledge turns out to be a soup kitchen. Over time, he becomes accustomed to the way the homeless are treated and how life on the streets really is. At this soup kitchen, he meets war veteran Sarge, who has PTSD following his role as a UN peacekeeper in the Rwandan genocide.

== Characters ==
- Ian Blackburn (The main character)
- Sarge (Jack/Jacques)
- Berta
- Mr. MacDonald (Mac)
- Mrs. Watkins (Ian's Teacher)

== Awards ==
- Shattered won the Ontario Library Association's White Pine Award in 2007.
- In 2007, Shattered received the Violet Downey Book Award.
