= Ann Connor Brimer Award =

Canadian literary award

- Description: Award for outstanding contribution to Atlantic Canadian children's literature
- Country: Canada (Atlantic Provinces)
- Presented by: The Ann Connor Brimer Award Society

The Ann Connor Brimer Award for Atlantic Canadian Children's Literature is a $5,000 annual award given to an Atlantic Canadian writer deemed to have made an outstanding contribution to literature for young people. Starting in 2016, the prize alternates annually between young adult and children's fiction published in the previous two years.

The Ann Connor Brimer Award is administered by The Ann Connor Brimer Award Society. Nomination information can be found on the websites of the Atlantic Book Awards and the Writers' Federation of Nova Scotia.

The award is named for Ann Elisabeth Connor Brimer. Brimer was a teacher, as well as executive director of the Canadian Learning Materials Centre, a research associate with the Atlantic Institute of Education, a program coordinator in continuing education at Dalhousie University, a founding member of the Nova Scotia Coalition on Arts and Culture, as well as the Atlantic Officer for the Canadian Children's Book Centre.

The award is supported by members of the Brimer family along with donations from the general public.

== Winners ==
- 1991 – Joyce Barkhouse, Pit Pony
- 1992 – Kevin Major, Eating Between the Lines
- 1993 – Budge Wilson, Oliver's War
- 1994 – Lesley Choyce, Good Idea Gone Bad
- 1995 – Sheree Fitch, Mabel Murple
- 1996 – Don Aker, Of Things Not Seen
- 1997 – Janet McNaughton, To Dance at the Palais Royale
- 1998 – Kevin Major, The House of Wooden Santas
- 1999 – Janet McNaughton, Make or Break Spring
- 2000 – David Weale, The True Meaning of Crumbfest
- 2001 – Janet McNaughton, The Secret Under My Skin
- 2002 – Francis Wolfe, Where I Live
- 2003 – Lesley Choyce, Shoulder the Sky
- 2004 – Don Aker, The First Stone
- 2005 – Alice Walsh, Pomiuk, Prince of the North
- 2006 – Kevin Major, Aunt Olga's Christmas Postcards
- 2007 – Budge Wilson, Friendships
- 2008 – K. V. Johansen, Nightwalker
- 2009 – Jill MacLean, The Nine Lives of Travis Keating
- 2010 – Jill MacLean, The Present Tense of Prinny Murphy
- 2011 – Valerie Sherrard, The Glory Wind
- 2012 – Susan White, The Year Mrs. Montague Cried
- 2013 – Lisa Harrington, Live to Tell
- 2014 – Jill MacLean, Nix Minus One
- 2015 – Sharon E. McKay, The End of the Line
- 2016 – Sharon E. McKay, Prison Boy
- 2017 – Lesley Choyce, Into the Wasteland
- 2018 – Charis Cotter, The Painting
- 2019 – Susan Sinnott, Catching the Light
- 2020 – Sheree Fitch, Everybody’s Different on EveryBody Street
- 2021 – Tom Ryan, Keep This to Yourself
- 2022 – Chad Lucas, Thanks a Lot, Universe
- 2023 – Nicola Davison, Decoding Dot Grey
- 2024 – Jack Wong, The Words We Share
- 2025 – Valerie Sherrard, Standing on Neptune (YA)
