= The King of Jam Sandwiches =

Novel by Eric Walters

- 2020 paperback edition
- Author: Eric Walters
- Language: English
- Genres: Children; Fiction
- Published: September 22, 2020
- Publisher: Orca Book Publishers
- Publication place: Canada
- Media type: Print: Paperback; Digitial: eBook, PDF
- Pages: 320
- Award: Governor General’s Literary Award
- ISBN: 9781459825567
- OCLC: 1139533362
- Preceded by: "Elephant Secret"
- Website: orcabook.com

The King of Jam Sandwiches is a children's book written by Canadian author Eric Walters, published in 2020 by Orca Book Publishers. The book is written in a first-person narrative, recounting Walters' own childhood, making it his most personal and most important book. It won the 2020 Governor General's Literary Award for Young People's Literature – Text .

== Backstory ==
Derived from the author's own childhood growing up living in poverty and with a mentally ill parent, The King of Jam Sandwiches is for Eric Walters "the most important book he's ever written" and "certainly the most personal." It is written using a first-person narrative, which gives the book a genuine tone.

== Plot ==
Robbie is a 13-year-old boy guarding the secret that he is living with a dad who is not mentally well. Sometimes his dad would wake him up in the middle of the night to talk about dying. He would at times leave without telling Robbie where he's going. Once he was gone for more than a week. Robbie was terrified of being left alone but could tell no one, fearing even more that he could be placed in foster care if anyone knew.

This all changes when Robbie is asked to show Harmony, a new student, and a tough fast talking foster child, around school. On day one, she punches him in the face. After realizing they both have a lot in common, they become close friends. Robbie is however unsure whether he can trust her enough to share his secret.

== Awards ==
The King of Jam Sandwiches won the 2020 Governor General’s Literary Award for Young People's Literature – Text.

== Reception ==
The novel was generally well received. Deborah Dundas of the Toronto Star writes, "He provides an intimate and hopeful perspective and a glimpse into a world we rarely see closely enough to understand." In the weekly Canadian Review of Materials, Teresa Iaizz from the Toronto Public Library finds it, "written in a nonjudgmental and compassionate way", "allows children to better understand a very serious topic." Amanda Toth at the School Library Journal writes, "Highly recommended for most middle grade sections."
