= A Girl Like That (novel) =

2018 novel by Tanaz Bhathena

First edition (publ. Farrar Straus Giroux)

A Girl Like That is a 2018 novel by Tanaz Bhathena. The book was nominated for the 2019 Ontario Library Association White Pine Award.

== Plot summary ==
The book begins with a car crash and the death of the two main characters, Zarin and Porus, two fictional teenagers from Jeddah, Saudi Arabia. Their ghosts watch from the wreckage, and see the reactions of their families and friends. The rest of the novel reveals the events that occurred before the car crash.

== Reception ==
A Girl Like That was reviewed by Quill & Quire, Kirkus Reviews, The Globe and Mail, and CBC Radio.

Anum Shafqat, a staff writer for The Harvard Crimson, rated the novel as 4.5 stars.

== See also ==
- The Beauty of the Moment
- Hunted by the Sky
