= Lisa Harrington =

Canadian writer (born 1965)

Lisa Harrington (born 6 July 1965) is a Canadian writer from Nova Scotia. She won the Ann Connor Brimer Award in 2013 for her book Live to Tell.

== Biography ==
Lisa Harrington was born on 6 July 1965 in Amherst, Nova Scotia. She attended Mount Saint Vincent University, graduating with a degree in education, followed by Acadia University where she earned a Bachelor of Arts in English. After finishing her education, she worked as a schoolteacher at elementary and junior high schools. She began writing after the death of her mother, creating a story for six identical necklaces left behind in her possessions without explanation. While writing this story, she took a course directed by Norene Smiley through the Writers' Federation of Nova Scotia, subsequently entering her story into the Atlantic Writers competition and winning third place. Harrington's first published piece of writing was a short story called A Nanna Mary Christmas, which appeared in the 2008 Christmas anthology A Maritime Christmas.

Harrington's first novel, Rattled, was published in 2010 by Nimbus Publishing. In 2013, she won the Ann Connor Brimer Award for her book Live to Tell. The book received nominations for the White Pine Award, the SYRCA Snow Willow Award, and the Arthur Ellis Award.

== Publications ==
=== Books ===
- Harrington, Lisa (2010). Rattled. Halifax, N.S.: Nimbus Publishing. ISBN 978-1-5510-9783-1.
- — (2012). Live to Tell. Markham, ON: Dancing Cat Books. ISBN 978-1-7708-6217-3.
- — (2014). Twisted. Toronto: Cormorant Books. ISBN 978-1-7708-6413-9.
- — (2018). The Goodbye Girls. Halifax, N.S.: Nimbus Publishing. ISBN 978-1-7710-8635-6.
- — (2019). The Big Dig. Halifax, N.S.: Nimbus Publishing. ISBN 978-1-7710-8754-4.

=== Short fiction ===
- Harrington, Lisa (2008). "A Nanna Mary Christmas". A Maritime Christmas. Introduction by Clary Croft. Halifax, N.S.: Nimbus Publishing. ISBN 978-1-5510-9685-8.
