= Zoe Cleland =

Canadian actress and filmmaker

Zoe Cleland is a Canadian actress and filmmaker, originally from Toronto, Ontario, and currently based in St. John's, Newfoundland and Labrador. She is most noted for her supporting performance as Tatiana in the web series The Communist's Daughter, for which she received a Canadian Screen Award nomination for Best Supporting Performance in a Web Program or Series at the 10th Canadian Screen Awards in 2022.

Born and raised in Toronto, she first became familiar with Newfoundland as a teenager, after her parents separated and her mother, writer Charis Cotter, moved to Western Bay.

She shot her debut short film, Blueberries for Iris, in the Western Bay area in 2023, and subsequently moved to St. John's in 2025. In St. John's she has had regular stage roles with the city's Perchance Theatre, and has received a grant to create her debut feature film. In 2026 she won the Michelle Jackson Emerging Filmmaker Award from the St. John's International Women's Film Festival.

== Filmography ==
Year	Title	Role	Notes
2008	The Jon Dore Television Show		One episode
2008	Murdoch Mysteries	Eva Rookwood	One episode
2013	Dangerous Persuasions	Bonnie Stan	One episode
2013	Guidance	Morgan	Five episodes
2013–14	Reign	Odette	Two episodes
2014	Pay Up	Shawna	Two episodes
2015	Saving Hope	Brianna Pierre	One episode
2015	How to Plan an Orgy in a Small Town	Young Cassie	
2016	Murdoch Mysteries	Joanne Perly	One episode
2017	Frankie Drake Mysteries	Zelda Purser	One episode
2018	Ace of Rods	Annie Castleton	One episode
2021	The Communist's Daughter	Tatiana	Five episodes
2023	Blueberries for Iris	Iris	Also writer, director
2025	The Newcomer		Writer, director
2026	Hudson & Rex	Bryana Francis	One episode
