= The Communist's Daughter =

2021 Canadian comedy digital series

The Communist's Daughter is a Canadian comedy web series, which premiered on CBC Gem in 2021 and is loosely based on creator, head writer and director Leah Cameron's own life. It was nominated for 6 Canadian Screen Awards and won the Web Series World Cup in 2021, making it the most awarded series in the world digital festival circuit that year, the first Canadian series to win the cup and Cameron the first female creator to win it. Set in 1989, just before the Berlin Wall is about to fall, the series stars Sofia Banzhaf as Dunyasha McDougald, the teenage daughter of Marxist activist parents Ian (Aaron Poole) and Carol (Jessica Holmes) McDougald; after the family moves to a new—and conservative—Toronto neighbourhood, she falls for wealthy introvert Marc L'Ouverture (Kolton Stewart) despite being an outsider in her new school's social hierarchy, only for her father to mount a municipal council campaign against incumbent councillor Rod Bigmann (Chris Locke), Marc's step-father.

The cast also includes Ryan Taerk, Nadine Bhabha, Zoe Cleland, Vieslav Krystyan, George Stroumboulopoulos, Sandra Battaglini, Neema Nazeri, Manuel Rodriguez-Saenz, Nadine Whiteman Roden and Jacob Soley.

== Production ==
Cameron wrote a half-hour pilot for the show a few years after her father died in 2012. The pilot, and the digital series she subsequently developed, is based on the intense Marxist phase her father went through in the 1980s and his numerous election runs. The digital series was first developed through Women In the Directors Chair's Story and Leadership Program with Cameron and producer Natalie Novak Remplakowski winning CBC Comedy's Pitch Program at Just for Laughs in Montreal shortly after. It was funded in part by a Kickstarter campaign in early 2019, and went into production that fall with Natalie Novak Remplakowski producing, Lauren Corber executive producing and Palmer Baranek associate producing through LoCo Motion Pictures. It was released on CBC Gem in March 2021.

== Episodes ==
No. overall	No. in season	Title	Directed by	Written by	Original release date
1	1	"Opium for the Masses"	Leah Cameron	Leah Cameron	TBA
2	2	"The Apple Orchard"	Leah Cameron	Leah Cameron	TBA
3	3	"New Kid from the Soviet Block"	Leah Cameron	Waneta Storms	TBA
4	4	"Mall Bangs"	Leah Cameron	Clara Altimas	TBA
5	5	"This Means War"	Leah Cameron	Kaveh Mohebbi	TBA
6	6	"99 Pink Balloons"	Leah Cameron	Leah Cameron and Kaveh Mohebbi	TBA
7	7	"The Great Ward Five Debate"	Leah Cameron	Spencer Thompson	TBA
8	8	"Dream the Impossible Dream"	Leah Cameron	Peter Murphy	TBA

== Critical response ==
John Doyle of The Globe and Mail named the series as "One of the 21 Best TV Series to Stream so Far in 2021", praising the series by saying it was "clearly a labour of love" inspired by the memory of Cameron's late father and that "it showed." He went on to praise the show's cast saying the series was a reminder of the talent there is in Canada and how wonderful it was to see all cast members throw themselves into their roles. "

Etan Vlessing of The Hollywood Reporter noted that the "sophisticated satire" in the series comes from the "fact that Ian McDougald, a modern-day Don Quixote, denies the collapse of communism just as the Berlin Wall falls and chooses to keep his family in an ersatz reality." He writes that the family's "madcap adventures are less about pushing political radicalism than just having outsized dreams of society sharing the wealth in a workers' paradise."

Freelance television critic Bill Brioux gave the series "mixed Marx", writing that the series reminded him of his own experience making low-budget community channel comedy programs for Maclean-Hunter in his youth and praising the fact that Cameron got the opportunity to make it, but stating that he wished it was funnier. He further wrote that "it is so apples and oranges, but I also can't help but compare this series to Never Have I Ever, an exceptional Netflix sitcom that premiered last year featuring Mississauga teen Maitreyi Ramakrishnan. It is also a fish out of water story set in high school, a clash of Indian culture and Americana. To be fair, The Communist’s Daughter was probably made for the craft services budget on Never Have I Ever."

== Awards ==
Award	Date of ceremony	Category	Recipient(s)	Result	Ref(s)
Canadian Screen Awards	2022	Direction, Web Program or Series	Leah Cameron	Nominated	
Canadian Screen Awards	2022	Web Program or Series, Fiction	Lauren Corber, Leah Cameron, Natalie Novak Remplakowski	Nominated	
Canadian Screen Awards	2022	Lead Performance, Web Program or Series	Jessica Holmes	Nominated	
Canadian Screen Awards	2022	Supporting Performance, Web Program or Series	Nadine Bhabha	Nominated	
Canadian Screen Awards	2022	Supporting Performance, Web Program or Series	Zoe Cleland	Nominated	
Canadian Screen Awards	2022	Supporting Performance, Web Program or Series	George Stroumboulopoulos	Won	
Canadian Screen Music Awards	2022	Best Original Main Title Theme Music	Peter Chapman	Pending	

The series also won 20 awards from web series festivals throughout 2021, and was named the winner of the 2021 Web Series World Cup as the most awarded web series of the year.
