= We All Fall Down (Walters novel) =

2006 novel by Eric Walters

- Random House first edition cover art
- Author: Eric Walters
- Language: English
- Published: Toronto: Random House of Canada, 23 January 2007
- Media type: Book
- Pages: 195
- Awards: Red Maple Award in 2007
- ISBN: 0385661924
- OCLC: 370171103

We All Fall Down is a novel by Canadian author Eric Walters, published in 2006 by Random House of Canada. The story follows Will, a ninth-grade student, spending a day with his father at the World Trade Center on September 11, 2001. It was awarded the Red Maple Award in 2007 and was an honor book for the 2008 Manitoba Young Reader's Choice Award. A sequel, United We Stand, was released in 2009.

== Synopsis ==
Ninth-grader Will Fuller shadows his father, the vice president of an international trading company based in the World Trade Center. He is not looking forward to the visit, as his father has always been very focused on his work and Will worries that his father will not bother to make time for him.

Will's visit takes place on the morning of the September 11, 2001 attacks, and is told in rapid first-person narration as Will, his father, and other staff in the tower offices attempt to escape during the building's collapse. Will's best friend James's father works as a New York firefighter, adding another element of danger to the narrative.

We All Fall Down received predominantly very positive reviews, but received some criticism for lengthy exposition designed to explain the background of the terrorist attacks to readers.

== See also ==
- United We Stand, the sequel that focuses on the aftermath of 9/11.
