= Janet McNaughton =

Canadian writer

- Born: November 29, 1953 (age 72); Toronto, Canada
- Occupation: Writer
- Writing career
- Notable awards: Mr. Christie's Book Award

Janet McNaughton (born November 29, 1953) is a Canadian writer from Newfoundland and Labrador. She wrote the coming of age novel, An Earthly Knight, published in 2003.

== Life ==
She was born in Toronto, Ontario, and stayed there for 26 years, moving to St. John's in 1979.

McNaughton got into writing early and was only fifteen when she began to write her first book. It was a historical novel intended for a young readers but she did not finish it. However, the writing helped her to identify her interest, a love for learning about people's lifestyles and thoughts in the past. She pursued this interest by studying folklore in university and went on to complete a Ph.D in Folklore.

Her novel An Earthly Knight drew inspiration from two ancient ballads: Tam Lin and Lady Isabel and the Elf Knight.

== Awards ==
McNaughton has been awarded the Violet Downey National Chapter of the IODE Book Award for the best Canadian English Language Children's Book, the Ann Connor Brimer Award for Children's Literature in Atlantic Canada, and the Geoffrey Bilson Award for Historical Fiction for Young People. She also received the Mr. Christie's Book Award for The Secret Under My Skin and was short-listed for a Governor General's Literary Award in 1998.
