= Tanaz Bhathena =

Canadian author

Tanaz Bhathena is a Canadian author. She has written multiple books that have been nominated for Ontario Library Association awards. She was described as one of 11 South Asian young adult authors to watch for in 2023 by Teen Vogue.

== Life ==
Bhathena was born in Mumbai to a Parsi family, and later lived in Saudi Arabia. She moved to Canada when she was a teenager, and now lives in Mississauga with her family. Bhathena has a Bachelor of Commerce degree. She worked as a teaching assistant before applying to a creative writing program.

== Books ==
- A Girl Like That (2018). Nominated for the 2019 White Pine Award.
- The Beauty of the Moment (2019). Nominated for the 2020 White Pine Award.
- Hunted by the Sky (2020). Won the 2021 White Pine Award.
- Rising Like a Storm (2021).
- Of Light and Shadow (2023). Nominated for the 2024 White Pine Award.
- Witch Daughter (2026).
