= The Hydrofoil Mystery =

1999 young adult novel by Eric Walters

- Author: Eric Walters
- Language: English
- Genre: Young adult novel
- Publisher: Viking Press
- Publication date: 1999
- Publication place: Canada
- Media type: Print (Hardback & Paperback)
- Pages: 224 pp
- ISBN: 978-0-670-88186-4
- OCLC: 39868657

The Hydrofoil Mystery was written in 1999 by Canadian author Eric Walters. It is about a teenage boy named Billy McCracken, whose mother arranges for him to go away for the summer to work with none other than the well-known inventor of the telephone, Alexander Graham Bell. Billy expects his summer to be boring, but with the German U-boats endangering the maritime coast, his work with Bell's hydrofoil becomes an adventure.

The book is set during the first World War and although it is a work of fiction, it serves as a launching pad for discussions about Canada's involvement in the war and the contributions of Canada's leading scientist, Alexander Graham Bell.

The novel was a finalist for the 1999 Geoffrey Bilson Award.
