= United We Stand (novel) =

2009 novel by Eric Walters

United We Stand by eric walters
- Author: Eric Walters
- Language: English
- Genre: Young adult novel
- Publisher: Doubleday Canada
- Publication date: September 8, 2009
- Publication place: Canada
- Media type: Print (hardback & paperback)
- ISBN: 978-0-307-37264-2

United We Stand is a novel by the Canadian author Eric Walters, and is the sequel to the award-winning book We All Fall Down. The story begins on the day after the first book ends, September 12, 2001.
