= Weird Rules to Follow =

2022 children's book by Kim Spencer

- Author: Kim Spencer
- Language: English
- Genre: Children's fiction
- Publisher: Orca Book Publishers
- Publication date: October 2022
- Pages: 192
- ISBN: 9781459835580

Weird Rules to Follow is a 2022 children's fiction book by Kim Spencer of Ts'msyen Nation.

== Publication ==
The book is written by Kim Spencer of the Ts'msyen Nation. It was published by Orca Book Publishers in October 2022.

== Synopsis ==
The book is set in the 1980's, in the real coastal fishing village of Prince Rupert, British Columbia.

The book focuses on the lives of protagonist Mia and her friend Lara. Both are young teenagers and neighbours; Mia is Indigenous and relatively less affluent, Lara is middle-class. The book contrasts the girls' indifference to their different social-economic class and the wider communities greater focus on their families' differences. Themes in the book include intolerance and stereotypes.

== Critical reception ==
Weird Rules to Follow was the fifth best selling book in British Columbia in early November 2022. Speaking on radio show The Next Chapter in December 2022, writer Ken Setterington praised the author for writing in her own style and for producing what he called "a beautiful book."
