= Jack Wong (writer) =

Canadian writer and illustrator

Jack Wong is a Canadian writer and illustrator of children's books. He is most noted as a winner of the Governor General's Award for English-language Young People's Literature - Illustrated Books at the 2023 Governor General's Awards for When You Can Swim, and the Ann Connor Brimer Award at the 2024 Atlantic Book Awards for The Words We Share.

Born in Hong Kong and raised in Vancouver, British Columbia, he moved to Halifax, Nova Scotia, in 2010 to attend NSCAD University after deciding to abandon his career in engineering to study art.

== Works ==
- When You Can Swim - 2023
- The Words We Share - 2023
- All That Grows - 2024

== Awards and nominations ==
| Year | Award | Category | Work | Result | Ref. |
|---|---|---|---|---|---|
| 2023 | Governor General's Awards | English-language Children's Illustration | When You Can Swim | Winner | |
| 2024 | Atlantic Book Awards | Ann Conner Brimer Award | The Words We Share | Winner | |
| 2024 | Forest of Reading | Blue Spruce Award | The Words We Share | Finalist | |
