= Beth Goobie =

Canadian poet and fiction writer (born 1959)

- Born: 1959 (age 66–67); Guelph, Ontario, Canada
- Education: University of Winnipeg
- Writing career
- Language: English

Beth Goobie (born 1959) is a Canadian poet and fiction writer.

== Life ==
Beth Goobie grew up in Guelph, Ontario, Canada. After working one year in Holland as an au pair, she spent the next four years earning a B.A. in English Literature from the University of Winnipeg and a B.A. in Religious Studies from the Mennonite Brethren Bible College. After working as a front line residential treatment worker in Winnipeg and Edmonton, she moved to Saskatoon, where she now lives.

== Writing ==
Goobie's first published poems were "To the Creator" and "The Making in Edges Literary Magazine in February 1987. Her work has appeared in many Canadian literary journals, including The Fiddlehead, Malahat Review, The New Quarterly, Antigonish Review, Event, Grain, Prairie Fire and The Prairie Journal. Her poem "Civilization lives in the throat" was selected by Giller Prize winner Souvankham Thammavongsa for inclusion in 2021 Best Canadian Poetry (Biblioasis).

As of 2017, she has 25 published books to her credit, including the genres of young adult fiction (18 books), children's (one book), one adult novel, 2 collections of short fiction, and 3 collections of poetry.

== Awards ==
- 1994 R. Ross Annett Juvenile Fiction Award for Mission Impossible.
- 1995 Pat Lowther Award
- 1998 Joseph S. Stauffer Award (Canada Council)
- 2000 Canadian Library Association Young Adult Book Award for Before Wings
- 2000 Saskatchewan Book Award for Children's Literature for "Before Wings"
- 2003 Saskatchewan Book Award for Children's Literature for "Flux"
- 2004 Saskatchewan Book Award for Children's Literature for "Fixed"
- 2017 Saskatchewan YA Book Award for "The Pain Eater"
- 2017 High Plains YA Book Award for "The Pain Eater"
- 2017 Snow Willow Award for "The Pain Eater"
- 2018 Saskatchewan Arts Board Book Award for Poetry for "breathing at dusk"
- 2018 City of Saskatoon and Saskatoon Public Library Book Award for "breathing at dusk"
- 2021 Carter V. Cooper Award

== Works ==
=== Poetry ===
- Scars of Light. Edmonton: NeWest Press. 1994. ISBN 0-920897-73-8.
- The Girls Who Dream Me: Poems. Pedlar Press. 1999. ISBN 978-0-9681884-6-0.
- Breathing at Dusk: Poems: Coteau Books, Regina, 2017
- Lookin' for Joy: Exile Editions, Holstein Ontario, 2022

=== Short stories ===
- Could I Have My Body Back Now, Please?. Edmonton: NeWest Press. 1991. ISBN 0-920897-09-6.
- The Only-Good Heart: Pedlar Press, Toronto, 1998

=== Adult fiction ===
- The First Principles of Dreaming, Second Story Press, 2014

=== Young adult fiction ===
- Group Homes From Outer Space. Don Mills, Ontario: Maxwell Macmillan Canada. 1992. ISBN 0-02-954093-3.
- Who Owns Kelly Paddik?: Maxwell Macmillan, Don Mills, Ontario, 1993
- Sticks and Stones: Maxwell Macmillan, Don Mills, Ontario, 1994
- Hit and Run: Maxwell Macmillan, Don Mills, Ontario, 1994
- Mission Impossible. Red Deer, Alta.: Red Deer College Press. 1994. ISBN 0-88995-114-4.
- Kicked Out: Prentice Hall Ginn, Toronto, 1995
- I'm Not Convinced: Red Deer Press, Calgary, 1997
- The Good, The Bad, And The Suicidal: Roussan Publishers Incorporated, Montreal, 1997
- The Colours of Carol Molev: Roussan Publishers Incorporated, Montreal, 1998
- The Dream Where the Losers Go: Roussan Publishers Incorporated, Montreal, 1999
- Before Wings. Victoria, BC: Orca Book Publishers. 2001. ISBN 978-1-55143-163-5.
- The Dream Where Losers Go. Victoria, BC: Orca Book Publishers. 2001. ISBN 978-1-55143-455-1.
- The Lottery (Beth Goobie). Victoria, BC.: Orca Book Publishers. 2002. ISBN 978-1-55143-238-0.
- Kicked Out. Victoria, BC: Orca Book Publishers. 2002. ISBN 978-1-55143-244-1.
- Sticks and Stones. Victoria, BC: Orca Book Publishers. 2002. ISBN 978-1-55143-213-7.
- Who Owns Kelly Paddik?. Victoria, BC: Orca Book Publishers. 2003. ISBN 978-1-55143-239-7.
- Flux. Victoria, BC: Orca Book Publishers. 2004. ISBN 978-1-55143-314-1.
- Fixed. Victoria, BC: Orca Book Publishers. 2005. ISBN 978-1-55143-374-5.
- Something Girl. Victoria, BC: Orca Book Publishers. 2005. ISBN 978-1-55143-560-2.
- Hello, Groin. Victoria, BC: Orca Book Publishers. 2005. ISBN 978-1-55143-459-9.
- Born Ugly. Red Deer Press. 2011. ISBN 978-0-88995-457-1.
- The Throne: Red Deer Press, Markham, 2013
- The Pain Eater: Second Story Press, 2016.

=== Young Adult Drama ===
- The Face Is The Place, Rave: Young Adult Drama: Blizzard Publishing, Winnipeg, 2000

=== Children's Novel ===
- Jason's Why: Red Deer Press, Markham, 2013
