= The Bonemender =

Fantasy novel series by Holly Bennett

The Bonemender (trilogy)
- The Bonemender, Bonemender's Oath, Bonemender's Choice
- Author: Holly Bennett
- Country: United States
- Language: English
- Genre: Young adult novel, Fantasy
- Publisher: Orca Book Publishers
- Published: September 1, 2005 - September 1, 2007
- Media type: Print (paperback), e-book

The Bonemender series is a trilogy of young-adult fantasy novels by Holly Bennett between 2005 and 2007 through Orca Book Publishers. The first novel, The Bonemender, was published on September 1, 2005, with the subsequent novels, Bonemender's Oath and Bonemender's Choice publishing on November 1, 2006, and September 1, 2007.

== Synopsis ==
The books follow Gabrielle, a young woman that is not only a princess but also possesses special healing abilities. The first book finds her coping with a war on the border of her lands, with the second book showing how she and her brother Tristan deal with its aftermath. The final book has Gabrielle travelling overseas and dealing with a deadly plague known as the "Gray Veil".

== Novels in series ==
1. The Bonemender (2005) ISBN 978-1-5514-3336-3
2. Bonemender's Oath (2006) ISBN 978-1-5514-3443-8
3. Bonemender's Choice (2007) ISBN 978-1-5514-3718-7

== Reception ==
Critical reception for the books was positive, with the School Library Journal reviewing all three books in the series and giving the first a positive review. The Quill & Quire gave a mostly positive review, commenting that it took Bennett "a while to find her footing" but that she "captures with vigorous realism the bloodiness, brutality, and hardship of war".

== See also ==
- Redwing, a related novel by Holly Bennett
