= Sheree Fitch =

Canadian writer and literacy advocate

- Born: 3 December 1956 (age 69); Ottawa, Ontario, Canada
- Occupation: Writer
- Writing career
- Genres: Children's literature, poetry, fiction
- Notable awards: Officer of the Order of Canada

Sheree Lynn Fitch OC (born 3 December 1956) is a Canadian writer and literacy advocate. Known primarily for her children's books, she has also published poetry and fiction for adults.

== Biography ==
Fitch was born on 3 December 1956 in Ottawa, Ontario, where her father was serving with the Royal Canadian Mounted Police. Her father was originally from Nova Scotia, and her mother was from Sussex, New Brunswick. Sheree is the eldest of three children. When she was less than a year old, the family moved to Miramichi, New Brunswick. Three years later they moved to Moncton, where they lived for ten years, and then to Fredericton. Fitch graduated from Fredericton High School in 1974 as her class's valedictorian. She married while still in her teens and had two sons, whom she raised as a single parent after divorcing at the age of 24.

Fitch attended St. Thomas University in Fredericton as a mature student and graduated with a Bachelor of Arts degree in English in 1987. She earned a Master of Arts in English from Acadia University in 1994. Her MA thesis was entitled "The Sweet Chorus of Ha, Ha, He!" Polyphony in utterature: A collection of writings on children's poetry. In it she coined the term "utterature" to refer to "all literature which depends upon the oral tradition and community of listeners".

In the 1990s, Fitch was based in Halifax, Nova Scotia, where her second husband Gilles Plante worked for the Canadian Broadcasting Corporation. In 2001, he was transferred to Washington, D.C., and she spent almost 10 years there. Fitch and her husband moved to River John, Nova Scotia, when he retired from the CBC. Gilles Plante died in March 2024.

== Writing for children ==
Fitch is best known as the author of children's poetry books characterized by "exuberant wordplay and humour". She began writing poems for her own young sons, and took creative writing courses to develop her skills. She performed her poems at schools and libraries for several years before her first book, Toes in My Nose, with illustrations by Molly Bobak, was published in 1987. Her second book, Sleeping Dragons All Around, was published in 1989 and won that year's Atlantic Booksellers' Choice Award. Its title comes from a line in the poem The Eve of St. Agnes, by John Keats.

During the 1990s, Doubleday Canada published several of Fitch's books of children's poetry, a number of which won awards. In 1992, There Were Monkeys in My Kitchen won the Canadian Children's Book Centre's Mr. Christie's Book Award for a book for children eight years and under. Her 1995 book, Mabel Murple won the Ann Connor Brimer Award, and in 2000 she was awarded the Vicky Metcalf Award for Literature for Young People, which is presented to a Canadian author for a "body of work (at least four books) that, in the opinion of the judges, demonstrates the highest literary standards". If You Could Wear My Sneakers: A Book about Children's Rights, which was published in 1998, was commissioned by UNICEF. Its 15 poems are based on some of the articles of the United Nations Convention on the Rights of the Child, including the rights to education, privacy, free speech and protection from war. Canadian journalist and broadcaster Peter Gzowski wrote the foreword for the book, which won the Ontario Library Association's Silver Birch Award and the Atlantic Canadian Hackmatack Children's Choice Award.

In the 2000s, Fitch continued to publish books for young children, including her first board book, Kisses Kisses Baby-O, which was presented to the families of all babies born in Nova Scotia in 2008 as part of a family literacy program. She also expanded her range to the young adult fiction audience with her 2002 novel One More Step, followed by The Gravesavers in 2005.

In addition to poetry and novels, Fitch has written two non-fiction books for children who are aspiring writers: Breathe, Stretch, Write: Learning to Write with Everything You've Got, and Writing Maniac: How I Grew up to be a Writer (And You Can Too).

== Writing for adults ==
In 1993, Fitch's book of poetry for adults, In This House are Many Women, was published. It deals with serious issues in the lives of working-class women. The title refers to a sequence of poems set in a shelter for women escaping domestic violence. The author identifies strongly with the women in her poems, who are presented as survivors. Like her work for children, the adult poems play with words, but the material is darker, as in "Civil Servant", in which a receptionist in an unemployment office imagines herself as Saint Peter at the Pearly gates, asking her clients "Can I have your sin?" (i.e. social insurance number). An expanded edition of In This House are Many Women was published in 2004.

Fitch's first novel for adults, Kiss the Joy as it Flies, was published in 2008. The heroine is a single parent and a writer with "realistic financial and familial problems, who experiences dark times without losing her playfulness and humour". Kiss the Joy as it Flies was shortlisted for the 2009 Stephen Leacock Memorial Medal for Humour.

== Literacy advocacy and honours ==
Fitch is active in the promotion of literacy, both through her writing and performing for children, and through her support of literacy organizations. In the 1990s she was a frequent guest and member of a discussion panel on Peter Gzowski's Morningside radio program on CBC Radio One. As a result, she became involved in the Peter Gzowski Invitational (PGI) golf tournaments, which raise funds for literacy organizations. She has often acted as the PGI tournament's poet laureate, including several times when the event was held in the Arctic.

She is the Honorary Patron of the Literacy Coalition of New Brunswick (LCNB). The LCNB's Fitch Adult Learner Scholarship Awards, which are awarded annually, honour her commitment to the cause of literacy. She is also Honorary Spokesperson for the Nova Scotia Read to Me program. She sponsors the annual Sheree Fitch Prize for Young Writers awarded by the Writers' Federation of New Brunswick to a writer between 14 and 18 years old.

Fitch was granted an honorary Doctor of Letters degree by Saint Mary's University in Halifax in May 1998. In May 2004, she was awarded an honorary Doctor of Letters degree by Acadia University. St. Thomas University awarded her an honorary doctorate in May 2010, citing her contributions as an author, educator, and "tireless advocate for literacy".

Fitch was appointed to the Order of Canada in June 2023 with the rank of Officer. She lives in River John, Nova Scotia.

In 2025, she was named the recipient of the Writers' Trust of Canada's Matt Cohen Award for her body of work.

== Bibliography ==
=== For children ===
- Toes in My Nose and Other Poems. Illustrated by Molly Bobak. Toronto, Doubleday, 1987. ISBN 0-385-25106-8
- Sleeping Dragons All Around. Illustrated by Michelle Nidenoff. Toronto, Doubleday, 1989. ISBN 0-385-25165-3
- Merry-Go-Day. Illustrated by Molly Bobak. Toronto, Doubleday, 1991. ISBN 0-385-25244-7
- There Were Monkeys in My Kitchen. Illustrated by Marc Mongeau. Toronto, Doubleday, 1992. ISBN 0-385-25470-9
- I Am Small. Illustrated by Kim LaFave. Toronto, Doubleday, 1994. ISBN 0-385-25455-5
- Mabel Murple. Illustrated by Maryann Kovalski. Toronto, Doubleday, 1995. ISBN 0-385-25480-6
- If You Could Wear My Sneakers. Illustrated by Darcia Labrosse. Toronto, Doubleday, 1997. ISBN 0-385-25597-7
- The Hullabaloo Bugaboo Day. Illustrated by Jill Quinn. East Lawrencetown, Nova Scotia, Pottersfield Press, 1997. ISBN 1-895900-10-7
- There's A Mouse In My House!. Illustrated by Leslie E. Watts. Toronto, Doubleday, 1998. ISBN 0-385-25561-6
- If I Were The Moon. Illustrated by Leslie E. Watts. Toronto, Doubleday, 1999. ISBN 978-0-385-25744-2
- The Other Author, Arthur. Illustrated by Jill Quinn. East Lawrencetown, Nova Scotia, Pottersfield Press, 1999. ISBN 978-1-895900-20-0
- Everybody's Different on Everybody Street. Illustrated by Laura Jolicoeur. Halifax, Nova Scotia Hospital Foundation. 2001. ISBN 978-0-9681578-1-7
- No Two Snowflakes. Illustrated by Janet Wilson. Victoria, B.C., Orca, 2001. ISBN 978-1-55143-227-4
- Persnickety Pete (The Cleanest Boy in the World). Illustrated by Jane Wallace-Mitchell. Melbourne, Pearson Education Australia, 2003. ISBN 978-0-12-360257-2
- Pocket Rocks. Illustrated by Helen Flook. Victoria, B.C., Orca, 2004. ISBN 978-1-55143-289-2
- Peek-a-Little Boo. Illustrated by Laura Watson. Victoria, B.C., Orca, 2005. ISBN 1-55143-342-7
- If I Had A Million Onions. Illustrated by Yayo. Vancouver, Tradewind Books, 2005. ISBN 978-1-896580-78-4
- Kisses Kisses Baby-O!. Illustrated by Hilda Rose. Halifax, Nimbus, 2008. ISBN 978-1-55109-646-9
- Night Sky Wheel Ride. Illustrated by Yayo. Vancouver, Tradewind Books, 2013. ISBN 978-1-896580-67-8

=== For young adults ===
- One More Step. Victoria, B.C., Orca, 2002. ISBN 978-1-55143-248-9
- The Gravesavers. Toronto, Doubleday, 2005. ISBN 978-0-385-66073-0
- Pluto's Ghost. Toronto, Doubleday, 2010. ISBN 978-0-385-66590-2
- I Died on a Hot June Day. Halifax, Fierce Ink Press, 2013. E-book

=== For adults ===
- In This House There Are Many Women, and Other Poems. Fredericton, N.B., Goose Lane, 2004. ISBN 978-0-86492-416-2
- Kiss The Joy As It Flies. Halifax, Nimbus, 2008. ISBN 978-1-55109-653-7

=== Educational ===
- Writing Maniac: How I Grew Up to Be a Writer (And You Can, Too!). Markham, Ontario, Pembroke Publishers, 2000. ISBN 978-1-55138-121-3
- The Poetry Experience: Choosing and Using Poetry in the Classroom . Sheree Fitch and Larry Swartz. Markham, Ontario, Pembroke Publishers, 2008. ISBN 978-1-55138-223-4
- Breathe, Stretch, Write: Learning to Write with Everything You've Got. Markham, Ontario, Pembroke Publishers, 2011. ISBN 978-1-55138-256-2
