= Elixir (Walters novel) =

2005 novel by Eric Walters

- First edition
- Author: Eric Walters
- Cover artist: John Mantha
- Language: English
- Genre: Historical fiction
- Published: 2005
- Publisher: Viking Press
- Publication place: Canada
- Media type: Paperback, hardcover
- Pages: 182
- ISBN: 0143016415

Elixir is a children's historical novel by Canadian author Eric Walters. It takes place at the University of Toronto in Toronto, Ontario, in the year of 1921 and is based on the discovery of insulin by Frederick Banting and Charles Best. The story is told from Ruth's point of view.

== Plot summary ==
12-year-old Ruth and her mother (Elizabeth Williams) go to the University of Toronto where Ruth's mother works as a custodian. While Ruth is outside studying Spelling Dictation), Dr. Banting, a doctor in search for a cure for diabetes, comes over and invites her to tea. However, Ruth is horrified when she discovers that Dr. Banting and his assistant Dr. Best are testing treatments on dogs. Just outside, a group of protesters called the Dr. Banting are protesting about animal rights. Ruth meets Mellisa Jones, the leader of the Ontario Anti-Vivisection, and Ruth agrees to help them free the dogs. But when Ruth meets Emma, a girl with diabetes who needs a treatment, Ruth's opinions change and she tries to stop the rescue. When she meets Dr. Banting, she discovers that they are testing the treatment on a dog already in a diabetic coma. They try the insulin and succeed.

== Reception ==
Quill and Quire reviewed the work and wrote "Elixir's earnestness makes for a sweet but pedantic story better suited to educational purposes than a popular readership. In exploring the more controversial aspects of Banting’s research, Walters has humanized the man, but Ruth remains a one-dimensional character, less interesting than the history for which she’s a foil." The Canadian Review of Materials wrote an overall favorable review but opined that the "introduction of the child suffering from Type 1 diabetes should have been introduced closer to the beginning of the story instead of near the end."
