= Hunted by the Sky =

2020 novel by Tanaz Bhathena

- Author: Tanaz Bhathena
- Language: English
- Genre: Fantasy
- Published: 2020
- Publisher: Farrar, Straus and Giroux
- Publication place: Canada
- Pages: 320
- Awards: White Pine Award
- ISBN: 9780374313104
- Website: Penguin Random House

Hunted by the Sky is a fantasy novel by Tanaz Bhathena that was published in 2020. It won the 2021 White Pine Award.

== Reception ==
The book was reviewed by Quill & Quire, The Hindu, and The New Indian Express.

== See also ==
- A Girl Like That (novel)
- The Beauty of the Moment
