= Charis Cotter =

Canadian author, editor, and storyteller

Charis Cotter is a Canadian author and storyteller known for her works of fiction for middle-grade readers.

== Early life and education ==
Cotter grew up in downtown Toronto, Canada, behind a cemetery.

She studied English in university and went to drama school in London, England.

== Career ==
=== Editing years and non-fiction work ===
In 2004, Cotter’s first book was published: Toronto Between the Wars: Life in the City 1919–1939, by Firefly Books.

In 2007, Annick Press published Cotter’s first non-fiction book for children: Kids Who Rule: The Remarkable Lives of Five Child Monarchs. It was followed by Wonder Kids: The Remarkable Lives of Nine Child Prodigies, and Born to Write: The Remarkable Lives of Six Famous Authors. Annick Press also published Cotter’s first ghost-themed book, A World Full of Ghosts, in 2009.

=== Works of fiction and awards ===
Cotter’s breakout work of fiction was her novel The Swallow: A Ghost Story, published in 2014 by Tundra Books. It tells the story of two lonely girls who become friends over their mutual fascination with ghosts, and explores themes of childhood neglect, mental illness, and death. The Swallow won the 2015 Violet Downey Book Award and was a Silver Birch Honour Book as part of the Forest of Reading program in 2016. It was one of ten finalists for the Canadian Library Association Book of the Year for Children Award in 2015, receiving an honourable mention.

In 2017, Tundra Books published Cotter’s second novel, The Painting, which explores similar themes of ghosts, loss, and fractured family relationships. It won the Hackmatack Children’s Choice Award in 2019 and the Ann Connor Brimer Award for Children’s Literature at the Atlantic Book Awards & Festival in 2018.

Her next book, The Ghost Road, was published by Tundra Books in 2018. Set in Newfoundland, it tells the story of two girls who must break a family curse, and centres around issues of domestic violence and intergenerational trauma. It won the Bruneau Family Children’s/YA Literature Award at the Newfoundland and Labrador Book Awards in 2020.

Her fourth novel, The Dollhouse: A Ghost Story, was released in 2021. The Dollhouse was also released as an audiobook.

In addition to her novels, Cotter has written several picture books for children inspired by ghost stories from Newfoundland. Her first of these was The Ferryland Visitor: A Mysterious Tale, published in 2016 by Running the Goat Books & Broadsides, with artwork by acclaimed Newfoundland artist Gerald Squires.

Footsteps in Bay de Verde: A Mysterious Tale, illustrated by Jenny Dwyer, was published by Running the Goat Books & Broadsides in 2020, and won the Bruneau Family Children’s/YA Literature Award at the Newfoundland and Labrador Book Awards in 2022.

In 2020, Screech! Ghost Stories from Old Newfoundland, a collection of stories with art by Genevieve Simms, was published by Nimbus Publishing. It won the Hackmatack Children’s Choice Award in 2022.

Several of Cotter's books have been translated into Korean, German, and Russian.

=== Storytelling, workshops, and other pursuits ===
Cotter has developed several workshops and storytelling presentations for children, which she tours around schools across Canada. She has done an annual ghost story tour of Newfoundland schools since 2009.

Cotter founded her own publishing company, Baccalieu Books, under which she has published several collections of local ghost stories from children in Newfoundland schools.

She has been a guest on Danny Robins’ supernatural show for the BBC, Uncanny (radio series).

According to Cotter's website, her readers have unofficially dubbed her "Canada's Queen of Ghost Stories."

== Personal life ==
Charis Cotter lives and works in Western Bay, Newfoundland.

Her daughter, Zoe Cleland, is an actress and filmmaker.

== Bibliography ==
- Toronto Between the Wars: Life in the City 1919–1939 (Firefly Books, 2004)
- Kids Who Rule: The Remarkable Lives of Five Child Monarchs (Annick Press, 2007)
- Wonder Kids: The Remarkable Lives of Nine Child Prodigies (Annick Press, 2008)
- Born to Write: The Remarkable Lives of Six Famous Authors (Annick Press, 2009)
- A World Full of Ghosts (Annick Press, 2009)
- The Ghosts of Baccalieu (Baccalieu Books, 2013)
- The Swallow: A Ghost Story (Tundra Books, 2014)
- The Ferryland Visitor: A Mysterious Tale (Running the Goat Books & Broadsides, 2016)
- The Painting (Tundra Books, 2017)
- The Ghosts of Southwest Arm (Baccalieu Books, 2017)
- The Ghost Road (Tundra Books, 2018)
- Footsteps in Bay de Verde: A Mysterious Tale (Running the Goat Books & Broadsides, 2020)
- Screech! Ghost Stories from Old Newfoundland (Nimbus Publishing, 2020)
- The Dollhouse: A Ghost Story (Tundra Books, 2021)
