= Kate Locke =

Canadian author

Kate Locke is one of six pen names of a Canadian-born author, born in 1971, who also goes by the names Kate Cross, Kady Cross, Kathryn Smith, Kate Kessler and Kate McLaughlin depending on the genre she writes.

Smith's earliest novels were paranormal romances in an historical setting, written under the name Kathryn Smith. She then turned to writing steampunk for young adults as Kady Cross and steampunk romances as Kate Cross. The Immortal Empire series, set in an alternate steampunk London, was published as Kate Locke and categorised as urban fantasy. It is unclear which, if any, is her 'real' name (maiden or married), and which are fictional, however the copyright statement in all her books is assigned to Kathryn Smith.

She and her husband, Steve (no last name given), currently live in Connecticut.

== Books ==
=== as Kathryn Smith ===
- Elusive Passion (2001)
- A Game of Scandal (2002)
- The MacLaughlins Series
  - Anna and the Duke (2002)
  - Emily and the Scot (2002)
- Into Temptation (2003)
- In the Night (2003)
- For the First Time (2003)
- In Your Arms Again (2004)
- Still in my Heart (2005)
- A Seductive Offer (2009)
- When Seducing a Duke (2009)
- When Marrying a Scoundrel (2010)
- When Tempting a Rogue (2011)
- Brotherhood of the Blood
  - Be Mine Tonight (2006)
  - Night of the Huntress (2007)
  - Taken by the Night (2007)
  - Let the Night Begin (2008)
  - Night After Night (2009)
- Nightmare Chronicles
  - Before I Wake (2008)
  - Dark Side of Dawn (2009)

=== as Kady Cross ===
- The Strange Case of Finley Jayne (2011)
- The Steampunk Chronicles
  - The Girl in the Steel Corset (2012)
  - The Girl in the Clockwork Collar (2013)
  - The Girl with the Iron Touch (2013)
  - The Girl with the Windup Heart (2014)
- The Dark Discovery of Jack Dandy (2013)
- The Wild Adventures of Jasper Renn (2013)
- Vigilante (2017)

=== as Kate Cross ===
- The Clockwork Agents
  - Heart of Brass (2012)
  - Touch of Steel (2012)
  - Breath of Iron (2013)

=== as Kate Locke ===
- The Immortal Empire
  - God Save the Queen (2012)
  - The Queen is Dead (2013)
  - Long Live the Queen (2013)

=== as Kate Kessler ===
- Audrey Harte Series
  - It Takes One (2016)
  - Two can play (2016)
  - Three Strikes (2017)
- Dead Ringer (2018)

=== as Kate McLaughlin ===
- What Unbreakable Looks Like (2020)
- Daughter (2022)
- Pieces of Me (2023)
