= Don Aker =

Canadian writer (born 1955)

- Born: 1955 (age 70–71)
- Occupations: Writer; educator
- Writing career
- Genre: Young adult literature
- Notable works: Of Things Not Seen (1995); The First Stone (2003)
- Notable awards: Ann Connor Brimer Award (1996, 2004)
- Website: donaker.com

Don Aker (born 1955) is a Canadian writer and educator from Nova Scotia. His books won the Ann Connor Brimer Award in 1996 and 2004.

== Biography ==
Aker was born in 1955 in Windsor, Nova Scotia. He graduated from Acadia University with a Bachelor of Arts in 1975, a Bachelor of Education in 1977, and a Master of Education in 1991. Aker worked as a schoolteacher for 33 years, teaching English and creative writing at various levels.

His writing career began after attending a writing workshop at Martha's Vineyard in Massachusetts in 1988. His first short story, The Invitation, was published in 1990 and has been included in three anthologies. The story was later adapted into a screenplay, with $10,000 in funding provided by Telefilm Canada for its production. Aker's first novel, Of Things Not Seen, was published in 1995 and won the Ann Connor Brimer Award for Young Adult Literature in 1996. He received the same award again in 2004 for his novel The First Stone.

== Publications ==
- Aker, Don (1995). Of Things Not Seen. Toronto, ON: Stoddart Publishing. ISBN 978-0-7736-7435-6. OCLC 32090466.
- — (1997). Stranger at Bay. Toronto, ON: Stoddart Kids. ISBN 978-0-7736-7468-4. OCLC 37200418.
- — (2003). The First Stone. Toronto, ON: HarperTrophy. ISBN 978-1-4434-0142-5. OCLC 1015289028.
- — (2005). One on One. Toronto, ON: HarperTrophy. ISBN 978-0-0063-9531-7. OCLC 59136514.
- — (2009). The Space Between. Toronto, ON: HarperCollins Canada. ISBN 978-0-0063-8522-6. OCLC 1118318203.
- — (2011). The Fifth Rule. Toronto, ON: HarperTrophy. ISBN 978-1-5546-8863-0. OCLC 676774635.
- — (2014). Running on Empty. HarperCollins Canada: Toronto, ON. ISBN 978-1-4434-1440-1. OCLC 877888114.
- — (2015). Delusion Road. Toronto, ON: HarperTrophy. ISBN 978-1-4434-2416-5. OCLC 910566329.
- — (2015). Brothers in Arms: The Siege of Louisbourg. Toronto, ON: Scholastic Canada. ISBN 978-1-4431-1959-7. OCLC 902919475.
- — (2015). Always Even. Don Mills, ON: Pearson Education. ISBN 978-0-1338-5103-8. OCLC 1036204840.
- — (2017). Scars and Other Stories. Lawrencetown Beach, NS: Pottersfield Press. ISBN 978-1-9882-8605-1. OCLC 964368853.

== Recognition ==
- 1989: Winner of WFNS Atlantic Writing Competition
- 1990: Winner of WFNS Atlantic Writing Competition
- 1990: Winner of Canadian Living's National Literary Competition
- 1996: Ann Connor Brimer Award for Of Things Not Seen
- 2004: Ann Connor Brimer Award for The First Stone
- 2017: The First Stone is listed among 150 Books of Influence by the Nova Scotia Library Association.

== See also ==
- Literature of Nova Scotia
- List of writers from Nova Scotia
