= Eric Walters =

Canadian author (born 1957)

Eric Walters CM
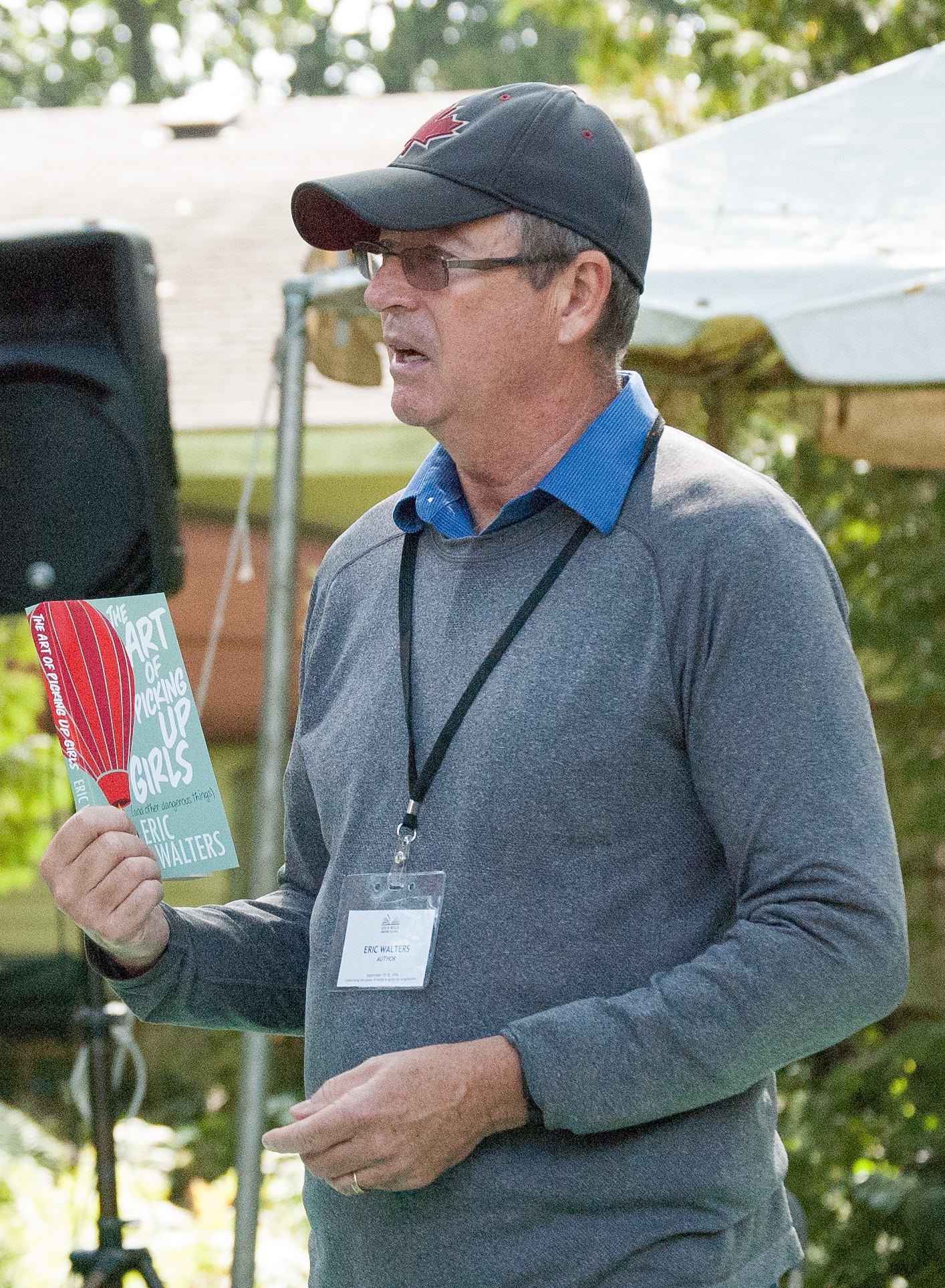
- Walters at the Eden Mills Writers' Festival in 2016
- Born: Eric Robert Walters; March 3, 1957 (age 69); Toronto, Ontario, Canada
- Occupation: Writer
- Known for: The Rule Of Three, Camp X, Shattered, Bifocal

Eric Robert Walters, CM (born March 3, 1957) is a Canadian author of young adult fiction and picture books. He has written over 130 books.

== Background ==
Walters was an elementary school teacher at Vista Heights Public School in Streetsville, Mississauga. In 1993, he was teaching a grade 5 class in which many of the students were reluctant readers and writers. To encourage them, Walters wrote his first novel, Stand Your Ground. The novel was set in the school and featured the names of many of his students. He has since written more than 70 novels for young adults.

He is a three-time winner of both the Ontario Library Association Silver Birch Award and Red Maple Award. His books have been translated and published in several other countries.

== Personal life ==
Eric Walters was born and raised in Toronto and resides in Guelph, Ontario, with his wife Anita. They have three adult children, Christina, Nicholas and Julia.

In April 2010, Walters walked across the Sahara before writing Just Deserts. With his son, he climbed Mount Kilimanjaro for Between Heaven and Earth. He played with tigers before writing Tiger by the Tail.

Walters and his wife founded the Creation of Hope, an organization providing care for orphans in the Mbooni district of Kenya.

== Awards ==
Walters's works have won or been nominated for the following awards:

Book	Award(s)
Stars	Silver Birch Award, 1997; Blue Heron Book Award, 1997; Children's Choice Award, Canadian Children's Book Centre
Trapped in Ice	Silver Birch Award, 1997; CBC Choice Award, 1997; Ruth Schwartz Award nomination, 1997
War of the Eagles	Ruth and Sylvia Schwartz Children’s Book Awards - Children’s Picture Book, 1999; Canadian Children's Book Centre Our Choice commendation, 1998; Canadian Library Association Book of the Year for Children Award Honour Book commendation, 1998
Diamonds in the Rough	CBC Choice Award, 1998; Red Cedar Award nomination, 1998
The Hydrofoil Mystery	Canadian Library Association Honour Book designation, 1998
Caged EagIes	Canadian Library Association Book of the Year for Children shortlist, 2001; UNESCO Prize for Children's and Young People's Literature in the Service of Tolerance nomination, 2003
Rebound	Red Maple Award, 2002; Snow Willow Award, 2002
The Bully Boys	CBC Choice Award, 2002; Red Maple Award shortlist, 2002
Camp X	Silver Birch Award, 2003; Arthur Ellis Award - Juvenile shortlist, 2003
Run	Torgi Award, 2004
We All Fall Down	Red Maple Winner, 2006
Shattered	White Pine Winner, 2006
Safe as Houses	Red Maple Winner, 2007
The Pole	National Outdoor Book Award (Children's Category), 2008
The King of Jam Sandwiches	Governor General's Award for English-language children's literature, 2020

== Published works ==
=== Fiction ===
- Stand Your Ground (Fitzhenry & Whiteside 1994)
- Stars (Fitzhenry & Whiteside 1996)
- Trapped in Ice (Penguin 1997)
- War of the Eagles (Orca 1998)
- Diamonds in the Rough (Fitzhenry & Whiteside 1998)
- The Hydrofoil Mystery (Penguin 1999)
- Caged Eagles (Orca 2000)
- Rebound (Stoddart 2000)
- The Bully Boys (Penguin 2000)
- Northern Exposures (HarperCollins 2001)
- Camp X (Penguin 2002)
- Ricky (HarperCollins 2002)
- Tiger Town (Dundurn 2003)
- Run (Penguin 2003)
- Overdrive (Orca 2004)
- Grind (Orca 2004)
- Death by Exposure (Dundurn 2004)
- Underdog (Orca 2004)
- I've Got An Idea (HarperCollins 2004)
- The True Story of Santa Claus (2005)
- Juice (Orca 2005)
- Elixir (Penguin 2005)
- Triple Threat (Orca 2005)
- Stuffed (Orca 2006)
- Laggan Lard Butts (Orca 2006)
- We All Fall Down (Doubleday 2006)
- Shattered (Penguin 2006)
- House Party (Orca 2007)
- Bifocal (Fitzhenry & Whiteside 2007)
- Safe as Houses (Doubleday 2007)
- Tiger Trap (Dundurn 2007)
- Sketches (Penguin 2007)
- Boot Camp (Orca 2007)
- The Falls (Penguin 2008)
- In A Flash (Orca 2008)
- When Elephants Fight (Orca, 2008)
- Voyageur (Penguin, 2008)
- The Pole (Penguin 2008)
- Splat! (Orca 2008)
- Alexandria of Africa (Doubleday 2008)
- Special Edward (Orca, 2009)
- Black & White (Penguin, 2009)
- Tell Me Why (Doubleday, 2009)
- Wounded (Penguin, 2009)
- United We Stand (Doubleday, 2009)
- Shell Shocked (Penguin, 2009)
- Wave (Doubleday, 2009)
- Beverly Hills Maasai (Doubleday, 2010)
- Branded (Orca, 2010)
- Trouble in Paradise (Penguin, 2010)
- Home Team (Orca, 2010)
- Fly Boy (Penguin, 2010)
- Shaken (Doubleday, January 2011)
- Catboy (Orca, September 2011)
- Just Deserts (Penguin, September 2011)
- Between Heaven and Earth (2012)
- The Matato Ride (Spring 2012)
- The Taming (Spring 2012) with Teresa Toten
- End of Days (Doubleday, September 2012)
- Power Play (Spring 2013)
- Tagged (Fall 2013)
- My Name is Blessing (Fall 2013)
- The Rule of Three (Farrar, Straus and Giroux, January 2014)
- Walking Home (Doubleday, 2014)
- Saving Sammy (Orca 2014)
- The Power of Three (Razorbill 2014)
- Sleeper (Orca 2014)
- Hope Springs (Tundra, September 2014)
- Regenesis (Doubleday Canada 2015)
- The Fight of Power (Razorbill 2015)
- The Will to Survive (Razorbill 2016)
- 90 Days of Different (Orca 2017)
- Always With You (Nimbus Publishing, 2019)
- The Boy Who Moved Christmas (Nimbus Publishing, 2020)
- Don't Stand So Close to Me (Orca 2020)
- The King of Jam Sandwiches (Orca 2020)
- Bear in the Family (Orca 2022)

=== Non-fiction ===
- Improve Your Child's Spelling 1 (1991) (with Norm Rippon)
- Improve Your Child's Spelling 2 (1993) (with Norm Rippon)
- When Elephants Fight (2008) (with Adrian Bradbury)
- Tell Me Why (2009)
- From the Heart of Africa: a Book of Wisdom (2018)
