= Orca Book Publishers =

Canadian book publisher

- Industry: Book publishing
- Founded: 1982
- Headquarters: Victoria, British Columbia, Canada
- Key people: Andrew Wooldridge, publisher Ruth Linka, associate publisher
- Website: www.orcabook.com

Orca Book Publishers is a Canadian company that produces books for children.

== Organization ==
Orca Book Publishers was founded in 1982 and is based in Victoria, British Columbia.

Orca primarily publishes children's literature, with a typical annual output of about 95 new titles. Andrew Wooldridge is the company's publisher, Ruth Linka is the associate publisher, and Sara Harvey is an editor.

== History ==
In 2019, Orca introduced a non-fiction line of books branded as Orca Issues.

Orca published Eric Walters' pandemic novel Don't Stand So Close To Me in 2020. The book was published within 41 days of Walter's pitching the idea to Orca.

15,000 of the company's books caught fire while on the MV Zim Kingston vessel near Victoria, British Columbia in October 2021.

In 2022, the company moved production of its books from China and Korea to Canada.

== Notable publications ==
- The Bonemender series
- The King of Jam Sandwiches
- The Lottery
- Weird Rules to Follow
