= Forest of Reading Red Maple Award =

Canadian literary award

Red Maple Award
- Description: Canadian fiction and non-fiction for grades 7–8
- Country: Canada
- Presented by: Ontario Library Association (Forest of Reading)
- Website: forestofreading.com

The Red Maple Award is an award in the Ontario Library Association (OLA) Forest of Reading Awards. The Red Maple Award celebrates fiction (since 1998) and non-fiction (every other year since 2005) Canadian books for grades 7–8 (ages 12–14) every year. Out of ten nominated books in each category students must read a minimum of five to vote for their favourite. The winner is chosen by the most popular book in all participating libraries, schools, groups, etc.

== History ==
Five years after the original Silver Birch Award was created an award for grades 7–9, the Red Maple Award was created. In 2005 a non-fiction subcategory of the Red Maple Award was created. It runs on all odd-numbered years.

So far, there have been 22 awards in fiction and 8 in non fiction.

Only seven authors have won the award more than once: Eric Walters (2001, 2007 Fiction, 2008, 2015 Fiction) with four, Susin Neilsen (2010, 2014, 2020) and Kenneth Oppel (2005 Fiction, 2006, 2012) with three each, and Gayle Friesen (1999, 2003), Wesley King (2013 Fiction, 2019 Fiction), Norah McClintock (2004, 2009 Fiction), and Andreas Schroeder (2005 Non-fiction, 2007 non-fiction) with two each. Friesen was the first to win the award twice, while Walters was the first to win three and four times.

Kenneth Oppel was the first to win back to back in 2005 and 2006, followed by Eric Walters in 2007 and 2008. Andreas Schroeder was the first to win back to back in non-fiction in 2005 and 2007.

Carol Matas was the first fiction winner, while Andreas Schroeder was the first non-fiction winner.

== Fiction honorees ==
=== 1990s ===
Award winners and finalists, 1998-1999
| Year | Author | Title | Result |
|---|---|---|---|
| 1998 | Carol Matas | After the War | Winner |
| 1998 | Don Aker | Stranger at Bay | Finalist |
| 1998 | Martha Attema | A Light in the Dunes | Finalist |
| 1998 | Maureen Bayless | No Fixed Address | Finalist |
| 1998 | Mitzi Dale | What's Tuesday? | Finalist |
| 1998 | Brian Doyle | Uncle Ronald | Finalist |
| 1998 | Sarah Ellis | Back of Beyond | Finalist |
| 1998 | Linda Holeman | Promise Song | Finalist |
| 1998 | Paul Kropp | Moonkid and Prometheus | Finalist |
| 1998 | Norah McClintock | The Body in the Basement | Finalist |
| 1999 | Gayle Friesen | Janey's Girl | Winner |
| 1999 | William Bell | Zack | Finalist |
| 1999 | Margaret Buffie | Angels Turn Their Backs | Finalist |
| 1999 | Linda Holeman | Mercy's Birds | Finalist |
| 1999 | Norah McClintock | Sins of the Father | Finalist |
| 1999 | Janet McNaughton | Make or Break Spring | Finalist |
| 1999 | Kit Pearson | Awake and Dreaming | Finalist |
| 1999 | Eric Walters | War of the Eagles | Finalist |
| 1999 | Mary Woodbury | Brad's Universe | Finalist |
| 1999 | Tim Wynne-Jones | Stephen Fair | Finalist |

=== 2000s ===
Award winners and finalists, 2000-2009
| Year | Author | Title | Result |
|---|---|---|---|
| 2000 | Anita Horrocks | What They Don't Know | Winner |
| 2000 | Lillian Boraks-Nemetz | The Sunflower Diary | Finalist |
| 2000 | Monica Hughes | The Story Box | Finalist |
| 2000 | Glen Huser | Touch of the Clown | Finalist |
| 2000 | Rukhsana Khan | Dahling, If You Luv Me Would You Please Smile | Finalist |
| 2000 | Norah McClintock | Password: Murder | Finalist |
| 2000 | Ishbel Moore | Daughter | Finalist |
| 2000 | Katherine Nolubitsky | Alone At Ninety Foot | Finalist |
| 2000 | Kenneth Oppel | Sunwing | Finalist |
| 2000 | Shane Peacock | The Mystery of Ireland's Eye | Finalist |
| 2001 | Eric Walters | Rebound | Winner |
| 2001 | Deborah Ellis | The Breadwinner | Finalist |
| 2001 | Gayle Friesen | Men of Stone | Finalist |
| 2001 | Linda Holeman | Raspberry House Blues | Finalist |
| 2001 | Monica Hughes | Storm Warning | Finalist |
| 2001 | Iain Lawrence | The Wreckers | Finalist |
| 2001 | Norah McClintock | Over the Edge | Finalist |
| 2001 | Sharon McKay | Charlie Wilcox | Finalist |
| 2001 | Janet McNaughton | The Secret Under My Skin | Finalist |
| 2001 | Tim Wynne-Jones | The Boy in the Burning House | Finalist |
| 2002 | Kathy Kacer | Clara's War | Winner |
| 2002 | William Bell | Stones | Finalist |
| 2002 | Karleen Bradford | Whisperings of Magic | Finalist |
| 2002 | Betty Fitzpatrick Dorion | Whose Side Are You On? | Finalist |
| 2002 | Troon Harrison | A Bushel of Light | Finalist |
| 2002 | Shane Peacock | Bone Beds of the Badlands | Finalist |
| 2002 | Arthur Slade | Dust | Finalist |
| 2002 | Ted Stenhouse | Across the Steel River | Finalist |
| 2002 | Maxine Trottier | By the Standing Stone | Finalist |
| 2002 | Eric Walters | Bully Boys | Finalist |
| 2003 | Gayle Friesen | Losing Forever | Winner |
| 2003 | Gillian Chan | The Carved Box | Finalist |
| 2003 | Barbara Haworth-Attard | Irish Chain | Finalist |
| 2003 | James Heneghan | Flood | Finalist |
| 2003 | J.C. Mills | The Goodfellow Chronicles: The Sacred Seal | Finalist |
| 2003 | Kenneth Oppel | Firewing | Finalist |
| 2003 | Valerie Sherrard | Out of the Ashes: A Shelby Belgarden Mystery | Finalist |
| 2003 | Sharon Stewart | City of the Dead | Finalist |
| 2003 | Diane Tullson | Saving Jasey | Finalist |
| 2003 | Budge Wilson | Fractures | Finalist |
| 2004 | Norah McClintock | Hit and Run | Winner |
| 2004 | Deborah Ellis | Parvana's Journey | Finalist |
| 2004 | Dennis Foon | The Dirt Eaters | Finalist |
| 2004 | Julie Johnston | In Spite of Killer Bees | Finalist |
| 2004 | Iain Lawrence | The Buccaneers | Finalist |
| 2004 | Bruce McBay and James Heneghan | Waiting for Sarah | Finalist |
| 2004 | Sharon McKay | Charlie Wilcox's Great War | Finalist |
| 2004 | Janet McNaughton | An Earthly Knight | Finalist |
| 2004 | Cora Taylor | On Wings of a Dragon | Finalist |
| 2004 | Eric Walters | Run | Finalist |
| 2005 | Kenneth Oppel | Airborn | Winner |
| 2005 | Deborah Ellis | The Heaven Shop | Finalist |
| 2005 | Glen Huser | Stitches | Finalist |
| 2005 | Dianne Linden | Peacekeepers | Finalist |
| 2005 | Clem Martini | The Mob | Finalist |
| 2005 | Norah McClintock | Dead and Gone | Finalist |
| 2005 | Sylvia McNicoll | A Different Kind of Beauty | Finalist |
| 2005 | Marsha Forchuk Skrypuch | Nobody's Child | Finalist |
| 2005 | Maxine Trottier | Sister to the Wolf | Finalist |
| 2005 | Maggie L. Wood | The Princess Pawn | Finalist |
| 2006 | Kenneth Oppel | Skybreaker | Winner |
| 2006 | Alan Cumyn | After Sylvia | Finalist |
| 2006 | Sheree Fitch | Gravesavers | Finalist |
| 2006 | Rachna Gilmore | Sower Of Tales | Finalist |
| 2006 | Marilyn Halvorson | Blood Brothers | Finalist |
| 2006 | Tom Henighan | Mercury Man | Finalist |
| 2006 | Rosa Jordan | Lost Goat Lane | Finalist |
| 2006 | Iain Lawrence | Convicts | Finalist |
| 2006 | Myra Paperny | Greenies | Finalist |
| 2006 | Richard Scrimger | From Charlie's Point of View | Finalist |
| 2007 | Eric Walters | We All Fall Down | Winner |
| 2007 | Hadley Dyer | Johnny Kellock Died Today | Finalist |
| 2007 | Gayle Friesen | The Isabel Factor | Finalist |
| 2007 | Bernice Thurman Hunter | The Girls They Left Behind | Finalist |
| 2007 | Gordon Korman | Born to Rock | Finalist |
| 2007 | Clem Martini | The Plague. Feather and Bone: The Crow Chronicles | Finalist |
| 2007 | Norah McClintock | Not a Trace Series: A Chloe and Levesque Mystery | Finalist |
| 2007 | Janet McNaughton | The Raintree Rebellion | Finalist |
| 2007 | Arthur Slade | Megiddo's Shadow | Finalist |
| 2007 | John Wilson | Red Goodwin | Finalist |
| 2008 | Eric Walters | Safe as Houses | Winner |
| 2008 | Henry T. Aubin | The Rise of the Golden Cobra | Finalist |
| 2008 | Christopher Dinsdale | Stolen Away | Finalist |
| 2008 | William Gilkerson | Pirate's Passage | Finalist |
| 2008 | Glen Huser | Skinnybones and the Wrinkle Queen | Finalist |
| 2008 | Iain Lawrence | Gemini Summer | Finalist |
| 2008 | Kenneth Oppel | Darkwing | Finalist |
| 2008 | Valerie Sherrard | Sarah's Legacy | Finalist |
| 2008 | Matthew Skelton | Endymion Spring | Finalist |
| 2008 | John Wilson | Where Soldiers Lie | Finalist |
| 2009 | Norah McClintock | Out of the Cold | Winner |
| 2009 | Jean Rae Baxter | Way Lies North | Finalist |
| 2009 | B.J. Bayle | Perilous Passage | Finalist |
| 2009 | Christopher Paul Curtis | Elijah of Buxton | Finalist |
| 2009 | James Heneghan | Payback | Finalist |
| 2009 | Iain Lawrence | The Castaways | Finalist |
| 2009 | Nicole Luiken | Frost | Finalist |
| 2009 | Kit Pearson | A Perfect Gentle Knight | Finalist |
| 2009 | Caroline Pignat | Egghead | Finalist |
| 2009 | Yvonne Prinz | Not Fair, Clare | Finalist |

=== 2010s ===
Award winners and finalists, 2010-2019
| Year | Author | Title | Result |
|---|---|---|---|
| 2010 | Susin Nielsen | Word Nerd | Winner |
| 2010 | Anne Laurel Carter | The Shepard's Granddaughter | Finalist |
| 2010 | Deborah Ellis | Lunch with Lenin and Other Stories | Finalist |
| 2010 | Hazel Hutchins | After | Finalist |
| 2010 | Sharon E. McKay | War Brothers | Finalist |
| 2010 | Kenneth Oppel | Starclimber | Finalist |
| 2010 | Caroline Pignat | Greener Grass | Finalist |
| 2010 | Philip Roy | Submarine Outlaw | Finalist |
| 2010 | René Schmidt | Leaving Fletchville | Finalist |
| 2010 | Max Turner | Night Runner | Finalist |
| 2011 | Vicki Grant | Not Suitable for Family Viewing | Winner |
| 2011 | Kelley Armstrong | The Summoning | Finalist |
| 2011 | William Bell | Only in the Movies | Finalist |
| 2011 | Marina Cohen | Ghost Ride | Finalist |
| 2011 | Afua Cooper | My Name is Henry Bibb | Finalist |
| 2011 | Terry Griggs | Nieve | Finalist |
| 2011 | Barbara Haworth-Attard | Haunted | Finalist |
| 2011 | Gordon Korman | POP | Finalist |
| 2011 | Y.S. Lee | The Agency: A Spy in the House | Finalist |
| 2011 | Eric Walters | Wounded | Finalist |
| 2012 | Kenneth Oppel | Half Brother | Winner |
| 2012 | William Bell | Fanatics | Finalist |
| 2012 | Patrick Bowman | Torn from Troy | Finalist |
| 2012 | Deborah Ellis | No Safe Place | Finalist |
| 2012 | Alyxandra Harvey | Haunting Violet | Finalist |
| 2012 | Jill MacLean | Home Truths | Finalist |
| 2012 | Sharon E. McKay and Rafal Gerszak | Thunder Over Kandahar | Finalist |
| 2012 | Susin Nielsen | Dear George Clooney Please Marry My Mom | Finalist |
| 2012 | Eric Walters | Fly Boy | Finalist |
| 2012 | Robert Paul Weston | Dust City | Finalist |
| 2013 | Wesley King | The Vindico | Winner |
| 2013 | Sylvia McNicoll | crush. candy. corpse. | Finalist |
| 2013 | Mahtab Narsimhan | The Tiffin | Finalist |
| 2013 | Riel Nason | The Town That Drowned | Finalist |
| 2013 | Kenneth Oppel | This Dark Endeavour | Finalist |
| 2013 | Shane Peacock | The Dragon Turn | Finalist |
| 2013 | Valerie Sherrard | Testify | Finalist |
| 2013 | Allison Van Diepen | The Vampire Stalker | Finalist |
| 2013 | Eric Walters | End of Days | Finalist |
| 2013 | Pam Withers | First Descent | Finalist |
| 2014 | Susin Nielsen | The Reluctant Journal of Henry K. Larsen | Winner |
| 2014 | K. L. Armstrong and M. A. Marr | Loki's Wolves: The Blackwell Pages | Finalist |
| 2014 | Sigmund Brouwer | Devil's Pass | Finalist |
| 2014 | Cynthia d'Entremont | Oak Island Revenge | Finalist |
| 2014 | Deborah Ellis | My Name is Parvana | Finalist |
| 2014 | Joanne Levy | Small Medium at Large | Finalist |
| 2014 | Kenneth Oppel | Such Wicked Intent | Finalist |
| 2014 | Valerie Sherrard | Counting Back from Nine | Finalist |
| 2014 | Ted Staunton | Jump Cut | Finalist |
| 2014 | Eric Walters | Between Heaven and Earth | Finalist |
| 2015 | Eric Walters | Rule of Three | Winner |
| 2015 | Sigmund Brouwer | Dead Man's Switch | Finalist |
| 2015 | Philippa Dowdling | The Strange Gift of Gwendolyn Golden | Finalist |
| 2015 | Sarah Ellis | Outside In | Finalist |
| 2015 | Jacqueline Guest | The Comic Book War | Finalist |
| 2015 | Jess Keating | How to Outrun a Crocodile When Your Shoes Are Untied | Finalist |
| 2015 | Kenneth Oppel | The Boundless | Finalist |
| 2015 | Caroline Pignat | Unspeakable | Finalist |
| 2015 | Richard Scrimger | Zomboy | Finalist |
| 2015 | Vikki VanSickle | Summer Days, Starry Nights | Finalist |
| 2016 | Allan Stratton | The Dogs | Winner |
| 2016 | Karen Bass | Uncertain Soldier | Finalist |
| 2016 | Deborah Ellis | The Cat at the Wall | Finalist |
| 2016 | Susan Juby | The Truth Commission | Finalist |
| 2016 | Sharon E. McKay | Prison Boy | Finalist |
| 2016 | Lorna Schultz Nicholson | Fragile Bones: Harrison and Anna | Finalist |
| 2016 | Susin Nielsen | We Are All Made of Molecules | Finalist |
| 2016 | Caroline Pignat | The Gospel Truth | Finalist |
| 2016 | Emil Sher and David Wyman | Young Man with Camera: A Novel with Photographs | Finalist |
| 2016 | Eric Walters | Walking Home | Finalist |
| 2017 | Caroline Pignat | Shooter | Winner |
| 2017 | Kelley Armstrong | The Unquiet Past | Finalist |
| 2017 | Karen Bass | The Hill | Finalist |
| 2017 | Lorna Schultz Nicholson | Born With: Erika and Gianni | Finalist |
| 2017 | Richard Scrimger | Lucky Jonah | Finalist |
| 2017 | Arthur Slade | Flickers | Finalist |
| 2017 | Kevin Sylvester | MiNRS | Finalist |
| 2017 | Teresa Toten | Shattered Glass | Finalist |
| 2017 | Stephanie Tromly | Trouble is a Friend of Mine | Finalist |
| 2017 | Frank Viva | Sea Change | Finalist |
| 2018 | Vikki VanSickle | The Winnowing | Winner |
| 2018 | Jennifer Dance | Hawk | Finalist |
| 2018 | Gord Downie and Jeff Lemire | Secret Path | Finalist |
| 2018 | Vicki Grant | Short for Chameleon | Finalist |
| 2018 | Wesley King | Laura Monster Crusher | Finalist |
| 2018 | Lorna Schultz Nicholson | Bent Not Broken: Madeline and Justin | Finalist |
| 2018 | David A. Pulsen | And Then the Sky Exploded | Finalist |
| 2018 | David Skuy | Run | Finalist |
| 2018 | Allan Stratton | The Way Back Home | Finalist |
| 2018 | Joel A. Sutherland | Summer's End | Finalist |
| 2019 | Wesley King | A World Below | Winner |
| 2019 | Kristen Ciccarelli | The Last Namsara | Finalist |
| 2019 | E. Latimer | The Strange and Deadly Portraits of Bryony Gray | Finalist |
| 2019 | Jean Mills | Skating Over Thin Ice | Finalist |
| 2019 | Colleen Nelson | Sadia | Finalist |
| 2019 | Lorna Schultz Nicholson | A Time to Run: Stuart & Sam | Finalist |
| 2019 | Kevin Sands | The Assassin's Curse | Finalist |
| 2019 | Marsha Forchuk Skrypuch | Don't Tell the Enemy | Finalist |
| 2019 | Eric Walters | Fourth Dimension | Finalist |
| 2019 | Pam Withers | Tracker's Canyon | Finalist |

=== 2020s ===
Award winners and finalists, 2020-present
| Year | Author | Title | Result |
|---|---|---|---|
| 2020 | Susin Nielsen | No Fixed Address | Winner |
| 2020 | Svetlana Chmakova | Crush | Finalist |
| 2020 | Natasha Deen | In the Key of Nira Ghandi | Finalist |
| 2020 | Gordon Korman | The Unteachables | Finalist |
| 2020 | Kyo Maclear and Byron Eggenschwiler | Operatic | Finalist |
| 2020 | Kevin Sands | Call of the Wraith | Finalist |
| 2020 | Tasha Spillett and Natasha Donovan | Surviving the City | Finalist |
| 2020 | Nhung N. Tran-Davies | A Grain of Rice | Finalist |
| 2020 | Laura E. Weymouth | The Light Between Worlds | Finalist |
| 2020 | Pam Withers | Stowaway | Finalist |
| 2021 | Kenneth Oppel | Bloom | Winner |
| 2021 | Heather Camlot | The Other Side | Finalist |
| 2021 | Brianna Jonnie, Nahanni Shingoose, and Neal Shannacappo | If I Go Missing | Finalist |
| 2021 | Christina Killbourne | Safe Harbour | Finalist |
| 2021 | Wesley King | Sara and the Search for Normal | Finalist |
| 2021 | Jamal Saeed and Sharon E. McKay | Yara's Spring | Finalist |
| 2021 | Valerie Sherrard | The Rise and Fall of Derek Cowell | Finalist |
| 2021 | Arthur Slade | Dragon Assassin | Finalist |
| 2021 | Eric Walters and Kathy Kacer | Broken Strings | Finalist |
| 2021 | Laura E. Weymouth | A Treason of Thorns | Finalist |
| 2022 | Eric Walters | The King of Jam Sandwiches | Winner |
| 2022 | Philippa Dowding | Firefly | Finalist |
| 2022 | Regina M. Hansen | The Coming Storm | Finalist |
| 2022 | Gordon Korman | Linked | Finalist |
| 2022 | Patricia Miller-Schroeder | Sisters of the Wolf | Finalist |
| 2022 | Sarena Nanua and Sasha Nanua | Sisters of the Snake | Finalist |
| 2022 | Susin Nielsen | Tremendous Things | Finalist |
| 2022 | Valerie Sherrard | Birdspell | Finalist |
| 2022 | Tasha Spillett and Natasha Donovan | From the Roots Up | Finalist |
| 2022 | Heather Stemp | Under Amelia's Wing | Finalist |
2023
| 2023 | Kevin Sands | Children of the Fox | Winner |
| 2023 | Leisl Adams | Batter Royale | Finalist |
| 2023 | Paul Coccia and Eric Walters | On the Line | Finalist |
| 2023 | Kathy Kacer | Under the Iron Bridge | Finalist |
| 2023 | Wab Kinew | Walking in Two Worlds | Finalist |
| 2023 | Joanne Levy | Sorry for Your Loss | Finalist |
| 2023 | Chad Lucas | Let the Monster Out | Finalist |
| 2023 | Meghan McIsaac | The Bear House | Finalist |
| 2023 | Teresa Toten | Eight Days | Finalist |
| 2023 | Lori Weber | The Ribbon Leaf | Finalist |
2024
| 2024 | Gordon Korman | The Fort | Winner |
| 2024 | Erin Bow | Simon Sort of Says | Finalist |
| 2024 | Cherie Dimaline | Into the Bright Open: A Secret Garden Remix | Finalist |
| 2024 | Melanie Florence and Richard Scrimger | Autumn Bird and the Runaway | Finalist |
| 2024 | Lawrence Hill | Beatrice and Croc Harry | Finalist |
| 2024 | E.K. Johnston | Dungeons & Dragons: Honor Among Thieves: The Druid's Call | Finalist |
| 2024 | Suri Rosen | A Bucket of Stars | Finalist |
| 2024 | Kevin Sands | Seekers of the Fox: Thieves of Shadow | Finalist |
| 2024 | Nadia Shammas and Sara Alfageeh | Squire | Finalist |
| 2024 | Andrew Varga | The Last Saxon King: A Jump in Time Novel | Finalist |
| 2025 | Deborah Ellis | The Outsmarters | Finalist |
| 2025 | Wanda John-Kehewin | Hopeless in Hope | Finalist |
| 2025 | Christina Kilbourne | 40 Days in Hicksville | Finalist |
| 2025 | Thọ Phạm and Sandra McTavish | The Cricket War | Finalist |
| 2025 | Jael Richardson | Today I Am | Finalist |
| 2025 | Jeff Szpirglas | Book of Screams 01 | Finalist |
| 2025 | Wali Shah and Eric Walters | Call me Al | Finalist |
| 2025 | Brian Slattery | Escape to Ponti | Finalist |
| 2025 | Heather Smith (author) | Tig | Finalist |
| 2025 | Giselle Vriesen | Why We Play with Fire | Finalist |

== Non-fiction winners ==
Award winners and finalists
| Year | Author | Title |
|---|---|---|
| 2005 | Andreas Schroeder | Scams! |
| 2007 | Andreas Schroeder | Thieves!: Ten Stories of Surprising Heists, Comical Capers and Daring Escapades |
| 2009 | Elizabeth MacLeod | Royal Murder |
| 2011 | Mariatu Kamara | Bite of the Mango |
| 2013 | Bill Swan | Real Justice: Fourteen and Sentenced to Death |
| 2015 | Rona Arato | The Last Train: A Holocaust Story |
| 2017 | Michel Chikwanine, Jessica Dee Humphreys, and Claudia Dávila | Child Soldier: When Boys and Girls Are Used in War |
| 2019 | Sungju Lee and Susan McClelland | Every Falling Star: The True Story of How I Survived and Escaped North Korea |
