= John Spray Mystery Award =

Canadian literary award (2012–2016)

The John Spray Mystery Award was an annual Canadian literary award presented to children's mystery books written by Canadian authors. Presented from 2011 to 2020, the award was launched by the Canadian Children's Book Centre and sponsored by John Spray. Winners received $5,000 CAD.

== Recipients ==
Award winners and finalists
Year	Title	Author	Result	Ref.
2011	Y. S. Lee	A Spy in the House	Winner	
2011	Allan Stratton	Borderline	Finalist	
2011	Jan Markley	Dead Bird Through the Cat Door	Finalist	
2011	Marty Chan	The Mystery of the Cyber Bully	Finalist	
2011	Norah McClintock	Victim Rights	Finalist	
2012	Rob Mills	Charlie's Key	Winner	
2012	Ellen Schwartz	The Case of the Missing Deed	Finalist	
2012	Shane Peacock	The Dragon Turn	Finalist	
2012	Edeet Ravel	Held	Finalist	
2012	Deborah Ellis	True Blue	Finalist	
2013	Elizabeth Stewart	The Lynching of Louie Sam	Winner	
2013	Shane Peacock	Becoming Holmes	Finalist	
2013	Michael Betcherman	Breakaway	Finalist	
2013	Sigmund Brouwer	Devil's Pass	Finalist	
2013	Kevin Sylvester	Neil Flambé and the Tokyo Treasure	Finalist	
2014	Ted Staunton	Who I'm Not	Winner	
2014	James Leck	The Further Adventures of Jack Lime	Finalist	
2014	Rachelle Delaney	The Metro Dogs of Moscow	Finalist	
2014	Jessica Scott Kerrin	The Spotted Dog Last Seen	Finalist	
2014	Elizabeth Wennick	Whatever Doesn't Kill You	Finalist	
2015	William Bell	Julian	Winner	
2015	Norah McClintock	About That Night	Finalist	
2015	Sigmund Brouwer	Dead Man's Switch	Finalist	
2015	Cary Fagan	The Show to End All Shows	Finalist	
2015	S. J. Laidlaw	The Voice Inside My Head	Finalist	
2016	Kevin Sands	The Blackthorn Key	Winner	
2016	Don Aker	Delusion Road	Finalist	
2016	Kelley Armstrong	The Masked Truth	Finalist	
2016	Gordon Korman	Masterminds	Finalist	
2016	Jordan Stratford	The Case of the Missing Moonstone	Finalist	
2017	Caroline Pignat	Shooter	Winner	
2017	Shane Peacock	The Dark Missions of Edgar Brim	Finalist	
2017	Casey Lyall	Howard Wallace, P.I.	Finalist	
2017	Moira Young	The Road to Ever After	Finalist	
2017	Jonathan Auxier	Sophie Quire and the Last Storyguard	Finalist	
2018	Eileen Cook	The Hanging Girl	Winner	
2018	Kevin Sands	The Assassin's Curse	Finalist	
2018	Sarah N. Harvey and Robin Stevenson	Blood on the Beach	Finalist	
2018	Warren Kinsella	Recipe for Hate	Finalist	
2018	Liam O'Donnell, illustrated by Mike Deas	The Case of the Missing Mage	Finalist	
2019	Courtney Summers	Sadie	Winner	
2019	Kelley Armstrong	Aftermath	Finalist	
2019	Kevin Sands	Call of the Wraith	Finalist	
2019	Liam O'Donnell, illustrated by Mike Deas	The Case of the Firebane Folly	Finalist	
2019	Angie Counios and David Gane	Wolfe in Shepherd's Clothing	Finalist	
2020	Tim Wynne-Jones	The Starlight Claim	Winner	
2020	Shamim Sarif	The Athena Protocol	Finalist	
2020	Tom Ryan	Keep This to Yourself	Finalist	
2020	Julia Nobel	The Mystery of Black Hollow Lane	Finalist	
2020	Kelly Powell	Song from the Deep	Finalist	
