= Double dribble (disambiguation) =

A double dribble is an illegal move in basketball.

Double dribble may also refer to:

- Double Dribble (video game), a 1986 arcade game by Konami
  - Double Dribble: The Playoff Edition, a 1994 sequel
- Double Dribble (film), a 1946 Disney theatrical cartoon short
- Double Dribble, a 1992 album by Miles Donahue produced by Timeless Records
- Double Dribble, a 1999 book by Canadian Sylvia McNicoll
- “Double Dribble”, a short story by George Alec Effinger in the 1990 anthology The Further Adventures of The Joker
- “Double Dribble”, a 2017 single by Wiwek
- The Double Dribble, a former show produced by American entertainment website Double Toasted
