= Ted Staunton =

Canadian writer

Ted Staunton (born March 29, 1956) is a Canadian author and teacher, best known for his children's books and numerous series. He has published nearly sixty titles.

Puddleman, his first major work, starting life as an assignment in university, but was later illustrated by internationally recognized artist Brenda Clark. Some of Staunton's titles include the Maggie and Cyril series, What Blows Up, and award-winning Who I'm Not. He also teaches a course, "Writing Children's Fiction", through George Brown College, Toronto.

Staunton lives with his family in Port Hope, Ontario. Many of his stories take place in Port Hope.

== Written works ==
=== Series ===
Working across multiple publishers, Staunton has written and developed, and contributed to, several series. He wrote Jump Cut, Coda, and Speed, contributing to the over-arching SEVEN series, published by Orca Books. For Scholastic Canada, Staunton contributed What Blows Up, part of The Almost Epic Squad. In the 1980s, he published several of his own children's picture books, including his first, Puddleman, plus Taking Care of Crumley, Harry and Clare's Amazing Staycation. Other series he has created include Maggie and Cyril for middle-schoolers, and Morgan for young children.

=== Illustrators ===
Staunton has worked with numerous illustrators. He worked with Britt Wilson, the illustrator for The Almost Epic Squad series. For Puddleman, Staunton worked with local illustrator Brenda Clark, widely known for her work on the Franklin the Turtle series, (which was migrated to several television series). Taking Care of Crumley was illustrated by Tina Holdcroft. Holdcroft has illustrated over thirty children's books, and seventy adult books.

=== Collaborations ===
Quill & Quire magazine reported on Scholastic Canada bringing together four veterans of children's literature: Ted Staunton, Kevin Sylvester, Richard Scrimger, and Lesley Livingston. They produced a four-book progressing series, The Almost Epic Squad, about different-aged, different-grade school kids who develop strange superpowers. The first in the series was published in Autumn 2018, with Staunton writing the second in the series, What Blows Up, published early 2019. What Blows Up follows Gary, who has developed telekinetic powers.

For Orca Books, Staunton contributed to the SEVEN series, later a series of sequels, still later a series of prequels. With Staunton, contributors to the three SEVEN series include John Wilson, Richard Scrimger, Norah McClintock, Sigmund Brouwer and Shane Peacock.

=== COVID-19 ===
In March 2020, during the beginning of COVID-19 pandemic, Quill & Quire magazine published an article, "What – and how – to read with your child during a crisis". Within this, author Shanda Deziel recommended 14 books (and an additional free e-book donated by Orca Books) to help parents effectively aid their children during school closures in regions under lockdown. Staunton's book Harry and Clare's Amazing Staycation from 2017 was one of the recommendations.

== Awards ==
In 2013, Staunton wrote Who I'm Not. This follows the story of a teenager who has lost his name, is trained by a con-artist to help run con schemes. It was inspired by the story of Frédéric Bourdin, as reported in The New Yorker.

Book reviewer Cecile Sune notes, "If it wasn't based on a true story, I would have thought that the book was too far-fetched and would have dismissed it as too unbelievable. As it is, it turns out to be a fast-paced and highly entertaining story. However, I thought that Ted Staunton followed Frédéric Bourdin's real life story a little bit too closely, and it somewhat spoiled the book for me." She adds, "The ending is quite different from what happened in real life though, which is good."

In 2014, Quill & Quire magazine announced Who I'm Not as the recipient of The John Spray Mystery Award.

== Bibliography ==
Sources: Goodreads, Ted Staunton Books

=== Young children ===
==== Picture books ====
1. Puddleman (1983)
2. Taking Care of Crumley (1984)
3. Simon's Surprise (1986)
4. Miss Fishley Afloat (1990)
5. Anna Takes Charge (1993)
6. Harry and Clare's Amazing Staycation (2017)
7. A Friends for Real (2020)

==== Morgan series ====
1. Morgan Makes Magic (1997)
2. Morgan and the Money (1998)
3. Morgan's Secret (2000)
4. Great Play, Morgan! (2001)
5. Morgan's Birthday (2002)
6. Morgan's Pet Plot (2003)
7. Morgan Makes a Splash (2004)
8. Morgan Makes a Deal (2005)
9. Super Move, Morgan! (2006)
10. Campfire Morgan (2007)
11. Pucker Up, Morgan (2008)
12. Daredevil Morgan (2009)
13. Music by Morgan (2010)
14. Morgan and the Dune Racer (2011)
15. Morgan Gets Cracking (2012)
16. Morgan on Ice (2013)
17. Morgan's Got Game (2014)
18. Morgan the Brave (2018)

=== Middle grades ===
==== Monkey Mountain series ====
1. Two False Moves (2002)
2. Monkey Mountain Monster (2002)
3. Forgive Us Our Travises (2002)
4. Princess (2002)
5. Second Banana (2002)
6. Stinky (2002)
7. Trouble with Girls (2002)

==== Almost Epic series ====
1. The Almost Epic Squad: What Blows Up (2019)

==== Mystery ====
1. Bounced (2017)

=== Young Adult ===
==== Maggie & Cyril series ====
1. Greenapple Street Blues (The Greenapple Street Geniuses, #2) (1987)
2. Mushmouth and the Marvel (1988)
3. Great Minds Think Alike (1989)
4. Maggie And Me (1990)
5. Taking the Long Way Home (1992)

==== Hope Springs series ====
1. Hope Springs a Leak (2002)
2. Sounding Off (2004)
3. Acting Up (2010)

==== Dreadful Truth series ====
1. The Dreadful Truth: Confederation (Dreadful Truth Series) (2004)
2. The Dreadful Truth: Building The Railway (2005)
3. The Dreadful Truth: Canadian Crime (2006)
4. The Dreadful Truth: The Northwest Passage (2007)
5. The Dreadful Truth: Gold Rush (2008)

==== Musician series ====
1. Power Chord (2011)
2. Ace's Basement (2013)

==== SEVEN series ====
1. Jump Cut (Spencer #1; Seven #3) (2012)
2. Coda (Spencer #2) (2014)
3. Speed (Spencer #0.5) (2019)

==== Film School series ====
1. Scène Finale (2017)
2. Pov (2017)

==== Mystery ====
1. Who I'm Not (2013)

==== Sports ====
1. Hustle (2014)

==== History for Kids ====
1. It Seemed Like a Good Idea... Canadian Feats, Facts and Flubs (2020)
