= Kevin Sands =

Canadian children's author

Kevin Sands is a Canadian children's author from Ontario.

Sands began his career teaching math and physics to high school students. He published his debut novel, The Blackthorn Key, with Simon & Schuster in 2015. This began a series followed by a Mark of the Plague (2016), The Assassin's Curse (2017), Call of the Wraith (2018), The Traitor's Blade (2022), and The Raven's Revenge (2024). This book series takes place in 17th-century England/Europe. The main character is Christopher Rowe, and his friends are Tom Bailey and Sally Deschamps. Together, they solve mysteries and stop malicious plots against their king, King Charles II.

Following The Blackthorn Key series, Sands began the Thieves of Shadow series, including Children of the Fox (2021), Seekers of the Fox (2022), and Champions of the Fox (2023). The Chicago Public Library and CBC Books included Children of the Fox on their lists of the best books of 2021.

== Awards ==
The Blackthorn Key (2015), Mark of the Plague (2016), The Assassin's Curse (2017), and Call of the Wraith (2018) are Junior Library Guild books. The Chicago Public Library, and Kirkus Reviews named The Blackthorn Key among the best middle grade books of 2015. The following year, Bank Street College of Education included it on their list of the best historical fiction for children ages 9 to 12, and the Association for Library Service to Children included on their list of Notable Children's Books for Middle Readers. Bank Street College of Education also included Mark of the Plague on their 2017 list of the best historical fiction for children ages 9 to 12.

The Chicago Public Library and CBC Books included Children of the Fox on their lists of the best books of 2021.

Awards for Sands's writing
Year	Work	Award	Result	Ref.
2015	The Blackthorn Key	Cybils Award for Middle Grade Fiction	Winner	
2016	The Blackthorn Key	Crime Writers of Canada Awards of Excellence: Best Juvenile or Young Adult Crime Book	Finalist	
2016	The Blackthorn Key	E. B. White Read Aloud Award for Middle Readers	Honor	
2016	The Blackthorn Key	Edgar Allan Poe Award for Best Juvenile	Finalist	
2016	The Blackthorn Key	John Spray Mystery Award	Winner	
2016	The Blackthorn Key	Violet Downey Book Award	Finalist	
2017	The Blackthorn Key	Silver Birch Award	Finalist	
2017	Mark of the Plague	Geoffrey Bilson Award	Winner	
2018	The Assassin’s Curse	Edgar Allan Poe Award for Best Juvenile	Finalist	
2018	The Assassin’s Curse	Geoffrey Bilson Award	Winner	
2018	The Assassin’s Curse	John Spray Mystery Award	Finalist	
2019	Call of the Wraith	Crime Writers of Canada Awards of Excellence: Best Juvenile or Young Adult Crime Book	Finalist	
2019	Call of the Wraith	John Spray Mystery Award	Finalist	
2020	Call of the Wraith	Forest of Reading Red Maple Award	Finalist	
2022	Children of the Fox	Ruth & Sylvia Schwartz Children's Book Award for Young Adult/Middle Readers	Finalist	
2022	The Traitor's Blade	Crime Writers of Canada Awards of Excellence: Best Juvenile or Young Adult Crime Book	Winner	
2024	Seekers of the Fox	Forest of Reading Red Maple Award	Finalist	
2024	The Raven's Revenge	Ruth & Sylvia Schwartz Children's Book Award for Young Adult/Middle Readers	Winner	
2024	Champions of the Fox	Crime Writers of Canada Awards of Excellence: Best Juvenile or Young Adult Crime Book	Finalist	

== Publications ==
=== The Blackthorn Key series ===
1. The Blackthorn Key. New York: Aladdin. 2015. ISBN 978-1-4814-4651-8.
2. Mark of the Plague. New York: Aladdin. 2016. ISBN 978-1-4814-4674-7.
3. The Assassin's Curse. New York: Aladdin. 2017. ISBN 978-1-5344-0523-3.
4. Call of the Wraith. New York: Aladdin. 2018. ISBN 978-1-534-42848-5.
5. The Traitor's Blade. New York: Aladdin. 2022. ISBN 978-1-534-48457-3.
6. The Raven's Revenge. New York: Aladdin. 2024. ISBN 978-1-534-48460-3.

=== Thieves of Shadow series ===
1. Children of the Fox. Viking. 2021. ISBN 978-0-593-32751-7.
2. Seekers of the Fox. Viking. 2022. ISBN 978-0-593-32754-8.
3. Champions of the Fox. Viking. 2023. ISBN 978-0-593-62095-3.
