= Bill Swan (writer) =

Canadian children's author

- Born: January 25, 1939 (age 87); Bright, Ontario, Canada
- Occupations: Author, journalist, educator
- Writing career
- Genre: Children's Literature

Bill Swan (born January 25, 1939) is a Canadian children's author living in Courtice, Ontario. He teaches writing-related courses online and works as a communications consultant. Bill Swan was college administrator and journalism professor at Durham College in Oshawa, Ontario. He was a newspaper editor and columnist. He spent one year at Royal Military College of Canada in Kingston, Ontario.

In 2013, Real Justice (2012) won the Forest of Reading Red Maple Award and was a finalist for the Norma Fleck Award.

== Works ==
- Fast Finish. Lorimer. 1998. ISBN 978-1-55028-640-3.
- Mud Run. Lorimer. 2003. ISBN 978-1-55028-786-8. OCLC 51921884.
- Off Track. Lorimer. 2003. ISBN 978-1-55028-806-3. OCLC 52705369.
- Corner Kick. Lorimer. 2004. ISBN 978-1-55028-817-9. OCLC 54066333.
- Deflection!. James Lorimer & Company. 2005. ISBN 978-1-55028-852-0. OCLC 56319651.
- Mud Happens. Lorimer. 2005. ISBN 978-1-55028-899-5. OCLC 61216737.
- Road Rage. Lorimer. 2006. ISBN 978-1-55028-917-6.
- The Enforcer. Lorimer. 2007. ISBN 978-1-55028-979-4.
- Man-to-Man. Lorimer. 2009. ISBN 978-1-55277-442-7.
- Real Justice: Fourteen and Sentenced to Death - The Story of Steven Truscott. Lorimer. 2012. ISBN 978-1-4594-0075-7.
