= Pam Withers =

American-born Canadian author

- Born: Pam Miller; July 31, 1956 (age 69) Milwaukee, Wisconsin, United States
- Education: Beloit College (B.A.)
- Spouse: Stephen G. Withers (m. 1985)
- Children: 1

Pam Withers (born July 31, 1956) is an American-born Canadian author of outdoor adventure and sports novels for young adults as well as being a former journalist and editor. She is a former whitewater kayak racer and instructor and whitewater raft guide.

== Biography ==
Withers was born July 31, 1956, in Milwaukee to Richard S. and Anita E. Miller. She received a Bachelor of Arts from Beloit College.

In the 1970s and early 1980s, Withers served as associate editor for Runners World and Adventure Travel before becoming a reporter and copy editor for various news outlets in Seattle and New York City.

She married Stephen G. Withers, a professor of chemistry, in June 1985 and has one child. They presently live in Vancouver and travel extensively in Canada and the United States on speaking engagements.

== Awards ==
Three of Withers's books are Junior Library Guild selections: First Descent (2011), Andreo's Race (2015), and Mountain Runaways (2022).

Awards for Wither's writing
Year	Title	Award	Result	Ref.
2011	First Descent	INDIES Award for Young Adult Fiction (Children's)	Silver	
2011	First Descent	OLA Best Bets for Children and Young Adult	Honourable Mention	
2012	First Descent	Silver Nautilus Award	Winner	
2013	First Descent	Forest of Reading Red Maple Award	Finalist	
2019	Tracker's Canyon	Forest of Reading Red Maple Award	Finalist	
2020	Stowaway	Forest of Reading Red Maple Award	Finalist	
2020	Stowaway	Chocolate Lily Award	Nominee	
2021	Parkour Club	Silver Nautilus Award	Silver	
2024	Mountain Runaways	Chocolate Lily Award	Nominee	

== Publications ==
- Breathless (2005)
- Camp Wild (2005)
- Daredevil Club (2006)
- Going Vertical: The Life of an Extreme Kayaker (with Tao Berman) (2008)
- First Descent (2011)
- Jumpstarting Boys: How to Help Your Underachiever (with Cynthia Gill) (2013)
- Paintball Island (2014)
- Andreo's Race (2015)
- Bungee Jump (2016)
- Tracker's Canyon (2017)
- Stowaway (2018)
- The Parkour Club (2020)
- Drone Chase (2021)
- Mountain Runaways (2022)
- Cave-In (2024)

=== Take It to the Xtreme ===
- Raging River (2003)
- Peak Survival (2004)
- Adrenalin Ride (2005)
- Skater Stuntboys (2005)
- Surf Zone (2005)
- Vertical Limits (2005)
- Dirtbike Daredevils (2006)
- BMX Tunnel Run (2007)
- Wake's Edge (2007)
- Mountainboard Maniacs (2008)
