= Gayle Friesen =

Canadian author of young adult novels (born 1960)

- Born: September 18, 1960 (age 65)
- Education: University of British Columbia
- Occupation: Author
- Writing career
- Genre: Young adult fiction

Gayle Friesen (born September 18, 1960) is a Canadian author of young adult novels. She was raised in Chilliwack, British Columbia. She has a Bachelor of Arts degree from the University of British Columbia. She is married with two children.

Friesen's first novel Janey's Girl (1998) was critically acclaimed, winning the Canadian Library Association's Young Adult Book Award and the Red Maple Reading Award. It was also nominated for the Governor General's Literary Award. She has written four other novels for young adults.

== Awards and honours ==
Two of Friesen's books are Junior Library Guild selections: Janey’s Girl (1999) and The Isabel Factor (2006).

Awards for Friesen's writing
Year	Title	Award	Result	Ref.
1998	Janey's Girl	Governor General's Award for English-Language Children's Literature	Finalist	
1999	Janey's Girl	Canadian Library Association Young Adult Book Award	Winner	
1999	Janey's Girl	Forest of Reading Red Maple Award for Fiction	Winner	
1999	Janey's Girl	National Chapter of Canada IODE Violet Downey Book Award	Winner	
2001	Janey's Girl	Manitoba Young Readers Choice Award	Nominee	
2001	Janey's Girl	Red Cedar Book Award	Winner	
2001	Men of Stone	Forest of Reading Red Maple Award for Fiction	Finalist	
2001	Men of Stone	Sheila A. Egoff Children's Literature Prize	Finalist	
2002	Men of Stone	Manitoba Young Readers Choice Award	Nominee	
2003	Losing Forever	Forest of Reading Red Maple Award for Fiction	Winner	
2003	Losing Forever	Sheila A. Egoff Children's Literature Prize	Finalist	
2004	Losing Forever	Manitoba Young Readers Choice Award	Nominee	
2007	The Isabel Factor	Forest of Reading Red Maple Award for Fiction	Finalist	
2008	For Now	Sheila A. Egoff Children's Literature Prize	Finalist	

== Publications ==
- Janey's Girl (1998)
- Men of Stone (2000)
- Losing Forever (2002)
- The Isabel Factor (2005)
- For Now (2007)
- The Valley (2008)
