= The Boy in the Burning House =

Book by Tim Wynne-Jones

- First edition
- Author: Tim Wynne-Jones
- Language: English
- Genre: young adult fiction, mystery fiction
- Published: 2000 (Groundwood Books)
- Publication place: Canada
- Media type: Print (Hardcover)
- Pages: 240
- ISBN: 9780888994103

The Boy in the Burning House is a young adult mystery novel by English-Canadian author Tim Wynne-Jones. It was first published in Canada in 2000 by Groundwood Books; the first American edition was published in 2001 by Farrar, Straus and Giroux.

== Awards and honors ==
- Winner of the 2001 Arthur Ellis Award for Best Juvenile or Young Adult Crime Book
- Nominated for the 2001 Ontario Library Association Red Maple Award
- Short-listed for the 2001 Ruth Schwartz Children's Book Award for Young Adult/Middle Reader Books
- Winner of the 2002 Edgar Award for Best Young Adult Mystery
- Named to the American Library Association's 2004 list of Popular Paperbacks for Young Readers
- Short-listed for The Guardian's 2005 Children's Fiction Prize
