= The Blackthorn Key =

Historical fiction/mystery book series by Kevin Sands

- Cover image of The Blackthorn Key
- The Blackthorn Key (2015); Mark of the Plague (2016); The Assassin's Curse (2017); Call of the Wraith (2019); The Traitor's Blade (2022); The Raven's Revenge (2024)
- Author: Kevin Sands
- Cover artist: Mike Miller
- Language: English
- Publisher: Simon & Schuster
- No. of books: 6
- Website: kevinsandsbooks.com/the-blackthorn-key

The Blackthorn Key is a historical fiction book series written by Kevin Sands. The series consists of six novels: The Blackthorn Key (2015), Mark of the Plague (2016), The Assassin's Curse (2017), Call of the Wraith (2019), The Traitor's Blade (2022), and The Raven's Revenge (2024).

This book series takes place in 17th-century England/Europe. The main character is Christopher Rowe, and his friends are Tom Bailey and Sally Deschamps. Together, they solve mysteries and stop malicious plots against their king, King Charles II.

== Plot ==
=== The Blackthorn Key ===
The book series starts on Ascension Day, May 28th, 1665. Christopher and his friend Tom are building a cannon while master Benedict Blackthorn comes and tells them not to. Benedict Blackthorn is Christopher's master, and he is an apothecary and codebreaker. Christopher learns all sorts of skills such as remedy-making, codebreaking, and even speaking Latin.

However, one day, Christopher was ordered by his master to run an errand. When he came back, he found his master murdered, along with one message. In the rest of The Blackthorn Key, Christopher and his best friend Tom decode master's message to find the most powerful incendiary ever - The Archangel's Fire.

=== Mark of the Plague ===
Mark of the Plague begins in late August of 1665. People are starting to catch the Black Death (plague) and are dying. Everybody starts becoming violent and starts stealing food due to a shortage. Sally gets beat up, and Christopher and Tom save her and take her to Blackthorn. She heals, and eventually they help track down the plague, except, they figure out Melchior (the "prophet") starts poisoning people with fake plague. Later, they find other people involved in the plot, and eventually the antagonists flee.

=== The Assassin's Curse ===
The Assassin's Curse begins in November 1665, when they receive a letter from Lord Richard Ashcombe. They find out that the king is in danger because assassins are attacking him and the French family. Christopher, Tom, and Sally are ordered to go to Paris by Lord Ashcombe and the King, and Christopher has to pretend like a fake baron. He and his friends find Molay's Curse stating that an ancient treasure is promised to anyone who kills the French royal line. To stop the assassins, Christopher and his friends find the treasure first before the assassins can, and save the French royal family. At the end, Marin Chastellain dies, and the mysterious character named the Raven sends Christopher a letter.

=== Call of the Wraith ===
Call of the Wraith begins when Christopher wakes up in a mysterious room and remembers nothing, including who he his himself. He is confused, and a farmer's family saved him from the shore on Devonshire. He later finds out stories about the White Lady taking children, and after solving each clue, he earns a piece of his memory back, until he finally has all of his memory back. He eventually finds out that the Darcys are selling the children to pirates, and Christopher, Tom, and Sally stop them. At the end, Lord Ashcombe comes and saves the three.

=== The Traitor's Blade ===
The book starts as Christopher, Tom, and Sally come back to London. They find their friend, Simon Chastellain, as he enters the house injured. Christopher brings a doctor to treat him, while he starts hunting down mysterious letters. He determines that they are from traitors who are trying to get rid of England's King. So, Christopher follows the messages and barely stopped the king from getting poisoned on time. At the end, he receives a letter from the Raven.

=== The Raven's Revenge ===
Christopher is in his shop, when he suddenly gets arrested. He is brought to Newgate prison for being accused of murder. Lord Ashcombe comes and saves him from prison. With Lord Walsingham, Christopher's spymaster, they help find who the Raven is. As the story progresses more and more, they narrow down possible candidates for the Raven.

The Raven gets Christopher and his friends into a game. Eventually, the friends find Issac, the bookseller, and they determine that the Raven is Peter Hyde, Benedict Blackthorn's apprentice before Christopher.

When the first meet the Raven, the see Simon. Soon, the realize the actual Simon was taken over by the Raven, who has plotted this out. In the end, Tom appears to be dead from Arsenic poisoning, but he later gets up and kills the Raven.

== Publication details ==
- The Blackthorn Key. New York: Aladdin. 2015. ISBN 978-1-4814-4651-8.
- Mark of the Plague. New York: Aladdin. 2016. ISBN 978-1-4814-4674-7.
- The Assassin's Curse. New York: Aladdin. 2017. ISBN 978-1-5344-0523-3.
- Call of the Wraith. New York: Aladdin. 2018. ISBN 978-1-534-42848-5.
- The Traitor's Blade. New York: Aladdin. 2022. ISBN 978-1-534-48457-3.
- The Raven's Revenge. New York: Aladdin. 2024. ISBN 978-1-534-48460-3.

== Awards and honours ==
The Blackthorn Key (2015), Mark of the Plague (2016), The Assassin's Curse (2017), and Call of the Wraith (2018) are Junior Library Guild books. The Chicago Public Library, and Kirkus Reviews named The Blackthorn Key among the best middle grade books of 2015. The following year, Bank Street College of Education included it on their list of the best historical fiction for children ages 9 to 12, and the Association for Library Service to Children included on their list of Notable Children's Books for Middle Readers. Bank Street College of Education also included Mark of the Plague on their 2017 list of the best historical fiction for children ages 9 to 12.

Awards for The Blackthorn Key books
Year	Work	Award	Result	Ref.
2015	The Blackthorn Key	Cybils Award for Middle Grade Fiction	Winner	
2016	The Blackthorn Key	Crime Writers of Canada Awards of Excellence: Best Juvenile or Young Adult Crime Book	Finalist	
2016	The Blackthorn Key	E. B. White Read Aloud Award for Middle Readers	Honor	
2016	The Blackthorn Key	Edgar Allan Poe Award for Best Juvenile	Finalist	
2016	The Blackthorn Key	John Spray Mystery Award	Winner	
2017	The Blackthorn Key	Silver Birch Award	Finalist	
2017	Mark of the Plague	Geoffrey Bilson Award	Winner	
2018	The Assassin’s Curse	Edgar Allan Poe Award for Best Juvenile	Finalist	
2018	The Assassin’s Curse	Geoffrey Bilson Award	Winner	
2018	The Assassin’s Curse	John Spray Mystery Award	Finalist	
2019	Call of the Wraith	Crime Writers of Canada Awards of Excellence: Best Juvenile or Young Adult Crime Book	Finalist	
2019	Call of the Wraith	John Spray Mystery Award	Finalist	
2020	Call of the Wraith	Forest of Reading Red Maple Award	Finalist	
2022	The Traitor's Blade	Crime Writers of Canada Awards of Excellence: Best Juvenile or Young Adult Crime Book	Winner	
2024	The Raven's Revenge	Ruth & Sylvia Schwartz Children's Book Award for Young Adult/Middle Readers	Winner	
