= Brian Slattery =

Canadian legal scholar

Brian Slattery, B.A., BCL, D.Phil., F.R.S.C., is a Professor Emeritus of Law at Osgoode Hall Law School, York University, in Toronto, Ontario, Canada. He is a prominent academic in Canadian Constitutional Law and Aboriginal rights discourse. He practices Aboriginal law at Slattery & Slattery.

== Education ==
Slattery holds a Doctorate of Law from Oxford University, a Bachelor of Civil Law (1968) from McGill University, and a Bachelor of Arts (Honours English) from Loyola College of Montreal.

== Academic career ==
Slattery joined Osgoode Hall Law School in 1981. He has previously held academic positions at McGill University, the University of Dar es Salaam (Tanzania) and the University of Saskatchewan, where he was Research Director of the Native Law Centre. Professor Slattery has been Senior Advisor to the Royal Commission on Aboriginal Peoples and was elected to the Royal Society of Canada in 1995 for his work on advancing aboriginal rights. Slattery was inducted as distinguished research professor at York University in 2009.

Professor Slattery has been cited by the Supreme Court of Canada in more than a dozen decisions, including most of the important cases dealing with aboriginal rights. His central thesis is that native Canadians (unlike those in many other countries) were never conquered and have inherent sovereignty from being the first occupiers of the land. The Government of Canada has never acquired a legal or moral right to impose its sovereignty over them. The honourable approach requires the government to recognize the inherent rights of the natives, and to negotiate, consult, and establish treaties where they do not yet exist, rather than force aboriginals to go to court to assert their rights.

== Publications ==
=== Books and monographs ===
- Ancestral Lands, Alien Laws: Judicial Perspectives on Aboriginal Title (Saskatoon: University of Saskatchewan Native Law Centre, 1983), 45 pages. Monograph analysing judicial theories of aboriginal title as developed by Canadian, American, and Commonwealth courts.
- The Land Rights of Indigenous Canadian Peoples (Saskatoon: University of Saskatchewan Native Law Centre, 1979), 478 pages. Work dealing with the historical and legal foundations of aboriginal land rights in Canada from the earliest days of contact to the close of the 17th century, and focussing in particular on the Royal Proclamation of 1763 (reprint of Oxford University Doctoral Thesis).
- Handbook on Sentencing (Nairobi: East African Literature Bureau, 1972), 194 pages. Book dealing with the legal principles of sentencing as expounded by East African and British courts.
- "Escape to Ponti" (Novel) Slattery's first novel for children.

=== Edited books ===
- Canadian Native Law Cases (University of Saskatchewan Native Law Centre, 1980–91), nine volumes, co-edited with L. Charlton and S. Stelck. Series collecting all reported Canadian legal decisions on native rights from 1763 to 1978, with topical indexes.

=== Chapters in books ===
- "The Pluralism of the Charter: Revisiting the Oakes Test" in Luc B. Tremblay & Gregoire C.N. Webber, eds., The Limitation of Charter Rights: Critical Essays on R. v. Oakes (Montreal: Editions Themis, 2009) 13-35 (23 pages).
- "Why the Governor General Matters" in Peter H. Russell & Lorne Sossin, eds., Parliamentary Democracy in Crisis (Toronto: University of Toronto Press, 2009), 79-90 (12 pages).
- "The Metamorphosis of Aboriginal Title" in Maria Morellato, ed. Aboriginal Law Since Delgamuukw (Aurora, Ont.: Canada Law Book, 2009) 145-73 (29 pages). This paper is a reprint of an article that first appeared in the Canadian Bar Review.
- "The Generative Structure of Aboriginal Rights" in John D. Whyte, ed., Moving Toward Justice: Legal Traditions and Aboriginal Justice (Saskatoon, Sask: Purich Publishing, 2008) 20-48 (29 pages). This paper is a reprint of an article first published in the Supreme Court Law Review.
- "A Taxonomy of Aboriginal Rights" in Hamar Foster, Heather Raven & Jeremy Webber, eds., Let Right Be Done: Aboriginal Title, the Calder Case, and the Future of Indigenous Rights (Vancouver: University of British Columbia Press, 2007) 111-28 (28 pages). This paper proposes a new conceptual scheme for aboriginal rights based on recent trends in Supreme Court decisions.
- "The Organic Constitution: Aboriginal Peoples and the Evolution of Canada" in Wesley Cragg and Christine Koggel, eds., Contemporary Moral Issues, 5th ed. (McGraw-Hill Ryerson Press, 2005) 317-23 (8 pages). This is a revised and updated version of a paper that was originally published in the Osgoode Hall Law Journal.
- "Paper Empires: The Legal Dimensions of French and English Ventures in North America", in John McLaren, A.R. Buck and Nancy E. Wright, eds. Despotic Dominion: Property Rights in British Settler Societies (Vancouver: University of British Columbia Press, 2005), 50-78 (29 pages). Paper discussing French and English state practice with respect to indigenous peoples and territories in North America in the 16th-17th centuries.
- "Our Mongrel Selves: Pluralism, Identity and the Nation", in Ysolde Gendreau, ed. Community of Right/Rights of the Community (Montreal: Editions Themis, 2003) 3-41 (39 pages). Paper criticizing the view that nations@are natural entities, composed of homogeneous linguistic and cultural groups, and argues for a view that takes account of multiple and overlapping identities.
- "Making Sense of Aboriginal and Treaty Rights", in Joseph Magnet, ed. Constitutional Law of Canada: Cases, Notes and Materials (Edmonton: Juriliber, 2001), I, 809-22 (14 pages). Revised version of "Making Sense of Aboriginal and Treaty Rights" (2000) 79 Canadian Bar Review 196-224 (29 pages), listed below.
- "The Nature of Aboriginal Title", in Owen Lippert ed., Beyond the Nass Valley: National Implications of the Supreme Court's Delgamuukw Decision (Vancouver: Fraser Institute, 2000), pp. 11–33 (23 pages). Paper discussing the nature and scope of aboriginal title in the light of the Supreme Court's decision in the Delgamuukw case.
- "The Recollection of Historical Practice", in Andrea P. Morrison, ed., Justice for Natives: Searching for Common Ground (Montreal: McGill-Queen's University Press, 1997), pp. 76–82 (7 pages). Paper surveying alternative approaches to the question of aboriginal rights.
- "Bringing the Constitution Home", in Andrea P. Morrison, ed., Justice for Natives: Searching for Common Ground (Montreal: McGill-Queen's University Press, 1997), pp. 128–134 (7 pages). Paper arguing for a new model of the Constitution of Canada, one that is grounded in Canadian history and experience and in particular the history of relations between Aboriginal peoples and the Crown.
- "Transcending Community: Some Thoughts on Havel and Bergson", in M.M. Karlsson, O.P. Jonsson. and E.M. Brynjarsdottir, eds., Law, Justice and the State (Berlin: Duncker & Humblot, 1993), pp. 265–76 (12 pages). Paper discussing the tension between human rights and communal ties, as seen in the writings of Václav Havel and Henri Bergson.
- "First Nations and the Constitution: A Question of Trust", in R.S. Blair and J.T. McLeod, eds., The Canadian Political Tradition, 2nd ed. (Toronto: Nelson Canada, 1993), pp. 112–36 (25 pages). Edited version of "First Nations and the Constitution: A Question of Trust" (1992), 71 Canadian Bar Review 261-93, listed below.
- "Aboriginal Sovereignty and Imperial Claims", in B.W. Hodgins, S. Heard, and J.S. Milloy, eds., Co-Existence?: Studies in Ontario-First Nations Relations (Peterborough, Ont.: Frost Centre of Trent University, 1992), pp. 151–70 (20 pages). Reprint of "Aboriginal Sovereignty and Imperial Claims" (1991) 29 Osgoode Hall Law Journal 681-703, listed below.
- "The Legal Basis of Aboriginal Title", in F. Cassidy, ed., Aboriginal Title in British Columbia: Delgamuukw v. The Queen (Montreal: Institute for Research on Public Policy, 1992), pp. 113–32 (20 pages). Paper considering various approaches to the question of aboriginal land rights in the light of the judgement of the B.C. Supreme Court in the Delgamuukw case.
- "The Myth of Retributive Justice", in W. Cragg ed., Retributivism and Its Critics (Stuttgart: Franz Steiner Verlag, 1992), pp. 27–34 (8 pages). Paper suggesting that the notion of retribution is intimately connected with our sense of time and narrative, and as such resists conventional philosophical analysis.
- "Aboriginal Sovereignty and Imperial Claims", in Frank Cassidy, ed., Aboriginal Self-Determination (Halifax, N.S.: Institute for Research on Public Policy, 1991), pp. 197–217 (21 pages). Reprint of "Aboriginal Sovereignty and Imperial (1991) 29 Osgoode Hall Law Journal 681-703, listed below.
- "Does the Charter Apply to Private Persons?", in Saywell and Vegh, eds., Making the Law: The Courts and the Constitution (Toronto: Copp Clark Pitman Ltd., 1991), pp. 390–401 (12 pages). Reprint of "Does the Charter Apply to Private Persons?" (1985) 63 Canadian Bar Review 148-61, listed below.
- "Are Constitutional Cases Political?", in Barker, ed., Contending Perspectives (Toronto: Nelson Canada, 1991). Reprint of "Are Constitutional Cases Political?" (1988) 11 Supreme Court Law Review 507-27, listed below.
- "Aboriginal Language Rights", in Schneiderman, ed., Language and the State, (Cowansville, Que.: Editions Yvon Blais, 1991), pp. 369–74 (6 pages). Paper outlining a general theory of aboriginal language rights under the Canadian Constitution.
- "Two Models of the Charter", in G. Lafrance, ed., Ethics and Basic Rights (Ottawa: University of Ottawa Press, 1989), pp. 300–05 (6 pages). Adapted excerpt from "A Theory of the Charter", (1988) 25 Osgoode Hall Law Journal 701-47, listed below.
- "The Constitutional Priority of the Charter", in K. Swinton and S. Rogerson, eds., Competing Constitutional Visions: The Meech Lake Accord (1988), pp. 81–93 (13 pages). Paper arguing that the Charter presumptively takes priority over subsequent constitutional amendments.
- "Did France Claim Canada Upon 'Discovery'?", in Bumsted, ed., Interpreting Canada's Past (Toronto: Oxford University Press, 1986), Vol. I, pp. 2–26 (25 pages). Revised version of "French Claims in North America, 1500-59", (1978) 59 Canadian Historical Review 139-69, listed below.
- "The Hidden Constitution: Aboriginal Rights in Canada", in Boldt, Long, and Little Bear, eds., The Quest for Justice: Aboriginal People and Aboriginal Rights (Toronto: University of Toronto Press, 1985), pp. 114–38 (25 pages). Adapted version of "The Hidden Constitution: Aboriginal Rights in Canada" (1984) 32 American Journal of Comparative Law 361-91, listed below.

=== Journal articles ===
- "The Generative Structure of Aboriginal Rights" (2007) 38 Supreme Court Law Review (2d) 595-628 (34 pages)
- "The Metamorphosis of Aboriginal Title" (2006) 85 Canadian Bar Review 255-86 (31 pages). Paper arguing that we need to distinguish between principles of recognition and principles of reconciliation in applying the constitutional guarantee of aboriginal rights.
- "Aboriginal Rights and the Honour of the Crown" (2005) 29 Supreme Court Law Review 433-45. Paper arguing that the guarantee of aboriginal rights in section 35(1) of the Constitution Act should be viewed as embodying a generative constitutional order directed at the Crown and Aboriginal peoples, and not simply as a static order directed at the courts.
- "Making Sense of Aboriginal and Treaty Rights" (2000) 79 Canadian Bar Review 196-224 (29 pages). Paper proposing a general framework for understanding aboriginal and treaty rights, in light of the jurisprudence of the Supreme Court over the past thirty years.
- "Some Thoughts on Aboriginal Title" (1999) 48 University of New Brunswick Law Journal 19-40 (22 pages). Paper reviewing the status of aboriginal land rights, with particular reference to the Maritime Provinces; Rand Memorial Lecture, Faculty of Law, University of New Brunswick.
- "Varieties of Aboriginal Rights", (1998) 6 Canada Watch 71-73 (3 pages). Essay arguing that aboriginal rights fall into two basic categories B generic rights and specific rights B and that the right of self-government is a generic right rather than a specific right.
- "Three Concepts of Law: The Ambiguous Legacy of H.L.A. Hart", (1998) 61 Saskatchewan Law Review 323-39 (17 pages). Paper arguing that three distinct theories of law may be detected in Hart's work and that, of these, the participatory theory is the most satisfactory.
- "Law's Meaning", (1996) 34 Osgoode Hall Law Journal 553-81 (29 pages). Paper defending the view that law has an autonomous meaning, one that is in principle independent of both author and interpreter.
- "The Organic Constitution: Aboriginal Peoples and the Evolution of Canada", (1996) 34 Osgoode Hall Law Journal 101-12 (12 pages). Paper arguing for a new way of understanding the genesis and sources of the Canadian Constitution, so as to take account of the contributions of Aboriginal peoples.
- "The Paradoxes of National Self-Determination", (1994) 32 Osgoode Hall Law Journal 703-33 (31 pages). Paper criticizing the theory that the right of self-determination gives national groups an unqualified power to secede at their own option from existing states.
- "First Nations and the Constitution: A Question of Trust", (1992) 71 Canadian Bar Review 261-93 (33 pages). Paper presenting a comprehensive view of the governmental powers of aboriginal peoples, as a third order of government in Canada, and arguing that the fiduciary relationship between aboriginal peoples and the Crown is a special instance of a doctrine of collective trust that animates the Constitution as a whole.
- "Aboriginal Sovereignty and Imperial Claims", (1991) 29 Osgoode Hall Law Journal 681-703 (23 pages). Paper discussing the basis of European claims to territory in the North America and arguing that a new theoretical framework is needed to understand the evolution of the international law governing sovereignty and territorial rights, one that takes account of the historical sovereign status and contributions of indigenous American peoples.
- "Rights, Communities, and Tradition", (1991) 41 University of Toronto Law Journal 447-67 (21 pages). Paper arguing that there is a close connection between basic human rights and communal bonds and criticizing the philosophical views of Gewirth and MacIntyre, which in differing ways deny this connection.
- "Federal Jurisdiction", (co-authored with John M. Evans), (1989) 68 Canadian Bar Review 817-42 (26 pages). Paper reviewing recent developments in the law governing the jurisdiction of the Federal Court, with particular reference to aboriginal matters.
- "Are Constitutional Cases Political?", (1988) 11 Supreme Court Law Review 507-27 (21 pages). Review essay examining critically the claim that constitutional decisions are necessarily "political" and "subjective" in nature.
- "A Theory of the Charter", (1988) 25 Osgoode Hall Law Journal 701-47 (47 pages). Paper criticizing the standard judicially oriented conception of the Charter and developing a new "coordinate" model, which assigns greater significance to the decisions of the legislative and executive branches.
- "Understanding Aboriginal Rights", (1987) 66 Canadian Bar Review 727-83 (56 pages). Paper developing a new theory of aboriginal rights in Canada, grounded in a body of Canadian common law that emerged from the historical relations between the Crown and indigenous Canadian peoples.
- "The Charter's Relevance to Private Litigation: Does Dolphin Deliver?", (1987) 32 McGill Law Journal 905-23 (19 pages). Paper criticizing of the Supreme Court's interpretation of the Charter's range of application.
- "Charter of Rights and Freedoms - Does It Bind Private Persons?", (1985) 63 Canadian Bar Review 148-61 (14 pages). Note outlining a general theoretical framework for determining the Charter's application to relations between private individuals.
- "The Hidden Constitution: Aboriginal Rights in Canada", (1984), 32 American Journal of Comparative Law 361-91 (31 pages). Article reviewing the constitutional and historical grounds for aboriginal and treaty rights in Canada, and discussing the effects of the entrenchment of these rights in the Constitution of Canada.
- "Canadian Charter of Rights and Freedoms - Override Clauses under Section 33 - Whether Subject to Judicial Review under Section 1", (1983) 61 Canadian Bar Review 391-97 (7 pages). Note arguing that override clauses enacted under section 33 of the Constitution Act, 1982, may be subject to judicial review in certain instances.
- "The Independence of Canada", (1983) 5 Supreme Court Law Review 369-404 (36 pages). Article tracing the legal genesis of Canadian independence and arguing that the Constitution of Canada rests ultimately upon basic common law principles rather than statute law.
- "The Constitutional Guarantee of Aboriginal and Treaty Rights", (1982–83) 8 Queen's Law Journal 232-73 (42 pages). Article discussing the scope and effects of sections 25 and 35 of the Constitution Act, 1982.
- "French Claims in North America, 1500-59", (1978) 59 Canadian Historical Review 139-69 (31 pages). Article arguing that, contrary to the received view, France did not advance official territorial claims to America during the early French voyages (31 pages).
- "Drafting Criminal Charges", (1974) 7 Eastern Africa Law Review 275-91 (17 pages). Article discussing the principles and policies underlying criminal charges.
