= Double Dribble (video game) =

1986 video game

- North American arcade flyer
- Developer: Konami
- Publisher: Konami
- Platforms: Arcade, Famicom Disk System, NES, Commodore 64, Amiga, Game Boy
- Release: November 4, 1986: Arcade; JP: November 4, 1986; NA: February 1987 Famicom Disk System; JP: July 24, 1987 NES; NA: September 1987; PAL: 1988 Game Boy; NA: December 1991; JP: September 25, 1992; EU: 1994
- Genres: Sports (basketball)
- Modes: Single-player, multiplayer

Double Dribble (Note: Japanese: ダブルドリブル, Hepburn: Daburu Doriburu) is a 1986 basketball video game developed and published by Konami for arcades. It was the second basketball game by Konami, following Super Basketball. It was considered the most realistic basketball sports game upon release, with fast-paced action, detailed players, a large side-scrolling court, innovative cinematic slam dunks, and detailed sound effects, beginning a trend where presentation would play an increasingly important role in sports games.

Much of the game's popularity came from its animation sequences showing basketball players performing slam dunks, as well as "The Star-Spangled Banner" theme during the attract mode. These were uncommon in video games at the time of Double Dribble's release. It was successful in the arcades, while the 1987 Nintendo Entertainment System port sold 2 million units.

Double Dribble was followed by Double Dribble: The Playoff Edition, which was released in 1994 for the Genesis/Mega Drive. A remake, Double Dribble Fastbreak, was released for iOS in 2010, being based mostly on the NES version, but the animation sequences were ripped from the arcade version.

== Gameplay ==
Arcade screenshot

=== Arcade version ===
Like its predecessor, Super Basketball, the player controls a five-man basketball team playing against the computer-controlled team, or controlled by a second player. When a coin is inserted, a credit is displayed on the bottom of the screen, along with a timer indicating one minute. The player is then prompted to enter their initials before starting the game.

The gameplay is a marked difference and improvement from its predecessor, as the characters look and move better around the court. Like a traditional basketball game, the centers come out to the middle of the court, and the referee institutes a jump ball to begin the game.

The goal for Double Dribble is for the player to have scored more points than the computer team before the time runs out. Doing so awarded the player with another minute of time, and the game continues. The longer the game is played, the more difficult it becomes. If the computer team has as many points or more as the player's team when time runs out, the game ends.

The controls are an 8-way joystick and three buttons: one to dribble the ball on offense, one to pass the ball on offense, and one to shoot the ball on offense. On defense, the dribble button becomes the steal button, the pass button becomes the switch button to switch players, and the shoot button becomes the jump button.

If the player is on offense, they must repeatedly hit the dribble button while moving the joystick in a certain direction in order to move the character with the ball. To pass the ball, the player moves the joystick in the direction of the character's teammate (indicated by an aura in the player's team's color) and press the pass button. To shoot the ball, the player must press and hold the shoot button until the character reaches the top of their jump, at which point the button must be released.

If the player controls a character in the lane and moving toward the basket and they hit the shot button, the screen changes to focus on the character attempting a dunk. The player must hold the button down until the character reaches the top of the jump and then release it. If the timing of the button's release is incorrect, the ball bounces high and far off the rim, and the player must rebound the ball.

Each character moves at slightly different speeds, and is capable of jumping to different heights, and at different speeds. Learning the differences between each character's movement is important to performing jump shots, dunks, and also get good at rebounds, which is important at later stages of the game.

If the player is on defense, the player can try to steal the ball from the computer by moving towards the ball and hitting the steal button. If done correctly, the player controlled character will steal the ball. The game then displays the message 'Nice steal!', and the player takes the offense role. There is a chance that while doing this that the player controlled character will foul the computer, who will then be sent to the free-throw line.

If the player needs to switch control to a different player on their team, they move the joystick towards the preferred character and press the pass button. Control is instantly switched to that character.

When a character on the opposing team takes a shot, and the player controlled character is near to them, pressing the shot button will cause the player character to jump and possibly block the shot. If a shot is missed, moving the player character beneath the shadow of the ball and pressing the shot button executes an attempt to rebound the basketball.

If the player character is fouled, he is sent to the free-throw line. Five characters will take their places on opposing sides of the lane, with the player character at the free-throw line. The player then has five seconds for each free throw attempt. A ring starts above the basket, and when the player presses and hold the shoot button, the ring descends towards the basket. The player must get the ring as close to the basket as possible in order to make the free throw. As with their jumps, each character's ring descends at different speeds.

Like a real NBA game, the game is divided into four quarters at 12 minutes per quarter. After the end of each quarter there is a challenge stage, which is a three-point shootout. In these stages, the player controls a character from their team attempting five three-point shots at each corner, each wing, and from the top of the key for a total of 25 shots. The player presses and holds the shoot button until the character reaches the top of his jump, and then releases it. Each successful shot adds 1 second to the player's time remaining for a total of 25 seconds, with an additional bonus of 1 minute if all shots succeed. Play then continues until the player runs out of time while having fewer points than the opposing team, or the score is tied.

The game's high-score table is unique, in that a player can get on the table by scoring a lot of points, shooting a high percentage either in-game or from the free-throw line, grabbing a lot of rebounds, dishing out assists, or by committing the fewest fouls. Players still have to score more points than the lowest score on the high score table to qualify, however.

=== NES version ===
Several positions on the court were 'hot spots', high-percentage areas where shots were taken were likely to score points (e.g., "a fade-away, banked 3-pointer"). For example: it is easier to hit a 3-pointer on the bottom right-hand side of the screen. A player could start a 3-point jump shot from the top right or left corner of the court inbounds, and continue the jump out of bounds and even slightly behind the hoop and it would go in nearly every time. Another nearly guaranteed shot is taken with the player standing 3-quarters length of the court away from their goal could go for a running 3-point shot, provided that the shot button was pressed within the other team's free-throw shooting circle. In certain circumstances, the display would break away from the full court action and show a close-up of the players either dunking the ball or making a shot. Frequently a player would miss a slam dunk, which is a very high percentage shot.

While the Arcade Version has time based play, the NES version allows you to play the full game regardless of score. Quarters can be played with 5, 10, 20, or 30 minute lengths. Single Player games can be played against three CPU skill levels, and a Versus Mode is also available for two players to play against each other. Players can choose from one of four teams: Boston, Chicago, Los Angeles and New York. There is no difference in skill level or abilities between the teams. In 1P Mode, the CPU Team will always be Boston, but in versus mode, the only rule is that both players can't be the same team. Since there is no NBA license, no team names or player names are used, but the teams wear the same color of their NBA counterparts, and the teams had similar names: L.A. Breakers, Boston Frogs, Chicago Ox, and New York Eagles.

Winning a game would show a basketball player in the team colors triumphantly holding up a trophy. The trophy's color was dependent on number of opponents defeated, one bronze, two silver, and all three gold.

== Ports ==
FDS Exciting Basket cover

Konami released ports for the Famicom Disk System and Nintendo Entertainment System in 1987; the FDS version was titled Exciting Basket (エキサイティング バスケット, Ekisaitingu Basuketto). The NES version features 5-on-5 action on a horizontally scrolling court, four teams (Boston Frogs, New York Eagles, Chicago Ox, Los Angeles Breakers), three levels of single-play difficulty, and four choices of quarter lengths. Double Dribble was among the first games to feature cut scenes, which depicted a mid-air player completing a slam dunk, and one of the first to use speech, though in a limited quantity (such as announcing the game title, the game's beginning jump ball, and some foul calls). "The Star-Spangled Banner" in this version was slightly altered, while it was being played in a cut scene depicting the crowd entering the stadium before the menu pops up. In 1990, ports were published for the Commodore 64, Amiga, and MS-DOS. In 1991, a Game Boy version was released titled Double Dribble 5-on-5. The NES version was ported to the Wii's Virtual Console in Europe on November 16, 2007, and in North America on November 26, 2007.

== Reception ==
Retrospective reviews (NES version)

Review scores
Publication	Score
AllGame	5/5 (NES)
GameSpot	5/10 (Virtual Console)

In Japan, Game Machine listed the arcade version of Double Dribble as the 20th most successful table arcade unit of March 1987. The NES port sold 2 million units.

The NES version has received a mostly positive reception from retrospective reviews. Allgame awarded the game 5 out of 5 stars. The review referred to the game as the most realistic rendition of basketball on its release, and that it "was the beginning of a new era" for sports games in which presentation played an increasingly important role. GameSpot editor Frank Provo displayed mixed feelings towards the Virtual Console release, emphasizing that after a few minutes of play time, players start noticing design quirks that force the player to play the game a certain way. Provo also criticized the computer player's unfair ability to catch up with the player.

== Legacy ==
A Sega Genesis sequel was released in 1994 as Double Dribble: The Playoff Edition in North America and as Hyperdunk in Japan and Europe.

A remake for iOS titled Double Dribble Fast Break was released in 2010.

Gameplay of the NES version of Double Dribble from a YouTube video was shown in the Family Guy episode "Run, Chris, Run". 20th Century Fox accidentally took down the original video, believing it to be a clip from the episode before reversing the decision.

== See also ==
- Arch Rivals (1989)
- NBA Jam (1993 video game)
