= Double Dribble: The Playoff Edition =

1994 video game

- Developer: Konami
- Publisher: Konami
- Composer: Miki Higashino
- Platform: Sega Genesis
- Release: JP: March 4, 1994; EU: April 15, 1994; NA: April 27, 1994
- Modes: Single-player, multiplayer

Double Dribble: The Playoff Edition, originally released in Japan as Hyper Dunk: The Playoff Edition (ハイパー ダンク ザ プレイオフ エディション, Haipā Danku Za Pureiofu Edishon), and later released in Europe as HyperDunk, is a basketball video game developed and published by Konami for the Sega Genesis. It is the follow-up to the Double Dribble, originally released for the arcade in 1986 and various home computer systems and consoles.

== Gameplay ==
With the help of Sega's Team Player Adaptor peripheral, up to eight different players can play the game. The three modes of play are Exhibition, Multi-Play, and Playoff. In Playoff Mode, one team is selected and placed in a tournament bracket. The first round is a best-of-5 series while the remaining rounds are best-of-seven. Passwords are given during the semi-final round.

Each player has a separate gauge that determines their energy level in addition to how effective that they are with their shots. Unlike the NBA or NCAA college basketball, the shot clock is shown in milliseconds in addition to seconds. Each player is shown with an identical height and weight to all the other players in-game.

Instead of four teams like the original, players can choose to be one of the 16 teams which vaguely resemble teams from the National Basketball Association. The team name for each city corresponds to the culture of each venue.

== Reception ==
GamePro panned the game, commenting that the controls make it impossible to play good defense, it is too difficult to keep track of who's who in multiplayer, the animations are poor, and that the announcer was annoying in his review.

Reception

Review scores
Publication	Score
Electronic Gaming Monthly	5.2/10 stars
GamePro	2.5/5 stars
