= Men of Stone =

Book by Gayle Friesen

- Author: Gayle Friesen
- Language: English
- Genre: Children's literature
- Publisher: Kids Can Press Ltd.
- Publication date: 2008
- Media type: Print (Hardback & Paperback)
- Pages: 217 pp
- ISBN: 9781550747829

Men of Stone is a novel written by Gayle Friesen that was first published in 2000. It was the second book that was written by Friesen.

== Plot summary ==
The novel follows Ben Conrad, a fifteen-year-old boy struggling with family affairs, school, and bullying.

Ben is surrounded by females at home: three older sisters and his mother. His father died when he was only five years old. Now that he has grown older, he knows he has to step up and be the man of his family. When a distant relative, Aunt Frieda, comes to visit, he finds out how strong an old woman can truly be. As Ben learns about Aunt Frieda's past life in Russia and her love and determination for her family, the two rapidly develop an unexpected relationship that strengthens both, especially Ben who learns to stand up for himself and believe in what he does.

Ben initially strives to keep out of trouble - he is a good son at home and a good student at school, showing kindness to everyone, including Claude, who regularly bullies Ben and humiliates him at the school dance. Frieda reveals that she has experienced similar troubles to Ben in her life. Her husband Henry had been taken away to prison by corrupt officials, which she called "men of stone". When she went to visit Henry, her son went missing and never returned. While Frieda had thought of nothing but revenge, she learned that being controlled by hatred did nothing to solve the problems before her.

The pressure of keeping his anger and hatred inside himself gradually consumes Ben, along with the desire to exact revenge on everyone who has teased him about his dancing and hurt his friends, and for not understanding him. However, Ben recalls Aunt Frieda's stories during his fight with Claude and realizes that he is turning into a "man of stone" from being consumed by his desire for revenge. Ben learns to let go of his anger and move forward.
