= Arthur Slade =

Canadian novelist and children's author (born 1967)

- Born: Arthur Gregory Slade; July 9, 1967 (age 59); Moose Jaw, Saskatchewan, Canada
- Education: University of Saskatchewan (BA, 1989)
- Occupations: Novelist, children's author
- Writing career
- Genres: Children's literature, young adult fiction, fantasy, horror fiction, historical fiction
- Notable works: Dust (2001), The Hunchback Assignments (2009)
- Notable awards: Governor General's Literary Award (2001), TD Canadian Children's Literature Award (2010), Kloppenburg Award for Literary Excellence (2019)
- Website: arthurslade.com

Arthur Gregory Slade (born July 9, 1967) is a Canadian novelist and author of children's and young adult literature. His writing encompasses fantasy, horror, historical fiction, and science fiction. He is best known for his novel Dust (2001), which won the Governor General's Award for English-language children's literature, and The Hunchback Assignments (2009), which won the TD Canadian Children's Literature Award in 2010. He received the Cheryl and Henry Kloppenburg Award for Literary Excellence in 2019 in recognition of his body of work.

== Early life and education ==
Slade was born in Moose Jaw, Saskatchewan, on July 9, 1967. He grew up on a ranch in the Cypress Hills of southwestern Saskatchewan, where his parents, Robert and Anne Slade, raised their family. His mother was also a writer. Slade developed an interest in storytelling at an early age and began writing novels while attending high school.

He completed his secondary education in Gull Lake, Saskatchewan, before enrolling at the University of Saskatchewan in Saskatoon. He graduated with an honours degree in English in 1989. His first published short story appeared that year in the literary magazine Transition.

Following university, Slade worked in radio advertising in Saskatoon for approximately five years before becoming a full-time writer.

== Writing career ==
=== Early publications ===
Although Slade had written several novels before achieving publication, his first published novel was Draugr (1997), the opening volume of his Northern Frights series. Published by Orca Book Publishers, the series drew on Norse mythology and continued with The Haunting of Drang Island (1998) and The Loki Wolf (2000). Draugr received nominations for Saskatchewan and small-press literary awards.

In 2001, Slade published Dust, a supernatural novel set in a Saskatchewan prairie community during the Great Depression. The story concerns a young boy investigating his brother's disappearance and the influence of a mysterious stranger on his community. A review in Quill & Quire identified the novel as a combination of the traditional prairie coming-of-age narrative and small-town horror fiction.

Dust won the 2001 Governor General's Literary Award for Children's Literature, the 2001 Saskatchewan Book Award for Children's Literature, and a 2002 Mr. Christie's Book Award.

Slade subsequently published Tribes (2002) and the Canadian Chills series, beginning with Return of the Grudstone Ghosts (2002). The latter received the 2003 Diamond Willow Award in Saskatchewan's Young Readers' Choice Awards.

His 2006 historical novel Megiddo's Shadow, set during the First World War, was inspired by the wartime experiences of his grandfather, Percy Slade. The novel won the 2006 Saskatchewan Book Award for Children's Literature.

=== The Hunchback Assignments ===
In 2009, Slade published The Hunchback Assignments, the first novel in a four-book steampunk adventure series. Set in a fictionalized Victorian era, the series follows Modo, a physically disfigured young man with the ability to alter his appearance, who becomes a secret agent. Its sequels are The Dark Deeps (2010), Empire of Ruins (2011), and Island of Doom (2012).

The Hunchback Assignments won the 2010 TD Canadian Children's Literature Award, presented by the Canadian Children's Book Centre and TD Bank.

Slade later returned to Modo in the graphic novel Modo: Ember's End, illustrated by Christopher Steininger, which places the character in a fictionalized American West setting.

=== Later writing ===
Slade continued to publish fantasy and horror fiction during the 2010s. His novel Flickers (2016) combines historical fiction and supernatural horror in a story involving the early American film industry. Reviewing the novel in Quill & Quire, Dory Cerny discussed its treatment of early Hollywood, social inequality, and speculative themes.

His fantasy novel Crimson (2018) follows a young protagonist living under an authoritarian magical ruler. A review by Grace O'Connell in Quill & Quire noted the novel's use of language, cultural identity, and political control as central themes. The book received the G. Murray and Edna Forbes Young Adult Literature Award at the 2019 Saskatchewan Book Awards.

Slade's later works include the Amber Fang vampire adventure series and the Dragon Assassin fantasy series. Dragon Assassin, published by Scholastic Canada in 2020, was shortlisted for the Ontario Library Association's Red Maple Award in 2021.

=== Literary archives ===
Slade's manuscripts and related literary papers are preserved in the Toronto Public Library's special collections. The Arthur Slade fonds includes material dating from 1991 to 2010, comprising drafts, correspondence, research notes, proofs, and publication records. Slade donated collections of his literary papers in 2005 and 2010.

== Awards and recognition ==
Slade has received several Canadian literary awards for individual works and for his overall contribution to literature.

- 2001: Governor General's Literary Award for Children's Literature for Dust.
- 2001: Saskatchewan Book Award for Children's Literature for Dust.
- 2002: Mr. Christie's Book Award for Dust.
- 2003: Diamond Willow Award for Return of the Grudstone Ghosts.
- 2006: Saskatchewan Book Award for Children's Literature for Megiddo's Shadow.
- 2010: Diamond Willow Award for Jolted: Newton Starker's Rules for Survival.
- 2010: TD Canadian Children's Literature Award for The Hunchback Assignments.
- 2019: G. Murray and Edna Forbes Young Adult Literature Award for Crimson.
- 2019: Cheryl and Henry Kloppenburg Award for Literary Excellence, recognizing his overall literary achievements.

== Selected bibliography ==
=== Northern Frights series ===
- Draugr (1997)
- The Haunting of Drang Island (1998)
- The Loki Wolf (2000)

=== Canadian Chills series ===
- Return of the Grudstone Ghosts (2002)
- Ghost Hotel (2004)
- Invasion of the IQ Snatchers (2007)

=== The Hunchback Assignments series ===
- The Hunchback Assignments (2009)
- The Dark Deeps (2010)
- Empire of Ruins (2011)
- Island of Doom (2012)

=== Amber Fang series ===
- Amber Fang: The Hunted (2016)
- Amber Fang: Betrayal (2017)
- Amber Fang: Revenge (2018)

=== Dragon Assassin series ===
- Twin Fury (2019)
- Royal Blood (2020)
- Burning Empire (2020)
- Downfall (2020)
- Deathwings (2022)

=== Other fiction ===
- Dust (2001)
- Tribes (2002)
- Megiddo's Shadow (2006)
- Jolted: Newton Starker's Rules for Survival (2008)
- Flickers (2016)
- Crimson (2018)
- Death by Airship (2019)
- Mr. Universe (2021)
- I, Brax: A Battle Divine (2024)

=== Non-fiction and collections ===
- John Diefenbaker: An Appointment with Destiny (2001)
- Monsterology: The Fabulous Lives of the Creepy, the Revolting, and the Undead (2005)
- Villainology: Fabulous Lives of the Big, the Bad, and the Wicked (2007)
- Shades (2011)

=== Comics and graphic novels ===
- Hallowed Knight (1997), comic book series
- Modo: Ember's End (2018 edition), with Christopher Steininger
