= Richard Scrimger =

Canadian writer (born 1957)

- Born: 5 April 1957 (age 69) Montreal, Quebec, Canada
- Occupation: Children's author and novelist
- Education: University of Toronto (BA, 1979)
- Spouse: Bridget Campion (m. 1985)
- Children: 4

Website
- scrimger.ca

Richard Scrimger (born 1957) is a Canadian writer who has published fourteen books since 1996. He is best known for his children's literature, but has also written three books for adults: Crosstown (1996), Still Life With Children (1997) and Mystical Rose (2000). His books have been translated into several languages.

== Early life and education ==
Scrimger was born in Montreal on 5 April 1957, to Dan and Nicki Scrimger. He has at least one sibling. He moved with his family to Scarborough, Ontario when he was two years old, then moved into Downtown Toronto around age nine. He attended Edgewood Public School, Deer Park Public School and North Toronto Collegiate Institute. He received a Bachelor of Arts in English and history from the University of Toronto in 1979.

== Career ==
After graduating from the University of Toronto, Scrimger travelled in Europe for a year, during which time he waited tables and began writing. He completed his first full-length novel at that time, though it was never published. Scrimger continued working in restaurants while writing his first books and working as a stay-at-home dad.

Scrimger finished a draft of his first published novel, Crosstown (1996), in the early 1990s. The novel, published by Riverbank Press, features Dr. Mitchell, a "homeless alcoholic", who learns that the shelter he typically patronizes has been moved from one side of Toronto to the other. The novel was shortlisted for the 1997 Toronto Book Award.

After submitting Crosstown for publication, Scrimger attended an intensive program at Humber College School for Writers. During this program, he began drafting his second book, Still Life With Children (1997), which consists of fiction and nonfiction short stories about life with children. Stories from the novel were originally published in The Globe and Mail before being published as a collection by HarperCollins.

Scrimger's first work for children, a short story, was published in the anthology Laughs, edited by Claire Mackay, who happened to be a family friend. Mackay encouraged Scrimger to submit a piece for the anthology. He ultimately submitted "Introducing Norbert", a story about an alien who lives in a boy's nose. Scrimger later expanded on the short story to write The Nose From Jupiter (1998). In 1999, the book won the Mr. Christie's Book Award for Ages 8 to 11. The book was followed up by three more Norbert books: A Nose For Adventure (2001), Noses Are Red (2002), and The Boy From Earth (2004), all published by Tundra Books.

In 2000, Scrimger published his second novel for adults, Mystical Rose, which features Rose Rolyoke, who has Alzheimer's disease and is nearing the end of her life. Robert Wiersema, writing for Quill & Quire, stated that the novel's concepts could read as cliche, though Scrimger writes well on the subject, creating "a book of true beauty and grace, delicately balanced and nuanced".

Scrimger has since published many children's books, including picture books, middle grade novels, and young adult novels. With Gillian Johnson as illustrator, Scrimger published a series of three picture books about a child nicknamed Bun Bun: Bun Bun's Birthday (2001), Princess Bun Bun (2002), and Eugene's Story (2003). Scrimger also published Lucky Jonah (2016), which was shortlisted for the 2017 Ruth & Sylvia Schwartz Children's Book Awards for Young Adult/Middle Reader. That same year, Zomboy (2016) was longlisted for the Sunburst Award for Young Adult. In 2024, Scrimger published Your Story Matters, a writing guide for children illustrated by D. McFadzean. The book is a Junior Library Guild selection, and was a finalist for the 2025-2026 Hackmatack Children's Choice Book Award for English-language Non-Fiction. Also in 2024, Scrimger's novel At the Speed of Gus was a finalist for the Joan Betty Stuchner – Oy Vey! – Funniest Children's Book Award for Fiction.

Several of Scrimger's books include disability representation. Scrimger's adult novel Mystical Rose (2000) features an elderly woman with Alzheimer's. Looking at Scrimger's children's books, the protagonist of From Charlie's Point of View (2005) is 13-year-old Charlie Fairmile, who has been blind since birth and helps solve a local mystery. Name, writing for Quill & Quire, Robert J. Wiersema highlighted how the book's sections written from Charlie's perspective provide "a nuanced, detailed world free of visual cues," which they found "unsettling and effective." Downside Up (2016), which primarily centres overcoming grief regarding the death of loved ones, also features a character with depression. At the Speed of Gus (2024) centres Gus, who is ADHD and learning how to manage his medication.

Other books discuss racism. Zomboy (2017) features Imre Lazar, who has become a zombie following a radiation leak. As others in the story support or antagonize Imre for his condition, Imre also experiences racist bullying. In Autumn Bird and the Runaway (2022), published as The Other Side of Perfect (2024) in the United States and co-authored by Melanie Florence, one of the main characters, Autumn, is Cree. Autumn is friends with the popular crowd at school and helps Cody, who has run away from his abusive father. However, tensions rise when Cody repeats his father's racist ideas.

== Personal life ==
Scrimger married Bridget Campion, a moral theologian, in 1985. The couple have four children. While writing, Scrimger also worked as a stay-at-home dad.

Scrimger has lived in Toronto most of his life, but moved to Cobourg when his children were younger.

== Publications ==
=== Children's and young adult books ===
- Scrimger, Richard (1999). The Way to Schenectady. Tundra. ISBN 0887764274.
- Scrimger, Richard (2001). Of Mice & Nutcrackers. Illustrated by Linda Hendry. Tundra. ISBN 9780887764981.
- Scrimger, Richard (2005). From Charlie's Point of View. Tundra. ISBN 0525473742.
- Scrimger, Richard (2007). Into the Ravine. Tundra. ISBN 0887768229.
- Scrimger, Richard (2010). Me & Death: An Afterlife Adventure. Tundra. ISBN 9780887767968.
- Scrimger, Richard (2012). Ink Me. Seven. Orca. ISBN 9781459800168.
- Scrimger, Richard (2014). The Wolf and Me. Orca. ISBN 9781459805316.
- Scrimger, Richard (2016). Downside Up. Tundra. ISBN 9781770498457.
- Scrimger, Richard (2016). Lucky Jonah. HarperCollins. ISBN 9781443410717.
- Scrimger, Richard (2016). Weerdest Day Ever!. Seven Prequels. Orca. ISBN 9781459811553.
- Scrimger, Richard (2017). Zomboy. HarperCollins. ISBN 9781443410694.
- Jocelyn, Marthe; Scrimger, Richard (2017). Viminy Crowe's Comic Book. Illustrated by Claudia Dávila. Tundra. ISBN 9781101918937.
- Florence, Melanie; Scrimger, Richard (2022). Autumn Bird and the Runaway. Scholastic. ISBN 1443182869.
  - In the US: Florence, Melanie; Scrimger, Richard (2024). The Other Side of Perfect. Scholastic. ISBN 9781339002859.
- Scrimger, Richard (2019). The Almost Epic Squad: Irresistible. Illustrated by Britt Wilson. Scholastic. ISBN 9781443157889.
- Scrimger, Richard (2023). At the Speed of Gus. Scholastic. ISBN 9781443193122.
- Scrimger, Richard (2024). Your Story Matters: A Surprisingly Practical Guide to Writing. Illustrated by D. McFadzean. Tundra. ISBN 9781770498426.

==== The Nose from Jupiter series ====
- Scrimger, Richard (1998). The Nose From Jupiter. Tundra.
- Scrimger, Richard (2001). A Nose For Adventure. Tundra. ISBN 0-88776-499-1.
- Scrimger, Richard (2002). Noses Are Red. Tundra. ISBN 0-88776-610-2.
- Scrimger, Richard (2004). The Boy from Earth. Tundra. ISBN 9780887765919.

==== Picture books ====
- Scrimger, Richard (2001). Bun Bun's Birthday. Illustrated by Gillian Johnson. Tundra. ISBN 0887765203.
- Scrimger, Richard (2002). Princess Bun Bun. Illustrated by Gillian Johnson. Tundra. ISBN 0887765432.
- Scrimger, Richard (2003). Eugene's Story. Illustrated by Gillian Johnson. Tundra. ISBN 9780887765445.

=== Adult books ===
- Scrimger, Richard (1996). Crosstown. Riverbank Press. ISBN 9781896332017.
- Scrimger, Richard (1997). Still Life with Children: True Tales of Love, Laughter and Laundry. HarperCollins. ISBN 9780006384861.
- Scrimger, Richard (2000). Mystical Rose. Doubleday. ISBN 9780385259545.
