= Norah McClintock =

Canadian writer (1952–2017)

- Born: March 11, 1952; Montreal, Quebec, Canada
- Died: February 6, 2017 (aged 64); Toronto, Ontario, Canada
- Education: McGill University
- Spouse: Herman Rosenfeld
- Children: 2
- Writing career
- Genre: Young adult mystery
- Notable awards: Crime Writers of Canada Awards of Excellence (1996, 1998, 1999, 2002, 2003); Forest of Reading Red Maple Award (2004)

Norah McClintock (March 11, 1952 – February 6, 2017) was a Canadian writer of young adult fiction who published more than 60 books. She won five Crime Writers of Canada Awards of Excellence.

== Biography ==
McClintock was born March 11, 1952, in Pointe-Claire, Quebec, where she also grew up. She received a Bachelor of Arts in history and a graduate degree in medieval history from McGill University. She later lived in Toronto. She was a member of the Canadian Society of Children's Authors, Illustrators, and Performers and Crime Writers of Canada.

McClintock married Herman Rosenfeld and had two daughters: Quinn and Brooke.

She died of ovarian cancer on February 6, 2017.

== Awards and honours ==
Hit and Run and I, Witness are Junior Library Guild books.

=== 1990s ===
Awards for McClintock's writing, 1990–1999
| Year | Title | Category | Result | Ref. |
|---|---|---|---|---|
| 1995 | Jack's Back | Manitoba Young Readers’ Choice Award | Nominee | |
| 1996 | Mistaken Identity | Crime Writers of Canada Awards of Excellence: Best Juvenile or Young Adult Crime Book | Winner | |
| 1998 | The Body in the Basement | Crime Writers of Canada Awards of Excellence: Best Juvenile or Young Adult Crime Book | Winner | |
| 1998 | The Body in the Basement | Forest of Reading Red Maple Award | Finalist | |
| 1998 | Mistaken Identity | Manitoba Young Readers’ Choice Award | Nominee | |
| 1999 | Sins of the Father | Crime Writers of Canada Awards of Excellence: Best Juvenile or Young Adult Crime Book | Winner | |
| 1999 | Sins of the Father | Forest of Reading Red Maple Award | Finalist | |

=== 2000s ===
Awards for McClintock's writing, 2000–2009
| Year | Title | Category | Result | Ref. |
|---|---|---|---|---|
| 2000 | Body in the Basement | Manitoba Young Readers’ Choice Award | Nominee | |
| 2000 | Password: Murder | Forest of Reading Red Maple Award | Finalist | |
| 2001 | Over the Edge | Forest of Reading Red Maple Award | Finalist | |
| 2002 | Scared to Death | Crime Writers of Canada Awards of Excellence: Best Juvenile or Young Adult Crime Book | Winner | |
| 2003 | Break and Enter | Crime Writers of Canada Awards of Excellence: Best Juvenile or Young Adult Crime Book | Winner | |
| 2003 | Scared to Death | Manitoba Young Readers’ Choice Award | Nominee | |
| 2004 | Break and Enter | Manitoba Young Readers’ Choice Award | Nominee | |
| 2004 | Hit and Run | Forest of Reading Red Maple Award | Winner | |
| 2005 | Dead and Gone | Forest of Reading Red Maple Award | Finalist | |
| 2005 | No Escape | Manitoba Young Readers’ Choice Award | Nominee | |
| 2007 | Dooley Takes The Fall | White Pine Award | Nominee | |
| 2007 | Not a Trace Series | Forest of Reading Red Maple Award | Finalist | |
| 2007 | Tell | Quick Picks for Reluctant Young Adult Readers | Selection | |
| 2008 | Bang! | Quick Picks for Reluctant Young Adult Readers | Selection | |
| 2008 | Down! | Quick Picks for Reluctant Young Adult Readers | Selection | |
| 2009 | Out of the Cold | Forest of Reading Red Maple Award | Winner | |
| 2009 | Out of the Cold | Manitoba Young Readers’ Choice Award | Nominee | |

=== 2010s ===
Awards for McClintock's writing, 2010–2019
| Year | Title | Category | Result | Ref. |
|---|---|---|---|---|
| 2010 | Back | Crime Writers of Canada Awards of Excellence: Best Juvenile Crime Book | Nominee | |
| 2010 | Change of Heart | Crime Writers of Canada Awards of Excellence: Best Juvenile Crime Book | Nominee | |
| 2010 | Homicide Related | Crime Writers of Canada Awards of Excellence: Best Juvenile Crime Book | Shortlist | |
| 2010 | Nowhere to Turn | Crime Writers of Canada Awards of Excellence: Best Juvenile Crime Book | Nominee | |
| 2010 | Picture This | Crime Writers of Canada Awards of Excellence: Best Juvenile Crime Book | Nominee | |
| 2010 | Taken | Crime Writers of Canada Awards of Excellence: Best Juvenile Crime Book | Nominee | |
| 2011 | In Too Deep | Crime Writers of Canada Awards of Excellence: Best Juvenile Crime Book | Nominee | |
| 2011 | Masked | Crime Writers of Canada Awards of Excellence: Best Juvenile Crime Book | Nominee | |
| 2011 | Something to Prove | Crime Writers of Canada Awards of Excellence: Best Juvenile Crime Book | Nominee | |
| 2011 | Taken | Manitoba Young Readers’ Choice Award | Winner | |
| 2011 | Victim Rights | Crime Writers of Canada Awards of Excellence: Best Juvenile or Young Adult Crime Book | Shortlist | |
| 2011 | Victim Rights | ReLit Awards | Longlist | |
| 2012 | She Said/She Saw | Crime Writers of Canada Awards of Excellence: Best Juvenile Crime Book | Nominee | |
| 2012 | She Said/She Saw | Quick Picks for Reluctant Young Adult Readers | Selection | |
| 2013 | Guilty | Quick Picks for Reluctant Young Adult Readers | Selection | |
| 2014 | Guilty | Manitoba Young Readers’ Choice Award | Nominee | |
| 2015 | About That Night | Crime Writers of Canada Awards of Excellence: Best Juvenile or Young Adult Crime Book | Shortlist | |
| 2015 | About That Night | John Spray Mystery Award | Finalist | |
| 2016 | My Life Before Me | Crime Writers of Canada Awards of Excellence: Best Juvenile or Young Adult Crime Book | Nominee | |
| 2016 | Tru Detective | Crime Writers of Canada Awards of Excellence: Best Juvenile or Young Adult Crime Book | Nominee | |
| 2017 | Trial by Fire | Crime Writers of Canada Awards of Excellence: Best Juvenile or Young Adult Crime Book | Shortlist | |
| 2018 | Out of Tune | Crime Writers of Canada Awards of Excellence: Best Juvenile or Young Adult Crime Book | Nominee | |
| 2018 | Slide | Manitoba Young Readers’ Choice Award | Nominee | |

== Publications ==
=== Standalone mystery novels ===
- End of the Line, RFP Publications, 1981.
- Shakespeare and Legs, Scholastic Canada, 1987.
- Sixty-four, Sixty-five, McClelland & Stewart, 1989.
- The Stepfather Game, Scholastic Canada, 1990.
  - The Stepfather Game was revised and published as part of the "Chloe and Levesque" series as The Third Degree, 2005.
- Jack's Back, Scholastic Canada, 1992.
- Mistaken Identity, Scholastic Canada, 1995.
- The Body in the Basement, Scholastic Canada, 1997.
- Sins of the Father, Scholastic Canada, 1998.
- Password: Murder, Scholastic Canada, 1999.
- Snitch, Orca Book Publishers, 2005.
- Tell, Orca Book Publishers, 2006.
- Seeing and Believing, Scholastic Canada, 2006.
- Bang, Orca Book Publishers, 2007.

=== Chloe and Levesque series ===
The Chloe and Levesque series was published by Scholastic Canada.

- Over the Edge, 2000.
- Double Cross, 2000.
- Scared to Death, 2000.
- Break and Enter, 2002.
- No Escape, 2003.
- Not a Trace, 2005.

=== Mike and Riel series ===
- Hit and Run, 2003.
- Truth and Lies, 2004.
- Dead and Gone, 2004.

=== Robyn Hunter series ===
- Last Chance, 2006.
- You Can Run, 2006.
- Nothing to Lose, 2007.
- Out of the Cold, 2007.
- Shadow of Doubt, 2008.
- Nowhere to Turn, 2009.
- Change of Heart, 2009.
- In Too Deep, 2010.
- At the Edge, 2013.

=== Ryan Dooley Series ===
- 2007 — Dooley Takes The Fall
- 2009 — Homicide Related
