= Tim Wynne-Jones =

English–Canadian author of children's literature

Tim Wynne-Jones, OC (born 12 August 1948) is an English–Canadian author of children's literature, including picture books and novels for children and young adults, novels for adults, radio dramas, songs for the CBC/Jim Henson production Fraggle Rock, as well as a children's musical and an opera libretto.

For his contribution as a children's writer he was Canada's nominee for the biennial, international Hans Christian Andersen Medal in 2012.

== Biography ==
Born on August 12, 1948, in Bromborough, Cheshire, Great Britain, Wynne-Jones emigrated to Canada in 1952, and was raised in British Columbia and Ontario. He currently lives in Perth, Ontario.

Wynne-Jones was educated at the University of Waterloo and Yale University, after having graduated from Ridgemont High School in Ottawa, Ontario, Canada. An additional formative experience was his participation in the St Matthew's Anglican Church choir of men and boys, of which he was for a time the Head Chorister. He is a faculty member at Vermont College of Fine Arts, teaching in the Writing for Children and Young Adults MFA program.

== Writing ==
Tim Wynne-Jones' first book was Odd's End which is said to have been written over the space of five weeks while his wife was away. It was published By McClelland & Stewart in 1980 and won the $50,000 Seal First Novel Award. Since then, Wynne-Jones has written more than 20 books, including picture books, novels for children and young adults, as well as three novels for adults. His work has been widely reviewed and he has won several awards, including two Boston Globe–Horn Book Awards from The Horn Book Magazine for children's fiction published in the U.S. (1995, 2011); three Governor General's Literary Awards in Canada (1993, 1995, 2009); three Canadian Library Association Prizes; the Arthur Ellis Award from the Crime Writers of Canada (2001); and the Edgar Award for Young Adult Mystery from the Mystery Writers of America (2002).

== Works ==
=== Children's picture books ===
- Madeline and Ermadillo - 1976
- Zoom at Sea - 1983
- Zoom Away - 1985
- The Hour of the Frog - 1985
- I'll Make You Small - 1986
- Mischief City - 1986
- Architect of the Moon - 1988 (U.S. title: Builder of the Moon)
- Zoom Upstream - 1992
- The Last Piece of Sky - 1993
- Mouse In the Manger - 1993
- The Hunchback of Notre Dame - 1996
- Dracula - 1997
- On Tumbledown Hill - 1998
- Ned Mouse Breaks Away - 2002

=== Juvenile and Young adult fiction ===
- Some of the Kinder Planets - 1993
- Rosie Backstage - 1994 (with Amanda Lewis)
- The Book of Changes - 1994
- The Maestro - 1995 (Australian title: The Flight of Burl Crow, UK title The Survival Game)
- Stephen Fair - 1998
- Lord of the Fries and Other Stories - 1999
- The Boy in the Burning House - 2000 (Edgar Award for Best Young Adult Novel, 2002)
- A Midwinter Night's Dream - 2003 (Libretto, commissioned by the Canadian Children's Opera Chorus)
- A Thief in the House of Memory - 2004
- Rex Zero and the End of the World - 2007
- Rex Zero, King of Nothing - 2008
- The Uninvited - 2009
- Rex Zero, the Great Pretender - 2010
- Blink and Caution - 2011
- The Emperor of Any Place - 2015
- War at the Snow White Motel and Other Stories - 2020

=== Adult fiction ===
- Odd's End - 1980
- The Knot - 1983
- Fastyngange - 1988 (UK title: Voices)
- SilabGarza - 2010

=== Co-Authored ===
- Click - 2007

=== Radio plays ===
- "The Thinking Room" for CBC Radio's Nightfall - 1982
- "The Road Ends at the Sea" for CBC Radio's Nightfall - 1982
- "The Strange Odyssey of Lennis Freed" for CBC Radio's Nightfall - 1983

== Awards ==
- 1980 - Seal First Novel Award, Odd's End
- 1983 - Ruth Schwartz Award of The Canadian Book Sellers Association, Zoom at Sea
- 1993 - Governor General's Award for English language children's literature, Some of the Kinder Planets
- 1995 - Boston Globe–Horn Book Award for children's fiction, Some of the Kinder Planets
- 1995 - Governor General's Award for English language children's literature, The Maestro
- 1995 - Canadian Library Association Young Adult Book of the Year, The Maestro
- 1997 - Vicky Metcalf Award
- 1998 - Canadian Library Association Children's Book of the Year
- 2001 - Arthur Ellis Award, Best Juvenile Crime Book, The Boy in the Burning House
- 2002 - Edgar Award for Best Young Adult book, The Boy in the Burning House
- 2009 - Governor General's Award for English language children's literature, The Uninvited
- 2011 - Officer of the Order of Canada "for his contributions to Canadian literature, notably as a writer of children's fiction".
- 2011 - Boston Globe–Horn Book Award for children's fiction, Blink & Caution

== See also ==
- List of University of Waterloo people
