= Sylvia McNicoll =

Canadian children's writer

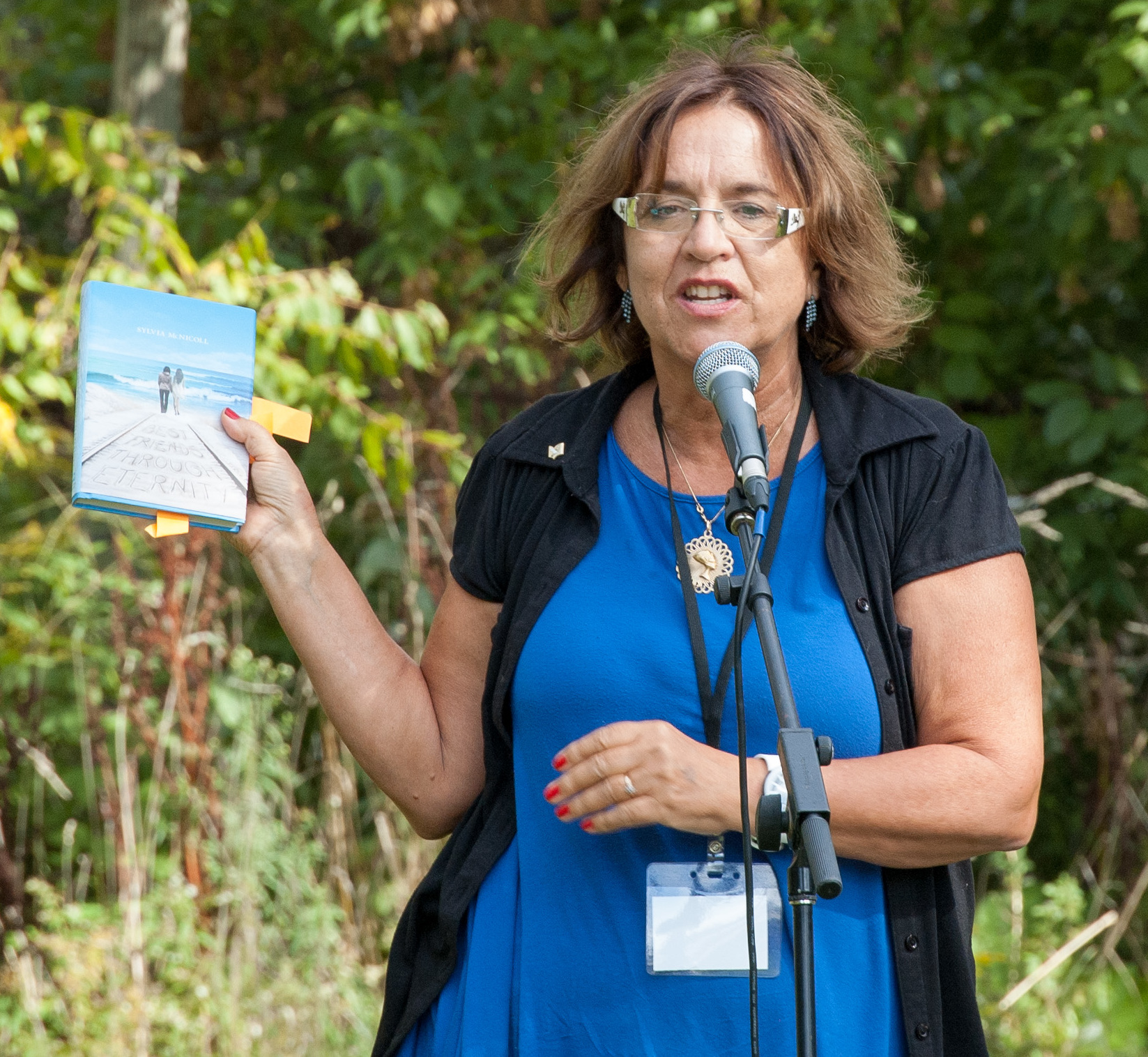
- McNicoll at the Eden Mills Writers' Festival in 2016
- Born: Ajax, Ontario, Canada
- Occupation: Writer

Sylvia McNicoll (born 1954) is a Canadian children's writer who lives in Burlington, Ontario.

McNicoll was born in Ajax, Ontario, and grew up in Montreal, Quebec. For eight years she worked as features editor for Today's Parent Toronto while she was writing her novels for young people. She also served as Artist in Residence for numerous schools in Ontario and Writer in Electronic Residence for schools across Canada.

Sylvia has written many books for young readers, including two high-interest, low-vocabulary novels for adolescents and teens, published by High Interest Publishing (HIP Books).

Sylvia McNicoll is married to Robert McNicoll and they have three adult children: Jennifer, Craig, and Robin.

== Awards ==
- 1996 Silver Birch for "Bringing Up Beauty"
- 1996 Manitoba Young Reader's Choice Award for "Bringing Up Beauty"
- 2000 Explora-toy Best Novel for "Caught in a Lie"
- 2007 Hamilton Arts Multimedia Award for "Beauty Returns",
- 2006 Korean War Veteran's Award (Hamilton Arts) for short article
- 2011 Creative Burlington's inaugural Arts Recognition Award
- 2012 Hamilton Arts Award for "Last Chance for Paris"
- 2019 Hamilton Literacy award for Fiction for "Body Swap"

== Bibliography ==
- Blueberries and Whipped Cream - 1988
- Jump Start - 1989
- The Tiger Catcher's Kid - 1989
- Project Disaster - 1990
- More than Money - 1990
- Facing the Enemy - 1992
- Bringing Up Beauty - 1994
- The Big Race - 1996
- Walking a Thin Line - 1997
- Double Dribble - 1999
- Smoky and the Gorilla - 1999
- Grave Secrets - 1999
- Caught in a Lie - 2000
- A Different Kind of Beauty - 2004
- Beauty Returns - 2006
- Last Chance For Paris - 2008
- crush. candy. corpse. - 2012
- Dying to Go Viral - 2013
- Dog on Trial - 2013
- Revenge on the Fly - 2014
- Best Friends Through Eternity - 2015
- The Best Mistake Mystery, 2017
- The Artsy Mistake Mystery, 2017
- The Snake Mistake Mystery, 2018
- Body Swap, 2018
