= Sigmund Brouwer =

Canadian author (born 1959)

- Born: 1959 (age 66–67)
- Occupation: Author
- Website: sigmundbrouwer.com

Sigmund Brouwer (born 1959) is a Canadian author of children's, young adult, and adult books. He has over 100 titles and four million books in print.

Brouwer's novel, Dead Man's Switch, won the Arthur Ellis Award in 2015 for Canada's best young adult mystery of the year. His adult novel, Thief of Glory, was Book of the Year for the Christy Awards and a winner of the Alberta Readers Choice Awards. The Last Disciple, co-authored by Hank Hanegraaf, was featured in Time magazine. His book Shock Wave won the 2025 Arthur Ellis Award.

== Early life and education ==
Brouwer is a Dutch Canadian, as his Dutch parents Willem and Gerda immigrated to Red Deer, Alberta following their childhood survival of World War II. Brouwer was born and raised in Red Deer, where he currently lives. Brouwer holds an undergraduate Commerce degree from Calvin College, as well as being a graduate of Carleton University's journalism program.

At the age of 22, Brouwer won the gold medal in the Canada Games for racquetball (doubles).

Brouwer wrote his first book when he was ten years old and began submitting his work to publishers when he was 20. After seven years, his first story was published in 1985 in Western Producer. His first published book was the first in the Accidental Detectives series.

== Personal life ==
Brouwer splits his time between Red Deer, Alberta and Nashville, Tennessee. He is divorced from Christian singer/songwriter Cindy Morgan, with whom he has two daughters.

== Works ==
Summary bibliography.

Nonfiction

- Rock & Roll Literacy (2011) (a guide for educators based on his school presentation program by the same name)

Novels

- Blades of Valor (2014) (Book 4 in the Merlin's Immortals series)
- Broken Angel (2009)
- The Canary List (2011)
- Dead Man's Switch (2014)
- Flight of Shadows (2010)
- Fortress of Mist (2013) (Book 2 in the Merlin's Immortals series)
- The Last Disciple (2012) (co-authored by Hank Hanegraaf)
- Martyr's Fire (2013) (Book 3 in the Merlin's Immortals series)
- Nowhere to Hide (2015)
- The Orphan King (2012) (Book 1 in the Merlin's Immortals series)
- Saffire (2016)
- Thief of Glory (2014)

Young adult and children's books

- Absolute Pressure (2009)
- All-Star Pride (2006)
- Ambush (2012) (Book 3 in the Robot Wars series)
- Barracuda (2016)
- Billboard Express (2016)
- Blazer Drive (2007)
- Chief Honor (2008)
- Clan (2021)
- Cobra Strike (2007)
- Counterattack (2012) (Book 4 in the Robot Wars series)
- Creature of the Mists (1991) (Book 6 in the Accidental Detectives series)
- Death Trap (2009) (Book 1 in the Robot Wars series)
- Devil's Pass (2012)
- The Disappearing Jewel of Madagascar (1990) (Book 4 in the Accidental Detectives series)
- Double Cross (2009) (Book 2 in the Robot Wars series)
- Escalate (2018)
- Final Battle (2012) (Book 5 in the Robot Wars series)
- Heavy Freight (2017)
- Hitmen Triumph (2007)
- Hurricane Power (2007)
- Hush, Puppy (2022) (Book 3 in the Charlie's Rules series)
- Innocent Heroes: Stories of Animals in the First World War (2020)
- Justine McKeen and the Bird Nerd (2013)
- Justine McKeen, Bottle Throttle (2016)
- Justine McKeen, Eat Your Beets (2013)
- Justine McKeen, Thermostat Chat (2017)
- Justine McKeen, Pooper Scooper (2012)
- Justine McKeen, Queen of Green (2011)
- Justine McKeen, Walk the Talk (2012)
- Justine McKeen vs. the Queen of Mean (2014)
- Lost Beneath Manhattan (1990) (Accidental Detectives series)
- Mars Diaries (2000–02)
- Madness at Moonshiner's Bay (1992) (Accidental Detectives)
- Maverick Mania (2008)
- The Missing Map of Pirate's Haven (1991) (Book 5 in the Accidental Detectives series)
- The Mystery Tribe of Camp Blackeagle (1990) (Book 2 in the Accidental Detectives series)
- Oil King Courage (2009)
- Pasture Bedtime (2021) (Book 1 in the Charlie's Rules series)
- Phantom Outlaw at Wolf Creek (Book 3 in the Accidental Detectives series)
- Race for the Park Street Treasure (1991) (Accidental Detectives series)
- Rebel Glory (2006)
- Rock the Boat (2015)
- Ruff Day (2021) (Book 2 in the Charlie's Rules series)
- Scarlet Thunder (2008)
- Sewer Rats (2006)
- Shortcuts (1993) (Accidental Detectives series)
- Sunrise at the Mayan Temple (1992) (Book 10 in the Accidental Detectives series)
- Terror on Kamikaze Run (Accidental Detectives series)
- Thunderbird Spirit (2008) (Lightning on Ice series)
- Tiger Threat (2006)
- Timberwolf Challenge (2008)
- Timberwolf Chase (2006)
- Timberwolf Hunt (2007)
- Timberwolf Prey (2010)
- Timberwolf Revenge (2006)
- Timberwolf Rivals (2009)
- Timberwolf Tracks (2009)
- Timberwolf Trap (2007)
- Tin Soldier (2014)
- Titan Clash (2007)
- Trapped (2022)
- True Blue (2018) (co-authored by Cindy Morgan)
- Tyrant of the Badlands (1996) (Book 13 in the Accidental Detectives series)
- Unleashed (2015)
- Winter Hawk Star (2007)
- Wired (2020)
