= Blue Spruce Award =

Canadian literary award

The Blue Spruce Award is an award in the Ontario Library Association (OLA) Forest of Reading Awards. The Blue Spruce Award celebrates English-language Canadian picture books for grades Kindergarten to grade 2 (ages 5–8) every year. Out of ten nominated books in each category students must read a minimum of five to vote for their favourite. The winner is chosen by the most popular book in all participating libraries, schools, groups, etc. The Blue Spruce Award was established in 2002. A French-language version of the Forest of Reading prize for picture books is Le prix Peuplier.

== Award winners ==
=== 2002–2009 ===
Award winners and finalists, 2002–2009
Year	Author(s)	Illustrator(s)	Title	Result	Ref.
2002	Valerie Coulman	Rogé Girard	When Pigs Fly	Winner	
2002	Linda Bailey	Alan Daniel, Lea Daniel, and Heather Collins	The Best Figure Skater in the Whole Wide World	Finalist	
2002	Paulette Bourgeois	Stephane Jorisch	Oma's Quilt	Finalist	
2002	Sarah Ellis	Kim LaFave	Big Ben	Finalist	
2002	Sheree Fitch	Janet Wilson	No Two Snowflakes	Finalist	
2002	Tomson Highway	John Rombough	Caribou Song	Finalist	
2002	Jonathan London	Paul Morin	What the Animals Were Waiting For	Finalist	
2002	Andrea Spalding	Leslie Elizabeth Watts	It's Raining, It's Pouring	Finalist	
2002	Margriet Ruurs	Barbara Spurll	Emma's Cold Day	Finalist	
2002	Mike Ulmer	Melanie Rose	M is for Maple	Finalist	
2003	Matthew M. Napier	Melanie Rose	Z is for Zamboni	Winner	
2003	Wallace Edwards		Alphabeasts	Finalist	
2003	Marie-Louise Gay		Stella, Fairy of the Forest	Finalist	
2003	Celia Godkin		When the Giant Stirred	Finalist	
2003	Troon Harrison	Zhong-Yang Huang	Courage to Fly	Finalist	
2003	Robin Muller		Badger's New House	Finalist	
2003	Marilynn Reynolds	Don Kilby	The Name of the Child	Finalist	
2003	Joanne Taylor	Susan Tooke	Full Moon Rising	Finalist	
2003	Jan Thornhill		The Rumor	Finalist	
2003	Frieda Wishinsky	Dean Griffiths	Give Maggie a Chance	Finalist	
2004	Linda Bailey	Bill Salvin	Stanley's Party	Winner	
2004	Jane Barclay, Kathryn Cole (Note: Editor.)	Janice Donato	How Hot Was It?	Finalist	
2004	Karleen Bradford	Leslie Elizabeth Watts	You Can't Rush a Cat	Finalist	
2004	Anne Laurel Carter	Rose Cowles	The F Team	Finalist	
2004	Valerie Coulman	Rogé (Note: Also translator.)	Sink or Swim	Finalist	
2004	Phoebe Gilman		Jillian Jiggs and the Great Big Snow	Finalist	
2004	Shenaaz Nanji	Chum McLeod	An Alien in My House	Finalist	
2004	Susin Nielsen-Fernlund	Louise-Andrée Laliberté	Hank and Fergus	Finalist	
2004	Barbara Reid		The Subway Mouse	Finalist	
2004	Vlasta van Kampen		It Couldn't Be Worse	Finalist	
2005	Robert Heidbreder	Bill Slavin & Esperanca Melo	Drumheller Dinosaur Dance	Winner	
2005	Aubrey Davis	Duesan Petriecic	Bagels from Benny	Finalist	
2005	Dorothy Joan Harris	Kim LaFave	A Very Unusual Dog	Finalist	
2005	Hazel J. Hutchins	Ruth Ohi	The Sidewalk Rescue	Finalist	
2005	Lynn Manuel	Kasia Charki	Camels Always Do	Finalist	
2005	Sheryl McFarlane	Chrissie Wysotski	This is the Dog	Finalist	
2005	Gilles Tibo	Bruno St-Aubin	Too Many Books!	Finalist	
2005	Maxine Trottier & Brian Deines		Our Canadian Flag	Finalist	
2005	Troy Wilson	Dean Griffiths	Perfect Man	Finalist	
2005	Chieri Uegaki	Stéphane Jorisch	Suki's Kimono	Finalist	
2006	George Elliott	Andrej Krystoforski	The Boy Who Loved Bananas	Winner	
2006	Sean Cassidy		Gummytoes	Finalist	
2006	Sarah Ellis	Kim LaFave	Ben Over Night	Finalist	
2006	Marie-Louise Gay		Stella, Princess of the Sky	Finalist	
2006	Maureen Hull	Leanne Franson	Rainy Days with Bear	Finalist	
2006	Hazel J. Hutchins	Ruth Ohi	Beneath the Bridge	Finalist	
2006	Laura Langston	Lindsey Gardiner	Mile-High Apple Pie	Finalist	
2006	Stehpanie Simpson McLellan	Dianna Bonder	Leon's Song	Finalist	
2006	Evan Solomon	Bill Slavin	Bigbeard's Hook	Finalist	
2006	Sheri Radford	Christine Tripp	Penelope and the Humongous Burp	Finalist	
2007	Mélanie Watt		Scaredy Squirrel	Winner	
2007	Linda Bailey	Bill Slavin	Stanley's Wild Ride	Finalist	
2007	Lili Chartrand, Susan Ouriou (Note: Translator.)	Rogé Girard	Taming Horrible Harry	Finalist	
2007	Don Gillmor	Michael Martchenko	Sophie and the Sea Monster	Finalist	
2007	Susan Hughes	Stephane Poulin	Earth to Audrey	Finalist	
2007	Ruth Ohi		Clara and the Bossy	Finalist	
2007	Sheri Radford	Christine Tripp	Penelope and the Monsters	Finalist	
2007	Margriet Ruurs	Sean Cassidy	Wake Up, Henry Rooster!	Finalist	
2007	Colleen Sydor	Pascale Constantin	Camilla Chameleon	Finalist	
2007	Gilles Tibo	Bruno St-Aubin	Where's My Hockey Sweater?	Finalist	
2008	Melanie Watt		Scaredy Squirrel Makes a Friend	Winner	
2008	Barbara Reid		Fox Walked Alone	Finalist	
2008	Jeremy Tankard		Grumpy Bird	Finalist	
2008	Margriet Ruurs	Ron Broda	In My Backyard	Finalist	
2008	Linda Bailey	Bill Slavin	The Farm Team	Finalist	
2008	Kari-Lynn Winters	Ben Hodson	Jeffery and Sloth	Finalist	
2008	Rebecca Upjohn	Renne Benoit	Lily and the Paper Man	Finalist	
2008	Hazel Hutchins	Maria van Lieshout	The List	Finalist	
2008	Frieda Wishinsky	Marie-Louise Gay	Please, Louise!	Finalist	
2008	Debby Waldman	Cindy Revell	A Sack Full of Feathers	Finalist	
2009	Mélanie Watt		Chester	Winner	
2009	Carolyn Beck	Andrea Beck	Buttercup's Lovely Day	Finalist	
2009	Chris Mizzoni		Clancy with the Puck	Finalist	
2009	Anne Cottringer & Alex T. Smith		Eliot Jones, Midnight Superhero	Finalist	
2009	Pamela Hickman	Geraldo Valéro	It's Moving Day!	Finalist	
2009	Rachna Gilmore	Leslie Elizabeth Watts	Making Grizzie Grow	Finalist	
2009	Hazel Hutchins & Gail Herbert	Dusan Petricic	Mattland	Finalist	
2009	Linda Bailey	Bill Slavin	Stanley At Sea	Finalist	
2009	Cary Fagan	Dusan Petricic	My New Shirt	Finalist	
2009	Dan Bar-el	John Manders	Such a Prince	Finalist	

=== 2010–2019 ===
Award winners and finalists, 2010–2019
Year	Author(s)	Illustrator(s)	Title	Result	Ref.
2010	Jeremy Tankard		Boo Hoo Bird	Winner	
2010	Tim Beiser	Rachel Berman	Bradley McGogg	Finalist	
2010	Robert Heidbreder & Rae Mate		Crocodiles Play	Finalist	
2010	Beth Cruikshank	Lynn Johnston	Farley Follows His Nose	Finalist	
2010	Katarina Jovanovic	Philippe Beha	The King Has Goat Ears	Finalist	
2010	Kenneth Oppel	Steve Johnson & Lou Fancher	The King's Taster	Finalist	
2010	Linda Bailey	Bill Slavin	Stanley's Beauty Contest	Finalist	
2010	Valerie Sherrard	David Jardine	There's a Cow Under My Bed	Finalist	
2010	Marie-Louise Gay		When Stella Was Very, Very Small	Finalist	
2010	Frieda Wishinsky & Kady MacDonald Denton		You're Mean, Lily Jean	Finalist	
2011	Dave Whamond		My Think-A-ma-Jink	Winner	
2011	Nicholas Oldland		Big Bear Hug	Finalist	
2011	Sharon Jennings	Ashley Spires	C'mere, Boy!	Finalist	
2011	Mélanie Watt		Have I Got a Book for You!	Finalist	
2011	Andrew Larsen	Irene Luxbacher	The Imaginary Garden	Finalist	
2011	Christina Leist		Jack the Bear	Finalist	
2011	Barbara Reid & Ian Crysler		Perfect Snow	Finalist	
2011	Jane Barclay	Renne Benoit	Proud as a Peacock, Brave as a Lion	Finalist	
2011	Tania Duprey Stehlik	Vanja Vuleta Jovanovic	Violet	Finalist	
2011	Lana Button	Tania Howells	Willow's Whispers	Finalist	
2012	Rebecca Bender		Giraffe and Bird	Winner	
2012	Sarah Tsiang	Qin Leng	A Flock of Shoes	Finalist	
2012	Heather McLeod	Brooke Kerrigan	Kiss Me! (I'm a Prince!)	Finalist	
2012	Michael Nicoll Yahgulanaas & Wangari Maathai (Note: Afterword)		The Little Hummingbird	Finalist	
2012	Nicholas Oldland		Making the Moose Out of Life	Finalist	
2012	Heather Hartt-Sussman	Geneviève Côté	Noni Says No	Finalist	
2012	David Ward & Brian Deines		One Hockey Night	Finalist	
2012	Marie-Louise Gay		Roslyn Rutabaga and the Biggest Hole on Earth!	Finalist	
2012	Ashley Spires		Small Saul	Finalist	
2012	Linda Bailey	Bill Slavin	Stanley's Little Sister	Finalist	
2013	Martin Springett	Isobel Springett (Note: Photographer)	Kate and Pippin	Winner	
2013	Nicholas Oldland		The Busy Beaver	Finalist	
2013	Rebecca Bender		Don't Laugh at a Giraffe	Finalist	
2013	Cary Fagan	Geneviève Côté	Ella May and the Wishing Stone	Finalist	
2013	Heather Hartt-Sussman	Georgia Graham	Here Comes Hortense!	Finalist	
2013	Jane Barclay	Esperança Melo	JoJo the Giant	Finalist	
2013	Ashley Spires		Larf	Finalist	
2013	Émilie Rivard	Anne-Claire Delisle	Really and Truly	Finalist	
2013	Kevin Sylvester		Splinters	Finalist	
2013	Elin Kelsey	Soyeon Kim	You Are Stardust	Finalist	
2014	Dave Whamond		Oddrey	Winner	
2014	Alma Fullerton	Karen Patkau	A Good Trade	Finalist	
2014	Helene Boudreau	Serge Bloch	I Dare You Not to Yawn	Finalist	
2014	Elly MacKay		If You Hold a Seed	Finalist	
2014	Andrew Larsen	Dusan Petricic	In the Tree House	Finalist	
2014	Cary Fagan	Dusan Petricic	Mr. Zinger's Hat	Finalist	
2014	Peter H. Reynolds		Sky Color	Finalist	
2014	Jon Klassen		This is Not My Hat	Finalist	
2014	Wallace Edwards		Uncle Wally's Old Brown Shoe	Finalist	
2014	Lana Button	Tania Howells	Willow Finds a Way	Finalist	
2015	Maureen Fergus	Mike Lowery	The Day My Mom Came to Kindergarten	Winner	
2015	Roy MacGregor	Geneviève Després	The Highest Number in the World	Finalist	
2015	Ruth Ohi		Kenta and the Big Wave	Finalist	
2015	Anne Villenueve		Loula is Leaving for Africa	Finalist	
2015	Kathy Stinson	Dusan Petricic	The Man with the Violin	Finalist	
2015	Christine Baldacchino	Isabelle Malenfant	Morris Micklewhite and the Tangerine Dress	Finalist	
2015	Ashley Spires		The Most Magnificent Thing	Finalist	
2015	Jessica Young	Catia Chien	My Blue is Happy	Finalist	
2015	Dave Whamond		Oddrey and the New Kid	Finalist	
2015	Frank Viva		Young Frank, Architect	Finalist	
2016	Linda Bailey	David Huyck	If Kids Ruled the World	Winner	
2016	Elly MacKay		Butterfly Park	Finalist	
2016	Michael Moniz		The Cardinal and the Crow	Finalist	
2016	Colleen Sydor	Brooke Kerrigan	Fishermen Through and Through	Finalist	
2016	Sandra Bradley	Sara Palacios	Henry Holton Takes the Ice	Finalist	
2016	Alma Fullerton	Brian Deines	In a Cloud of Dust	Finalist	
2016	Sangeeta Bhadra	Marion Arbona	Sam's Pet Temper	Finalist	
2016	Heather Tekavec	Pierre Pratt	Stop, Thief!	Finalist	
2016	Claudia Dávila		Super Red Riding Hood	Finalist	
2016	Nancy Wilcox Richards	Tom Goldsmith	We're All Friends Here	Finalist	
2017	Terry Fan & Eric Fan		The Night Gardener	Winner	
2017	Shane Peacock	Sophie Casson	The Artist and Me	Finalist	
2017	Kyo Maclear	Marion Arbona	The Good Little Book	Finalist	
2017	Kathy Stinson	Qin Leng	Harry and Walter	Finalist	
2017	Vikki VanSickle	Cale Atkinson	If I Had a Gryphon	Finalist	
2017	Maureen Fergus	Dusan Petricic	InvisiBill	Finalist	
2017	Hazel Hutchins	Dusan Petricic	Snap!	Finalist	
2017	Danielle Daniel		Sometimes I Feel Like a Fox	Finalist	
2017	Linda Bailey	Bill Slavin	Stanley at School	Finalist	
2017	Willow Dawson		The Wolf-Birds	Finalist	
2018	Jess Keating	Marta Álvarez Miguéns	Shark Lady	Winner	
2018	Mireille Messier	Pierre Pratt	The Branch	Finalist	
2018	Chris Hadfield & Kate Fillion		The Darkest Dark	Finalist	
2018	Shelly Becker	Eda Kaban	Even Superheroes Have Bad Days	Finalist	
2018	Kari-Lynn Winters	Francois Thisdale	French Toast	Finalist	
2018	Lauri Holomis, Glen Gretzky, Wayne Gretzky (Note: Foreword)	Kevin Sylvester	Great	Finalist	
2018	Carolyn Huizinga Mills	Brooke Kerrigan	Little Boy Who Lived Down the Drain	Finalist	
2018	Bree Galbraith	Josee Bisaillon	Milo and Georgie	Finalist	
2018	Roselynn Akulukjuk		The Owl and the Lemming	Finalist	
2018	Andrew Larsen	Mike Lowery	A Squiggly Story	Finalist	
2019	Pierre Collet-Derby		Barnaby Never Forgets	Winner	
2019	Jessica Scott Kerrin	Qin Leng	The Better Tree Fort	Finalist	
2019	Jean Little	Joel Weissmann	Harry's Hiccups	Finalist	
2019	Belle DeMont	Sonja Wimmer	I Love My Purse	Finalist	
2019	Leanne Shirtliffe	Lorenzo Montatore	I Love Sharks, Too!	Finalist	
2019	Zachary Hyman	Joe Bluhm	The Magician's Secret	Finalist	
2019	Deborah Kerbel	Suzanne Del Rizzo	Sun Dog	Finalist	
2019	Kari Rust		Tricky	Finalist	
2019	Aviaq Johnston	Tim Mack	What's My Superpower?	Finalist	
2019	Cale Atkinson		Where Oliver Fits	Finalist	

=== 2020–2025 ===
Award winners and finalists, 2020–2025
Year	Author(s)	Illustrator(s)	Title	Result	Ref.
2020	Andrée Poulin	Félix Girard	That's Not Hockey!	Winner	
2020	Anne Renaud & Leanne Franson		Emma's Gems	Finalist	
2020	Rebecca Bender		Giraffe and Bird Together Again	Finalist	
2020	Kit Pearson & Katherine Farris	Gabrielle Grimard	The Magic Boat	Finalist	
2020	Heather Smith	Brooke Kerrigan	A Plan for Pops	Finalist	
2020	Kerry Lyn Sparrow	Guillaume Perreault	Sheep, Sheep!	Finalist	
2020	Andrew Larsen	Anne Villeneuve	Me, Toma and the Concrete Garden	Finalist	
2020	Marie-Louise Gay		Mustafa	Finalist	
2020	Maureen Fergus	Elina Ellis	The Reptile Club	Finalist	
2020	Helaine Becker	Orbie	Sloth at the Zoom	Finalist	
2021	Mike Boldt		Bad Dog	Winner	
2021	Peter H. Reynolds		Be You!	Finalist	
2021	Kim Smith		Boxitects	Finalist	
2021	Heather O'Connor & Claudia Davila		Fast Friends	Finalist	
2021	Sherry J. Lee	Charlene Chua	Going Up!	Finalist	
2021	Rina Singh	Ellen Rooney	Grandmother School	Finalist	
2021	Sennah Yee	Elaine Chen	My Day with Gong Gong	Finalist	
2021	Ibtihaj Muhammad, S. K. Ali (Note: As told to)	Hatem Aly	The Proudest Blue	Finalist	
2021	Danny Ramadan	Anna Bron	Salma the Syrian Chef	Finalist	
2021	Hazel Hutchins & Gail Herbert	Dusan Petricic	The Truth About Wind	Finalist	
2022	Peggy Collins		Harley the Hero	Winner	
2022	Sara de Wall	Erika Medina	48 Grasshopper Estates	Finalist	
2022	Bonnie Sherr Klein	Élisabeth Eudes-Pascal	Beep Beep Bubble	Finalist	
2022	Nhung N. Tran-Davies	Ravy Puth	The Doll	Finalist	
2022	Bahram Rahman	Gabrielle Grimard	The Library Bus	Finalist	
2022	Nadia L. Hohn	Irene Luxbacher	Malaika's Surprise	Finalist	
2022	Alma Fullerton		No More Plastic	Finalist	
2022	Stephanie Simpson McLellan	Zoe Si	The Sorry Life of Timothy Shmoe	Finalist	
2022	Jeffrey Ansloos & Shezza Ansloos	Joshua Mangeshig Pawis-Steckley	Thunder and the Noise Storms	Finalist	
2022	Monique Gray Smith	Nicole Neidhardt	When We Are Kind	Finalist	
2023	Monica Arnaldo		Are You a Cheeseburger?	Winner	
2023	Leonarda Carranza	Rafael Mayani	Abuelita and Me	Finalist	
2023	Leona Prince & Gabrielle Prince	Carla Joseph	Be a Good Ancestor	Finalist	
2023	Mahak Jain	Anu Chouhan	Bharatanatyam in Ballet Shoes	Finalist	
2023	Dane Liu	Lynn Scurfield	Friends Are Friends, Forever	Finalist	
2023	Sadé Smith	Ken Daley	Granny's Kitchen	Finalist	
2023	Tina Athaide	Åsa Gilland	Meena's Mindful Moment	Finalist	
2023	Nan Forler	Yong Ling Kang	Rodney Was a Tortoise	Finalist	
2023	Bahram Rahman & Peggy Collins		A Sky-Blue Bench	Finalist	
2023	Anoosha Syed		That's Not My Name!	Finalist	
2024	Sarabeth Holden	Emma Pedersen	Benny the Bananasaurus Rex	Winner	
2024	Sandra Bradley	Gabrielle Grimard	Cocoa Magic	Finalist	
2024	Lindsay Zier-Vogel	Caroline Bonne-Muller	Dear Street	Finalist	
2024	Esi Edugyan	Amélie Dubois	Garden of Lost Socks	Finalist	
2024	Naseem Hrab	Kelly Collier	How to Party Like a Snail	Finalist	
2024	Ibtihaj Muhammad & S. K. Ali	Hatem Aly	The Kindest Red	Finalist	
2024	Shauntay Grant	Kitt Thomas	My Fade is Fresh	Finalist	
2024	Kuljinder Kaur Brar	Samrath Kaur	My Name is Saajin Singh	Finalist	
2024	Maureen Fergus	Danesh Mohiuddin	Princess Pru and the Ogre on the Hill	Finalist	
2024	Jack Wong		The Words We Share	Finalist	
2025	Anoosha Syed		Lost Stick	Winner	
2025	Sakshi Mangal		Asha and the Toymaker	Finalist	
2025	Flo Leung		The Blue Bowl	Finalist	
2025	Lisa Wyzlic	Rebecca Syracuse	Harold the Iceberg Melts Down	Finalist	
2025	Bahram Rahman	Gabrielle Grimard	If You See a Bluebird	Finalist	
2025	Yewande Daniel-Ayoade	Ken Daley	The Little Regent	Finalist	
2025	Kuljinder Kaur Brar	Samrath Kaur	Mandeep's Cloudy Days	Finalist	
2025	Roz MacLean		More Than Words	Finalist	
2025	Sylv Chiang	Mathias Ball	Still My Tessa	Finalist	
2025	Brittany Luby	Natasha Donovan	When the Stars Came Home	Finalist	
