= Norma Fleck Award =

Literary award

Norma Fleck Award for Canadian Children's Non-Fiction
- Description: Excellence in Canadian non-fiction books for youth
- Country: Canada
- Presented by: Canadian Children's Book Centre & Fleck Family Foundation
- Reward: CDN$10,000
- Website: bookcentre.ca/pages/ccbc-book-awards

The Norma Fleck Award for Canadian Children's Non-Fiction is a lucrative literary award founded in May 1999 by the Fleck Family Foundation and the Canadian Children's Book Centre, and presented to the year's best non-fiction book for a youth audience. Each year's winner receives CDN$10,000.

The award is one of several presented by the Canadian Children's Book Centre each year; others include the Marilyn Baillie Picture Book Award, the Geoffrey Bilson Award for Historical Fiction for Young People and the TD Canadian Children's Literature Award.

The award was discontinued after 2023, with a new Sharon Fitzhenry Award for Children's Nonfiction to be presented beginning in 2025.

== Awards and winners ==
Norma Fleck Award winners and finalists
Year	Author	Title	Result	Ref.
1999	Andy Turnbull and Debora Pearson	By Truck to the North: My Winter Adventure	Winner	
1999	Gena K. Gorrell	Catching Fire: The Story of Firefighting	Finalist	
1999	Barbara Greenwood	The Last Safehouse: A Story of the Underground Railroad	Finalist	
1999	Larry Verstraete	Accidental Discoveries: From Laughing Gas to Dynamite	Finalist	
1999	Mary Wallace	The Inuksuk Book	Finalist	
2000	Simon Tookoome and Sheldon Oberman	The Shaman's Nephew: A Life in the Far North	Winner	
2000	Sarah Ellis	The Young Writer's Companion	Finalist	
2000	Linda Maybarduk	The Dancer Who Flew: A Memoir of Rudolf Nureyev	Finalist	
2000	Irene Morck	Five Pennies: A Prairie Boy's Story	Finalist	
2001	Gena K. Gorrell	Heart and Soul: The Story of Florence Nightingale	Winner	
2001	Linda Granfield	Pier 21: Gateway of Hope	Finalist	
2001	Ann Love and Jane Drake	The Kids Book of the Far North	Finalist	
2001	Ronald Orenstein	New Animal Discoveries	Finalist	
2001	Candace Savage	Born to be a Cowgirl: A Spirited Ride Through the Old West	Finalist	
2002	Jack Batten	The Man Who Ran Faster Than Everyone: The Story of Tom Longboat	Winner	
2002	Karen Levine	Hana's Suitcase	Finalist	
2002	Susan Musgrave	Nerves Out Loud: Critical Moments in the Lives of Seven Teen Girls	Finalist	
2002	Jane Pavanel	The Sex Book: An Alphabet of Smarter Love	Finalist	
2002	John Wilson	Righting Wrongs: The Story of Norman Bethune	Finalist	
2003	Larry Loyie with Constance Brissenden	As Long as the Rivers Flow	Winner	
2003	Kathy Conlan	Under the Ice	Finalist	
2003	Chan Hon Goh with Cary Fagan	Beyond the Dance: A Ballerina's Life	Finalist	
2003	Candace Savage	Wizards: An Amazing Journey through the Last Great Age of Magic	Finalist	
2003	Roderick Stewart	Wilfrid Laurier: A Pledge for Canada	Finalist	
2004	Val Ross	The Road to There: Mapmakers and Their Stories	Winner	
2004	Nicolas Debon	Four Pictures by Emily Carr	Finalist	
2004	Anne Dublin	Bobbie Rosenfeld: The Olympian Who Could Do Everything	Finalist	
2004	Reva Marin	Oscar: The Life and Music of Oscar Peterson	Finalist	
2004	John Wilson	Discovering the Arctic: The Story of John Rae	Finalist	
2005	Shari Graydon	In Your Face: The Culture of Beauty and You	Winner	
2005	Hazel Hutchins	A Second Is a Hiccup	Finalist	
2005	Marthe Jocelyn	A Home for Foundlings	Finalist	
2005	Kathy Kacer	The Underground Reporters	Finalist	
2005	Ange Zhang	Red Land, Yellow River: A Story from the Cultural Revolution	Finalist	
2006	Bill Slavin and Jim Slavin	Transformed: How Everyday Things Are Mad	Winner	
2006	Deborah Ellis	Our Stories, Our Songs: African Children Talk About AIDS	Finalist	
2006	Nadja Halilbegovich	My Childhood Under Fire: A Sarajevo Diary	Finalist	
2006	Susan Hughes	Coming to Canada: Building a Life in a New Land	Finalist	
2006	Kathy Kacer	Hiding Edith: A True Story	Finalist	
2007	Jan Thornhill	I Found a Dead Bird: The Kids' Guide to the Cycle of Life & Death	Winner	
2007	Barbara Greenwood	Factory Girl	Finalist	
2007	Celia Godkin	Fire! The Renewal of a Forest	Finalist	
2007	Jane Springer	Genocide	Finalist	
2007	Herb Shoveller	Ryan and Jimmy: And the Well in Africa That Brought Them Together	Finalist	
2008	Hugh Brewster	At Vimy Ridge: Canada's Greatest World War I Victory	Winner	
2008	Robert Bateman with Nancy Kovacs, illus. by Robert Bateman	Birds of Prey: An Introduction	Finalist	
2008	Sue Ann Alderson, illus. by Millie Ballance	The Eco-Diary of Kiran Singer	Finalist	
2008	Jan Thornhill	This Is My Planet: The Kids' Guide to Global Warming	Finalist	
2008	Kate Evans	Weird Weather: Everything You Didn't Want to Know About Climate Change but Probably Should Find Out	Finalist	
2009	Mariatu Kamara with Susan McClelland	The Bite of the Mango	Winner	
2009	Mary Wallace	Inuksuk Journey: An Artist at the Top of the World	Finalist	
2009	Susan Hughes, illus. by Willow Dawson	No Girls Allowed: Tales of Daring Women Dressed As Men for Love, Freedom and Adventure	Finalist	
2009	Katie Smith Milway, illus. by Eugenie Fernandes	One Hen: How One Small Loan Made a Big Difference	Finalist	
2009	Elizabeth MacLeod	Royal Murder: The Deadly Intrigue of Ten Sovereigns	Finalist	
2010	Priscilla Galloway with Dawn Hunter	Adventures on the Ancient Silk Road	Winner	
2010	Charis Cotter	Born to Write: The Remarkable Lives of Six Famous Authors	Finalist	
2010	William Gilkerson	A Thousand Years of Pirates	Finalist	
2010	Kathy Kacer and Sharon E. McKay	Whispers from the Ghettos	Finalist	
2010	Scot Ritchie	Follow That Map! A First Book of Mapping Skills	Finalist	
2011	Susan Hughes	Case Closed? Nine Mysteries Unlocked by Modern Science	Winner	
2011	Hadley Dyer	Watch This Space: Designing, Defending and Sharing Public Spaces	Finalist	
2011	Elin Kelsey	Not Your Typical Book About the Environment	Finalist	
2011	Daniel Loxton	Evolution: How We and All Living Things Came to Be	Finalist	
2011	Jody Nyasha Warner	Viola Desmond Won't Be Budged	Finalist	
2012	Susan Vande Griek	Loon	Winner	
2012	Rafal Gerszak with Dawn Hunter	Beyond Bullets: A Photo Journal of Afghanistan	Finalist	
2012	Susan Hughes	Off to Class: Incredible and Unusual Schools Around the World	Finalist	
2012	Marthe Jocelyn	Scribbling Women: True Tales from Astonishing Lives	Finalist	
2012	Dora Lee, illus. by Margot Thompson	Biomimicry: Inventions Inspired by Nature	Finalist	
2013	Deborah Ellis	Kids of Kabul: Living Bravely Through a Never-Ending War	Winner	
2013	Deborah Hodge	Rescuing the Children: The Story of the Kindertransport	Finalist	
2013	Monica Kulling	Going Up! Elisha Otis's Trip to the Top	Finalist	
2013	Bill Swan	Real Justice: Fourteen and Sentenced to Death – The Story of Steven Truscott	Finalist	
2014	Rona Arato	The Last Train: A Holocaust Story	Winner	
2014	Deborah Ellis	Looks Like Daylight: Voices of Indigenous Kids	Finalist	
2014	Elizabeth Macleod and Frieda Wishinsky	A History of Just About Everything: 180 Events, People and Inventions That Changed the World	Finalist	
2014	Ken Setterington	Branded by the Pink Triangle	Finalist	
2014	Eric Walters	My Name Is Blessing	Finalist	
2015	Kira Vermond	Why We Live Where We Live	Winner	
2015	Hugh Brewster	From Vimy to Victory: Canada's Fight to the Finish in World War I	Finalist	
2015	Sarah Elton	Starting from Scratch: What You Should Know about Food and Cooking	Finalist	
2015	Larry Loyie with Wayne K. Spear and Constance Brissenden	Residential Schools, With the Words and Images of Survivors: A National History	Finalist	
2015	David J. Smith	If: A Mind-Bending New Way of Looking at Big Ideas and Numbers	Finalist	
2016	Cory Silverberg	Sex Is a Funny Word: A Book About Bodies, Feelings, and You	Winner	
2016	Paula Ayer	Foodprints: The Story of What We Eat	Finalist	
2016	Maria Birmingham	A Beginner's Guide to Immortality: From Alchemy to Avatars	Finalist	
2016	Jessica Dee Humphreys and Michel Chikwanine	Child Soldier: When Boys and Girls Are Used in War	Finalist	
2016	Edward Keenan	The Art of the Possible: An Everyday Guide to Politics	Finalist	
2017	Elizabeth Macleod	Canada Year by Year	Winner	
2017	Antonia Banyard and Paula Ayer	Water Wow! An Infographic Exploration	Finalist	
2017	Kristina Rutherford	Level the Playing Field: The Past, Present, a Future of Women's Pro Sports	Finalist	
2017	Laura Scandiffio	Fight to Learn: The Struggle to Go to School	Finalist	
2017	Jan Thornhill	The Tragic Tale of the Great Auk	Finalist	
2018	Lisa Charleyboy and Mary Beth Leatherdale	#NotYourPrincess: Voices of Native American Women	Winner	
2018	Jane Drake and Ann Love	Rewilding: Giving Nature a Second Chance	Finalist	
2018	Sarah Elton	Meatless? A Fresh Look at What You Eat	Finalist	
2018	James Gladstone	When Planet Earth Was New	Finalist	
2018	Hetxw'ms Gyetxw (Brett D. Huson)	The Sockeye Mother	Finalist	
2019	James Gladstone and Karen Reczuch	Turtle Pond	Winner	
2019	Erica Fyvie and Bill Slavin	Trash Revolution: Breaking the Waste Cycle	Finalist	
2019	Wab Kinew and Joe Morse	Go Show the World: A Celebration of Indigenous Heroes	Finalist	
2019	Rob Laidlaw	Bat Citizen: Defending the Ninjas of the Night	Finalist	
2019	Merrie-Ellen Wilcox	After Life: Ways We Think About Death	Finalist	
2020	Serah-Marie McMahon and Alison Matthews David	Killer Style: How Fashion Has Injured, Maimed, & Murdered Through History	Winner	
2020	Carolyn Fisher	Cells: An Owner's Handbook	Finalist	
2020	Carey Newman and Kirstie Hudson	Picking Up the Pieces: Residential School Memories and the Making of the Witness Blanket	Finalist	
2020	Rachel Poliquin	Beastly Puzzles: A Brain-Boggling Animal Guessing Game	Finalist	
2020	Ashley Spires	Fairy Science	Finalist	
2021	Karen Pheasant-Neganigwane	Powwow: A Celebration Through Song and Dance	Winner	
2021	Hetxw'ms Gyetxw (Brett D. Huson), illus. by Natasha Donovan	The Eagle Mother	Finalist	
2021	Tanya Lloyd Kyi, illus. by Drew Shannon	This Is Your Brain on Stereotypes: How Science is Tackling Unconscious Bias	Finalist	
2021	Rina Singh, illus. by Marianne Ferrer	111 Trees: How One Village Celebrates the Birth of Every Girl	Finalist	
2021	Kyla Vanderklug	Crows: Genius Birds	Finalist	
2022	Christian Allaire, illus. by Jacqueline Li	The Power of Style: How Fashion and Beauty Are Being Used to Reclaim Cultures	Winner	
2022	Erica Fyvie, illus. by Ian Turner	Mad for Ads: How Advertising Gets (and Stays) in Our Heads	Finalist	
2022	Dr. Lindsay Herriot and Kate Fry (ed.)	Growing Up Trans: In Our Own Words	Finalist	
2022	Kathy Stinson, illus. by François Thisdale	The Girl Who Loved Giraffes and Became the World's First Giraffologist	Finalist	
2022	Robbie Waisman with Susan McClelland	Boy from Buchenwald: The True Story of a Holocaust Survivor	Finalist	
2023	Carey Newman and Kirstie Hudson	The Witness Blanket: Truth, Art and Reconciliation	Winner	
2023	Tanya Lloyd Kyi and Julia Kyi, illus. by Vivian Rosas	Better Connected: How Girls Are Using Social Media for Good	Finalist	
2023	Elise Gravel with Mykaell Blais, illus. by Elise Gravel	Pink, Blue, and You! Questions for Kids About Gender Stereotypes	Finalist	
2023	Laura Alary, illus. by Andrea Blinick	Sun in my Tummy	Finalist	
2023	Gregor Craigie, illus. by Kathleen Fu	Why Humans Build Up: The Rise of Towers, Temples and Skyscrapers	Finalist	
