= Dropping knowledge =

Organization

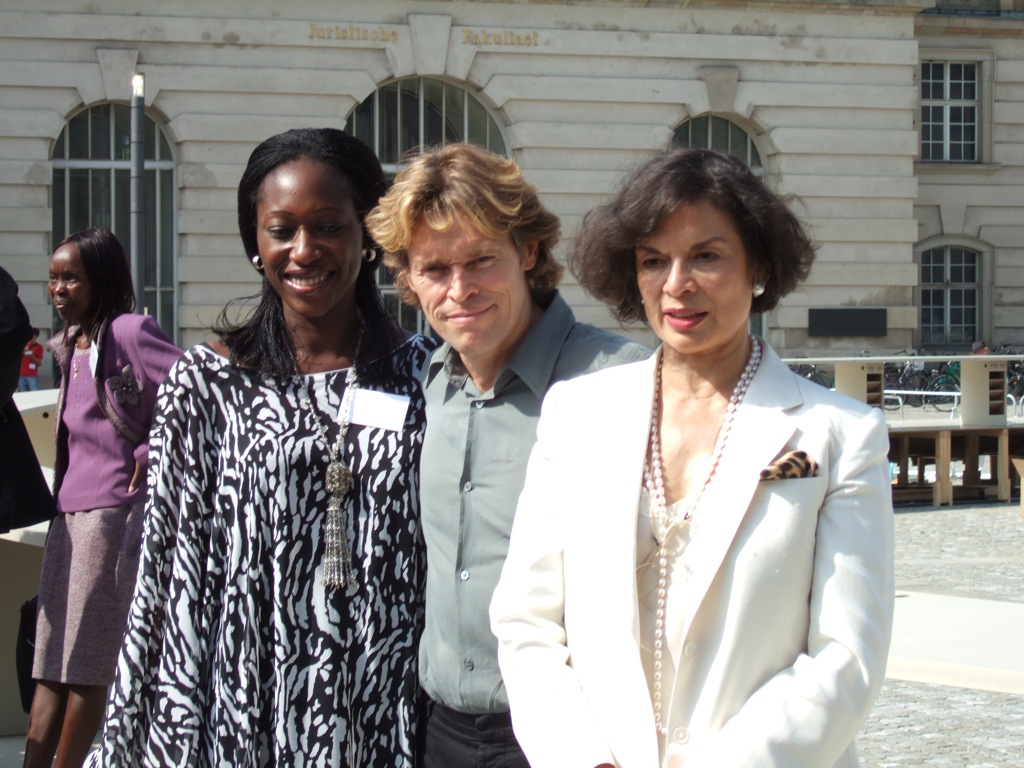
Moderators Hafsat Abiola and Willem Dafoe, with Bianca Jagger at the Table of Free Voices

Dropping Knowledge (styled "dropping knowledge") is a non-profit organization in the United States and Germany. In the US, Dropping Knowledge International is a project of the Tides Center, a non-profit fiscal sponsor and registered 501(c)3. In Germany, Dropping Knowledge e.V. is an Eingetragener Verein. Both organizations aim to foster discussion of the world's social and environmental problems. Founded in the US in 2003, the organization hosted a large discussion in Berlin on September 9, 2006.

The organization was founded by German filmmaker Ralf Schmerberg, American filmmaker Cindy Gantz, and American activist Jackie Wallace, originally as a response to the Iraq War, but from its inception aimed to be more than a mere "anti-movement": dropping knowledge became an interactive platform for questions, concerns and initiatives from around the world, as well as a meeting place for concerned world citizens striving to turn apathy into action.

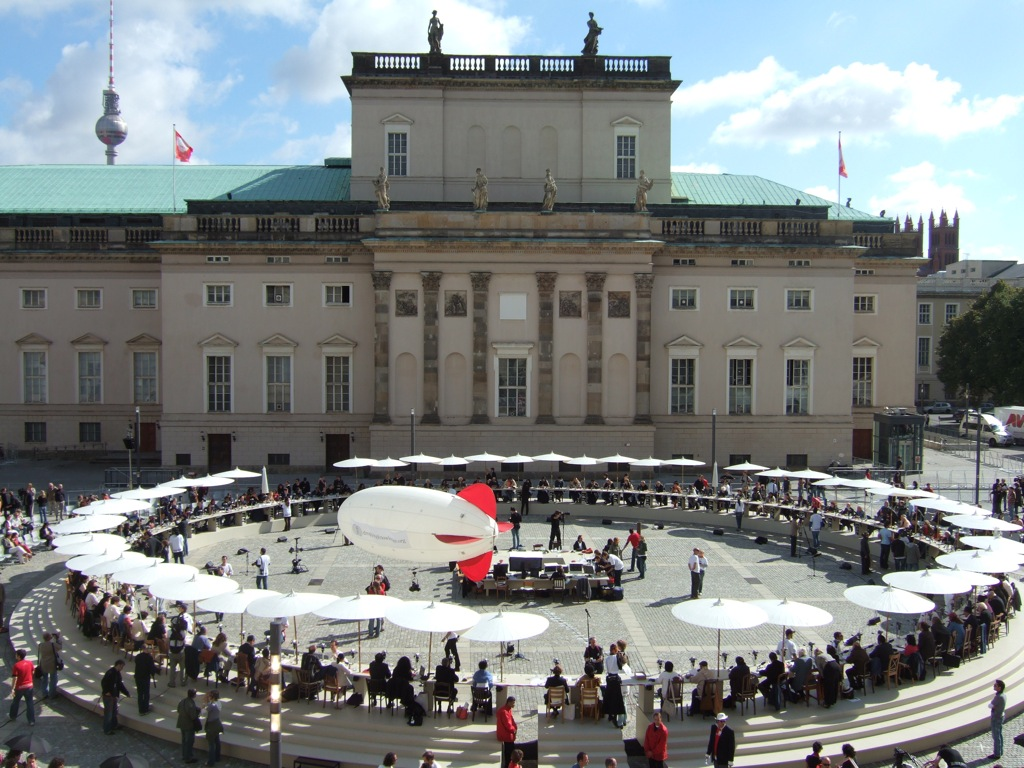
The Table of Free Voices, diameter 38m, in front of the Berlin State Opera on the Bebelplatz, Berlin. 9 September 2006.

The nine-hour discussion, named The Table of Free Voices and overseen by German Foreign Minister Frank-Walter Steinmeier, used a large round table on the Bebelplatz in Berlin. 112 international artists, philosophers, scientists and human rights activists were invited to simultaneously answer 100 selected questions, recorded by 112 cameras and microphones. The questions had been collected on the organization's website beginning in September 2005. The questions were read out loud by moderators Hafsat Abiola and Willem Dafoe. Prominent participants included Cornel West, Bianca Jagger, Hans-Peter Dürr, John Gage, Bill Joy, Harry Wu and Wim Wenders.

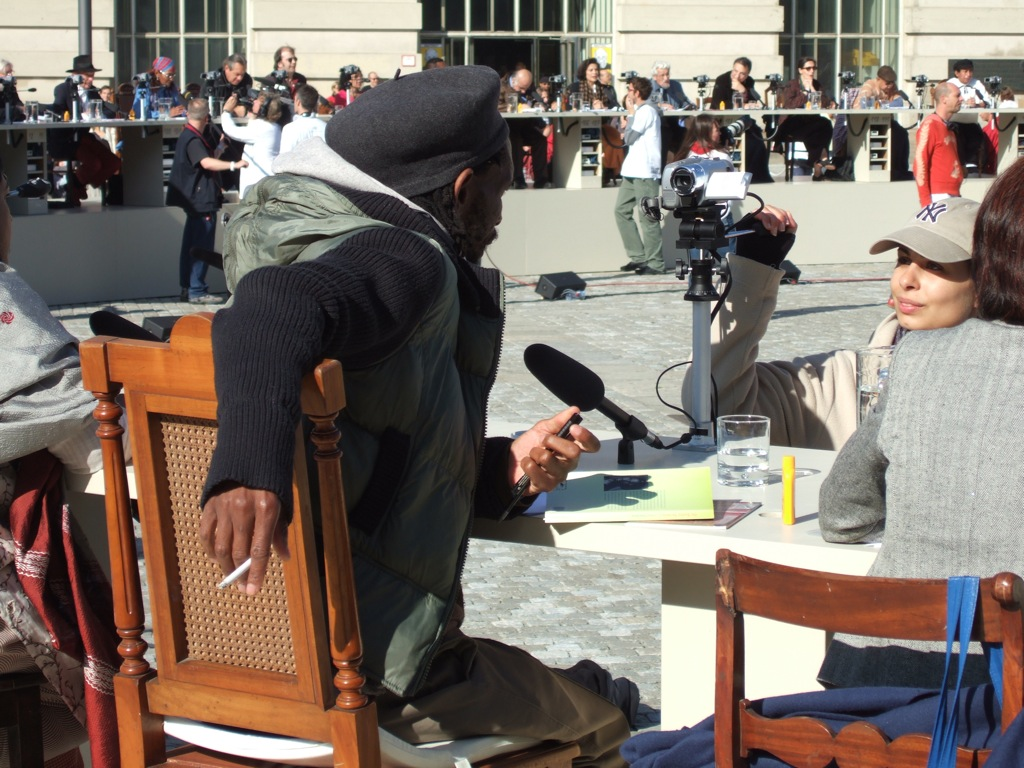
Participant at the Table of Free Voices, answering a question into his camera and microphone

Transcripts and videos were later released on the project's website under a copyleft license, organized in a "Living Library" developed by the Deutsche Forschungszentrum für Künstliche Intelligenz in Saarbrücken (German Research Institute for Artificial Intelligence).

The cost of the event was 5 million Euros; initial funding came from the Wallace Foundation and The Mark and Sharon Bloome Fund, the Allianz insurance company contributed 2.7 million Euro in 2005, and Volkswagen also made a sizable donation.

dropping knowledge has also produced and is distributing several short films, all under the "dropping knowledge Copyleft License" which places some restrictions on commercial use: it forbids to use the content for commercial advertising.

== Participants ==
- Yassin Adnan
- Martin Almada
- Udi Aloni
- Ekaterina Moshaeva
- Homero Aridjis
- Mohammed Arkoun
- Anthony Arnove
- Jwan M. Aziz
- Rodrigo Baggio
- Dedi Baron
- Mark Benecke
- Ana Lucy Bengochea
- Sihem Bensedrine
- Roland Berger
- Abbas Beydoun
- Andries Botha
- Kamal Boullata
- Tania Brugera
- Donato Bayu Bay Bumacas
- Gladman Chibememe
- Robbie Conal
- Bora Cosic
- Catherine David
- Hans-Peter Dürr
- Steve Earle
- Rachid ElDaif
- Sabiha El-Zayat-Erbakan
- Jodie Evans
- Benjamin Fahrer
- Raymond Federman
- Giora Feidman
- Viviana Figueroa
- John Gage
- Ashok Gangadean
- Susan George
- Eddie Glaude
- Jonathan Granoff
- Jesper Green
- Nadja Halilbegovich
- Govindaswamy Hariramamurthi
- Mae-Wan Ho
- Lillian Holt
- Kigge Hvid
- Pico Iyer
- Bianca Jagger
- Bill Joy
- Dritëro Kasapi
- China Keitetsi
- Audrey Kitagawa
- Takashi Kiuchi
- Paul Knight
- Anuradha Koirala
- Song Kosal
- Michael Laitman
- Ervin Laszlo
- Yungchen Lhamo
- Fang Lijun
- Tegla Loroupe
- Geert Lovink
- Sohrab Mahdavi
- Livingstone Maluleke
- Jerry Mander
- Neela Marikkar
- Fred Matser
- Jonathan Meese
- Mayank R. Mehta
- Valentina Melnikova
- Paul D. (aka DJ Spooky) Miller
- Anuradha Mittal
- Esther Mwaura-Muiru
- Helena Norberg-Hodge
- Oscar Olivera
- Vesna Pešić
- Mohau Pheko
- Leung Ping-kwan
- Sydney Possuelo
- Eliane Potiguara
- Swami Pragyapad
- José Manuel Prieto
- Avi Primor
- Wolfram Putz
- Monira Rahman
- Lesego Rampolokeng
- Alvaro Restrepo
- Simon Retallack
- Stephanie Robinson
- Santiago Roncagliolo
- Masuma Bibi Russel
- Elisabet Sahtouris
- Masami Saionji
- Kailash Satyarthi
- Beverly Schwartz
- Norbert Servos
- Mahsa Shekarloo
- Sulak Sivaraksa
- Tavis Smiley
- Fernando Solanas
- Thenmozhi Soundararajan
- Timothy Speed
- Tamas St. Auby
- Jonathan Stack
- Pauline Tangiora
- Michael E. Tigar
- Oliviero Toscani
- Michael P. Totten
- Galsan Tschinag
- Benson Venegas
- Constantin von Barloewen
- Sima Wali
- Kurt Weidemann
- Tu Weiming
- Eliot Weinberger
- Brian J. Weller
- Wim Wenders
- Cornel West
- Harry Wu
- Shaobin Yang
- Irina Yasina
- Sanar Yurdatapan

== Problema: The Film ==
Ralf Schmerberg released a documentary film about the Table of Voices called Problema, which is available to watch or download for free online. The film was directed and edited by Schmerberg and features not only selections from the 112 responses to the 100 questions, but also visual footage from various historical, news, documentary and artistic sources. Some of the visual footage included scenes from the films of Sergei Eisenstein, Godfrey Reggio, Abel Gance, Alain Resnais, Mohsen Makhmalbaf, Guy Debord, and Fritz Lang.
