= Sean Cassidy (disambiguation) =

Sean Cassidy is an illustrator and artist.

Sean or Shaun Cassidy may also refer to:

- Shaun Cassidy, singer and actor
  - Shaun Cassidy (album), his 1976 debut album
- Sean Cassidy (Fair City character)
- Banshee (character), the Marvel Comics superhero
