= Dušan Petričić =

Serbian illustrator and caricaturist

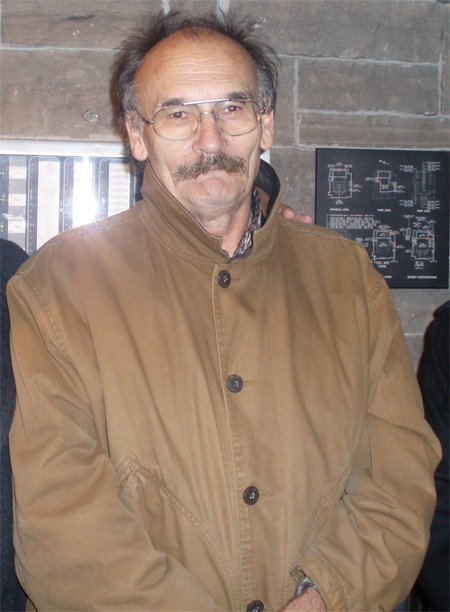
- Petričić in 2010
- Born: 10 May 1946 (age 79); Belgrade, FPR Yugoslavia
- Education: Academy of Applied Arts, Belgrade
- Known for: Illustration, cartoons, animation
- Notable work: Children's books illustrations
- Awards: Levstik Award; 1987 for Guliver med pritlikavci Silbert Honour; 2001 for The Longitude Prize

Dušan Petričić (Serbian Cyrillic: Душан Петричић; born 10 May 1946) is a Serbian illustrator and caricaturist. He has illustrated numerous children's books and his caricatures have appeared in various newspapers and magazines from Politika to The New York Times, The Wall Street Journal and the Toronto Star.

Petričić has received numerous awards for his work including an IBBY Certificate of Honour, an Alberta Book Award for his illustrations in Tim Wynne-Jones' On Tumbledown Hill and many others. In 1989 he won the Levstik Award in Slovenia for his illustrations of Guliver med pritlikavci (Gulliver in Lilliput). In 2001 the book The Longitude Prize for which he produced the illustrations won an honour at the Robert F. Sibert Informational Book Awards.

From 1993 to 2013, he lived and worked in Toronto, Ontario, Canada.

== Selected works illustrated ==
- The Dance of the Violin, written by Kathy Stinson, 2017
- Zoomberry, written by Dennis Lee, 2016
- Snap!, written by Hazel Hutchins, 2015
- The Man with the Violin, written by Kathy Stinson, 2013
- In the Tree House, written by Andrew Larsen, 2013
- Mr. Zinger's Hat, Cary Fagan, 2012
- My Toronto, Petričić, 2011
- When Apples Grew Noses And White Horses Flew, Jan Andrews, 2011
- Better Together, Simon Shapiro, 2011
- Jacob Two-Two on the High Seas, Cary Fagan, 2009
- Jacob Two-Two Meets the Hooded Fang, Mordecai Richler, 2009
- Jacob Two-Two's First Spy Case, Mordecai Richler, 2009
- Jacob Two-Two and the Dinosaur, Mordecai Richler, 2009
- Mattland, Hazel Hutchins and Gail Herbert, 2008
- The Queen's Feet, Sarah Ellis, 2008
- On Tumbledown Hill, Tim Wynne-Jones, 2008
- The Longitude Prize, Joan Dash, 2008
- My New Shirt, Cary Fagan, 2007
- Lickety-Split, Robert Heidbreder, 2007
- Alphabad: Mischievous ABCs, Shannon Stewart, 2007
- Bashful Bob and Doleful Dorinda, Margaret Atwood, 2006
- Bagels from Benny, Aubrey Davis, 2005
- Rude Ramsay and the Roaring Radishes, Margaret Atwood, 2004
- Ned Mouse breaks away, Tim Wynne-Jones, 2003
- Wings and Rockets: The Story of Women in Air and Space, Jeannine Atkins, 2003
- Grandmother Doll, Alice Bartels, 2001
- Earthlings Inside and Out: A Space Alien Studies the Human Body, Valerie Wyatt, 1999
- The Enormous Potato, Aubrey Davis, 1997
- La Grosse Patate, Aubrey Davis and Michel Bourque, 1997
- Bone Button Borscht, Aubrey Davis, 1996
- Let's Play: Traditional Games of Childhood, Camilla Gryski, 1996
- Scary Science: The Truth Behind Vampires, Witches, UFO's Ghosts and More, Sylvia Funston, 1996
- The Color of Things, Vivienne Shalom, 1995
- Guliver med pritlikavci (Gulliver in Lilliput), from the 1726 classic by Jonathan Swift, 1987
