= Sima Wali =

Afghan human rights advocate

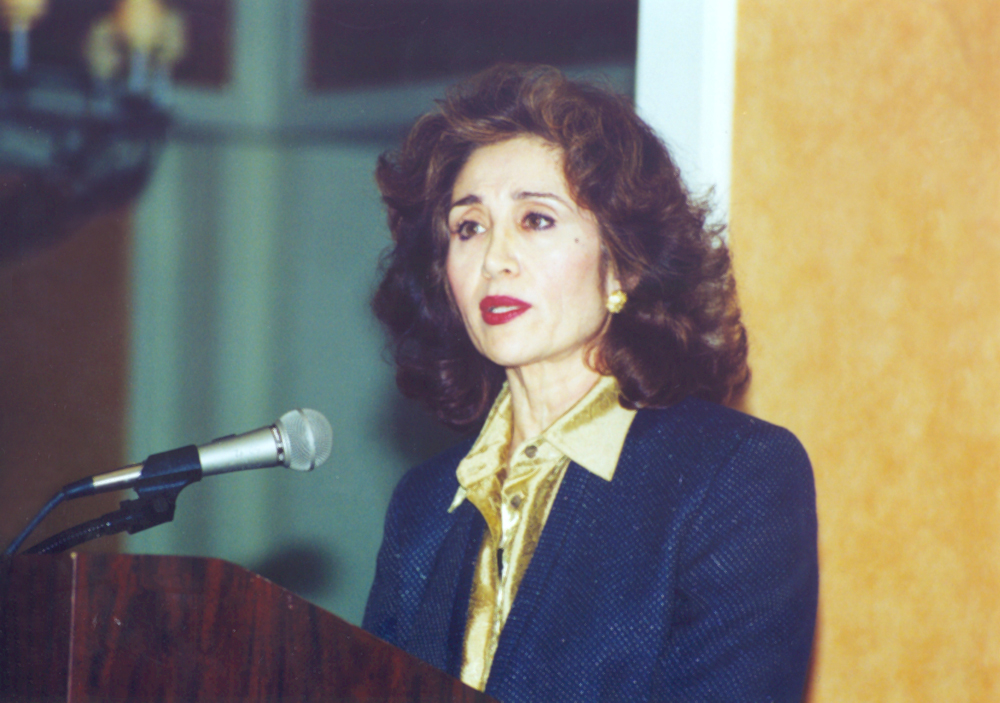
- Wali in 1999
- Born: 7 April 1951; Kandahar, Afghanistan
- Died: 22 September 2017 (aged 66); Falls Church, Virginia, United States
- Organizations: Refugee Women in Development, Inc.
- Awards: Amnesty International's Ginetta Sagan Fund Award, Ms. Foundation's Gloria Steinem Women of Vision Award

Sima Wali (Dari: سیما ولی; April 7, 1951 – September 22, 2017) was one of the foremost Afghan human rights advocates in the world, serving as an international campaigner for the liberties and empowerment of refugee and internally displaced populations. She was the Chief Executive Officer of Refugee Women in Development (RefWID), Inc., a global non-profit organization that advocated for the civil rights of refugee women and girls fleeing from conflict and for their equitable reintegration into their societies. She was also the vice president of the Sisterhood Is Global Institute, the world’s first feminist think tank.

Wali said that her personal experience as a refugee of the Soviet-Afghan War inspired her fight for the human rights of uprooted populations. Her testimonies throughout her career before the United Nations, the United States Congress and the U.S. State Department led to the appropriation of millions of dollars supporting Afghan women-led NGOs and the participation of women in Afghanistan's nascent democracy.

She delivered the keynote address at the United Nations' celebration of International Women's Day in 2002, speaking alongside U.N. Secretary General Kofi Annan, First Lady Laura Bush, and Queen Noor of Jordan.

"For more than twenty years, I have waged my own jihad for social justice and peace, as the rights of my Afghan sisters have been systematically violated to the extent of rendering us as non-citizens in our own country. Afghan women have suffered heinous crimes against humanity, and need diplomatic and financial leverage from the international community to aid them in their fight to reclaim their rightful place in Afghan and international society." -Sima Wali at the United Nations, 2002

She was also a speaker at the Ford Hall Forum in 1999 and 2009, and was a participant in the Dropping Knowledge project, among many other prestigious events and notable institutions.

== Career ==
In 2001, Sima Wali was one of only three female delegates at the U.N.-organized Bonn Agreement in Germany, which formed a new Afghan government, following the fall of the Taliban. She served as a representative of King Mohammed Zahir Shah's Rome delegation.

At the conference, Wali was pivotal in the creation of the Ministry of Women's Affairs, insisting that her male counterparts permanently include the ministry in the new administration. She was then nominated to lead that ministry, but declined in order to focus on her international activism. Wali went on to nominate Sima Samar to the position of Minister of Women's Affairs and also selected other women to serve in the interim government and ensured that gender-sensitive language was incorporated into the peace agreement.

Sima Wali appears on the front page of The Guardian newspaper on December 6, 2001.

"Women must be actively involved in negotiating peace. As non-combatants, they are best equipped in building and sustaining a culture of peace. We will no longer stand to settle for decisions that are not gender-sensitive as we form the future of our war-ravaged nation." -Sima Wali in Bonn, Germany, 2001

That same year, Wali served as the chief organizer of the Afghan Women's Summit for Democracy in Brussels, Belgium, an unparalleled gathering of its kind. The summit was convened with the help of Equality Now, UNIFEM, the Gender Advisor to the U.N. Secretary-General, along with a coalition of women's organizations. According to Equality Now, the Afghan Women’s Summit "adopted an historic expression of the long held dreams and aspirations of Afghan women, together with a list of concrete demands for immediate implementation relating to the reconstruction of Afghanistan."

In June 2003, Wali was accompanied by Women's Edge co-founder and executive director Ritu Sharma on a human rights advocacy mission to Afghanistan. It was one of several trips Wali undertook to her homeland and to Afghan refugee camps in Pakistan, where she led dozens of training and empowerment seminars. Wali often spoke out against "the constant marginalization" of females in refugee and post-war societies, calling for training that helps those women to become leaders.

According to the NGO Dropping Knowledge, "Wali has pioneered in developing program models aimed at empowering women affected by conflict, rebuilding post-conflict democratic civil society institutions, and advocating for human rights protection of women and their male counterparts." In the 1990s, Wali played a strong role in supporting the development of NGOs in Bosnia and Croatia during the war in what was then Yugoslavia.

She also played a key role in creating the Policy Council on Afghan Women, a coalition of non-governmental organizations that works to advance women's status in Afghanistan and to ensure that women there are equal recipients of U.S. development assistance funds.

While she was in Jalalabad, Afghanistan, in 2005 to launch a project on building democracy among women, Wali narrowly escaped death at the hands of Taliban, Al-Qaeda, and Pakistani militants. Although she had received a death threat from the Taliban before, this was the closest she had come to being killed by forces opposed to her work.

Since their ascent in the mid-1990s, Wali had been a vocal opponent of the Taliban's ideology. At the State of the World Forum in 1998, she said:

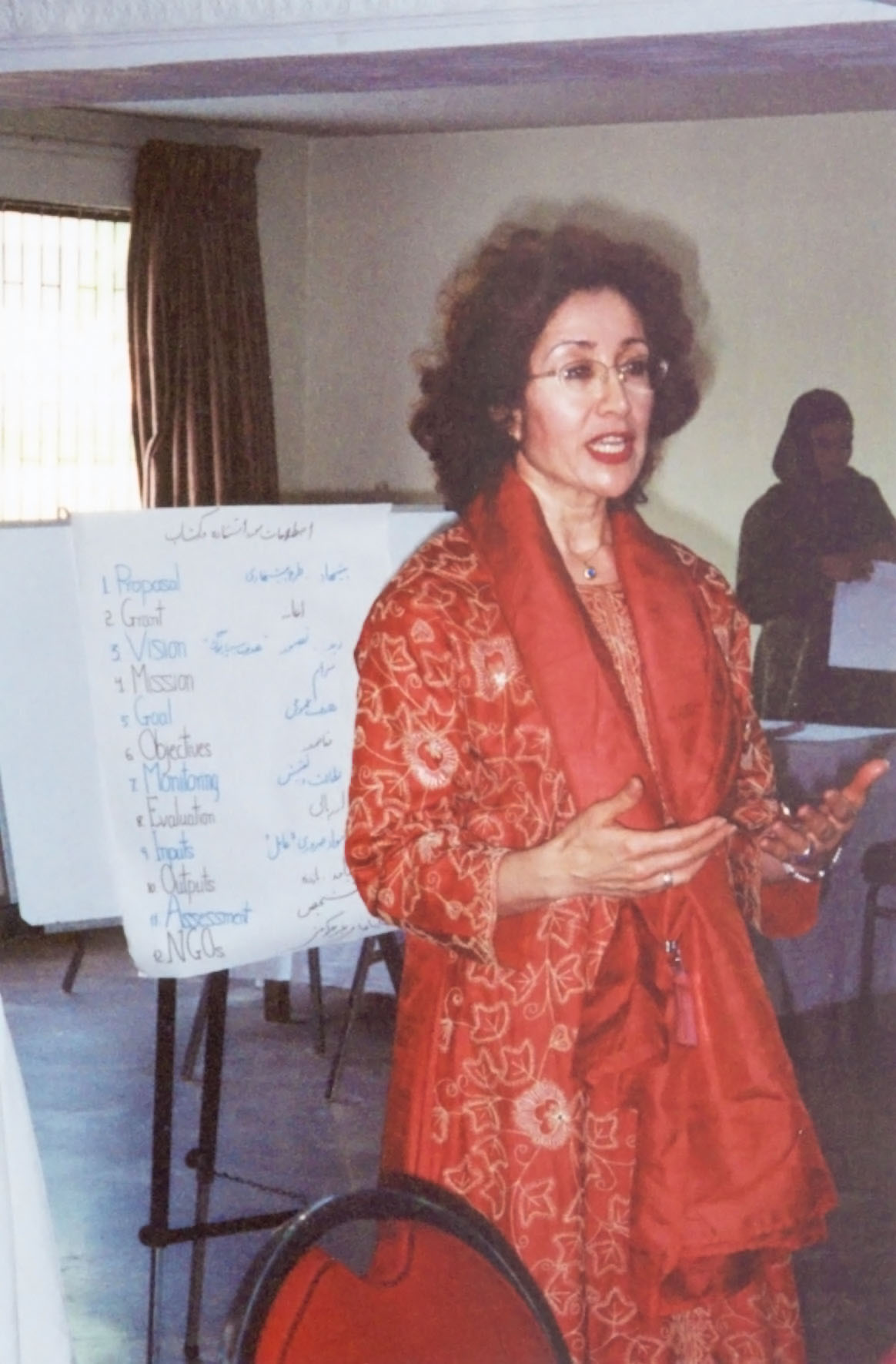
Sima Wali leads a training seminar for Afghan refugees at a camp in Peshawar, Pakistan, in 1998.

"The Taliban is using culture and religion to keep women down, but there is nothing in my religion that teaches keeping women at home, not educating them, starving them, and withholding medical treatment from them, so they die. Islam teaches us to care for and protect women, so arguing the treatment of women in Afghanistan is okay because it's our culture and religion is an argument in a vacuum."

She had also been a bold critic of what she felt was the American government's abandonment of Afghanistan between the 12 years that the Soviet-Afghan War ended and the U.S.-led invasion of Afghanistan began.

"The United States helped create and support the 'Holy Warriors,' the most fanatic group that got the lion's share of the weapons from the U.S. It's played a major role in the Afghanistan situation by basically financing the war, and it now has a responsibility to help finance peace. The women and their children have borne the brunt, but the U.S. must now use its leverage to find peace and bring about a resolution." -Sima Wali in San Francisco, California, 1998

Wali's writings have been published in prominent journals, newspapers and books. In Women in Exile, she relates some of the harrowing details of her escape from Afghanistan in 1978.

Wali co-authored Invisible History: Afghanistan's Untold Story (2009) with Paul Fitzgerald and Elizabeth Gould. Fitgerald and Gould, along with RefWID, also produced the documentary film The Woman in Exile Returns: The Sima Wali Story. It tells the story of Wali's return to Kabul in October 2002 after 24 years in exile and her work to help in the rebuilding efforts.

Wali has made speeches, led conferences and sat on panels at many universities and institutions, which include the United Nations, the United States Congress, the U.S. State Department, Amnesty International, Ford Hall Forum, Yale University Law School, George Washington University Law School, Northeastern University, Woodrow Wilson Center, the Carnegie Council for Ethics in International Affairs, and the Dropping Knowledge project.

She has been interviewed and featured on various news programs on CNN, CBS News, ABC News, FOX News, Al Jazeera, NPR, and CBC.

Prior to her exile to the United States in 1978, Wali worked for the American Embassy in Kabul and the U.S. Peace Corps.

Wali died on September 22, 2017, in Falls Church, Virginia, from multiple system atrophy at the age of 66.

== Education ==
Sima Wali was conferred honorary doctorate degrees by both Smith College and Shenandoah University in 2002 and 2003, respectively. She earned her master's degree in International Relations from American University's School of International Service (SIS); and her bachelor's degree in Business Administration from Kabul University.

== Awards ==
- Amnesty International, Ginetta Sagan Fund Award (1999)
- Women's Commission for Refugee Women and Children, Women of Vision Award (1992)
- Women Donors Network, Resourceful Women Award (1992)
- Ms. Foundation for Women, Gloria Steinem Women of Vision Award (1989)
- National Conference for College Women Student Leaders, Women of Distinction Award (1988)
- Clairol Foundation, Take Charge Award (1987)

== Consultancies ==
- Senior Technical Specialist, PADCO/AECOM, Alternative Livelihoods Project, Badakhshan, Afghanistan (2005-2006)
- Advisor, U.S. Agency for International Development (USAID), NGO/PVO leadership (2003)
- Advisor, Women for Women International (1997-2003)
- Advisor, U.S. Department of Health and Human Services, Office of Refugee Resettlement, Refugee Women's Task Force on programs and policies pertaining to domestic refugee women's programs (2002)
- Advisor, United Nations High Commissioner for Refugees on development programs and policies for refugee and displaced women (2001)
- Advisor, United Nations Division on the Advancement of Women in developing gender-sensitive programs and policies for uprooted women and for women and girls experiencing major civil and political transitions (2000)
- Board of Directors and Advisor, Harvard University's Refugee Trauma Center on development projects, policies and practices impacting women in societies undergoing socio-political transformations (1987-1989, 2000)
- Advisor, United Nations Special Envoy on Afghanistan and the Government of Norway on special consultation on Afghanistan (1999)
- Board of Directors, Fund for the Future of Our Children (1995-1999)
- Advisor, Developed Creative Associates International, Inc., programs on gender, human rights, and forced migration (1998)
- Board of Directors, Women's Commission for Refugee Women and Children (1990-1994)
