= Pirate's Passage =

2015 Canadian animated adventure film

- Based on: Pirate's Passage by William Gilkerson
- Written by: Brad Peyton; Donald Sutherland
- Directed by: Mike Barth; Jamie Gallant
- Starring: Donald Sutherland; Gage Munroe; Carrie-Anne Moss
- Music by: Andrew Lockington
- Country of origin: Canada
- Original language: English

Production
- Producers: Brad Peyton; Donald Sutherland
- Editors: Jef Harris; Paul Neumann
- Running time: 88 minutes
- Production companies: Martin's River Ink; PiP Animation Services

Original release
- Network: CBC Television
- Release: 4 January 2015

Pirate's Passage is a 2015 Canadian animated adventure film based on the 2006 children's book of the same name by William Gilkerson. It premiered on CBC Television on 4 January 2015.

== Plot ==
The story is set in 1952 in the fictional community of Grey Rocks, Nova Scotia, where 12-year-old Jim faces bullying at school. His widowed mother runs a local inn, which is facing a takeover by a wealthy family. Sea captain Charles Johnson appears to assist Jim and his mother through their struggles. However, Johnson appears to be a pirate who supposedly died two centuries ago.

The story is based on William Gilkerson's book Pirate's Passage, which won the 2006 Governor General's Award for English-language children's literature.

== Voice Cast ==
- Donald Sutherland as Captain Charles Johnson
- Gage Munroe as Jim Hawkins
- Carrie-Anne Moss as Kerstin Hawkins
- Megan Follows as Meg O’Leary
- Kim Coates as Roy Moehner
- Colm Feore as Corporal Robin Hawkins
- Gordon Pinsent as Harry Freelove, The Barber
- Paul Gross as John Rackham
- Rossif Sutherland as Klaus Moehner
- Terry Haig as Mr. Herkes

== Production ==
Pirate's Passage was produced and written by Sutherland and Brad Peyton through Sutherland's production company Martin's River Ink and the studios of PiP Animation Services.

Tandem Communications distributes the film outside of Canada.
