= Vera Manuel =

- Kulilu Paⱡki (Butterfly Woman)
- Born: March 20, 1948
- Died: January 22, 2010 (aged 61); Vancouver, British Columbia, Canada
- Citizenship: Canadian
- Occupations: Playwright, poet, writer, healer, educator

Vera Manuel (March 20, 1948 – January 22, 2010, Secwepemc-Ktunaxa), was a playwright, poet, writer, healer and educator in British Columbia, Canada. Her native name was Kulilu Paⱡki (Butterfly Woman). Her plays were produced both in Canada and the United States.

== Biography ==
She was the first daughter of cultural leader Marceline Paul (Ktunaxa) and George Manuel, Sr (Secwepemc). Both her parents were survivors of the Canadian Indian residential school system. Manuel grew up on the Neskonlith reserve in the interior of British Columbia. She lived for many years as an adult in coastal Vancouver, Canada. She died there in January 2010, aged 61.

Manuel worked in diverse communities across North America. She wrote and produced numerous plays exploring cultural oppression and genocide in First Nations communities. She worked both independently and through Storytellers Theatre of Cookeville, Tennessee, writing and producing The Strength of Indian Women and Every Warrior's Song. Her poetry and short stories were published in journals and anthologies, and—like her plays—performed in spoken word events at a variety of venues across Canada and the United States.

Her play, Strength of Indian Women was staged throughout North America. It was published in the book, Two Plays about Residential Schools (1998), along with one by Larry Loyie (Cree). Described by one critic as "beautiful in dramatic terms alone", Manuel's play has been staged as part of decolonization healing events across Canada.

== Legacy and honours ==
Her work was honoured by inclusion at the Native American Women Playwrights Program, housed at Miaml University, in Oxford, Ohio.

== Works ==
Plays

- Song of the Circle, 1989
- Honouring the Strength of Indian Women, 1992
