= Dave Whamond =

Canadian cartoonist

- Born: Edmonton, Alberta, Canada
- Occupation: Cartoonist
- Notable work: Reality Check

Dave Whamond is a Canadian cartoonist and children's book author/illustrator who draws the newspaper comic strip Reality Check, which has been published daily since 1995. As of 2010, Reality Check was being distributed by United Feature Syndicate. Since December 2022, Day by Dave has been running on GoComics. Whamond has been nominated for the National Cartoonist Society's Silver Reuben Award ten times, and has won the award four of those times. His other awards include the Blue Spruce Award and the Silver Birch Award, both from the Ontario Library Association.

Whamond was born in Edmonton, Alberta, and grew up in the small Alberta town of Whitecourt. After attending the Alberta College of Art, he went on to work for the Calgary Herald for five years before starting Reality Check.
