= Val Ross =

Canadian writer (1950–2008)

Valerie Jacqueline Candida "Val" Ross (17 October 1950 – 17 February 2008) was a Canadian writer who won the 2004 Norma Fleck Award for Canadian children's non-fiction. She was also a journalist for the newspaper The Globe and Mail, and won a National Newspaper Award in 1992 for critical writing.

== Biography ==
Val Ross was born in Toronto, on 17 October 1950, to Jack and Erma Ross, and had one younger brother, Philip ("Pip"). Val attended the Institute of Child Study, a progressive primary school operated by the University of Toronto. After completing high school at Jarvis Collegiate Institute, she considered becoming a visual artist and studied at St Martin's School of Art in London, England. Eventually she graduated with a bachelor's degree from the University of Toronto.

Before establishing her career as a freelance writer, she worked in urban planning, tourism writing and as a broadcaster at CBC. She traveled extensively, developing her interests in community, culture and media.

In the early 1970s, she began studying Washin Ryu, a form of karate taught by Sensei Burt Konzak, attaining a brown belt. Val was also highly involved with several groups of women in the Toronto area that met frequently for recreational walks (The "Walking Women").

She wrote for Chatelaine, Saturday Night, and Toronto Life, and then was hired as a staff writer and editor at Maclean's, where she worked in the late 1970s and early 1980s. She reported on the conflict in El Salvador, and became an important voice for human rights and freedom of expression. She spent the remainder of her career at The Globe and Mail, as a publishing reporter, as deputy editor of the Comment section, and as an arts reporter.

She wrote two children's books, 2003's The Road to There and 2006's You Can't Read This. The former, a history of cartography, won the $10,000 Norma Fleck Award in 2004. You Can't Read This is a history of banned literature.

Her final book, the posthumous Robertson Davies: A Portrait in Mosaic, is an oral history of Canadian writer Robertson Davies. She continued to work on the book even after being diagnosed with brain cancer on the day after her 57th birthday in 2007.

She died in Toronto on 17 February 2008, aged 57, of brain cancer.

== Selected works ==
- 2003: The Road to There (Norma Fleck Award winner) (Gelett Burgess Children's Book Award Honors)
- 2006: You Can't Read This
- 2008: Robertson Davies: A Portrait in Mosaic (posthumous)
