= Anoosha Syed =

Pakistani-Canadian illustrator

- Born: Pakistan
- Occupation: illustrator
- Notable work: That's Not My Name!

Anoosha Syed is a Pakistani-Canadian illustrator and writer. She has illustrated 40 books in her career, including Karamo Brown's picture book, I Am Perfectly Designed. She also illustrated a Google Doodle on the birthday of Waheed Murad.

== Early life and education ==
Syed moved frequently during her childhood due to her father's work. She lived at times in Saudi Arabia and Dubai and attended high school in Pakistan.

Syed attended college in Switzerland, where she earned a bachelor's degree in illustration at Ceruleum Ecole d'arts Visuels.

== Career ==
Syed worked in the animation industry for about a decade. Her illustrations gained some viral attention in 2016, when she illustrated modern day versions of the Disney Princesses, and in 2017, when her Harry Potter fanart of a Black Hermione drew both negative and positive reactions.

In 2019, Syed illustrated Karamo Brown's picture book I Am Perfectly Designed, which he co-wrote with his son. In October of that year, Syed illustrated a Google Doodle in honor of Pakistani actor Waheed Murad's 81st birthday.

In 2022, Syed released her first book as an author, That's Not My Name!. The book, which follows a young girl named Mirha teaching her classmates how to pronounce her name, drew inspiration from Syed's own experiences with having her name mispronounced in school. In 2023, the book was nominated for the Blue Spruce Award. Her second book as an author, Lost Stick, was released in March 2024. It is a finalist for the 2025 Blue Spruce Award.

Syed has cited artists Brigette Barrager, Mary Blair, Stevie Lewis, the Provensens, and Miroslav Sasek as inspirations.

== Awards and recognition ==
- Forest of Reading Awards (2025)
- Blue Spruce Award (2025)

== Personal life ==
As of 2022, Syed lived in Toronto with her husband and her cat. She is Muslim. As of 2025, Syed was based out of Dallas, Texas.

== Publications ==
=== As author and illustrator ===
- Syed, Anoosha (2022-07-12). That's Not My Name!. Penguin. ISBN 978-0-593-40517-8.
- Syed, Anoosha (2024-03-26). Lost Stick. Penguin. ISBN 9780593405192
- Syed, Anoosha (2025-04-1). The Salt Princess. HarperCollins. ISBN 9780063324718

=== As illustrator ===
- Harper, Benjamin; Stephens, Sarah Hines (2017-05-02). Bug Girl. Imprint. ISBN 978-1-250-10661-2.
- Stabler, David (2018-10-09). Kid Scientists: True Tales of Childhood from Science Superstars. Quirk Books. ISBN 978-1-68369-075-7.
- Brown, Karamo; Brown, Jason "Rachel" (2019-11-05). I Am Perfectly Designed. Henry Holt and Company (BYR). ISBN 978-1-250-76222-1.
- Harris, Robie H. (2019-08-27). Look!: Babies Head to Toe. Abrams. ISBN 978-1-68335-355-3.
- Saeed, Aisha (2019-06-04). Bilal Cooks Daal. Simon and Schuster. ISBN 978-1-5344-1810-3.
- Soderberg, Erin (2019-06-04). Daring Dreamers Club #2: Piper Cooks Up a Plan (Disney: Daring Dreamers Club). Random House Children's Books. ISBN 978-0-7364-3944-2.
- Abu-Jaber, Diana (2020-03-17) Silverworld. Crown Books. ISBN 978-0553509687.
- Barnaby, Hannah (2020-07-28). Monster and Boy. Henry Holt and Company (BYR). ISBN 978-1-250-21784-4.
- Ahuja, Nandini (2021). Rise Up and Write It: With Real Mail, Posters, and More!. HarperCollins Publishers. ISBN 978-0-06-302959-0.
- Barnaby, Hannah (2021-03-02). Monster and Boy: Monster's First Day of School. Henry Holt and Company (BYR). ISBN 978-1-250-21786-8.
- Barnaby, Hannah (2022-01-11). Monster and Boy: The Sister Surprise. Henry Holt and Company (BYR). ISBN 978-1-250-21788-2.
- Preziosi, Alessandra (2023-04-04) Swaddled with Love. Clarion Books. ISBN 978-0358620334.
- Faruqi, Saadia (2023-5-30) Rani's Remarkable Day. Clarion Books. ISBN 978-0358536772.
- Rao-Robinson, Anitha (2024-10-22) Sari Sisters. Penguin Random House. ISBN 9780593526354.
- Abbas, Marzieh (2024-12-31) Excited for Eid. Little Bee Books. ISBN 978-1499816259.
