= Larry Loyie =

Cree author from Canada

- Oskiniko
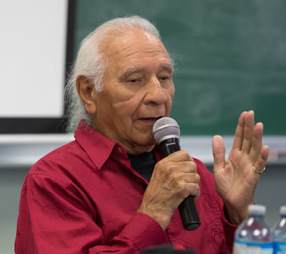
- Loyie at a book launch at the Shingwauk Gathering in 2015
- Born: 1933; Slave Lake, Alberta
- Died: April 18, 2016 (aged 82–83); Edmonton, Alberta
- Occupation: Author
- Partner: Constance Brissenden
- Writing career
- Language: English
- Website: firstnationswriter.com

Larry Loyie (Oskiniko) (November 4, 1933 – April 18, 2016) was an award-winning Canadian author and playwright. He was known for several children's books about his residential school experience as a child and for his plays. His books were written with his partner Constance Brissenden. In 1993 the couple founded the Living Traditions Writers Group, to encourage Indigenous writers in Vancouver, British Columbia.

== Early life and education ==
Loyie was born into a Cree family in Slave Lake, Alberta, Canada. His maternal grandfather Edward Twin of Kinuso was a tribal elder who gave Loyie his Cree name of Oskiniko, meaning “Young Man.”

At age nine, when his father was serving in World War II, Loyie was sent to the St. Bernand Indian Residential School in Grouard, Alberta. Separated from his family for long periods, he attended St. Bernand's through age 14.

== Work and career ==
After leaving school, Loyie started working. He first worked in the fishery industry and logging. Later he studied to become certified as a counsellor. He served in the Canadian Forces as a paratrooper.

By 1992, he had moved from the interior to Vancouver, British Columbia. There he met his future partner Constance Brissenden, a writer and editor, at a free creative writing class in the city's Downtown Eastside neighbourhood. In 1993 the couple founded the Living Traditions Writers Group, to encourage Indigenous writers.

In 2010 Loyie was diagnosed with cancer. He died at the age of 82 in Edmonton, Alberta on April 18, 2016. He had three sons: Edmund, Lawrence, and Brad.

In 2019, Loyie's archive was donated to the Residential School History and Dialogue Centre at the University of British Columbia. It has become a major resource for oral and written histories, and creative works related to the residential schools.

== Writing ==
Loyie and Brissenden wrote eight children's books together that were drawn from Loyie's traditional Cree childhood and his six years in residential school.

Loyie explored his residential school experience in a variety of genres: his play Ora Pro Nobis (Pray for Us) (published in 1998 with one by Vera Manuel), When the Spirits Dance (2006), and Residential Schools: With the Words and Images of Survivors (2014).

=== Legacy and honours ===
Loyie's children's book As Long as the Rivers Flow (2005) recounts his last summer before entering residential school. It won the Norma Fleck Award for Canadian Children's non-fiction. Loyie was the first First Nations author to win this award.

== Published writing ==
=== Plays ===
- Ora Pro Nobis, Pray for Us (1994), first performed in Vancouver, British Columbia.
- Fifty Years Credit (play, 1998), first performed at Carnegie Community Centre, Canada.
- No Way to Say Goodbye (play, 1999), first performed for Aboriginal AIDS Conference, Alberta, Canada.

=== Books ===
- Loyie, Larry (2005). As Long as the Rivers Flow. Illustrated by Heather Holmlund. Groundwood Books. ISBN 9780888996961.
- Loyie, Larry; Brissenden, Constance (2006). When the Spirits Dance: A Cree Boy's Search For the Meaning of War. Theytus. ISBN 978-1-926886-02-2.
- Loyie, Larry; Brissenden, Constance (2005). The Gathering Tree. Illustrated by Heather D. Holmlund. Theytus Books. ISBN 978-1-894778-42-8.
- Loyie, Larry (2011). Tant que couleront les riviéres (in French). Editions Des Plaines.
- Loyie, Larry; Brissenden, Constance (2013). Welcome to the Circle. Illustrated by John Mantha. Pearson Education Canada. ISBN 9780133855227.
- Loyie, Larry (2013). Moon Speaks Cree: A Winter Adventure. Illustrated by Bill Cohen. Theytus. ISBN 978-1-926886-18-3.
- Loyie, Larry (2014). Residential Schools with the Words and Images of Survivors. Brantford, Ontario: Indigenous Education Press. ISBN 978-0-9939371-0-1..
- Loyie, Larry; Brissenden, Constance (2016). Goodbye Buffalo Bay. Theytus Books. ISBN 978-1-894778-62-6.
- Loyie, Larry (2018). Two Plays About Residential School (20th Anniversary ed.). Indigenous Education Press. ISBN 9780993937132.

=== Chapters in Books ===
- Away from Home: American Indian Boarding School Experiences, 1979–2000. Edited by Margaret L. Archuleta, Brenda J. Child and K. Tsianina Lomawaima. Phoenix, Arizona: Heard Museum, (2000). Includes excerpts from Oka Pro Nobis.
- Loyie, Larry. “First Nations People”, in First Nations People in Vancouver Area. Vancouver BC: Linkman Press, Vancouver, (2000).

=== Editorial Work ===
- The Wind Cannot Read (Province of British Columbia Ministry of Advanced Education, Training and Technology, 1992).

== Awards ==
- Canada Post Literacy Award for Individual Achievement, British Columbia (2001).
- Norma Fleck Award for Canadian Children's Non-Fiction for As Long As The Rivers Flow (2003).
- Moonbeam Children's Silver Book Award for Health Issues, for The Gathering Tree (2012).

== Reception ==
Larry Loyie's works have frequently been used in classroom instruction related to the history of residential schools in Canada. Reviews of Goodbye Buffalo Bay have praised Loyie's open and candid writing style in a work that explores his experiences in Canada's residential school system and after.
