= Frieda Wishinsky =

German-born Canadian educator and author

- Born: July 14, 1948 (age 78); Munich
- Education: City College of New York (BA); Ferkauf Graduate School of Psychology (MSc)
- Occupation: Author
- Years active: 1990–present

Frieda Wishinsky (born July 14, 1948) is a German-born Canadian educator and author of children's books.

The daughter of Polish-Jewish parents, she was born in Munich and grew up in Manhattan. She received a BA in International Relations from City College of New York and a MSc Special Education from Ferkauf Graduate School. She has taught special education for children and adults in the United States, Israel and Canada. She now lives in Toronto.

Wishinsky's first book was Oonga Boonga (1990). Her work has been translated into French, German, Hungarian, Danish, Swedish, Dutch, Korean, Spanish and Catalan.

== Selected work ==
- Each One Special (1998) illustrated by Werner Zimmermann, shortlisted for a Governor General's Award
- Please, Louise! (2007) illustrated by Marie-Louise Gay, received the Marilyn Baillie Picture Book Award and the Ruth and Sylvia Schwartz Children’s Book Award
- Maggie Can't Wait (2009) illustrated by Dean Griffiths, received the Christie Harris Illustrated Children's Literature Prize
- You're Mean, Lily Jean (2009) illustrated by Kady MacDonald Denton, shortlisted for the Amelia Frances Howard-Gibbon Illustrator's Award
- Explorers Who Made It…or Died Trying (2011) illustrated by Bill Dickson
- Halifax Explodes (2011) illustrated by P. A. Lewis-MacDougall
- Profiles: Freedom Heroines (2012) was named a top ten book for the Amelia Bloomer Book List in 2014
- A History of just About Everything (2013) with Elizabeth MacLeod, illustrated by Leng Qin, finalist for the Norma Fleck Award and was named a Best Book by the Bank Street Children's Book Committee
- Avis Dolphin (2015) illustrated by Willow Dawson, shortlisted for the Imperial Order Daughters of the Empire Canada Violet Downey Book Award
