= Hugh Brewster =

Canadian writer

- Born: May 26, 1950 (age 76); London, England
- Education: University of Guelph (BA)
- Occupations: Author and editor
- Writing career
- Genre: Children's nonfiction
- Notable awards: Silver Birch Award (1998); Information Book Award (2005); Norma Fleck Award (2008)
- Website: hughbrewster.com

Hugh Brewster (born May 26, 1950, in London, England) is a Canadian writer of nonfiction books for children.

== Biography ==
Brewster was born May 26, 1950, in London, England to Ormond Macmillan and Anne Brewster. He has two older brothers and a younger sister. The family moved to Scotland when Brewster was two, then immigrated to Georgetown, Ontario in 1956.

Brewster received a Bachelor of Arts degree in English with a minor in theatre from the University of Guelph. Following graduation, he was a founding writer for the LGBT magazine The Body Politic. He served as an editor with Scholastic Canada from 1972 to 1981, then continued as an editor with Scholastic in New York City from 1981 to 1984. Beginning in 1984, he worked as an editorial director as Madison Press Books in Toronto.

He published his first children's book, Anastasia's Album, in 1996.

== Awards and honours ==
Awards for Brewster's writing
Year	Title	Award	Result	Ref.
1997	Anastasia's Album	ALSC Notable Children's Books	Selection	
1998	Anastasia's Album	Silver Birch Award	Winner	
1999	Anastasia's Album	Red Cedar Book Award	Winner	
2000	882 ½ Amazing Answers to Your Questions about the Titanic	Quick Picks for Reluctant Young Adult Readers	Selection	
2005	On Juno Beach	Information Book Award	Winner	
2007	Carnation, Lily, Lily, Rose	Governor General's Award for English-language children's literature	Finalist	
2008	Carnation, Lily, Lily, Rose	TD Canadian Children's Literature Award	Finalist	
2008	At Vimy Ridge	Norma Fleck Award	Winner	
2012	Prisoner of Dieppe	Hackmatack Children's Choice Award for English Fiction	Winner	
2015	From Vimy to Victory	Norma Fleck Award	Finalist	
2015	From Vimy to Victory	Silver Birch Award	Nominee	
2015	From Vimy to Victory	TD Canadian Children's Literature Award	Finalist	

== Publications ==
- The Complete Hoser's Handbook, Prentice-Hall Canada, 1983.
- Anastasia's Album: The Last Tsar's Youngest Daughter Tells Her Own Story, Hyperion, 1996.
- Inside the Titanic, Little, Brown and Company, 1997.
- 882 1/2 Amazing Answers to Your Questions about the Titanic, with Laurie Coulter, paintings by Ken Marschall, Scholastic, 1998.
- To Be a Princess: The Fascinating Lives of Real Princesses, with Laurie Coulter, illustrated by Laurie McGaw, HarperCollins, 2001.
- On Juno Beach: Canada's D Day Heroes, Scholastic Canada, 2004.
- At Vimy Ridge: Canada's Greatest World War I Victory, Scholastic Canada, 2007.
- The Other Mozart: The Life of the Famous Chevalier de Saint-George, illustrated by Eric Velasquez, Abrams Books for Young Readers, 2006.
- Carnation, Lily, Lily, Rose: The Story of a Painting, illustrated with paintings by John Singer Sargent, Kids Can Press, 2007.
- Breakout Dinosaurs: Canada's Coolest, Scariest Ancient Creatures Return!, with the curators of the Royal Ontario Museum, illustrated by Alan Barnard, Whitfield Editions, 2007.
- Dieppe: Canada's Darkest Day of World War II, Scholastic Canada, 2009.
- Dinosaurs in Your Backyard: The Coolest, Scariest Creatures Ever Found in the USA!, with Alan Barnard, Harry N. Abrams, 2009.
- Prisoner of Dieppe: World War II, Alistair Morrison, Occupied France, 1942, Scholastic Canada, 2010.
- Deadly Voyage: RMS Titanic, Jamie Laidlaw, April 14, 1912, Scholastic Canada, 2011.
- Gilded Lives, Fatal Voyage: The Titanic's First-Class Passengers and Their World, Crown Publishing Group, 2012.
- From Vimy to Victory: Canada's Fight to the Finish in World War I, Scholastic Canada, 2014.
- Unsinkable Lucile: How a Farm Girl Became the Queen of Fashion and Survived the Titanic, illus. by Laurie McGaw, Firefly Books, 2022.
