= Penelope and the Humongous Burp =

Book by Sheri Radford

- Author: Sheri Radford
- Illustrator: Christine Tripp
- Cover artist: Tripp
- Language: English
- Subject: Burping
- Genre: children's literature
- Published: 2004
- Publisher: Lobster Press
- Publication place: Canada

Penelope and the Humongous Burp is a children's picture book by Sheri Radford and illustrated by Christine Tripp. The book was published in 2004 by Lobster Press.

== Plot ==
Penelope can't control her burping after she drinks a few glasses of grape soda too quickly.

== Reception ==
- A Quill and Quire review says, "With its exuberant pictures, slightly naughty subject matter, silly words ("glurble glooble") and repetitive phrases, Penelope and the Humongous Burp could lead to some comical storytimes."
- The book won an award from Canadian Toy Testing Council for Top Ten Books of the Year in 2005.
- It was nominated for the Blue Spruce Awards in 2007.
