= Kevin Sylvester (Canadian broadcaster) =

Canadian artist

Kevin Sylvester is a Canadian broadcaster, writer, and cartoonist known for writing the Minrs and Neil Flambé novel series.

== Career ==
Based in Toronto, Ontario, Sylvester has written and illustrated a number of best-selling children's books. His most famous series is the "Neil Flambé Capers." The character Neil Flambé was originally used by Kevin during a CBC summer morning broadcast of his ongoing story Neil Flambé and the Case of the Caustic Cumin. The first book, Neil Flambé and the Marco Polo Murders, was voted the 2011 Silver Birch Award winner for Fiction. The second book in the series, Neil Flambé and the Aztec Abduction was a runner-up for the 2012 Silver Birch Award for Fiction. The third, Neil Flambé and the Crusader's Curse is nominated for the 2013 Silver Birch Award for Fiction. The fourth is Neil Flambé and the Tokyo Treasure.

Sylvester's first children’s book Sports Hall of Weird was named a Silver Birch Honour Book in 2006 and a Rocky Mountain Honour Book in 2007. His second children's book, Gold Medal for Weird was released in 2007 and was named a Gold Medal Choice for the Junior Library Guild in the United States. It was also nominated the 2007 Silver Birch award for Non-Fiction. He also won a 2012 Silver Birch as the illustrator for Don't Touch That Toad, written by Cathy Rondina and published by Kids Can Press.

He has written a picture book for younger children called Splinters. It has been nominated for the 2013 Blue Spruce Award.

Sylvester has written two books for Annick Press that reveal what happens behind the scenes at sporting events and big stage shows. Game Day: Meet the People Who Make Sports Happen, is about people who work in sports and Showtime: Meet the People Behind the Scenes is about live stage events. "Game Day" was nominated for the 2012 Silver Birch Award for Non-Fiction.

Kevin Sylvester co-wrote and illustrated Follow Your Money: Who Gets It, Who Spends It, Where Does It Go? with Michael Hlinka. This is also a children's book that teaches the basics of finance.

His book for adults, Shadrin Has Scored for Russia, was nominated for the Stephen Leacock Award for Humour in 2002.

He also wrote Minrs in 2015 which has become well known to middle school students Sylvester later wrote two sequels, Minrs 2 and Minrs 3, in 2016 and 2018, respectively.

From 1999 to 2006, he was a popular sportscaster for national radio sports on CBC Radio, and anchored the radio coverage for four Olympic Games. He is often heard filling in on CBC shows such as The Sunday Edition, Sounds Like Canada and The Current, and has also been featured on Richardson's Roundup, Ideas and The Inside Track.

As an illustrator, he is a contributor to the Literary Review of Canada, and his work has been auctioned off raising tens of thousands of dollars for charities.
