= Barbara Greenwood =

Canadian educator and writer

- Born: September 14, 1940 (age 86); Toronto, Ontario, Canada
- Occupations: educator and author of children's books

Barbara Greenwood (née Auer; born 1940) is a Canadian educator and author of children's books. She has served as president of the Canadian Society of Children's Authors, Illustrators and Performers (CANSCAIP).

== Biography ==
Barbara Auer was born in Toronto on September 14, 1940, to George A. and Anne (née Fisher) Auer. She attended Toronto Teachers College, then received a Bachelor of Arts from the University of Toronto.

In 1966, she married Robert E. Greenwood; the couple had four children, including Ed Greenwood, the creator of the Forgotten Realms.

Greenwood began her career as an elementary school teacher in the 1960s, after which she became a freelance creative writing teacher. Later, she was a visiting lecturer at Ryerson University (1984-2001), the University of New Brunswick (1989, 1991), and the University of Toronto (1990, 1992). She has been president of CANSCAIP and edited a number of books the organization published.

Her story "A Major Resolution" received the Vicky Metcalf Short Story Award. She has written short stories and articles for the Canadian Children's Annual and various anthologies.

== Awards and honours ==
Gold Rush Fever is a Junior Library Guild book.

Awards for Greenwood's works
Year	Title	Award	Result	Ref.
1995	A Pioneer Story	Mr. Christie's Book Award for 8 to 11	Winner	
1995	A Pioneer Story	Ruth & Sylvia Schwartz Children's Book Award for Children's Literature	Winner	
1999	The Last Safehouse	Norma Fleck Award	Finalist	
2003	Gold Rush Fever	Rocky Mountain Book Award	Shortlist	
2003	Gold Rush Fever	Silver Birch Award	Shortlist	
2007	Factory Girl	INDIES Award for Juvenile Fiction (Children's)	Finalist	
2007	Factory Girl	Norma Fleck Award	Finalist	

== Selected works ==
- The CANSCAIP Companion: A Biographical Record of Canadian Children's Authors, Illustrators and Performers. 1991.
- Speak Up! Speak Out!. With Bob Greenwood, Illustrated by Graham Pilsworth. Pembroke. 1994. ISBN 9781551380308.
- A Pioneer Sampler: The Daily Life of a Pioneer Family In 1840. Houghton Mifflin. 1995. ISBN 0395715407.
- Pioneer Crafts. Kids Can Press. 1997. ISBN 1550743597.
- The Kids Book of Canada. Illustrated by Jock MacRae. Kids Can Press. 1997. ISBN 1550743155.
- The Last Safehouse: A Story of the Underground Railroad. Illustrated by Heather Collins. 1998. ISBN 1550745077.
- A Pioneer Thanksgiving: A Story of Harvest Celebrations in 1841. Illustrated by Heather Collins. Kids Can Press. 1999. ISBN 1550747444.
- Gold Rush Fever: A Story of the Klondike, 1898. Illustrated by Heather Collins. Kids Can Press. 2001. ISBN 1550748521.
- Factory Girl. Kids Can Press. 2007. ISBN 9781553376484.
