= My Childhood Under Fire =

Book by Nadja Halilbegovich

- Author: Nadja Halilbegovich
- Subject: Bosnian War
- Published: Bosnia; 1994, 1998 (Our Children); U.S. and Canada; 1998 (Kids Can Press) (English)
- Publication place: Bosnia

My Childhood Under Fire: A Sarajevo Diary is the Bosnian War diary of the speaker and peace activist Nadja Halilbegovich. The journal was written when Nadja was between ages 12 and 16 and documents the war and Siege of Sarajevo from 1992-1995. The diary was originally published in Bosnia by the humanitarian organization Our Children in two parts: Sarajevsko Djetinjstvo Ratom Ranjeno (Sarajevo Childhood Wounded by War) in 1994 and Sarajevsko Djetinjstvo Ratom Ranjeno: Drugi Dio (Sarajevo Childhood Wounded by War: Part 2) in 1998. The abridged diary was published in English under the current title by Kids Can Press in the U.S. and Canada in 2006. It has also been published in French in 2007 and Indonesian in 2008. The book chronicles four years of war seen through the eyes of a child and teenager.

== Awards ==
My Childhood Under Fire has received the following recognitions:

- Winner of Books for the Teen Age List from the New York Public Library 2007
- Best Book Award in Social Studies by the Society of School Librarians International 2006
- Bronze Medal Winner of the Independent Publisher Book Award 2007
- Norma Fleck Award for Canadian Children's Nonfiction Literature 2006 Nominee
- Golden Oak Award of the Ontario Library Association 2007 Nominee
- Information Book Award in Children's Literature from Roundtables of Canada 2007 Nominee

The book is popular as a school text and excerpted in the book Elements of Literature, Second Course.
