= Beverly Schwartz =

American behavioral scientist

Beverly Schwartz is an American behavioral scientist, business executive, non-profit leader and author specializing in social marketing and social entrepreneurship. From 2004 to 2016 she was the Vice President of Global Marketing of Ashoka: Innovators for the Public. Her book Rippling: How Social Entrepreneurs Spread Innovation Throughout the World was honored with the 2013 Silver Nautilus Book Award and the 2013 Axiom Business Book Award. It has been translated into 4 additional languages - Spanish (Ediciones Urano), Chinese (China Citic Press), Japanese and Korean (Eijipress).

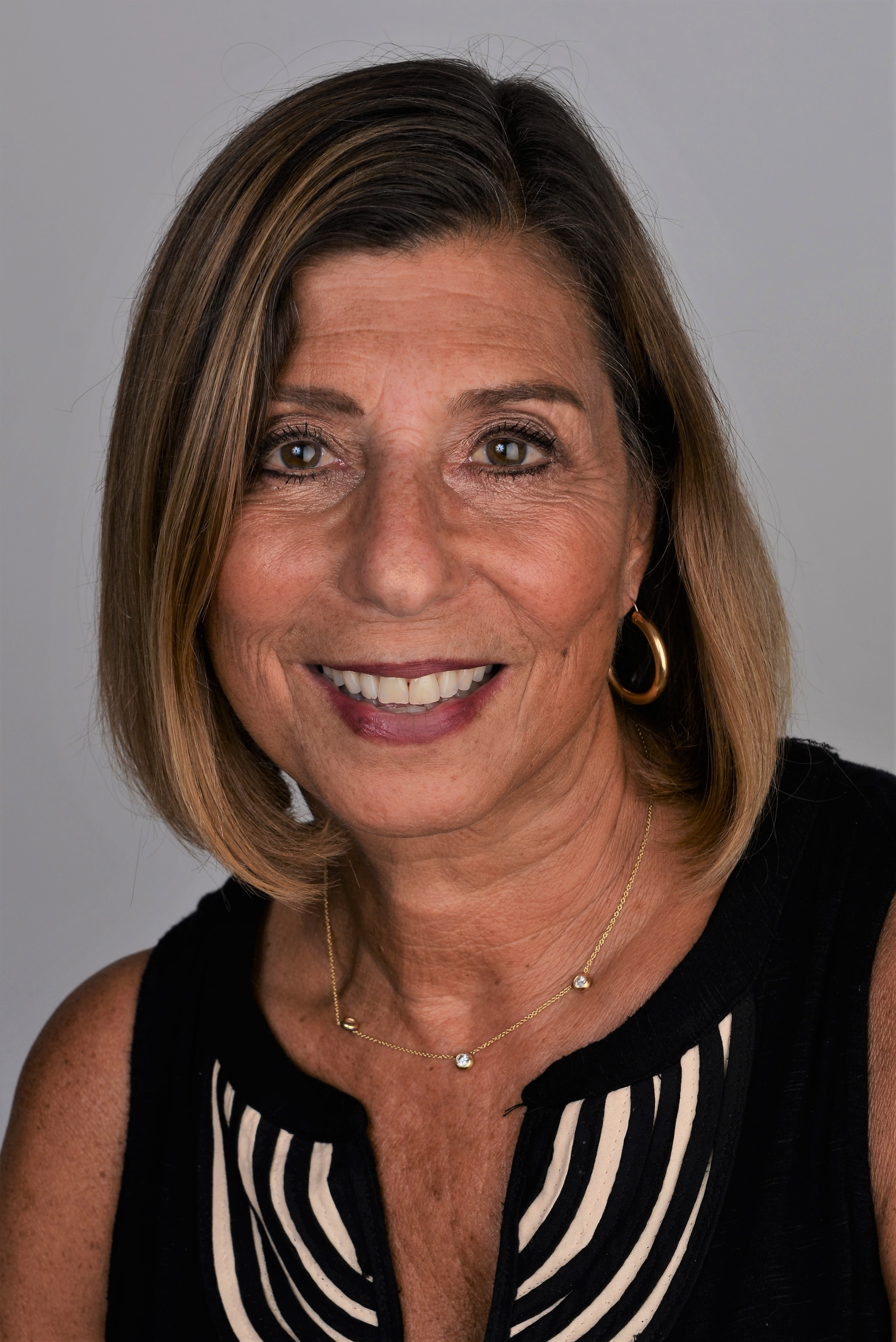
Picture of Beverly Schwartz

== Life & Background ==
Beverly Schwartz was born in New York City and has spent time living in Minneapolis, San Francisco, Atlanta, and Washington D.C. She attended Queens College, City University of New York and the University of Minnesota, earning a Master of Science degree . She currently lives in Washington D.C.

== Career ==
Humanitarian and community advocacy

Schwartz worked for the Minnesota Lung Association and also served as the executive director of the Minnesota Association for Non-Smoker's Rights, where she participated in writing, lobbying, and supporting statewide public health legislation, resulting in the passage of the Minnesota Clean Indoor Air Act, the first non-smoking statewide ordinance in the US. She also worked at the United States Center for Disease Control from 1987 to 1992, where she helped develop and manage the "American Response to AIDS" campaign and other educational and awareness programs . While at the CDC, she was also acting Director of Communications for the National Center for Smoking and Health. She has additionally served as an advocate for global educational reform during her tenure as Vice President of Social Marketing with the Academy for Educational Development. In April 2018, Schwartz filled a vacancy position as an Advisory Neighborhood Commissioner (ANC) for Dupont Circle, Washington DC; and was subsequently elected to the position for a 2-year term in Nov 2019.

Social marketing

From 1998 to 2004 Schwartz was Senior Vice President at Fleishman Hillard, a global communications firm, where she chaired their Social Impact Global Practice Group. She assisted in the development of the organization's social and strategic marketing plans and also served as the Project Director for the non-advertising portion of the 5 year and 50 million dollar Youth Anti-Drug Media Campaign under the guidance of the Office of National Drug Control Policy.

== Published works ==
Schwartz is an author, publishing multiple works, including her award-winning book Rippling: How Social Entrepreneurs Spread Innovation Throughout the World. She is a former associate editor of the Social Marketing Quarterly.

- Schwartz, Beverly (2012). Rippling: How Social Entrepreneurs Spread Innovation Throughout the World. Jossey-Bass. 288 pages. ISBN 978-1118138595
- Schwartz, B., Middlestadt, S., & Verzosa, C. (1994). Social Marketing Research on Educating Girls in Bangladesh. The Forum for Advancing Basic Education and Literacy. 3(2) pages 8–9.
- Schwartz, Beverly (2004). Special Issue: The National Youth Anti-Drug Media Campaigns: Lessons Learned in Executing an Integrated Public Health Campaign. Social Marketing Quarterly. 10(2). pages 3–6, 79.
- Schwartz, Beverly (2010). The Freedom to Innovate: The Contributions of Social Entrepreneurs to the Field of Global Public Health. Igniting the Power of Community. pages 77–91. ISBN 978-0-387-98156-7
- Schwartz, Beverly (2012). Turning What Is, and What If, into What Can Be. Peace Corps WorldView Magazine. pages 34–35.
- Schwartz, Beverly (2013). This Is Our Time for Storytelling: 3 1/2 Tips for Writing about Social Change from an Award-Winning Author. Forbes.
- Schwartz, Beverly (2013). The Road from Garbage to Gold. BeInkandescent.
- Schwartz, B. & Khanna, D. (2013). Future Forward: Innovations for Youth Employment in Africa. Innovations. Special Edition 2013 Global Youth Economic Opportunities Conference. pages 255–266.
- Schwartz, Beverly (2013). Are You a Prisoner of the Past or will you be a Pioneer of the Future? Huffington Post.
- Schwartz, Beverly (2013). Unleash the World's Entrepreneurial Geniuses. CNN Opinion.
- Schwartz, Beverly (2013) What's Ahead for Social Entrepreneurs. Forbes.

== Honors and awards ==
- 2013 Silver Nautilus Book Award for Rippling: How Social Entrepreneurs Spread Innovation Throughout the World
- 2013 Axiom Business Book Award for Rippling: How Social Entrepreneurs Spread Innovation Throughout the World

== Boards and committees ==
- APOPO (HeroRats) USA - Member of the Board | Present | 2015–Present
- Harwood Institute for Public Innovation – Member of the Board of Directors | 2013–Present
- Advisory Neighborhood Commissioner, Dupont Circle, Washington, DC., 2017 - 2020
- National Hospice Foundation – Member of the Board of Trustees | 2008 - 2014
