= Jessica Scott Kerrin =

Canadian children's writer

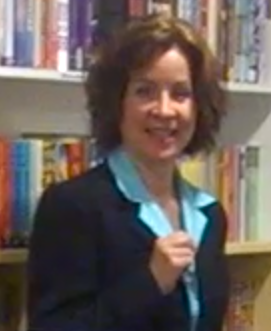
Jessica Scott Kerrin

Jessica Scott Kerrin is a Canadian children's writer who is best known for her fiction books for young readers.

== Early life and education ==
Kerrin was born and raised in Alberta, where she completed a degree in political science and psychology at the University of Calgary. She then studied at the Nova Scotia College of Art and Design. Upon graduation with a fine arts degree in 1988, she later completed a graduate degree in public administration from Dalhousie University.

== Career ==
Kerrin remained in Halifax after graduation, and has written a number of children's books including Martin Bridge, a best-selling eight-book series of short stories; a trilogy called The Lobster Chronicles; two mystery novels inspired by the Old Burying Ground called The Spotted Dog Last Seen and The Missing Dog is Spotted; a travel adventure called "The Things Owen Wrote"; and a picture book called "The Better Tree Fort."

Kerrin primarily includes Atlantic east coast characters and settings in her work. Her books have been translated into French, Russian, Swedish, Turkish and Croatian.

== Bibliography ==
- Clear Skies
- The Better Tree Fort
- The Things Owen Wrote
- The Missing Dog is Spotted
- The Spotted Dog Last Seen
- Spit Feathers: The Lobster Chronicles
- A Narrow Escape: The Lobster Chronicles
- Lower the Trap: The Lobster Chronicles
- Martin Bridge: Onwards and Upwards
- Martin Bridge: The Sky's the Limit
- Martin Bridge: In High Gear
- Martin Bridge: Out of Orbit
- Martin Bridge: Sound the Alarm
- Martin Bridge: Blazing Ahead
- Martin Bridge: On the Lookout
- Martin Bridge: Ready for Takeoff

== Reception ==
- Lower the Trap: The Lobster Chronicles Kirkus saw "A cast of colorful characters and a satisfying ending will leave readers wondering whose story is next." while Jamais Jochim of Portland Book Review stated that "Although the use of scientific names for a number of species is acceptable given Graeme’s interests in biology, at times it weighs down the text." but concluded that "Judging by the first entry in the series, it looks like The Lobster Chronicle will be a fun trilogy." The Toronto Star found "School social relations and an accessible plot combine with regional issues in this story..."

== Recognition ==
- Shortlisted for the 2014 Book of the Year for Children Award by the Canadian Library Association
- Best Books of Exceptional Caliber, Canadian Children's Book Centre
- Top Books List, New York City Public Library
- Best Book List, Horn Book Magazine
- Notable Book List, American Library Association
