= Elizabeth MacLeod =

Canadian writer

Elizabeth MacLeod CM is a Canadian author from Toronto. Her biographies are written for elementary students.

She was made a Member of the Order of Canada on 31 December 2025.

== Bibliography ==
=== Biographies ===
- Alexander Graham Bell: An Inventive Life, Kids Can Press (Toronto, Ontario, Canada), 1999. ISBN 978-1-55074-456-9
  - Review, School Library Journal, 1999
  - Review, Booklist, 1999
- Lucy Maud Montgomery: A Writer's Life, Kids Can Press (Toronto, Ontario, Canada), 2001.
- The Wright Brothers: A Flying Start, Kids Can Press (Toronto, Ontario, Canada), 2002.
  - Review, School Library Journal, 2002
  - Review, Booklist, 2002
- Albert Einstein: A Life of Genius, Kids Can Press (Toronto, Ontario, Canada), 2003.
- Helen Keller: A Determined Life, Kids Can Press (Toronto, Ontario, Canada), 2004.
  - Review, School Library Journal, 2004
  - Review, Booklist, 2004
- Marie Curie: A Brilliant Life, Kids Can Press (Toronto, Ontario, Canada), 2004.
  - Review, Booklist, 2004
- Harry Houdini: A Magical Life, Kids Can Press (Toronto, Ontario, Canada), 2005.

=== Other works ===
- MacLeod, Elizabeth, and June Bradford. Bake and Make Amazing Cakes. Kids can do it. Toronto: Kids Can Press, 2001. ISBN
  - Review, School Library Journal, 2001.
- MacLeod, Elizabeth and Frieda Wishinsky. Illustrated by Qin Leng. A History of Just About Everything: 180 Events, People and Inventions That Changed the World Toronto:Kids Can Press (2013), finalist for Norma Fleck Award
- MacLeod, Elizabeth, illustrated by Sydney Smith Canada Year by Year Toronto: Kids Can Press (2016). received the Norma Fleck Award
