= Alphabeasts =

Children's picture book

- Alphabeasts
- Author: Wallace Edwards
- Language: English
- Genre: Juvenile Literature
- Published: 2002
- Publication place: Canada
- ISBN: 978-1-55337-386-5

Alphabeasts is a children's picture book, written and illustrated by Wallace Edwards, and published in 2002. The book uses illustrations of anthropomorphized animals to teach young learners the English alphabet. Alphabeasts won a Canadian Governor General's Literary Award in 2002 and was named a Gold Medal Book of the Year by ForeWord Reviews Magazine.
