= Heather Collins =

Canadian children's book illustrator (born 1946)

- Born: July 22, 1946 (age 80); Montreal, Quebec, Canada
- Education: Ontario College of Art
- Occupation: Illustrator

Heather Collins (born July 22, 1946) is a Canadian children's book illustrator.

She was born in Montreal, Quebec and studied at the Ontario College of Art. She now lives in Toronto.

She illustrated A Pioneer Story: The Daily Life of a Canadian Family in 1840 (1994) with text by Barbara Greenwood. The book received the Ruth and Sylvia Schwartz Children's Book Award, the Information Book Award from the Children's Literature Roundtables of Canada and a Mr. Christie's Book Award.

== Selected work ==
Books illustrated include:

- Holiday in the Woods (1976) text by Anne Francis (pen name of Florence Bird)
- Fair Play (1982) text by Paul Kropp
- Woosh! I Hear a Sound (1985) text by Emily Hearn
- The Wimp (1985) text by John Ibbitson
- This Little Piggy (1987) text by Heather Collins
- Hiding (1993) text by Dorothy Aldis
- The Kids Canadian Plant Book (1996) text by Pamela Hickman
