= Jan Thornhill =

Canadian writer & illustrator (born 1955)

- Born: 1955 (age 70–71); Sudbury, Ontario, Canada
- Occupation: Writer
- Writing career
- Genres: science, children's literature
- Notable works: I Found a Dead Bird, The Wildlife ABC

Jan Thornhill (born 1955 in Sudbury, Ontario) is a Canadian writer and illustrator of educational books on science and nature for children. She was the 2015 winner of the Vicky Metcalf Award for Literature for Young People, a lifetime achievement award presented by the Writers' Trust of Canada, and won the Norma Fleck Award in 2007 for her book I Found a Dead Bird: The Kids' Guide to the Cycle of Life & Death.

A graduate of the Ontario College of Art, Thornhill has illustrated many but not all of her own works. She won UNICEF's Ezra Jack Yeats International Award for illustration in 1990 for The Wildlife 123, and has been a three-time nominee for the Governor General's Award for English-language children's illustration at the 1988 Governor General's Awards for The Wildlife ABC, the 1989 Governor General's Awards for The Wildlife 123 and the 2017 Governor General's Awards for The Tragic Tale of the Great Auk.

She has also published the adult short story collection Drought, which was a shortlisted nominee for the ReLit Awards in 2001, and has drawn illustrations for general interest magazines including The Idler.

== Works ==
- The Wildlife ABC (1988)
- The Wildlife 123 (1989)
- A Tree in a Forest (1991)
- Crow & Fox and Other Animal Legends (1993)
- Wild in the City (1996)
- Before & After: A Book of Nature Timescapes (1997)
- Drought (2001)
- Folktails: Animal Legends from Around the World (2007)
- This Is My Planet: The Kids' Guide to Global Warming (2007)
- Who Wants Pizza?: The Kids' Guide to the History, Science and Culture of Food (2010)
- Is This Panama? A Migration Story (2013)
- Kyle Goes Alone (2015)
- The Tragic Tale of the Great Auk (2016), received the TD Canadian Children's Literature Award
