= Paul Fitzgerald (journalist) =

American journalist

- Muhammad Khurshid on Pakistan violence, US dollars. Threat from, government, Taliban, war lords, journalists at risk. Gould and Fitzgerald put events in historical context and discuss threat to them from war lord Gulbuddin Hekmatyar.
- Occupation: Journalist
- Notable work: Crossing Zero: The AfPak War at the Turning Point of American Empire, Invisible History: Afghanistan's Untold Story, The Voice

Paul Fitzgerald is an American journalist.

== Bibliography ==
- Crossing Zero: The AfPak War at the Turning Point of American Empire (City Lights Publishers, 2010) ISBN 978-0-87286-513-6.
- Invisible History: Afghanistan's Untold Story (City Lights Publishers, 2009) ISBN 978-0872864948
- The Voice (CreateSpace, 2008) ISBN 978-1439212011
- End of illusion (BookSurge, 2001)
- The Valediction: Three Nights of Desmond (TrineDay, 2021) ISBN 978-1634243940
