= Ashok Gangadean =

Trinidadian philosopher (born 1941)

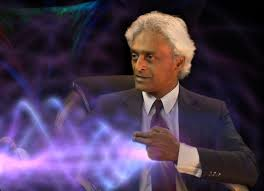

Ashok Gangadean (born September 26, 1941) is a Trinidadian philosopher, author and spiritual activist. He is the Margaret Gest Professor of Global Philosophy at Haverford College in Haverford, Pennsylvania and the Founder and Director of the Global Dialogue Institute.

== Biography ==
Gangadean received his PhD in philosophy from Brandeis University. He was the first Director of the Margaret Gest Center for the Cross-Cultural Study of Religion at Haverford, and has spoken at various professional conferences on interfaith dialogue and east–west comparative philosophy. He is currently the Co-Convenor of the recently formed World Commission on Global Consciousness and Spirituality.

== Works ==
- Meditative Reason: Towards Universal Grammar (1993)
- Between Worlds: The Emergence of Global Reason (1998)
- Meditations of Global First Philosophy (2008)
- Awakening the Global Mind: A New Philosophy for Healing Ourselves and Our World (2008)
