= Nadja Halilbegovich =

Author, speaker, and peace activist

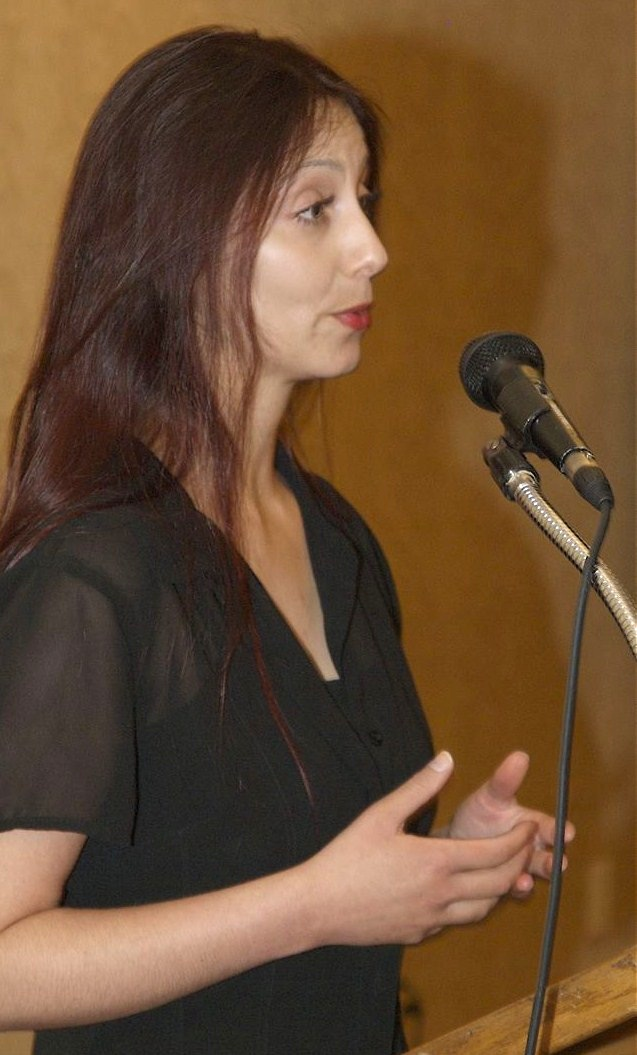
- Speaking in Toronto in 2010
- Born: July 29, 1979 (age 47)
- Education: Butler University
- Occupations: Author, speaker, peace activist
- Notable work: My Childhood Under Fire (diary of her childhood in the Bosnian War and Siege of Sarajevo)
- Website: www.nadjapeace.com

Nadja Halilbegovich (Bosnian: Nađa Halilbegović, born July 29, 1979) is an author, speaker, peace activist and survivor of the Bosnian War and the Siege of Sarajevo.

== Childhood ==
Before the war, Halilbegovich sang and played guitar with Palcici, Sarajevo's internationally-known children's choir. The war broke out when she was 12. She was wounded by a bombshell a year later in 1992. Halilbegovich began sharing her diary entries and reading her poems on the National Radio and was hired to host her own show called "The Music Box" that broadcast about the war from the perspective of a 13-year-old.

In 1993 four of her poems were featured in the book "Mom I don't want to go to the basement!" The title referenced all the time that the citizens of Sarajevo spent during the incessant bombings. At age 14, the first half of her diary was published in Bosnia as "Sarajevo's Childhood Wounded By War." In January 1995, National Dutch Television did a documentary of her life.

Near the end of the war, Halilbegovich escaped from Bosnia and became a refugee in the United States. Though she spoke little English when she arrived, she finished three years of high school in two years. Meanwhile, the sequel to her war diary was published in Bosnia. She was on hand to witness the finalizing of the Dayton Agreement in Dayton, Ohio that brought an end to the hostilities in Bosnia.

== Peace activism ==
In 1997 Nadja received a scholarship from Butler University in Indianapolis, Indiana. She majored in Vocal Performance and Theater. Halilbegovich became a popular speaker and peace activist, balancing her college schedule with speaking engagements at such events as the Global Young Leaders Conference in Washington D.C., the State of the World Forum in San Francisco and The Summit on Youth and Peace in Orlando with Desmond Tutu.

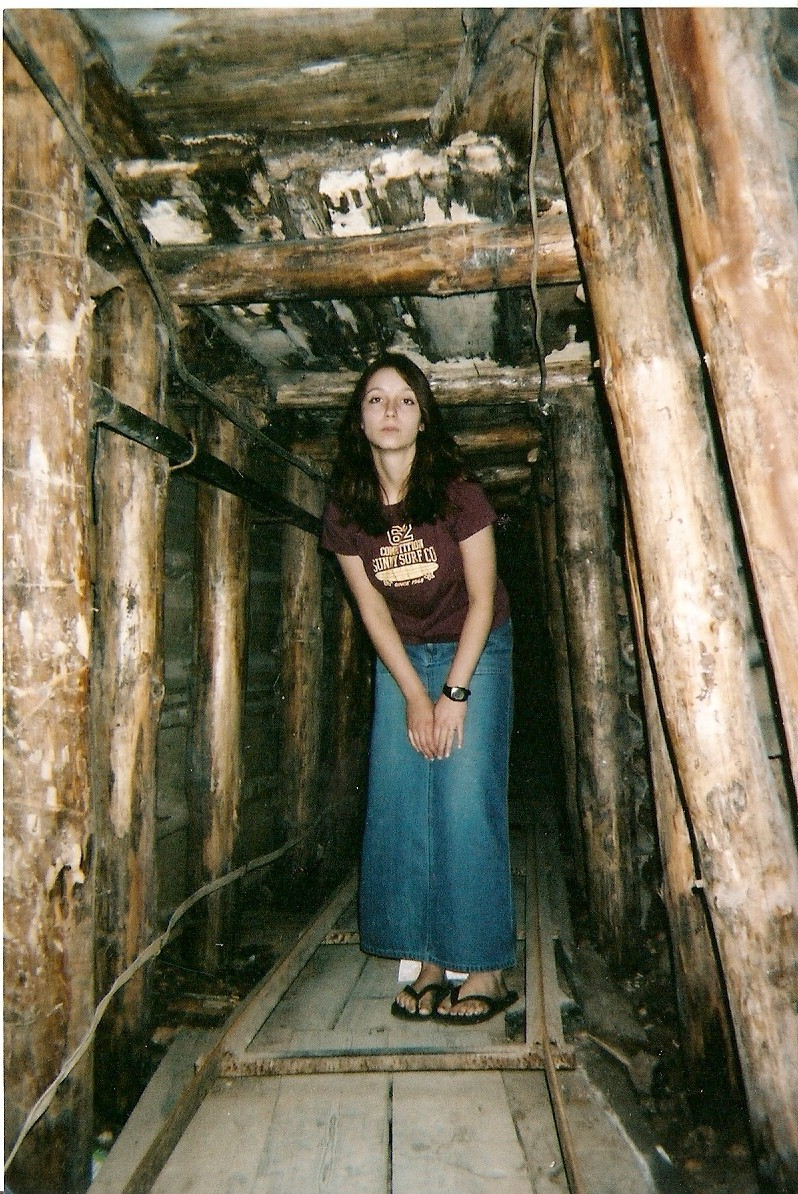
Visiting a tunnel in Sarajevo

In 1999 her story was told in the book "The Courage To Give" by Jackie Waldman. In 2000 she was featured alongside the Dalai Lama and Mother Teresa in the book "Architects of Peace" by Michael Collopy. In March, 2001 she was honored with the first Woman of Distinction Award from Butler University. On graduating in 2002, she embarked on a 9-month speaking tour throughout the U.S. and Canada on behalf of Free The Children.

In 2006, both parts of her diary were published in the U.S. and Canada as "My Childhood Under Fire: A Sarajevo Diary". The book has won numerous awards and has been translated into French and Indonesian.

On September 9, 2006 Halilbegovich was one of 112 speakers at the dropping knowledge Table of Free Voices. The speakers simultaneously answered 100 questions posed from around the world on the state of the world today. This nine-hour global streaming event was held in Berlin on the site of the first Nazi book burning.

In 2009 Halilbegovich was featured in the textbook "Elements of Literature, Second Course", which compares Halilbegovich's book, "My Childhood Under Fire: A Sarajevo Diary" to "The Diary of a Young Girl" by Anne Frank.

On December 22, 2013 Halilbegovich received an honorary Doctorate from Butler University.

== See also ==
- Zlata Filipović, who also wrote a diary of the Bosnian War and Siege of Sarajevo
