= Sheri Radford =

British Columbian author

- Occupation: Author
- Writing career
- Genre: Children's Literature

Sheri Radford is a Canadian author and children's literature writer. She was born in New Westminster and raised in Ladysmith. She also lived in Victoria for several years and currently lives in Vancouver. Radford has written stories, poems, plays, articles, essays, and television scripts. She has a Bachelor of Arts in English and Creative Writing from the University of Victoria. Radford was the editor of Where Vancouver and Where Whistler magazines for many years. She has written five children books: Penelope and the Humongous Burp, Penelope and the Monsters, Penelope and the Preposterous Birthday Party, It's Following Me, and Not Just Another Princess Story. Her books have won several awards.
