= Willow Dawson =

Canadian cartoonist and illustrator

Willow Dawson is a Canadian cartoonist and illustrator known for her contributions to graphic novels, picture books, and illustrated fairy tale collections.

== Early life and education ==
Dawson was born in Vancouver, Canada. According to The Tyee, in her childhood, Dawson experienced life-threatening asthma, and the medications she took destroyed her kidneys; doctors advised her parents that she would not live beyond adolescence. Her health issues led her to spend much time drawing. Her father's work as an artist also exposed her to various mediums of art. She went on to study at the Ontario College of Art & Design in Toronto, where she graduated in 2006.

== Notable works ==
The Tyee highlighted Dawson's contribution to the superhero comic anthology Girls Who Bite Back: Witches, Mutants, Slayers and Freaks, and the comic Mother May I, which touches upon the topic of date rape. Emily Pohl-Weary's Violet Miranda: Girl Pirate, a graphic novel told in four parts, was illustrated by Dawson. The first entry, published in 2005, was noted in Broken Pencil magazine as a "beautifully illustrated black and white saga" with "much promise."

In 2008, she illustrated author Susan Hughes's graphic novel, No Girls Allowed, telling the story of various women throughout history who disguised themselves as men. Dawson used ink and acrylic on cardboard to create stark black-and-white images of these historical women. The book received positive reviews from Boing Boing, the School Library Journal, and Booklist. In 2012, she illustrated The Big Green Book of the Big Blue Sea about the ocean ecosystem. It contains science experiments and activities designed for children in the junior grades.

Dawson was approached by Penguin Canada to create a historical graphic novel about the Canadian suffragette Nellie McClung, which led to the book Hyena in Petticoats. Since McClung considered farm life to be the underpinning to her political and literary success, Dawson created page borders with banners inspired by the covers of 1900s farming catalogues and tiny, moving animals reflecting the theme of each chapter. The book was reviewed in CM Magazine and Quill & Quire.

A School Library Journal reviewer said Dawson's 2015 picture book, The Wolf-Birds, was a "stellar introduction to forest ecology". It was also reviewed by Publishers Weekly and Kirkus Reviews, and was a finalist for the TD Canadian Children's Literature Award in 2016 and Blue Spruce Award in 2017.

She produced the black-and-white comics panels in Frieda Wishinsky's children's book Avis Dolphin (2015), a fictionalized account of the 12-year-old girl who survived the sinking of RMS Lusitania by a German U-boat in 1915. Other credits include illustrations in My Girlfriend's Pregnant! A Teen's Guide to Becoming a Dad by Chloe Shantz-Hilkes (2015).

A 2018 translation of Franz Xaver von Schönwerth's White as Milk, Red as Blood, a 19th-century collection of fairy tales recovered in Germany in 2009, was published by Knopf Canada and illustrated by Dawson. It was deemed by CBC Books to be the "very first fully illustrated, full-colour edition" of the collection.

== Bibliography ==
=== As author ===
- Dawson, Willow (2011). Hyena in Petticoats: The Story Of Suffragette Nellie McClung. Toronto: Puffin Canada. ISBN 978-0-14-317779-1.
- Dawson, Willow (2015). The Wolf-Birds. Owlkids. ISBN 978-1-77147-054-4.

=== As illustrator ===
- Pohl-Weary, Emily (2004). Girls who Bite Back: Witches, Mutants, Slayers and Freaks. Illustrated by Willow Dawson. Sumach Press. ISBN 978-1-894549-33-2.
- Hughes, Susan (2008). No Girls Allowed: Tales of Daring Women Dressed as Men for Love, Freedom and Adventure. Illustrated by Willow Dawson. Kids Can Press Ltd. ISBN 978-1-55453-177-6.
- Becker, Helaine (2012). The Big Green Book of the Big Blue Sea. Illustrated by Willow Dawson. Kids Can Press. ISBN 978-1554537464.
- Wishinsky, Frieda (2015). Avis Dolphin. Illustrated by Willow Dawson. Groundwood Books. ISBN 978-1-55498-489-3. OCLC 884815814.
- Schönwerth, Franz Xaver von (2018). White as Milk, Red as Blood: The Forgotten Fairy Tales of Franz Xaver von Schönwerth. Illustrated by Willow Dawson, translated by Shelley Tanaka. Knopf Canada. ISBN 978-0-345-81217-9.
