= William Gilkerson =

American-Canadian writer, editor and artist (1936–2015)

- Born: 25 July 1936; Chicago, Illinois
- Died: 29 November 2015 (aged 79); Martin's River, Nova Scotia
- Education: Washington University in St. Louis
- Occupations: Writer, editor and artist
- Children: 3
- Writing career
- Notable awards: Governor General's Award for English-language children's literature (2006); Norma Fleck Award (2010); TD Canadian Children's Literature Award (2010)

William Gilkerson (25 July 1936 — 29 November 2015) was an American-Canadian writer, editor and artist. Between the 1960s to 2000s, Gilkerson wrote over ten books including Pirate's Passage, which won the 2006 Governor General's Award for English-language children's literature. Years later, he was nominated for the TD Canadian Children's Literature Award and Norma Fleck Award for his 2010 book A Thousand Years of Pirates. Outside of literature, Gilkerson was an editor at the St. Louis Magazine in 1964 and held multiple jobs at the San Francisco Chronicle from 1964 to 1970. As an artist, his artwork was shown at the U.S. Naval Academy Museum in 1987 and the Independence Seaport Museum in 1998.

== Early life and education ==
On 25 July 1936, Gilkerson was born in Chicago, Illinois and primarily grew up in Midwestern United States. After serving in the United States Marine Corps as a teenager, Gilkerson attended an art program at Washington University in St. Louis during the early 1960s.

== Career ==
Gilkerson began his writing career with the publication of Gilkerson on War in 1964 and The Scrimshander in 1975. In between the publication of his first two books, Gilkerson edited St. Louis Magazine in 1964 and held multiple positions from 1964 to 1970 for the San Francisco Chronicle. Gilkerson resumed his writing career in 1981 and published seven works between the 1980s to 1990s. In the 2000s, Gilkerson started writing a book about pirate history titled Pirate's Passage. Although Gilkerson's intended reading audience was adults, his publisher released the novel as a children's book in 2006.

After the publication of Pirate's Passage, Gilkerson was in talks of creating a movie adaption of his book in 2006. In 2013, it was announced that Donald Sutherland would create a TV movie based on Pirate's Passage. The television movie premiered on CBC Television in 2015. Outside of literature, Gilkerson was an artist who worked in Nova Scotia from 1987 to 2015. As a watercolor painter, his John Paul Jones works were displayed at the U.S. Naval Academy Museum in 1987. In 1998, over forty of his paintings were shown at the Independence Seaport Museum.

== Awards and honours ==
Gilkerson received the 2006 Governor General's Award for English-language children's literature for Pirate's Passage. In 2010, Gilkerson was nominated for the TD Canadian Children's Literature Award and Norma Fleck Award for A Thousand Years of Pirates.

== Personal life ==
Gilkerson died on 29 November 2015 in Martin's River, Nova Scotia. He was married and had three children.
