= Susan Hughes =

Canadian author of children's books (born 1960)

Susan Hughes (born 1960) is a Canadian author of children's books. She is a freelance editor and writer. She provides manuscript evaluation and coaching services for writers.

== Early life ==
Hughes was born in 1960. She attended junior high at Glenview Senior Public School and high school at Lawrence Park Collegiate Institute. She studied English literature at Queen's University at Kingston, then University of Toronto. The summer before her final year at the University of Toronto, she worked for a children's publishing company, which jumpstarted her career.

== Career ==
Hughes began her career working with a publishing company.

She has since published 30 children's books of fiction and nonfiction, including board books, picture books, chapter books, middle-grade novels, a non-fiction graphic middle grade book, and young adult novels. Her books have been translated into over seven languages.

Hughes has been an adjudicator for several children's writing competitions, including those sponsored by CANSCAIP and the Writers' Union of Canada. She has adjudicated for both the short story and poetry categories for the Hamilton Literary Awards (2015, 2012). She was also a volunteer competitor (author) in the Kids' Lit Quiz (2014); was an adjudicator for the CNIB Library Braille Creative Writing Contest (2014); and the junior and senior speech contest for the TDSB (2013). She was a mentor for the Read Liberia (2013) and Read Sierra Leone (2012) projects for CODE. She was one of four Writers-in-Residence for the Toronto District School Board (2012-2013).

== Awards and honours ==
Two of Hughes's books are Junior Library Guild selections: No Girls Allowed (2008) and The Dream of an Education (2026).

Awards for Hughes's works
Year	Work	Award	Result	Ref.
2006	Coming to Canada	Norma Fleck Award	Finalist	
2006	Earth to Audrey	TD Canadian Children's Literature Award	Finalist	
2009	No Girls Allowed	Norma Fleck Award	Finalist	
2010	Case Closed?	Norma Fleck Award	Winner	
2011	Case Closed?	Silver Birch Award	Finalist	
2012	Off to Class	Norma Fleck Award	Finalist	
2012	Off to Class	TD Canadian Children's Literature Award	Finalist	

== Personal life ==
As of 2026, Hughes lives in Toronto.

== Publications ==
- Canada Invents. Owl Kids. 2002.
- The Not-Quite World Famous Scientist. Illustrated by Stephen Taylor. Fitzhenry and Whiteside. 2002. ISBN 9781550416961.
- Let's Call It Canada: Amazing Stories of Canadian Place Names. Maple Tree Press. 2003. ISBN 1894379497.
- The Canadians: Lester B. Pearson. Fitzhenry Whiteside. 2004.
- Coming to Canada: Building a Life in a New Land. Maple Tree Press. 2005. ISBN 1-897066-45-7.
- Earth to Audrey. Illustrated by Stéphane Poulin. Kids Can Press. 2005. ISBN 1-55337-843-1.
- The Frog Prince. Illustrated by June Bradford. Scholastic. 2005. ISBN 9780779154487.
- Raise Your Voice, Lend a Hand, Change the World. Scholastic Canada. 2007. ISBN 9780439946759.
- No Girls Allowed: Tales of Daring Women Dressed as Men for Love, Freedom and Adventure. Illustrated by Willow Dawson. Kids Can Press. 2008. ISBN 978-1-554-53177-6.
- Case Closed? Nine Mysteries Unlocked by Modern Science. Illustrated by Michael Wandelmaier. Kids Can Press. 2010.
- Virginia. Kids Can Press. 2010. ISBN 978-1-55453306-0.
- Off to Class: Incredible and Unusual Schools Around the World. Owl Kids Books. 2011. ISBN 978-1-926818-85-6.
- The Island Horse. Kids Can Press. 2012. ISBN 978-1-55453-592-7.
- Four Seasons of Patrick. Kids Can Press. 2014. ISBN 978-0-88995-505-9.
- Making Canada Home: How Immigrants Shaped This Country. Owl Kids. 2016. ISBN 978-1-77147-202-9.
- Maggie McGillicuddy's Eye for Trouble. Illustrated by Brooke Kerrigan. Kids Can Press. 2016. ISBN 978-1-77138-291-5.
- Suffrage: Canadian Women and the Vote. Illustrated by Meags Fitzgerald. Teach Magazine. 2017. ISBN 9781987834147.
- Up! How Families Around the World Carry Their Little Ones. Illustrated by Ashley Barron. Owl Kids. 2017. ISBN 978-1-77147-176-3.
- Walking in the City with Jane: A Story of Jane Jacobs. Illustrated by Valérie Boivin. Natural Geographic Kids. 2018. ISBN 978-1-77138-653-1.
- What Happens Next. Illustrated by Carey Sookocheff. Owl Kids. 2018. ISBN 978-1-77147-165-7.
- Upsy-Daisy, Baby!. Illustrated by Ashley Barron. Owl Kids. 2019. ISBN 9781771473873.
- Carmen and the House That Gaudí Built. Illustrated by Marianne Ferrer. Owl Kids. 2021. ISBN 978-1-77147-392-7.
- Walking for Water: How One Boy Stood Up for Gender Equality. Illustrated by Nicole Miles. Kids Can Press. 2021. ISBN 978-1-525-30249-7.
- Hooray for Trucks!. Illustrated by Suharu Ogawa. Owl Kids. 2022. ISBN 978-1-77147-467-2.
- Same Here! The Differences We Share. Illustrated by Sophie Casson. Owl Kids. 2022. ISBN 9781771473071.
- Miss Match. Orca. 2025. ISBN 9781459842069.
- The Dream of an Education: How Phymean Noun Built a School. Illustrated by Tida Kheav. Orca. 2026. ISBN 978-1-459-84242-7.

=== Canada Up Close series ===
- Canadian Festivals. Scholastic Canada. 2007. ISBN 9780439939232.
- Canadian Sports. Scholastic Canada. 2009.
- Canada's Birds. Scholastic Canada. 2010. ISBN 9781443100014.
- Canadian Celebrations. Scholastic Canada. 2012. ISBN 9781443107334.

=== Cuba series ===
- Cuba the Culture. Crabtree Publishing Company. 2004. ISBN 0778793265.
- Cuba the Land. Crabtree Publishing Company. 2004. ISBN 9780778793243.
- Cuba the People. Crabtree Publishing Company. 2004. ISBN 0778796949.

=== The Puppy Collection ===
- Bailey’s Visit. Illustrated by Leanne Franson. Scholastic. 2014. ISBN 9781443124096.
- Riley Knows Best. Illustrated by Leanne Franson. Scholastic. 2014. ISBN 9781443124102.
- Murphy Helps Out. Illustrated by Leanne Franson. Scholastic. 2014. ISBN 9781443124119.
- Bijou Needs a Home. Illustrated by Leanne Franson. Scholastic. 2015. ISBN 9781443133586.
- Piper's First Show. Illustrated by Leanne Franson. Scholastic. 2015. ISBN 9781443133609.
- 6Cricket's Close Call. Illustrated by Leanne Franson. Scholastic. 2015. ISBN 9781443133623.
- 7Houdini's Escape. Illustrated by Leanne Franson. Scholastic. 2015. ISBN 9781443146500.
- Nutmeg All Alone. Illustrated by Leanne Franson. Scholastic. 2015. ISBN 9781443146524.
- Cinnamon All Alone. Illustrated by Leanne Franson. Scholastic. 2016. ISBN 9781443146524.
- 1Puppy Pals: Bailey. Sourcebooks Jabberwocky. 2016. ISBN 9781492633945.
- Puppy Pals: Riley. Sourcebooks Jabberwocky. 2016. ISBN 9781492633976.
- Puppy Pals: Murphy. Sourcebooks Jabberwocky. 2016. ISBN 9781492634003.
- Puppy Pals: Bijou. Sourcebooks Jabberwocky. 2017. ISBN 9781492634034.

=== Is it... ? series ===
- Is It Heavy or Light?. Crabtree Publishing Company. 2012. ISBN 9781427179463.
- Is It Hot or Cold?. Crabtree Publishing Company. 2012. ISBN 9781427180629.
- Does It Absorb or Repel Liquid?. Crabtree Publishing Company. 2014. ISBN 9780778705376.
- Does It Sink or Float?. Crabtree Publishing Company. 2014. ISBN 9780778705369.

=== Science of How series ===
- Lights Day and Night: The Science of How Light Works. Illustrated by Ellen Rooney. Kids Can Press. 2021. ISBN 978-1-5253-0319-7.
- Sounds All Around: The Science of How Sound Works. Illustrated by Ellen Rooney. Kids Can Press. 2021. ISBN 978-1-5253-0250-3.

=== Time To series ===
- Bath Time. Annick Press. 2017. ISBN 9781554519477.
- Nap Time. Annick Press. 2017. ISBN 9781554519491.
- Play Time. Annick Press. 2017. ISBN 9781554519514.

=== Wild Paws series ===
- Bobcat Rescue. Illustrated by Heather Graham. Scholastic Canada. 2003. ISBN 9780545985253.
- Lonely Wolf Pup. Illustrated by Susan Gardos. Scholastic Canada. 2003. ISBN 9780439989848.
- Bunnies in Trouble. Illustrated by Heather Graham. Scholastic Canada. 2004. ISBN 9780439989848.
- Cubs All Alone. Illustrated by Heather Graham. Scholastic Canada. 2004. ISBN 0439961289.
- Orphaned Beluga. Illustrated by Heather Graham. Scholastic Canada. 2004. ISBN 9780439989862.
