= Sean Cassidy =

Canadian artist

Sean Cassidy is a Canadian illustrator and writer of children's books. He started writing in 1995.

He was born in Montreal and grew up there. After earning a BA and BEd, he taught school for 35 years until he retired in 2005. With his wife, Cassidy travelled widely in North America and Europe, later settling in Orangeville, Ontario.

Cassidy books have won the Ruth Schwartz Children's Book Award and the Mr. Christie's Book Award, and have been nominated for other awards. His books have been included as "Blue Spruce" selections by the Ontario Library Association and as "Shining Willow" selections by Saskatchewan Young Readers' Choice – The Willow Awards.

Sean was president of CANSCAIP, the Canadian Society of Children's Authors, Illustrators and Performers, for a term beginning in 2009, after two years as vice president. He is also a member of the Writers' Union of Canada, the CCBC (Canadian Children's Book Centre), and IBBY (International Board on Books for Young People).

== Works ==
- Hanna Bear's Christmas (ISBN 1-55041-585-9)
- Wake Up, Henry Rooster! (ISBN 1-55041-952-8)
- Gummytoes (ISBN 1-55041-824-6)
- Good to Be Small (ISBN 1-55041-699-5)
- Ten Little Puppies (illustrator) (ISBN 1-55041-654-5)
- The Chicken Cat (illustrator) (ISBN 1-55041-677-4)
