= Kathy Stinson =

Canadian children's writer (born 1952)

- Born: 1952 (age 73–74)
- Occupation: Author
- Writing career
- Genre: Children's Literature

Kathy Stinson (born 1952) is a Canadian children's writer.

== Life ==
Stinson was born in Toronto, taught elementary school there and studied at the University of Toronto.

She lives in Rockwood, Ontario with her partner Peter Carver, a retired editor.

== Reception ==
A Season of Sorrow was said to be "delightfully written with very down-to-earth and realistically portrayed characters" by Tracy's Book Nook. In 2015, Today's Parent magazine named Red is Best one of the 8 best Canadian books for babies and toddlers. Her 2025 book The Rock and the Butterfly was a finalist for the Governor General's Award for Young People's Literature - Illustrated Books.

== Bibliography ==
- Red is Best (1982, Anniversary Edition, 2006)
- Big or Little (1983, Anniversary Edition 2009)
- Mom and Dad Don't Live Together Anymore (1984, Revised Edition 2007)
- Those Green Things (1985, Revised Edition 1995)
- The Bare Naked Book (1986, Anniversary Edition 2006, Revised Edition 2021)
- Seven Clues in Pebble Creek (1987, Revised Edition 2005)
- Teddy Rabbit (1988)
- The Dressed Up Book (1990)
- Who is Sleeping in Aunty's Bed? (1991)
- Steven's Baseball Mitt (1992, Revised Edition 1998)
- Fish House Secrets (1992)
- The Fabulous Ball Book (1993)
- Writing Your Best Picture Book Ever (1994)
- The Great Pebble Creek Bike Race (1994, Revised Edition 2005)
- One Year Commencing (1997)
- King of the Castle (2000)
- Marie-Claire: Dark Spring (2001)
- Marie-Claire: A Season of Sorrow (2002)
- Becoming Ruby (2003)
- Marie-Claire: Visitors (2003)
- Marie-Claire: Angels in Winter (2004)
- One More Clue (2005)
- 101 Ways to Dance (2006)
- A Pocket Can Have A Treasure In It (2008)
- Love Every Leaf: the life of landscape architect Cornelia Hahn Oberlander (2008)
- Big or Little? 25th anniversary edition (2009)
- Highway of Heroes (2010)
- The Man with the Violin (2013), received the TD Canadian Children's Literature Award and was shortlisted for the Ruth and Sylvia Schwartz Children's Book Award
- Harry and Walter (2016)
- The Dance of the Violin (2017)
- The Dog Who Wanted to Fly (2019)
- The Lady with the Books: A Story Inspired by the Remarkable Work of Jella Lepman (2020)
- The Girl Who Loved Giraffes and Became the World's First Giraffologist (2021)
