= Hazel Hutchins =

Canadian children's author

- Occupation: Author
- Genre: Children's Literature

Hazel Hutchins is a Canadian children's author.

With over fifty titles for children, Hazel's picture books, early readers and children's novels have been published in Canada, the U.S., the U.K. and appear around the world in various translations.

Awards for her work include The Marilyn Baillie Picture Book Award for Mattland (2009), The Writers Guild of Alberta Award for Children's Literature for Mattland (2009), The Prince of Tarn (1998), and A Cat of Artimus Pride (1992). Her book Tess (1995) was nominated for a Governor General's Award. Other honors include the Shining Willow Young Readers' Choice Award for TJ and the Cats (2003), Mister Christie and Norma Fleck short lists and her books have appeared numerous times on the Ontario Library Association Tree awards.

Hazel was awarded the Queen Elizabeth 11's Platinum Jubilee Medal in 2022.

== Bibliography ==
- Anastasia Morningstar and the Crystal Butterfly (1984)
- Leanna Builds a Genie Trap (1986)
- Ben's Snow Song (1987)
- Casey Webber, The Great (1988)
- Norman's Snowball (1989)
- Nicholas at the Library (1990)
- Katie's Babbling Brother (1991)
- A Cat of Artimus Pride (1991)
- And You Can Be the Cat (1992)
- The Catfish Palace (1993)
- The Best of Arlie Zack (1993)
- The Three and Many Wishes of Jason Reid (1993)
- Within A Painted Past (1994)
- Believing Sophie (1995)
- Tess - (1995)
- Yancy and Bear (1996)
- Shoot for the Moon, Robyn (1997)
- The Prince of Tarn (1997)
- Robyn's Want Ad (1998)
- It's Raining, Yancy and Bear (1998)
- One Duck (1999)
- Robyn and the Bears (2000)
- Two So Small (2000)
- The Wide World of Suzie Mallard (2000)
- One Dark Night (2001)
- Robyn's Art Attack (2002)
- T J and the Cats (2002)
- I'd Know You Anywhere (2002)
- T J and the Haunted House (2003)
- Robyn Make the News (2003)
- The Sidewalk Rescue (2004)
- Skate, Robyn, Skate! (2004)
- A Second is a Hiccup (2004)
- TJ and the Rockets (2004)
- Beneath the Bridge (2004)
- Robyn's Party-in-the-Park (2004)
- Sarah and the Magic Science Project (2005)
- TJ and the Sports Fanatic (2006)
- The List (2007)
- Robyn's Monster Play (2008)
- Mattland (2008)
- After (2008)
- Together (2009)
- Monster Manners (2011)
- Up Dog and Up Cat (2012)
- Think Again Robin (2012)
- Cat Comes Too and Dog Comes Too (2013)
- What the Snakes Wrote (2013)
- The Great Bike Rescue (2013)
- Snap (2015)
- Anna and the Art Museum (2018)
- The Truth about Wind (2020)
