= Governor General's Award for English-language young people's literature - text =

Canadian literary award

The Governor General's Award for English-language young people's literature - text is a Canadian literary award presented annually to a Canadian writer for a book written in English in the "Young People's Literature - Text" category of the Governor General's Awards for Literary Merit. It is one of four awards recognizing English- and French- language writing and illustration in young people's literature. The awards are administered by the Canada Council.

In name, this award is part of the Governor General's Award program only from 1987 but there was a single award for "Juvenile" literature from 1949 to 1958, and the four present-day "Children's" awards were established in 1975 under a Canada Council name. In the event, the "Canada Council" and "Governor General's" awards have recognized writing in an English-language children's book every year from 1975. The category was known as "Children's Literature - Text" until 2015. In 2016, it became part of the Young People's Literature categories, under the name "Young People's Literature - Text".

== Juvenile fiction ==
The oldest of now-14 annual Governor General's Awards for Literary Merit were inaugurated in 1936. One award for a "juvenile" book was introduced in 1949, and conferred every year to 1958. Throughout those ten years, the juvenile literature award was one of five in the program, all for English-language books.

Juvenile fiction winners, 1949–1958
Year	Author	Title
1949	Richard S. Lambert	Franklin of the Arctic
1950	Donalda Dickie	The Great Adventure
1951	John F. Hayes	A Land Divided
1952	Marie McPhedran	Cargoes on the Great Lakes
1953	John F. Hayes	Rebels Ride at Night
1954	Marjorie Wilkins Campbell	The Nor'westers
1955	Kerry Wood	The Map-Maker
1956	Farley Mowat	Lost in the Barrens
1957	Kerry Wood	The Great Chief
1958	Edith L. Sharp	Nkwala

Two of the Governor General's Award-winning writers also won the Canadian Library Association award for children's book writing, recognizing the same book: Richard Lambert in 1949 and Farley Mowat in 1958. The CLA Book of the Year for Children Award was conferred six times during these ten years.

== Canada Council Children's Literature Prize ==
In 1975 the Canada Council established four annual prizes of $5000 for the year's best English- and French-language children's books by Canadian writers and illustrators. Those "Canada Council Children's Literature Prizes" were continued under the "Governor General's Awards" rubric from 1987, and continue today. Among them the English-language writing prize was awarded every year from 1975.

Canada Council Children's Literature Prize winners, 1975–1986
Year	Author	Title
1975	Bill Freeman	Shantymen of Cache Lake
1976	Myra Paperny	The Wooden People
1977	Jean Little	Listen for the Singing
1978	Kevin Major	Hold Fast
1979	Barbara Smucker	Days of Terror
1980	Christie Harris, illus. by Douglas Tait	The Trouble with Princesses
1981	Monica Hughes	The Guardian of Isis
1982	Monica Hughes	Hunter in the Dark
1983	Sean O'Huigin	The Ghost Horse of the Mounties
1984	Jan Hudson	Sweetgrass
1985	Cora Taylor	Julie
1986	Janet Lunn	Shadow in Hawthorn Bay

Three of the CCCLP-winning English-language writers also won the annual Canadian Library Association award for children's book writing, recognizing the same book. Their CLA Book of the Year for Children Awards are dated one year later: Kevin Major 1979, Cora Taylor 1986, and Janet Lunn 1987. The CLA Book of the Year was inaugurated in 1947 and has been awarded every year since 1963.

Two of the CCCLP-winning English-language writers also won the CLA Young Adult Book Award, recognizing the same book, namely Monica Hughes in 1983 and Janet Lunn in 1987. That is, Janet Lunn and Shadow in Hawthorn Bay (1986) won both the CLA awards for children's and young-adult books.

According to one WorldCat library record The Trouble With Princesses (McClelland & Stewart, 1980) "retells stories about Northwest Coast princesses and compares them with similar Old World princesses", OCLC 9085067. For their collaboration Christie Harris won the CCCLP prize for English-language writing and Douglas Tait won the CLA award for children's book illustration, the 1981 Amelia Frances Howard-Gibbon Illustrator's Award.

== Children's literature (writing) ==
Four books listed below, winners of the English-language writing award under the "Governor General's" name, were also named CLA Book of the Year for Children: Bedard 1991, Wynne-Jones 1994, Porter 2006, and Nielsen 2013. Four of them also won the CLA Young Adult Book Award: Wieler 1990, Johnston 1995, Wynne-Jones 1996, and Brooks 2003.

=== 1980s ===
Award winners, 1987–1989
Year	Author	Title	Result
1987	Morgan Nyberg	Galahad Schwartz and the Cockroach Army	Winner
1987	Welwyn Wilton Katz	False Face	Finalist
1987	Donn Kushner	A Book Dragon	Finalist
1987	Russell McRae	Going to the Dogs	Finalist
1988	Welwyn Wilton Katz	The Third Magic	Winner
1988	Martha Brooks	Paradise Café and Other Stories	Finalist
1988	Brian Doyle	Easy Avenue	Finalist
1988	Jean Little	Little by Little	Finalist
1989	Diana Wieler	Bad Boy	Winner
1989	Kit Pearson	The Sky Is Falling	Finalist
1989	Eliane Corbeil Roe	Circle of Light	Finalist

=== 1990s ===
Award winners, 1990–1999
Year	Author	Title	Result	Ref.
1990	Michael Bedard	Redwork	Winner	
1990	Jan Andrews	The Auction	Finalist	
1990	Brian Doyle	Covered Bridge	Finalist	
1990	Welwyn Wilton Katz	Whale Singer	Finalist	
1991	Sarah Ellis	Pick-Up Sticks	Winner	
1991	Martha Brooks	Two Moons in August	Finalist	
1991	Roch Carrier	A Happy New Year's Day	Finalist	
1991	Jean Little	Stars Come Out Within	Finalist	
1991	Monty Reid	The Last Great Dinosaurs	Finalist	
1992	Julie Johnston	Hero of Lesser Causes	Winner	
1992	Margaret Buffie	My Mother's Ghost	Finalist	
1992	John Ibbitson	1812: Jeremy and the General	Finalist	
1992	Thomas King	A Coyote Columbus Story	Finalist	
1992	Kit Pearson	Looking at the Moon	Finalist	
1993	Tim Wynne-Jones	Some of the Kinder Planets	Winner	
1993	Mitzi Dale	Bryna Means Courage	Finalist	
1993	James Archibald Houston	Drifting Snow: An Arctic Search	Finalist	
1993	Carol Matas	Daniel's Story	Finalist	
1993	Shirley Sterling	My Name Is Seepeetza	Finalist	
1994	Julie Johnston	Adam and Eve and Pinch-Me	Winner	
1994	Sarah Ellis	Out of the Blue	Finalist	
1994	Carol Matas	The Burning Time	Finalist	
1994	Jim McGugan	Josepha: A Prairie Boy's Story	Finalist	
1994	Ken Roberts	Past Tense	Finalist	
1995	Tim Wynne-Jones	The Maestro	Winner	
1995	Beth Goobie	Mission Impossible	Finalist	
1995	Hazel Hutchins	Tess	Finalist	
1995	Welwyn Wilton Katz	Out of the Dark	Finalist	
1995	Diana Wieler	RanVan A Worthy Opponent	Finalist	
1996	Paul Yee	Ghost Train	Winner	
1996	Jan Andrews	Keri	Finalist	
1996	David Boyd	Bottom Drawer	Finalist	
1996	Gillian Chan	Glory Days and Other Stories	Finalist	
1996	Don Gillmor	The Fabulous Song	Finalist	
1997	Kit Pearson	Awake and Dreaming	Winner	
1997	Cheryl Foggo	One Thing That's True	Finalist	
1997	James Heneghan	Wish Me Luck	Finalist	
1997	Teddy Jam	The Fishing Summer	Finalist	
1997	Barbara Nichol	Dippers	Finalist	
1998	Janet Lunn	The Hollow Tree	Winner	
1998	Gayle Friesen	Janey's Girl	Finalist	
1998	Julie Johnston	The Only Outcast	Finalist	
1998	Janet McNaughton	Make or Break Spring	Finalist	
1998	Sarah Withrow	Bat Summer	Finalist	
1999	Rachna Gilmore	A Screaming Kind of Day	Winner	
1999	Don Gillmor	The Christmas Orange	Finalist	
1999	Graham McNamee	Hate You	Finalist	
1999	W. D. Valgardson	The Divorced Kids Club and Other Stories	Finalist	
1999	Frieda Wishinsky	Each One Special	Finalist	

=== 2000s ===
Award winners, 2000–2009
Year	Author	Title	Result	Ref.
2000	Deborah Ellis	Looking for X	Winner	
2000	Martha Brooks	Being with Henry	Finalist	
2000	Sharon E. McKay	Charlie Wilcox	Finalist	
2000	Sheldon Oberman	The Shaman's Nephew	Finalist	
2000	Duncan Thornton	Kalifax	Finalist	
2001	Arthur Slade	Dust	Winner	
2001	Brian Doyle	Mary Ann Alice	Finalist	
2001	Beth Goobie	Before Wings	Finalist	
2001	Julie Johnston	In Spite of Killer Bees	Finalist	
2001	Teresa Toten	The Game	Finalist	
2002	Martha Brooks	True Confessions of a Heartless Girl	Winner	
2002	Alan Cumyn	The Secret Life of Owen Skye	Finalist	
2002	Deborah Ellis	Parvana's Journey	Finalist	
2002	John Lekich	The Losers' Club	Finalist	
2002	Karen Levine	Hana's Suitcase	Finalist	
2003	Glen Huser	Stitches	Winner	
2003	Sarah Ellis	The Several Lives of Orphan Jack	Finalist	
2003	Barbara Haworth-Attard	Theories of Relativity	Finalist	
2003	Kevin Major	Ann and Seamus	Finalist	
2003	Judd Palmer	The Maestro	Finalist	
2004	Kenneth Oppel	Airborn	Winner	
2004	Martine Leavitt	Heck Superhero	Finalist	
2004	Sharon McKay	Esther	Finalist	
2004	Judd Palmer	The Wolf King	Finalist	
2004	Ange Zhang	Red Land, Yellow River: A Story from the Cultural Revolution	Finalist	
2005	Pamela Porter	The Crazy Man	Winner	
2005	Francis Chalifour	After	Finalist	
2005	Barbara Nickel	Hannah Waters and the Daughter of Johann Sebastian Bach	Finalist	
2005	Gail Nyoka	Mella and the N'anga: An African Tale	Finalist	
2005	Shyam Selvadurai	Swimming in the Monsoon Sea	Finalist	
2006	William Gilkerson	Pirate's Passage	Winner	
2006	André Alexis	Ingrid and the Wolf	Finalist	
2006	Glen Huser	Skinnybones and the Wrinkle Queen	Finalist	
2006	Teresa Toten	Me and the Blondes	Finalist	
2006	Budge Wilson	Friendships	Finalist	
2007	Iain Lawrence	Gemini Summer	Winner	
2007	Hugh Brewster	Carnation, Lily, Lily, Rose: The Story of a Painting	Finalist	
2007	Christopher Paul Curtis	Elijah of Buxton	Finalist	
2007	John Wilson	The Alchemist's Dream	Finalist	
2007	Eva Wiseman	Kanada	Finalist	
2008	John Ibbitson	The Landing	Winner	
2008	Alma Fullerton	Libertad	Finalist	
2008	Dianne Linden	Shimmerdogs	Finalist	
2008	Shenaaz Nanji	Child of Dandelions	Finalist	
2008	Mariko Tamaki	Skim	Finalist	
2009	Caroline Pignat	Greener Grass: The Famine Years	Winner	
2009	Shelley Hrdlitschka	Sister Wife	Finalist	
2009	Sharon Jennings	Home Free	Finalist	
2009	Robin Stevenson	A Thousand Shades of Blue	Finalist	
2009	Tim Wynne-Jones	The Uninvited	Finalist	

=== 2010s ===
Award winners, 2010–2019
Year	Author	Title		Ref.
2010	Wendy Phillips	Fishtailing	Winner	
2010	K. L. Denman	Me, Myself and Ike	Finalist	
2010	Lesley Fairfield	Tyranny	Finalist	
2010	Gina McMurchy-Barber	Free as a Bird	Finalist	
2010	Cheryl Rainfield	Scars	Finalist	
2011	Christopher Moore	From Then to Now: A Short History of the World	Winner	
2011	Jan L. Coates	A Hare in the Elephant's Trunk	Finalist	
2011	Deborah Ellis	No Ordinary Day	Finalist	
2011	Kenneth Oppel	This Dark Endeavour	Finalist	
2011	Tim Wynne-Jones	Blink & Caution	Finalist	
2012	Susin Nielsen	The Reluctant Journal of Henry K. Larsen	Winner	
2012	Rachel Hartman	Seraphina	Finalist	
2012	Deborah Kerbel	Under the Moon	Finalist	
2012	Judd Palmer	The Umbrella	Finalist	
2012	Allan Stratton	The Grave Robber's Apprentice	Finalist	
2013	Teresa Toten	The Unlikely Hero of Room 13B	Winner	
2013	Beverley Brenna	The White Bicycle	Finalist	
2013	Shane Peacock	Becoming Holmes	Finalist	
2013	Jean E. Pendziwol	Once Upon a Northern Light	Finalist	
2013	Valerie Sherrard	Counting Back from Nine	Finalist	
2014	Raziel Reid	When Everything Feels Like the Movies	Winner	
2014	Jonathan Auxier	The Night Gardener	Finalist	
2014	Lesley Choyce	Jeremy Stone	Finalist	
2014	Rachel Qitsualik-Tinsley and Sean Qitsualik-Tinsley	Skraelings	Finalist	
2014	Mariko Tamaki	This One Summer	Finalist	
2015	Caroline Pignat	The Gospel Truth	Winner	
2015	Dan Bar-el	Audrey (cow)	Finalist	
2015	Darren Groth	Are You Seeing Me?	Finalist	
2015	Susin Nielsen	We Are All Made of Molecules	Finalist	
2015	Emil Sher	Young Man with Camera	Finalist	
2016	Martine Leavitt	Calvin	Winner	
2016	Mikaela Everett	The Unquiet	Finalist	
2016	E. K. Johnston	A Thousand Nights	Finalist	
2016	Trilby Kent	Once, in a Town Called Moth	Finalist	
2016	Tim Wynne-Jones	The Emperor of Any Place	Finalist	
2017	Cherie Dimaline	The Marrow Thieves	Winner	
2017	Alison Hughes	Hit the Ground Running	Finalist	
2017	Aviaq Johnston	Those Who Run in the Sky	Finalist	
2017	Allan Stratton	The Way Back Home	Finalist	
2017	Danielle Younge-Ullman	Everything Beautiful Is Not Ruined	Finalist	
2018	Jonathan Auxier	Sweep: The Story of a Girl and Her Monster	Winner	
2018	Christopher Paul Curtis	The Journey of Little Charlie	Finalist	
2018	Janice Lynn Mather	Learning to Breathe	Finalist	
2018	Lindsay Mattick and Josh Greenhut	Winnie's Great War	Finalist	
2018	Heather Smith	Ebb & Flow	Finalist	
2019	Erin Bow	Stand on the Sky	Winner	
2019	Brian Francis	Break in Case of Emergency	Finalist	
2019	Sue Farrell Holler	Cold White Sun	Finalist	
2019	Michelle Kadarusman	Girl of the Southern Sea	Finalist	
2019	Jo Treggiari	The Grey Sisters	Finalist	

=== 2020s ===
Award winners, 2020–present
Year	Author	Title	Result	Ref
2020	Eric Walters	The King of Jam Sandwiches	Winner	
2020	Sara Cassidy	Nevers	Finalist	
2020	Polly Horvath	Pine Island Home	Finalist	
2020	Colleen Nelson and Tara Anderson	Harvey Holds His Own	Finalist	
2020	David A. Robertson	The Barren Grounds	Finalist	
2021	Philippa Dowding	Firefly	Winner	
2021	Jo Treggiari	Peter Lee's Notes from the Field	Finalist	
2021	Sharon Jennings	Unravel	Finalist	
2021	Liselle Sambury	Blood Like Magic	Finalist	
2021	Basil Sylvester and Kevin Sylvester	The Fabulous Zed Watson!	Finalist	
2022	Jen Ferguson	The Summer of Bitter and Sweet	Winner	
2022	Deborah Ellis	Step	Finalist	
2022	Joanne Levy	Sorry for Your Loss	Finalist	
2022	Edeet Ravel	A Boy Is Not a Ghost	Finalist	
2022	Kate Story	Urchin	Finalist	
2023	Sarah Everett	The Probability of Everything	Winner	
2023	Michelle Kadarusman	Berani	Finalist	
2023	Zoulfa Katouh	As Long as the Lemon Trees Grow	Finalist	
2023	Iain Lawrence	Fire on Headless Mountain	Finalist	
2023	Kim Spencer	Weird Rules to Follow	Finalist	
2024	Li Charmaine Anne	Crash Landing	Winner	
2024	Cherie Dimaline	Into the Bright Open: A Secret Garden Remix	Finalist	
2024	Shari Green	Song of Freedom, Song of Dreams	Finalist	
2024	June Hur	A Crane Among Wolves	Finalist	
2024	Kristy Jackson	Mortified	Finalist	
2025	Heather Smith	Tig	Winner	
2025	Deborah Ellis	The Outsmarters	Finalist	
2025	Kenneth Oppel	Best of All Worlds	Finalist	
2025	Léa Taranto	A Drop in the Ocean	Finalist	
2025	Richard Van Camp	Beast	Finalist	
2026	Kristy Jackson	Touching Grass	Winner	
2026	Philippa Dowding	The Love Song of Mr. Byrd	Finalist	
2026	Michelle Kadarusman	Seabird	Finalist	
2026	David A. Robertson	The World's End	Finalist	
2026	Jordyn Taylor	The Rebel Girls of Rome	Finalist	

== See also ==
- Governor General's Award for English-language young people's literature - illustrated books
- Governor General's Award for French-language young people's literature - text
- Governor General's Award for French-language young people's literature - illustrated books
