= Amy Mathers Teen Book Award =

Canadian literary award for first middle-grade novel

The Amy Mathers Teen Book Award is an annual Canadian literary award, administered by the Canadian Children's Book Centre, to recognize the best works of teen and young adult literature by Canadian writers.

The award is named for Amy Mathers, a Canadian woman with muscular dystrophy who undertook a reading "marathon" in 2014, reading one book a day for the entire year to raise funds to launch the award. Mathers died in 2026 at the age of 43.

== Winners and nominees ==
Award winners and finalists
Year	Author	Title	Result	Ref.
2015	Marthe Jocelyn	What We Hide	Winner	
2015	Laura Langston	The Art of Getting Stared At	Finalist	
2015	Caroline Pignat	The Gospel Truth	Finalist	
2015	Jeyn Roberts	The Bodies We Wear	Finalist	
2015	Robert Paul Weston	Blues for Zoey	Finalist	
2016	Susan Juby	The Truth Commission	Winner	
2016	Holly Bodger	5 to 1	Finalist	
2016	Erin Bow	Scorpion Rules	Finalist	
2016	Emil Sher	Young Man with Camera	Finalist	
2016	Stephanie Tromly	Trouble Is a Friend of Mine	Finalist	
2017	E. K. Johnston	Exit, Pursued by a Bear	Winner	
2017	Eileen Cook	With Malice	Finalist	
2017	Catherine Egan	Julia Vanishes	Finalist	
2017	M-E Girard	Girl Mans Up	Finalist	
2017	Caroline Pignat	Shooter	Finalist	
2018	Cherie Dimaline	The Marrow Thieves	Winner	
2018	Darren Groth	Munro vs. the Coyote	Finalist	
2018	Heather Smith	The Agony of Bun O'Keefe	Finalist	
2018	Allan Stratton	The Way Back Home	Finalist	
2018	Danielle Younge-Ullman	Everything Beautiful Is Not Ruined	Finalist	
2019	Michelle Barker	The House of One Thousand Eyes	Winner	
2019	Kelley Armstrong	Aftermath	Finalist	
2019	Tanaz Bhathena	A Girl Like That	Finalist	
2019	Catherine Lo	Easy Prey	Finalist	
2019	Janice Lynn Mather	Learning to Breathe	Finalist	
2020	Natasha Deen	In the Key of Nira Ghani	Winner	
2020	S. K. Ali	Love from A to Z	Finalist	
2020	Nafiza Azad	The Candle and the Flame	Finalist	
2020	L. D. Crichton	All Our Broken Pieces	Finalist	
2020	Tom Ryan	Keep This to Yourself	Finalist	
2021	Janice Lynn Mather	Facing the Sun	Winner	
2021	June Hur	The Silence of Bones	Finalist	
2021	Ben Philippe	Charming As a Verb	Finalist	
2021	Raziel Reid	Followers	Finalist	
2021	Danielle Younge-Ullman	He Must Like You	Finalist	
2022	Xiran Jay Zhao	Iron Widow	Winner	
2022	S. K. Ali	Misfit in Love	Finalist	
2022	Jasmin Kaur	If I Tell You the Truth	Finalist	
2022	Liselle Sambury	Blood Like Magic	Finalist	
2022	Courtney Summers	The Project	Finalist	
2023	Zoulfa Katouh	As Long as the Lemon Trees Grow	Winner	
2023	Nafiza Azad	The Road to Lost	Finalist	
2023	Jesmeen Kaur Deo	TJ Powar Has Something to Prove	Finalist	
2023	June Hur	The Red Palace	Finalist	
2023	H. N. Khan	Wrong Side of the Court	Finalist	
2024	Abdi Nazemian	Only This Beautiful Moment	Winner	
2024	Daniel Aleman	Brighter Than the Sun	Finalist	
2024	Jackie Khalilieh	Something More	Finalist	
2024	Liselle Sambury	Delicious Monsters	Finalist	
2024	Sarak Suk	The Space Between Here & Now	Finalist	
2025	Rosena Fung	Age 16	Winner	
2025	Kern Carter	And Then There Was Us	Finalist	
2025	Jen Ferguson	A Constellation of Minor Bears	Finalist	
2025	S.K. Ali	Fledgling	Finalist	
2025	Emily Varga	For She Is Wrath	Finalist	
2025	Vikki VanSickle, illus. by Laura K. Watson	The Lightning Circle	Finalist	
2026	Rachel Hartman	Among Ghosts	Finalist	
2026	Léa Taranto	A Drop in the Ocean	Finalist	
2026	Mackenzie Angeconeb	The Fragments that Remain	Finalist	
2026	Corey Liu	He’s So Possessed with Me	Finalist	
2026	Clara Kumagai	Songs for Ghosts	Finalist	
2026	Jackie Khalilieh	You Started It	Finalist	
