= Simmons College Center for the Study of Children's Literature =

The Center for the Study of Children's Literature is an academic program at Simmons University specializing in the critical, academic study of children's literature. The program was founded in 1977, and was the first program in the United States to offer a master's degree in the field.

Currently, the program offers an MA in Children's Literature, an MFA in Writing for Children, and two dual degrees (MA/MFA, and MA/MS in Library Services to Children). It also offers an Institute to the children's literature academic community in alternate summers. Guest speakers in previous years have included such notables as Louis Sachar, Maurice Sendak, Robert Cormier, Daniel Handler, and Lois Lowry. In 1986, a collection of speeches from the summer institute was published as Innocence and Experience: Essays and Conversations on Children's Literature, edited by Gregory Maguire and Barbara Harrison. The Lion and the Unicorn Poetry Award is presented at the institute.

The program is currently directed by Cathryn Mercier, a reviewer for the Horn Book Magazine and co-author, with Susan Bloom, of Presenting Avi (1997). Previous directors include Susan Bloom, Gregory Maguire, and Barbara Harrison.

== Notable alumni ==
- Gregory Maguire (MA 1978), author of Wicked
- Kit Pearson (MA 1981), best-selling Canadian author of The Sky is Falling, Awake and Dreaming among others
- Elena Abos (1999), Spanish translator of Holes, as well as the works of Diana Wynne Jones, Margaret Mahy, and Jack Gantos. Also writes articles for the Horn Book Magazine
- Susan Rich (2003), editor at HarperCollins who persuaded Daniel Handler to take on his Lemony Snicket pseudonym and write for children
- Kristin Cashore (MA 2003), author of Graceling
- Mackenzi Lee (MFA 2014), author of The Gentleman's Guide to Vice and Virtue
- Breanna J. McDaniel (MA 2014), author of the Coretta Scott King Illustration Award winning Go Forth and Tell: The Life of Augusta Baker, Librarian and Master Storyteller
- Gabe Cole Novoa (MFA 2019), New York Times bestselling author of speculative fiction featuring marginalized characters grappling with identity
- Sasha Lamb (MA/MS 2020), author of The Forbidden Book (Arthur A. Levine-Levine Querido, 2024), winner of the Sydney Taylor Book Award silver medal in the young adult category
- A number of judges for the Newbery Medal, the Caldecott Medal, and the Boston Globe-Horn Book Award

== Notable faculty ==
- Nancy Bond
- Anita Silvey
