= Five to One (disambiguation) =

"Five to One" is a 1968 song by the Doors.

Five to One or 5 to 1 may also refer to:

- Five to One (film), 1963
- 5 to 1, a 2015 novel by Holly Bodger
