= Bruce Hutchison =

Canadian writer and journalist (1901–1992)

William Bruce Hutchison
- Born: 5 June 1901; Prescott, Ontario, Canada
- Died: 14 September 1992 (aged 91)
- Occupations: author and journalist

William Bruce Hutchison, OC (5 June 1901– 14 September 1992) was a Canadian writer and journalist.

Born in Prescott, Ontario, Canada, Hutchison was educated in public schools in Victoria, British Columbia. He married Dorothy Kidd McDiarmid in 1925, around the same time that he began his journalism career as a political reporter in Ottawa. He was associate editor for The Winnipeg Free Press from 1944 to 1950. Hutchison was also editor of the Victoria Daily Times from 1950 to 1963, for which he had previously worked as a high-school journalist in approximately 1918. In 1963 Hutchison was made the editorial director of The Vancouver Sun. Hutchison would write for The Vancouver Sun until his death in 1992.

He travelled extensively throughout Canada during his career, and was present at the Imperial Conference of 1937. He was widely considered one of Canada's foremost experts on politics and was known in Washington, D.C., as well as Ottawa. He wrote frequently on current affairs and political issues, and also wrote short stories for The Saturday Evening Post, Collier's Weekly, Cosmopolitan, The American Magazine and Liberty.

Hutchison's first book, The Unknown Country, was published in 1942. Commissioned by a U.S. publisher with the intention of making America's new wartime ally better known to the American public, The Unknown Country was also published in Canada, and enjoyed favourable reviews on both sides of the border. It went on to win the 1942 Governor General's award for creative nonfiction.

In 1961, Hutchison was the first winner of the award from Distinguished Journalism in the Commonwealth, given by the Royal Society of Arts. In 1967 he was made an Officer of the Order of Canada.

The Jack Webster Foundation created the Bruce Hutchison Lifetime Achievement Award to recognize people making a lifetime of contribution to the field of journalism in British Columbia.

== Awards ==
- Bowater Prize - Details unknown, as reported in The Oxford Companion to Canadian Literature
- Bruce Hutchison Lifetime Achievement Award - The Jack Webster Foundation - 1991 - First recipient; continued in Hutchison's name
- City of Victoria Prize - 1990 - Details unknown, as reported in The Oxford Companion to Canadian Literature
- Governor General's Literary Award - 1942 - For The Unknown Country
- Governor General's Literary Award - 1952 - For The Incredible Canadian
- Governor General's Literary Award - 1957 - For Canada: Tomorrow's Giant
- Maclean's Honour Roll - 1989
- National Newspaper Award - Canadian Newspaper Association - Editorial Writing - 1952
- National Newspaper Award - Canadian Newspaper Association - Editorial Writing - 1957
- National Newspaper Award - Canadian Newspaper Association - Staff Corresponding - 1959
- Officer of the Order of Canada - Appointed 1967
- Royal Society of Arts Award for Distinguished Journalism in the Commonwealth - 1961

== Selected works ==
- The Unknown Country: Canada and her People - 1942 (winner of a Governor General's Award)
- The Hollow Men - 1944
- The Fraser - 1950
- The Incredible Canadian: A candid portrait of Mackenzie King, his works, his times, and his nation - 1952 (winner of a Governor General's Award)
- Canada's Lonely Neighbour - 1954
- The Struggle for the Border - 1955
- Canada: Tomorrow's Giant - 1957 (winner of a Governor General's Award)
- Mr. Prime Minister 1867–1964 - 1964
- Macdonald to Pearson: The prime ministers of Canada (Condensation of Mr. Prime Minister) - 1967
- Western Windows (Variant titles referenced; confirmed Western Windows in 1967 edition) - 1967
- Canada: A year of the land - 1967
- The Far Side of the Street - Autobiography - 1976
- Uncle Percy's Wonderful Town - 1981
- A Life in the Country - 1988
