= Donalda Dickie =

Canadian normal school teacher (1883–1972)

Donalda James Dickie (5 October 1883 — 15 December 1972) was a Canadian normal school teacher in Alberta from the 1910s to 1940s. During this time period, Dickie wrote textbooks and co-created a new syllabus for Albertan elementary schoolteachers. After ending her education career, Dickie continued to write textbooks in the 1950s. Of her works, Dickie wrote series on geography, history and literature. Her Canadian history book for schoolchildren, The Great Adventure, received the 1950 Governor General's Award for juvenile fiction.

== Early life and education ==
On 5 October 1883, Dickie was born in Hespeler, Ontario. During her childhood, Dickie lived in Souris, Manitoba and Moose Jaw, Saskatchewan. In the early 1900s, Dickie completed her teacher's training in Westview, Saskatchewan. For her post-secondary education, Dickie received a Master of Arts from Queen's University in 1910 and graduated from the University of Toronto in 1929 with a Doctor of Philosophy. Before entering Toronto, Dickie attended Somerville College, Oxford from the mid-1910s to mid 1920s and did not finish her Bachelor of Letters. In 1952, the University of Toronto gave Dickie an honorary degree.

== Career ==
From 1910 to the mid-1940s, Dickie alternated between Calgary, Edmonton and Camrose, Alberta as a normal school teacher. When in Edmonton, she often visited the home of Alexander Cameron Rutherford to visit with the family and write in his library. During her teaching career, Dickie began writing with a school textbook on poetry in 1920. As a textbook writer, Dickie wrote series on geography, history and literature for schoolchildren between the 1920s to 1930s. She created books for her students to provide "background for the political and constitutional history they were studying." During the mid-1930s, Dickie helped create a new syllabus for elementary schoolteachers in Alberta. In 1940, Dickie released a teachers manual on progressive education titled The Enterprise in Theory and Practice.

In 1944, Dickie briefly taught at Queen's University for a few months as a lecturer. After ending her educational career in 1945, Dickie continued to write textbooks. With roughly fifty-five textbooks by the early 1950s, Dickie covered social studies and English while primarily writing about history. During this decade, Dickie released a Canadian history book for middle schoolchildren titled The Great Adventure. With The Great Adventure, Dickie won the 1950 Governor General's Award for juvenile fiction.

During the early to mid 1950s, Dickie visited the Commonwealth realm to conduct research for a history textbook. Some countries she visited include India and South Africa. Apart from education, Dickie wrote children's books in the 1920s and 1930s. Some of her publications in this time period included All About Bears and Hearts High. At the end of writing career, Dickie had over sixty publications.

== Honours and death ==
During the late 1960s, the Donalda James Dickie Scholarship was given by the Alberta Teachers' Association. Dickie died in Haney, British Columbia on 15 December 1972.
