= Kit Pearson =

Canadian writer

Kit Pearson CM
- Born: April 30, 1947 (age 79); Edmonton, Alberta, Canada
- Occupation: Children's novelist
- Writing career
- Genre: Fiction
- Website: kitpearson.com

Kathleen Margaret "Kit" Pearson CM (born April 30, 1947) is a Canadian writer and winner of numerous literature awards. Pearson wrote the linked novels The Sky Is Falling (1989), Looking at the Moon (1991), and The Lights Go on Again (1993), published in 1999 as The Guests of War Trilogy, and Awake and Dreaming (1996), which won the 1997 Governor General's Award for English-language children's literature. She was appointed to the Order of Canada in 2019.

Pearson was born in Edmonton, Alberta and spent her childhood between that city and Vancouver, British Columbia. As a high-school student, she returned to Vancouver to be educated at Crofton House School. She obtained a degree in English Literature at the University of Alberta. In 1975, she began her Library degree at the University of British Columbia and took her first jobs in that field in Ontario. She later obtained an M.A. at the Simmons College Center for the Study of Children's Literature in Boston. Returning to Vancouver, she completed her first novel The Daring Game which was published by Penguin Books.

Pearson moved to Victoria, British Columbia, in 2005, where she lives with her partner Katherine Farris.

== Awards ==
- Governor General's Award for English-language children's literature for Awake and Dreaming
- Vicky Metcalf Award for a body of work
- Mr. Christie's Book Award, for The Sky is Falling
- The "Vlag en Wimpel" prize for the Dutch edition of The Sky is Falling.
- Canadian Library Association Children's Book of the Year Award, for A Handful of Time, The Sky is Falling and The Whole Truth
- Geoffrey Bilson Award for Historical Fiction, for The Sky is Falling and The Lights Go on Again
- Manitoba Young Readers' Choice Award, for Looking at the Moon and Awake and Dreaming.
- National I.O.D.E. Violet Downey Award for The Lights Go On Again.
- Ruth Schwartz Award, for Awake and Dreaming and The Whole Truth.
- Red Cedar Award, for Awake and Dreaming.
- Lieutenant Governor's Award for Literary Excellence
- Order of Canada

== Bibliography ==
- The Daring Game (1986)
- A Handful of Time (1987)
- The Sky is Falling (1989)
- The Singing Basket (1990)
- Looking at the Moon (1991)
- The Lights Go on Again (1993)
- Awake and Dreaming (1996)
- This Land (1998; editor)
- The Guests of War Trilogy (1999) (Compilation volume of The Sky is Falling, Looking at the Moon, and The Lights Go on Again)
- Whispers of War: The War of 1812 Diary of Susanna Merritt (2002) (Dear Canada series)
- A Perfect Gentle Knight (2007)
- The Whole Truth (2011)
- And Nothing But The Truth (2012)
- A Day of Signs and Wonders (2016)
- Be My Love (2019)
- The Magic Boat (with Katherine Farris, illustrated by Gabrielle Grimard) (2019)
