= Click (novel) =

2007 collaborative fiction work

- First edition cover
- Author: David Almond; Eoin Colfer; Roddy Doyle; Deborah Ellis; Nick Hornby; Margo Lanagan; Gregory Maguire; Ruth Ozeki; Linda Sue Park; Tim Wynne-Jones
- Cover artist: Phil Falco
- Genre: Juvenile fiction, collaborative fiction
- Publisher: Arthur A. Levine Books
- Publication date: 1 October 2007
- Media type: Print (Hardcover)
- Pages: 217 pp
- ISBN: 978-0-439-41138-7
- OCLC: 80456873

Click (2007) is a work of collaborative fiction written by David Almond, Eoin Colfer, Roddy Doyle, Deborah Ellis, Nick Hornby, Margo Lanagan, Gregory Maguire, Ruth Ozeki, Linda Sue Park, and Tim Wynne-Jones. It is about a photographer named George G. Keane, his grandchildren, Jason and Margaret, and how they affected the lives of different people, such as a Russian prisoner and an Irish teen.

== Plot ==
George G. Keane, or "Gee", was a photographer who travelled around the world taking pictures. In his will, Gee leaves his granddaughter, Margaret, a box containing seven lettered boxes and a message stating "throw them all back". Each lettered box contains a shell. She discovers that each letter on each box represents the continent that the shell came from, and that her grandfather intended for her to put them back where they came from over her lifetime. This is a gift that will last Maggie's whole life. Meanwhile, Jason, Margaret's brother, is left with a camera and uses it to construct multiple photo albums, one of which consisted of a girl doing ordinary things throughout the day while holding a large piece of glass. The last chapter of the book depicts an elderly Margaret living in the future with her great-niece, watching a documentary about her grandfather, her brother, and herself.

== Reception ==
The novel was well received by the online community, most notably in an article by NPR.

== Characters ==
- Jason
- Mom
- Dad
- Maggie
- Gee
- Frank
- Gina
- Lev
- Annie
- Vincent (Vinnie)
- Francis (Frankie)
- Jiro
- Taro
- Emily
- Afela
- Sam (Afela's cousin)
- Mack (Sam's dog)
- Jasmine (Min)
- Brendan
