= Michelle Barker =

Canadian author

- Born: 1964 (age 61–62); Vancouver
- Education: MFA in Creative Writing, University of British Columbia
- Occupations: Author, editor, educator
- Writing career
- Language: English
- Notable work: The House of One Thousand Eyes
- Notable awards: Amy Mathers Teen Book Award (2019)

Michelle Barker (born 1964) is a Canadian author, poet, editor, and educator. She writes for young adults, children, and adults, across historical fiction, fantasy, picture books, poetry, and non-fiction. She is a senior editor with the editing collective Darling Axe.

== Early life and education ==
Barker earned an MFA in Creative Writing from the University of British Columbia.

== Career ==
=== Literary work ===
Barker's young adult novel The House of One Thousand Eyes (2018, Annick Press) was named a Kirkus Best Book of 2018. She followed with My Long List of Impossible Things (2020, Annick Press) and the picture book A Year of Borrowed Men (2015, Pajama Press), which was a finalist for the TD Canadian Children's Literature Award. Her earlier works include The Beggar King (2013, Thistledown Press) and the poetry chapbook Old Growth, Clear-Cut: Poems of Haida Gwaii (2012, Leaf Press).

=== Reception and awards ===
Barker won the Amy Mathers Teen Book Award in 2019 for The House of One Thousand Eyes.

The House of One Thousand Eyes received starred reviews from Kirkus Reviews and School Library Journal. It was also named to Kirkus Reviews' list of Best Young Adult Books of 2018.

A Year of Borrowed Men drew praise from Quill & Quire for its portrayal of wartime life through a child's perspective, and was a finalist for the 2016 TD Canadian Children's Literature Award.

== Other roles ==
Barker works as a senior editor with the Darling Axe and contributes poetry, short fiction, and non-fiction to literary journals internationally.

== Personal life ==
She lives in Vancouver, Canada, and participates in triathlons when not writing.

== Works ==
Title	Year	Publisher	Genre
Old Growth, Clear-Cut: Poems of Haida Gwaii	2012	Leaf Press	Poetry / Chapbook
The Beggar King	2013	Thistledown Press	Fantasy
A Year of Borrowed Men	2015	Pajama Press	Picture book / Historical fiction
The House of One Thousand Eyes	2018	Annick Press	Young adult / Historical fiction
My Long List of Impossible Things	2020	Annick Press	Young adult / Historical fiction
