= Edward Goff Penny =

Canadian politician

The Honourable Edward Goff Penny

Senator for Alma, Quebec
- In office March 13, 1874 – October 11, 1881
- Appointed by: Alexander Mackenzie
- Preceded by: James Leslie
- Succeeded by: Alexander Walker Ogilvie

Personal details
- Born: 15 May 1820 Islington (now part of London), England
- Died: October 11, 1881 (aged 61) Montreal, Quebec
- Party: Liberal
- Occupation: Author, newspaper owner

Edward Goff Penny (15 May 1820 – 11 October 1881) was an English-Canadian journalist, businessman, and politician.

Born in Islington (now part of London), England, Penny moved to Canada in 1844, settling in Montreal, Quebec and joined the Montreal Herald as a reporter. At the same time he studied law and in 1850 was admitted to the Lower Canadian bar, though he never practised law as a profession. Penny would become editor-in-chief and a co-owner of the newspaper, taking it to "its height of success". He was the first president of the Parliamentary Press Gallery in Ottawa.

In 1874, he was the first newspaper reporter appointed to the Senate of Canada representing the senatorial division of Alma, Quebec. He died in office in 1881.

Arthur G. Penny, the grandson of Edward Goff Penny, died in 1963. His will endowed the Edward Goff Penny Memorial Prizes, in memory of his grandfather. The first prizes were awarded in 1991. The awards are administered by the Canadian Newspaper Association. There are two prizes of $1500 for young journalists between the ages 20 and 25. One is given for newspapers with less than 25,000 circulation; the other is for newspapers with more than 25,000 circulation.
