= Janet Lunn =

Canadian children's writer

Janet Louise Lunn
- Born: Janet Louise Swoboda; December 28, 1928; Dallas, Texas, U.S.
- Died: June 26, 2017 (aged 88); Ottawa, Ontario, Canada
- Citizenship: Canada (from 1963)
- Occupation: Writer
- Writing career
- Genres: Children's literature, fantasy
- Notable awards: Order of Canada; Order of Ontario

Janet Louise Lunn, CM OOnt (née Swoboda; December 28, 1928 – June 26, 2017) was a Canadian children's writer.

== Early life and education ==
Lunn was born in Dallas, Texas; she moved with her family to Vermont when she was an infant. In 1938, she moved again to the outskirts of New York City. In 1946, she came to Canada to attend Queen's University and married a fellow student, Richard Lunn. She became a Canadian citizen in 1963. They had five children and her husband died in 1987.

== Career ==
Janet Lunn published her first children's book, Double Spell, in 1968. From 1972 to 1975, she was a children's editor for Clark, Irwin Publishers.

From 1984 to 1985, she was the first children's author to be Chair of the Writers' Union of Canada.

In 1982, she was awarded the Vicky Metcalf Award. She was awarded the Order of Ontario in 1996 and made a Member of the Order of Canada in 1997. She died on June 26, 2017, at age 88.

== Selected works ==
- Double Spell (1968) Twin Spell (U.S. 1969)
- The Root Cellar (1981)
- Shadow in Hawthorn Bay (1986)
- The Hollow Tree (1997), winner of the 1998 Governor General's Award for English-language children's literature
- A Rebel's Daughter: The 1837 Rebellion Diary of Arabella Stevenson, Toronto, Upper Canada, 1837 (2006) - part of the Dear Canada series
- A Season for Miracles: Twelve Tales of Christmas (various authors) (2006) - part of the Dear Canada series
- The Story of Canada with Christopher Moore and Alan Daniel
