= The Root Cellar =

1981 children's historical novel by Janet Lunn

- First edition
- Author: Janet Lunn
- Language: English
- Genre: Children's historical fiction novel
- Publisher: Lester and Orpen Dennys
- Publication date: 1981
- Publication place: Canada
- Media type: Print (Paperback)
- Pages: 247 pp (first edition, paperback)
- ISBN: 0-919630-78-2
- OCLC: 8982625
- Followed by: Shadow in Hawthorn Bay

The Root Cellar is a children's historical novel by Janet Lunn that is set in the 1980s, although much of the action takes place in the 1860s. It follows Rose Larkin, an orphan, who travels temporally back and forth between Ontario, Canada, of the 1980s and various settings of U.S. Civil War in the 1860s. This time travel is done through the root cellar of the title.

== Plot ==
Twelve-year-old Rose Larkin is an orphan whose parents died when she was only three years old. Following their death, Rose lived with her grandmother. Following the death of her grandmother, Rose is sent to live with relatives in Ontario, Canada. After much misunderstanding between herself and her cousins, she flees and there finds a root cellar. After descending into the root cellar, she is then shifted to the 1860s.

Rose meets Susan and Will, who lived on the farm at that time. Susan works for the Morrissay family but is very close to Will. Rose soon discovers that every time she goes back to the past, Will and Susan age more rapidly than herself. Eventually, Rose goes back and learns that Will has run off to join the Union Army. Rose convinces Susan they must find Will, who by then missing in action. The girls travel from Ontario to New York and Washington, D.C. to find him. At the end on their adventure, Rose is faced with the destruction of the root cellar by a storm in the 1980s, which keeps her from returning to Will and Susan’s time.

== Setting ==
The novel takes place in three major locations. It starts on a farm located in Ontario, Canada in 80s. After Rose enters the root cellar, she ends up in Canada during the 1860s. Rose and Susan soon travel to New York City and Washington D.C to find their friend, Will.

== Characters ==
- Rose Larkin

A twelve year old girl who bounces from relative to relative after the death of her grandmother. She ends up living with her aunt and uncle, along with her cousins, near Lake Ontario in Canada. Rose has a hard time fitting in with them, and in her solitary life there, stumbles upon the root cellar and finds herself in the early 1860s. She finally makes friends with Susan Anderson and Will Morrissay, who at this time are very close in age to her.

- Susan Anderson

A hired girl who lives in Canada during the 1860s and works on the Morrissay's farm. She meets Rose after Rose travels to the past through the root cellar. The two girls form a friendship after Rose’s first visit. While Rose ages relative to the present, Susan ages at a much faster rate, each time Rose travels between her time and Susan’s. However, after an experiment of exchanging something precious to each girl, they find the present time and Susan’s time became in sync. After Will joins the U.S. army and goes MIA, Rose insists they must find him.

- Will Morrissay

A boy from the Morrissay family, for whom Susan works for. Will joins the Union army during the American Civil War. After he goes MIA, Rose and Susan leave Hawthorn Bay in Canada and travel through the United States to find him.

== Reception ==
It won the 1982 Canada Library Association Book of the Year for Children Award. In 1988 the book won the California Young Reader Medal The book was well received by readers, earning 4 out of 5 stars on Amazon and 3.91 out of 5 stars on Goodreads

"Melds past and present neatly...suspenseful." -- Publishers Weekly

== See also ==
- American Civil War
- The Hollow Tree
