= 1953 Governor General's Awards =

Canadian literary award

In Canada, the 1953 Governor General's Awards for Literary Merit were the seventeenth such awards. The awards in this period had no monetary prize but were an honour for the authors.

== Winners ==
- Fiction: David Walker, Digby.
- Poetry or Drama: Douglas LePan, The Net and the Sword.
- Non-Fiction: N.J. Berrill, Sex and the Nature of Things.
- Non-Fiction: J.M.S. Careless, Canada, A Story of Challenge.
- Juvenile: John F. Hayes, Rebels Ride at Night.
