= 1954 Governor General's Awards =

Canadian literary award

In Canada, the 1954 Governor General's Awards for Literary Merit were the eighteenth such awards. The awards in this period had no monetary prize but were an honour for the authors.

== Winners ==
- Fiction: Igor Gouzenko, The Fall of a Titan.
- Poetry or Drama: P. K. Page, The Metal and the Flower.
- Non-Fiction: Hugh MacLennan, Thirty and Three.
- Non-Fiction: A.R.M. Lower, The Most Famous Stream.
- Juvenile: Marjorie Wilkins Campbell, The Nor'westers.
