= News Media Canada =

Canadian trade association

- Médias d'info Canada
- Abbreviation: NMC, MIC
- Established: 2016; 10 years ago
- Merger of: Canadian Newspaper Association; Canadian Community Newspapers Association
- Website: nmc-mic.ca
- Formerly called: Newspapers Canada

News Media Canada (NMC), formerly Newspapers Canada, is a trade association for newspaper publishers in Canada. It was established in 2016 through the merger of the Canadian Newspaper Association and the Canadian Community Newspapers Association.

NMC represents over 830 daily, weekly and community newspapers in every province and territory in Canada.

== History ==
A February 2017 Canadian Press article reported the organization's name as having been changed to News Media Canada.

On 22 May 2019, NMC was named as one of eight "Canadian organizations that will sit on a special advisory panel tasked with recommending news operations for participation in a $600 million" media bailout fund scheduled to last five years. The announcement was made by then-Finance Minister Bill Morneau.

Heritage Minister Pablo Rodriguez said that under the program, the media would be eligible for refundable tax credits, a non-refundable tax credit for subscriptions to Canadian digital news and access to charitable tax incentives for not-for-profit journalism. The CBC two days later published an op-ed by former Ottawa Citizen editor Andrew Potter who called the "Liberals' bailout package... a toxic initiative." Among other points, he identified the NMC as "a newspaper industry lobby group" who had begged the government for three years.
