= Martha Brooks =

Canadian writer of plays, novels, and short fiction

- Born: Martha Ruth Brooks; July 15, 1944 (age 82); Ninette, Manitoba, Canada
- Occupation: Writer

Martha Ruth Brooks (born July 15, 1944) is a Canadian writer of plays, novels, and short fiction. Her young adult novel True Confessions of a Heartless Girl won the Governor General's Award for English language children's literature in 2002.

Winnipeg-based Brooks was born and raised on the grounds of the Manitoba Sanatorium in Ninette, Manitoba, where her father was a thoracic surgeon and her mother a nurse.

Brooks is also a jazz singer and her album Change of Heart won the Prairie Music Award for outstanding jazz album in 2002.

Her books have received numerous awards including the Governor General's Award, the Vicky Metcalf Award, Mr. Christie Book Award, the Ruth Schwartz Award, the Canadian Library Association Young Adult Book Award, and the McNally Robinson Book for Young People Award.

== Works ==
- Paradise Cafe and other stories, 1988.
- Two Moons in August, 1991
- Travelling on into the Light and Other Stories, 1994
- I Met a Bully on the Hill, 1995
- Andrew's Tree, 1996
- Bone Dance, 1997
- Being with Henry, 1999
- True Confessions of a Heartless Girl, 2002
- Mistik Lake, 2007
- Queen of Hearts, 2010
