= 1957 Governor General's Awards =

Canadian literary award

The 1957 Governor General's Awards for Literary Merit were the twenty-first such awards in Canada. The awards in this period an honour for the authors but had no monetary prize.

== Winners ==
- Fiction: Gabrielle Roy, Street of Riches.
- Poetry or Drama: Jay Macpherson, The Boatman.
- Non-Fiction: Bruce Hutchison, Canada: Tomorrow's Giant.
- Non-Fiction: Thomas H. Raddall, The Path of Destiny.
- Juvenile: Kerry Wood, The Great Chief.
