= Morgan Nyberg =

Canadian writer and educator

Everett Wayne Morgan Nyberg (born 16 March 1944) is a Canadian writer and English as a Second Language teacher. Nyberg began his education career in British Columbia in 1978. He taught high school in Quito, Ecuador from 1984 to 1986. In 1988, Nyberg left Canada to teach in Aveiro, Portugal and later in the Sultanate of Oman. Outside of education, Nyberg wrote poetry in the 1970s before turning to fiction in 1980. His first novel, Galahad Schwartz and the Cockroach Army won the 1987 Governor General's Award for English-language children's literature.

== Early life and education ==
On 16 March 1944, Nyberg was born in Thunder Bay, Ontario. He grew up in southern British Columbia. For his post-secondary education, he initially went to the University of British Columbia, where he earned a Bachelor of Arts degree in 1966. He later returned to UBC in the late 1970s and became a certified teacher. In 2004 he was awarded a Postgraduate Diploma in English Linguistics from the University of Central England, Birmingham.

== Career ==
Nyberg began his education career as a creative writing instructor at Douglas College from 1974 to 1975. From 1975 to 1978 he worked at various labor jobs. He worked as a secondary school substitute teacher in Vancouver between 1978 and 1982. Nyberg went on to teach English as a Second Language at Vancouver Community College from 1982 to 1984 before leaving for Quito, Ecuador. There he taught high school English at Colegio Americano. From 1988 to 1998 Nyberg taught at the University of Aveiro, Portugal. In 1998 he moved to the Sultanate of Oman to teach English as a Foreign Language at Sultan Qaboos University in Muscat. He remained there until his retirement in 2010, when he returned to British Columbia to live.

Outside of education, Nyberg released a book of poetry titled The Crazy Horse Suite, a collection of poems for four voices, in 1978, before switching to fiction in 1980. The Crazy Horse Suite was broadcast as an hour-long production on CBC Radio's Hornby Collection in 1982. He continued writing while in Quito during the mid-1980s. Galahad Schwartz and the Cockroach Army was published in 1987, winning the Governor General's Award for English-language children's literature for that year. Nyberg published again in 1998 with the adult novel El Dorado Shuffle before publishing another children's book, Bad Day in Gladland in 2011. Throughout the 2010s, Nyberg continued writing adult fiction with Mr. Millennium in 2011 and a post-apocalyptic fiction series set in British Columbia, The Raincoast Saga.
