= Myra Paperny =

Canadian author and former academic (born 1932)

Myra Paperny (née Green born 19 September 1932) is a Canadian author and former academic. After briefly reporting for the Vancouver Province and Vancouver News Herald in the early 1950s, Paperny taught creative writing at Mount Royal College and the University of Calgary between the mid 1950s and mid 1970s. Upon leaving academics, Paperny wrote multiple books between the 1970s to 2000s. Of her works, The Wooden People won the 1975 Little, Brown Children’s Book Award and the 1976 Canada Council Children's Literature Prize in the English language category.

== Early life and education ==
On 19 September 1932, Paperny was born in Edmonton, Alberta. Growing up, Paperny lived in Ponoka, Alberta as a child and British Columbia as a teenager. For her post-secondary education, Paperny received a Bachelor of Arts from the University of British Columbia in 1953. The following year, Paperny earned a Master of Science from Columbia University and specialized in journalism.

== Career ==
While attending university, Paperny began her career as a newspaper reporter with the Vancouver Province in 1952 and the Vancouver News Herald in 1953. Following her journalism career, Green worked for CBC Radio as a freelancer before going into academics. Paperny taught creative writing at Mount Royal College in 1965 before leaving for the University of Calgary in 1966. She ended her creative writing academic position at Calgary in 1975 and started working in public relations.

Outside of academics, Paperny edited Councilwoman from 1970 to 1973 before she published The Wooden People in 1976. Paperny did not write another children's book until the late 1980s with Take a Giant Step in 1987 and Nightmare Mountain in 1988. Her completed fourth book, The Greenies, was published in 2005.

== Writing style and themes ==
For the majority of her first works, Paperny used her and her family's recollections while incorporating detailed research on Alberta. To write The Wooden People, Peperny used mail-order catalogs by Eaton's and had the story take place years before the Great Depression. After the release of The Wooden People, Paperny said there was no connection between the similarities of her youth and her book. With The Greenies, Paperny intended to set her story in British Columbia after World War II. She instead decided to write about Jewish children who moved to Canada after World War II as orphans.

== Awards and honors ==
In 1975, Paperny won the 1975 Little, Brown Children’s Book Award for The Wooden People as an unpublished work. Following publication, Paperny was awarded the 1976 Canada Council Children's Literature Prize in the English language category.

== Personal life ==
Paperny is married and has four children.
