= Edith L. Sharp =

Canadian writer and educator (1911–1974)

- Born: Edith Lambert Sharp; March 7, 1911 near Carroll, Manitoba
- Died: July 2, 1974 (aged 63); Surrey, British Columbia
- Occupations: Writing teacher, writer
- Writing career
- Genre: Children's literature

Edith Lambert Sharp (March 7, 1911 – July 2, 1974) was a Canadian professional woman, writing teacher, and writer. She won the annual Governor General's Award for juvenile fiction in 1958, recognizing her historical novel Nkwala as the year's best Canadian book.

== Life ==
She was born near Carroll, Manitoba, the daughter of Charles Lambert and Edna Louise (Maloan) Sharp. She dropped out of high school in Penticton, British Columbia, after one year. She attended the Vancouver School of Art and took private studies from the Smithsonian Institution to develop her artistic talents.

Sharp worked as the director of the Okanagan Summer School of the Arts, and taught creative writing in night and summer schools. She also became involved in politics and served for several years as secretary to the riding associations of the local Progressive Conservative Party.

Sharp was a member of the Penticton Board of Trade, an honorary member of the Business and Professional Women's Club, and a member of the Conservative Party and the Anglican Church of Canada. She died in British Columbia in 1974.

== Selected works ==
- Nkwala, illustrated by William Winter (Little, Brown, 1958), OCLC 964680, LCCN 58-8492 – Governor General's Award for Juvenile Fiction

Nkwala is a researched juvenile novel about the pre-colonial Okanagan people of the Interior of British Columbia.
