= Martine Leavitt =

American novelist (born 1953)

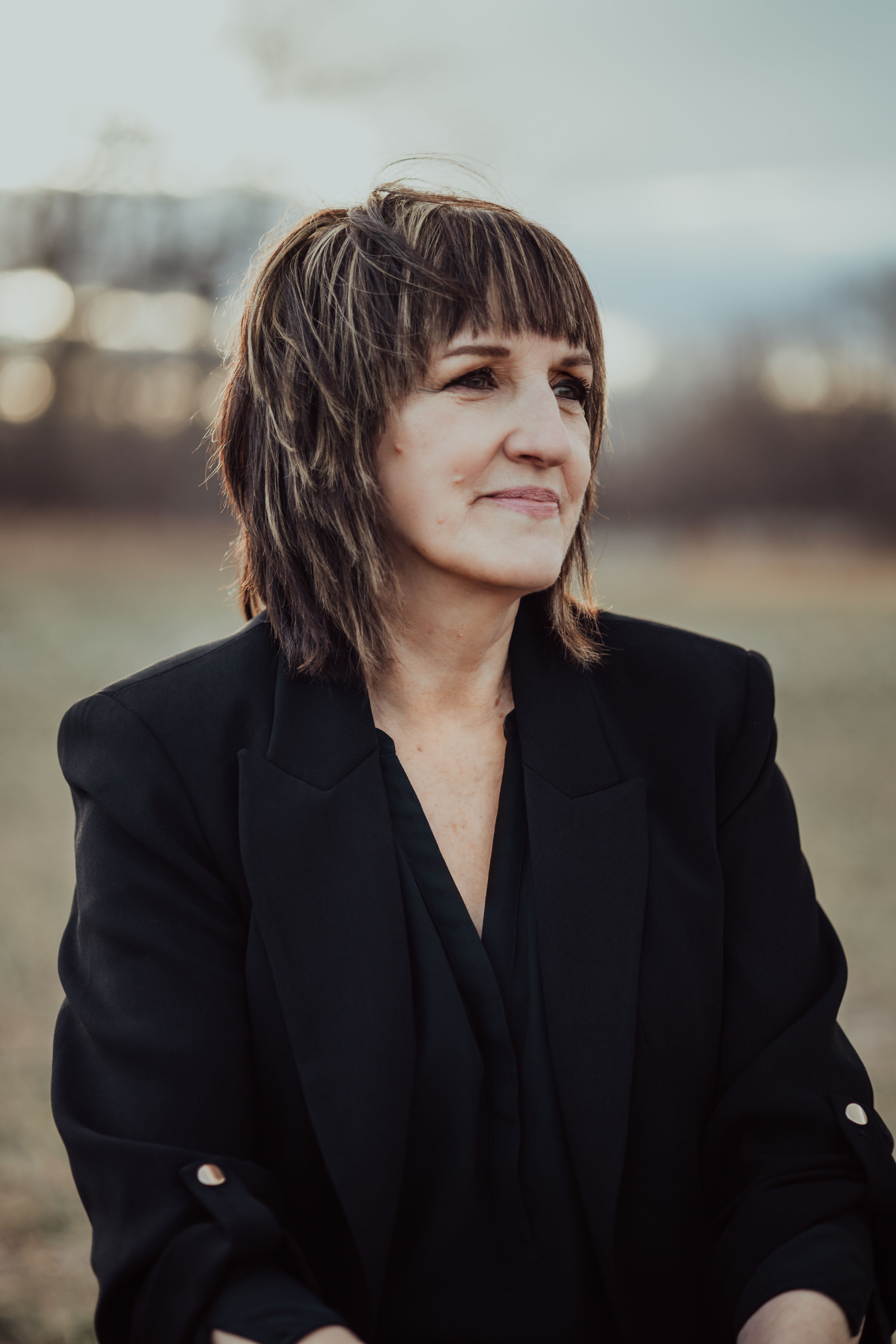
- Leavitt in 2022
- Born: 1953 (age 72–73); Taber, Alberta, Canada
- Education: University of Calgary (BA); Vermont College of Fine Arts (MFA)
- Occupations: Novelist; writing instructor
- Writing career
- Period: 1992 – present
- Genre: Young adult literature
- Website: martineleavitt.com

Martine Leavitt (born 1953) is a Canadian-American writer of young adult novels and a creative writing instructor.

== Biography ==
Leavitt was born in 1953 in Taber, Alberta. She received a Bachelor of Arts degree from the University of Calgary and a Master of Fine Arts from Vermont College. She lives with her husband in High River, Alberta.

Martine Leavitt writes novels for young adults. Heck Superhero (2004) was a Kirkus Reviews Editor's Choice and ALA Best Books for Young Adults selection. The Dollmage (2006) was also an ALA Best Book for Young Adults selection. Keturah and Lord Death (2006) was a finalist for the National Book Award for Young People's Literature, a Junior Library Guild Premier Selection, a Booklist Editors' Choice, one of Chicago Public Library's Best of the Best Books, and a New York Public Library Book for the Teen Age selection. My Book of Life by Angel (2012) was a finalist for the Los Angeles Times Book Prize and won the Canadian Library Association Young Adult Book Award. It was also a Horn Book Fanfare book, a Cooperative Children's Book Center (CCBC) Choice, a Booklist Best Book of the Year, and a Junior Library Guild selection. Calvin (2015) won the 2016 Governor General's Award for English-language young people's literature - text.

She taught creative writing at Vermont College of Fine Arts, a short-residency MFA program, where she served as the Katherine Paterson Endowed Chair from 2022 to 2023.

== Selected works ==
=== Novels ===
- The Dragon's Tapestry (1992)
- Prism Moon (1993)
- The Taker's Key (1998)
- The Dollmage (2001)
- Tom Finder (2003)
- Heck Superhero (2004)
- Keturah and Lord Death (2006)
- My Book of Life by Angel (2012)
- Blue Mountain (2014)
- Calvin (2015)
- Buffalo Flats (2023)
- Whenever You Are (2026)

== Awards ==
Year	Title	Award	Category	Result	Ref.
1993	The Dragon's Tapestry	AML Award	Young Adult Literature	Winner	
1998	The Taker's Key	AML Award	Young Adult Literature	Winner	
2003	Tom Finder	Mr. Christie's Book Award	12 and up	Winner	
2004	Tom Finder	IBPA Benjamin Franklin Award	—	Winner	
2004	Heck Superhero	Governor General's Award	English-language children's literature	Shortlisted	
2008	Heck Superhero	Premio Paolo Ungari/UNICEF	—	Finalist	
2006	Keturah and Lord Death	Foreword INDIES Book of the Year Award	Young Adult Fiction (Children's)	Bronze Winner	
2006	Keturah and Lord Death	National Book Award	Young People's Literature	Finalist	
2008	Keturah and Lord Death	Forest of Reading Awards	White Pine Award	Winner	
2008	Keturah and Lord Death	The Bulletin of the Center for Children's Books Blue Ribbon	—	Winner	
2012	My Book of Life by Angel	Los Angeles Times Book Prize	Young Adult Novel	Finalist	
2013	My Book of Life by Angel	Canadian Library Association Young Adult Book Award	—	Winner	
2015	Calvin	Whitney Award	General Youth Fiction	Winner	
2016	Calvin	Governor General's Award	English-language young people's literature - text	Winner	
