= The Heaven Shop =

2004 novel by Deborah Ellis

- First edition
- Author: Deborah Ellis
- Language: English
- Genre: Novel
- Publisher: Fitzhenry and Whiteside
- Publication date: 2004
- Publication place: Canada
- Media type: Print (Paperback)
- ISBN: 1-55041-908-0
- OCLC: 54906883

The Heaven Shop is a novel written by Canadian author Deborah Ellis. The story is set in Malawi and deals with HIV/AIDS orphans. The novel was written to dispel myths about HIV/AIDS and celebrate the courage of child sufferers in Malawi. It was published by Fitzhenry and Whiteside in 2004.

Royalties were donated to UNICEF.

== Plot ==
The plot centers around 13-year-old Binti, a girl from Malawi. Binti's mother had died from AIDS about 6 years before. Her father owns a coffin shop called The Heaven Shop. Binti is a star on a radio show called "Gogo's Family" and helps support the family with the money she earns through the show.

Binti's father Bambo, infected with AIDS, contracts pneumonia due to his suppressed immune system and dies. Binti and her siblings are placed in the care of her less wealthy relatives, who take their belongings and force them to move to their homes, where they are treated poorly. Binti steals back money that her relatives stole from her and decides to run away. She boards a bus to her grandmother, Gogo. When she arrives, she becomes lost and goes to a church to ask a priest whether anyone knows who or where her grandma is. The priest then asks the audience, and a man named Jeremiah says he knows her. He drops her off there. Binti is disappointed to find that her grandmother sleeps outside, with over 20 other children. At her grandmother's place, she has to work with a mother who is the same age as her, named Memory. She finds out Memory is HIV-positive as is her daughter. She tries to make a coffin when a man spots her. He asks her to build him a coffin, and in return helps her fix her roof. Afterwards, they successfully restart Binti's father's coffin business. They name it after Bambo's shop, where they continue to make coffins. When Binti's grandmother dies, they build her a coffin. Binti's sibling Junie was with her, but parted to find a better way to make money and worked as a prostitute. She contracts HIV from one of them. Kwasi is arrested for theft, but her grandmother was able to bring him back to their home.
