= Diana Wieler =

Canadian writer of children's books

Diana Wieler (born October 14, 1961) is a Canadian writer of children's books.

The daughter of Jean Florence Zebrasky and Heinz Egon Petrich, she was born in Winnipeg, Manitoba and was educated there and in Calgary, Alberta. She attended the Southern Alberta Institute of Technology, taking a program in media arts. She worked in radio in Calgary and then for a newspaper in Saskatoon, Saskatchewan. She returned to Winnipeg where she now lives.

She married Larry Wieler; the couple has one son.

== Selected books ==
- Last Chance Summer (1986)
- Bad Boy (1991), received the Governor General's Award for English-language children's literature and the Canadian Library Association Young Adult Book Award
- RanVan the Defender (1993), received a Mr. Christie's Book Award
- RanVan: A Worthy Opponent (1995), was a finalist for a Governor General's Award
- To the Mountains By Morning (1995)
