= Calvin (novel) =

2015 novel by Martine Leavitt

- Author: Martine Leavitt
- Language: English
- Genre: Coming of age
- Set in: Ontario, Canada; Lake Erie
- Publisher: Groundwood Books (Canada); Farrar Straus Giroux (United States)
- Publication date: November 6, 2015 (Canada); November 17, 2015 (United States)
- Pages: 184
- Awards: Governor General's Award for English-language children's literature
- ISBN: 978-0-374-38073-1

Calvin is a 2015 young adult novel by Martine Leavitt published by Groundwood Books. Written in the form of a letter from Calvin (a seventeen-year-old boy) to Bill Watterson, founder of the Calvin and Hobbes comic strip, the book follows protagonist Calvin as he is hospitalized and diagnosed with schizophrenia. As a part of his illness, he hallucinates Hobbes, a tiger from the comic.

Believing he must convince Watterson to write one last comic strip of Calvin and Hobbes with Calvin (the comic strip character) as a healthy boy to cure him of his disorder, he escapes the hospital with his crush and former friend Susie McClean, whom Calvin is possibly hallucinating. Calvin, Susie and Hobbes journey from Ontario, Canada, across frozen Lake Erie in hopes of visiting Watterson's home in Cleveland, Ohio, in the United States. Susie and Calvin are eventually rescued by paramedics, with the imagined Hobbes being left behind on the lake.

The novel received mostly positive reviews upon release, with critics praising its dialogue and irreverent but sensitive treatment of its subject, though a review in The Bulletin of the Center for Children's Books found it to have an unlikely premise. Calvin won the 2016 Governor General's Award for English-language children's literature, an award presented by the Canada Council to promote Canadian literature. The book was not approved, licensed, or endorsed by Watterson.

== Synopsis ==
The novel is written in the form of a letter typed from Calvin, a seventeen-year-old boy, to Bill Watterson, creator of the Calvin and Hobbes comic strip. Calvin writes to Watterson, referred to as "Bill" in the letter, for an English class project. In the letter, Calvin recounts seeing his room "swelling and shrinking" and hallucinating Hobbes, a tiger. As a child, he owned a Hobbes plush, though it fell apart when his mother washed it. In English class as a seventeen-year-old, Calvin goes through various hallucinations and is hospitalized.

Diagnosed with schizophrenia, he reasons that he will be cured of his disorder if he can convince Watterson to write one last strip depicting Calvin as a healthy boy. He comes to this conclusion because of his name, because he was born on the last day the Calvin and Hobbes strip was published, because he had a Hobbes plush growing up, and because his first grade teacher's name was "Miss Wood" (compared to Miss Wormwood in the comics). He sends a letter to the editor to The Plain Dealer, Watterson's local paper, describing his plan, and an email to him in care of his publisher, Andrews McMeel Universal.

Calvin's crush and former friend Susie McLean visits him in the hospital, and he describes his plan to hike from Leamington, Ontario, across frozen Lake Erie to Watterson's home in Cleveland, Ohio, in the United States, to her. Susie agrees to go with. They escape from the hospital, buy hiking gear, travel by taxi to Point Pelee National Park, and begin their journey. On the first day, they encounter an ice fishing village and meet a fisherman, Orvil Watts, who threatens to call the authorities and ultimately gives them tips on ice hiking and warns them of monsters, including Jenny Greenteeth.

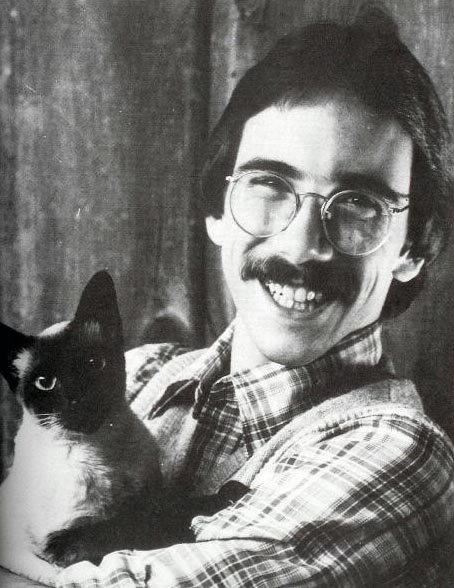
Bill Watterson (pictured in 1980) plays a prominent role in the plot of Calvin.

The trip is slow-going. Susie says to Calvin, "I got the idea long ago that you were one of the things my life was about". The two discuss the meaning of life. Approaching abandoned cars on the ice, they take a short joyride in an old Ford Mustang. Setting up a tent, Calvin and Susie see smoke coming from a cabin on a reef, and go there. At the cabin, a man, Noah, says Calvin should be responsible for the girl (Susie) on the lake. He ultimately lets them in.

Noah, a poet, tells Susie his wife is divorcing him, but she would take him back if he "figured it out". He ignores Calvin, but tells Susie that he once met Bill in his cabin when Watterson and a mutual friend came to ice fish. Susie calls Calvin her boyfriend to Noah, who figures out he must stop "looking for metaphors and look at [his wife]" to understand her deeply. Noah leaves the cabin in the night, and Calvin and Susie leave the next day.

Susie asks how much further they have to go to reach the United States, but Calvin will not tell her, which worries her. Calvin and Susie start to set up a tent as night approaches and, hallucinating that Hobbes may eat Susie due to his hunger and thirst, Calvin pours a bottle of water (half their supply) and some raisins onto the ice. Susie tells Calvin that he loves her, and always has. Calvin kisses Susie.

While walking the next day, Susie and Calvin discuss their beliefs about God, Russell's teapot, the philosophy of war, and income inequality. Susie begins to cry, but later sees lights in the distance and starts to shiver. Calvin sees Jenny Greenteeth appear out of the ice; she tells him Susie is dying. Hobbes attacks the monster, who, according to Calvin, yowls, but according to Susie, the sound is ice screaming.

Susie collapses on the ice, and Calvin sits beside her and kisses her as she mumbles. Susie hears a helicopter, which hovers over them as the ice cracks. Paramedics in the helicopter pick up Susie first, and Hobbes asks to be left in the lake; in the aircraft, Susie says Calvin will owe her for the rest of his life, and asks that he take his medications. Susie makes Calvin return to school. He takes his medication and experiences no side effects. Calvin thanks Bill, and speculates that he might have been the one to call emergency services for them.

== Origin ==
Having written three novels about homelessness, Martine Leavitt realized that the protagonists of those novels had all become homeless for different reasons: abuse, poverty, and addiction. Since another major cause of homelessness is mental illness, she decided that she should eventually write about that topic as well. While rereading a Calvin and Hobbes compilation, she realized that in modern times, Calvin would likely receive a schizophrenia diagnosis, and conceived the notion of "Calvin, having schizophrenia, feel[ing] that he's been given this illness by Bill Watterson, his creator" and asking Watterson to cure him; since a pilgrimage to find Bill Watterson did not in itself seem particularly interesting, Leavitt integrated elements from the story of Dave Voelker, who walked across the ice of Lake Erie in winter.

She stated she read the comic strip at night and books on schizophrenia and Lake Erie during the day to help her write the novel, her tenth for young adults. Writing the book demanded a significant amount of research on schizophrenia, and she consumed both writings about the condition and by people with the disorder. In an interview with the Deseret News, she said understanding mental illness takes place on a spectrum allowed her to write Calvin, as everyone is on the continuum, to which she could relate. Her objective was to ask questions about mental health, to which she did not know the answers, and demonstrate talking about mental health is acceptable.

Leavitt said she had profound respect for Watterson, and did not attempt to contact him, as she believed this would go against his beliefs. Watterson did not approve, license, or endorse the book.

== Reception ==
My characters are so willing to be vulnerable. Calvin is willing to be vulnerable about his illness, and Susie is willing to be vulnerable about how she feels about Calvin, and I think that's what appeals to people.

— Leavett on why she believes people relate to Calvin

Upon release, Calvin won two literary awards and received mostly positive reviews from critics, with Publishers Weekly, Kirkus Reviews, Booklist, The Horn Book Magazine, and Quill and Quire listing it as either a pick or a starred review. The novel won the 2016 Governor General's Award for English-language children's literature, an award presented by the Canada Council to promote English and French literature from Canada, and a Whitney Award for general young adult fiction, presented by an organization which promotes novels by Latter Day Saint authors.

Critics noted the book's multiple references to the original comic strip. In a five-star review, a writer for Common Sense Media stated that those who know the strip will appreciate the in-universe jokes and references in the novel, though those who do not may find them difficult to understand. Karen Coats of The Bulletin of the Center for Children's Books stated insider nods to the comic strip were prevalent and that although not understanding them limits the reader's grasp on the humor, the deeper understanding of the text can still be gleaned.

Character development and analysis was another prevalent theme amongst reviewers. Common Sense Media called Susie the feature of the book, with her no-nonsense attitude and persistent friendship. Kirkus described Calvin's soul as "unbroken", Hobbes' observations as "biting", and Susie as "loyal". At Quill and Quire, Eisha Marjara noted how Calvin represented "many forms of being 'different'", though he had an "aching desire for normality," while in Canadian Children's Book News, Lisa Doucet recounted him as "earnest and genuine, particularly in his reflections about his schizophrenia".

Several publications commented on the book's treatment of schizophrenia, particularly in relation to the teenage years. Publishers Weekly called Calvin an irreverent but sensitive journey on a solemn topic, and noted the possibility that Susie's participation in Calvin's quest may be another hallucination. Like Publishers Weekly, Kirkus Reviews stated the novel "sensitively deals with an uncommon but very real teen issue" and characterized it as "far more than the sum of its parts". Doucet described Calvin's issues as sensitively illustrated.

Julia Smith of Booklist said the text never downplayed the gravity of the disease, while Coats emphasized the novel's new take on the utmost queries of teenage angst, including "how do we know the difference between what we imagine and what is real", "how should friendships and romantic relationships work", and "how should we grieve the loss of childhood". Coats, though, went on to characterize it as "schizophrenia-lite" and a treatise more on philosophy than psychology.

Coats found it to have an unlikely premise. Jonathan Hunt of The Horn Book Magazine noted how the book lacked dialog tags and quotation marks, which obscured the line between Calvin's internal state and the outside world. Marjara called the novel very polished, with essentially unflawed writing and "a plot that could have been hokey but is anything but", and compared Leavitt's dialogue to that of David Mamet. Smith called Calvin's voice novel and humorous, while Coats praised how its dialogue advanced. In the School Library Journal, Laura Lutz stated "Calvin's stream-of-consciousness rants can drag the story down", and called the ending strained, though she stated there were "genuinely beautiful moments in the writing throughout".

Awards and honors for Calvin
Year	Award	Result	Ref.
2015	Whitney Award for General Young Adult Fiction	Won	
2015	Shelf Awareness best young adult books of the year, 2015	Selection	
2015	Ontario Library Association Best Bets, young adult fiction	Selection	
2016	Governor General's Award for English-language children's literature	Won	
2016	Canadian Children's Book Centre Best Books for Children and Teens	Selection	
2016	YALSA Best Fiction for Young Adults	Selection	
2017	White Pine Award	Nominee	
2017	IBBY Canada Outstanding Books for Young People with Disabilities	Selection	

== Analysis ==
In the Journal of Research on Libraries & Young Adults, Diane Scrofano categorized Calvin as a restitution narrative, in which the disability is cured, in Arthur Frank's three categories of disability narratives; she found the novel to most closely follow the restitution narrative out of any books in her sample. Due to antipsychotic medication's side effects which often lead to medication noncompliance, she states Calvin's cure is "a bit too tidy".
