= Teresa Toten =

Canadian writer (born 1955)

- Born: October 13, 1955 (age 70)
- Occupation: Author
- Writing career
- Genre: Young adult fiction
- Website: www.teresatoten.com

Teresa Toten (born October 13, 1955) is a Canadian writer.

The daughter of a Canadian father and a Croatian mother, she was born in Zagreb and left with her parents for Canada on the day she was born. They settled in Delhi; her father died when she just seven months old. Two or three years later, she moved with her mother to Toronto, the first of many moves during her childhood. Toten received a BA and then an MA in political science from the University of Toronto. She married and moved to Montreal. She did some broadcasts for Radio Canada International there. The couple moved to Ottawa where they spent seven years before moving to Toronto. They had two daughters there and Toten first started writing. They later moved to New York City, later returning to Toronto.

Toten has also reviewed children's books for Quill & Quire magazine.

== Selected works ==
- The Only House (1995), finalist for a Ruth Schwartz Award
- The Game (2001), finalist for a Governor General's Award, named a Best Book for Young Adults by the American Library Association, on the Best List of Voice of Youth Advocates magazine
- Me and the Blondes, young adult novel (2006), finalist for a Governor General's Award and for a Young Adult Book Award by the Canadian Library Association
- Piece by Piece: Stories about Fitting into Canada, anthology edited by Teresa Toten (2010)
- The Taming (2012), with Eric Walters
- The Unlikely Hero of Room 13B (2013), received the Governor General's Award for English-language children's literature
