= J. M. S. Careless =

Canadian historian (1919–2009)

J. M. S. Careless OC OOnt FRSC
- Born: James Maurice Stockford Careless; February 17, 1919; Toronto, Ontario
- Died: April 6, 2009 (aged 90); Toronto, Ontario
- Education: University of Trinity College; Harvard University
- Occupation: historian
- Awards: Order of Canada; Order of Ontario

James Maurice Stockford Careless OC OOnt FRSC (February 17, 1919 – April 6, 2009) was a Canadian historian. He taught history at the University of Toronto for 39 years, from 1945 until his retirement in 1984, and served as Chairman of the History Department from 1959 to 1967. He was known for his work in Canadian history, particularly his elaboration of the metropolitan-hinterland thesis and his studies on urban history. He twice won the Governor General's Awards for English-language non-fiction books for Canada: A Story of Challenge (1953) and his biography Brown of the Globe (1963).

== Early life ==
J.M.S. Careless was born in Toronto, Ontario and attended the University of Toronto Schools. He received a Bachelor of Arts degree in 1940 from Trinity College at the University of Toronto. He attended Harvard University and received a Master's degree in 1941 and a PhD in 1950.

During the Second World War, he worked in the historical branch of Naval Service Headquarters at Ottawa, then transferred to the Department of External Affairs, where he served as Canadian Diplomatic Officer aboard the exchange ship MS Gripsholm.

== Career ==
Careless began lecturing at the University of Toronto in 1945, where he taught graduate and undergraduate courses in Canadian political, ethnic, urban and intellectual history. He was appointed Assistant Professor in 1949, became a full Professor in 1959 and served as Chairman of the Department of History from 1959 to 1967. Careless was President of the Ontario Historical Society in 1959 and served as Vice-Chairman of the provincial Archaeological and Historic Sites Board. He was made Professor Emeritus in 1984.

In 1962, he was made a Fellow of the Royal Society of Canada and was awarded the J.B. Tyrrell Historical Medal. From 1963 to 1973, he was a Trustee for the Ontario Science Centre. From 1975 to 1981, he was a Director of the Ontario Heritage Foundation.

In 1981, he was made an Officer of the Order of Canada for his "ability to interpret Canadian history to the general reading public". In 1987, he was awarded the Order of Ontario.

== Personal life ==
Careless married Elizabeth Isobel Robinson on December 31, 1940. The couple had five children and ten grandchildren.

== Awards and honours ==
=== Awards ===
- Governor General's Award, 1953, 1963
- University of British Columbia Medal for Biography, 1960
- J.B. Tyrrell Historical Medal, 1962
- Royal Society of Canada Fellow, 1962
- Cruikshank Medal, Ontario Historical Society, 1967
- City of Toronto Award, 1984, 1985
- Order of Canada, 1981
- Order of Ontario, 1987
- National Heritage Award, 1987

=== Honorary degrees ===
- Laurentian University, 1979
- Memorial University, 1981
- University of Victoria, 1982
- Royal Roads University, 1983
- McMaster University, 1983
- University of New Brunswick, 1984
- University of Calgary, 1986

== Selected bibliography ==
- Canada: A Story of Challenge (1953), winner of the 1953 Governor General's Awards
- The Union of the Canadas (1967)
- Brown of the Globe Volume 1 (1959) and Volume 2 (1963), winner of the 1963 Governor General's Awards
- Rise of Cities in Canada (1978)
- The Pre-Confederation Premiers: Ontario Government Leaders, 1841-1867 (1980)
- Toronto to 1918: An Illustrated History (1984), winner of the City of Toronto Book Award
- Frontier and Metropolis (1989)
- Careless at Work: Selected Canadian Historical Studies (1990)
- Ontario, A Celebration of Heritage (2 volumes 1991, 1992)
- Canada, A Celebration of Heritage (2 volumes 1994, 1995)

=== Historical Consultant ===
J.M.S. Careless has served as a historical consultant for many films and television shows, including:

- Lord Elgin: Voice of the People, 1959
- Charles Tupper: The Big Man, 1961
- John A. Macdonald: The Impossible Idea, 1961
- Joseph Howe: The Tribune of Nova Scotia, 1961
- Lord Durham, 1961
- Robert Baldwin: A Matter of Principle, 1961
- William Lyon Mackenzie: A Friend to His Country, 1961
- Alexander Galt: The Stubborn Idealist, 1962
- Louis-Hippolyte Lafontaine, 1962
- John Cabot: A Man of the Renaissance, 1964
- The Last Voyage of Henry Hudson, 1964
- Selkirk of Red River, 1964
- David Thompson: The Great Mapmaker, 1964
- Alexander Mackenzie: The Lord of the North, 1964
- Origins: A History of Canada, TV series, 1987
