= E. K. Johnston =

Canadian novelist and forensic archaeologist

- Born: Emily Kate Johnston; Huron East, Ontario, Canada
- Occupations: Novelist; forensic archaeologist
- Writing career
- Genres: Speculative fiction; young adult fiction
- Notable works: A Thousand Nights; Exit, Pursued by a Bear
- Website: ekjohnston.ca

Emily Kate Johnston, who publishes as E.K. Johnston, is a Canadian novelist and forensic archaeologist.

== Career ==
Johnston started writing fan fiction in 2002, and wrote her first manuscript in 2009. Her first book, The Story of Owen: Dragon Slayer of Trondheim, was published in 2014, and is set in an alternate present-day Ontario where dragons are both real and a menace. A review in The New York Times called the book "a clever first step in the career of a novelist who [...] has many more songs to sing." It was nominated for the William C. Morris Award in 2015. A sequel, Prairie Fire, followed in 2015.

Johnston's third book was A Thousand Nights, a retelling of One Thousand and One Nights. C.S. Lewis's descriptions of the desert in The Horse and His Boy inspired the setting. A companion book, Spindle, followed in 2016, which was a reinterpretation of Sleeping Beauty.

Her fifth novel, Exit, Pursued By A Bear, was published in 2016. Inspired by Shakespeare's The Winter's Tale, it tells the story of cheerleading captain Hermione Winters, who discovers she is pregnant after being sexually assaulted at a camp party. It was written partially as a response to Stephen Woodworth's 2013 bill to re-criminalise abortion. It was named a book of the year by NPR, Publishers Weekly, and the New York Public Library. It won the Canadian Children's Book Centre's Amy Mathers Teen Book Award in 2017.

Johnston was asked to wrote a book on the Star Wars character Ahsoka Tano, published in October 2016. The novel, Ahsoka, fills in the gap between the character's appearances in the TV series The Clone Wars and Rebels. Johnston's second Star Wars novel, Queen's Shadow, was released in March 2019. Featuring Padmé Amidala, Queen's Shadow is set in the years between the events of films The Phantom Menace and Attack of the Clones. Additionally, she co-wrote (with Ashley Eckstein) the story "By Whatever Sun" focusing on Miara Larte, a character Johnston created in Ahsoka, and set during the events of A New Hope.

Johnston's novel That Inevitable Victorian Thing is an alternate future young adult romance, published in 2017.

Johnston released another Star Wars novel, Queen's Peril, on June 2, 2020.

== Personal life ==
Johnston is biromantic and demisexual.

== Bibliography ==
=== Novels ===
- The Story of Owen: Dragon Slayer of Trondheim (2014)
- Prairie Fire (2015)
- A Thousand Nights (2015)
- Spindle (2016) (also published as Kingdom of Sleep)
- Exit, Pursued By A Bear (2016)
- That Inevitable Victorian Thing (2017)
- The Afterward (2019)
- Aetherbound (2021)
- Pretty Furious (2024)
- Titan of the Stars (2025)
- Sky on Fire (2025)

=== Short stories ===
- "Work In Progress" (2017) (in Three Sides of A Heart: Stories about Love Triangles, edited by Natalie C. Parker)

=== Star Wars ===
- Ahsoka (2016)
- "By Whatever Sun" (2017) (with Ashley Eckstein, in From A Certain Point Of View)
- Queen's Shadow (2019)
- Queen's Peril (2020)
- Queen's Hope (2022)
- Crimson Climb (2023)

=== Dungeons & Dragons ===
- Honor Among Thieves: The Druid's Call (2022)

== Awards ==
Year	Nominated work	Award	Result
2015	The Story of Owen: Dragon Slayer of Trondheim	William C. Morris Award	Shortlisted
2016	A Thousand Nights	Governor General's Literary Award for English-language young people's literature - text	Finalist
2017	Exit, Pursued by a Bear	Amy Mathers Teen Book Award	Winner
