= Blood Like Magic =

2021 novel by Liselle Sambury

- First edition
- Author: Liselle Sambury
- Language: English
- Genres: Young adult, science fiction
- Publisher: Simon and Schuster
- Publication date: 15 June 2021
- Publication place: Canada

Blood Like Magic is a 2021 young adult science fantasy novel by Trinidadian Canadian writer Liselle Sambury. Sambury's debut novel, it was published on 15 June 2021 by Margaret K. McElderry Books, an imprint of Simon & Schuster and follows Voya, a teenager who is asked to kill her first love in order to save her family's magic.

== Plot ==
Set in the year 2049 in Toronto, Voya Thomas is called by her ancestors and given a challenge in order to receive her magic. Afraid of being banished and humiliated because she refused her calling, her ancestor Mama Jova force her to witness her execution as a slave and she commands her to kill her first love or else magic will be taken away from her family. Voya is given 30 days to finish the plan and as she forms a bond with a boy named Luc, whom she plans to kill but soon she learns more secrets about her family and she begins to question the original intention of the act.

== Reception ==
The book received several positive receptions from reviewers and readers. It was one of the most anticipated books of 2021. A review from Locus Magazine stated that it is a "novel that embraces technological advances while wholly immersing the text with magic." Another review by Culturess praised it contents by saying "It’s a story that effortlessly weaves together different cultures, sexualities, and gender identities to create something that feels fresh and necessary".

Kirkus Reviews called it "A breath of fresh air for the genre; readers will be spellbound."

The novel was a shortlisted finalist for the Governor General's Award for English-language children's literature at the 2021 Governor General's Awards, and for the Amy Mathers Teen Book Award at the 2022 Canadian Children's Book Centre awards.
