= True Confessions of a Heartless Girl =

2002 young adults novel by Martha Brooks

- Author: Martha Brooks
- Illustrator: Erik Mohr
- Language: English
- Genre: Young adult fiction
- Publisher: Groundwood Books/Douglas & McIntyre
- Pages: 210
- Awards: Governor General's Award for English-language children's literature (2002)
- ISBN: 0-88899-476-1

True Confessions of a Heartless Girl is a 2002 novel by Canadian author Martha Brooks, her seventh novel for young adults. It received the 2002 Governor General's Award for English-language children's literature.

True Confessions of a Heartless Girl tells the story of Noreen Stall, a troubled and possibly pregnant seventeen-year-old girl who stumbles upon the town of Pembina Lake after stealing her boyfriend's truck and savings.

== Plot summary ==
=== Part 1: The Stranger ===
On a stormy July night, Lynda Bradley, the owner of The Molly Thorvaldson Café, notices a pair of headlights pull up in front of the café just before closing time. She allows the flustered looking teenage girl from inside the truck to come in and have a cup of coffee. Lynda learns that this girl's name is Noreen and tells her that she is in Pembina Lake. Noticing that she is most likely in some sort of trouble with no place to go, Lynda makes up the cot for her to sleep on that night. Later on, Noreen notices something slimy in the couch cushions, a gnawed-on chicken leg, and tosses it to the dog. In the morning, Dolores Harper comes by to help with the café like she does every Saturday morning. Meanwhile, Tessie, Seth's dog, is sick and so is Noreen.

=== Part 2: True Confessions ===
• Confessions of Pride - Noreen Age 12: Noreen recalls the day of her 19-year-old stepsister's wedding. Noreen is angry and upset because this means she will be left alone with Bob and Amazing. Noreen tells Gladys she looks like hell as she walks out of the room.

• Confessions of Lust - Noreen Age 14: Noreen hates the way Bob, her stepfather, looks at her. As she is leaving the house to meet up with her boyfriend at the time, Brad, Bob remarks that she looks like a hooker. He also says that she better not get herself knocked up like her mother did. Noreen's mother was pregnant with her at age 17, and was on welfare by age 18. This was when she was rescued by Bob. Noreen then goes to meet up with Brad and fools around with him anyway.

• Confessions of Sloth - Noreen Age 15: Noreen's mother is angry that she has skipped 10 days of school that month. Since Noreen will not listen to her, Amazing calls her stepsister, Gladys. Gladys asks her why she is not in school and tells her to stop acting out. Noreen will not take Gladys' advice either.

• Confessions of Anger - Noreen Age 16: Gladys was always the one to hold Noreen tight while their parents fought. One night, Bob opens their door and stands in the doorway, waiting to hear a sound out of them. Noreen cannot stop giggling so he comes into the room and picks her up by the arm. She feels a sharp pain in her arm and is later given a sling to wear. She keeps it on far longer than necessary to remind Bob of what he's done. This stops him from touching her again and so he instead takes his anger out on Gladys until she marries Gerry and moves away. Noreen begins living with them on the condition that she finishes high school and visits home once a week.

• Confessions of Covetousness - Noreen Age 17: After being left by her boyfriend, Tyler, in a Mexican restaurant in Saskatoon, she starts hitchhiking her way back to Winnipeg. After a frightening hitchhiking experience, she begins walking along the highway. Near Brandon, a boy named Wesley Cuthand picks her up. He offers to drive her anywhere and they end up staying in a cheap motel outside of Winnipeg for 2 days and 3 nights until his pay cheque runs out. They drive to Gladys' house where Noreen picks up some belongings and announces that she is moving out. Gladys had the cops out looking for her and is upset that Noreen is breaking her promise to finish high school as she is still responsible for her. Noreen moves into Wesley's apartment. She sleeps or watches T.V. while he works 12- to 13-hour days. He doesn't care what she does, as long as she is truthful. After Noreen discovers the coffee tin full of Wesley's savings, she takes some of it to buy food for their dinner. She cleans the house and prepares their dinner which makes him happy. He doesn't seem to notice that Noreen spent his money. The next time she takes money, it is to make starry curtains around the bed. As soon as Wesley sees them, he goes to look inside his coffee tin and is so furious that she didn't ask his permission first that he storms out of the apartment. Noreen decides then that she should leave. But first, she looks at her long blonde hair in the mirror and cuts it because Wesley loves it. She then takes the rest of his money, his truck, and locks him out of his own apartment.

=== Part 3: The Wages of Sin ===
Dolores finally hears Noreen's full story and asks her whether she loves Wesley. Noreen replies that she doesn't because she doesn't love anyone. Dolores feels a sense of power that she had before her daughter, Mirella, got sick and died from leukemia. She remembers Mirella's woeful teenage years. Dolores convinces Noreen to call Wesley and he shows up later that day. Noreen throws all his money at him and gives him back his truck keys. He's about to leave when he suddenly turns around and gives Noreen back some of his money. She tells him that she never loved him. However, he says that if the baby she is carrying looks anything like him, he'll give her his truck. She tells him that she will make sure that the baby is never born.

Dolores convinces Wesley to go for a drive with her to Tiger Lily Hill, where there is good deep spirit and where answers can be found. Dolores ends up calming him down and tells him that someone will need to be a father. When she returns to the café, Dolores notices that Tessie, the dog, has been sick all over the yard. Lynda takes Tessie to the vet, where she has to stay until she is better; as the ultrasound found shards of chicken bone in her intestine. Del sees Lynda's car parked outside the vet and decides to stop by. He ends up driving her home and promises to drive her back in the morning to visit Tessie. The two of them talk in his truck for a long time before they go into Mary's house, where everyone is gathered.

Meanwhile, Wesley tries to forget about Noreen. He stands in front of the mirror and looks at the strands of Noreen's long blonde hair that he hasn't yet cleaned up. He remembers something about warriors cutting their hair short when they are in mourning and decides then to cut his hair. Back in Pembina Lake, Del offers Noreen the lakeside cottage for her to stay in for the night. She is cold when she wakes up and misses Wesley's big fleece sweater that is still at the café. Then she misses Wesley and realizes that she is very much in love with him. She starts a fire in the fireplace but cannot figure out why the smoke is not going up the chimney. The fire spreads and envelops a box of Del's photo albums, part of the rug and an old chair. Dolores senses that something is wrong and hurries to Del's cottage. She finds Noreen fighting back the fire and immediately starts helping. After the fire has been put out, Dolores tells Noreen that the smoke wouldn't go up the chimney because she didn't open the flue. Noreen has no idea what a flue is.

=== Part 4: Star ===
Del mourns the loss of his photos and tries the remember the memories that went with them. The rug that is now burnt was purchased by his brother Danny, who died 34 years ago. This makes him feel so much lonelier now that it is gone. Noreen is too ashamed to face him but Del doesn't blame her for it because he remembers his own shame. Back at the café, Tessie is home but has an infection that needs to be treated with antibiotics. Noreen is also home and the ladies debate what to do with her while she sleeps. Dolores wants Noreen to stay with her for a while but Mary insists that she is much too old.

Later that night, Noreen walks down to the lake and decides to go for a swim. She is thinking and testing fate at the same time. However, she doesn't realize that Seth and Tessie have followed her down to the water. They see her clothes but cannot see her. Just as Seth is wading into the water, Del finds them. Noreen sees the lights and swims back to shore, saying that she accidentally swam out too far. The three of them sit down and Del tells them the story of how his older brother, Danny, drowned in the lake 34 years ago. He tells them how his brother's last words were angry words towards him. Seth asks why and Del answers that he had been "holding hands" with Danny's wife, Vera.

Del and Noreen strike a deal that Noreen will work for Lynda in order to repay him for the lost photographs and rug. It takes 30 minutes to convince Lynda to hire her even though she will be working for no pay. Lynda also asks for $80 a month to pay for the food she eats. Later on, Noreen gets a deep pain inside of her and has spotting on her underwear. Lynda gets her an emergency appointment in Willow Point. Noreen gets an ultrasound and his amazed at the tiny white flashing blip on the screen. She thinks that it looks like a little star. Her baby is strong and healthy and she decides to temporarily call it Star.

One day, when Lynda and Noreen are sitting in the café, Noreen suggests that they look behind the wallpaper to see if they can repaint the walls. She peels part of the wallpaper back and a huge piece of plaster falls away from the wall. Lynda says nothing as she gathers up her son and the dog and drives away. Noreen doesn't know what to do so she tries the clean up the mess from the wall but it is dusty and crumbly. Not long after, the driver of the weekly Grey Goose bus comes into the café for a pack of cigarettes. He asks if anyone will be taking a trip that week. Noreen thinks about everything she has done wrong and consequently, she is packed and on the bus within 5 minutes. As the bus passes a junction in the road, she recognizes Lynda's red hatch-back and Del's big green truck. She demands that the driver let her off, and he grudgingly does so, insisting that she won't get her money back. The walk back to the café takes 2 hours in the smoldering heat.

When Noreen returns to the café, Lynda is still furious with her but Del defends her, saying that it would have collapsed sooner or later because of the water damage. Del offers to fix everything and Noreen helps him. The following day is Saturday and Lynda is angry that she cannot open because it is her busiest day. Noreen suggests that she open anyway, because the wall will give people something to talk about. Noreen ends up being right; a stream of customers come and go throughout the day. In the afternoon, Mary doesn't show up like she usually does so Dolores walks over to her house. She finds her asleep on the couch, watching a re-run of Oprah in a gravy stained sweater that is buttoned up wrong. Dolores wakes her up and they talk until Mary tells her about the stroke she had earlier on in the year. This explains why the two of them no longer go on drives together and why Mary won't fly to the Maritimes alone. They later decide that they will travel to Prince Edward Island to visit Mary's family together.

Meanwhile, Del tells Noreen that her debt to him is paid and that he realizes he is not doing her any favors by keeping her in Pembina Lake. Later that night, Noreen goes into Lynda's room and tells her that Del is crazy about her. Noreen also calls Wesley, telling him that she wants to apologize. He comes to the café later and the two of them end up spending the night together. In the morning, he asks if she loves him but she doesn't answer so he drives away.

On Lynda's birthday, Del gets her a new café sign that says "Lynda's". They all sit down to have cake but Noreen goes to the bathroom and finds that she has more spotting. She decides that it is time for her to call Gladys, and goes outside to use the payphone. When she returns, everyone looks upset. Seth tells her that his mother is going to close the café. Noreen feels weird and goes back to the washroom where she finds a huge blood clot and knows that she has lost the baby. Dolores calls Wesley and he is there within the hour. Later that night, down by the water, Noreen tells Del that Lynda is madly in love with him. He abruptly gets up and speeds back to the café.

The following morning, Wesley and Noreen go to the clinic in Willow Point to confirm what she already knows to be true. After this, she tells Wesley, for the first time, that she loves him.

== Characters ==
- Noreen Stall, a reckless 17-year-old girl who may or may not be pregnant with Wesley's child. She has uneven short blonde hair because she decides on a whim to cut it herself. She cusses and is followed by trouble wherever she goes, but this does not stop people from caring about her.
- Lynda Bradley, a 36-year-old divorced mother who used to teach at R.G. McGrath. She now runs The Molly Thorvaldson Café (later changed to Linda's) that she inherited from her stepfather, Joe Hartman. She also realizes that she is in love with Del.
- Seth Bradley, Lynda's 5-year-old son. He is pesky but loveable. He always seems to be able to put two and two together even though he is much younger than everybody else. He accepts Noreen right away and treats her like an older sister.
- Dolores Harper, a 76-year-old widow with the energy of a 60-year-old who likes to help out in the café every Saturday morning. She can search out any lie and gives the best advice.
- Mirella Harper, Dolores' only daughter who died at age 36 of leukemia the previous summer.
- Mary Reed, she loves to gossip and belittle people but would never miss church on a Sunday. She is one of Dolores' oldest friends. However, the original closeness between them is gone until Dolores discovers that Mary had a stroke earlier on in the year. This is why they no longer take drives together.
- Ronnie, Mary's grandson who is married to Clarissa. They are the parents of Caitlin Louise, Mary's first great-grandchild. They live on Prince Edward Island in the Maritimes.
- Del Armstrong, a bachelor farmer in his early fifties. He is filled with regret because of something he did in the past. He spends his time restoring his brother's cottage by the lake and helping Lynda whenever he can, because he is in love with her.
- Danny Armstrong, Del's older brother who drowned in the lake 34 years ago after finding out that Del and his wife, Vera, were intimate.
- Wesley Cuthand, is Cree and Noreen's current boyfriend. He is almost 21 and works at Dan's Construction in Brandon. He values the truth and expects it even though he hardly ever gets it. He used to have long black hair, but cut it when Noreen left him.
- Bradley, Noreen's ex-boyfriend from when she was 14.
- Tyler, Noreen's most recent ex-boyfriend who left her in Saskatoon.
- Gladys, Noreen's 24-year-old stepsister who is married to Gerry. Gladys essentially takes care of Noreen after Gladys' father, Bob, marries Noreen's mother.
- Amazing, whose real name is Grace. She was pregnant with Noreen at age 17. According to Noreen, she is either drunk or working.
- Bob, Noreen's stepfather. He is nice before he is married to Amazing and buys Noreen a doll, but once they are married, he becomes abusive and perverted.
