= Deborah Ellis =

Canadian fiction writer and activist

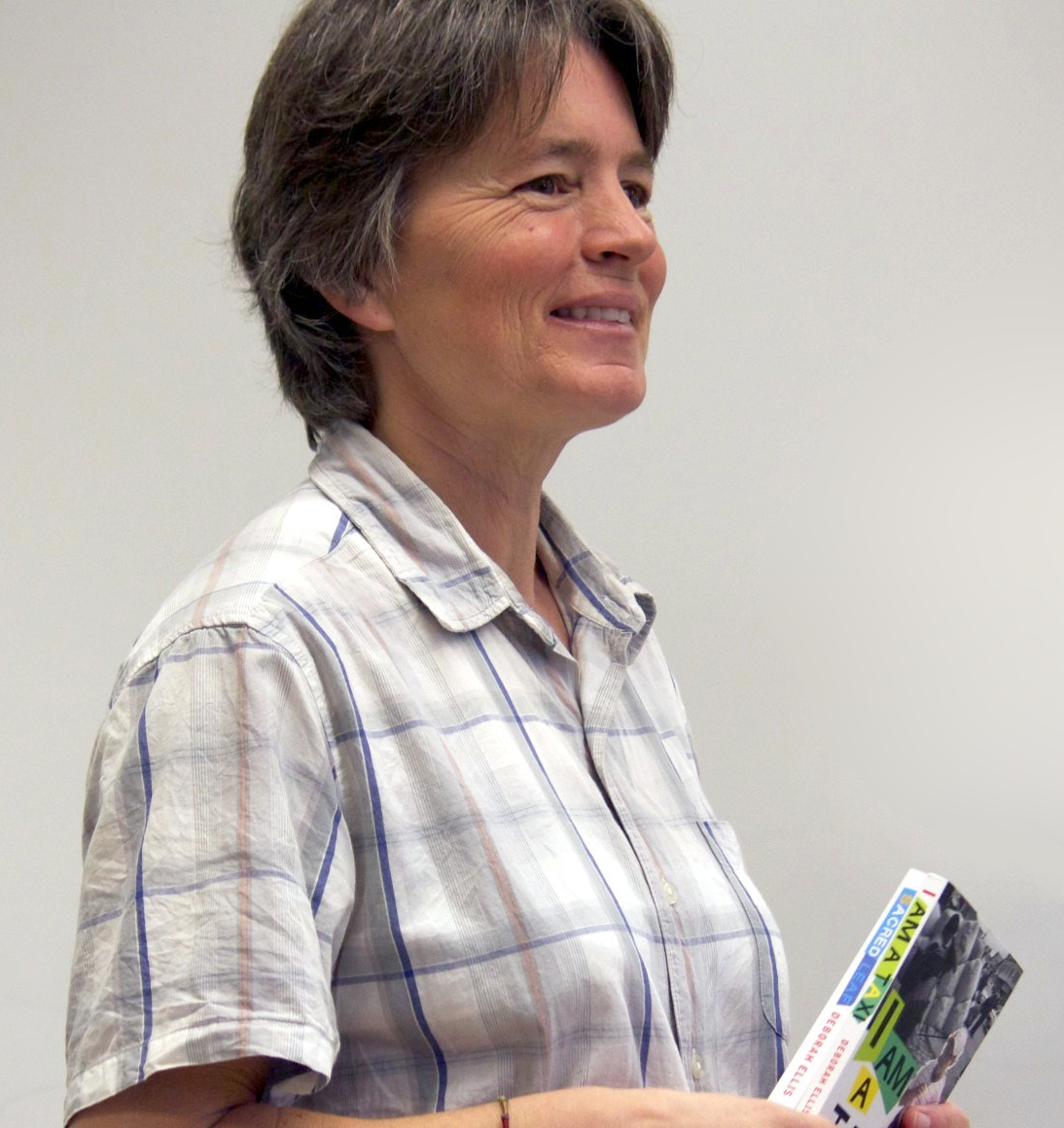
- Deborah Ellis in Renaissance, Florida, 2011.
- Born: August 7, 1960 (age 66); Cochrane, Ontario, Canada
- Occupations: Writer, activist and feminist.
- Writing career
- Notable works: Looking for X (1999); The Breadwinner series (2001–2022)

Deborah Ellis CM OOnt (born August 7, 1960) is a Canadian fiction writer and activist. Her themes are often concerned with the sufferings of persecuted children in the Third World.

== Early life ==
Born in Cochrane Ontario, Ellis and her family moved several times during her childhood due to her parents. Ellis started writing when she was 11 or 12 years old.

== Career ==
Much of her work as a writer has been inspired by her travels and conversations with people from around the world and their stories (like the Breadwinner where she went to Afghanistan to meet refugees) . She has held many jobs advocating for the peace movement and the anti-war movement.

She travelled to Pakistan in 1997 to interview refugees at an Afghan refugee camp. From these interviews, she wrote The Breadwinner series, which includes The Breadwinner (2001), a book about a girl named Parvana; Parvana's Journey (2002), its sequel; Mud City (2003), about Shauzia, Parvana's best friend; and My Name is Parvana (2011), the fourth book in the series. While The Breadwinner was inspired by an interview with a mother and a girl who disguised herself as a boy in a refugee camp, the subsequent books in the series were more imaginative explorations of how children would survive.

In 1999, her novel Looking for X was published. It follows a young girl in her day-to-day life in a poor area of Toronto and it received the Governor General's Award for English-language children's literature in 2000.

One of her best-known works is the 2004 book The Heaven Shop, which tells of a family of orphans in Malawi who are struggling with sudden displacement as a result of the HIV/AIDS epidemic. The novel was written to dispel myths about HIV/AIDS and celebrate the courage of child sufferers.

In 2006, she wrote the best-seller I Am a Taxi, which tells the story of a Bolivian boy named Diego whose family was accused of smuggling coca paste, which is used to produce cocaine. After an accident causes Diego's family to owe money to the prison in which they are incarcerated, the boy must earn them money. He ends up in the coca "pits" where the leaves of the plant are made into coca paste, and the story follows his adventures from there. The sequel, Sacred Leaf, is about Diego's time with the Ricardos (a family who helped Diego) and a giant coca-leaf protest.

In 2007, with Eric Walters, Ellis wrote Bifocal, a novel about racism and terrorists in Canada.

In 2008, Ellis published Lunch with Lenin and Other Stories, a collection of short stories that explores the lives of children who have been affected, directly or indirectly, by drugs. The stories are set against backdrops as diverse as the remote north of Canada, the Red Square in Moscow, and an opium farm in Afghanistan.

In 2014, she published Moon at Nine, a YA novel based on the true story of two teenage girls who were arrested and thrown in prison in Iran, a country where homosexuality is punishable by death.

The fifth book in Ellis's Breadwinner series, One More Mountain, was published by Groundwood books in 2022. It takes up Parvana's story as the Americans are leaving Afghanistan and the Taliban are regaining control in Kabul.

== Honour ==
In 2006, Ellis was named to the Order of Ontario.

Ellis is the recipient of the Governor General's Award, the Jane Addams Children's Book Award, the Vicky Metcalf Award for a body of work, an ALA Notable, and the Children's Africana Book Award Honor Book for Older Readers.

In December 2016, Ellis was named a Member of the Order of Canada.

== Personal life ==
Ellis is a philanthropist, donating almost all of her royalties on her books to such organizations as "Canadian Women for Women in Afghanistan" and UNICEF.

== Selected bibliography ==
These are some of the works of Deborah Ellis:

The Breadwinner Quintet

- The Breadwinner (2001)
- Parvana's Journey (2002)
- Mud City (2003)
- My Name is Parvana (2011)
- One More Mountain (2022)

Other Works

- Looking for X (1999)
- Women of the Afghan War (2000)
- A Company of Fools (2002)
- The Heaven Shop (2004)
- I Am a Taxi (2006)
- Click (with David Almond, Eoin Colfer, Roddy Doyle, Nick Hornby, Margo Lanagan, Gregory Maguire, Ruth Ozeki, Linda Sue Park, and Tim Wynne-Jones, 2007)
- Jakeman (2007)
- Bifocal (with Eric Walters, 2007)
- Sacred Leaf (2007)
- Lunch with Lenin|Lunch with Lenin and Other Stories (2008)
- Off to War (2008)
- We Want You to Know: Kids Talk About Bullying (2009)
- No Safe Place (2010)
- No Ordinary Day (2011)
- True Blue (2011)
- Looks Like Daylight: Stories of Indigenous Kids (2013)
- The Cat at The Wall (2014)
- Moon at Nine (2014)
- Sit (2017)
