= Liselle Sambury =

Trinidadian Canadian writer

Liselle Sambury is a Trinidadian Canadian writer of young adult fantasy literature, whose debut novel Blood Like Magic was a finalist for the Governor General's Award for English-language children's literature at the 2021 Governor General's Awards.

A native of Toronto, Ontario, Sambury majored in linguistics and also took creative writing courses at Queen's University. Blood Like Magic was published in 2021 by Simon & Schuster. She currently resides in Hamilton, a city which she used as a setting in her novel Delicious Monsters.

She received nominations for the Amy Mathers Teen Book Award in 2022 for Blood Like Magic, and in 2024 for Delicious Monsters.
