= Canadian Newspaper Association =

Former trade association (1996–2016)

Canadian Newspapers Association
- Successor: News Media Canada
- Established: 1996
- Dissolved: 2016; 10 years ago

The Canadian Newspapers Association (CNA) was a national trade association for newspaper publishers in Canada from 1996 to 2016. It represented the publishers of over 100 Canadian daily newspapers published in both English and French. The CNA administered the Edward Goff Penny Memorial Prizes for Young Canadian Journalists, first established in 1991.

The Canadian Newspapers Association and the Canadian Community Newspapers Association voted to merge in 2016 to form News Media Canada.
