= The Hollow Tree =

1997 children's historical novel by Janet Lunn

- First edition
- Author: Janet Lunn
- Cover artist: Seal Books
- Language: English
- Genre: Children's historical novel
- Publisher: Knopf Canada
- Publication date: 1997
- Publication place: Canada
- Media type: Print (Paperback)
- Preceded by: Shadow in Hawthorn Bay

The Hollow Tree is a 1997 children's historical novel by Canadian author Janet Lunn. The book is the third in a trilogy, the first two being The Root Cellar and Shadow in Hawthorn Bay. Having progressed backward from the American Civil War in The Root Cellar, another few decades in Shadow in Hawthorn Bay, The Hollow Tree takes place during the starting of the American Revolution in 1777.

The main character, Phoebe Olcott, is mentioned briefly in Shadow in Hawthorn Bay as "Phoebe Morrisay," having married Jem Morrisay. Phoebe's suitor, Ben Larkin, is implied to be an ancestor to Rose Larkin, the protagonist of The Root Cellar, while the Morrissay family's descendants would include Will Morrisay, who also appears in The Root Cellar.

== Plot overview ==
Plump little Phoebe Olcott is a timid but helpful 15-year-old girl, admired by her father's students for her quiet temperament and stubbornness. After her father, a schoolteacher, is killed in action while fighting as an American Patriot (commonly known as Rebels) in the quick revolution, she ends up living with her aunt's family, who happen to be Loyalist.

Phoebe continues to hide in the shadows of her cousins Gideon and Anne Robinson until Gideon becomes a British soldier. When he is suddenly found hanged, Phoebe discovers that Gideon was actually a spy and finds a list of names that was entrusted to Gideon and must be delivered to Fort Ticonderoga.

She arrives at Fort Ticonderoga too late; the post has been abandoned. Instead, she finds a bear and a cat and meets Jem Morrissay, whose family happens to be one of the names on the list entrusted to Gideon. Phoebe and Jem form an uneasy relationship and she is reunited with her family and several other Loyalist families fleeing to Upper Canada to avoid persecution by the Patriots.

During the flight of the Loyalists, they capture Japhet Oram, a Loyalist soldier, and are uncertain if he is a deserter or a rebel spy. The leader of the group insists that the soldier be taken to Canada and hanged. When Phoebe's own convictions, background, and morals clash with the more radical of the Loyalists, she soon finds herself isolated from the rest of the group. She secretly cuts Japhet loose and runs away, but is pursued by Jem.

Despite their growing attraction to one another, Phoebe refuses to return to the other Loyalists with Jem. Forced to continue alone, Phoebe begins her dangerous journey to Canada in order to escape the revolution and fulfil Gideon's final mission.

== See also ==
- American Revolution
