= Kerry Wood (author) =

Canadian writer, journalist and scriptwriter

Edgar Allardyce Wood
- Born: 2 June 1907; New York City, United States of America
- Died: July 25, 1998 (aged 91); Red Deer, Alberta
- Occupations: Writer, journalist and scriptwriter
- Children: 3
- Writing career
- Pen name: Kerry Wood
- Notable awards: Governor General's Award for English-language children's literature (1955, 1957); Vicky Metcalf Award for Literature for Young People (1963)

Edgar Allardyce Wood CM (2 June 1907 — 25 July 1998), known by his pen name Kerry Wood, was a Canadian writer, journalist and scriptwriter. During his writing career, Wood primarily wrote for Canadian Broadcasting Corporation radio and television while publishing his own works. For his novels, Wood won the 1955 Governor General's Award for English-language juvenile fiction for The Map-Maker and rewon the Governor General's Award in 1957 for The Great Chief. Outside of writing, Wood built archery equipment from the 1920s to 1970s and was named a Member of the Order of Canada in 1990.

== Early life ==
On 2 June 1907, Wood was born in New York City. During his childhood, Wood lived in various parts of Western Canada before residing in Red Deer, Alberta at the age of eleven. When he was sixteen, Wood began to write after a teacher encouraged him to leave high school and focus on writing.

== Career ==
Wood began his career in 1924 as a freelancer before becoming a newspaper columnist in 1926. As a journalist, Wood wrote for various newspapers throughout Alberta, including the Edmonton Journal and Calgary Herald from 1926 to 1973. During this time period, Wood started building archery equipment in 1937 and was hired by the Canadian Broadcasting Corporation in 1939. With the CBC, Wood primarily wrote scripts for radio shows until 1973, while venturing into television script writing from 1958 to 1965.

Outside of journalism, Wood wrote children's novels between the 1930s and 1980s before releasing his autobiography A Legacy of Laughter in 1986. Wood continued to write until the 1990s when his final book This Smiling Land was published in 1996. For his influences, Wood cited the works of multiple writers including Henry David Thoreau and Percy A. Taverner.

== Awards and honours ==
As a writer, Wood won the Governor General's Award for English-language juvenile fiction twice for The Map-Maker in 1955 and The Great Chief in 1957. Wood received the Vicky Metcalf Award in 1963 from the Canadian Authors Association. In 1990, Wood was named a Member of the Order of Canada. Posthumously, Wood was named one of the 100 Outstanding Albertans by the Calgary Stampede in 2012.

== Personal life ==
Wood was married and had three children. Wood died in Red Deer on 25 July 1998.
