= Nafiza Azad =

Fijian-Canadian author

- Education: University of British Columbia
- Occupation: Writer
- Notable work: The Candle and the Flame (2019)

Nafiza Azad is a Fijian-Canadian young adult fiction fantasy author. Her debut novel, The Candle and the Flame, was released in 2019.

== Early life and education ==
Azad was born in Lautoka, Fiji. Opportunities to access reading materials were limited. Her hometown only contained one library, and readers could only borrow two books at a time, so Azad and her friends often made up stories for entertainment. In 2001, age seventeen, she moved to Canada with her family. Azad entered the University of British Columbia in 2007, initially majoring in biology with the aim of becoming a doctor. However, she later elected to major in English instead, and to aspire to a career in writing. Her thesis consisted of a novel, which she claims to have written after a professor told her not to. Her thesis advisor was Maggie de Vries. Azad currently lives in Vancouver.

== Career ==
Azad's first work, The Candle and the Flame, was published by Scholastic in 2019. She credits American author G. Willow Wilson- who, like her, is both female and Muslim- as a major influence on her decision to pursue a writing career, stating that reading Wilson's novel Alif the Unseen made her feel “as though I had finally found a reflection […] I had a right to my own adventures”, subsequently inspiring her to write fiction of her own. Additionally, she cites S.A. Chakraborty's novel The City of Brass and Franny Billingsley's Chime as influences on the plot and writing style of The Candle and the Flame. As an author, she is represented by Katelyn Detwailer at Jill Grinberg Literary Management.

She is currently a co-founder of, and writer and administrator at Book Wars.

In addition, she has contributed to the YA anthology "Come on In". She is also the editor for the upcoming anthology Writing in Color: The Lessons We've Learned, set to be released in August 2023.

== Works ==
=== The Candle and the Flame (2019) ===
The Candle and the Flame is Azad's debut novel. It was first published on March 1, 2019, by Scholastic Press, an imprint of Scholastic Inc.

The novel is set in the fictional Silk Road city of Noor, in which humans and Djinn- supernatural spirits from Islamic folklore- live side by side. Its plot follows a young woman named Fatima, who is one of the sole survivors of a massacre that wiped out the city's original population, and who becomes entangled in the conflict between its human inhabitants, the Ifrit (a class of Djinn) and evil spirits known as the Shayateen. The city is inspired by and contains elements of South Asian and Middle Eastern cultures, with the novel containing words in Arabic, Punjabi, Urdu and Hindi.

Reception for the novel was generally favourable. Caitlyn Paxson, writing for NPR, praised Azad's capacity for worldbuilding, noting in particular the novel's 'attention to detail and dedication to language'. Booklist's Author Rena Barron noted the novel's 'lush, elaborate world-building', stating that it was 'a must-read for people who love fantasy brimming with beautiful writing and mythology'; it was also praised by other authors of Young Adult and genre fiction including Rachel Hartman, Rebecca Lim and Ausma Zehanat Khan.

=== The Wild Ones (2021) ===
The rights to Azad's second young adult novel, The Wild Ones: A Broken Anthem for a Girl Nation, were acquired by Margaret K. McElderry Books, an imprint of Simon and Schuster's Children's Division, in March 2020. Following a group of young girls with magical abilities in a narrative with multiple perspectives and feminist themes, the novel was published in August 2021.

== Bibliography ==
- The Candle and the Flame (Scholastic Press, 2019)
- The Wild Ones (Margaret K. McElderry Books, 2021)
- Road of the Lost (Margaret K. McElderry Books, 2022)

== Accolades ==
Azad has received nominations for the following awards:

- 2020
  - William C. Morris YA Debut Award for The Candle and the Flame (finalist).
  - Sunburst Award for Excellence in Canadian Literature of the Fantastic for The Candle and the Flame (long-listed).
- 2023
  - Ruth and Sylvia Schwartz Children's Book Awards for Road of the Lost (winner)
