= Looking for X =

Book by Deborah Ellis

- First edition
- Author: Deborah Ellis
- Language: English
- Genre: Children's Literature Young-Adult Fiction
- Publisher: Groundwood Books
- Publication date: September 1, 1999
- Pages: 132 pp
- ISBN: 978-0888993823

Looking for X is a children's novel written for ages 9–12 by Deborah Ellis. This book is about an eleven-year-old girl named Khyber that lives in a poorer area, Regent Park, in Toronto, Ontario. She lives there with her mother and her twin brothers who are both autistic. One day Khyber shows up at school and is accused of breaking the windows of her teacher's classroom. When she is expelled she sets off in the middle of the night to find her friend X, a homeless woman who lives in the park across the street from her house. She is the only one that can clear Khyber's name. She spends all night wandering the streets in search of X and has the adventure of a lifetime.

== Awards ==
- Governor General's Literary Awards Winner 2000 Children's Literature (Text) Canada
- Runner-up in the Groundwood Twentieth Anniversary First Novel for Children Contest
