= A Thousand Nights (novel) =

2015 novel by E. K. Johnston

- Author: E. K. Johnston
- Language: English
- Publisher: Disney Hyperion
- Publication date: 6 October 2015
- Pages: 328
- ISBN: 1484722272
- Followed by: Spindle

A Thousand Nights is a 2015 novel written by E. K. Johnston. It is a retelling of One Thousand and One Nights. Johnston drew on C. S. Lewis's descriptions of the expanse, the precision and the desolation of the desert in The Horse and His Boy when she wrote the book.
