= Janice Lynn Mather =

Bahamian-born Canadian writer

Janice Lynne Mather
- Born: December 29, 1981 (age 44); Bahamas
- Education: University of British Columbia
- Writing career
- Genre: Young adult fiction
- Website: www.janicelynnmather.com

Janice Lynn Mather (born December 29, 1981) is a Bahamian-born Canadian writer and author of young adult fiction based in British Columbia.

Mather moved to Canada in 2002 to study creative writing. She obtained a B.A. and M.A. in fine arts from the University of British Columbia. She has lived in Tsawwassen, British Columbia since 2011.

Mather's first novel, Learning to Breathe, was published in 2018. Fifteen years in the making the novel focuses on 16-year-old Indira Ferguson as she attempts to step out of the shadow of her mother's reputation and find her own path. It was named to the short list of the Governor General's Award for English-language children's literature. Her second novel Facing the Sun, a coming of age story about four young women set in the Bahamas, was published in 2020. The book takes place over the course of a summer during which a property developer signals interest in purchasing a local beach.

Her short story collection Uncertain Kin was published in 2022.
