= Christopher Moore (Canadian historian) =

English-Canadian author, journalist, and blogger

Christopher Hugh Moore
- Born: June 9, 1950 (age 76)
- Occupations: Author, journalist, and blogger
- Writing career
- Notable awards: Governor General's Literary Award

Christopher Hugh Moore (born June 9, 1950) is a Canadian author, journalist, and blogger about Canadian history. A freelance writer since 1978, Moore is unusual among professionally trained Canadian historians in that he supports himself by writing for general audiences. He is a longtime columnist for Canada's History magazine (formerly The Beaver) and the author of many books. He has twice won the Governor General's Literary Awards.

== Early life and education ==
Christopher Hugh Moore was born in Stoke-on-Trent, England, on June 9, 1950. He immigrated to Canada with his family in 1954, was raised in Nelson and Vancouver, British Columbia, and did undergraduate studies at the University of British Columbia. He began his historical career as a researcher with the historic sites service of Parks Canada at Canada's largest historic site reconstruction, the eighteenth-century Fortress of Louisbourg on Cape Breton Island, Nova Scotia. After graduate studies at the University of Ottawa (M.A., History, 1977) and work with the Heritage Canada Foundation, Moore made Louisbourg the subject of his first book, Louisbourg Portraits: Life in An Eighteenth Century Garrison Town.

== Books ==
Louisbourg Portraits explores eighteenth century social history through archivally based studies of ordinary people: an accused thief, a merchant, a young bride, a migrant fisherman, and a soldier. Called "social history as it should be written," by historian Desmond Morton, Louisbourg Portraits received Canada's leading nonfiction prize, the Governor-General's Literary Award for nonfiction, for 1982. The book featured in interviews of Moore by Peter Gzowski on CBC Radio's Morningside in September 1982. "From its first day, the show promoted Canadian writing," writes R.B. Fleming in Peter Gzowski: A Biography. "During Peter's first week, one of his guests was Christopher Moore, who discussed his new book Louisbourg Portraits which almost instantly became a Canadian bestseller." An ebook version was published in 2011.

The Loyalists: Revolution, Exile, Settlement, published in 1984 to coincide with the two-hundredth anniversary of loyalist settlement in Canada, mixes biographies of prominent and obscure individuals with a broad narrative of the loyalist experience. It received the Secretary of State's Prize for Excellence in Canadian Studies in 1985.

1867: How the Fathers Made A Deal, was born in the national debate over the Meech Lake Accord and Charlottetown Accord constitutional reform proposals. It was "the first detailed examination of Canadian confederation in a generation." It combines Moore's characteristic biographical focus with a new emphasis on political over social history. Moore argues that the constitutional processes of the 1860s compare well against the executive-driven deals that failed in the 1980s and 1990s due to a greater inclusion of opposing voices in the Confederation debates. He outlines the principles of Responsible Government laid out by William Warren Baldwin, Joseph Howe, Louis Hippolyte Lafontaine and Robert Baldwin which inspired Macdonald, Cartier, McGee, and the Fathers as they framed the constitution. Canadian political commentator Dalton Camp called 1867 "just about the best book on our history I've ever read." In 2011, 1867 was named one of the twelve best Canadian political books of the previous twenty-five years and published as an ebook.

In 2015, with the 150th anniversary of confederation approaching, Moore published Three Weeks in Quebec City: The Meeting that Made Canada, a closely detailed account of the Quebec Conference of 1864. At Quebec the essence of the Canadian constitution—and Canadian nationhood—was negotiated and laid out in 72 Resolutions. These became the basis of the British North America Act 1867 and remain central to Canada's constitution. Three Weeks ranges from the parties, dinners, and flirtations surrounding the conference to close analysis of the constitutional decisions made, the reasons for them, and who drove them. During 2017 Moore visited universities across the country to deliver his Canada 150 lecture "A Living Tree? Canada's Constitution 150 Years Ago -- and Today."

== Collaborative works ==
Moore has contributed essays or other work to several multi-authored historical works:

- The Illustrated History of Canada, edited by Craig Brown, a bestseller and a standard reference text in Canadian history.
- Story of A Nation, edited by Rudyard Griffiths.
- Canada: Our Century with Mark Kingwell and Sarah Borins.
- 101 Things Canadians Should Know about Canada, edited by Rudyard Griffiths.
- 100 Photos that Changed Canada, edited by Mark Reid.
- 100 Days that Changed Canada, edited by Mark Reid.
- Canada's Great War Album, edited by Mark Reid

== Children's history books ==
Though primarily a writer for adults, Moore has written several historical works for young readers.

- The Story of Canada, co-authored with Janet Lunn and illustrated by Alan Daniel is a history of Canada for young readers. It won the Mister Christie Prize in 1993 and was named one of the ten best Canadian children's books of the twentieth century by Quill and Quire magazine. "The Story of Canada" is now published in a revised edition by Scholastic Canada (fall 2016),
- From Then To Now: A Short History of the World won Moore's second Governor General's Literary Award, this time for Children's Literature (text).
- Champlain an illustrated biography of the founder of New France and his contacts with the indigenous nations of eastern North America.
- The Big Book of Canada: Exploring the Provinces and Territories. provides essential data and lively information about geographical features, notable places, historical events and special people in each of the provinces and territories. "The Big Book of Canada" has been widely used in elementary and secondary schools since 2002. In 2017 it appears in a new, fully updated and redesigned edition.

== Historical consultant ==
As a historian in private practice, Moore often undertakes commissioned research and writing for organizations, institutions, and companies on historical matters. He has worked with or advised the Canadian Broadcasting Corporation, the National Film Board, Parks Canada, the Royal Ontario Museum, the Canadian War Museum, the Historica-Dominion Institute, and many filmmakers, educational institutions, and publishers.

== Legal history ==
In 1994 Moore was commissioned by the Law Society of Upper Canada to write its bicentennial history. Since then he has written the history of a leading law firm, McCarthy Tétrault, of the British Columbia Court of Appeal, and of the Court of Appeal for Ontario. From 1998 to 2011 he wrote a column on legal history for the Toronto-based legal tabloid Law Times.

- The Law Society of Upper Canada and Ontario's Lawyers 1797–1997.
- McCarthy Tétrault 1855–2005: Building Canada's Premier Law Firm.
- The British Columbia Court of Appeal: The First Hundred Years.
- The Court of Appeal For Ontario: Defining the Right of Appeal 1792-2013.

== Journalism and essays ==
Since 1991 Moore's column "Christopher Moore" on Canadian historical issues, personalities, and controversies has appeared in every issue of Canada's leading historical magazine, The Beaver, renamed Canada's History in 2010. He has also written for Canadian Geographic, the National Post, the New York Times, and other periodicals, and he frequently contributes essays on politics, history and culture to the Literary Review of Canada. He has made many radio documentaries on historical subjects for CBC Radio's “Ideas.”. Moore has been nominated for three National Magazine Awards

== Parliamentary democracy ==
After the publication of 1867: How the Fathers Made a Deal in 1997, Moore began publishing political commentaries on parliamentary democracy in Canada. His common theme has been the lack of accountability in Canadian political leadership. Moore relates this failing to the practice (traditionally rare among parliamentary democracies worldwide) of entrusting political party leadership selection to extra-parliamentary leadership contests in which thousands of party membership holders participate. Moore argues this process means Canadian party leaders, once selected, are in practice accountable to nobody, least of all to the elected Members of Parliament, a situation leading to the breakdown in parliamentary accountability often referred to in Canada as the "democratic deficit" or the "friendly dictatorship."

Moore's argument remains a minority view, although the 2014 Reform Act introduced in the House of Commons by Michael Chong MP has attempted to increase leaders' accountability to the parliamentary caucus." All Canadian political parties remain committed to extra-parliamentary leadership selection. Most commentators accept that making Canadian leaders accountable to members of parliament is, as prominent political scientist Donald Savoie has said, "unthinkable."

== Cultural politics ==
Long active in the Writers' Union of Canada, Moore served as national chair in 1999–2000. From 2001 to 2007, he represented creators on the board of Access Copyright, Canadian Copyright Licensing Agency. A supporter of collective licensing of copyright, he has been a critic of Access Copyright's failure to represent creators' interests fully and effectively. In 2011 he was re-elected to a one-year term on the national council of the Writers' Union.
