= John F. Hayes (writer) =

Canadian writer

- Born: John Francis Hayes; August 5, 1904
- Died: November 1980 (aged 76)
- Occupation: Writer
- Writing career
- Genres: Children's literature, historical fiction
- Notable awards: Governor General's Award for Juvenile Fiction (1951, 1953); CLA Children's Book of the Year Award (1959); Vicky Metcalf Award (1964)

John Francis Hayes (August 5, 1904 – November 1980) was a Canadian writer. He is known best for ten children's historical novels. Among them, A Land Divided and Rebels Ride at Night won the Governor General's Award for Juvenile Fiction as the year's best Canadian works of 1951 and 1953. Another, The Dangerous Cove (1957), won the Canada Library Association Book of the Year for Children Award in 1959. For his body of work he was named the second recipient of the Vicky Metcalf Award, in 1964.

== Life ==
Hayes was educated in Winnipeg, Manitoba. He took courses in advertising and writing and in 1930 entered the publishing business. By the mid-1950s he was Vice-President and General Manager of Southam Press Montreal, and Director of the Southam Company Limited.

In 1954 he was elected secretary of the Canadian Authors' Association.

== Published books ==
=== Novels ===
All ten novels are historical fiction originally published by Copp Clark Publishing Company. The first nine were illustrated by Fred J. Finley, the last by J. Merle Smith.

- Buckskin Colonist: A Story of the Selkirk Settlers (1947)
- Treason at York (1949)
- A Land Divided (1951) – Governor General's Award for Juvenile Fiction
- Rebels Ride at Night (1953) – Governor General's Award
- Bugles in the Hills: A Story of the Mounties' First Days (1955)
- The Dangerous Cove: A Story of the Early Days in Newfoundland (1957)
- Quest in the Cariboo (1960)
- Flaming Prairie (1965)
- The Steel Ribbon (1967)
- On Loyalist Trails (1971)

=== Shorter fiction ===
- Canadian Christmas (1962)
- The Atlas Christmas Anthology of Canadian Stories 1963 (1963)
- The Atlas Christmas Anthology of Canadian Stories 1964 (1964)
- The Atlas Christmas Anthology of Canadian Stories 1965 (1965)
- The Atlas Christmas Anthology of Canadian Stories 1966 (1966)
- The Atlas Christmas Anthology of Canadian Stories 1968 (1968)
- The Atlas Christmas Anthology of Canadian Stories 1969 (1969)

=== Non-fiction ===
- The Challenge of Change: 50 years, 1912–1962 (1963)
- Rosedale United Church: 1914–1964 (1964)
- The Mapping of Early Canada (1967)
- The Nation Builders (1968)
- Wilderness Mission: The Story of Sainte-Marie-among-the-Hurons (1969)
