= 5 to 1 =

2015 novel by Holly Bodger

- Cover of the first edition
- Author: Holly Bodger
- Cover artist: Jennifer Heuer
- Language: English
- Genre: Dystopian young adult fiction
- Publisher: Alfred A. Knopf
- Publication date: 12 May 2015
- Publication place: New York
- Pages: 256
- ISBN: 978-0-385-39153-5
- Website: hollybodger.com/books/

5 to 1 is a dystopian young adult novel by Holly Bodger. Her debut novel, it was published on 12 May 2015 by Alfred A. Knopf. The novel is set in 2052 in a fictional country located in Southern India that formed after the Indian government adopted a one-child policy, leading to women outnumbering men by a ratio of five to one. It tells the stories of two 17-year-old characters: Sudasa, a girl who is to select her husband, in verse, and Kiran, a boy competing to marry Sudasa, in prose. The book received generally positive reviews.

== Plot ==
The story is set in 2052 in the fictional country of Koyanagar (located in Southern India). In the mid-21st-century, the Indian government adopts a version of China's one-child policy; as a result, by the time of the story, women outnumber men by five to one in Koyangar. The nation is ruled by a matriarchy that requires teenage boys to compete to be the mates of teenage girls through a series of tests. Through verse, the novel tells the story of the female participant in the competition: Sudasa, a 17-year-old girl who is being pressured to choose her cousin. In prose, the novel tells the story of Kiran, a 17-year-old boy who wants to help Sudasa.

== Critical reception ==
Michelle Monkou praised the novel in USA Today, writing: "5 to 1 is a visual and intriguing masterpiece that opens the imagination and never leaves even after the book is closed." The children's literature professor Michelle Superle highly recommended the book. She wrote that its "greatest strength" was its depiction of the characters' internal thought processes. She said that a minor weakness of the novel is its structure's similarity to other dystopian series, like The Hunger Games. Chesley Philpot, writing in The Boston Globe, called the novel "provocative" and said that it "thankfully ... doesn't devolve into a commonplace story of star-crossed lovers". Eden Grey in the School Library Journal praised the prose as "captivating in its authenticity" and said that the verse is "appropriately jarring and nuanced". She called 5 to 1 "an engaging dystopian novel ... that poignantly explores gender politics". Shannon Ozirny in The Globe and Mail wrote that while the story was low-stakes and "leans too heavily on the hook of its gender divide premise", "there is certainly enough here for teens who like their romance served with a side of societal collapse". In 2016, 5 to 1 was nominated for the Amy Mathers Teen Book Award and the Compton Crook Award.
