= Marjorie Wilkins Campbell =

Canadian writer (1901–1986)

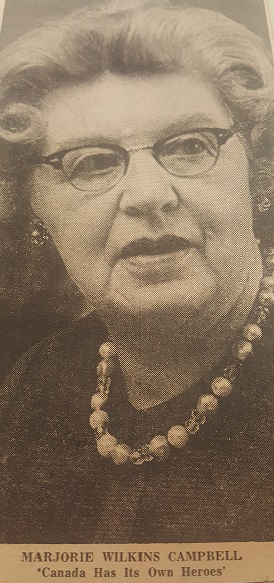
"Toronto Author Takes To Canoe To Research Simon Fraser Book", Winnipeg Free Press. Sept. 30, 1966. by Cynthia Gunn.

Marjorie Elliott Wilkins Campbell (1901 – November 23, 1986) was a Canadian writer of history and historical fiction. She won two Governor General's Literary Awards for the best works of the year, one of the two 1950 non-fiction awards for The Saskatchewan and the Governor General's Award for Juvenile Fiction in 1954 for The Nor'Westers.

== Life ==
Marjorie Elliott Wilkins was born in London, England, to Mary Eleanor Elliott and William Herbert Wilkins. They emigrated to the Qu'Appelle Valley in Saskatchewan in 1904. Marjorie was educated in Swift Current and Toronto. She married Angus Campbell, a surgeon, in 1931 and continued to work as a writer and editor.

Marjorie Wilkins Campbell began writing in high school for the Swift Current Collegiate Clarion. Prior to publishing novels and biographies focused on Canadian history and exploration, Campbell spent many years as a freelancer and eventually became the editor of Magazine Digest in Montreal and Women's editor of Canadian Magazine. In addition, Campbell published numerous articles in Chatelaine, Saturday Night, and Maclean's.

In 1966, Wilkins Campbell spent nearly four months conducting research in British Columbia where she was familiarizing herself with the Fraser River and its surrounding areas, preparing to write a book on explorer; Simon Fraser.

In previous years, Wilkins Campbell traveled to various cities throughout North America, Europe, and the U.K. researching material for her book, No Compromise, which was published in 1965.

Campbell won multiple awards including a $1,000 Canada Council grant and a Guggenheim Fellowship (1959) in the amount of $4,500 towards research for a book on fur trader William McGillivray.

She served as a consultant for the Ontario Government regarding the restoration of Fort William between 1971 and 1976. Campbell was also a named a Member of the Order of Canada in 1978.

Campbell's final book, a recollection of her mother titled The Silent Song of Mary Eleanor, was published in 1983. She died in Toronto at the Grace Hospital on November 22, 1986 of lung cancer.

== Works ==
- The Soil Is Not Enough (1938)
- The Saskatchewan (1950)
- Ontario (1953)
- The Nor' Westers: The Fight for the Fur Trade (1954)
- The North West Company (Macmillan Co. of Canada, 1957)
- The Face of Canada (1959)
- McGillivray Lord of the Northwest (Clarke, Irwin & Co., 1962)
- No Compromise: The Story of Colonel Baker and the CNIB (1965)
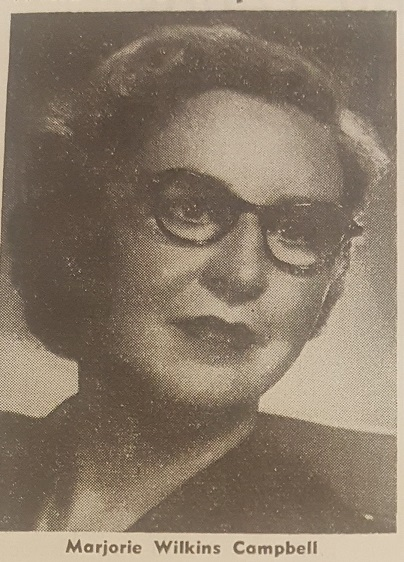
- "Wins Fellowship", Canadian Women's Press Club (Date unknown) page 7.
  Push for the Pacific (1968)
- The Savage River: Seventy One Days with Simon Fraser (1968)
- The Fur Trade (1968)
- 54-40 or Fight! (1973)
- Northwest to the Sea: A Biography of William McGillivray (Clarke, Irwin & Co., 1975). This is a revised version of her biography of McGillivray published in 1962.
- The Silent Song of Mary Eleanor (1983)
