= Zoulfa Katouh =

Canadian writer

Zoulfa Katouh (born March 29, 1994) is a Canadian author of young adult fiction. Her debut novel, As Long As The Lemon Trees Grow, was published in 2022.

== Life and career ==
Katouh was born on March 29, 1994, in Calgary, Canada, but was raised between Dubai and Switzerland, where she has completed her master's degree in drug sciences. She is of Syrian descent.

Her debut novel, As Long As The Lemon Trees Grow, was the first book by a Syrian author to be published by Bloomsbury Publishing and Little, Brown Books for Young Readers. She began writing it in 2017. It was published in September 2022 in both the United States and the United Kingdom. It was a finalist for the 2023 Governor General's Awards, an annual Canadian collection of recognition of distinction in various fields. She is the winner of the Amy Mathers Teen Book Award 2023 and was nominated for the Carnegie Medal (literary award), Yoto Carnegie Medal for Writing 2024. Her debut novel has been translated into twenty-three languages.

== Personal life ==
Katouh is a fan of BTS, Taylor Swift, Hayao Miyazaki, and Cinnabon. Her admiration for Miyazaki's art is reflected in the main protagonist of As Long As The Lemon Trees Grow, Salama, who imagines herself living in fantasies inspired by her favourite Studio Ghibli films as a means of escapism to cope with the harsh reality of the war around her.

Katouh last visited Syria in 2010, one year before the Syrian civil war, during which As Long As The Lemon Trees Grow is set.
