= Danielle Younge-Ullman =

Canadian author

Danielle Younge-Ullman is a Canadian author. She is the author of Everything Beautiful Is Not Ruined. Everything Beautiful Is Not Ruined was nominated for the 2018 White Pine Award and won. Everything Beautiful Is Not Ruined was a finalist for the 2017 Governor General Literary Award for Young People's Literature. She is also the author of He Must Like You.
