= The Sky Is Falling (Pearson novel) =

1989 young adult novel by Kit Pearson

The Sky is Falling
- First edition cover
- Author: Kit Pearson
- Cover artist: Lisa Jager Lapointe
- Language: English
- Series: The Guests of War Trilogy
- Genre: Young adult novel
- Publisher: Penguin Canada
- Publication date: 1989
- Publication place: Canada
- Pages: 246 pp
- Followed by: Looking at the Moon

The Sky is Falling is a 1989 young adult novel by Kit Pearson. It is the first novel in the Guests of War trilogy, which follows the lives of Norah and Gavin Stoakes after they are evacuated from England to Canada during World War II.

The novel won the Canadian Library Association Book of the Year Award for Children and the Geoffrey Bilson Award (for best Canadian work of historical fiction written for youth).

== Plot summary ==
Norah and Gavin Stoakes live in a peaceful English village until World War II causes them to be evacuated to Toronto. Norah, an independent ten-year-old, is angry with the evacuation and resents having to care for Gavin. Five-year-old Gavin does not understand the evacuation and is confused and frightened. When they arrive in Canada, Norah and Gavin are placed with Florence Ogilvie, a bossy and cold widow and her timid spinster daughter, Mary Ogilvie. The Ogilvies only wanted Gavin but were convinced to take Norah as well. Norah is acutely aware of their preference toward Gavin, rather than her. While Gavin quickly settles into his new home where he is spoilt and coddled by Mrs. Ogilvie, Norah cannot settle. She dislikes Mrs. Ogilvie, is bored in her strict new home, is unpopular at her new school, begins to wet the bed (something she was very angry at Gavin for doing on the boat trip there), and constantly worries about what is happening to her family in England.

As weeks go by, Norah’s resentment of Mrs. Ogilvie increases. Although she begins to make new friends, her misery increases as she realizes she cannot return to England for much longer than she was originally told. After Mrs. Ogilvie and Norah have an argument, Norah decides to run away and return to England on her own. She originally leaves without Gavin but decides she cannot leave him to be spoilt by Mrs. Ogilvie in a foreign country. She takes him with her but they only get as far as the train station before Norah realizes her plan is impossible. They return to the Ogilvies, expecting punishment but find that Mrs. Ogilvie and Miss Ogilvie have been very worried. Mrs. Ogilvie apologizes for ignoring Norah in the past months and asks if they can begin again. Norah accepts the offer and attempts to try to live happily in Canada. Life begins to improve and Norah accepts Canada as her temporary home for the duration of the war.

== Title meaning ==
The title of The Sky is Falling comes from a child's misinterpretation of the Blitz. Early in the novel, Norah and Gavin are listening to stories with other evacuees. The group hears the story of The Sky is Falling (Chicken Little), about a chicken who believed the sky was falling. A young evacuee states that is what was happening in England.
