= Awake and Dreaming =

1996 novel by Kit Pearson

- Author: Kit Pearson
- Language: English
- Genre: Children's novel
- Publisher: Viking Canada
- Publication date: 1996
- Publication place: Canada
- Pages: 240
- Award: Ruth Schwartz Children's Book Award (1997)
- ISBN: 978-0-670-86954-1

Awake and Dreaming is a children's novel by Canadian author Kit Pearson and illustrator Margot Zemach. It was first published in 1996. The book follows an impoverished, introverted nine-year-old girl named Theo Caffrey, who dreams of living with a "real" family. The novel won the 1997 Ruth Schwartz Children's Book Award.

== Plot summary ==
Theodora ("Theo") is an avid reader who lives in the slums of Vancouver with her young mother Mary-Rae, who is irresponsible and frequently mistreats Theo. She often fantasizes about an alternate life, her dreams fueled by the huge quantity of books she reads about perfect families.

Rae starts dating a man named Cal, and eventually moves in with him, sending Theo to live with her aunt, Rae's sister Sharon, in Victoria. While she and her mother are on the ferry to Victoria, Theo meets a "perfect" family, by the name of the Kaldors. She and the Kaldor children instantly make friends and play together on the ferry. Theo and the children see a new moon while on the ferry and each make a wish. Theo desperately wishes she belonged to the Kaldor family and then faints. Theo wakes up mysteriously and inexplicably living with the Kaldors.

Theo originally believes there must be a mistake, but is delighted to find that the Kaldors simply accept her as a member of the family. Theo quickly begins to believe that as long as she remains with the Kaldors, nothing will ever go wrong again. Several months pass and then suddenly, Theo's life begins to fade away - literally. Quickly after this, Theo wakes up and finds herself back on the ferry with her mother, at the exact moment she left, much to her unhappiness. She begins to live with her aunt Sharon, but she cannot enjoy it as she keeps wondering if the Kaldors were real or just a dream.

Theo eventually discovers that the Kaldors do exist, but is instantly disappointed when they do not remember her. She befriends them, but is frustrated that they aren't "perfect" - they too have normal family issues. Theo is also frustrated that they simply view her as a friend, not as a member of the family.

Meanwhile, Theo discovers a shadowy presence in the Kaldor's house - the restless spirit of a dead author, Cecily Stone. Cecily lived in the house her entire life and remains there while she tries to settle the past. She feels she cannot die until she has created an idea for her 'great novel' which she never wrote. Theo is stunned to find that Cecily's idea consists of Theo coming to live with the Kaldors. Cecily explains that she first saw Theo on the ferry to Victoria, imagined a better life for Theo, but her idea faded when she could not come up with a conclusive ending. It appears that Theo's longing for a family and Cecily's idea for a book came together and made Theo's dream, but when Cecily's idea faded, so did the dream.

Rae's relationship with Cal fails, so she comes to live with Sharon and Theo in Victoria. Theo begins to enjoy her real life, not just her imaginary one. This is thrown into chaos when Rae decides to go back to Vancouver, much to Sharon's refusal. Theo is so upset that she goes to Cecily for advice. Cecily sympathizes but knows there is nothing she can do, and instead gives Theo advice on how to continue with her life. Cecily now feels that she is able to move on and face the next stage of her journey - asking Theo to plant a white rose on her grave after she parts.

Theo returns home and stands up for herself, refusing to leave Victoria. She insists that Rae pull her act together and take care of her properly. Rae is stunned, but agrees. The novel skips forward several weeks to Theo's tenth birthday. She and Rae now live together in a clean and comfortable apartment. Rae has a decent job and is taking care of Theo. It appears that Theo's life is beginning to work out. She enjoys a birthday party with her friends, the Kaldors, and her family. She accepts that she doesn't know if this life will last, but she will enjoy it while she can.

== Adaption ==
The book was adapted in 2009 by Megan Mackenzie and Cassie Silva for the stage. It starred Natasha Thompson (Theo Caffrey), Katherine Ashcroft (Rae Caffrey), Sheri Eyre (Cecily Stone), Stefanie Swinnard (Sharon Caffrey), Tim Pierotti (Dan Kaldor), Glynis Cawdell (Laura Kaldor), Jamie Gourley (John Kaldor), Nicole Provost (Anna Kaldor), Nada Moorthy (Lisbeth Kaldor), Patrick Paul (Ben Kaldor), Hudson Lee (Skye), Veronia Hargrave (Swing), Levi Dahl (Swing) and Adam Scott (Swing.) The production was stage managed by Tanya Schwaerzle and assistant stage managed by Rebecca Mackenzie, Catrina Lewis and Mackenzie Lee.

== Relation to Victoria ==
One of the settings in the book, the Ross Bay Cemetery, is a real cemetery located in Victoria, BC. The house described in the book is based on an actual house in Victoria, as are many other locations that are described in the book.
