= Ozark Henry discography =

This is a discography of all releases by Belgian musician Ozark Henry.

== Studio albums ==
| Release date | Title | Peak chart position |
|---|---|---|
| 1996 | I'm Seeking Something That Has Already Found Me | — |
| 1998 | This Last Warm Solitude | — |
| 2001 | Birthmarks | 8 |
| 2004 | The Sailor Not the Sea | 3 |
| 2006 | The Soft Machine | 1 |
| 2010 | Hvelreki | 1 |
| 2013 | Stay Gold | 1 |
| 2015 | Paramount (with the National Orchestra of Belgium) | — |
| 2017 | Us | 2 |
| 2025 | August Parker | 15 |

== EPs ==
| Release date | Name album | Peak chart position |
|---|---|---|
| 2014 | I'm Your Sacrifice (Remixes) | — |

== Compilations ==
| Release date | Name album | Peak chart position |
|---|---|---|
| 2007 | A Decade + A Decade: The Remixes (double album) | — |
| 2010 | The Essential Singles, 1996–2006 (double album) | — |

== Live albums ==
| Release date | Name album | Peak chart position |
|---|---|---|
| 2005 | Live @ Pukkelpop 20.8.05 | — |
| 2007 | Easter Sunday - Live at the Ancienne Belgique - Brussels (2005) | — |
| 2008 | Grace | — |
| 2014 | Live 2014: The Journey's Everything | — |
| 2018 | Live 2018: Ronse Opscène 25.08.18 | — |

== Soundtracks ==
| Release date | Name album | Peak chart position | Notes |
|---|---|---|---|
| 1999 | Engeltjes | — | television series |
| 2002 | Sedes & Belli: The Music | 27 | |
| 2005 | Dag opa | — | short film |
| 2006 | Crusade in Jeans | — | |
| 2007 | To Walk Again | — | documentary |
| 2012 | Le Monde Nous Appartient | — | |
| 2014 | Le Chant De La Fleur | — | |

== DVDs ==
| Year | Title |
|---|---|
| 2005 | Easter Sunday: Live at the Ancienne Belgique, Brussels |
| 2008 | Ecotone |

== Singles ==
| Year | Title |
|---|---|
| 2011 | "It's in the Air Tonight" |
| 2014 | "I'm Your Sacrifice" |
| 2017 | "A Dream That Never Stops" |
| 2017 | "Where Is the Love" |
| 2020 | "We Will Meet Again" |

== Sunzoo Manley ==
| Year | Title |
|---|---|
| 2001 | To All Our Escapes |

== As producer ==
| Year | Title |
|---|---|
| 2004 | Another Lonely Soul (Novastar) |
