= Kim-Lian =

Dutch singer and actress (born 1980)

Kim-lian
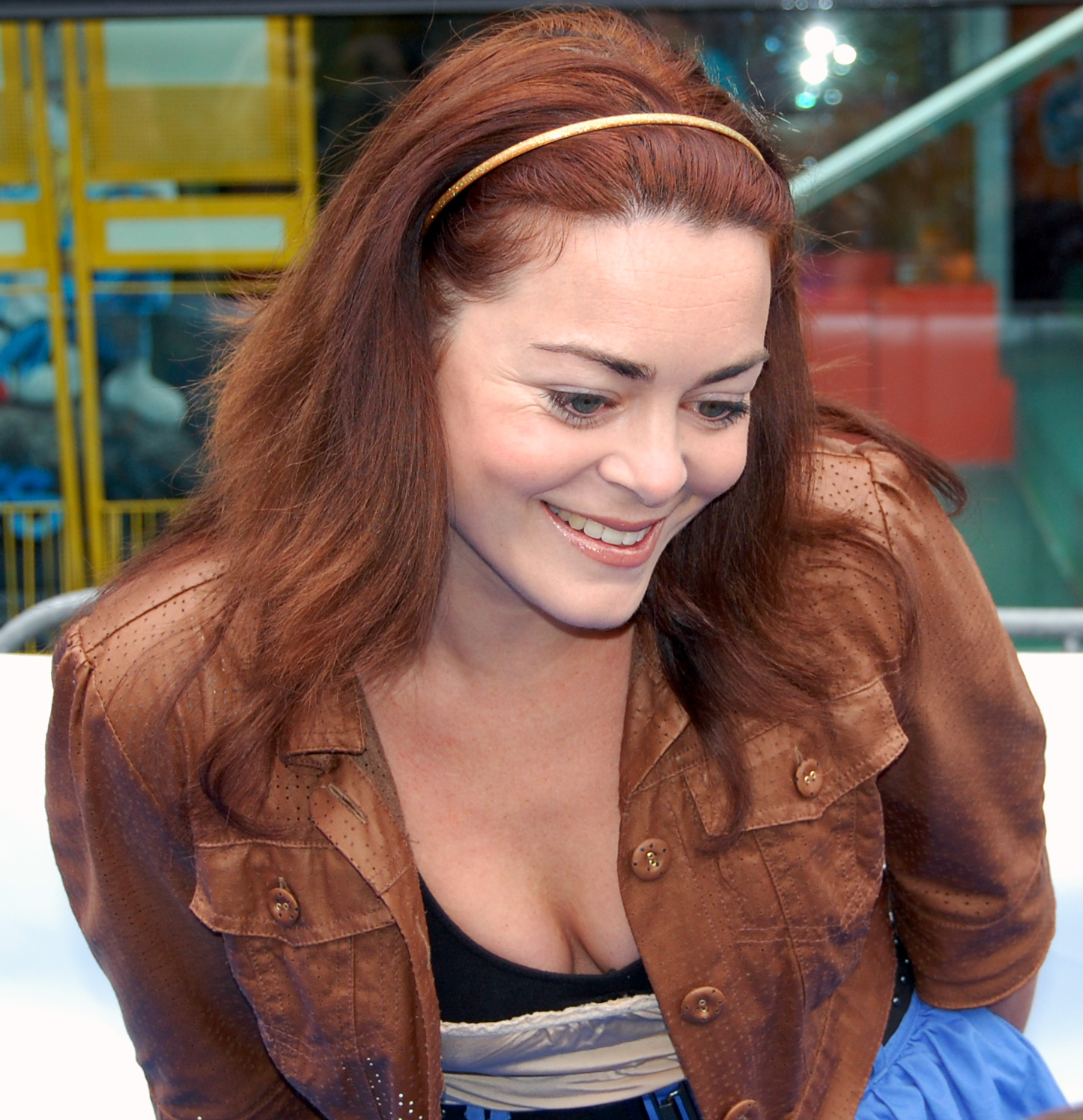

Background information
- Born: Kim-Lian van der Meij; 1 October 1980 (age 45); Beverwijk, Netherlands
- Genres: Pop rock
- Occupations: Singer-songwriter, actress, tv presenter
- Instrument: Singing
- Years active: 2003–present
- Labels: CMM Records (2003–2005, 2009–present); Bass Commander Records (2006–2009)
- Website: kim-lian.nl

Kim-Lian van der Meij (born 1 October 1980 in Beverwijk) is a Dutch musical actress, presenter and a singer-songwriter.

== Biography ==
Kim-Lian comes from a musical family. Both her parents were professional dancers. Kim-Lian won a number of dance contests in her childhood and regularly competed in lip-sync shows. She competed in the Dutch TV programme "De Mini Playbackshow" (similar to Stars in Their Eyes Kids) twice, once at the age of 6 and once when she was 11.

When she turned 16 she was signed at several castings and model agencies. She was soon asked to play minor roles in Dutch TV programs such as Goede Tijden Slechte Tijden, Kees & Co and more. After screentesting for the Veronica TV channel she was a hostess of CallTV. From 2001 to 2002 she hosted Puzzeltijd (Puzzletime).

After she quit Puzzeltijd Kim-Lian retreated from publicity. But in 2003 she was asked to host the Kids Top 20 for the children network Jetix. This TV program had audiences of 200,000 children every week. For this program she won the highest award in the Netherlands for a children program: the Gouden Stuiver (The Golden Nickel).

She ended up hosting the award-show in 2013.

== Music career ==
=== 2003–2005: Balance ===
In 2003 she got the chance by CMM Records to record an album. At the end of 2003 the first single "Teenage Superstar" was released. Teenage Superstar became a No. 1 hit in Indonesia and charted in the Netherlands, Belgium, South Africa, Malaysia, Singapore, Sweden and Italy.

After "Hey Boy!" was released (which also did well in all the charts), Kim-Lian's debut album Balance was released, which peaked at No. 9 in the Dutch Album Chart.

The third single "Garden of Love" was released to show a more mature side of Kim. Although she was promoted as a children artist, this song had serious lyrics. "Garden of Love" made it into the Top 40 in the Netherlands.

The last single that was released off the album was a cover of Kim Wilde's song "Kids in America". The song became another top 10 hit for Kim in the Netherlands.

At the end of 2004 Kim-Lian released a DVD called Balance: The Experience. The DVD contains the music videos and live performances.

Because they were so impressed with her performance, she was asked to join the presenters cast of Top of the Pops from BBC.

=== 2006: Just Do It ===
After splitting up with her record label CMM Records, because Kim-Lian refused to sing more children music, she worked on her second album. She wanted to produce it herself and was helped by the Swedish producer (and partner) Daniël Gibson. They built a studio at their home and started to write songs. They wrote with several writers from different countries, such as Sweden, England, the Netherlands and Belgium.

The first single of Just Do It was "Road to Heaven", it peaked at No. 28 in the Top 40.

On 12 October, she released "In Vain", the second single off the upcoming second album Just Do It. After spending 6 weeks in the Tipparade (Dutch pre-chart) it was expected to chart in the Dutch Top 40 next week. But it did not enter.

Kim-lian had got plans to go abroad with her second and last album to date but it was never confirmed. She went on to record one-off singles, and film-soundtracks.

== Musicals ==
In 1994 Kim-lian played in the musical Kruistocht in Spijkerbroek (Crusade in Jeans), based on the children-novel of Thea Beckman. During the first season of the Kids Top 20, Kim-Lian played a role in the musical Home. At the end of 2003 she played in the musical Kunt u mij de weg naar Hamelen vertellen, mijnheer? (Can you tell me the road to Hamelen, sir?). In 2005 Kim-Lian played the role of De Kleine Zeemeermin (Little Mermaid) along with Belgian singer Kathleen Aerts. In 2007 she starred in the musical Doe Maar which was based on the experiences of the Dutch band by the same name). This was followed by appearances in adaptations of Fame, Footloose, Legally Blonde and Shrek.

== Cartoons ==
Kim-Lian provided the Dutch voice of Smurfette in The Smurfs and The Smurfs 2; she also voiced Rapunzel in the movie of the same name.

== Personal life ==
Kim-Lian is married to Swedish producer Daniel Gibson who wrote Teenage Superstar. They have a daughter and two sons. She has Indonesian roots through her father, whose mother is Chinese-Indonesian and had a Dutch father who was stationed as a KNIL soldier in the Dutch East Indies.

Year	Title	Role
1994	Kruistocht in Spijkerbroek	?
2003	Home	Motje
2004	Kunt u mij de weg naar Hamelen vertellen, meneer?	Prinses Madelein
2005	De Kleine Zeemeermin	Little Mermaid
2007	Doe Maar	Janis
2008	Fame	Carmen Diaz
2009	Footloose	Ariel Moore
2010–2011	Legally Blonde	Elle Woods
2011–2012	Daddy Cool	Roos
2012–2013	Shrek	Princes Fiona

== Discography ==
=== Albums ===
Year	Album	Chart positions	
Year	Album	NL	BE
2004	Balance: 1st studio album; Released: 24 May 2004; Format: CD	9	
2006	Just Do It: 2nd studio album; Released: 28 October 2006; Format: CD+DVD	-	-
2022	The Best Of: 1st compilation album; Released: 01 February 2022; Format: Streaming+Digital Download	-	-

=== Singles ===
Year	Single	Chart positions						Album
Year	Single	NL	IND	BEL	SWE	DEN	TUR	Album
2003	"Teenage Superstar"	4	1	24	26	-	-	Balance
2004	"Hey Boy!"	6	-	48	-	-	-	Balance
2004	"Garden of Love"	19	-	-	-	-	-	Balance
2004	"Kids in America"	15	-	50	-	-	-	Balance
2006	"Road to Heaven"	28	-	-	-	-	-	Just Do It
2006	"In Vain"	33	-	-	-	-	-	Just Do It
2007	"Feel" (digital single)	-	-	-	-	-	-	Just Do It
2009	"Not That Kinda Girl" (with Linda Bengtzing)	32	-	-	-	-	13	
2009	"Gemengde Gevoelens" (with Fouradi)	17	-	-	-	-	-	
2010	"How I Like It" (with The Future presidents)	-	-	-	15	15	-	
2012	"Break the Ice"	-	-	-	-	-	-	

== Filmography ==
Apart from doing musicals she also acts in some TV-programs.

Year	Title	Role
2002	Costa	Greetje
2002	Bonbini Beach	?
2002	Kees & Co	?
2005	Chicken Little	Malle Abby (voice-only) - Dutch version
2006	Super Robot Monkey Team Hyperforce Go!	Nova (voice-only) - Dutch version

=== Television ===
These are the TV-programs she hosted.

Year	Title
2000–2002	Call TV
2003–2005	Jetix Planet Live Ahoy
2005	Christmas Jumbo Gala XL
2005	Co-Host Top of the Pops (British Version)
2003–2006	Kids Top 20
2006–present	Nationaal Kids TV
2007	Junior Eurovision Song Contest 2007
2012	Junior Eurovision Song Contest 2012

== Awards and nominations ==
Award	Category	About	Result
2003 till 2012
Nickelodeon Kids Award	Best Female Singer	Herself	Won
John Kraaijkamp Musical Award	Best Leading Female Role	De Kleine Zeemeermin	Nominated
John Kraaijkamp Musical Award	Upcoming Talent	Kunt U Mij De Weg Naar Hamelen Vertellen, Meneer?	Nominated
De Televizier Ring	De Gouden Stuiver (The Golden Nickel) Best Children Program	Kids Top 20	Won
Rembrandt Award	Best Film Song	Achtste Groepers Huilen Niet	nominated
