= In Vain =

In Vain may refer to:

- "In Vain" (Kim-Lian song)
- In Vain (Within Temptation song)
- In Vain (band), a Norwegian band
- in vain (Haas), a composition by Georg Friedrich Haas
- An EP by the German band Rage
