= Dear Canada =

Children's book series

Dear Canada is a series of historical novels for children, published by Scholastic Canada and popular in school libraries and classrooms. Each text explores significant events in Canadian history through the eyes of a female child. First published in 2001, they are similar to the Dear America series. The series covers both familiar and little-known topics such as Home Children, the North-West Rebellion, the 1837 Rebellion, and the Ukrainian Canadian internment.

== Books ==
- Orphan at My Door: The Home Child Diary of Victoria Cope, Guelph, Ontario, 1897 by Jean Little (2001)
- A Prairie as Wide as the Sea: The Immigrant Diary of Ivy Weatherall, Milorie, Saskatchewan, 1926 by Sarah Ellis (2001)
- With Nothing But Our Courage: The Loyalist Diary of Mary MacDonald, Johnstown, Quebec, 1783 by Karleen Bradford (2002)
- Footsteps in the Snow: The Red River Diary of Isobel Scott, Rupert's Land, 1815 by Carol Matas (2002)
- A Ribbon of Shining Steel: The Railway Diary of Kate Cameron, Yale, British Columbia, 1882 by Julie Lawson (2002)
- Whispers of War: The War of 1812 Diary of Susanna Meritt, Niagara, Upper Canada, 1812 by Kit Pearson (2002)
- Alone in an Untamed Land: The Filles du Roi Diary of Helene St. Onge, Montreal, New France, 1666 by Maxine Trottier (2003)
- Brothers Far from Home: The World War I Diary of Eliza Bates, Uxbridge, Ontario, 1916 by Jean Little (2003)
- An Ocean Apart: The Gold Mountain Diary of Chin Mei-ling, Vancouver, British Columbia, 1922 by Gillian Chan (2004)
- A Trail of Broken Dreams: The Gold Rush Diary of Harriet Palmer, Overland to the Cariboo, 1862 by Barbara Haworth-Attard (2004)
- Banished from Our Home: The Acadian Diary of Angelique Richard, Grand-Pre, Acadia, 1755 by Sharon Stewart (2004)
- Winter of Peril: The Newfoundland Diary of Sophie Loveridge, Mairie's Cove, New-Found-Land, 1721 by Jan Andrews (2005)
- Turned Away: The World War II Diary of Devorah Bernstein, Winnipeg, Manitoba, 1941 by Carol Matas (2005)
- The Death of My Country: The Plains of Abraham Diary of Genevieve Aubuchon, Quebec, New France, 1759 by Maxine Trottier (2005)
- No Safe Harbour: The Halifax Explosion Diary of Charlotte Blackburn, Halifax, Nova Scotia, 1917 by Julie Lawson (2006)
- A Rebel's Daughter: The 1837 Rebellion Diary of Arabella Stevenson, Toronto, Upper Canada, 1837 by Janet Lunn (2006)
- A Season for Miracles: Twelve Tales of Christmas by Jean Little, Janet Lunn, Sarah Ellis, Kit Pearson, Gillian Chan, Carol Matas, Maxine Trottier, Julie Lawson, Sharon Stewart, Barbara Haworth-Attard, Jan Andrews, & Karleen Bradford (2006)
- If I Die Before I Wake: The Flu Epidemic Diary of Fiona Macgregor, Toronto, Ontario, 1918 by Jean Little (2007)
- Not a Nickel to Spare: The Great Depression Diary of Sally Cohen, Toronto, Ontario, 1932 by Perry Nodelman (2007)
- Prisoners in the Promised Land: The Ukrainian Internment Diary of Anya Soloniuk, Spirit Lake, Quebec, 1914 by Marsha Forchuk Skrypuch (2007)
- Days of Toil and Tears: The Child Labour Diary of Flora Rutherford, Almonte, Ontario, 1887 by Sarah Ellis (2008)
- Where the River Takes Me: The Hudson's Bay Company Diary of Jenna Sinclair, Fort Victoria, Vancouver's Island, 1849 by Julie Lawson (2008)
- Blood Upon Our Land: The North West Resistance Diary of Josephine Bouvier, Batoche, District of Saskatchewan, 1885 by Maxine Trottier (2009)
- A Desperate Road to Freedom: The Underground Railroad Diary of Julia May Jackson, Virginia to Canada West, 1863-1864 by Karleen Bradford (2009)
- A Christmas to Remember: Tales of Comfort and Joy by Jean Little, Marsha Forchuk Skrypuch, Carol Matas, Maxine Trottier, Sarah Ellis, Julie Lawson, Perry Nodelman, & Karleen Bradford (2009)
- Exiles from the War: The War Guests Diary of Charlotte Mary Twiss, Guelph, Ontario, 1940 by Jean Little (2010)
- To Stand on My Own: The Polio Epidemic Diary of Noreen Robertson, Saskatoon, Saskatchewan, 1937 by Barbara Haworth-Attard (2010)
- Hoping for Home: Stories of Arrival by Jean Little, Kit Pearson, Brian Doyle, Paul Yee, Irene N. Watts, Ruby Slipperjack, Afua Cooper, Rukhsana Khan, Marie-Andrée Clermont, Lillian Boraks-Nemetz, & Shelley Tanaka (2011)
- That Fatal Night: The Titanic Diary of Dorothy Wilton, Halifax, Nova Scotia, 1912 by Sarah Ellis (2011)
- Torn Apart: The Internment Diary of Mary Kobayashi, Vancouver, British Columbia, 1941 by Susan Aihoshi (2012)
- A Sea of Sorrows: The Typhus Epidemic Diary of Johanna Leary, Ireland to Canada East, 1847 by Norah McClintock (2012)
- Pieces of the Past: The Holocaust Diary of Rose Rabinowitz, Winnipeg, Manitoba, 1948 by Carol Matas (2013)
- A Country of Our Own: The Confederation Diary of Rosie Dunn, Ottawa, Province of Canada, 1866 by Karleen Bradford (2013)
- All Fall Down: The Landslide Diary of Abby Roberts, Frank, District of Alberta, 1902 by Jean Little (2014)
- Flame and Ashes: The Great Fire Diary of Triffie Winsor, St. John's, Newfoundland, 1892 by Janet McNaughton (2014)
- A Time for Giving: Ten Tales of Christmas by Jean Little, Barbara Haworth-Attard, Sarah Ellis, Susan Aihoshi, Norah McClintock, Carol Matas, Karleen Bradford, & Ruby Slipperjack (2015)
- These Are My Words: The Residential School Diary of Violet Pesheens, Northern Ontario, 1966 by Ruby Slipperjack (2016)

== Companion series ==
In September 2010, Scholastic launched a similar series marketed at boys, titled I Am Canada.

== See also ==
- My Australian Story
- My Story
- My Name is America
- Royal Diaries
