= The Soft Machine (disambiguation) =

The Soft Machine is a 1961 novel by William Burroughs.

The Soft Machine may also refer to:

- Soft Machine, a British progressive rock band named for the novel
  - The Soft Machine (Soft Machine album), 1968
- Soft Machine (Teddybears album), 2006
- The Soft Machine (Ozark Henry album), 2006
