= Just Do It (disambiguation) =

Just Do It is a trademark of shoe company Nike.

Just Do It may also refer to:

- Just Do It (album) by Kim-Lian, 2006
- "Just Do It", song by Julia Michaels, from Nervous System, 2017
- "Just Do It", song by DTG and TBJZL, 2022
- "Just Do It", segment from the LaBeouf, Rönkkö & Turner video #Introductions (2015) that became an internet meme
