= Ozark Henry =

Belgian musician (born 1970)

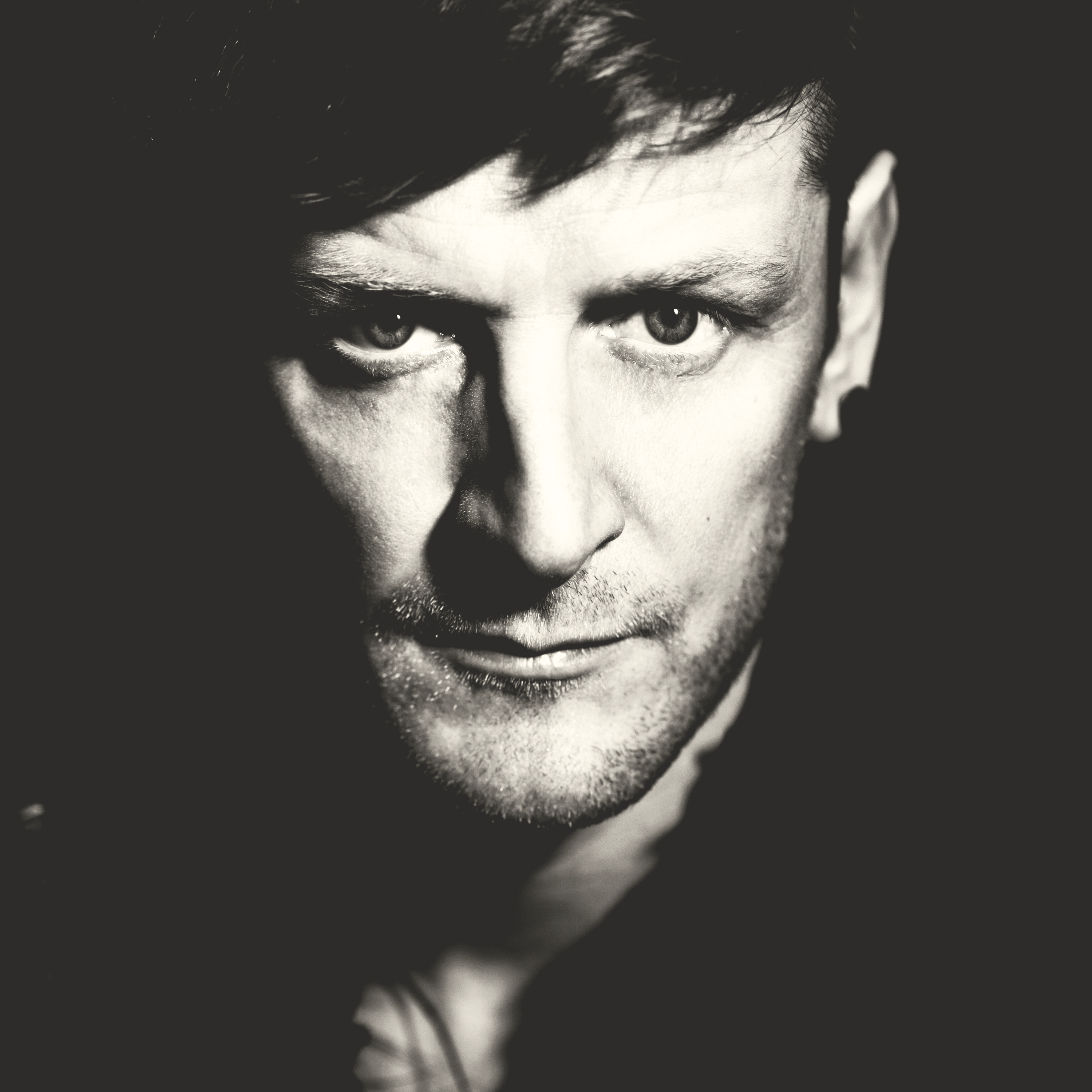
- Ozark Henry in 2020

Background information
- Born: Piet Goddaer; 29 April 1970 (age 56); Kortrijk, Belgium
- Genres: Alternative; avant-garde; pop; rock
- Occupations: Musician; record producer
- Instrument: Vocals
- Years active: 1995–present
- Label: Studio Ozark Henry
- Website: studioozarkhenry.com

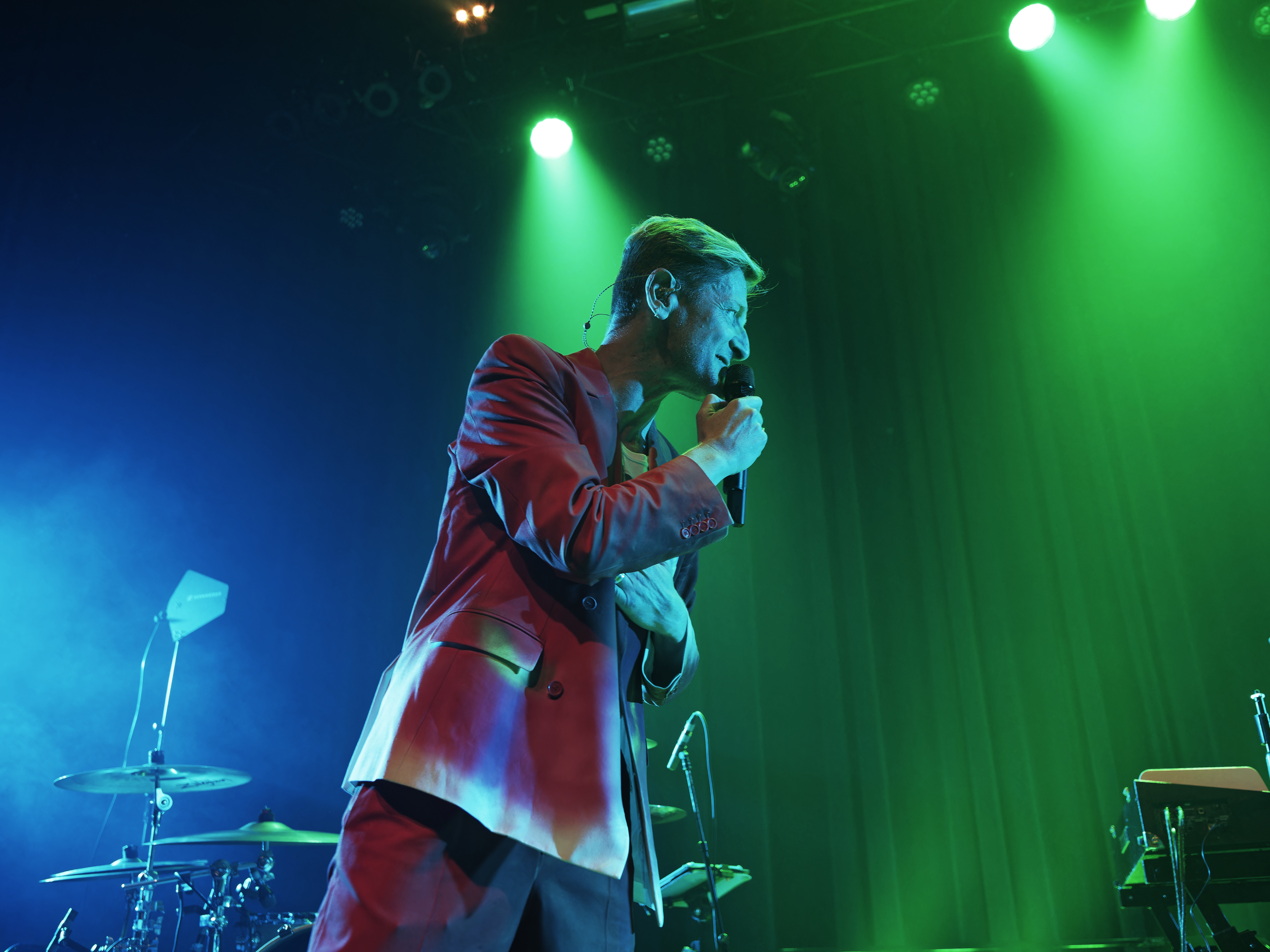
Ozark Henry performing in 2023

Piet Goddaer (born 29 April 1970 in Kortrijk) is a Belgian musician, better known by his stage name Ozark Henry. As of June 2020, he has released nine studio albums under the name Ozark Henry. In 2001, he released the album To All Our Escapes under the name Sunzoo Manley, a collaboration with Frank Deruytter.

== Background ==
Goddaer drew the inspiration for his stage name from a geographic region in the United States, the Ozark mountains, and the book Junkie by William S. Burroughs.

Ozark Henry's first album, I'm Seeking Something That Has Already Found Me, was considered avant-garde. His third album, Birthmarks, marked a transition from earlier experimental music to pop music with classical influences, such as string and wind instruments. Birthmarks and the subsequent album The Sailor Not the Sea were Henry's breakthrough with Belgian audiences. Since the album The Soft Machine (2006), his music has been characterized by a more mainstream sound.

Goddaer writes, composes, and produces his albums himself. In addition to regular studio albums, he has also released a few soundtracks, including for the film adaptation of Thea Beckman's Crusade in Jeans. He has also produced music for other artists.

== Career ==
In his early life, Goddaer was involved in several local bands. As a rapper in the band Word, founded by his brother Jan, Goddaer scored a cult hit with the song "Henry Man-She" in 1994.

His career really took off when Goddaer started a solo career and adopted the stage name Ozark Henry. The debut album I'm Seeking Something That Has already Found Me was released in 1996 with Double T Music. In an interview, David Bowie praised the album as "debut of the year", but the record had little commercial success.

His second album, This Last Warm Solitude, was released in Belgium in 1998. The next year, This Last Warm Solitude was released in the Netherlands, Germany, and France, and Henry received a Zamu Award as best songwriter/composer.

The next album, Birthmarks, was released in 2001 on Sony Music Entertainment and was the commercial breakthrough for Henry. The singles "Rescue" and "Sweet Instigator" were hits in Belgium, and the album was certified platinum. Henry won two Zamu Awards: best pop/rock and best producer. He appeared regularly on television and radio shows, including Aan tafel.

His fourth album, The Sailor not the Sea, was released in 2004, and was awarded a gold record the next year. Henry also won another Zamu Award for best songwriter/composer.

His fifth album, The Soft Machine, was released in September 2006.

For Henry's tenth anniversary, the compilation album A Decade was issued.

The sixth album, Hvelreki, was released in October 2010.

Henry also wrote the music for several theatre projects and the soundtrack of the Belgian television series Sedes & Belli, as well as Crusade in Jeans, a movie based on a children's novel by Thea Beckman. He received the Magritte Award for Best Original Score for his work in the 2012 film The World Belongs to Us.

His seventh album is Stay Gold. In 2014, Henry re-recorded "We Are Incurable Romantics", a track from this album, with Italian singer-songwriter Elisa.

In 2015, Henry released the album Paramount, which was recorded together with the National Orchestra of Belgium. In 2017, his ninth album, Us, came out.

=== Sunzoo Manley ===
In 1999, Goddaer collaborated with musician Richard Jonckheere (under the moniker LaTchak) to record the track "If This Is Love". Nothing much happened until 2001, when Goddaer began recording an album together with Frank Deruytter, Marc François, and Stephane Galland, which was released the same year under the name To All Our Escapes.

== Awards ==
- 2000: Best Writer Composer-arranger – Zamu Music Awards.
- 2001: gold record for Birthmarks.
- 2002: platinum record for Birthmarks.
- 2004: gold record for The Sailor not the Sea.
- 2004: platinum record for The Sailor not the Sea.
- 2005: double platinum record for The Sailor not the Sea.
- 2006: gold record for The Soft Machine.
- 2006: platinum record for The Soft Machine.
- 2007: gold record for the compilation A decade.
- 2010: gold record for the single "This one's for you".
- 2010: gold record for Hvelreki.
- 2010: platinum record for Hvelreki.
- 2011: won the 'MIA' for "Best Pop Artist" at the Music Industry Awards.
- 2013: Radio 2 Hit of the Summer for "I'm your sacrifice", sung together with Amaryllis Uitterlinden.
- 2013: gold record for the single "I'm your sacrifice".
- 2013: platinum record for "I'm your sacrifice".
- 2013: gold record for Stay Gold.
- 2014: platinum record for Stay Gold.

== Activism ==
United Nations Office on Drugs and Crime (UNODC) has appointed Piet Goddaer as its national goodwill ambassador against human trafficking. The appointment is aimed at increasing visibility and assisting in mobilizing support in Belgium to tackle human trafficking. Next to his work for the UNODC, Goddaer actively supports Bike For Africa.

== Discography ==
=== Studio albums ===
Year	Title
1996	I'm Seeking Something That Has Already Found Me
1998	This Last Warm Solitude
2001	Birthmarks
2004	The Sailor Not the Sea
2006	The Soft Machine
2010	Hvelreki
2013	Stay Gold
2015	Paramount (with the National Orchestra of Belgium)
2017	Us
2025	August Parker
