= Orphan at My Door =

2001 book by Jean Little

- Orphan at My Door: The Home Child Diary of Victoria Cope, Guelph, Ontario, 1897
- Author: Jean Little
- Language: English
- Series: Dear Canada
- Subject: Literature
- Genre: Historical fiction
- Publisher: Scholastic Canada Ltd.
- Publication date: September 2001
- Publication place: Canada
- Media type: Print (Hardcover)
- Pages: 221
- ISBN: 0-439-98834-9
- OCLC: 46626131
- Preceded by: A Prairie As Wide As The Sea
- Followed by: With Nothing But Our Courage

Orphan at My Door, written by Jean Little, is the second book in the Dear Canada, series of novels created by Scholastic Canada and written by various authors. The book is written in the format of a diary and features a fictional narrator, Victoria Cope.

Orphan at My Door was first printed and released in Canada in September 2001 by Scholastic Canada Ltd. Orphan at My Door available in both English and French.

== Characters ==
=== Primary Characters ===
- Victoria Cope: Victoria is main protagonist in the story. She is eleven years old and the youngest Cope child in the beginning of the book. She is usually described to be curious about Home Children, and if they are like Oliver Twist. She loves to write in her new diary and fills the entire book in less than six months. Her early entries describe ordinary events such as disliking chores, but they mature as she develops into the tragic story of Marianna and Jasper Wilson's plight. She is good friends with Marianna and often treats her more like a sister than a servant.
- Marianna Wilson: Marianna Wilson is the Cope family's Home Child from Britain. She is twelve years old at the beginning of the book and initially known as "Mary Anna". Though she is shy at the beginning of the book, she becomes more open and close to Victoria. Separated from her younger brother Jasper and infant sister Emily Rose, Marianna is deeply concerned about their whereabouts. When Jasper secretly appears at the Copes' household, Victoria and the Cope family support Marianna and Jasper in finding better conditions for Jasper. She forms a strong bond with Victoria and the rest of Cope family. Marianna assists in the delivery of Victoria's baby sister, who is named Emily Rose Cope in honour of Marianna's lost sister. She is adopted by the Cope family at the end of the book.
- Jasper Wilson: Jasper Wilson is the younger brother of Marianna Wilson. He is eight years old at the beginning at the book. After his boat trip from Britain, he is separated from his sisters and sent to a rural farm outside of Guelph. His employer, Carl Stone treats him poorly and forces Jasper to sleep in the chicken shed. He is seen hiding in the Cope's stable, very thin and ill. Since his employer's sister visits the Cope house, he runs away again and is eventually found hiding near the river by Victoria's older brother, Thomas. He too is adopted by the Copes at the end of the book.

=== Secondary Characters ===
- Lilias Cope: Lilias Cope is the wife of Dr. Alastair Cope and the Mother of the Cope Children. She is concerned at the beginning of the book about Home Children being diseased, but eventually softens her heart to them once Marianna arrives.
- Dr. Alastair Cope: Alastair Cope is a trusted Guelph doctor, the husband of Lilias Cope, and the father of the Cope children. He cures Jasper of his illness and delivers Emily Rose Cope.
- Aunt Lib: Aunt Lib is the crabby aunt of Lilias Cope and is Great-Aunt to the Cope Children. She is rude to Marianna and any home children, but is the foster mother to Cousin Anna. She dies of heart stroke in the middle of the book at the age of seventy eight.
- Cousin Anna: Anna is the foster daughter to Aunt Lib. Her age is not mentioned but is presumably in her late twenties. She is the child of Aunt Lib's brother-in-law's wife. Her biological mother and stepfather die in a typhoid breakout, leaving her in the care of Aunt Lib. She is the best friend of Mrs. Pansy Jordan, who is the sister of Carl Stone.
- David Cope: David is sixteen years old and is the eldest Cope Child. He is friends with some rich boys in Guelph who have turned him into a snob. He has strong opinions against Home Children due to his friend's opinions.
- Thomas Cope: Thomas Cope is fourteen at the beginning of the book. He treats all of his siblings including Jasper and Marianna fairly. He is especially loved by Victoria. Thomas is the first family member besides Victoria and Marianna who finds out that Jasper is hiding in the Cope House. He rescues Jasper when he finds him by the river.
- Mrs. Pansy Jordan: Pansy Jordan is the sister of Carl Stone. She is a very close friend to Cousin Anna. She is the reason why Jasper ran away from the Cope house the second time, for being scared that Mr. Stone was looking for him.
- Carl Stone: Carl Stone is the mean employer of Jasper Wilson. He treats him like a slave, and makes him work long hours with little food. He is eventually arrested by the people in charge of the Home Children.
- Roberta Johns: Roberta Johns is another close friend to Victoria. She does everything she can to cheer Marianna up. She is one of the four of the strongest girls in school.

== Awards ==
- Winner of the Canadian Library Association Book of the Year for Children (2001)
- Commended, Canadian Children's Book Centre, Our Choice (2002)
- Diamond Willow Award, Saskatchewan Young Readers' Choice (2003)
- Short-listed, Manitoba Young Readers' Choice Award (2003)
- Short-listed, Red Cedar Award, BC Young Readers' Choice (2004)
