= Garden of Love (song) =

Single by Kim-Lian

from the album Balance
- B-side: "Tracy" (3:58)
- Released: 29 April 2004
- Genre: Pop rock
- Length: 3:43
- Label: CMM Records
- Songwriter(s): Daniel Gibson, Jörgen Ringqvist
- Producer(s): Steven Tracy

Kim-Lian singles chronology
"Hey Boy!" (2004)	"Garden of Love" (2004)	"Kids in America" (2004)

"Garden of Love" is the third single of Dutch singer Kim-Lian. Released on 29 April 2004, the song was taken from her debut album Balance. The music video for the song was directed by Peter van Eyndt, just like the one for "Hey Boy!". The ballad managed to chart within the top 20 of the Dutch Top 40 at number 19 for two weeks.

== Formats and track listings ==
CD single

1. "Garden of Love" [Radio Edit] (Daniel Gibson, Jörgen Ringqvist) - 3:43
2. "Tracy" (Filip de Wilde, Kim-Lian) - 3:58
3. "Garden of Love" [Video] - 3:41

== Chart performance ==
Chart (2004)	Peak position
Netherlands (Dutch Top 40)	19
Netherlands (Single Top 100)	15
