= Children's Crusade (disambiguation) =

The Children's Crusade was a crusade to convert Muslims in the Holy Land in the year 1212.

Children's Crusade may also refer to:

== History ==
- Children's Crusade 1212
- Children's Crusade (1903), a march led by Mother Jones in 1903
- Children's Crusade (1944), the latter half of the Lapland War, a sub-theater of World War II
- Children's Crusade (1963), a 1963 series of walks by the children and students of Birmingham, Alabama, during the American Civil Rights Movement

== Literature ==
- "The Children's Crusade" (comics), a 1993–1994 story arc in DC Comics' Vertigo imprint
- Slaughterhouse-Five, or The Children's Crusade: A Duty-Dance with Death, a 1969 novel by Kurt Vonnegut
- Avengers: The Children's Crusade, a 2010 storyline in Marvel Comics' Young Avengers
- The Children's Crusade, a short story in Michael Cunningham's Specimen Days
- The Children's Crusade, a short novel by Rebecca Brown
- "The Children's Crusade", a short story by Robin Wayne Bailey in the anthology Heroes in Training

== Music ==
- Children's Crusade (Britten), a 1969 composition by Benjamin Britten
- "Children's Crusade", a song by Sting from The Dream of the Blue Turtles

== See also ==
- Innocents Shōnen Jūjigun, a 2007 manga by Usamaru Furuya
- Pentagon Pedophile Task Force, a group promoting conspiracy theories about child trafficking and abuse in the U.S. (their 2019 conference was called the "Children's Crusade")
