= Hey Boy! (Kim-Lian song) =

Single by Kim-Lian

from the album Balance
- Released: 9 February 2004
- Genre: Pop rock
- Length: 3:03 (single version)
- Label: CMM Records
- Songwriter(s): Arto Boyadjian, Wiboud Burkens
- Producer(s): Daniel Gibson, Jörgen Ringqvist

Kim-Lian singles chronology
"Teenage Superstar" (2003)	"Hey Boy!" (2004)	"Garden of Love" (2004)

"Hey Boy!" is the second single of Dutch singer Kim-Lian. Released on 9 February 2004, the song was taken from her debut album Balance. The music video for the song was directed by Peter van Eyndt.

== Track listing ==
1. "Hey Boy!" [Radio Version] - 3:03
2. "Hey Boy!" [Instrumental] - 3:03
3. "Hey Boy!" [Enhanced Video] - 3:02

== Chart performance ==
Chart (2004)	Peak position
Dutch Top 40	4
Belgium Singles Top 50	48
