= Balance (Kim-Lian album) =

Studio album by Kim-Lian
- Released: 24 May 2004
- Recorded: 2003–2004
- Genre: Pop rock
- Length: 43:49
- Label: CMM Records

Kim-Lian chronology
Balance (2004)	Just Do It (2006)

Singles from Balance
- 1. "Teenage Superstar" Released: 4 September 2003; 2. "Hey Boy!" Released: 9 February 2004; 3. "Garden Of Love" Released: 29 April 2004; 4. "Kids in America" Released: 18 August 2004

Balance is the debut album of the Dutch singer Kim-Lian. It was released on 25 May 2004 in the Netherlands. Kim-Lian said the album to be "a fun pop/rock album". The album spawned four top 20 singles, being "Teenage Superstar", "Hey Boy", "Garden of Love" and Kim Wilde cover "Kids in America".

== Track listing ==
No.	Title	Writer(s)	Producer(s)	Length
1.	"Teenage Superstar"	Daniel Gibson, Jörgen Ringqvist	Daniel Gibson, Jörgen Ringqvist	3:09
2.	"Olivia Oblivion"			3:21
3.	"Garden Of Love"			4:25
4.	"Hey Boy!"			4:25
5.	"Addicted"	Gibson, Kim-Lian van der Meij		2:54
6.	"Whatever You Say"			3:07
7.	"Sorry Girl"	Gibson, Han'Some, Ringqvist		3:22
8.	"Big Girl"			3:39
9.	"Forever"			2:50
10.	"Damn You"	Gibson, Ringqvist	Gibson, Ringqvist	3:31
11.	"Cyberpolice"	Gibson, Han'Some		2:59
12.	"Tracy"			3:57
13.	"Kids in America"	Marty Wilde, Ricky Wilde		3:32

== Singles ==
Song	Date	Peak chart positions			
Song	Date	Belgium	India	New Zealand	Sweden
"Teenage Superstar"	4 September 2003	24	1	6	26
"Hey Boy!"	9 February 2004	48	-	6	-
"Garden of Love"	29 April 2004	-	-	19	-
"Kids in America"	18 August 2004	50	-	15	-

== Chart performance ==
Chart performance for Balance
Chart (2004)	Peak position
Dutch Albums (Album Top 100)	43
