= Glory Days and Other Stories =

Glory Days and Other Stories by Gillian Chan is a collection of five interlinked short stories first published in 1996 by Kids Can Press. It is the sequel of Golden Girl and Other Stories which is set in the same high school. Glory Days and Other Stories follows the lives of a group of teenagers who must face issues involving "dating, family, power, and identity".

The novel underwent some controversy in 2000 for including a story that features date rape. It was also the recipient of several awards.

== Controversy ==
In 2000 Glory Days and Other Stories was deemed inappropriate for elementary school students in the Langley School District in British Columbia after a teacher being tried for sexual assault was revealed to have taught the novel in her Grade 4 and 5 class. The novel has a story which features a date rape. "The school principal suggested to the board superintendent that the book be withdrawn from Langley schools". After two years, "a school board official" announced that the book had been removed from elementary schools in the district. It still has a place in the secondary school libraries.

== Awards ==
Gillian Chan was the shortlist finalist for two awards for Glory Days in 1996:

- Governor General's Literary Award
- Mr. Christie's Book Award

She also was the winner of one award:

- Hamilton and Region Arts' Council Literary Award, 1996

The novel also received the following praise from The Hamilton Spectator: "Glory Days explores real issues facing young adults without ever taking on a preachy, parental tone ...Chan never settles for the easy, perfect out. The stories are intricate, as is life, and the characters are flawed, as are all of us."
