= From Anna =

1972 novel by Jean Little

- Cover of the first edition
- Author: Jean Little
- Illustrator: Joan Sandin
- Language: English
- Genre: Children's literature
- Published: 1972 HarperCollins (US)
- Publication place: Canada
- Pages: 201
- ISBN: 0-06-440044-1
- Followed by: Listen for the Singing

From Anna is a children's novel written by Canadian children's author Jean Little, first published in 1972. It is the story of Anna Solden, a visually impaired child who moves from Germany to Canada with her family, on the eve of Hitler's rise to power in Germany. The book is one of Jean Little's most popular works.

== Characters ==
- Anna Elisabeth Solden –The title character. The youngest of five siblings and always the odd one out, Anna feels misunderstood by her family. While her siblings are beautiful and athletic, she is slow and clumsy. She bumps into things and slips on the floor, cannot sew or dust, and earns the nickname "Awkward Anna" from her siblings.
- Ernst Solden, "Papa" – Anna's father, who works as an English teacher at a private school in Frankfurt. He loves all his children, but he has a special place in his heart for Anna, called "Papa's Pet". He distrusts the new regime in Germany and seeks to take his family to a place where his children can grow up with free thoughts.
- Klara Solden, "Mama" – Anna's mother. Mama is unable to understand Anna's inability to do what she sees as simple and basic tasks, she frequently becomes exasperated with her youngest daughter. When one of her children has done something extra special, she calls them "The Dearest Child", a practice which irritates Anna, as she never seems to earn the title the same way her siblings do. Her mother never seems to see what her daughter does to please her.
- Rudolf "Rudi" Solden – The eldest child. He is often mean to Anna and teases her. While reading through an English dictionary he comes up with the nickname "Awkward Anna".
- Gretchen "Gretel" Solden – Second child, her mother's helper, she is often exasperated with her sister's inability to do the chores she has been doing for years.
- Fritz and Elfrieda "Frieda" Solden – The twins. They are younger than Rudi and Gretchen, Fritz and Elfrieda nevertheless included in their older siblings's games.
- Dr. Schumacher – Friend of the late Uncle Karl. He examines the children when they come to Canada, discovers Anna's inability to see, and becomes one of Anna's staunchest allies.
- Miss Williams – Anna's first teacher in Canada. She sees something special in Anna.

== Plot summary ==
In the mid 1930s in Germany, things are changing, people are moving away or disappearing. The new headmaster at the Solden's school forbids the singing of a song titled "My thoughts are free" (Die Gedanken sind frei) during an assembly, instead making the school sing the national anthem. Anna's father, disturbed by the changes in his country, promises Anna that she will be able to grow up in a place where her thoughts are free. When his brother Karl in Canada dies, leaving him his shop and the home he had purchased there, Ernst sees an opportunity to move to Canada. He announces to his family that they will be moving to Canada. The rest of the family comes on board slowly, but Anna, terrified, resists. In Germany she is nearly failing school, how will she manage in a new country and a new language?

When they arrive in Toronto, they are greeted by a friend of their uncle's, Dr. Schumacher, who helps them move in, and gives the children check-ups before they start school. Anna is terrified to learn she will be starting school soon, but during her examination, a startling discovery is made; Anna can barely see. A prescription for glasses helps immensely; however, even with the glasses, she has less than normal vision, and is put in a special multi-grade class for students with similar vision. Her teacher here is Miss Williams. Seeing the potential in Anna she sets out to slowly coach the girl out of her shell. She gives Anna A Child's Garden of Verses, and Anna discovers a love of reading. Her English improves with leaps and bounds, and soon she speaks only English at school and with the friends she has found there. However, she continues to present her old prickly side to her family, remembering all the years when they didn't understand her.

As the Soldens' first Christmas in Canada approaches, the children are becoming more and more aware of the effects of the Great Depression on their lives. Instead of keeping with tradition in getting money from their parents to buy presents, the older children decide to come up with presents for their parents themselves. They struggle to include Anna, but in the end, decide she is "only a kid" and that their parents will not expect anything from her. Anna is hurt and infuriated by this, and she cannot keep her mood from her classmates the next day. When she describes her problem to Miss Williams, a flood of similar stories comes from her classmates. They all express a desire to give their parents a present that truly shows how much they are capable of.

Miss Williams returns the next day with a plan. With money for supplies provided by herself and Dr. Schumacher, the children are going to weave wastepaper baskets. Some children are dubious, but Anna takes to it right away, weaving a beautiful basket. On Christmas Eve, after her siblings have presented their gifts for Mama and Papa, Anna brings hers out. Her parents are amazed and her siblings surprised, wondering how she could have made something so beautiful. Miss Williams and Dr. Schumacher, invited by Anna to share in the family's celebrations, arrive. The novel closes with the whole group singing "Silent Night", the children in English, and the adults (minus Miss Williams) in German.
