= Road to Heaven =

Single by Kim-Lian

from the album Just Do It
- B-side: "Open Your Eyes"
- Released: 29 April 2006
- Recorded: 2006
- Genre: Pop rock
- Length: 3:14
- Label: Bass Commander Records
- Songwriter(s): Kim-Lian, Daniel Gibson
- Producer(s): Daniël Gibson, Jörgen Ringqvist

Kim-Lian singles chronology
"Kids in America" (2004)	"Road to Heaven" (2006)	"In Vain" (2006)

"Road to Heaven" is the fifth single of Dutch singer Kim-Lian and the lead single from her second album Just Do It. It was released on 29 April 2006. Although the song was expected to be a hit, it became her lowest-charting single in the Dutch Top 40 peaking at number 28.

== Formats and track listing ==
CD single

1. "Road to Heaven"
2. "Open Your Eyes"
3. "Road to Heaven" [Radio Edit]
4. "Road to Heaven" [Enhanced Video]

== Video ==
The music video for "Road to Heaven" was shot in Las Vegas, Nevada, United States. You see Kim-Lian driving with her band in a car through a desert when suddenly their car breaks down. After the car is repaired they drive further but the need to stop for a fence. But they decide to break through. At the end you see her and the band having fun inside the city of Las Vegas.

== Song information ==
The song was written by Kim-Lian herself and her partner Daniel Gibson. The song is about breaking free or something. People think it's about her breakup with her old record label because she claimed not to have the musical freedom she wanted. In the lyrics this is said:

Don't be afraid to follow your dreams.
Don't let them down.

She has found her 'Road to Heaven' now because she can write and sing whatever she wants.

== Charts ==
Chart (2006)	Peak position
Dutch Top 40	28
