= Ruby Slipperjack =

Canadian writer

Ruby Slipperjack, or Ruby Slipperjack-Farrell, (born 1952) is an Ojibwe writer and painter. Her work discusses traditional religious and social customs of the Ojibwe in northern Ontario, as well as the incursion of modernity on their culture. She is a member of Eabametoong First Nation.

== Background ==
Ruby Slipperjack-Farrell is a Professor and the Chair of the Department of Indigenous Learning at Lakehead University in Thunder Bay, Ontario. Slipperjack-Farrell spent her formative years on her father's trap line on Whitewater Lake. Slipperjack learned traditional stories and crafts from her family and has retained much of the traditional religion and heritage of her people. Her family later moved to a community along the railway mainline. She went to residential school for several years, finished high-school in Thunder Bay.

After graduating from high school Slipperjack-Farrell successfully completed a B.A. (History) in 1988; a B.Ed. in 1989; and a Master of Education in 1993. In 2005, she completed a Doctoral program at the University of Western Ontario.

Her prior novels include Honour the Sun, Silent Words, Weesquachak and the Lost Ones, Little Voice, Weesquachak and Dog Tracks. She contributed stories to the Dear Canada anthologies Hoping for Home: Stories of Arrival and A Time for Giving: Ten Tales of Christmas.

Slipperjack-Farrell has retained much of the traditional religion and heritage of her people, all of which inform her writing. Her first novel, Honour the Sun, about a young girl growing up in a tiny Ojibwa community in northern Ontario, earned rave reviews and is widely used schools. Slipperjack-Farrell is also an accomplished visual artist and a certified First Nations hunter. Her work discusses traditional religious and social customs of the Ojibwe in northern Ontario, as well as the incursion of modernity on their culture.

== Awards ==
- Vicky Metcalf Award for Literature for Young People

== Bibliography ==
- Honour the Sun, Pemmican Pub., 1987.
- Silent Words, Fifth House Books, 1992.
- Weesquachak and the Lost Ones, Theytus Books, 1998.
- Little Voice, Coteau Books, 2001.
- Dog Tracks, Fifth House Books, 2008.
- These are my Words, Scholastic Canada, 2016

=== Chapters, forewords, and translations ===
- Hoping for Home. (2011). ISBN 9780545986977. Markham, ON: Scholastic Canada.
- A Time for Giving: Ten Tales of Christmas. (2015). ISBN 9781443133739. Markham, ON: Scholastic Canada.
- Les mots qu'il me reste. tr. (2016). ISBN 9781443156004. Markham, ON: Éditions Scholastic. Translation of These Are My Words (2016).
