= Julie Lawson =

Canadian writer

- Born: November 9, 1947 (age 78); Victoria, British Columbia, Canada
- Education: University of Victoria (BA)
- Occupation: Author
- Spouse: Patrick Lawson
- Writing career
- Notable awards: Sheila A. Egoff Children's Literature Prize (1994)
- Website: julielawson.ca

Julie Lawson (born November 9, 1947, in Victoria, Canada) is a Canadian writer of children's nonfiction books. Her 1993 book, White Jade Tiger, won the Sheila A. Egoff Children's Literature Prize.

== Biography ==
Lawson was born November 9, 1947, in Victoria, British Columbia, Canada. Her grandfather was an immigrant from Sweden. She received a Bachelor of Arts from the University of Victoria with teaching certifications in French and English.

Lawson's first book, The Sand Sifter, was published in 1990. Aside from writing, she worked as a school teacher in France, as well as Saanich and Sooke, British Columbia.

She is married to Patrick Lawson.

== Awards and honours ==
Emma and the Silk Train is a Junior Library Guild book.

Awards for Lawson's writing
Year	Title	Award	Result	Ref.
1994	White Jade Tiger	Sheila A. Egoff Children's Literature Prize	Winner	
1997	Whatever You Do, Don’t Go Near That Canoe!	Tiny Torgi Literary Award	Winner	
1998	Emma and the Silk Train	Sheila A. Egoff Children's Literature Prize	Finalist	
2008	No Safe Harbour	Hackmatack Children's Choice Book Award	Winner	
2011	Ghosts of the Titanic	Silver Birch Award	Finalist	
2013	Ghosts of the Titanic	Chocolate Lily Young Readers' Choice Award	Winner	
2018	A Blinding Light	Bolen Books Children's Book Prize	Finalist	
2018	A Blinding Light	Geoffrey Bilson Award	Finalist	

== Selected publications ==
- The Sand Sifter, Beach Holme, 1990.
- My Grandfather Loved the Stars, illustrated by Judy McLaren, Beach Holme, 1992.
- A Morning to Polish and Keep, illustrated by Sheena Lott, Red Deer College Press, 1992.
- Kate's Castle, illustrated by Frances Tyrrell, Oxford University Press, 1992.
- The Dragon's Pearl, illustrated by Paul Morin, Oxford University Press, 1992.
- White Jade Tiger, Beach Holme, 1993.
- Fires Burning, Stoddart, 1995, published as The Danger Game, Little, Brown and Company, 1996.
- Blown Away, illustrated by Kathryn Naylor, Red Deer College Press, 1995.
- Too Many Suns, illustrated by Martin Springette, Oxford University Press, 1996.
- Cougar Cove, Orca, 1996.
- Whatever You Do, Don't Go Near That Canoe!, illustrated by Werner Zimmermann, North Winds Press, 1996.
- Emma and the Silk Train, illustrated by Paul Mombourquette, Kids Can Press, 1997.
- Midnight in the Mountains, illustrated by Sheena Lott, Orca, 1998.
- In like a Lion, illustrated by Yolaine Lefebvre, North Winds Press, 1998.
- Bear on the Train, illustrated by Brian Deines, Kids Can Press, 1999.
- Destination Gold!, Orca, 2000.
- The Klondike Cat, illustrated by Paul Mombourquette, Kids Can Press, 2002.
- A Ribbon of Shining Steel: The Railway Diary of Kate Cameron (in "Dear Canada" series), Scholastic, 2002.
- Arizona Charlie and the Klondike Kid, illustrated by Kasia Charko, Orca, 2003.
- No Safe Harbour: The Halifax Explosion Diary of Charlotte Blackburn (in "Dear Canada" series), Scholastic, 2006.

=== Goldstone series ===
1. Goldstone, Stoddart Kids, 1997.
2. Turns on a Dime, Stoddart, 1999.
3. The Ghost of Avalanche Mountain, Stoddart, 2000.

=== "Our Canadian Girl" series ===
1. Emily: Across the James Bay Bridge, Penguin, 2001.
2. Emily: Disaster at the Bridge, Penguin, 2002.
3. Emily: Building Bridges, Penguin, 2003.
4. Emily: Summer of Gold, Penguin, 2004.
