= Mine for Keeps =

1962 book by Jean Little

- First edition
- Author: Jean Little
- Illustrator: Lewis Parker
- Language: English
- Genre: Children's literature
- Publisher: Little, Brown & Co.
- Publication date: 1962
- Publication place: Canada
- ISBN: 9781774882948
- OCLC: 522612

Mine for Keeps is a 1962 book by the Canadian children's author Jean Little. At the time she wrote Mine for Keeps, Little was teaching in a school for the disabled and she had written the book after becoming tired of reading her students books in which disabled child characters either meet deaths or recover completely (like Clara in Heidi, or Colin in The Secret Garden).

== Overview ==
Born with cerebral palsy, nine-year-old Sally has spent the past five years at a special rehabilitation school. Her dream of living with her family instead of just visiting finally comes true when a new mainstream school opens near their home. Adjusting to her new life and the typical challenges of starting a new school and meeting new friends are heightened for Sally through the unique problems of being handicapped in the world.
