= Barbara Haworth-Attard =

Canadian children's writer (born 1953)

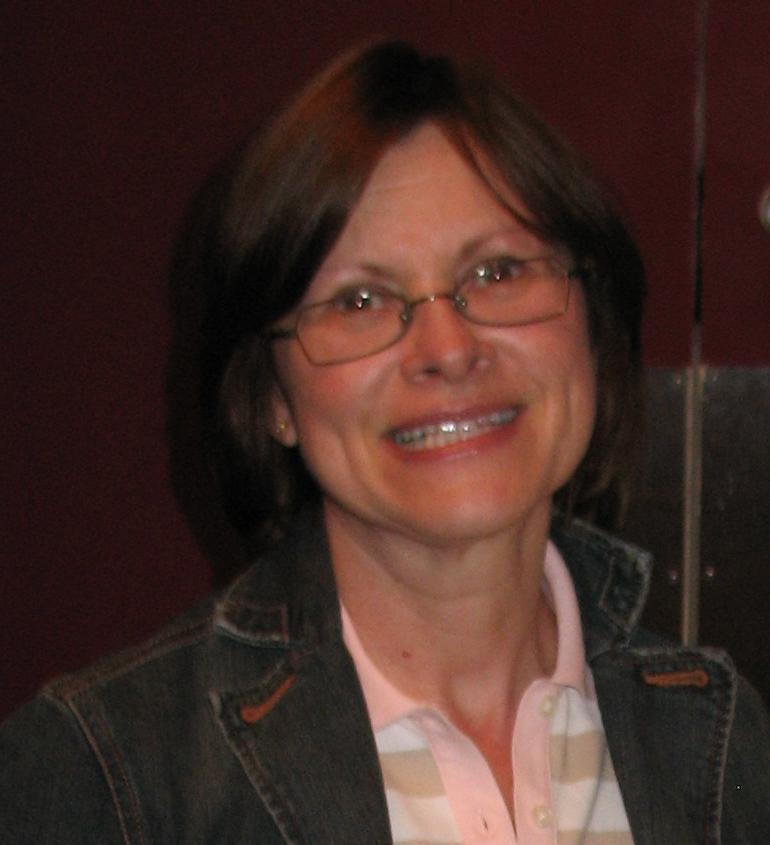
- Haworth-Attard at GenreCon 2007
- Born: 25 July 1953 (age 73); Kitchener, Ontario, Canada
- Occupation: Writer
- Writing career
- Genre: Children's literature
- Notable awards: Arthur Ellis Award (2010)
- Website: barbhaworthattard.com

Barbara Haworth-Attard (born 25 July 1953) is a Canadian children's writer. Among other awards and honours, she won the 2010Arthur Ellis Award for Best Juvenile.

Haworth-Attard was born in Kitchener, Ontario. As of 2015, she lived in London, Ontario.

== Awards and honours ==
In 1996, Home Child was named a CLA Notable Book of the Year.

Awards for Haworth-Attard's work
Year	Title	Award	Result	Ref.
1997	Home Child	Geoffrey Bilson Award	Finalist	
2001	Love-Lies-Bleeding	Geoffrey Bilson Award	Finalist	
2003	Irish Chain	Forest of Reading Red Maple Award	Finalist	
2003	Irish Chain	Geoffrey Bilson Award	Finalist	
2003	Theories of Relativity	Governor General's Award for English-language young people's literature - text	Finalist	
2006	Forget-Me-Not	Geoffrey Bilson Award	Finalist	
2010	Haunted	Arthur Ellis Award for Best Juvenile	Winner	
2010	Haunted	Geoffrey Bilson Award	Finalist	
2011	Haunted	Forest of Reading Red Maple Award	Finalist	

== Works ==
- The Three Wishbells (1995)
- Dark of the Moon (1995)
- Home Child (1996)
- TruthSinger (1996)
- Buried Treasure (1998)
- WyndMagic (1999)
- Love-Lies-Bleeding (1999)
- Flying Geese (2001)
- Irish Chain (2002)
- Theories of Relativity (2003), nominated for a Governor General's Award
- A Trail of Broken Dreams: The Gold Rush Diary of Harriet Palmer (Dear Canada) (2004)
- Forget-Me-Not (2005)
- A Is For Angst (2007)
- My Life from Air-Bras to Zits (2009)
- Haunted (2009)
- To Stand on My Own: The Polio Epidemic Diary of Noreen Robertson (Dear Canada) (2010)
