= Maxine Trottier =

American-born Canadian educator and writer

- Born: May 3, 1950 (age 76); Grosse Pointe Farms, Michigan, USA
- Citizenship: Canadian
- Education: University of Western Ontario
- Writing career
- Notable work: The Tiny Kite of Eddie Wing
- Notable awards: Canadian Library Association Book of the Year for Children Award (1996); Mr. Christie’s Book Award (1999)

Maxine Trottier (born May 3, 1950) is an American-born Canadian educator and writer.

== Biography ==
Trottier was born May 3, 1950, in Grosse Pointe Farms, Michigan. She immigrated with her family to Windsor, Ontario when she was 10 years old and became a Canadian citizen in 1970 at age 20. She graduated from the University of Western Ontario with a degree in education and taught elementary school for 31 years.

Trottier published her debut novel, Alison's House, in 1993 and has since published over thirty books, many of which have been published in French. She is known for writing about the history of Canada. She draws on her own mixed racial heritage as a descendant of Métis ancestors. Many of her books feature bilingual English/Mi'kmaq texts.

Her book Claire's Gift received the Mr. Christie's Book Award. The Tiny Kite of Eddie Wing won the Canadian Library Association Book of the Year for Children Award.

Trottier currently lives in Newfoundland.

== Awards and honours ==
The following are Canadian Children's Book Centre Our Choice Awards selections: Alison's House (1993), The Voyage of Wood Duck (1995), and Heartsong (1997).

Sister to the Wolf is a 2006 ALSC Notable Children's Book.

Migrant is a Junior Library Guild and USBBY Outstanding International Books List selection. The New York Times included it on their list of the then best illustrated children's books of 2011, and it is a 2012 ALSC Notable Children's Book.

Awards for Trottier's writing
Year	Title	Award	Result	Ref.
1996	The Tiny Kite of Eddie Wing	Canadian Library Association Book of the Year for Children Award	Winner	
1999	Claire's Gift	Mr. Christie's Book Award	Winner	
2002	By the Standing Stone	Forest of Reading Red Maple Award	Finalist	
2002	Under a Shooting Star	Geoffrey Bilson Award	Finalist	
2004	Dear Canada: Alone in an Untamed Land	Forest of Reading Silver Birch Award for Fiction	Finalist	
2005	Our Canadian Flag	Forest of Reading Blue Spruce Award	Finalist	
2005	Sister to the Wolf	Forest of Reading Red Maple Award	Finalist	
2006	The Death of My Country	Geoffrey Bilson Award	Finalist	
2007	Three Songs for Courage	Forest of Reading White Pine Award	Finalist	

== Publications ==
=== Children's fiction ===
- Alison's House, illustrated by Michael Martchenko, Oxford University Press, 1993.
- The Voyage of Wood Duck, Mi'kmaq translation by Helen Sylliboy, illustrations by Patsy MacAulay-MacKinnon, UCCB Press, 1995.
- Loon Rock, Mi'kmaq translation by Helen Sylliboy, illustrated by Dozay Christmas, UCCB Press, 1996.
- The Tiny Kite of Eddie Wing, illustrated by Art Van Mil, Kane/Miller Book Publishers, 1996.
- Pavlova's Gift, illustrated by Victoria Berdichevsky, Stoddart, 1996.
- A Safe Place, illustrated by Judith Friedman, Albert Whitman, 1997.
- Heartsong, Gaelic translation by Rosemary McCormack, illustrated by Patsy MacAulay-MacKinnon, UCCB Press, 1997.
- Prairie Willow, illustrated by Laura Fernandez and Rick Jacobson, Stoddart, 1998.
- One Is Canada, illustrated by Bill Slavin, HarperCollins Canada, 1999.
- Claire's Gift, illustrated by Rajke Kupesic, North Winds Press, 1999.
- Dreamstones, illustrated by Stella East, Stoddart, 1999.
- A Circle of Silver, Stoddart, 1999.
- The Walking Stick, illustrated by Annouchka Gravel Galouchko, Stoddart, 1999.
- By the Standing Stone (sequel to A Circle of Silver), Stoddart, 2000.
- Laura: A Childhood Tale of Laura Secord, illustrated by Karen Reczuch, North Winds Press, 2000.
- Little Dog Moon, illustrated by Laura Fernandez and Rick Jacobson, Stoddart, 2000.
- Storm at Batoche, illustrated by John Mantha, Stoddart, 2000.
- There Have Always Been Foxes, illustrated by Regolo Ricci, Stoddart, 2001.
- Under a Shooting Star (sequel to By the Standing Stone), Stoddart, 2001.
- The Paint Box, illustrated by Stella East, Fitzhenry & Whiteside, 2003.
- Three Songs for Courage, Tundra Books, 2006.
- The Long White Scarf, illustrated by David Craig, Fitzhenry & Whiteside, 2006.

==== "Dear Canada" series ====
- Alone in an Untamed Land: The "Filles du Roi" Diary of Hélène St. Onge, Scholastic Canada, 2004.
- The Death of My Country: The Plains of Abraham Diary of Geneviéve Aubuchon, Scholastic Canada, 2005.
- Blood Upon Our Land: The North West Resistance Diary of Josephine Bouvier, Scholastic Canada, 2009.

=== Children's nonfiction ===
- Flags, illustrated by Paul Morin, Stoddart, 1999.
- One Is Canada, illustrated by Bill Slavin, HarperCollins, 1999.
- Native Crafts: Inspired by North America's First Peoples, illustrated by Esperanca Melo, Kids Can Press, 2000.
- Our Canadian Flag, illustrated by Brian Deines, Scholastic Canada, 2004.
- Terry Fox: A Story of Hope, Scholastic Canada, 2005.

==== "Scholastic Canada Biographies" series ====
- Canadian Pioneers, illustrated by Alan and Lea Daniel, Scholastic Canada, 2003.
- Canadian Greats, illustrated by Marc Thurman, Scholastic Canada, 2003.
- Canadian Inventors, Scholastic Canada, 2004.
- Canadian Stars, Scholastic Canada, 2004.
- Canadian Artists, Scholastic Canada, 2006.
- Canadian Explorers, Scholastic Canada, 2006.
- Canadian Leaders, Scholastic Canada, 2006.
- Canadian Heroes, Scholastic Canada, 2007.

=== Contributions ===
- Sherwood: Original Stories from the World of Robin Hood, edited by Jane Yolen, illustrated by Dennis Nolan, Philomel, 2000.
