= Gillian Chan =

Canadian children's author

- Born: 1954 (age 71–72)
- Occupation: author
- Writing career
- Genre: children's literature
- Website: www.gillianchan.com

Gillian Chan (born 1954) is a Canadian children's author who lives in Dundas, Ontario.

She was educated at Orange Hill Grammar School, Rochester Grammar School for Girls, and the University of East Anglia (BEd, 1980).

Chan is also the author of a short diary entry of Chin Mei-ling's during the Christmas week a year or so after the original diary ended for the Christmas treasury from the Dear Canada series, A Season for Miracles: Twelve Tales of Christmas.

On October 27, 2006, Chan competed on the television show Jeopardy!, finishing in last place.

== Works ==
- Golden Girl and Other Stories - 1994
- Glory Days and Other Stories - 1996 (Nominated for a Governor General's Award)
- The Carved Box - 2001
- A Foreign Field - 2002
- An Ocean Apart: The Gold Mountain Diary of Chin Mei-ling (Dear Canada) - 2004
- The Turning - 2005
- I Am Canada: A Call to Battle - 2012
