= Jean Little =

Canadian writer (1932–2020)

Jean Little CM
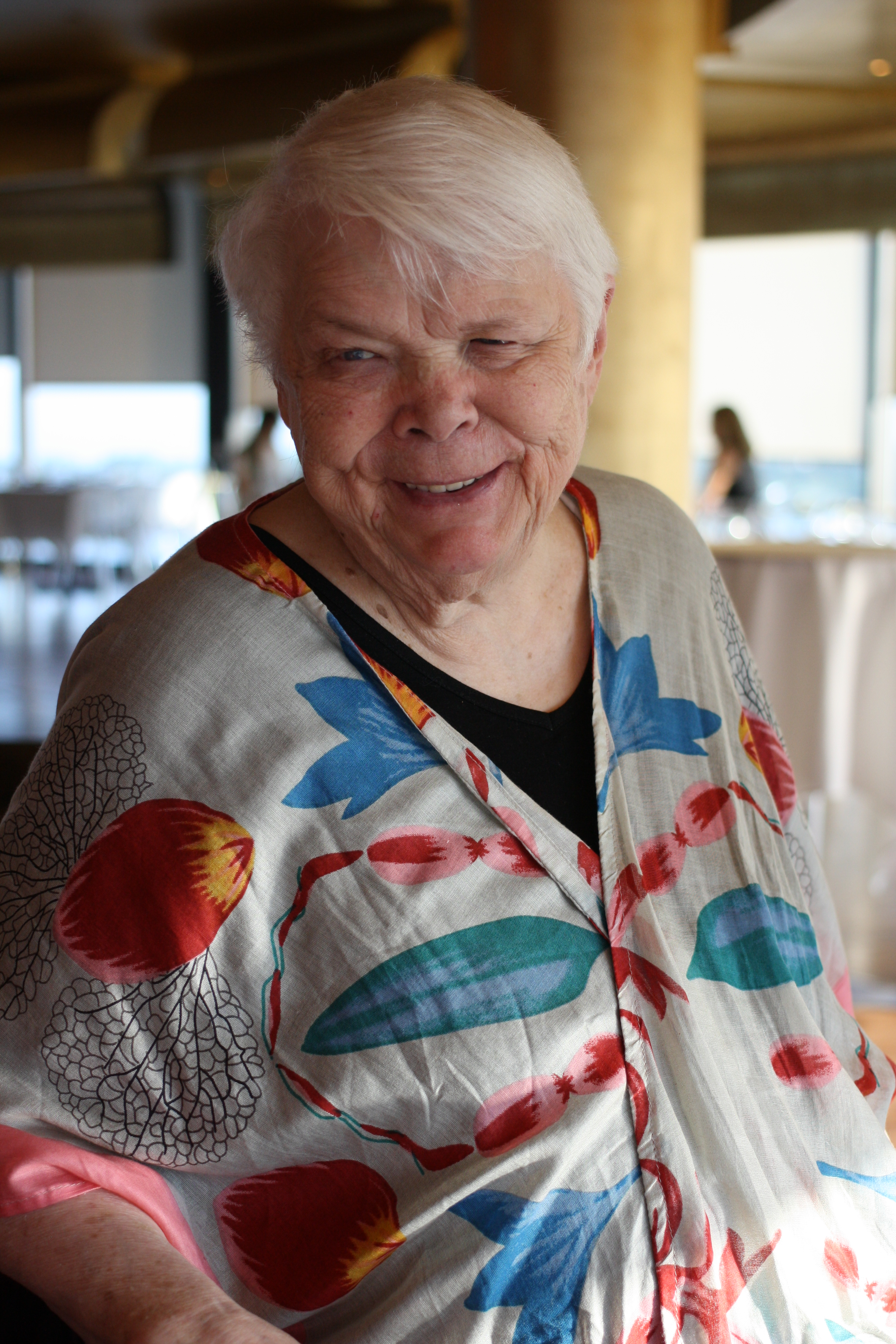
- Little in 2016
- Born: January 2, 1932; Formosa, Japan (now Taiwan)
- Died: April 6, 2020 (aged 88); Guelph, Ontario, Canada
- Occupation: Writer
- Writing career
- Genres: Children's fiction, memoir

Jean Little, CM (January 2, 1932 – April 6, 2020) was a Canadian writer of over 50 books. Her work mainly consisted of children's literature, but she also wrote two autobiographies: Little by Little and Stars Come Out Within. Little was partially blind since birth as a result of scars on her cornea and was frequently accompanied by a guide dog.

== Life and career ==
Little was born in Formosa, the daughter of Flora (Gauld), a doctor, and John Llewellyn Little, a physician. Her parents were Canadian doctors serving as medical missionaries under the United Church of Canada. The Little family came home to live in Canada in 1939, moving to Guelph in 1940. Although Little was legally blind from birth, she attended elementary and secondary school in regular classes. She went to the University of Toronto and obtained a Bachelor of Arts in English Language and Literature.

After teaching disabled children for several years, Little wrote her first children's novel, Mine for Keeps, about a child with cerebral palsy. It won the Little, Brown Canadian Children's Book Award and was published in 1962. She has subsequently written over 50 published works, which include novels, picture books, poetry, short stories, and two autobiographical books. Her novel His Banner Over Me is based on her mother's childhood. Little won literary awards for her work and has been published internationally.

Her novel Mama's Going to Buy You a Mockingbird won the Canadian Library Association Book of the Year for Children Award in 1985, and was later adapted into a 1988 television film by Sandy Wilson.

Little taught Children's Literature at the University of Guelph, where she was an adjunct professor in the Department of English. She had six honorary degrees, was a Member of the Order of Canada and a recipient of the Queen's Diamond Jubilee Medal. Jean Little Public School, in Guelph, Ont. is named in her honour.

She journeyed widely talking to both adults and children themselves about the joys to be found through reading and writing. In March 2004, she went to India and in November 2006 to Bulgaria. Little gave the 2016 Margaret Lawrence Lecture at the Canadian Writers Summit in June.

As of 2016, Little resided in Guelph, Ontario with her sister Pat deVries, her great-niece Jeanie, and her great-nephew Ben. She continued to write through the aid of a voice-activated computer and travelled with her guide dog Honey. She died on April 6, 2020, at age 88.

== Themes ==
Several of Little's books, such as Mine for Keeps and From Anna, focus on children who have a disability or are affected by a person with a disability. As many of her books were written several decades ago, they now serve as examples of how children with disabilities were previously raised and treated by society. Another frequent theme is adoption and foster care, as shown in Home from Far and Willow and Twig. Children often find homes and families throughout the course of the novel, whether it consists of rediscovering the importance of their family, being reunited with family or creating a new family in their new situation. While the novels often touch on very sad events, ranging from serious illness, abuse and death, the endings are usually positive and show the resilience of children.

== Works ==
- Mine for Keeps
- Spring Begins in March – sequel to Mine for Keeps
- Mama's Going to Buy You a Mockingbird
- Different Dragons
- Lost and Found
- From Anna
- Hey World, Here I Am!
- Willow and Twig
- I Know an Old Laddie
- Brothers Far from Home (Dear Canada)
- If I Die Before I Wake (Dear Canada)
- His Banner Over Me
- Look Through My Window
- Kate
- Stand in the Wind
- One to Grow On
- What Will the Robin Do Then?
- Listen for the Singing – sequel to From Anna
- Little by Little – autobiography
- Stars Come Out Within – sequel autobiography
- Somebody Else's Summer
- Dancing Through the Snow
- Love in Paris
- Yesterday
- Orphan at My Door (Dear Canada)
- Growing Pains
- Home from Far
- Revenge of the Small Small
- Take Wing
- Exiles from the War (Dear Canada)
- All Fall Down (Dear Canada)
- Do Not Open Until Christmas
- When the Pie was Opened
- The Belonging Place
- Forward, Shakespeare!
- Plenty
