= The Primrose Path (Matas novel) =

1995 novel by Carol Matas

- Author: Carol Matas
- Language: English
- Genre: Novel; children's literature
- Publisher: Bain & Cox
- Publication date: 1995
- Publication place: Canada
- Media type: Print (hardback & paperback)
- Pages: 152

The Primrose Path is a 1995 novel by Carol Matas. According to the author, the book "is about sexual abuse, but it's not graphic". In addition to the text, Matas also supplies the reader with a six-page glossary detailing various terms related to the Jewish faith.

== Plot summary ==
A fourteen-year-old Jewish girl named Debbie moves to a new city and finds herself part of a small Jewish Orthodox community. Soon she comes into contact with Rabbi Werner, who is the principal of the Orthodox school that his synagogue houses, Debbie's teacher, and a child molester. After his seemingly accidental tickles and touches become inappropriate, Debbie tells her father about the non-sexual touching. He confronts Rabbi Werner. However, instead of rejecting the rabbi, the local community rallies to defend him and rejects Debbie and her family. The story is complicated with marital issues within Debbie's family, and is further complicated by the fact that Rabbi Werner never faces justice for his crimes.

== Reception ==
The Primrose Path was a finalist for the Manitoba Book of the Year in 1995, as well as being recognized as an Outstanding Book Of The Year by the Children’s Book Centre in 1996. The novel was also a finalist for the Manitoba Young Readers Choice Award in 1997.

== Controversy ==
In 1995 Matas had been invited to speak at an interfaith luncheon at the Shaarey Zedek synagogue in Winnipeg, which she and her family had attended for three generations. However, the invitation was withdrawn several weeks before the scheduled presentation, as the synagogue feared the possibility of libel because the fictional story had parallels with a recent charge against a Winnipeg rabbi. In response, Matas stated "This is paranoia of the worst sort and censorship in the worst way. Libel chill isn't a strong enough term. Basically, they're censoring me and not the book. Somehow, I am no longer acceptable". Denying all accounts that claimed her story held similarities with Bryks, saying that her book is "a universal story which I based on research across North America. And in two other communities where I've spoken besides Winnipeg, people in the audience believe that the book is about a specific case in their community. It says to me that I'm doing my job as a writer because it is a universal story." Matas has not received any libel suits against the novel.

== Bibliography ==
- Wytenbroek, J. R. "Review of The Primrose Path." in Quill and Quire 61.11 (Nov. 1995): 45. Rpt. in Children's Literature Review. Detroit: Gale. Literature Resource Center. Web. 30 Jan. 2016.
