= Carol Matas =

Canadian writer

- Born: November 14, 1949 (age 76)
- Occupation: Author
- Writing career
- Genre: Children's literature

Carol Matas is a Canadian writer. She has had more than fifty books for young people published over several decades, including science fiction, fantasy, historical, contemporary, realistic fiction, historical fiction and foods science. Her novels often reflect a Jewish perspective, and her best-known are set during the Holocaust. Her books have been highly honored, including having been shortlisted for the Governor General's Awards twice.

== Career ==
Matas' book A Struggle for Hope was launched as part of the first Holocaust Education Week in Winnipeg in November 2021.

On November 10, 2025, during Holocaust Education Month, Matas held the public launch of her book A Storm Unleashed, organised by the Jewish Heritage Centre of Western Canada, at which the Minister of Education and Childhood Learning Tracy Schmidt announced that Manitoba was implementing a mandatory Holocaust education curriculum for grades 6, 9, and 11. A Storm Unleashed is the only novel in the grade 6 portion of the curriculum.

Matas is based in Winnipeg, Manitoba.

== Bibliography ==
=== Cloning Miranda series ===
- Cloning Miranda (1999)
- The Second Clone (2001)
- The Dark Clone (2005)

=== Minds series ===
Written with Perry Nodelman.

- Of Two Minds
- More Minds
- Out of Their Minds
- A Meeting of Minds

=== Dear Canada series ===
- Footsteps in the Snow: The Red River Diary of Isobel Scott
- Turned Away: The World War II Diary of Devorah Bernstein
- Pieces of the Past: The Holocaust Diary of Rose Rabinowitz

=== I Am Canada series ===
- Behind Enemy Lines: World War II, Sam Frederiksen

=== Other books ===
- After the War
- A Storm Unleashed (2025)
- A Struggle for Hope (2021)
- Daniel's Story
- The Freak
- The Garden
- Greater Than Angels
- In My Enemy's House
- Jesper
- Kris's War (formerly Code Name Kris)
- Lisa's War
- The Lost Locket
- Past Crimes (2007)
- The Primrose Path
- Sparks Fly Upward
- Tucson Jo (2014)
- Visions
- The War Within
- When I Die: A Meditation on Death for Children & Their Families (2013)

=== Contributions to anthologies ===
- A Season for Miracles: Twelve Tales of Christmas (part of the Dear Canada series)
- A Time for Giving: Ten Tales of Christmas (part of the Dear Canada series)
