= Karleen Bradford =

Canadian children's author

- Born: Karleen Scott; December 16, 1936 (age 89); Toronto, Ontario, Canada
- Education: University of Toronto (BA, 1959)
- Occupation: Author
- Spouse: James C. Bradford (m. 1959)
- Children: 3
- Writing career
- Genre: Children's literature
- Notable awards: Canadian Library Association Young Adult Book Award (1993)

Karleen Bradford (née Scott; born 1936) is a Canadian children's author who primarily writes historical fiction.

Bradford began her career as an advertising copywriter for Eaton's, then was a social worker for a few years before dedicating her time to writing in 1963. She published her first book, A Year for Growing, in 1977. As of 2026, Bradford has published 24 novels. Windward Island (1989) won the 1990 Max and Greta Ebel Award, and There Will be Wolves (1992) won the 1993 Canadian Library Association Young Adult Book Award. She has been nominated for the Geoffrey Bilson Award twice, once in 1997 for Shadows of a Sword and once in 2005 for Angeline.

== Personal life ==
Bradford was born in Toronto on December 16, 1936, to Karl H. and Eileen (née Ney) Scott. Her family moved to Buenos Aires when she was a child. She received a Bachelor of Arts from the University of Toronto in 1959 and married James C. Bradford on August 22 of that year. The couple has three children.

As of 2020, she resided in Owen Sound, Ontario.

== Published books ==
1. A Year for Growing (1977) - republished as Wrong Again Robby in 1983
2. The Other Elizabeth (1982)
3. I Wish There Were Unicorns (1983)
4. The Stone in the Meadow (1983)
5. The Haunting at Cliff House (1985)
6. The Nine Days Queen (1986)
7. Windward Island (1989)
8. There Will be Wolves (1992)
9. Thirteenth Child (1994)
10. Animal Heroes (1995)
11. Write Now! (1996)
12. Shadows on a Sword (1996)
13. More Animal Heroes (1996)
14. Dragonfire (1997)
15. A different Kind of Companion (1998)
16. Lionheart's Scribe (1999)
17. Whisperings of Magic (2001)
18. Dear Canada: With Nothing But Our Courage: The Loyalist Diary of Mary MacDonald, Johnstown, Quebec, 1783 (2002)
19. Angeline (2004)
20. You Can't Rush a Cat, illustrated by Leslie Elizabeth Watts (2004)
21. The Scarlet Cross: Fourth Book of the Crusades (2006)
22. Dragonmaster (2009)
23. A Desperate Road to Freedom: The Underground Railroad Diary of Julia May Jackson (2009)
24. A Country of Our Own: The Confederation Diary of Rosie Dunn (2013)
