= Kids Top 20 =

Children's television show

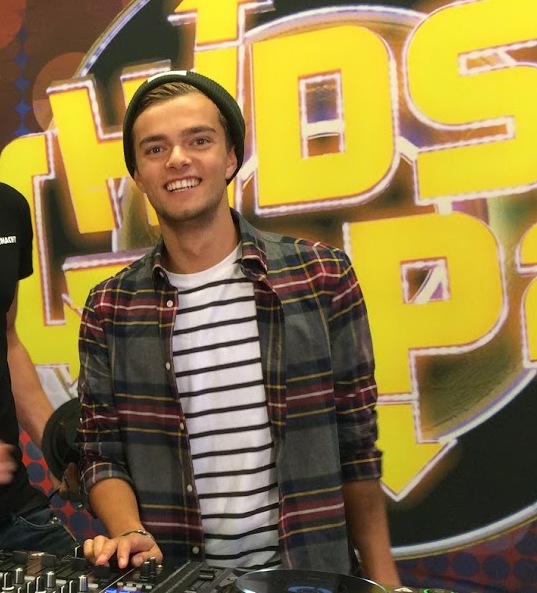
Buddy Vedder on the set of the Zapp Kids Top 20

Kids Top 20 is a television show for kids, around a pop music chart for kids. It was initiated by Fox Kids in 2003 for Dutch television, and was subsequently broadcast by Jetix and from 2007 on NPO 3. International versions were broadcast in Belgium, France, Germany and Finland between 2003 and 2010. As of 2024 it remained on air in the Netherlands, since 2021 presented by Greek-Dutch singer Stefania Liberakakis.

== Sources ==
- Ruysbergh, Jan (2006-02-02). "Ellen viert 100ste Kids Top 20" (in Dutch). Het Nieuwsblad.
- "Monique Smit presenteert 'Kids Top 20'" (in Dutch). TV-Visie. 2007-12-20.
- "Lazarus Media launches Kids Top 20 in the UK" (Press release). Lazarus Media. 2008-08-29. Archived from the original on 2009-12-13. "Kids Top 20 is a weekly half hour live action music show for kids aged 6 to 12. It has been on air for 4 years in the Netherlands, Belgium, Germany and Finland and has recently been launched in France. It is one of the highest ranking shows for kids (average market share of 50% in the target group)."
- "Children's Programming executive Betsy McGowen appointed president, newdance kids, an AECG company". Radioandmusic.com. 2009-02-10. "Targeted to preteens, 6-12, Kids Top 20 is a proven ratings juggernaut in Holland, Belgium, France, Germany and Finland with an average market share of 45% in the target demographic."
- "'Z@pp Kids Top 20' terug van vakantie!" (in Dutch). TV-Visie. 2009-09-04.
- "TV-opname 'Kids Top 20' in Wageningen" (in Dutch). VeenendaalseKrant.nl. 2010-08-31.
