= The Tiny Kite of Eddie Wing =

Children's picture book by writer Maxine Trottier and illustrator Al Van Mil

- Author: Maxine Trottier
- Illustrator: Al Van Mil
- Language: English
- Publisher: Stoddart Publishing
- Publication date: May 1, 1995
- Publication place: Canada
- Media type: Print (hardcover, paperback)
- Pages: 32
- ISBN: 0-7737-2865-1

The Tiny Kite of Eddie Wing is a children's picture book written by Maxine Trottier and illustrated by Al Van Mil, published in 1995 by Stoddart Publishing of Toronto. It tells the story of a boy's love for flying kites and an old man's love for poetry. The book has been reissued.

== Plot summary ==
The story follows a young boy named Eddie Wing who had an extreme love for nothing but kites. His parents ran a flower shop but did not have enough money to buy him the supplies to make a kite. All the kids on the Wing's street were also poor so when Eddie decided to act out flying an imaginary kite they all followed and played along. Each year the town Eddie lived in would host the Festival of Kites, which was Eddie's favorite event. Every year a prize was offered by Old Chan.

Chan was the richest man in the town and everybody looked up to him, especially Eddie. Chan had dreamed of one day becoming a poet, but there had been no time for that as he had to work in the family's restaurant. But now that he was old, he could sit outside the restaurant and make up poems. This year Old Chan decided that the winner of the Kite Festival would have to have the smallest kite.

Eddie did not even have enough money to make a small kite so he did not enter the Festival, but he still attended and flew his imaginary kite. Old Chan noticed Eddie flying his imaginary kite but did not pick him as the winner, instead he brought Eddie back to his restaurant and gave him a parcel of material to make his own dream kite. Eddie made a beautiful kite that he flew from the tallest hill and Old Chan finally wrote down a poem of a young boy flying a tiny kite of dreams.

== Writer ==
Maxine Trottier was born in Grosse Pointe Farms, Michigan, on May 3, 1950. She became a Canadian citizen in 1974, and is a graduate of the University of Western Ontario. She now spends half of a year in Port Stanley, Ontario and Newman's Cove, Newfoundland. She lives with her husband and two dogs.

== Illustrator ==
Alphons "Al" Van Mil was born in Texel, North Holland, in 1950. His family immigrated to Canada where he furthered his studies at the University of Guelph in Ontario. He has been selling and drawing since he graduated in 1972.

== Reception ==
The Tiny Kite of Eddie Wing is the winner of the Canadian Library Association (CLA) Book of the Year Award in 1996.
