= Crusade in Jeans =

1973 children's time travel novel by Thea Beckman

- First edition
- Author: Thea Beckman
- Original title: Kruistocht in spijkerbroek
- Language: Dutch
- Genre: Historical, Alternate history, Children's, Novel
- Publisher: Lemniscaat (Dutch); Scribner (USA)
- Publication date: 1973 (orig.) (Eng trans. February 1976)
- Publication place: Netherlands
- Media type: Print (Hardback & Paperback)
- Pages: 275 p. (hardback edition)
- ISBN: 0-684-14399-2 (hardback edition)
- OCLC: 2113934
- LC Class: PZ7.B38179 Cr

Crusade in Jeans (1973) is a children's novel written by Thea Beckman. It contains a fictional account of the Children's Crusade of 1212, as witnessed by Rudolf Hefting, a boy from the 20th century. The original Dutch title is Kruistocht in spijkerbroek. A film version was released in 2006.

== Plot summary ==
Rudolf "Dolf" Wega is a fifteen-year-old who volunteers for an experiment with a time machine. The experiment goes well, but accidentally Dolf is stranded in the 13th century. He saves the life of Leonardo Fibonacci da Pisa, without realizing who he is, and teaches him Arabic numerals. Together they join the German Children's Crusade, and through his modern-day knowledge, Rudolf manages to save a lot of children from horrible fates. However, his knowledge also leads to accusations of witchcraft.

In the book, two slavers delude a group of children into coming with them with stories of how the innocent shall liberate Jerusalem. Their actual intent is to sell them as slaves for profit. With the aid of his twentieth-century knowledge and skepticism, and the aid of a "magical" device or two (such as a box of matches), the boy manages to keep most of the children alive and eventually gets them to safety.

== Characters ==
Dolf
Born in Amstelveen, his full name is Rudolf Hefting, and at the age of 15 becomes the active leader of the crusade.

Leonardo
Born in Pisa, his full name is Leonardo Fibonacci. He is a very intelligent young man and one of the few historical characters in the book. The historical Fibonacci is often considered one of the greatest mathematicians in the Middle Ages.

Marie
She is eleven years old, as stated by Leonardo. She is a parentless beggar with a very sensitive nature, and, during the crusade, both Dolf and Leonardo grow very fond of her.

Frank
The twelve-year-old son of a tanner from Cologne.

Peter
A strong child around the age of twelve, who, in the Crusade, became responsible for fisheries. After the tragedy in Genoa, his personality became colder.

Hans
His knowledge of the trees seems unlimited, as his father was a woodcutter.

Bertho
A tall and strong boy who felt a strong sense of guilt about his past.

Everard
One of the main hunters, along with Carolus and Bertho. In his life he has seen nothing but forests and hunting parties. He dies bravely in a fight between the farmers of Lombardy.

Dom Thaddeus
A priest from a neighboring village in the city where Dolf was lost who joined the Crusade.

Dom Anselmus and Dom Augustus
Impostors pretending to be monks, and who, under the orders of Boglio, a contact of Anselmus, attempt to sell the children to a slave's market, but fail to do so.

Nicolas
A young shepherd who, deceived by the fake monks, believed to God's chosen one to lead the Children's Crusade.

Carolus
Young nobleman who believes he will be crowned king on his arrival in Jerusalem, but unexpectedly dies, before the arrival in Genoa, from appendicitis - a disease which at that time was fatal. His death was a strong blow on Dolf, who cared for him very much.

Fredo
A robust boy and son of an impoverished knight, he left the crusade before they crossed the alps along with another 800 followers.

Hilda
Hilda von Marburg, daughter of a count, grew up in the palace of her uncle (the archbishop of Cologne), and the supposed "future queen of Jerusalem". During the Crusade, she became in charge of nursing.

Frieda
The daughter of a servant, with much knowledge on berries, herbs and root vegetables.

Gardulf
A baker. With his help, the help of two assistants Frank and Dolf, they made 200 fringes of bread in one night and prevented the children from starving.

Wilhelm
A chubby boy always willing to help Dolf.

== Awards and nominations ==
The book won a Gouden Griffel and the European prize for best historical youth book in 1974, and the Prix de la Divulgation historique in 1976. In 2019 it was selected as the classic in that year's "gift a book" campaign, which made it available in paperback for €2,50.

== Film, TV or theatrical adaptations ==
A movie version directed by Ben Sombogaart went into production in 2005. The film was released in Belgium and the Netherlands on November 15, 2006. It was shown at the Berlin International Film Festival in February 2007, and was released in other regions, in theatres or on DVD between 2008 and 2010.
