= Birthmarks (Ozark Henry album) =

Studio album by Ozark Henry
- Released: 11 September 2001
- Genre: Pop
- Length: 45:06 (65:01, bonus included)
- Label: Sony BMG
- Producer: Ozark Henry

Ozark Henry chronology
This Last Warm Solitude (1998)	Birthmarks (2001)	The Sailor Not the Sea (2004)

Birthmarks is the third album by Ozark Henry.

== Track listing ==
Music and lyrics by Piet Goddaer.

1. "Word up" – 4:39
2. "Rescue" – 3:47
3. "Do you love me" – 4:02
4. "Sweet instigator" – 4:20
5. "Seaside" – 3:30
6. "Intersexual" – 4:17
7. "Rainbow" – 5:30
8. "Tattoo" – 7:00
9. "I'll be rain" – 4:14
10. "This is all I have" – 3:47

CD bonus

1. "Sweet Instigator [Roof Remix]" – 4:15
2. "A Sunzoo Seminar" – 3:46
3. "Rescue [Roof Remix]" – 3:53
4. "Word Up [Roof Remix]" – 4:36
5. "Seaside [Roof Remix]" – 3:25

== Charts ==
=== Weekly charts ===
Chart (2001–2003)	Peak position
Belgian Albums (Ultratop Flanders)	8
Belgian Albums (Ultratop Wallonia)	28

=== Year-end charts ===
Chart (2002)	Position
Belgian Albums (Ultratop Flanders)	18
Chart (2003)	Position
Belgian Albums (Ultratop Flanders)	40

== Certifications ==
Region	Certification	Certified units/sales
Belgium (BEA)	Gold	25,000^{*}
^{*} Sales figures based on certification alone.
