= In Vain (Kim-Lian song) =

Single by Kim-Lian

from the album Just Do It
- Released: 29 April 2006
- Recorded: 2006
- Genre: Pop rock
- Length: 3:32
- Label: Bass Commander Records
- Songwriter(s): Daniel Gibson, Han'some
- Producer(s): Daniël Gibson, Han'some, Anders Bergström

Kim-Lian singles chronology
"Road to Heaven" (2006)	"In Vain" (2006)	"Feel" (2007)

"In Vain" is a song recorded by the Dutch pop rock music singer Kim-Lian. It was released as the second single from her second album Just Do It on 10 October 2006.

== Formats and track listing ==
CD single

1. "In Vain"

Maxi single

1. "In Vain" - 3:32
2. "In Vain" [Guitar Down Mix] - 3:28
3. "In Vain" [Instrumental] - 3:31
4. "Road to Heaven" [Club Remix From Israel] - 4:54

== Charts ==
Chart (2006)	Peak position
Dutch Tip Parade	3
Dutch Single Top 100	33
