= Just Do It (album) =

2006 album by Kim-Lian

Studio album by Kim-Lian
- Released: 28 October 2006
- Recorded: 2005–2006
- Genre: Pop rock
- Label: Bass Commander Records
- Producer: Kim-Lian

Kim-Lian chronology
Balance (2004)	Just Do It (2006)

Just Do It is the second album recorded by the Dutch pop rock music singer Kim-Lian. It was released on 28 October 2006 in the Netherlands. Kim-Lian had recently broke with her label CMM Records in a dispute over the target audience of her music, and the album was produced by her boyfriend Daniel Gibson. Three singles were released before the album: "Road to Heaven", "In Vain", and the download only single "Feel". She was subsequently signed by Bass Commander Records.

== Track listing ==
#	CD Title
1.	"Road to Heaven"
2.	"Stronger"
3.	"Anywhere I Go"
4.	"Should've Kissed You"
5.	"Open Up Your Eyes"
6.	"In Vain"
7.	"Starlight"
8.	"Just Do It"
9.	"Mysterious Beautiful"
10.	"Feed My Demon"
11.	"Riotgirl"
12.	"Come Back to Me"
13.	"Feel"
14.	"Road To Heaven" (DJ Israel Club Remix)
#	DVD Title
1.	"Road to Heaven" [Video]
2.	"In Vain" [Video]
3.	"Road to Heaven" [In Las Vegas] (Making Of)
4.	"In Vain" [Behind The Scenes] (Making Of)
5.	Exclusive Interview with Kim-Lian

== Singles ==
Name	Released	Peak Dutch Charts	Notes
"Road to Heaven"	29 April 2006	28	"Road to Heaven" is the lead single from the album.
"In Vain"	12 October 2006	33	"In Vain" is the second single from the album.
