= Hvelreki =

Studio album by Ozark Henry
- Released: 29 October 2010
- Recorded: Space Mountain Studios, Spain, September 2009
- Genre: Pop
- Length: 62:18
- Label: EMI Music Belgium
- Producer: Youth

Ozark Henry chronology
The Soft Machine (2006)	Hvelreki (2010)	Stay Gold (2013)

Singles from Hvelreki
- 1. "This One's For You" Released: 10 September 2010

Professional ratings
Review scores
Source	Rating
Cutting Edge	3/5 stars
De Morgen	4/5 stars
HUMO	1.5/4 stars

Hvelreki is the sixth studio album of Ozark Henry, released in October 2010. It is the first Ozark Henry album for EMI Music. Hvelreki is an Icelandic phrase that means 'good luck' and literally translates as: 'May a whole whale wash up on your beach.'

The album was preceded by the single "This One's For You", which was released on 10 September 2010. The album also features "Godspeed", a previously released single (which was also on the compilation album A Decade). The version of "Godspeed" on this album is prolonged when compared to the single. A live version of "Godspeed" was also released on the live album Grace.

== Track listing ==
All songs written by Ozark Henry

No.	Title	Length
1.	"Out Of This World"	4:49
2.	"This One's For You"	3:50
3.	"Eventide"	5:13
4.	"Godspeed"	5:59
5.	"Miss You When You're Here"	3:34
6.	"A Night Sea Journey"	5:10
7.	"Air And Fire"	4:26
8.	"Yours And Yours Only"	5:50
9.	"It's In The Air Tonight"	5:03
10.	"Hvelreki"	4:20
11.	"See The Lions"	5:29
12.	"No Hands (Limited Edition or iTunes Album only)"	3:29
13.	"Memento (Limited Edition or iTunes Album only)"	5:04
Total length:		62:18

== Charts ==
=== Weekly charts ===
Chart (2010)	Peak position
Belgian Albums (Ultratop Flanders)	1
Belgian Albums (Ultratop Wallonia)	1
Dutch Albums (Album Top 100)	26

=== Year-end charts ===
Chart (2010)	Position
Belgian Albums (Ultratop Flanders)	22
Belgian Albums (Ultratop Wallonia)	62
Chart (2011)	Position
Belgian Albums (Ultratop Flanders)	29
Belgian Albums (Ultratop Wallonia)	51

== Certifications ==
Region	Certification	Certified units/sales
Belgium (BRMA)	Platinum	30,000^{*}
^{*} Sales figures based on certification alone.
