= The Soft Machine (Ozark Henry album) =

Studio album by Ozark Henry
- Released: 19 September 2006
- Genre: Pop
- Length: 44:18
- Label: Sony BMG
- Producer: Ozark Henry

Ozark Henry chronology
The Sailor not the Sea (2004)	The Soft Machine (2006)	Hvelreki (2010)

Professional ratings
Review scores
Source	Rating
HUMO	2.5/4 stars

The Soft Machine is the fifth studio album of Ozark Henry, the first of his albums to top the charts.

The track "These Days" was released as a single and reached the top 50 of the Ultratop charts, the first of his track releases to do so.

== Track list ==
All songs written by Piet Goddaer

1. "These Days" – 3:32
2. "Christine" – 3:38
3. "We Were Never Alone" – 3:46
4. "Splinter" – 4:18
5. "Play Politics" – 3:28
6. "Weekenders" – 4:03
7. "Echo as Metaphor" – 2:50
8. "Cincinnati" – 3:54
9. "Morpheus" – 3:46
10. "Sun Dance" – 3:37
11. "Le Temps Qui Reste" – 3:37
12. "Jailbird" – 3:56

== Charts ==
=== Weekly charts ===
Chart (2006)	Peak position
Belgian Albums (Ultratop Flanders)	1
Belgian Albums (Ultratop Wallonia)	4
Dutch Albums (Album Top 100)	39

=== Year-end charts ===
Chart (2006)	Position
Belgian Albums (Ultratop Flanders)	4
Belgian Albums (Ultratop Wallonia)	56

Chart (2007)	Position
Belgian Albums (Ultratop Flanders)	47
Belgian Albums (Ultratop Wallonia)	87
