= Crusade in Jeans (film) =

2006 Dutch film

- Film poster
- Directed by: Ben Sombogaart
- Written by: Chris Craps; Jean-Claude Van Rijckeghem
- Based on: Crusade in Jeans by Thea Beckman
- Produced by: Kees Kasander; Bill Haney
- Starring: Johnny Flynn; Stephanie Leonidas
- Cinematography: Reinier van Brummelen
- Edited by: Herman P. Koerts
- Music by: Jurre Haanstra
- Distributed by: Benelux Film Distributors
- Release date: 15 November 2006
- Running time: 130 minutes
- Countries: Netherlands; Belgium; Germany
- Language: English
- Box office: $4.8 million

Crusade in Jeans (Dutch: Kruistocht in spijkerbroek) is a 2006 Dutch film directed by Ben Sombogaart. It is an adaptation of the book Crusade in Jeans by Thea Beckman.

== Plot ==
Dolf is a 15-year-old boy from Rotterdam who plays for the junior national football team. Dolf and his team are playing an important championship game against the Belgian team in the German city of Speyer. They were trailing by a goal, and got the chance to equalise in the final minutes which Dolf blew.

Dolf's mother works in a research centre in Rotterdam where a time machine has been developed. It allows an object, animal or person to be moved to a specified time and place in the past, and to bring them back again. But, a person moving to the past can only return to the present by being at an exact location at an exact time. Furthermore, a special medication is needed daily to stay alive in the past.

Dolf decides to go back in time one day to replay the match, since he regularly visits his mother at the lab, assists with the work, guards know him, the iris scan authorization check lets him pass, and he knows his mother's password to the computer system. However, the activation of the system alarms the guards. Dolf manages to operate the machine just in time before the guards can stop him, but in his haste, he accidentally enters the password instead of the destination date, and consequently travels to the year 1212. He ends up at the location of the present-day football stadium, not far from the city of Speyer, which already existed then.

After being attacked by vagabonds and being saved by a girl named Jenne, Dolf joins Jenne in the Children's Crusade: 8,000 children traveling from Germany to Jerusalem to pray for the city's deliverance from the Muslims. The crusade is led by Nicolaas, a teenaged boy with visions, and an adult priest, Father Anselmus. Although it is a long detour, Anselmus has decreed that the children will travel to Jerusalem via Genoa, where Nicolaas expects the sea to part, so the children can walk to the Holy City. What the children don't know is that Anselmus has secretly planned to sell the children to slave traders in Genoa, instead of bringing them to Jerusalem.

During the crusade, Dolf applies his modern-day knowledge to save the lives of many children, battling disease, kidnappers and hunger. He even saves one of the leaders, Prince Carolus, from drowning. All this helps him gain the respect of the children and Nicolaas. However, Anselmus and his bodyguard Vick are intent on discrediting Dolf and try to destroy his reputation whenever they can. Outside Genoa, they finally succeed in making Nicolaas and the other children believe Dolf is an agent of the devil, who should be executed. Dolf manages to escape his execution at the last moment with the help of Jenne and Carolus and finally uncovers Anselmus' plan to sell the children as slaves.

Meanwhile, Dolf's mother succeeds in sending him a message telling him the date and place of his return, after learning of his deeds and whereabouts in a mediaeval manuscript by Thaddeus, a monk whom Dolf has befriended. Although Dolf and Jenne succeed in getting to the location on time, a fight with the slave traders erupts and Dolf is forced to leave Jenne behind in 1212 and return to the present alone.

Back home, Dolf manages to persuade his mother to let him go back to 1212 in order to get Jenne. His mother agrees and Dolf leaves for 1212 once more, setting a new time and place for his return. In European territories, the film ends here. For American audiences, an extra scene was added in which Dolf has once again returned to the present, this time with Jenne. He is seen replaying the football match he lost in the beginning of the film, with Jenne cheering him on in the crowd.

== Cast ==
- Johnny Flynn as Rudolf 'Dolf' Vega
- Stephanie Leonidas as Jenne
- Emily Watson as Mary Vega, Dolf's mother
- Michael Culkin as Father Anselmus
- Benno Fürmann as Father Thaddeus
- Jake Kedge as Prince Carolus
- Robert Timmins as Nicolas
- Ryan Winsley as Vick
- Jan Decleir as the Count of Rottweil
- Ophelia Lovibond as Isabella
- Catrin Stewart as Cecile
- Herbert Knaup as Carlo Bennatti
- Udo Kier as Dr. Lawrence
- Bert André as Councilman
- Janieck van de Polder as Pepi
- Luke Gell as Bertho
- Adam Smith as Addo

== Filming locations ==
Filming locations included the Netherlands, Belgium, Luxembourg, Hungary, Germany and Croatia.

== Awards ==
- Golden Film for 100,000 visitors in the Netherlands (2006)
- Platinum Film for 400,000 visitors in the Netherlands (2007)
- Golden Calf for Best Feature Film (2007) to Kees Kasander
- Golden Calf for Best Editing (2007) to Herman P. Koerts
