= Thea Beckman =

Dutch author of children's books (1923–2004)

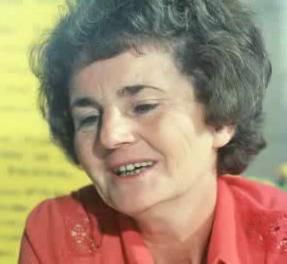
- Beckman in 1974
- Born: 23 July 1923; Rotterdam, Netherlands
- Died: 5 May 2004 (aged 80); Bunnik, Netherlands
- Occupation: Writer
- Writing career
- Genre: Children's novels
- Notable works: Crusade in Jeans; Children of Mother Earth

Theodora Beckmann (née Petie; 23 July 1923 – 5 May 2004), better known by her pen name Thea Beckman, was a Dutch author of children's books.

== Biography ==
At a young age, Beckman knew she wanted to be a writer. As a teenager, she would write numerous stories and would listen to various types of music, ranging from classic to exciting film scores, depending on the kind of scene she was writing.

in her twenties, Beckman studied social psychology, attending the University of Utrecht. In wake of the 1929 economic crisis, her father lost his job and Beckman was glad she had managed to finish her studies, especially after World War II occurred.

As a writer, she intended to use her husband's name of Beckmann as her pseudonym. Her publisher urged her to change it to Beckman with only one "n", to avoid her name from appearing "too German", in wake of Germany's negative reputation after World War II.

Beckman is best known for Crusade in Jeans, a 1973 children's time travel novel for which she was awarded the Gouden Griffel. The book describes a children's crusade in 1212 and was adapted into a movie in 2006. She also received notable attention for her trilogy Children of Mother Earth, which depicted a post-apocalyptic earth where soldiers from societies led by men invade and disrupt a newfound Greenlandic society led by women. Though the book contains feminist themes, Beckman did not consider the book's ideology her own, stating: "People are greedy, aggressive and intolerant." She specifically stated that she did not believe a maternal society would function better than a paternal one.

=== Personal life ===
In 1945, Thea married Dirk Hendrik Beckmann. Their marriage produced three children, two sons Rien and Jerry and a daughter Marianne. Dirk Beckmann died in 1993.

Thea Beckman was not religious and chose not to reveal a political orientation.

She died in her residence in Bunnik of unknown causes in 2004, aged 80.

== Legacy ==
After her death, the Historisch Nieuwsblad (historical newspaper) renamed the "Bontekoe-award" (a prize for the best historical youth book, established in 2003) as the Thea Beckman Award. In 2004, it was awarded to Benny Lindelauf for his book Negen open armen (nine open arms). In 2005, it was given to Belgian authors Jean-Claude van Rijckeghem and Pat Beirs for the novel Jonkvrouw.

== Selected publications ==
The following is a list of her best known novels:

- Met Korilu de Griemel rond (Around the Greemel with Korilu, 1970) (Later renamed to Zwerftocht met Korilu – Wandering with Korilu; Zilveren Griffel 1971)
- Kruistocht in spijkerbroek (Crusade in Jeans; 1973; Gouden Griffel 1974; European award for best historical youth novel 1974; made into a film in 2006) – about the Children's Crusade of 1212
- Mijn vader woont in Brazilië (My father lives in Brazil, 1974)
- The trilogy Geef me de ruimte (Give me space) – about the Hundred Years' War between England and France
  - Geef me de ruimte (Give me space, 1976),
  - Triomf van de verschroeide aarde (Triumph of scorched earth, 1977)
  - Het rad van fortuin (Wheel of fortune, 1978)
- Stad in de storm (City in the Storm, 1979; Zilveren Griffel 1980) – about Utrecht in the Year of Disaster 1672
- Wij zijn wegwerpkinderen (We are throw-away kids, 1980)
- De gouden dolk (The golden dagger, 1982) – about the Second Crusade, 1147–1149
- Hasse Simonsdochter (1983) – about Jan van Schaffelaar's wife
- Wonderkinderen (wonder children, 1984) about two especially gifted children
- The trilogy Kinderen van Moeder Aarde (Children of Mother Earth) a futuristic novel set ten centuries after World War III, describing the struggle between utopian Thule (Greenland, after a climate change made it prosperous) and Baden (militaristic European nation)
  - Kinderen van Moeder Aarde (1985),
  - Het helse paradijs (Hellish Paradise, 1987)
  - Het Gulden Vlies van Thule (The Golden Fleece of Thule, 1989)
- De val van de Vredeborch (Fall of the Freeburgh, 1988)
- Een bos vol spoken (A forest full of ghosts, 1988)
- Het wonder van Frieswijck (The miracle of Frieswijck, 1991)
- De stomme van Kampen (The Mute of Kampen, 1992) – about the mute painter Hendrick Avercamp
- De doge-ring van Venetië (The Doge-ring of Venice, 1994) – about a trip to Venice to obtain an important relic for an abbey.
- Saartje Tadema (1996) – about an orphan girl in the Amsterdam orphanage
- Vrijgevochten (Fought free, 1998) – about a sailor boy who is captured as a slave
- Gekaapt! (Hijacked!, 2003)
