= Geoffrey Bilson Award =

Canadian literary award

The Geoffrey Bilson Award for Historical Fiction for Young People is a Canadian literary award that goes to the best work of historical fiction written for youth each year. The award is named after Geoffrey Bilson, a writer of historical fiction for youth and a history professor at the University of Saskatchewan who died suddenly in 1987.

The Geoffrey Bilson Award is selected by a jury chosen by the Canadian Children's Book Centre. Award winners must be Canadian authors, and the winning novel must have been published in the previous calendar year. Each year's winner receives a $1000 (C$) prize.

The award is one of several presented by the Canadian Children's Book Centre each year; others include the Marilyn Baillie Picture Book Award, the Norma Fleck Award for Canadian Children's Non-Fiction and the TD Canadian Children's Literature Award.

== Honourees ==
Geoffrey Bilson Award winners and finalists
Year	Author	Title	Result	Ref.
1988	Carol Matas	Lisa	Winner	
1988	Bill Freeman	Danger on the Tracks	Finalist	
1988	Margaret Maloney, illustrated by Lazlo Gal	The Goodman of Ballengeich	Finalist	
1988	Bernice Thurman Hunter	Lamplighter	Finalist	
1988	Mary Razzell	Salmonberry Wine	Finalist	
1988	Myra Paperny	Take A Giant Step	Finalist	
1989	Martyn Godfrey	Mystery in the Frozen Lands	Winner	
1989	Ann Blades	Moses, Me and Murder	Finalist	
1989	Dorothy Perkyns	Rachel's Revolution	Finalist	
1989	Robert Sutherland	Son of the Hounds	Finalist	
1990	Kit Pearson	The Sky is Falling	Winner	
1990	Kevin Major	Blood Red Ochre	Finalist	
1990	Carol Matas	Jesper	Finalist	
1990	Peter Cumming, illustrated by P. John Burden	Mogul and Me	Finalist	
1990	Constance Horne	Nykola and Granny	Finalist	
1990	Paul Yee, illustrated by Simon Ng	Tales From Gold Mountain	Finalist	
1991	Marianne Brandis	The Sign of the Scales	Winner	
1991	Jan Hudson	Dawn Rider	Finalist	
1991	Catherine Lalonde and Louise Burchell, illustrated by Carol Sargent	Eliza’s Best Wednesday	Finalist	
1991	Lyn Cook	The Hiding Place	Finalist	
1991	Barbara Smucker	Incredible Jumbo	Finalist	
1991	Elona Malterre	The Last Wolf of Ireland	Finalist	
1991	Joyce Barkhouse, illustrated by Henry Van der Linde	Pit Pony	Finalist	
1991	Barbara Greenwood	Spy in the Shadows	Finalist	
1992	Award deferred			
1993	Celia Barker Lottridge	Ticket to Curlew	Winner	
1993	John Ibbitson	Jeremy's War 1812	Finalist	
1993	Ainslie Manson, illustrated by Ann Blades	A Dog Came, Too	Finalist	
1993	Joyce Barkhouse	Yesterday's Children	Finalist	
1994	Kit Pearson	The Lights Go On Again	Winner	
1994	Carol Matas	Daniel's Story	Finalist	
1994	John Ibbitson	The Night Hazel Come To Town	Finalist	
1994	Margaret Bunel Edwards, illustrated by Linda Potts	The Ocean Between	Finalist	
1994	David Richards	Soldier Boys	Finalist	
1995	Joan Clark	The Dream Carvers	Winner	
1995	Carol Matas	The Burning Time	Finalist	
1995	Jean Booker	Ellen's Secret	Finalist	
1995	Jean Little	His Banner Over Me	Finalist	
1995	Sharon Gibson Palmero	The Lie That Had to Be	Finalist	
1995	Connie Brummel Crook	Nellie L.	Finalist	
1995	Lillian Boraks-Nemetz	The Old Brown Suitcase: A Teenager's Story of War and Peace	Finalist	
1995	Dorothy Perkyn	Signal Across the Sea	Finalist	
1995	Hazel Hutchins	Within a Painted Past	Finalist	
1996	Marianne Brandis	Rebellion: A Novel of Upper Canada	Winner	
1996	Bernice Thurman Hunter	Amy's Promise	Finalist	
1996	Eva Wiseman	A Place Not Home	Finalist	
1996	Judith Silverthorne	The Secret of Sentinel Rock	Finalist	
1996	Barbara K. Nickel	The Secret Wish of Nannerl Mozart	Finalist	
1996	Martha Attema	A Time to Choose	Finalist	
1996	Constance Horne, illustrated by Linda Heslop	Trapped by Coal	Finalist	
1997	Janet McNaughton	To Dance at the Palais Royale	Winner	
1997	Carol Matas	After the War	Finalist	
1997	Jean Little	The Belonging Place	Finalist	
1997	Dayle Campbell Gaetz	The Golden Rose	Finalist	
1997	Janet Lunn	The Hollow Tree	Finalist	
1997	Barbara Haworth-Attard	Home Child	Finalist	
1997	Linda Holeman	Promise Song	Finalist	
1997	Monica Hughes	The Seven Magpies	Finalist	
1997	Karleen Bradford	Shadows of a Sword	Finalist	
1997	Susan E. Merritt	The Stone Orchard	Finalist	
1997	Alison Acheson	Thunder Ice	Finalist	
1997	Celia Barker Lottridge	Wings to Fly	Finalist	
1998	Irene N. Watts	Good-Bye Marianne	Winner	
1998	John Wilson	Across Frozen Seas	Finalist	
1998	Elaine Breault Hammond	Beyond the Waterfall	Finalist	
1998	Sharon Stewart	The Dark Tower	Finalist	
1998	Carol Matas	The Garden	Finalist	
1998	Dayle Campbell Gaetz	Living Freight	Finalist	
1998	Janet McNaughton	Make or Break Spring	Finalist	
1998	Connie Brummel Crook	Nellie's Quest	Finalist	
1998	Bill Freeman	Prairie Fire!	Finalist	
1998	Eric Walters	War of the Eagles	Finalist	
1998	James Heneghan	Wish Me Luck	Finalist	
1999	Iain Lawrence	The Wreckers	Winner	
1999	Joan Weir	The Brideship	Finalist	
1999	Ann Walsh	The Doctor's Apprentice: A Barkerville Mystery	Finalist	
1999	Susan Vande Griek, illustrated by Mary Jane Gerber	The Gift for Ampato	Finalist	
1999	Carol Matas	Greater Than Angels	Finalist	
1999	Eric Walters	The Hydrofoil Mystery	Finalist	
1999	Bernice Thurman Hunter	Janey's Choice	Finalist	
1999	Julie Johnston	The Only Outcast	Finalist	
1999	Kathy Kacer	The Secret of Gabi's Dresser	Finalist	
1999	Judi Coburn	The Shacklands	Finalist	
2000	Deferred to the following year			
2001	Sharon E. McKay	Charlie Wilcox	Winner	
2001	Troon Harrison	A Bushel of Light	Finalist	
2001	James Heneghan	The Grave	Finalist	
2001	Carol Matas	In My Enemy's House	Finalist	
2001	Barbara Haworth-Attard	Love-Lies-Bleeding	Finalist	
2002	Virginia Frances Schwartz	If I Just Had Two Wings	Winner	
2002	Brian Doyle	Mary Ann Alice	Finalist	
2002	Connie Colker Steiner, illustrated by Denis Rodier	Shoes for Amélie	Finalist	
2002	Maxine Trottier	Under a Shooting Star	Finalist	
2002	Carol Matas	The War Within	Finalist	
2003	Joan Clark	The Word for Home	Winner	
2003	Deborah Ellis	A Company of Fools	Finalist	
2003	Irene N. Watts	Finding Sophie	Finalist	
2003	Barbara Haworth-Attard	Irish Chain	Finalist	
2003	Linda Holeman	Search of the Moon King's Daughter	Finalist	
2004	Brian Doyle	Boy O'Boy	Winner	
2004	Kevin Major, illustrated by David Blackwood	Anne and Seamus	Finalist	
2004	Jean Little	Brothers Far From Home: The World War I Diary of Eliza Bates	Finalist	
2004	Priscilla Galloway	The Courtesan's Daughter	Finalist	
2004	Ted Stenhouse	A Dirty Deed	Finalist	
2005	Michel Noël	Good for Nothing	Winner	
2005	Karleen Bradford	Angeline	Finalist	
2005	Sharon E. McKay	Esther	Finalist	
2005	Anne Laurel Carter	Last Chance Bay	Finalist	
2005	Carol Matas	Play Ball!	Finalist	
2006	Pamela Porter	The Crazy Man	Winner	
2006	Maxine Trottier	The Death of My Country: The Plains of Abraham Diary of Geneviève Aubuchon	Finalist	
2006	Barbara Haworth-Attard	Forget-Me-Not	Finalist	
2006	John Wilson	Four Steps to Death	Finalist	
2006	Carol Matas	Turned Away: The World War II Diary of Devorah Bernstein	Finalist	
2007	Eva Wiseman	Kanada	Winner	
2007	Connie Brummel Crook	Meyers' Rebellion	Finalist	
2007	Janet Lunn	A Rebel's Daughter: The 1837 Rebellion Diary of Arabella Stevenson	Finalist	
2007	Penny Draper	Terror at Turtle Mountain	Finalist	
2007	John Wilson	Where Soldiers Lie	Finalist	
2008	Christopher Paul Curtis	Elijah of Buxton	Winner	
2008	John Wilson	The Alchemist's Dream	Finalist	
2008	Shane Peacock	Eye of the Crow: The Boy Sherlock Holmes, His First Case	Finalist	
2008	Henry T. Aubin	Rise of the Golden Cobra	Finalist	
2008	Shannon Cowan	Tin Angel	Finalist	
2009	John Ibbitson	The Landing	Winner	
2009	Jack Mitchell	The Ancient Ocean Blues	Finalist	
2009	Melanie Little	The Apprentice's Masterpiece: A Story of Medieval Spain	Finalist	
2009	Shenaaz Nanji	Child of Dandelions	Finalist	
2009	Caroline Pignat	Greener Grass: The Famine Years	Finalist	
2010	Shane Peacock	Vanishing Girl	Winner	
2010	Laura Best	Bitter, Sweet	Finalist	
2010	John Wilson	Crusade	Finalist	
2010	Barbara Haworth-Attard	Haunted	Finalist	
2010	Nancy Hartry	Watching Jimmy	Finalist	
2011	Valerie Sherrard	The Glory Wind	Winner	
2011	Jean Little	Exiles from the War: The War Guests Diary of Charlotte Mary Twiss	Finalist	
2011	Marthe Jocelyn	Folly	Finalist	
2011	Martha Brooks	Queen of Hearts	Finalist	
2011	Caroline Pignat	Wild Geese	Finalist	
2012	Kate Cayley	The Hangman in the Mirror	Winner	
2012	Pamela Porter	I’ll Be Watching	Finalist	
2012	John Wilson	Shot at Dawn: World War I	Finalist	
2012	Kenneth Oppel	This Dark Endeavour: The Apprenticeship of Victor Frankenstein	Finalist	
2012	Kit Pearson	The Whole Truth	Finalist	
2013	Elizabeth Stewart	The Lynching of Louie Sam	Winner	
2013	Gillian Chan	I Am Canada: A Call to Battle	Finalist	
2013	Marsha Forchuk Skrypuch	Making Bombs for Hitler	Finalist	
2013	Amy McAuley	Violins of Autumn	Finalist	
2013	Pat Bourke	Yesterday’s Dead	Finalist	
2014	Karen Bass	Graffiti Knight	Winner	
2014	Don Cummer	Brothers at War	Finalist	
2014	Julie Johnston	Little Red Lies	Finalist	
2014	Caroline Stellings	The Manager	Finalist	
2014	Philip Roy	Me & Mr. Bell	Finalist	
2015	Marsha Forchuk Skrypuch	Dance of the Banished	Winner	
2015	Patrick Bowman	Arrow Through the Axes	Finalist	
2015	Caroline Pignat	The Gospel Truth	Finalist	
2015	Marsha Forchuk Skrypuch	Underground Soldier	Finalist	
2015	Caroline Pignat	Unspeakable	Finalist	
2016	Karen Bass	Uncertain Soldier	Winner	
2016	Kelley Armstrong	The Unquiet Past	Finalist	
2016	Sara Henstra	Mad Miss Mimic	Finalist	
2016	Gisela Tobien Sherman	The Farmerettes	Finalist	
2016	Frieda Wishinsky, illustrated by Willow Dawson	Avis Dolphin	Finalist	
2017	Kevin Sands	The Mark of the Plague	Winner	
2017	Kenneth Oppel	Every Hidden Thing	Finalist	
2017	Arushi Raina	When Morning Comes	Finalist	
2017	Ellen Schwartz	Heart of a Champion	Finalist	
2017	Caroline Stellings	Freedom’s Just Another Word	Finalist	
2018	Kevin Sands	The Assassin's Curse	Winner	
2018	Heather Smith	The Agony of Bun O’Keefe	Finalist	
2018	Julie Lawson	A Blinding Light	Finalist	
2018	Heather Camlot	Clutch	Finalist	
2018	Uma Krishnaswami	Step Up to the Plate, Maria Singh	Finalist	
2019	Christopher Paul Curtis	The Journey of Little Charlie	Winner	
2019	Marsha Forchuk Skrypuch	Don't Tell the Enemy	Finalist	
2019	Beryl Young	Miles to Go	Finalist	
2019	Jacqueline Halsey	Piper	Finalist	
2019	Kathy Kacer	The Sound of Freedom	Finalist	
2020	Tina Athaide	Orange for the Sunsets	Winner	
2020	Virginia Frances Schwartz	Among the Fallen	Finalist	
2020	Kit Pearson	Be My Love	Finalist	
2020	Lisa Harrington	The Big Dog	Finalist	
2020	Harriet Zaidman	City on Strike	Finalist	
2020	Monique Polak	Room for One More	Finalist	
2021	Jordyn Taylor	The Paper Girl of Paris	Winner	
2021	Heather Smith	Barry Squires, Full Tilt	Finalist	
2021	Kathy Kacer	The Brushmaker’s Daughter	Finalist	
2021	Nadine Neema and Archie Beaverho (illus.)	Journal of a Travelling Girl	Finalist	
2021	Heather Stemp	Under Amelia’s Wing	Finalist	
2022	Harriet Zaidman	Second Chances	Winner	
2022	Barbara Nickel	Dear Peter, Dear Ulla	Finalist	
2022	Leslie Gentile	Elvis, Me, and the Lemonade Stand Summer	Finalist	
2022	J. Torres and David Namisato (illus.)	Stealing Home	Finalist	
2022	Marsha Forchuk Skrypuch	Traitors Among Us	Finalist	
2023	Kim Spencer	Weird Rules to Follow	Winner	
2023	Kathy Kacer	Hidden on the High Wire: A Holocaust Remembrance Book for Young Readers	Finalist	
2023	Jane Baird Warren	How to Be a Goldfish	Finalist	
2023	Lori Weber	The Ribbon Leaf	Finalist	
2023	Salma Hussain	The Secret Diary of Mona Hasan	Finalist	
2024	Jessica Outram	Bernice and the Georgian Bay Gold	Winner	
2024	Julie Lawson	Out of the Dark	Finalist	
2024	Kate Leth	Mall Goth	Finalist	
2024	Tho Pham and Sandra MacTavish	The Cricket War	Finalist	
2024	Amanda West Lewis	Focus. Click. Wind.	Finalist	
2025	Shari Green	Song of Freedom, Song of Dreams	Winner	
2025	Rosena Fung	Age 16	Finalist	
2025	Anna Rosner	Eyes on the Ice	Finalist	
2025	Jennifer Maruno	The Go-Between	Finalist	
2025	Tina Athaide	Wings to Soar	Finalist	
2026	Kim Spencer	I Won’t Feel This Way Forever	Finalist	
2026	Jacqueline Halsey	Joe and the Wreck of the Tribune	Finalist	
2026	Gregor Craigie	Saving Wolfgang	Finalist	
2026	Michelle Kadarusman	Seabird	Finalist	
2026	Carol Matas	A Storm Unleashed	Finalist	
