= Red Deer Press =

Canadian book publishing company

- Parent company: Fitzhenry & Whiteside
- Predecessor: Red Deer College Press
- Founded: 1973
- Founder: Gary Botting
- Country of origin: Canada
- Headquarters location: Leaside, Ontario
- Publication types: Books
- Official website: www.reddeerpress.com

Red Deer Press is a Canadian book publisher located in Leaside, Ontario. It issues trade titles in children's fiction, literary fiction, science fiction, poetry, drama, belles-lettres, and creative nonfiction.

Red Deer Press was founded in 1973 by Red Deer College (RDC) English and creative writing instructor Dr. Gary Botting as a vehicle for aspiring poets in the college's fledgling creative writing program, but it quickly expanded to publishing non-fiction titles and children's books. Initially subsidized by Red Deer College, in 2005, Red Deer Press was acquired by Toronto-based Fitzhenry & Whiteside.

Red Deer Press' books have received several literary awards over the years. For instance, Caroline Pignat's Greener Grass: The Famine Years won the 2009 Governor General's Award for English-language children's literature.
