= Hiding Edith =

2008 non-fiction children's book by Kathy Kacer

- Author: Kathy Kacer
- Publisher: Second Story Press
- Publication date: January 1, 2006
- ISBN: 978-1-897-18706-7
- OCLC: 62895168

Hiding Edith is a 2006 non-fiction children's book written by Kathy Kacer and published by Second Story Press. A French translation was published in 2012 by Flammarion as Le Secret d'Édith.

The book describes the story of Edith Schwalb, a young Jewish girl hiding from the Nazis in France during World War II. Edith was born in Vienna, Austria, in 1932. She and her family left Austria as World War II approached and eventually made their way to southern France. In 1941, Edith's mother sent her and her younger brother Gaston to the Moissac Jewish Children's Home for protection. The home was managed by Shatta and Bouli Simon, members of the Jewish Scouts of France. There Edith attended the local school alongside non-Jewish pupils.

A central theme of the book is that the townspeople knew the children at the home were Jewish and protected them. It portrays their survival as a collective effort involving the Simons, the mayor, town hall workers, the Jewish scouts and the population of the town and the area around Moissac. Along with the other children she learned practical scouting skills. When warnings of raids by the Vichy French police or the Gestapo were shared with Shatta and Bouli by local town hall workers, Shatta took Edith and the other children into the wooded countryside in what the book calls Camps volants, "Flying Camps," in which they changed their camp site daily until they could safely return to the home.

Eventually the home became too dangerous. Edith was moved to a Catholic boarding school under a false identity, and later to a farm. The book draws an emotional distinction between Moissac, where she could keep her own name among Jewish children, and subsequent hiding places where she had to conceal who she was. After the war, she returned to Moissac with Gaston and remained there, at the vocational training centre set up by the Jewish scouts, until 1949. She later emigratred to Canada.

== Awards and honours ==
- Norma Fleck Award for Canadian Children's Non-Fiction finalist (2006)
- Hackmatack Children's Choice Award for English Non-Fiction (2008)
