= Geoffrey Bilson =

Welsh Canadian academic and author

- Born: January 27, 1938; Cardiff, Wales
- Died: July 25, 1987 (aged 49); Saskatoon, Canada
- Occupations: Academic; professor; author
- Years active: 1964–1987 (Academic tenure)
- Children: 2

Academic background
- Education: Aberystwyth University; University of Omaha; Stanford University

Academic work
- Discipline: History
- Institutions: University of Saskatchewan
- Main interests: North American historical events, cholera, immigrant healthcare, The Guest Children (child evacuees)
- Notable works: A Darkened House: Cholera in 19th Century Canada (1980), Goodbye Sarah (1981), Death Over Montreal (1982), Hockeybat Harris (1984), The Guest Children (1988, posthumous)

Geoffrey Bilson (27 January 1938 – 25 July 1987) was a Welsh Canadian academic and author. Between 1964 and 1987, Bilson worked for the University of Saskatchewan in their history department as a professor. During this time period, Bilson primarily released children's books while also publishing non-fiction books. Some of the topics that Bilson wrote about include the Boston Massacre, cholera and the Winnipeg general strike. Following his 1987 death, his non-fiction book titled The Guest Children was released in 1988. The following year, the Geoffrey Bilson Award was first presented by the Canadian Children's Book Centre.

== Early life and education ==
Bilson's birth occurred at Cardiff, Wales, on 27 January 1938. During his childhood, Bilson lived in Liverpool. After he became interested in journalism, Bilson worked in newspaper publishing and editing while completing his education. For his post-secondary education, Bilson first attended Aberystwyth University. Throughout the 1960s to 1970s, Bilson also went to the University of Omaha and Stanford University. While at Omaha during 1961, the University of California, Berkeley, gave Bilson a graduate assistant position.

== Career ==
=== Academics and publications ===
During his tenure between 1964 and 1987, Bilson worked at the University of Saskatchewan as a professor. For his academic career, Bilson focused on historical events throughout North America. While at Saskatchewan, his articles about cholera were released in the 1970s and 1980s. For a 1984 book by Charles G. Roland, Bilson wrote about Canadian healthcare for immigrants. The following year, Bilson's journal article on Frederick Montizambert was published. Bilson had continued studying healthcare for immigrants before he died in 1987.

=== Writings ===
As a writer, Bilson had a book in 1977 about the 1770 Boston Massacre. Bilson's book, A Darkened House: Cholera in 19th Century Canada, was made available in 1980. When his kids left the country for a vacation, Bilson decided to become a children's author. His first two written books for children were released out of order. In 1981, Bilson's first published book for children was Goodbye Sarah. After Bilson converted his 1919 Winnipeg general strike work into a stage production, Goodbye Sarah was performed in 1984.

In 1982, Bilson continued his children's writings with Death Over Montreal. To make the book, Bilson used his previous research he performed for A Darkened House. In Death Over Montreal, Bilson wrote about a Scottish family experiencing cholera after moving to Canada. With his 1984 children's work titled Hockeybat Harris, Bilson wrote about a Guest Child who moved from Great Britain to live in Canada during World War II. In the late 1980s, Bilson had begun writing a children's book about "a sort of conventional child who wants things to go right". Bilson's non-fiction book, The Guest Children: The Story of the British Child Evacuees Sent to Canada during World War II, was posthumously released in 1988.

== Writing style and themes ==
While raising a family, Bilson used ideas provided by his children to create bedtime stories. To create his children's books, Bilson handwrote his manuscripts before he typed them up. During the editing stage, he wrote on his physical copies. For his children's books, Bilson used "lesser-known...events and showed how they influenced the lives of young teenagers."

Bilson wrote the draft of his cholera book for children under the title of Yellow Flags in Montreal. The title was changed to Death Over Montreal after a book with a similar name was released before Bilson's book. In his written draft, Bilson "wanted both parents to die from cholera" in the book. He later edited his book to only include the death of the main character's father. To create The Guest Children, Bilson conducted interviews with fourteen former Guest Children and incorporated their recollections. He also added the background of the Overseas Reception Board project for the book.

== Death and personal life ==
Prior to his death, Bilson was experiencing brain cancer. He had two children during his marriage. On 25 July 1987, Bilson's death occurred in Saskatoon.

== Honours ==
A year after his death, the Canadian Children's Book Centre began presenting the Geoffrey Bilson Award. During the early 1990s, the Geoffrey Bilson Memorial Lecture was created. Leading up to the 2020s, some of the scheduled speakers for the Saskatchewan lecture included Janet Lunn and Bathsheba Demuth.
