= Kathy Kacer =

Canadian author (born 1954)

- Born: 6 September 1954 (age 72); Toronto, Ontario, Canada
- Occupations: Writer, illustrator
- Spouse: Ian Epstein
- Children: 2, including Jake
- Writing career
- Genres: Fiction and nonfiction children's books
- Subject: The Holocaust
- Notable work: Hiding Edith (2006)

Kathy Kacer (born 6 September 1954) is a Canadian author of fiction and non-fiction for children about The Holocaust, and has written one adult fiction book (Restitution). She has won several awards and her books have been translated into a variety of languages (e.g. Die Kinder aus Theresienstadt (ISBN 9783473542536), German translation of Clara's War and ちいさな命がくれた勇気 (ISBN 9784072491072), Japanese translation of The Underground Reporters). As well as writing, she speaks to children about the Holocaust, and to educators about teaching sensitive issues to young children.

== Early life ==
Kacer was born in Toronto to Jewish parents, Gabriela (née Offenberg) and Arthur Kacer, who were both Holocaust survivors, her father having been in a concentration camp and her mother living in hiding.

== Personal life ==
Kacer is married to lawyer Ian Epstein. They have two children, Broadway talent Gabi Epstein and actor and singer Jake Epstein. Kacer has a master's degree in psychology and worked with troubled teenagers before becoming a full-time writer in 1998.

== Awards and honours ==
- 2008 National Jewish Book Award for The Diary of Laura's Twin
- 2009 The Louis L. Lockshin and Brenda Freedman Award, the Youth award of the Canadian Jewish Book Awards, for The Diary of Laura's Twin
- 2009 Yad Vashem Award for Children's Holocaust Literature for Hiding Edith
- Finalist in the Norma Fleck Award in 2005 (The Underground Reporters), 2006 (Hiding Edith) and 2010 (Whispers from the Ghetto)
- And several provincial awards and shortlistings for other awards

== Works ==
=== Children's fiction ===
- The Secret of Gabi's Dresser (1999, Second Story Press, ISBN 9781896764153), pre-teen fiction

Kacer's mother's experiences included hiding in a dresser, or cupboard

- Night Spies (2003, Second Story Press, ISBN 9781896764702), "pre-teen non-fiction"

A sequel to The Secret of Gabi's Dresser

- Clara's War (2001, Second Story Press, ISBN 9781896764429)

Based around true stories of the opera Brundibár produced in Theresienstadt

- The Diary of Laura's Twin (2008, Second Story Press, ISBN 9781897187395)

A contemporary Jewish girl is "twinned" with a girl of the same age in the Warsaw Ghetto through her diary

- Margit (Our Canadian Girl series, Penguin Books Canada), pre-teen fiction

The central character, Margit, has fled with her mother from the Nazis in Czechoslovakia to Canada

- Home Free
- A Bit of Love and a Bit of Luck
- Open Your Doors
- A Friend in Need

=== Children's nonfiction ===
- The Underground Reporters (2004, Toronto: Second Story Press, ISBN 9781896764856)

A group of Jewish children in hiding in Czechoslovakia created a local newspaper, Klepy

- Hiding Edith (2006, Second Story Press, ISBN 9781897187067), pre-teen nonfiction

The story of Edith Schwab and other Jewish children being hidden and protected in a French village

- To Hope and Back: The Journey of the St. Louis (2010, Second Story, ISBN 9781897187968) (Note: Kacer identifies four books published through 2014 (tagged here) as "Young Adult Non-Fiction". Generally the list of publications she maintains as a member of CANSCAIP distinguishes Pre-Teen, Young Adult, and Adult; Fiction and Non-Fiction.)

The story of the 1939 voyage of the MS St. Louis, when German Jewish refugees were turned away from Cuba, the US and Canada

- Whispers trilogy, co-written with Sharon McKay

Collections of personal stories from the time of the Holocaust

- Whispers from the Ghettos (2009, Puffin Canada, ISBN 9780143312512)
- Whispers from the Camps (2009, Puffin Canada, ISBN 9780143312529)
- Whispers in Hiding (2010, Puffin Canada, ISBN 9780143312536)

- We Are Their Voice: Young people respond to the Holocaust (2011, Second Story)
- Shanghai Escape (2014, Second Story)
- The Magician of Auschwitz (2014, Second Story)

=== Adult fiction ===
- Restitution: A family's fight for their heritage lost in the Holocaust (ISBN 978-1897187753)
