= Alison Acheson =

Canadian writer of fiction

Alison Acheson is a Canadian writer of fiction for adults and children.

== Biography ==
Acheson was born in Vancouver, British Columbia. In her youth she studied through both public school and correspondence school. She left school just before her sixteenth birthday, and worked as a hairdresser, before enrolling in Langara College and the University of British Columbia to become a Bachelor of Arts and subsequently a Master of Fine Arts.

Acheson has taught writing for children and pedagogy in the MFA program at UBC, and continues to teach extension courses in creative writing at the University of British Columbia and Simon Fraser University. as well as from her own writing workshop site.

Acheson has three sons, with whom she lives in her home in the Lower Mainland of British Columbia. Her husband, Marty Hatlelid, died April 10, 2016. Acheson's memoir, Dance Me to the End: Ten Months and Ten Days with ALS, describes his diagnosis of amyotrophic lateral sclerosis and the final months of his life, and was a bestseller in British Columbia.

== Books and publications ==
In 1996, Coteau Books published Acheson's first book, Thunder Ice. Set in Ontario in the year 1870, it concerns the friendship of two cousins whose respective home towns are at conflict over the pending railway contract. Thunder Ice was a finalist for the Manitoba Young Readers award, the Red Cedar award, and the Geoffrey Bilson Award for Historical Fiction for Young Readers.

Subsequent publications include:

- The Half-Pipe Kidd, 1997, Coteau Books, for grades 5–9
- Learning to Live Indoors, 1998, Porcupine's Quill, short stories for adults
- Mud Girl, 2006, Coteau Books, for teens. A finalist for the Canadian Library Association’s Young Adult Book of the Year distinction in 2006
- Grandpa’s Music: A Story About Alzheimer’s, 2009, Albert Whitman & Co., an IBBY List for Children
- Molly's Cue, 2010, Coteau Books, for grade 5–9
- The Cul-De-Sac Kids, 2012 Tradewind Books, grades 2–3
- Dance Me to the End, 2019, Brindle & Glass, adult memoir
