= John Wilson (Canadian writer) =

Canadian author (born 1951)

- Born: John Alexander Wilson; August 3, 1951 (age 75); Edinburgh, Scotland
- Education: University of St. Andrews (BSc, 1975)
- Occupation: Novelist
- Spouse: Jenifer Mary Wilson
- Children: 3
- Writing career
- Period: 1987 to present
- Genres: Historical Fiction, Non-fiction
- Notable work: Four Steps to Death
- Website: johnwilsonauthor.com

John Alexander Wilson (born August 3, 1951, in Edinburgh, Scotland) is a Canadian author of historical fiction and non-fiction. He is the author of over 30 books, 300 articles and essays, and 30 poems.

== Biography ==
Wilson was born in Edinburgh, Scotland on August 3, 1951, to James Annan and Evelyn Victoria Marguerite Wilson. He grew up on the Island of Skye, and in Paisley.

In 1975, Wilson received a Bachelor of Science with honours in geology from the University of St Andrews. After graduation, he worked as a geologist in Zimbabwe before moving to Canada. For nine years, he worked for the Alberta Geological Survey in Edmonton.

In 1991, Wilson began writing full-time.

Wilson now lives in Lantzville on Vancouver Island. He is married to Jenifer Mary Wilson and has three children: Sarah, Fiona, and Iain.

== Awards and honours ==
A Soldier's Sketchbook and Death on the River are Junior Library Guild selections.

In 2017, the Chicago Public Library named A Soldier's Sketchbook one of the best Informational Books for Older Readers of the year.

Awards for Wilson's writing
Year	Title	Award	Result	Ref.
1998	Across Frozen Seas	Geoffrey Bilson Award	Finalist	
1998	Across Frozen Seas	Sheila A. Egoff Children's Literature Prize	Finalist	
2002	Righting Wrongs	Norma Fleck Award	Finalist	
2004	Discovering the Arctic	Norma Fleck Award	Finalist	
2004	Dancing Elephants and Floating Continents	Sheila A. Egoff Children's Literature Prize	Finalist	
2005	Flames of the Tiger	Manitoba Young Readers' Choice Award	Nominee	
2006	Four Steps to Death	Geoffrey Bilson Award	Finalist	
2006	Four Steps to Death	Sheila A. Egoff Children's Literature Prize	Finalist	
2007	The Alchemist's Dream	Governor General's Award for English-language children's literature	Finalist	
2007	Four Steps to Death	Manitoba Young Readers' Choice Award	Nominee	
2007	Red Goodwin	Forest of Reading Red Maple Award	Finalist	
2007	Where Soldiers Lie	Geoffrey Bilson Award	Finalist	
2008	The Alchemist's Dream	Geoffrey Bilson Award	Finalist	
2008	The Alchemist's Dream	Sheila A. Egoff Children's Literature Prize	Finalist	
2008	Where Soldiers Lie	Forest of Reading Red Maple Award	Finalist	
2010	Crusade	Geoffrey Bilson Award	Finalist	
2012	Shot at Dawn	Geoffrey Bilson Award	Finalist	
2012	Written in Blood	Manitoba Young Readers' Choice Award	Nominee	
2016	Wings of War	Manitoba Young Readers' Choice Award	Nominee	

== Publications ==
=== Fiction ===
- Across Frozen Seas (1997)
- Adrift in Time (2003)
- Dancing Elephants and Floating Continents: The Story of Canada Beneath Your Feet (2003)
- Ghosts of James Bay (2006)
- Red Goodwin (2006)
- The Alchemist's Dream (2007)
- Lost Cause (2012)
- The Ruined City (2018)
- The Third Act (2018)

==== Caught in Conflict collection ====
- Lost in Spain (1999)
- And in the Morning... (2002)
- Flames of the Tiger (2003)
- The Flags of War (2004)
- Battle Scars (2005)
- Four Steps to Death (2005)
- Where Soldiers Lie (2007)
- Germania (2008)
- Death on the River (2009)

==== Desert Legends trilogy ====
- Written in Blood (2010)
- Ghost Moon (2011)
- Victorio's War (2012)

==== Heretic's Secret trilogy ====
- Crusade / Heretic (2009)
- Quest / Grail (2010)
- Rebirth (2013)

==== I Am Canada books ====
- Shot at Dawn: World War I, Allan McBride, France, 1917 (2011)
- Graves of Ice (2014)

==== Steve series ====
1. The Missing Skull (2016)
2. Lost Cause (2012)
3. Broken Arrow (2014)

==== Stolen duo ====
- Stolen (2013)
- Bones (2014)

==== Tales of War trilogy ====
- Wings of War (2014)
- Dark Terror (2015)
- A Dangerous Game (2016)

==== Weet trilogy ====
- Weet (1995)
- Weet's Quest (1997)
- Weet Alone (1999)

=== Non-fiction ===
- Norman Bethune: A Life of Passionate Conviction (1999)
- Righting Wrongs: The Story of Norman Bethune (2001)
- Discovering the Arctic: The Story of John Rae (2003)
- Desperate Glory: The Story of WWI (2008)
- Bitter Ashes: The Story of WWII (2009)
- Ghost Mountains and Vanished Oceans: North America from Birth to Middle Age (2009)
- Failed Hope: The Story of the Lost Peace (2012)
- The Final Alchemy: A Novel of Murder, Magic and the Search for the Northwest Passage (2012)
- John Franklin: Traveller on Undiscovered Seas
- Lands of Lost Content (2020)
- A Man Exact and Truthful: John Rae and the Northwest Passage (2022)
- The Journal of James Fitzjames (2022)

=== Poetry ===
- Love, Death and Nonsense: A Diversity of Verse (2022)
