= Blood Red Ochre =

1991 novel by Kevin Major

- Cover of the 1989 Delacorte Press edition
- Author: Kevin Major
- Language: English
- Publication date: 1989

Blood Red Ochre is a 1989 novel by Canadian writer Kevin Major. It was a finalist for the 1990 Geoffrey Bilson Award.
