= Ms. Teeny-Wonderful (book series) =

Canadian fiction series by Martyn Godfrey

- Here She Is, Ms. Teeny Wonderful! (1984); It Isn't Easy Being Ms. Teeny Wonderful (1987); Send in Ms Teeny-Wonderful (1988)
- Author: Martyn Godfrey
- Country: Canada
- Language: English
- Genre: young adult coming of age
- Publisher: Scholastic
- Published: 1984 - 1988
- Media type: Print (paperback)
- No. of books: 3

Ms. Teeny-Wonderful (also marketed as the "Carol & Wally" series) is a trilogy of Canadian books written by Martyn Godfrey, depicting the life of tomboy Carol Weatherspoon and her best friend, Wally. The book series was praised for breaking gender conventions, and received mostly positive critical reception. The original Ms. Teeny-Wonderful book series was released in paperback by imprint Scholastic, and was mostly popular within Canada; the series has since fallen out of print with no reinstated editions as of 2022.

== Plot ==
The Ms. Teeny-Wonderful series follows Carol Weatherspoon, an Alberta teenager in the 1980s, as well as her best friend Wally Stutzgummer (a Slavic-Canadian boy) and Carol's ever-critical mother, who does not understand Carol's unconventional behaviour. Carol is a huge fan of BMX biking, and often practices stunts with her own bike at home. In the first book, which is also the best-known book in the series, Carol's mother enters her in a child beauty pageant for girls called the "Ms. Teeny-Wonderful" pageant. Much to her mother's horror, Carol's talent presented for the pageant is to jump her bike over six garbage cans lined up on the street. With Wally's help, Carol practices the stunt, often with comedic outcomes until she gets it right. Throughout the series, Carol's adventures become more outlandish, involving things such as foiling a kidnapping plot, dealing with a marriage proposal from a Middle Eastern prince, and coping with bothersome behaviour from younger children.

== Series list ==
- Here She Is, Ms. Teeny Wonderful! (1984) ISBN 0-59071482-1
- It Isn't Easy Being Ms. Teeny Wonderful (1987) ISBN 0590716743
- Send in Ms Teeny-Wonderful (1988) ISBN 0-590-71954-8

== Reception ==
The Ms. Teeny-Wonderful books have received praise from a number of critics. Barbara Conquest, a professional book critic and schoolteacher from Edmonton, Alberta, said of the books, "Carol and her friend Wally of St. Albert, Alberta, are the freshest, funniest, and most genuine young fictional characters since Bruno and Boots of MacDonald Hall. The author's sure touch with current adolescent idiom and his humorous, likeable characters should make this book a sure winner with both boys and girls in the upper elementary grades. Many junior high students will enjoy it too." Fellow critic Patricia Fry was more neutral, stating, "this reviewer would have felt more comfortable if the author had found a vehicle for Carol other than the in-fighting world of the beauty contest, but this book has enough strengths to warrant a place on your modern-series shelf." Author Michael Bradford listed Martyn Godfrey and his Ms. Teeny-Wonderful books as a personal inspiration for him, saying, "I have two early memories of being influenced to write when I was young. I remember getting to attend a writers workshop for young people when I was in maybe grade 5, led by the late, great Canadian writer, Martyn Godfrey. I was obsessed with his Ms. Teeny Wonderful series." The book was listed in the social media group Dark Canada Fiction for its bizarre sense of humour, including Carol saying the quote, "when this is over, I'm going to come to Ottawa and bite off your ears."

Freeride Indian-Canadian mountain bike coach and engineer Anita Naidu listed the series as an inspiration for her own personal love of BMX riding as a female; interviewer Leslie Hittmeier noted, "sitting in the backseat of the car while her parents drove her home from dance practice in Montreal, Naidu gazed out the window and saw a group of skateboarders riding around on speed bumps in a parking lot. She thought the sport looked rebellious and she wanted to do it. [Naidu] stumbled upon a book in the library: Here She Is, Ms. Teeny-Wonderful! by Martyn Godfrey, which follows a young girl who wins a beauty pageant by jumping over garbage cans on her BMX bike. The book and the skateboarders inspired Naidu to get a bike of her own. It was used and had no brakes, but she took it to the top of a hill and rode down as fast as she could."

== Status ==
All 3 of the Ms. Teeny-Wonderful books are, as of 2022, out of print. Scholastic continues to hold the publication rights to the series.
