= Dear Bruce Springsteen =

1987 book by Kevin Major

- First edition cover
- Author: Kevin Major
- Publisher: Delacorte Press
- Publication date: January 1, 1988
- ISBN: 978-0-385-29584-0

Dear Bruce Springsteen is a juvenile fiction novel published in 1987 by Canadian author Kevin Major. It consists of the letters of 14-year-old Terry Blanchard to his idol, Bruce Springsteen, in which he talks about his problems as a youth.
