= Karen Bass (writer) =

Canadian young adult fiction writer (born 1962)

- Born: 1962 (age 63–64); High Prairie, Alberta, Canada
- Education: University of Victoria
- Writing career
- Notable awards: Canadian Library Association Young Adult Book Award (2014); Geoffrey Bilson Award (2014, 2016)
- Website: karenbass.ca

Karen Bass (born 1962) is a Canadian writer of young adult fiction. Her 2014 novel Graffiti Knight won the Canadian Library Association Young Adult Book Award and Geoffrey Bilson Award. Her 2015 novel Uncertain Soldier also won the Geoffrey Bilson Award.

== Biography ==
Bass was born in 1962 in High Prairie, Alberta, and grew up on a farm. After attending the University of Alberta, she received a degree in psychology from the University of Victoria. In 2012, she was the writer-in-residence for the Peace region in Alberta.

Later, Bass managed a library in northwest Alberta for sixteen years before committing to writing full-time. In 2017, Bass moved to Hamilton, Ontario with her husband. Although she focuses on writing full-time, she also volunteers at the Hamilton Public Library. She is a member of the Canadian Society of Children's Authors Illustrators & Performers, Writers' Union of Canada, and Writers Guild of Alberta.

== Awards and honours ==
Three of Bass's novels are Junior Library Guild books: The Hill (2016), Two Times a Traitor (2017), and Blood Donor (2021).

In 2015, Bank Street College of Education included Graffiti Knight on their list of the best books for children ages fourteen and up. In 2017, the novel was included on CBC Books' "100 young adult books that make you proud to be Canadian" list in the thirtieth position.

Awards for Bass's writing
Year	Title	Award	Result	Ref.
2008	Run Like Jäger	INDIES Award for Young Adult Fiction (Children's)	Honorable mention	
2009	Summer of Fire	INDIES Award for Young Adult Fiction (Children's)	Finalist	
2011	Drummer Girl	INDIES Award for Young Adult Fiction (Children's)	Bronze	
2012	Drummer Girl	Moonbeam Children's Book Award for YA General	Bronze	
2014	Grafitti Knight	Canadian Library Association Young Adult Book Award	Winner	
2014	Grafitti Knight	Geoffrey Bilson Award	Winner	
2014	Grafitti Knight	R. Ross Annett Award for Children's Literature	Winner	
2014	Grafitti Knight	Stellar Book Award	Nominee	
2016	Uncertain Soldier	Forest of Reading Red Maple Award	Finalist	
2016	Uncertain Soldier	Geoffrey Bilson Award	Winner	
2016	Uncertain Soldier	IODE Violet Downey Book Award	Shortlist	
2016	Grafitti Knight	Pacific Northwest Library Association Young Reader's Choice Award	Nominee	
2017	The Hill	Forest of Reading Red Maple Award	Finalist	
2017	The Hill	Snow Willow Award	Winner	
2017	The Hill	Sunburst Award for Young Adult Fiction	Longlist	
2018	The Hill	Rocky Mountain Book Award	Nominee	
2022	Blood Donor	Crime Writers of Canada Awards of Excellence for Best Juvenile or YA Crime Book	Shortlist	

== Publications ==
- Run Like Jäger (2008)
- Summer of Fire (2009)
- Drummer Girl (2011)
- Graffiti Knight (2013)
- Uncertain Soldier (2015)
- The Hill (2016)
- Two Times a Traitor (2017)
- Blood Donor (2021)
