= Greener Grass: The Famine Years =

Book by Caroline Pignat

- Author: Caroline Pignat
- Language: English
- Publisher: Red Deer Press
- Publication date: 2009
- Publication place: Canada
- Media type: Print (Trade Paperback)
- Pages: 278 pp (first edition)
- ISBN: 978-0-88995-402-1

Greener Grass, published in 2009, is the second novel of Canadian author Caroline Pignat. The story revolves around a 14-year-old girl, Kit Byrne, living during the Great Famine of 1847 in Ireland. The Byrne family faces imminent eviction when their landlord, Lord Fraser, wants to repossess their land. He attempts to drive them out by raising the rent and having his estate manager, Lynch, set fires in the surrounding area. Kit works as a kitchen maid in the main house, but when she loses her job her mother is forced to sell precious family heirlooms and furniture. With her father dead, she must fight for survival and help her ailing mother and siblings escape Ireland for good.

This story is a glimpse into the tragic events of the Great Hunger, the famine that devastated Ireland, forcing thousands of impoverished families to seek better livelihoods outside of their homeland.

== Awards and nominations ==
Award	Year	Result
Governor General's Award for English-language children's literature	2009	Won
CLA Children's Book of the Year Award	2009	Shortlist
Geoffrey Bilson Award for Historical Fiction	2009	Finalist
Manitoba Young Readers' Choice Awards	2010	Shortlist
Red Maple Award	2010	Nominated
