= Charlie Wilcox =

Children's novel by Sharon E. McKay

- Author: Sharon E. McKay
- Publisher: Stoddart Kids
- Publication date: October 19, 2000
- Award: Geoffrey Bilson Award (2001); Violet Downey Award (2001)
- ISBN: 9780773760936
- Followed by: Charlie Wilcox's Great War

Charlie Wilcox is a children's novel by Sharon E. McKay about a boy from Newfoundland in World War I. First published in 2000, the novel won the Geoffrey Bilson Award and the Violet Downey Award. It is followed by a sequel, Charlie Wilcox's Great War, published in 2003.

== Plot ==
The book opens in Newfoundland in 1915. Charlie Wilcox's parents want him to go to college rather than become a seal hunter like his father; they believe that his club foot makes him unfit for an active life. To prove his courage and ability, fourteen-year-old Charlie decides to stow away on a sealing vessel; however, he finds himself instead on a troop ship bound for the war in Europe. Rather than return, he chooses to become a stretcher bearer at the front where he witnesses the horrors of trench warfare and the Battle of the Somme.

== Awards ==
Awards for Charlie Wilcox
Year	Award	Result	Ref.
2001	Geoffrey Bilson Award	Winner	
2001	Violet Downey Award	Winner	
2002	Manitoba Young Readers' Choice Award	Nominee	
2001-02	Hackmatack Children's Choice Award for English Fiction	Winner	
