= Marianne Brandis =

Dutch-born Canadian writer

- Born: October 5, 1938 (age 87); Amersfoort, Netherlands
- Education: McMaster University (BA, 1960; MA, 1964)
- Writing career
- Genres: Fiction; Life writing; Creative nonfiction
- Website: mariannebrandis.ca

Marianne Brandis (born 1938) is a Dutch-born Canadian writer.

Brandis was born in Amersfoort on October 5, 1938, to Willem Jean and Mattha Cornelia (née van Vollenhoven) Brender à Brandis. She moved with her family to Canada in 1947, living in British Columbia and Nova Scotia before settling in Ontario. She attended the University of British Columbia from 1956 to 1958, then St. Francis Xavier University from 1958 to 1959 before earning a Bachelor of Arts from McMaster University in 1960, followed by a Master of Arts from the same university in 1964.

Brandis worked as a copywriter for various private radio stations and for the Canadian Broadcasting Corporation. She also taught English at Ryerson Polytechnical Institute (now Toronto Metropolitan University) from 1967 to 1989, after which she devoted herself to writing full time.

As of 2016, she lived in Stratford, Ontario.

== Awards and honours ==
Fire Ship (1992) received a Commendation from the Toronto Historical Board, and Rebellion: A Novel of Upper Canada (1996) received the Award of Merit from Heritage Toronto.

Awards for Brandis's work
Year	Work	Award	Result	Ref.
1986	The Quarter-Pie Window	Canadian Library Association Young Adult Book Award	Winner	
1986	The Quarter-Pie Window	IODE Violet Downey Book Award	Winner	
1991	The Sign of the Scales	Geoffrey Bilson Award	Winner	
1996	Rebellion: A Novel of Upper Canada	Geoffrey Bilson Award	Winner	

== Selected works ==
- This Spring's Sowing (1970)
- The Tinderbox (1982)
- The Quarter-Pie Window (1985)
- The Sign of the Scales (1990)
- Fire Ship (1992)
- Rebellion: A Novel of Upper Canada (1996)
- Frontiers and Sanctuaries: A Woman's Life in Holland and Canada, biography (2006)
- The Grand River / Dundalk to Lake Erie (2015)
