= Four Steps to Death =

2005 historical novel by John Wilson

Men
- The cover of Four Steps to Death
- Author: John Wilson
- Illustrator: Céleste Gagnon
- Language: English
- Subject: The Battle of Stalingrad
- Genre: Historical fiction
- Publisher: Kids Can Press
- Publication date: 2005
- Publication place: Canada
- Pages: 207 pp
- ISBN: 1-55337-704-4 (bound); 1-55337-705-2 (pbk.)
- OCLC: 57208827

Four Steps to Death is a 2005 historical novel by John Wilson. It is about the horrors and tragedies of the Battle of Stalingrad. The plot revolves around the lives of various characters involved in the battle on both sides of the conflict and shows how horrible war can be.

The title is derived from a line of the Soviet song "Zemlyanka": "And here there are four steps to death."

== Plot summary ==
In this novel by John Wilson set during the Battle of Stalingrad, three participants — two soldiers and a boy — are caught in its horrors. Their story is told over seven days of fierce and deadly street-by-street fighting. Vasily is a patriotic Russian soldier determined to rid his country of the hated Nazi invaders — if he can stay alive long enough. Conrad is a German tank officer, part of the seemingly unstoppable force sweeping eastward over the steppe, expecting a quick victory over Stalin's ill-trained and badly equipped Red Army.

Between them is eight-year-old Sergei, whose home is the maze of rubble that used to be the city of Stalingrad. None of them can know that their fates will be intertwined as the cataclysm engulfs them.

In the middle of the conflict is eight-year-old Sergei who lives in the cellar of his former apartment, scavenging among the ruins of his hometown while the Germans and Russians wage war on one another. Thousands of bodies litter the streets, and yet, Sergei is not bothered by any of this, being hardened by the horrors that he faces every day. He dreams of being a famous sniper one day and ridding his homeland of the "Fascists".

== Characters ==
Sergei Illyich Andropov: Sergei is an eight-year-old boy living in the city of Stalingrad. He faces the horrors of The Battle of Stalingrad every day and is physically and mentally hardened by the sights and challenges he faces.

Vasily Sarayev: Vasily is a seventeen-year-old Soviet soldier fighting to defend Stalingrad, following the orders of Joseph Stalin, their leader.

Conrad Zeitsler: Conrad is an eighteen-year-old German tank officer serving under Adolf Hitler. He is the younger brother to Josef Zeitsler.

Josef Zeitsler: Josef is the twenty-two-year-old, older brother to Conrad Zeitsler. While barely present in the novel he has a sense of maturity and joviality about him.

== Nominations and reception ==
Four Steps to Death was nominated for the 2006 Sheila A. Egoff Children’s Literature Prize, the 2006 Geoffrey Bilson Award, the 2007 White Pine Award. The novel was recognized as a Society of School Librarians International Honor Book (2006), and as a Manitoba Reader's Young Choice Award Honour Book. It was shortlisted for the Stellar Award, the Isinglass Award (2008), and was starred in the CCBC Our Choice 2006.
