= Zemlyanka (song) =

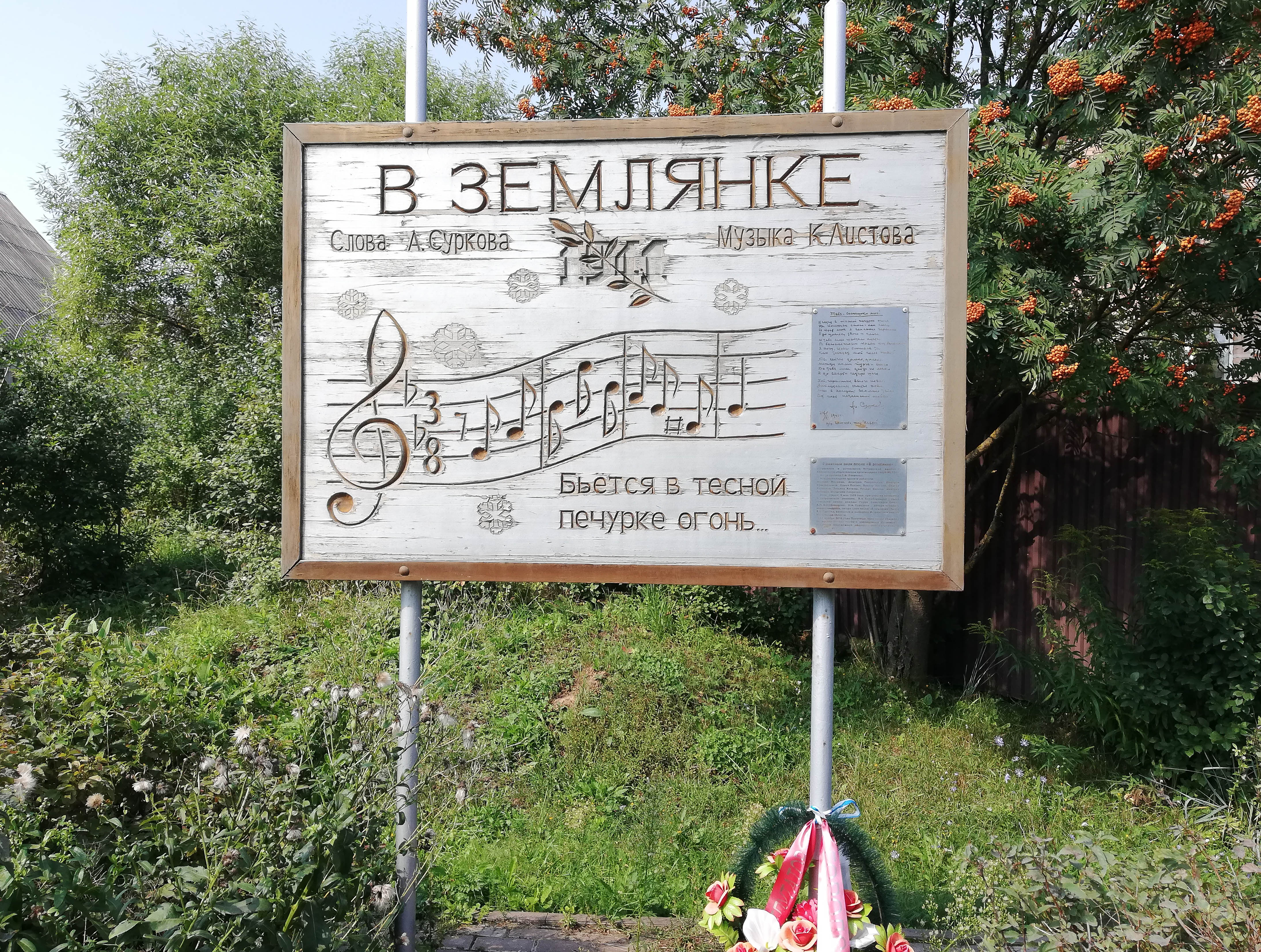

Song
- Written: 1942
- Composer: Konstantin Listov
- Lyricist: Alexey Surkov

"Zemlyanka" was the name for a German-Soviet War song written by Alexey Surkov (verses) and Konstantin Listov (music) in 1941 during the Battle of Moscow. The use of zemlyankas by soldiers is mentioned in the song.

== Story ==
In November 1941, Alexey Surkov (who became a war correspondent of the Krasnoarmeyskaya Pravda newspaper at the very beginning of the Great Patriotic War) came under fire from German infantry near the Kashino village along with 258th Rifle Regiment. Having broken through the offensive and crossed the river on thin ice under mortar fire, Surkov found that his overcoat was all cut by shrapnel. After arriving in Ulyashino village, everyone was placed in a zemlyanka. The Chief of Staff fell asleep right at the table, as he had not slept for four days; the others settled down near the stove, someone started playing the accordion. Surkov began to make sketches for the report, but the poem turned out. In February 1942, Konstantin Listov composed the melody to the poem. On March 25, 1942, the song was published in Komsomolskaya Pravda.

== English Lyrics ==
The fire is flickering in the narrow stove
Resin oozes from the log like a tear
And the concertina in the bunker
Sings to me of your smile and eyes.

The bushes whispered to me about you
In a snow-white field near Moscow
I want you above all to hear
How sad my living voice is.

You are now very far away
Expanses of snow lie between us
It is so hard for me to come to you
And here there are four steps to death.

Sing concertina, in defiance of the snowstorm.
Call out to that happiness which has lost its way.
I'm warm in the cold bunker,
Because of your inextinguishable love.
(Stalingrad by Antony Beevor (c)1998.

== Russian Lyrics ==
Бьётся в тесной печурке огонь,
На поленьях смола, как слеза.
И поёт мне в землянке гармонь
Про улыбку твою и глаза.

Про тебя мне шептали кусты
В белоснежных полях под Москвой.
Я хочу, чтобы слышала ты,
Как тоскует мой голос живой.

Ты сейчас далеко, далеко,
Между нами снега и снега.
До тебя мне дойти не легко,
А до смерти — четыре шага.

Пой, гармоника, вьюге назло,
Заплутавшее счастье зови.
Мне в холодной землянке тепло
От моей негасимой любви.

== Popular culture ==
The entire poem was mentioned in the 2005 Canadian historical novel, Four Steps to Death, by John Wilson, in which Red Army soldiers sing it on the way from Moscow to Stalingrad (present-day Volgograd). The title of the novel is derived from a line of the poem, "And here there are four steps to death."

The song is part of the repertoire of the Alexandrov Ensemble.

A performance by Leonid Utesov was featured diagetically in the episode "I'll Believe in Anything" of the Canadian television show Heated Rivalry, when Ilya Rozanov is in Russia.

== Well-known performers ==
- Yaroslav Alexandrovich Evdokimov
- Mikhail Novokhizhin
- Vladimir Troshin

== Additional information ==
A response song exists — "The answer to the song "Zemlyanka"" — on behalf of the woman the fighter is addressing; as well as a song-dialogue between this fighter and this woman.

== See also ==
- Four Steps to Death
