= Martyn Godfrey =

English-Canadian author (1949–2000)

- Born: April 17, 1949; Birmingham, England
- Died: March 10, 2000 (aged 50)
- Education: University of Alberta (1974)
- Occupation: Author
- Writing career
- Genres: Children's fantasy and science fiction

Martyn Godfrey (April 17, 1949 — March 10, 2000) was an English-Canadian author of children's fantasy and science fiction books. Born in Birmingham, England, he moved to Toronto, Ontario when he was eight. Godfrey graduated from University of Alberta in 1974 with a teacher education degree.

Godfrey began writing children's stories in the 1980s. In 1989, he was the Edmonton Public Library's writer-in-residence, and that same year won the Geoffrey Bilson Award for his book, Mystery in the Frozen Lands. He became one of Canada's most popular and prolific children's writers. He went on to sell millions of books, both in Canada and throughout the rest of the world.

In 2000, he died of complications due to liver disease. After his death, the Young Alberta Book Society began presenting an annual Martyn Godfrey Young Writers Award in his name.

== Novels ==
- The Vandarian Incident (1981)
- The Day the Sky Exploded (1981)
- Alien Wargames (1984)
- Spin Out (1984)
- The Beast (1984)
- Fire! Fire! (1985)
- Ice Hawk (1985)
- The Last War (1986)
- Plan B Is Total Panic (1986)
- Do You Want Fries With That? (1986)
- Rebel Yell (1987)
- It Seemed Like A Good Idea at the Time (1987)
- More Than Weird (1987)
- Wild Night (1987)
- Baseball Crazy (1987)
- Mystery in the Frozen Lands (1988)
- Why Just Me? (1989)
- Can You Teach Me To Pick My Nose (1990)
- Just Call Me Boom Boom (1994)
- Meet You in the Sewer ( )
- There's a Cow in My Swimming Pool ( )
- The Great Science Fair Disaster ( )
- The Jaws Mob series ( )
- Ms. Teeny-Wonderful Series:
1. Here She Is, Ms. Teeny Wonderful! (1984)
2. It Isn't Easy Being Ms. Teeny Wonderful (1987)
3. Send in Ms Teeny-Wonderful (1988)
- I Spent My Summer Vacation in Space (1990)
1. Wally Stutzgummer, Super Bad Dude (1992)
- Please Remove Your Elbow From My Ear (1993)
- Mall-Rats (1995)
- The Things (1995)
- Don't Worry About Me, I'm Just Crazy (1995)
