= Marsha Skrypuch =

Ukrainian Canadian children's writer (born 1954)

Marsha Forchuk Skrypuch
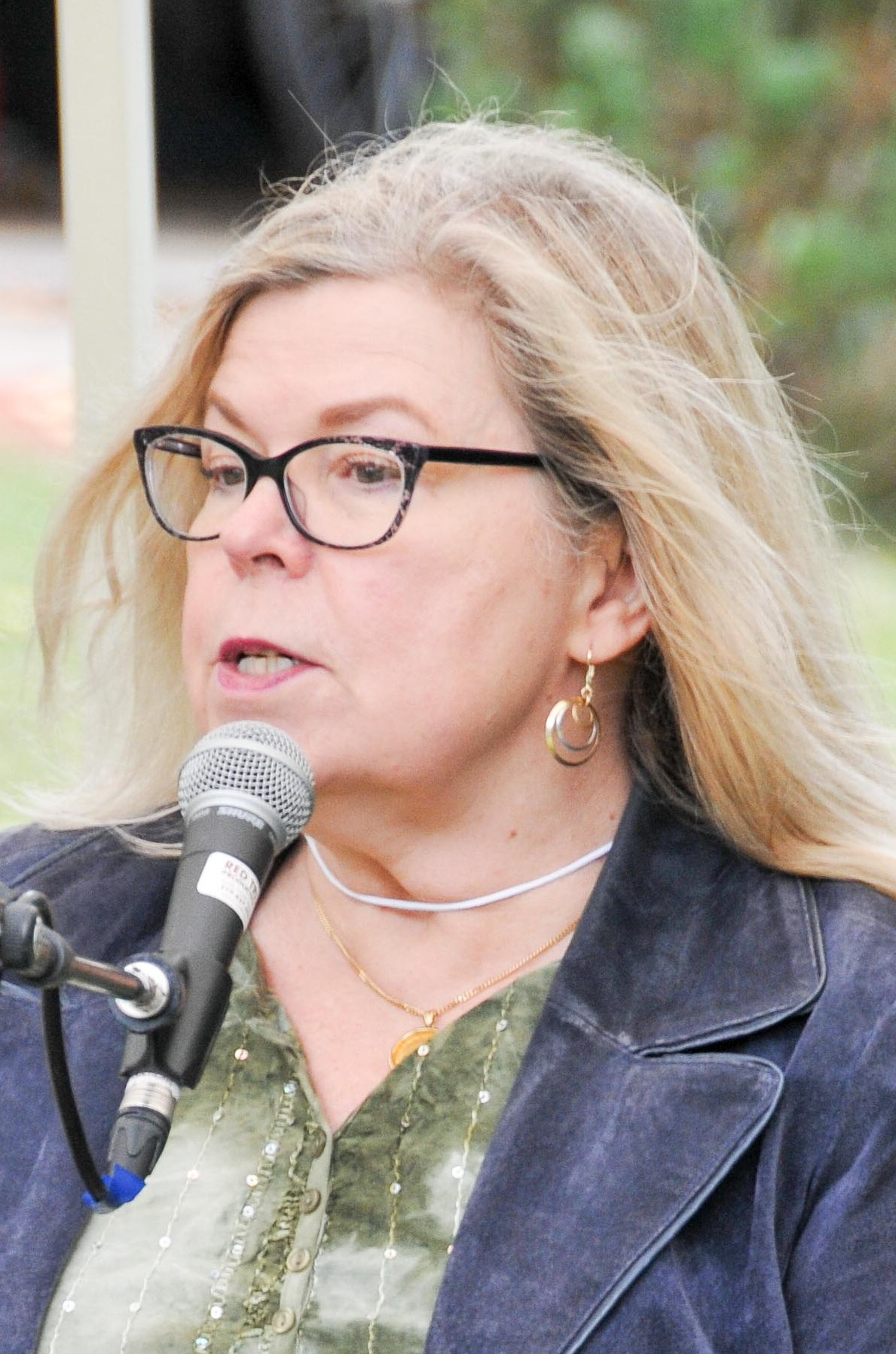
- Skrypuch reading at the Eden Mills Writers' Festival in 2018
- Born: Marsha Forchuk; December 12, 1954 (age 71); Brantford, ON, Canada
- Education: University of Western Ontario
- Occupation: Author
- Writing career
- Genre: Children's Literature

Marsha Forchuk Skrypuch (/ˈskrɪpɪk/ SCRIP-ik; born 1954) is a Ukrainian-Canadian children's writer who currently lives in Brantford, Ontario.

She received a B.A. in English and a Master of Library Science from the University of Western Ontario, and began writing fiction in 1992. Her first book, Silver Threads, was published in 1996.

Marsha Skrypuch is the author of many books for children and young adults. She primarily writes about war from a young person's perspective. She is also the author of the Making Bombs for Hitler trilogy which consists of Making Bombs for Hitler, The War Below, and Stolen Girl.

== Works ==
- Silver Threads – 1996
- The Best Gifts – 1998
- The Hunger – 1999
- Enough – 2000
- Hope's War – 2001
- Nobody's Child – 2003
- Aram's Choice – 2006
- Kobzar's Children: A Century of Untold Ukrainian Stories – 2006
- Dear Canada: Prisoners in the Promised Land: The Ukrainian Internment Diary of Anya Soloniuk, Spirit Lake, Quebec, 1914 – 2007
- Daughter of War – 2008
- Call Me Aram – 2009
- A Christmas To Remember – 2009 -- "An Unexpected Visitor" was written by Skrypuch for this anthology.
- Stolen Girl (originally Stolen Child) – 2010
- Last Airlift: A Vietnamese Orphan's Rescue from War – 2011
- Making Bombs For Hitler – 2012
- One Step At A Time: A Vietnamese Child Finds Her Way – 2012
- When Mama Goes to Work – 2013
- Underground Soldier – 2014
- Dance of the Banished – 2014
- Adrift at Sea: A Vietnamese Boy's Story of Survival – 2016
- Don't Tell the Nazis (originally Don't Tell the Enemy) – 2018
- The War Below (originally Underground Soldier) - 2018
- Trapped in Hitler's Web - 2020
- Sky of Bombs, Sky of Stars; A Vietnamese War Orphan Finds Home - 2020 (omnibus edition of Last Airlift and One Step at a Time)
- Traitors Among Us - 2021
- Winterkill - 2022
- Under Attack (Kidnapped From Ukraine #1) - 2025
- Standoff (Kidnapped From Ukraine #2) - 2025

== Awards ==
- 1996, Taras Shevchenko for Silver Threads
- 2000, CCBC's Our Choice Award for The Hunger
- 2001, CCBC's Our Choice Award for Enough
- 2002, CCBC's Our Choice Award for Hope's War
- 2004 CCBC's Our Choice Award for Nobody's Child
- 2006 CCBC's Our Choice for Aram's Choice
- 2008 Order of Princess Olga, for her writing on the Holodomor, in particular her book Enough
- 2010 Woman of Distinction, World Congress of Ukrainian Women's Organizations
- 2010 Calliope Award for outstanding writing and mentoring, Humber School for Writers
- 2011 SCBWI Crystal Kite Award for the Americas, for Stolen Child
- 2012 CCBC Best Books for Kids: Last Airlift
- 2012 CCBC Best Books For Kids: Stolen Child
- 2012 CCBC Best Books For Kids, Starred Review: Making Bombs For Hitler
- 2012 CCBC Best Books for Kids: Making Bombs For Hitler
- 2013 Red Cedar Book Award Winner in category "Information", Last Airlift
- 2013 Silver Birch Fiction Winner: Making Bombs For Hitler
- 2014 Manitoba Young Readers' Choice Award: Making Bombs For Hitler
- 2014 Silver Birch non-fiction Winner: One Step At A Time: A Vietnamese Child Finds Her Way
- 2014 Underground Soldier: Starred Selection, CCBC Best Books for Kids
- 2015 Underground Soldier: Geoffrey Bilson Award nominee
- 2015 Dance of the Banished: Geoffrey Bilson Award WINNER
- 2015 Dance of the Banished: Junior Library Guild selection April
- 2015 Dance of the Banished: CCBC Best Books for Kids
- 2015 Dance of the Banished: The White Ravens selection 2015
- 2016 Dance of the Banished: USBBY Outstanding International Book
- 2016 Underground Soldier: Kobzar Literary Award nominee
- 2016 Adrift At Sea: Resource Links Best Book
- 2017 Adrift At Sea: Starred selection: ABC CLIO
- 2017 Adrift At Sea: Starred selection: CCBC Best Books for Kids
- 2017 The Best Gifts: Storytelling World Resource Honor Book
- 2017 Adrift At Sea: 2017 Canadian Children’s Literature Roundtables Information Book Award, Honour Book
- 2017 Adrift At Sea: Cybils Finalist for MG non-fiction.
- 2017 Making Bombs for Hitler, A Mighty Girl Book of the Year
- 2018 Adrift At Sea: Golden Oak Award shortlist,
- 2018 Adrift At Sea: Louisiana Young Readers’ Choice nominee,
- 2018 Adrift At Sea: Selected for Pope Francis exhibit, Bologna Italy,
- 2018 Making Bombs for Hitler, US edition: Starred selection: ABC CLIO
- 2018 Making Bombs for Hitler, US edition: Winner, Battle of the Books, Chesapeake PL.
- 2018 Making Bombs for Hitler, US edition: YALSA Quick Pick
- 2018 Making Bombs for Hitler, US edition: Winner: Iowa Teen Award, 2018-2019, Grades 6-9
- 2018 Don’t Tell the Enemy, Starred review, CCBC Best Books for Kids
- 2018 Don’t Tell the Enemy, Kids’ Forest Committee Summer Reading Selection
- 2018 Don’t Tell the Enemy, CBC The Next Chapter Book Panel Selection
- 2018 The War Below, North Carolina Young Adult book Award shortlist for 2018-2019
- 2018 The War Below, CYBILS middle-grade fiction nomination,
- 2018 Too Young to Escape, CBC Best Book for Kids, 2018.
- 2018 Too Young to Escape, Starred Review, Quill & Quire, Nov
- 2018 Too Young to Escape, CBC 13 middle grade books to watch for this fall.
- 2018 Too Young to Escape, Junior Library Guild Selection
- 2018 Too Young to Escape, CBC 12 books to read to commemorate Remembrance Day, 2018.
- 2019 Don’t Tell the Enemy, Bilson Award nominee
- 2019 Don’t Tell the Nazis, A Mighty Girl Book of the Year
- 2019 Too Young to Escape, Forest of Reading Kids’ Silver Birch selection 2019
- 2019 Too Young to Escape, CCBC Best Books for Kids.
- 2019 Too Young to Escape, Information Book Award nominee, Children’s Literature Roundtables of Canada
- 2019 Too Young to Escape, 2019 USSBY Outstanding International Book
- 2019 Career Excellence Award, Brantford Writers’ Circle
- 2020 Don’t Tell the Enemy, WINNER: Saskatchewan Snow Willow Award
- 2020 Don’t Tell the Enemy, Saskatchewan Snow Willow Award nominee
- 2020 Don’t Tell the Enemy, MYRCA Northern Lights nominee
- 2020 Don’t Tell the Enemy, Red Maple Fiction shortlist
- 2020 Too Young to Escape, Saskatchewan Diamond Willow Award nomination
- 2020 Too Young to Escape, WINNER Ontario Yellow Cedar Award
- 2020 Too Young to Escape, Ontario Yellow Cedar Award nomination
- 2020 Too Young to Escape, WINNER BC Red Cedar information Book Award
- 2020 Too Young to Escape, BC Red Cedar Book Awards nomination, non-fiction
- 2020 Too Young to Escape, 2019-2020 Hackmatack Award nominee.
- 2020 Too Young to Escape, ILA Notable Book for a Global Society
- 2020 Too Young to Escape, Honorable Mention, Freeman Award
- 2020 Trapped in Hitler’s Web, A Mighty Girl 2020 Book of the Year
- 2020 Sky of Bombs, Sky of Stars, CCBC Best Book, 2020
- 2021 Traitors Among Us, Kirkus, starred review
- 2021 Traitors Among Us, Best Books of the Month, middle-grade, Sept 2021, Amazon.com
- 2021 Traitors Among Us, Kirkus Best YA book list, 2021
- 2021 Traitors Among Us, A Mighty Girl 2021 Book of the Year
- 2021 Sky of Bombs, Sky of Stars, Poughkeepsie Public Library 2021 Big Read selection
- 2022 Traitors Among Us, Geoffrey Bilson Award, shortlist, 2022.
- 2022 Trapped in Hitler’s Web, MYRCA Northern Lights nomination
- 2022: author banned for life from entering Russian Federation
- 2022 Winterkill: Junior Library Guild Gold Standard Selection
- 2023 Winterkill: #VelshiBannedBookClub selection
- 2023 Winterkill: New York Times reviewed
- 2023 Winterkill: Forest of Reading Kid Committee Red Maple summer reading list 2023
- 2023 Winterkill: CCBC Best Book for Kids, 2023
- 2024 Winterkill: Kobzar Book Award shortlist, 2024
- 2024 Winterkill: MYRCA Northern Lights nomination, 2024
- 2025 Kidnapped from Ukraine – Under Attack: Starred review Kirkus
- 2025 Kidnapped from Ukraine – Under Attack: Starred review Booklist
- 2025 Kidnapped from Ukraine – Under Attack: Loan Stars Junior Canadian Top Pick, Booknet Canada
- 2025 Kidnapped from Ukraine — Standoff: Starred review School Library Journal
