= Second Story Press =

Canadian publishing company

- Founded: 1988
- Founder: Margie Wolfe
- Country of origin: Canada
- Headquarters location: Toronto, Ontario
- Distribution: University of Toronto Press (Canada, US adult); Orca Books (US children's); Gazelle Book Services (UK)
- Publication types: Books
- Official website: secondstorypress.ca

Second Story Press is a book publishing company located in Toronto, Ontario, Canada. The company is focused on feminism, focusing on books featuring strong female characters and exploring themes of social justice, human rights, and ability issues.

Margie Wolfe, who co-founded the company with three other women in 1988, is publisher, owner, and president. Authors published by Second Story Press include Rachna Gilmore, Kathy Kacer, Joanne Robertson, Hana Brady, and Kathy Stinson. Second Story publishes both the Women's Hall of Fame series and the Holocaust Remembrance series of books for children.

Second Story Press is a member of the Association of Canadian Publishers, the Organization of Book Publishers of Ontario, and the Canadian Children's Book Centre. It also receives funding from the Canada Council for the Arts and the Ontario Arts Council.

Recognition Second Story Press books have won international awards, and several titles have been adapted for film and stage. Its books have been awarded by organisations including the United Nations and Yad Vashem. Hana’s Suitcase won the Ultimate Silver Birch Award, selected by Canadian readers to be the best of the Ontario Library Association’s Silver Birch winners from the last twenty years.
