= Judith Silverthorne =

Canadian writer (born 1953)

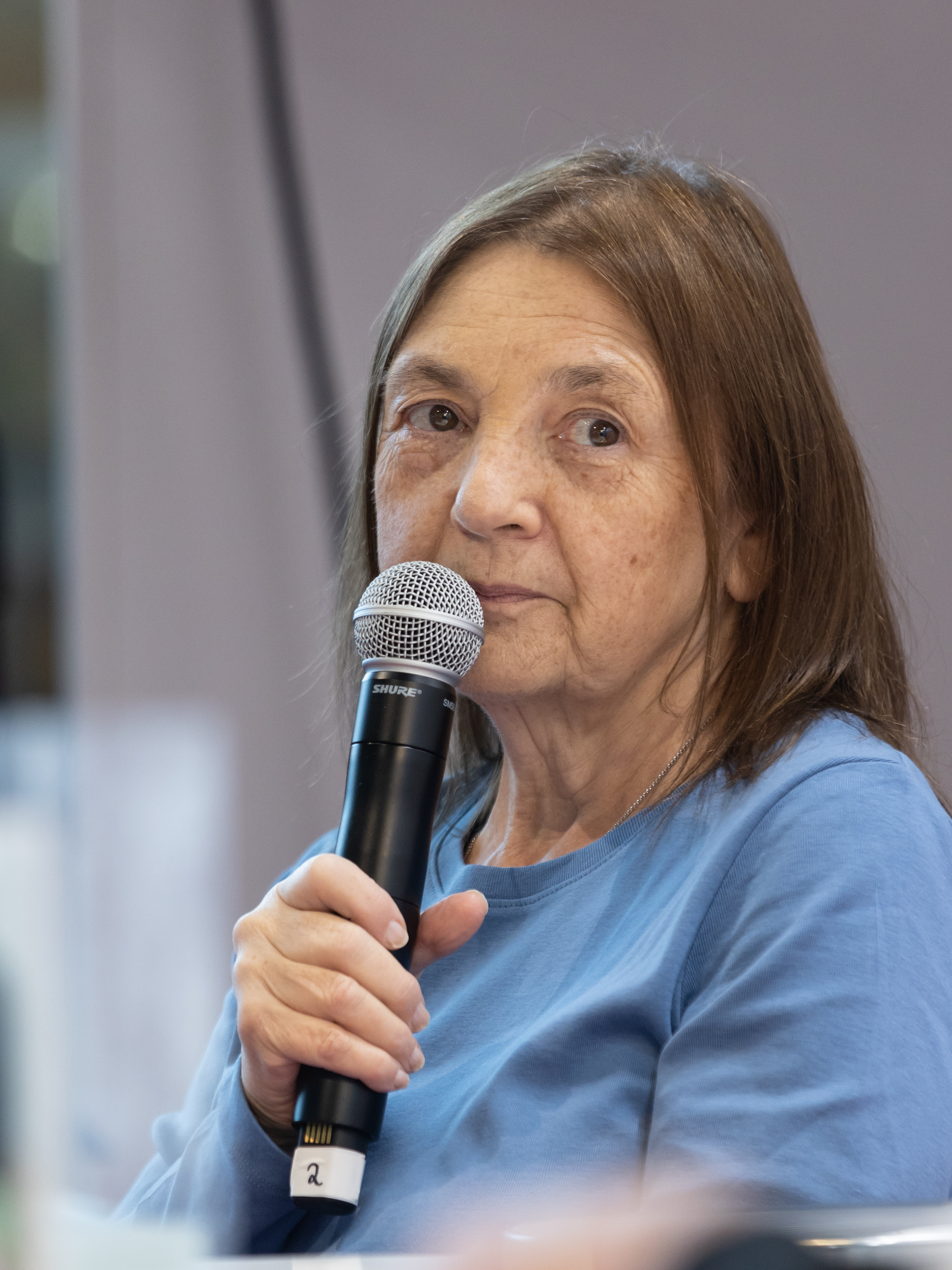
- Silverthorne in 2021
- Born: Judith Iles; March 11, 1953 (age 73); Regina, Saskatchewan, Canada
- Occupation: Author
- Writing career
- Genres: Children's literature; non-fiction

Judith Silverthorne, née Judith Iles (born 11 March 1953) is a Canadian author specializing in children's literature, as well as nonfiction about historical Saskatchewan woodworkers and furniture makers, and an immigrant potter, Peter Rupchan.

Born in Regina, Saskatchewan, Silverthorne has written hundreds of newspaper and magazine articles, and instructs creative writing classes. She is a former documentary producer and president of the Saskatchewan Writer's Guild.

In 2015, Silverthorne published a book named Honouring the Buffalo aimed at preserving aboriginal culture. Written in English the book is accompanied by Cree translations and is adapted from one of Piapot Cree First Nation elder Ray Lavallee's oral stories.

Silverthorne lives in Regina, Saskatchewan where she teaches at the University of Regina.

== Awards ==
Silverthorn has won three Saskatchewan Book Awards. In 1996, her book The Secret of Sentinel Rock won the Children's Literature Award and in 2003 she was awarded the same prize for Dinosaur Hideout. She also received the Publishing Award in 1995 for Waiting For The Light.

== Selected bibliography ==
- The Secret of the Stone Circle, Coteau Books, 2010, ISBN 978-1-55050-431-6 or ISBN 1-55050-431-2
- Dinosaur Blackout, Coteau Books, 2008, ISBN 978-1-55050-375-3 or ISBN 1-55050-375-8
- Dinosaur Stakeout, Coteau Books, 2006, ISBN 978-1-55050-344-9 or ISBN 1-55050-344-8
- The Secret of the Stone House, Coteau Books, 2005, ISBN 978-1-55050-325-8 or ISBN 1-55050-325-1
- Dinosaur Breakout, Coteau Books, 2004, ISBN 978-1-55050-294-7 or ISBN 1-55050-294-8
- Dinosaur Hideout, Coteau Books, 2003, ISBN 1-55050-226-3 or ISBN 978-1-55050-226-8
- The Secret of Sentinel Rock, Coteau Books, 1996, ISBN 978-1-55050-386-9 or ISBN 1-55050-386-3
- Made in Saskatchewan: Peter Rupchan, Ukrainian Pioneer and Potter, Prairie Lily Cooperative, 1991, Reprint: Spiral Communications Inc., 2004, ISBN 0-921435-04-5
- Ingrained Legacy: Saskatchewan Pioneer Woodworkers, 1870–1930, Spiral Communications Inc., 2004, ISBN 978-0-9732879-0-5
