= Sharon E. McKay =

Canadian author

- Born: 1954 (age 71–72); Montreal, Quebec, Canada

Sharon E. McKay (born 1954) is a Canadian author of novels and graphic novels for children and young adults, that often focus on children going through hardships throughout the world. She was born in 1954 in Montreal, Quebec, and earned a B.A. from York University in 1978. She lives in Prince Edward Island.

== Awards ==
McKay is the recipient of several literary awards. The novel Charlie Wilcox won the Geoffrey Bilson Award and the Violet Downey Award. The novel End of The Line won the 2015 Ann Connor Brimer Award and the Hackmatack award. The novel War Brothers won the Arthur Ellis Award for Best Juvenile or Young Adult Crime Book in 2010. The novel Prison Boy won the Ann Connor Brimer Award for Children's Literature.

== Bibliography ==
- Charlie Wilcox (2000)
- Charlie Wilcox's Great War (2002)
- Esther (2004)
- War Brothers (2009)
- Thunder Over Kandahar (2010)
- Enemy Territory (2012)
- War Brothers, The Graphic Novel (2014)
- The End of the Line (2015)
- Prison Boy (2015)

Our Canadian Girl: Penelope series

- Penelope: Terror in the Harbour (2002)
- Penelope: The Glass Castle (2002)
- Penelope: An Irish Penny (2003)
- Penelope: Christmas Reunion (2004)
