= Kevin Major =

Canadian author

- Born: September 12, 1949 (age 77); Stephenville, Newfoundland and Labrador, Canada
- Education: Memorial University
- Occupation: Author
- Writing career
- Language: English
- Notable works: No Man's Land, Eating Between the Lines
- Notable awards: Vicky Metcalf Award

Kevin Major (born September 12, 1949) is a Canadian author who lives in St. John's, Newfoundland and Labrador with his wife. He writes for both young people and adults, including fiction, literary non-fiction, poetry, and plays.

Major was born and raised in Stephenville, Newfoundland. He later moved to St. John's where he attended Memorial University of Newfoundland. Before becoming a writer, he taught school in several parts of the province, including the Eastport Peninsula in Bonavista Bay. His early novels are known for exploring issues such as adolescence and family. The novels were usually set on the island of Newfoundland. In 1992, he was awarded the Vicky Metcalf Award for his body of work. His more recent books are mostly adult fiction, including the Sebastian Synard murder mystery series.

== Bibliography ==
- 1978 – Hold Fast ISBN 0-88899-579-2, ISBN 0-88899-579-2 (nominated: Books in Canada First Novel Award; winner: Governor General's Award, Book-of-the-Year CACL, Ruth Schwartz Award; placed on Hans Christian Honour List)
- 1980 – Far From Shore ISBN 0-88899-568-7 (winner: Canadian Young Adult Book Award)
- 1984 – Thirty-Six Exposures ISBN 0-385-25464-4
- 1987 – Dear Bruce Springsteen ISBN 0-385-29584-7
- 1989 – Blood Red Ochre ISBN 0-7704-2717-0 (nominated: Book-of-the-Year CACL, Geoffrey Bilson Award)
- 1991 – Eating Between the Lines ISBN 0-7704-2705-7 (nominated: Ruth Schwartz Award; winner: Book-of-the-Year CACL, Ann Conner-Brimer Award)
- 1993 – Diana: My Autobiography ISBN 0-7704-2702-2
- 1995 – No Man's Land ISBN 1-894463-71-4 and 2005 – No Man's Land: A Play ISBN 1-894463-71-4
- 1997 – Gaffer: A Novel of Newfoundland ISBN 0-385-25667-1
- 1997 – The House of Wooden Santas ISBN 0-88995-166-7, ISBN 0-88995-249-3 (winner: Mr. Christie Award, Ann Conner-Brimer Award)
- 2000 – Eh? to Zed: A Canadian Abecedarium ISBN 0-88995-222-1 (nominated: Mr. Christie Award, Ann Conner-Brimer Award, Ruth Schwartz Award)
- 2001 – As Near to Heaven by Sea: A History of Newfoundland and Labrador – ISBN 0-14-027864-8 (nominated: Pearson Writers' Trust Non-Fiction Award)
- 2003 – Ann and Seamus ISBN 0-88899-561-X (nominated: Governor General's Award, Mr. Christie Award, Ruth Schwartz Award and five others; made into a folk opera of the same name)
- 2005 – Aunt Olga's Christmas Postcards ISBN 0-88899-593-8 (winner: Ann Conner-Brimer Award)
- 2007 – Gros Morne Time Lines ISBN 1-894521-14-5 (with Tara Bryan & Anne Meredith Barry)
- 2010 – "New Under the Sun" ISBN 978-1-897151-85-3 (book one of NewFoundLand trilogy; nominated: Atlantic Book Award)
- 2014 - "Printmaking on the Edge: 40 Years at St. Michael's" ISBN 978-0-9939030-1-4
- 2016 - "Found Far and Wide" ISBN 1-55081-632-2 (book two of NewFoundLand trilogy; winner: IPPY silver medal)
- 2018 - "One for the Rock" ISBN 1-55081-687-X (first Sebastian Synard crime fiction series)
- 2019 - "Land Beyond the Sea" ISBN 978-1-55081-752-2 (book three of NewFoundLand trilogy; nominated: Atlantic Book Award and INDIE book award)
- 2020 - "Two for the Tablelands" ISBN 978-1-55081-844-4 (second Sebastian Synard crime fiction series)
- 2021 - "Three for Trinity" ISBN 978-1-55081-914-4 (third Sebastian Synard crime fiction series)
- 2022 - "Four for Fogo Island" ISBN 978-1-55081-952-6 (fourth Sebastian Synard crime fiction series)
- 2023 - "Five for Forteau" ISBN 978-1-55081-992-2 (fifth Sebastian Synard crime fiction series)
- 2025 - "Six for Saint-Pierre" ISBN 978-1-77853-065-4 (sixth Sebastian Synard crime fiction series)

== Selected literary awards ==
- 1978 - Hold Fast - Governor General's Children's Literature Award
- 1979 - Hold Fast - Canadian Library Association's Book of the Year Award
- 1979 - Hold Fast - Ruth Schwartz Award
- 1980 - Hold Fast - IBBY Honour List
- 1980 - Far from Shore - Young Adult Caucus, Canadian Young Adult Book Award
- 1990 - Blood Red Ochre - Geoffery Bilson Award Finalist
- 1992 - Eating Between the Lines - Ann Connor Brimer Award
- 1992 - Eating Between the Lines - Canadian Library Association Book of the Year for Children Award
- 1997 - The House of the Wooden Santas - Mr. Christie's Book Award
- 1998 - The House of the Wooden Santas - Ann Connor Brimer Award
- 2001 - As Near to Heaven by Sea - Hilary Weston Writers' Trust Prize for Nonfiction Finalist
- 2004 - Ann and Seamus - Geoffery Bilson Award Finalist
- 2006 - Aunt Olga's Christmas Postcards - Ann Connor Brimer Award
- 2017 - Found Far and Wide - Independent Publisher Book Awards Silver Medalist - Canada East - Best regional fiction
- 2019 - One for the Rock - Independent Publisher Book Awards Silver Medalist - Canada East - Best regional fiction
- 2020 - Land Beyond the Sea - Next Generation Indie Book Award Finalist, Historical Fiction; Best Atlantic-Published Book Award Finalist; Canada Book Award Winner
- 2021 - Two for the Tablelands - Shortlisted - Howard Engel Award for Best Crime Novel Set in Canada
- 2022 - Three for Trinity - Shortlisted - Howard Engel Award for Best Crime Novel Set in Canada
