= Bill Freeman (author) =

Canadian writer

- Born: October 21, 1938 (age 87)
- Education: Acadia University; McMaster University
- Occupation: Writer

William Bradford Freeman (born October 21, 1938) is a Canadian writer of historical fiction for young adults, film scripts, documentaries, theatrical plays, educational videos and non-fiction books. He specializes in writing about Canada and the Canadian experience.

== Biography ==
After high school, Freeman worked in western Canada for a year and then traveled extensively in Europe. He returned to Canada to attend Acadia University in Nova Scotia. After graduating he worked as a Probation Officer and then did graduate work in sociology at McMaster University in Hamilton, Ontario.

Freeman began to write the Bains Series of books for young adults while living in Hamilton. There are now nine books in the Bains Series. Each focuses on a different industrial setting in Canada during the 1870s. The first book in the series, Shantymen of Cache Lake, received the Canada Council Children's Literature Prize for 1975 and several of the other books have received awards.

Freeman's books for adults follow political and social themes. Local 1005 is a political study of a Steelworkers' local in Hamilton. Their Town, co-authored with Marsha Hewitt, is an analysis of Hamilton city politics and Hamilton: a People's History, traces the development of the political and social life of the city. Freeman also authored a social and pictorial history of Toronto Island, where he now lives, called A Magical Place and another pictorial history, Casa Loma, Toronto's Fairy-Tale Castle and its Owner, Sir Henry Pellatt.

While working in the film industry Freeman and Richard Nielsen wrote Far From Home, Canadians in the First World War. This book emerged from a three-hour documentary film of the same name, produced by Nielsen. That experience led to other film projects. Freeman was the researcher and writer of a series of science educational videos for the high school market called the Elements of Biology, Physics, Chemistry and Earth Sciences.

Freeman's partner on these educational videos was the well-known Canadian children's film producer Wendy Loten. The two went on to work together on Loten's Mighty Machines 2 and 3. These films have been broadcast on TVO and Tree House Television.

Freeman also wrote two plays. Ghosts of the Madawaska is a children's play commissioned and performed by the Great Canadian Theatre Company in Ottawa, and Glory Days, a play about the 1946 Stelco strike in Hamilton, has been performed by Theatre Aquarius in 1989 and remounted in 2006.

In recent years Bill Freeman has been writing about urban and political issues. The New Urban Agenda published in 2015 and Democracy Rising in 2017 were both published by Dundurn Press.

Freeman has completed a series of 8 books called Mariner's Story. They will be published on Amazon beginning in 2021.

== Awards and prizes ==
In 1975, Freeman won the Canada Council Award for Juvenile Literature for his book Shantymen of Cache Lake (retrospectively considered one of the 1975 Governor General's Awards).

A Magical Place: Toronto Island and Its People, Certificate of Commendation, Heritage Toronto, October 2000

Casa Loma: Toronto's Fairy-tale Castle and its Owner, Sir Henry Pellatt, Award of Merit, Heritage Toronto, October 1999

Prairie Fire selected for the Canadian Children's Book Centre "Our Choice" list and nominated for the Geoffrey Bilson Award for Historical Fiction for Young People, 1998

Several books in the Bains Series were selected for "Our Choice" list. Vicky Metcalf Award for Children's Literature, 1984 (for a body of work, Bains Series)

== Works ==
=== Adult non-fiction ===
- Democracy Rising; Dundurn Press, 2017
- The New Urban Agenda; Dundurn Press, 2015
- Glory Days, Playwrights Canada Press, 2007
- Hamilton: A People’s History, James Lorimer and Co., Publishers, 2001
- Far From Home: Canadians in the First World War, with Richard Nielsen, McGraw-Hill Ryerson, 1999
- A Magical Place: Toronto Island and its People, James Lorimer & Company Ltd., Publishers, 1999
- Casa Loma: Toronto’s Fairy-tale Castle and its Owner, Sir Henry Pellatt, James Lorimer & Company Ltd., Publishers, 1998
- 1005 Political Life of a Union Local, James Lorimer & Company Ltd. Publishers, 1982
- Their Town: The Mafia, The Media and the Party Machine, (with Marsha Hewitt); James Lorimer & Company Ltd. Publishers, 1979
- The New Urban Agenda; Dundurn Press, 2015

=== Bains Series of young adult fiction ===
- Ambush in the Foothills, James Lorimer & Company Ltd. Publishers, 2000
- Sioux Winter, James Lorimer & Company Ltd. Publishers, 1999
- Prairie Fire!, James Lorimer & Company Ltd. Publishers, 1998
- Danger on the Tracks, James Lorimer & Company Ltd. Publishers, 1987
- Harbour Thieves, James Lorimer & Company Ltd. Publishers, 1984
- Trouble at Lachine Mill, James Lorimer & Company Ltd. Publishers, 1983
- The Last Voyage of the Scotian, James Lorimer & Company Ltd. Publishers, 1976
- First Spring on the Grand Banks, James Lorimer & Company Ltd. Publishers, 1978
- Shantymen of Cache Lake, James Lorimer & Company Ltd. Publishers, 1975

=== Other young adult books ===
- Cedric and the North End Kids, James Lorimer & Company Ltd. Publishers, 1978

==== Theatrical plays ====
- "Glory Days", a play with music, produced by Theatre Aquarius, Hamilton 1989
- "Glory Days", re-mounted by Theatre Aquarius in September/October Hamilton 2006

==== Plays for young adults ====
"Ghosts of the Madawaska", Great Canadian Theatre Company, Ottawa, 1985

==== Children's television series ====
- Script Writer, "Mighty Machines 2", a fourteen-part half-hour program for pre-school children produced for TVO, TFO and Treehouse by Loten Media.
- Script Writer, "Mighty Machines 3", a fourteen-part half-hour program for pre-school children produced for TVO, TFO and Treehouse by Loten Media.

==== Educational and documentary videos ====
- Script Writer, "Canada for Children", A three-part series of videos for elementary school children. Producer: Redcanoe Productions.
- Script Writer/Educational Consultant: "Elements of Earth Sciences", six educational videos for high school students. Producer: Algonquin Educational Productions.
- Script Writer/Educational Consultant: "Elements of Chemistry", six educational videos for high school students. Producer: Algonquin Educational Productions.
- Script Writer/Educational Consultant: "Elements of Physics", six educational videos for high school students. Producer: Algonquin Educational Productions.
- Script Writer/Educational Consultant and Narrator: "Elements of Biology" A series of six educational films for the high school students. Producer: Loten Media.

==== TV and video programs ====
- Historical consultant/Scriptwriter "Hamilton: Where the Rubber Meets the Road", Producer: Red Canoe Productions
- Script Writer/Narrator, "Kiev Pecherska Lavra", Producer, 3rd Street Videos, 1995
- Narrator/Researcher "Remembering Toronto", Producer: PBS Buffalo
