= Caroline Pignat =

Irish writer

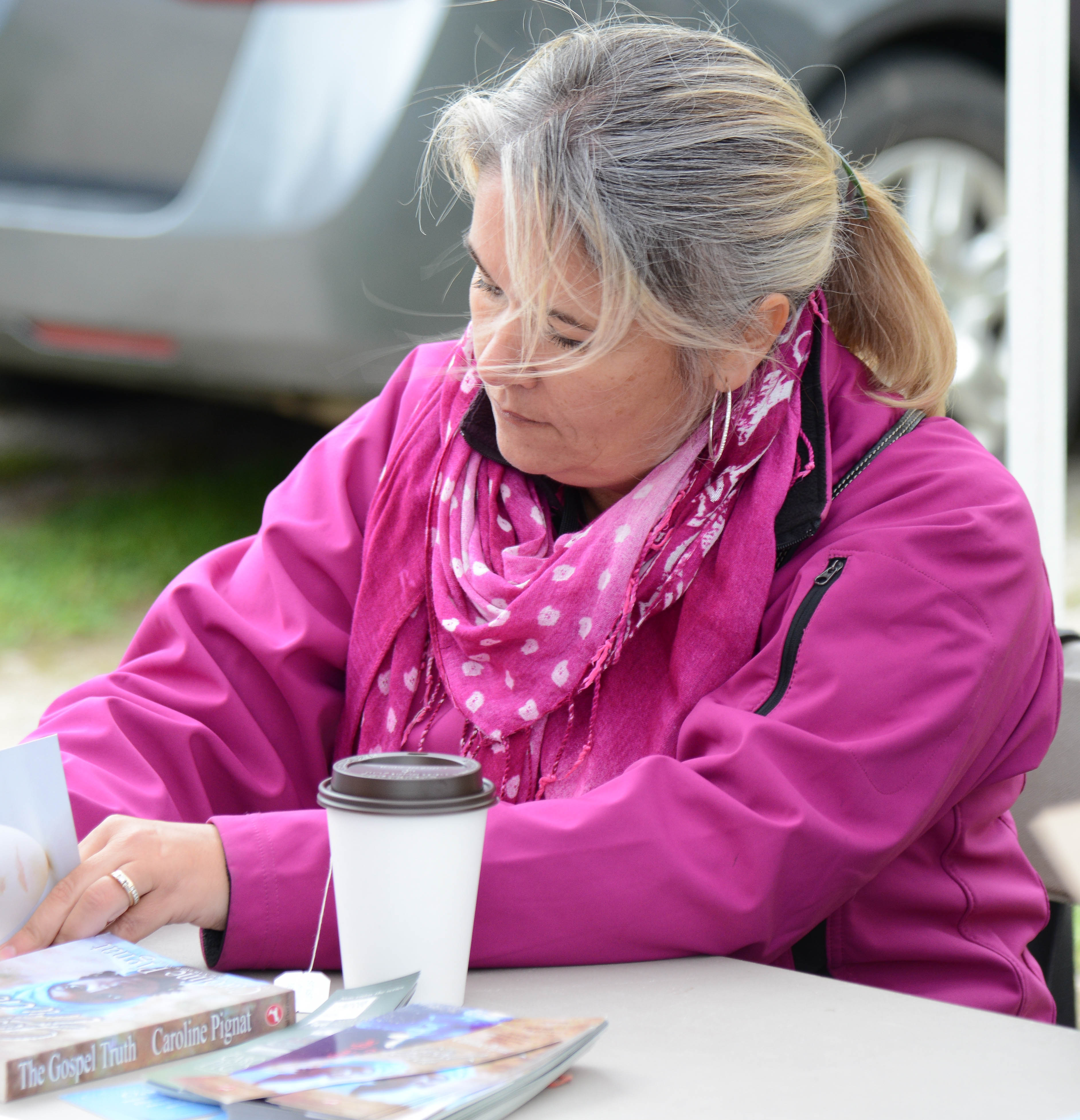
- Pignat at the Eden Mills Writers' Festival in 2015
- Born: Dublin, Ireland
- Occupation: Novelist
- Website: carolinepignat.com

Caroline Pignat is an Irish Canadian author and English teacher.

== Biography ==
Caroline Pignat is a graduate of University of Ottawa. Her work has been published in magazines, including Highlights for Children, Clubhouse and Clubhouse Jr., Storyteller, Guideposts, Guideposts for Kids, Living Faith for Kids, Capital Parent, The Word Among Us, and Focus on the Family. She wrote the family activities booklets, A Circle of Love (November 2006) and In the Presence of the Lord (November 2007).

Pignat's first young adult novel Egghead was published in 2008. Egghead is Will Reid, the target of Shane, the Grade 9 bully. In 2009 Pignat won her first Governor General's Award for her second young adult novel, Greener Grass: The Famine Years. Greener Grass is set in the land of Pignat's birth. Novels three and four, Wild Geese and Timber Wolf, are both sequels to Greener Grass. Characters are following during their adventures in North America. In novel five, Unspeakable, the main character is a survivor of the sinking of the Empress of Ireland. Pignat's second Governor General's Award came in 2015 for her sixth novel The Gospel Truth. Originally novel six was to be focused on a character from Greener Grass, but became the story of a number of characters on a Southern tobacco plantation. In novel seven, Pignat has five grade 12 students caught by surprise during a school lockdown. Pignat's latest book, Poetree, is a picture book of acrostic poetry about trees. It is a collaboration with award-winning illustrator François Thisdale.

== Selected works ==
- Egghead, Red Deer Press, (2008)
- Greener Grass: The Famine Years, Red Deer Press, (2008)
- Wild Geese, Red Deer Press, (2010)
- Timber Wolf, Red Deer Press, (2011)
- Unspeakable, Penguin Canada, (2014)
- The Gospel Truth, Red Deer Press, (2014)
- Shooter, Penguin Canada, (May 3, 2016)
- Poetree, Illustrated by Francois Thisdale, Red Deer Press, (June 2, 2018)
- The Discovery of Finnegan Wilde, Illustrated by Alan Granny, Thistledown press,
